= Pusha T discography =

Hip hop recording artist discography

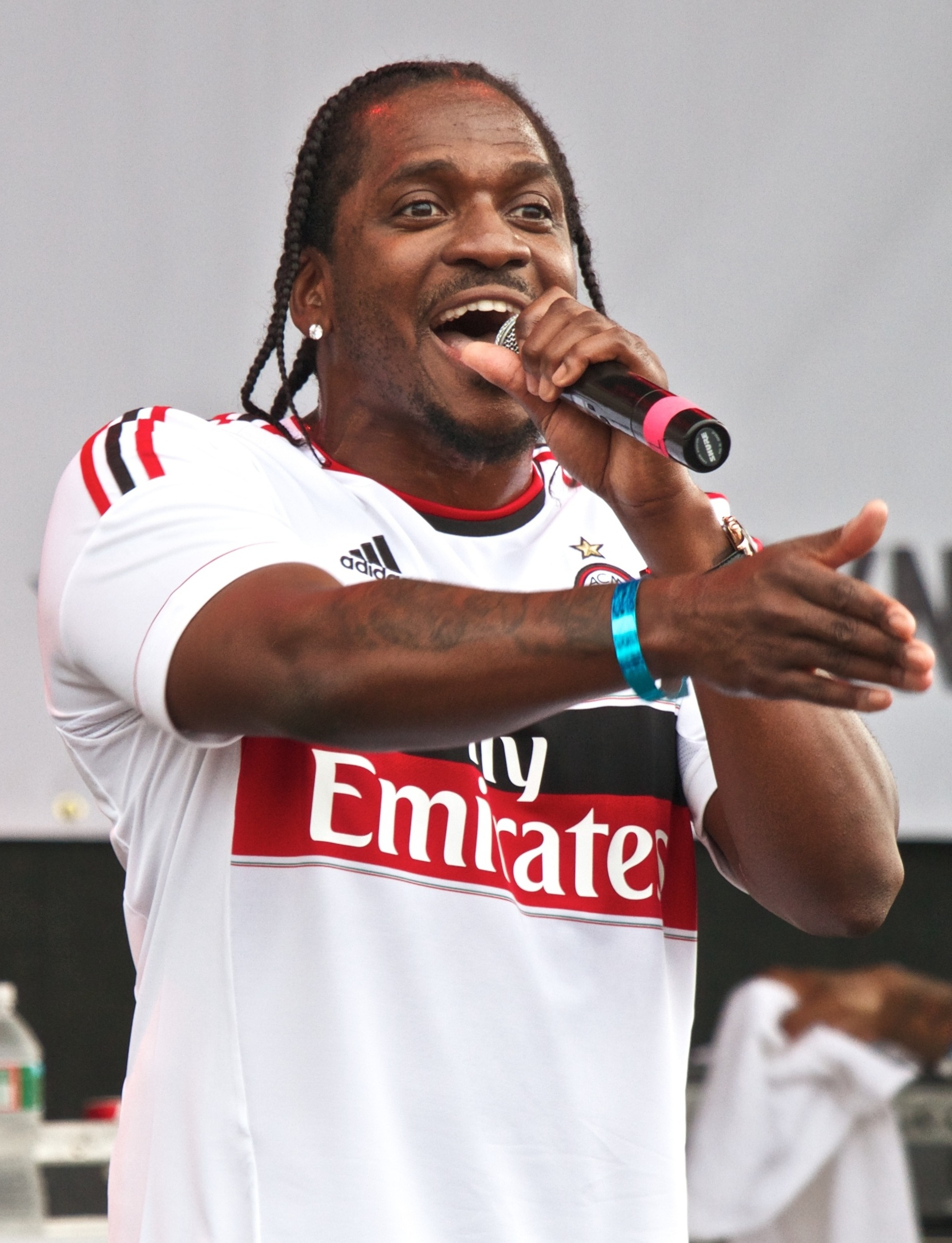
- Pusha T performing in 2013
- Studio albums: 4
- Extended plays: 1
- Singles: 53
- Music videos: 33
- Mixtapes: 2
- Promotional singles: 2

The discography of American rapper Pusha T consists of four studio albums, one extended play (EP), two mixtapes, 53 singles (including 31 as a featured artist), two promotional singles and 33 music videos.

Pusha T began his music career, alongside his brother No Malice (formerly Malice), forming a hip hop duo Clipse. While together as a duo, they released three studio albums, before they released another album with hip hop group Re-Up Gang and launched their record label Re-Up Records. In total, they released four studio albums and several mixtapes before taking their hiatus in 2010. During that time, Pusha T got started on his solo career, signing a deal to Kanye West's GOOD Music imprint and releasing his first mixtape, Fear of God (2011). The mixtape was later re-packaged and re-released for purchase, as an EP, titled Fear of God II: Let Us Pray (2011). The lead single from both projects was his commercial debut single, "My God". The EP spawned and supported by two more singles; "Trouble on My Mind" featuring Tyler, the Creator and "Amen" featuring Kanye West and Young Jeezy.

Upon his signing to GOOD Music, he began to work heavily with his label-mates as well as Kanye West. He appeared on several tracks from West's weekly song giveaway, called GOOD Fridays. In late 2012, Pusha T ultimately appeared on GOOD Music's compilation album Cruel Summer, five times; including the singles "Mercy" with Kanye West, Big Sean and 2 Chainz, and "New God Flow" (with West). While working on the compilation, he was also working on his debut studio album, My Name Is My Name. The album was on October 8, 2013, under GOOD Music and Def Jam.

In December 2015, Pusha T released the album King Push – Darkest Before Dawn. The album was set to serve as a prelude to Pusha T's third album, King Push. However, the album suffered from numerous delays, and renamed Daytona, which was released in May 2018.

In April 2022, Pusha T's fourth studio album It's Almost Dry was released as the follow-up to Daytona. It became his first number one album on the Billboard 200.

== Studio albums ==
List of studio albums with selected chart positions
Title	Album details	Peak chart positions										Sales
Title	Album details	US	US R&B/HH	AUS	BEL (FL)	BEL (WA)	CAN	DEN	FRA	UK	UK R&B	Sales
My Name Is My Name	Released: October 8, 2013; Label: GOOD, Def Jam; Formats: CD, digital download	4	2	—	120	159	7	36	197	56	6	US: 106,000
King Push – Darkest Before Dawn: The Prelude	Released: December 18, 2015; Label: GOOD, Def Jam; Formats: CD, LP, digital download	20	3	—	—	—	—	—	—	—	16	
Daytona	Released: May 25, 2018; Label: GOOD, Def Jam; Formats: CD, LP, cassette, digital download,	3	2	11	22	155	5	18	116	13	3	
It's Almost Dry	Released: April 22, 2022; Label: GOOD, Def Jam; Formats: CD, LP, Streaming, digital download	1	1	11	23	94	1	16	86	7	4	US: 55,000
"—" denotes a recording that did not chart or was not released in that territory.

== EPs ==
List of extended plays with selected chart positions
Title	EP details	Peak chart positions		
Title	EP details	US	US R&B	US Rap
Fear of God II: Let Us Pray	Released: November 8, 2011; Label: GOOD, Decon, Re-Up; Format: CD, digital download	66	10	8

== Mixtapes ==
List of mixtapes
Title	Album details
Fear of God	Released: March 21, 2011; Label: GOOD, Re-Up; Format: Digital download
Wrath of Caine	Released: January 28, 2013; Label: GOOD, Re-Up; Format: Digital download

== Singles ==
=== As lead artist ===
List of singles as lead artist, with selected chart positions and certifications, showing year released and album name
Title	Year	Peak chart positions										Certifications	Album
Title	Year	US	US R&B	US Rap	AUS	AUS Urb.	BEL (FL)	CAN	FRA	UK	UK R&B	Certifications	Album
"My God"	2011	—	—	—	—	—	—	—	—	—	—		Fear of God and Fear of God II: Let Us Pray
"Trouble on My Mind" (featuring Tyler, the Creator)	2011	—	—	—	—	—	—	—	—	—	—		Fear of God II: Let Us Pray
"Amen" (featuring Kanye West and Young Jeezy)	2011	—	—	—	—	—	—	—	—	—	—		Fear of God II: Let Us Pray
"Mercy" (with Kanye West, Big Sean, and 2 Chainz)	2012	13	1	1	60	25	— (Note: "Mercy" did not enter the Flanders Ultratop chart, but peaked at number 85 on the Ultratip chart.)	46	101	55	9	RIAA: 7× Platinum; BPI: Gold	Cruel Summer
"Exodus 23:1"	2012	—	—	—	—	—	—	—	—	—	—		Non-album single
"New God Flow" (with Kanye West)	2012	89	43	—	—	—	—	66	—	—	—		Cruel Summer
"Pain" (featuring Future)	2012	—	—	—	—	—	—	—	—	—	—		My Name Is My Name
"Millions" (featuring Rick Ross)	2013	— (Note: "Millions" did not enter the Billboard Hot 100, but peaked at number 24 on the Bubbling Under Hot 100 Singles chart, which acts as an extension to the Hot 100.)	47	—	—	—	—	—	—	—	—		Wrath of Caine
"Numbers on the Boards"	2013	—	—	—	—	28	—	—	—	—	—		My Name Is My Name
"Sweet Serenade" (featuring Chris Brown)	2013	— (Note: "Sweet Serenade" did not enter the Billboard Hot 100, but peaked at number 24 on the Bubbling Under Hot 100 Singles chart, which acts as an extension to the Hot 100.)	44	—	—	—	—	—	—	—	—		My Name Is My Name
"Let Me Love You" (featuring Kelly Rowland)	2013	—	—	—	—	—	—	—	—	—	—		My Name Is My Name
"Nosetalgia" (featuring Kendrick Lamar)	2014	—	—	—	—	—	—	—	—	—	—		My Name Is My Name
"Lunch Money"	2014	—	—	—	—	—	—	—	—	—	—		Non-album single
"Untouchable"	2015	—	—	—	—	—	—	—	—	—	—		King Push – Darkest Before Dawn: The Prelude
"M.F.T.R." (featuring The-Dream)	2015	—	—	—	—	—	—	—	—	—	—		King Push – Darkest Before Dawn: The Prelude
"Crutches, Crosses, Caskets"	2015	—	—	—	—	—	—	—	—	—	—		King Push – Darkest Before Dawn: The Prelude
"Drug Dealers Anonymous" (featuring Jay-Z)	2016	—	—	—	—	—	—	—	—	—	—		Non-album singles
"H.G.T.V. Freestyle"	2016	—	—	—	—	—	—	—	—	—	—		Non-album singles
"Circles" (featuring Ty Dolla Sign and Desiigner)	2016	—	—	—	—	—	—	—	—	—	—		Non-album singles
"Sociopath" (featuring Kash Doll)	2019	—	—	—	—	—	—	—	—	—	—		Non-album singles
"Coming Home" (featuring Lauryn Hill)	2019	—	—	—	—	—	—	—	—	—	—		Non-album singles
"Puppets (Succession Remix)" (with Nicholas Britell)	2019	—	—	—	—	—	—	—	—	—	—		Non-album singles
"Diet Coke"	2022	— (Note: "Diet Coke" did not enter the Billboard Hot 100, but peaked at number four on the Bubbling Under Hot 100 chart.)	43	—	—	—	—	93	—	—	—		It's Almost Dry
"Hear Me Clearly" (with Nigo)	2022	—	—	—	—	—	—	—	—	—	—		I Know Nigo and It's Almost Dry
"Neck & Wrist" (featuring Jay-Z and Pharrell Williams)	2022	76	23	18	—	—	—	69	—	—	—		It's Almost Dry
"Scrape It Off" (featuring Lil Uzi Vert and Don Toliver)	2022	59	17	14	—	—	—	41	—	—	—		It's Almost Dry
"—" denotes a recording that did not chart or was not released in that territory.

=== As featured artist ===
List of singles as featured artist, with selected chart positions and certifications, showing year released and album name
Title	Year	Peak chart positions										Certifications	Album
Title	Year	US	US R&B	US Rap	AUS	BEL (FL)	CAN	GER	SWE	SWI	UK	Certifications	Album
"Good Stuff" (Kelis featuring Terrar)	1999	—	—	—	—	41	—	72	44	74	19		Kaleidoscope
"Run Away (I Wanna Be with U)" (Nivea featuring Pusha T)	2001	—	—	—	47	—	—	—	—	—	48		Nivea
"Lose Your Life" (The Alchemist featuring Jadakiss, Snoop Dogg, and Pusha T)	2008	—	—	—	—	—	—	—	—	—	—		Chemical Warfare
"Runaway" (Kanye West featuring Pusha T)	2010	12	30	9	46	— (Note: "Runaway" did not enter the Flanders Ultratop chart, but peaked at number 61 on the Ultratip chart.)	13	—	28	56	23	RIAA: 5× Platinum; ARIA: Gold; BPI: 2× Platinum	My Beautiful Dark Twisted Fantasy
"Lovely" (John West featuring Pusha T)	2011	—	—	—	—	—	—	—	—	—	—		John West
"Awesome" (XV featuring Pusha T)	2011	—	—	—	—	—	—	—	—	—	—		Zero Heroes and Awesome EP!
"What Do You Take Me For?" (Pixie Lott featuring Pusha T)	2011	—	—	—	—	—	—	—	—	—	10		Young Foolish Happy
"Scared Money" (N.O.R.E. featuring Pusha T and Meek Mill)	2011	—	—	—	—	—	—	—	—	—	—		Scared Money
"Untouchable" (DJ Absolut featuring Ace Hood, Pusha T, and French Montana)	2012	—	—	—	—	—	—	—	—	—	—		Non-album single
"Your Favorite Rapper" (Alley Boy featuring Pusha T)	2012	—	—	—	—	—	—	—	—	—	—		Non-album single
"The Fight of My Life" (Colin Munroe featuring Pusha T)	2012	—	—	—	—	—	—	—	—	—	—		Unsung Hero
"Strangers" (Kay featuring Pusha T)	2012	—	—	—	—	—	47	—	—	—	—		My Name Is Kay
"Dope Bitch" (The-Dream featuring Pusha T)	2012	— (Note: "Dope Bitch" did not enter the Billboard Hot 100, but peaked at number 25 on the Bubbling Under Hot 100 Singles chart, which acts as an extension to the Hot 100.)	33	—	—	—	—	—	—	—	—		Climax
"Pride N Joy (Remix)" (Fat Joe featuring Trey Songz, Pusha T, Ashanti, and Miguel)	2012	—	—	—	—	—	—	—	—	—	—		Non-album single
"Tadow" (P.A.P.I. featuring French Montana, 2 Chainz, and Pusha T)	2013	—	—	—	—	—	—	—	—	—	—		Student of the Game
"Machine Gun" (Chase & Status featuring Pusha T)	2013	—	—	—	—	—	—	—	—	—	—		Brand New Machine
"Tryna Get Me One" (Gillie da Kid featuring Pusha T)	2013	—	—	—	—	—	—	—	—	—	—		Non-album single
"Know You Better" (Omarion featuring Pusha T and Fabolous)	2013	—	— (Note: "Know You Better" did not enter the Hot R&B/Hip-Hop Songs chart, but peaked at number four on the Bubbling Under R&B/Hip-Hop Singles chart, which acts as an extension to the R&B/Hip-Hop Songs chart.)	—	—	—	—	—	—	—	—		Self Made Vol. 3
"Move That Dope" (Future featuring Pharrell, Pusha T, and Casino)	2014	46	11	7	—	—	—	—	—	—	—	RIAA: Platinum	Honest
"Burial" (Yogi featuring Pusha T)	2014	—	—	—	—	—	—	—	—	—	—		Burial
"Maybe" (Teyana Taylor featuring Yo Gotti and Pusha T)	2014	— (Note: "Maybe" did not enter the Billboard Hot 100, but peaked at number 10 on the Bubbling Under Hot 100 Singles chart, which acts as an extension to the Hot 100.)	32	—	—	—	—	—	—	—	—	RIAA: Gold	VII
"Meltdown" (Stromae featuring Lorde, Pusha T, Q-Tip, and HAIM)	2014	—	—	—	—	7	—	—	—	—	—		The Hunger Games: Mockingjay, Part 1 – Original Motion Picture Soundtrack
"Bugatti" (Tiga featuring Pusha T)	2014	—	—	—	—	—	—	—	—	—	—		Non-album singles
"Push It" (iSHi featuring Pusha T)	2015	—	—	—	—	—	—	—	—	—	—		Non-album singles
"Psycho (Remix)" (Rozzi Crane featuring Pusha T)	2015	—	—	—	—	—	—	—	—	—	—		Space
"Siri" (Yogi featuring Pusha T and Elliphant)	2015	—	—	—	—	—	—	—	—	—	—		Non-album single
"Wrist" (Logic featuring Pusha T)	2016	— (Note: "Wrist" did not enter the Billboard Hot 100, but peaked at number 20 on the Bubbling Under Hot 100 Singles chart, which acts as an extension to the Hot 100.)	44	—	—	—	—	—	—	—	—	RIAA: Gold	Bobby Tarantino
"Layers" (Royce da 5'9" featuring Rick Ross & Pusha T)	2016	—	—	—	—	—	—	—	—	—	—		Layers
"Drugs" (Villz featuring Pusha T)	2016	—	—	—	—	—	—	—	—	—	—		Non-album single
"G Train" (Thirdstory featuring Pusha T)	2016	—	—	—	—	—	—	—	—	—	—		Non-album single
"Too Young" (Zeds Dead featuring Rivers Cuomo and Pusha T)	2016	—	—	—	—	—	—	—	—	—	—		Northern Lights
"Let Me Out" (Gorillaz featuring Pusha T & Mavis Staples)	2017	—	—	—	—	—	—	—	—	—	—		Humanz
"Good Goodbye" (Linkin Park featuring Pusha T and Stormzy)	2017	—	— (Note: "Good Goodbye" did not enter the US Hot R&B/Hip Hop Songs chart, but peaked at number 15 on the US Hot Rock & Alternative Songs chart.)	—	—	—	—	65	—	49	— (Note: "Good Goodbye" did not enter the UK Singles Chart, but peaked at number 61 on the UK Singles Sales chart.)	BPI: Silver	One More Light
"Freedom" (Steve Angello featuring Pusha T)	2018	—	—	—	—	—	—	—	—	—	—		Human
"Good Morning" (Black Thought featuring Pusha T, Swizz Beatz, and Killer Mike)	2020	—	—	—	—	—	—	—	—	—	—		Streams of Thought, Vol. 3: Cain & Abel
"HAHA" (Al-Doms featuring Pusha T)	2022	—	—	—	—	—	—	—	—	—	—		Non-album single
"Never End Up Broke Pt. 2" (Symba featuring Pusha T)	2022	—	—	—	—	—	—	—	—	—	—		Results Take Time
"Lights Please" (Khi Infinite featuring Chase B and Pusha T)	2022	—	—	—	—	—	—	—	—	—	—		Non-album single
"Mr. Put That Shit On" (Cyhi the Prynce featuring Pusha T)	2023	—	—	—	—	—	—	—	—	—	—		The Story of Mr. EGOT
"All Eyes on Me" (Phoenix featuring Chad Hugo, Benee and Pusha T)	2023	—	—	—	—	—	—	—	—	—	—		Non-album singles
"Problems" (Triangle Park Mix) (Ray Vaughn featuring Pusha T)	2024	—	—	—	—	—	—	—	—	—	—		Non-album singles
"—" denotes a recording that did not chart or was not released in that territory.

=== Promotional singles ===
List of promotional singles, showing year released and album name
Title	Year	Album
"Who I Am" (featuring 2 Chainz and Big Sean)	2013	My Name Is My Name
"No Problem"	2018	Venom
"Misfit Toys" (Pusha T and Mako)	2021	Arcane
"White Lies" (Cocaine Bear Remix)	2023	Cocaine Bear

== Other charted and certified songs ==
List of songs, with selected chart positions, showing year released and album name
Title	Year	Peak chart positions							Certifications	Album
Title	Year	US	US R&B	AUS	CAN	IRE	UK	WW	Certifications	Album
"So Appalled" (Kanye West featuring Jay-Z, Pusha T, Cyhi the Prynce, Swizz Beatz, and RZA)	2010	—	— (Note: "So Appalled" did not enter the Hot R&B/Hip-Hop Songs chart, but peaked at number 14 on the Bubbling Under R&B/Hip-Hop Singles chart, which acts as an extension to the R&B/Hip-Hop Songs chart.)	—	—	—	—	—	RIAA: Gold	My Beautiful Dark Twisted Fantasy
"The Morning" (with Raekwon, Common, 2 Chainz, Kid Cudi, Cyhi the Prynce, and D'banj)	2012	— (Note: "The Morning" did not enter the Billboard Hot 100, but peaked at number 19 on the Bubbling Under Hot 100 Singles chart, which acts as an extension to the Hot 100.)	49	—	—	—	—	—		Cruel Summer
"Don't Like.1" (with Kanye West, Chief Keef, Big Sean, and Jadakiss)	2012	—	—	—	—	—	—	—	RIAA: Platinum	Cruel Summer
"If You Know You Know"	2018	73	35	—	92	—	93	—	RIAA: Gold	Daytona
"The Games We Play"	2018	100	50	—	—	—	—	—	RIAA: Gold	Daytona
"Hard Piano" (featuring Rick Ross)	2018	— (Note: "Hard Piano" did not enter the Billboard Hot 100, but peaked at number two on the Bubbling Under Hot 100 Singles chart, which acts as an extension to the Hot 100.)	— (Note: "Hard Piano" did not enter the Hot R&B/Hip-Hop Songs chart, but peaked at number one on the Bubbling Under R&B/Hip-Hop Singles chart, which acts as an extension to the R&B/Hip-Hop Songs chart.)	—	—	—	—	—		Daytona
"Come Back Baby"	2018	— (Note: "Come Back Baby" did not enter the Billboard Hot 100, but peaked at number five on the Bubbling Under Hot 100 Singles chart, which acts as an extension to the Hot 100.)	— (Note: "Come Back Baby" did not enter the Hot R&B/Hip-Hop Songs chart, but peaked at number three on the Bubbling Under R&B/Hip-Hop Singles chart, which acts as an extension to the R&B/Hip-Hop Songs chart.)	—	—	—	—	—		Daytona
"Santeria"	2018	— (Note: "Santeria" did not enter the Billboard Hot 100, but peaked at number 10 on the Bubbling Under Hot 100 Singles chart, which acts as an extension to the Hot 100.)	— (Note: "Santeria" did not enter the Hot R&B/Hip-Hop Songs chart, but peaked at number five on the Bubbling Under R&B/Hip-Hop Singles chart, which acts as an extension to the R&B/Hip-Hop Songs chart.)	—	—	—	—	—		Daytona
"What Would Meek Do?" (featuring Kanye West)	2018	75	37	—	84	—	100	—		Daytona
"Infrared"	2018	65	32	—	96	—	—	—		Daytona
"Tell the Vision" (Pop Smoke featuring Kanye West and Pusha T)	2021	49	16	47	19	—	55	33		Faith
"Top Shottas" (Pop Smoke and The Neptunes featuring Pusha T, Beam, and TRAVI)	2021	— (Note: "Top Shotta" did not enter the Billboard Hot 100, but peaked at number 10 on the Bubbling Under Hot 100 chart.)	—	—	67	—	—	180		Faith
"Brambleton"	2022	100	37	—	91	—	—	—		It's Almost Dry
"Let the Smokers Shine the Coupes"	2022	— (Note: "Let the Smokers Shine the Coupes" did not enter the Billboard Hot 100, but peaked at number two on the Bubbling Under Hot 100 Singles chart, which acts as an extension to the Hot 100.)	39	—	90	—	—	—		It's Almost Dry
"Dreamin of the Past" (featuring Kanye West)	2022	81	28	—	54	77	80	128		It's Almost Dry
"Just So You Remember"	2022	— (Note: "Just So You Remember" did not enter the Billboard Hot 100, but peaked at number nine on the Bubbling Under Hot 100 Singles chart, which acts as an extension to the Hot 100.)	46	—	—	—	—	—		It's Almost Dry
"Rock n Roll" (featuring Kanye West and Kid Cudi)	2022	78	25	—	67	—	98	130		It's Almost Dry
"Call My Bluff"	2022	— (Note: "Call My Bluff" did not enter the Billboard Hot 100, but peaked at number 13 on the Bubbling Under Hot 100 Singles chart, which acts as an extension to the Hot 100.)	49	—	—	—	—	—		It's Almost Dry
"—" denotes a recording that did not chart or was not released in that territory.

== Guest appearances ==
List of non-single guest appearances, with other performing artists, showing year released and album name
Title	Year	Other artist(s)	Album
"D-Game"	2000	504 Boyz, Pharrell	Goodfellas
"Everyday" (Neptunes Remix)	2000	Angie Stone	—N/a
"Black Coffee (Remix)"	2000	All Saints	—N/a
"Truth or Dare"	2001	N.E.R.D, Kelis	In Search Of...
"Cross the Border" (J.B.M. Remix)	2001	Philly's Most Wanted, Fabolous	Get Down or Lay Down
"D-Game (Remix)"	2001	Silkk the Shocker, Master P, Pharrell	My World, My Way
"Popular Thug"	2001	Kelis	Wanderland
"In the Late Night Hour"	2001	Ice Cube, Pharrell	Greatest Hits
"Hot"	2003	Rosco P. Coldchain, Boo-Bonic	The Neptunes Present... Clones
"Milkshake (Remix)"	2003	Kelis, Pharrell	—N/a
"Goin' Out"	2005	Faith Evans, Pharrell	The First Lady
"Click Clack"	2005	Slim Thug	Already Platinum
"Stay with Me"	2006	Pharrell Williams	In My Mind
"Chevy Ridin'" (Remix)	2006	Dre, Dirtbag, Fat Joe, The Game, Rick Ross	—N/a
"Heaven" (Remix)	2007	John Legend	Heaven EP
"Joke's on You"	2007	Fabolous	From Nothin' to Somethin'
"B.L.O.W. (Block Life Is Our Way)"	2007	Rick Ross	Rise to Power
"The Feature Heavy Song"	2008	Wale, Bun B, Tre	The Mixtape About Nothing
"Drivin' Down the Block" (Remix)	2008	Kidz in the Hall, Bun B, The Cool Kids	The In Crowd
"Everyone Nose (All the Girls Standing in the Line for the Bathroom)" (Remix)	2008	N.E.R.D, CRS	Seeing Sounds
"Game's Pain" (Remix)	2008	Game, Jadakiss, Young Buck, Fat Joe, Keyshia Cole, Bun B, Queen Latifah	—N/a
"Tokyo Drift (Fast & Furious)" (Remix)	2009	Teriyaki Boyz, Fam-Lay	Serious Japanese
"Maybach Music 2.5"	2009	Rick Ross, T-Pain, DJ Khaled, Birdman, Fabolous	Deeper Than Rap
"Something That I Like"	2009	Ryan Leslie	Transition
"U Know What U Doin" (Remix)	2009	Kevin Cossom	Hook vs. Bridge
"Outta Time"	2009	Kera Bailey	Pink Diamonds
"Good Friday"	2010	Kanye West, Kid Cudi, Charlie Wilson, Big Sean, Common	GOOD Fridays
"Christian Dior Denim Flow"	2010	Kanye West, John Legend, Ryan Leslie, Lloyd Banks, Kid Cudi	GOOD Fridays
"Take One for the Team"	2010	Kanye West, Keri Hilson, CyHi the Prynce	GOOD Fridays
"Looking for Trouble"	2010	Kanye West, CyHi the Prynce, Big Sean, J. Cole	GOOD Fridays
"Christmas in Harlem"	2010	Kanye West, Big Sean, CyHi the Prynce, Teyana Taylor, Musiq Soulchild, Cam'ron, Jim Jones, Vado	GOOD Fridays
"So Appalled"	2010	Kanye West, Jay-Z, CyHi the Prynce, Swizz Beatz, RZA	My Beautiful Dark Twisted Fantasy
"Home Sweet Home"	2010	Lloyd Banks	H.F.M. 2 (Hunger for More 2)
"Dessert 4 Thought"	2010	Joe Budden, Styles P	Mood Muzik 4: A Turn 4 The Worst
"Make a Killing"	2010	Tabi Bonney	Fresh
"Money in My Pocket"	2010	OJ da Juiceman	Gangsta and a Gentleman
"Stuttering" (Remix)	2010	Fefe Dobson	—N/a
"Bang Bang"	2010	Swizz Beatz, Pharrell	Monster Mondays Vol. 1
"Kitchen"	2011	2 Chainz, Young Jeezy	Codeine Cowboy (A 2 Chainz Collective)
"Thousand Poundz"	2011	CyHi the Prynce, Pill	Royal Flush II
"100 Keys"	2011	Big Sean, Rick Ross	Finally Famous
"Doves Fly"	2011	Fred the Godson	—N/a
"Everything That Glitters"	2011	DJ Drama, French Montana	Third Power
"Go 'N' Get It" (Remix)	2011	Ace Hood, Beanie Sigel, Busta Rhymes, Styles P	Blood, Sweat & Tears
"So Far to Go"	2011	Trae Tha Truth, Meek Mill	Undisputed
"Round & Round"	2011	Torch, Red Café, Masspike Miles	UFO
"Hot (In This Bitch)"	2011	Gilbere Forte, Jim Jones	Some Dreams Never Sleep
"Power"	2011	Mateo, Ab-Liva	Love & Stadiums
"Sure Thing" (Remix)	2011	Miguel	—N/a
"Lost in the World" (Remix)	2011	Kanye West	—N/a
"Till I'm Gone" (Remix)	2011	Tinie Tempah, Wiz Khalifa, Jim Jones	Happy Birthday
"Ain’t Nun But Some Dope"	2011	Rum	—N/a
"I'll Show You"	2012	T.I.	Fuck da City Up
"See About Us"	2012	Kid Named Breezy, Jigg	Snapback with a Life Full
"Push It Back"	2012	JD Era	No Handouts
"You Need This Music" (Remix)	2012	Nottz, Dwele	In My Mind
"Next Big Thing"	2012	Chester French, Pharrell	Music 4 Tngrs
"Tonight (Best You Ever Had)" (Remix)	2012	John Legend	—N/a
"The Morning"	2012	Raekwon, 2 Chainz, Common, CyHi, Kid Cudi	Cruel Summer
"Higher"	2012	The-Dream, Ma$e, Cocaine 80s	Cruel Summer
"Don't Like.1"	2012	Kanye West, Chief Keef, Big Sean, Jadakiss	Cruel Summer
"In My Sleep"	2012	Bleu Davinci, Bun B, Calico Jonez	The Davinci Code
"Runway"	2012	Iggy Azalea	Glory
"Momma In My Ear"	2012	Mikkey Halsted	Castro
"Ready to Go"	2012	Eastside Jody	Still Trappin
"Fettuccine"	2012	DJ Green Lantern, Future, Emilio Rojas	Invade the Game
"Gripping Over Here"	2012	Styles P, French Montana	The Diamond Life Project
"Selling Everything"	2012	Dew Baby	Dew Jack City
"Pierce" (Remix)	2012	Dominic Lord, Grimes	Fashion Show EP
"Your Favorite Rapper"	2012	Alley Boy	The Gift of Discernment
"Trapping in My Sleep"	2012	DJ Naim, Sheek Louch, Bun B	I Got Next
"Don King" (Remix)	2012	Ransom	—N/a
"Meyer Lansky"	2012	Shyne	Gangland
"Str8 Up Menace" (Re-Up Mix)	2012	CurT@!n$	—N/a
"Clouds"	2012	DJ Drama, Rick Ross, Miguel, Currensy	Quality Street Music
"Tick, Tock"	2012	Raekwon, Joell Ortiz, Danny Brown	Music from and Inspired by the Motion Picture The Man with the Iron Fists
"Life Is So Exciting"	2012	Fabolous	The S.O.U.L. Tape 2
"Infatuated"	2012	Pure	—N/a
"Name Me King"	2012	Game	Jesus Piece
"My Hoes They Do Drugs"	2012	King L, Juicy J	Drilluminati
"Concrete Jungle"	2012	Troy Ave	White Christmas
"This Feeling"	2013	Mayalino	Bird Day
"Mobster Dinner"	2013	Mayalino, Sam Hook	K.I.L.O.S.
"Street Religion"	2013	Mayalino	K.I.L.O.S.
"Bet That"	2013	Gunplay	Cops n Robbers
"She Bad Bad" (Remix)	2013	Eve, Juicy J	Lip Lock
"Red Cup"	2013	Brianna Perry	Symphony No. 9: The B Collection
"Bad Girl"	2013	Rebel Rose	—N/a
"Give Em Hell"	2013	Wink Loc, Ra Diggs	Locomotive 3
"100"	2013	Bangladesh, Jadakiss, 2 Chainz	Ponzi Scheme
"Buy"	2013	Bangladesh, Tom Foolery, 2 Chainz, Fast Life	Ponzi Scheme
"Take Care of Me Baby"	2013	Cassie	RockaByeBaby
"Boss Bitches & Fast Cars"	2013	Red Café, Fabolous	American Psycho 2
"Fast Slow"	2013	Ti'Jean	—N/a
"Dope"	2013	Los, Yo Gotti	Becoming King
"Pussy"	2013	The-Dream, Big Sean	IV Play
"Mad Fo"	2013	Ludacris, Meek Mill, Chris Brown, Swizz Beatz	#IDGAF
"Peso"	2013	Machine Gun Kelly, Meek Mill	Black Flag
"Street Life"	2013	Kelly Rowland	Talk a Good Game
"I Know Love"	2013	Sterling Simms	11 Missed Calls
"How Many Tears"	2013	DMP	God Made Durt
"Thank U Lord"	2013	Trouble	The Return of December 17th
"TKO" (Black Friday Remix)	2013	Justin Timberlake, J. Cole, A$AP Rocky	—N/a
"Shame The Devil"	2013	No Malice	Hear Ye Him
"Kopy"	2013	Vado, French Montana, Chinx Drugz	Slime Flu 4
"Vortex"	2013	King Chip, Kid Cudi	44108
"Live and Learn (I Will)"	2013	2 Chainz, Dolla Boy	B.O.A.T.S. II: Me Time
"I'll Be Gone" (DJ Vice Remix)	2013	Linkin Park	Recharged
"Pure"	2013	Doughboyz Cashout, Jeezy, Big K.R.I.T.	#ItsThaWorld2
"Murda"	2014	Kid Ink	My Own Lane
"FML"	2014	August Alsina	Testimony
"Hustle"	2014	Popcaan	Where We Come From
"Black Card"	2014	Joke	Ateyaba
"No Flex Zone" (Remix)	2014	Rae Sremmurd, Nicki Minaj	—N/a
"Chimes" (Remix)	2014	Hudson Mohawke, Future, Travis Scott, French Montana	—N/a
"Hold Me"	2014	Janine	Dark Mind EP
"The Deep End"	2014	Wale	Festivus
"D.G.I.F.U."	2015	Chris Brown, Tyga	Fan of a Fan: The Album
"Night Riders"	2015	Major Lazer, Travis Scott, 2 Chainz, Mad Cobra	Peace Is the Mission
"Break Yourself"	2015	Far East Movement, Hook n Sling	We Are Your Friends (a soundtrack)
"How Could You Forget"	2015	Trey Songz	Intermission I & II
"Everyday (Amor)"	2015	Sean Combs, Jadakiss, Styles P, Tish Hyman	MMM (Money Making Mitch)
"I Can't Complain"	2015	Dave East	Hate Me Now
"Holy Angel"	2015	Chris Brown	Before the Party
"Hunnid"	2016	Yo Gotti	The Art of Hustle
"Kung Fu"	2016	Baauer, Future	Aa
"Jet"	2016	Desiigner	New English
"Paid"	2016	Jeremih	The Land: Soundtrack
"Black Moses"	2016	Meek Mill, Priscilla Renea	The Birth of a Nation: The Inspired By Album
"Meyer Lansky"	2016	Shyne	Gangland
"Two Wrongs"	2016	Meek Mill, Guordan Banks	DC4
"Enough"	2017	Flume	Skin Companion EP II
"Kilo Champ"	2017	Mayalino	Mayalino
"Choices"	2017	Tracy T, Rick Ross	Millionaire Nightmares
"Gambles"	2017	Quentin Miller	Falco
"Good Man"	2017	DJ Khaled, Jadakiss	Grateful
"Alcantara"	2017	Belly	Mumble Rap 2
"OMG"	2017	Vic Mensa	The Manuscript
"No Dope on Sundays"	2017	Cyhi the Prynce	No Dope on Sundays
"Go Get the Money"	2018	Zaytoven, T.I., Rick Ross, Yo Gotti	Trapholizay
"Words of Wisdom"	2018	Don Q	Don Talk
"Mood Ring"	2018	Reese LaFlare	Reese LaFlare
"Miami"	2018	Valee	Good Job, You Found Me
"Summer on Lock"	2018	Royce da 5'9", Jadakiss, Fabolous, Agent Sasco	Book of Ryan
"Loose Lips"	2018	Berner, Conway the Machine, Fresh	The Big Pescado
"Cold Blooded"	2018	Swizz Beatz	Poison
"Feel the Love"	2018	Kids See Ghosts	Kids See Ghosts
"Brother's Keeper"	2018	Anderson .Paak	Oxnard
"Coke White / Moscow"	2019	Goldlink	Diaspora
"18 Wheeler"	2019	Benny the Butcher	The Plugs I Met
"Palmolive"	2019	Freddie Gibbs, Madlib, Killer Mike	Bandana
"Been Use Ta"	2019	DJ Shadow	Our Pathetic Age
"Nightmares Are Real"	2019	YBN Cordae	The Lost Boy
"Porno"	2019	IDK, JID	Is He Real?
"Huntin Season"	2020	Jadakiss	Ignatius
"No Explanation"	2020	Joey Badass	The Light Pack (EP)
"Tell the Vision"	2021	Pop Smoke, Kanye West	Faith
"Top Shotta"	2021	Pop Smoke, The Neptunes, TRAVI, Beam	Faith
"Jungle Mantra"	2021	Divine, Vince Staples	The White Tiger
"Plentiful"	2021	Alicia Keys	Keys
"No Man Falls"	2022	The Game, 2 Chainz	Drillmatic – Heart vs. Mind
"Dancing with the Devil"	2022	Babyface Ray, Landstrip Chip	FACE
"Day One"	2022	Calvin Harris, Pharrell Williams	Funk Wav Bounces Vol. 2
"Gold Rings"	2022	Freddie Gibbs	Soul Sold Separately
"Paper Right"	2024	Wyclef Jean, Lola Brooke, Capella Grey, Flau'jae Johnson	—N/a
"Everybody Like"	2024	Kid Cudi	Insano (Nitro Mega)
"Callin'"	2024	Alexis Ashley	—N/a
"Big Headed"	2025	YSN Capo	Gemini Cap Vol3
"Damage Control"	2025	Culture Jam, Wale	—N/a
"Danger Danger"	2025	Swizz Beatz, Jadakiss	Godfather of Harlem: Season 4
"Life 4 a Life"	2026	IDK	E.T.D.S.
"OMG"	2026	YG	The Gentlemen's Club
"Set of Keys"	2026	Fat Joe, Dre	Organized Rhyme

== Production discography ==
List of production and songwriting credits (excluding guest appearances, interpolations, and samples)
Track(s)	Year	Credit	Artist(s)	Album
3. "This Time"	2015	Additional vocals, songwriter	Axwell & Ingrosso	More Than You Know
2. "Selah"	2019	Songwriter	Kanye West	Jesus Is King
4. "Closed on Sunday"	2019	Songwriter	Kanye West	Jesus Is King
8. "Ok Ok"	2021	Songwriter	Kanye West	Donda
9. "Junya"	2021	Songwriter	Kanye West	Donda
19. "Tell the Vision"	2021	Songwriter	Kanye West	Donda
25. "Ok Ok pt 2"	2021	Songwriter	Kanye West	Donda
26. "Junya pt 2"	2021	Songwriter	Kanye West	Donda
4. "Life of the Party"; (with André 3000)	2021	Songwriter	Kanye West	Donda (Deluxe)
11. "Up from the Ashes"	2021	Songwriter	Kanye West	Donda (Deluxe)

== Music videos ==
=== As lead artist ===
List of music videos, showing year released and director
Title	Year	Director(s)
"Cook It Down"	2011	Shomi Patwary
"My God"	2011	Pusha Ton, Ryan Reichenfeld
"Can I Live"	2011	Mike Carson, Mike Waxx
"Open Your Eyes"	2011	Orson Whales
"Blow"	2011	Mike Carson, Mike Waxx
"Alone In Vegas"	2011	Orson Whales
"Trouble on My Mind" (featuring Tyler, the Creator)	2011	Jason Goldwatch
"Feeling Myself" (featuring Kevin Cossom)	2011	Taj Stansberry
"Tony Montana"	2011	Samuel Rogers
"What Dreams Are Made Of"	2012	Jason Goldwatch
"Exodus 23:1" (featuring The-Dream)	2012	Samuel Rogers
"Blocka" (featuring Popcaan and Travis Scott)	2012	Orson Whales
"Millions" (featuring Rick Ross)	2013	Samuel Rogers
"Doesn't Matter" (featuring French Montana)	2013	Samuel Rogers
"Trust You" (featuring Kevin Gates)	2013	Matt Alonzo
"Numbers on the Boards"	2013	So Me
"King Push"	2013	Nathaniel Brown
"Nosetalgia" (featuring Kendrick Lamar)	2013	DONDA
"Sweet Serenade" (featuring Chris Brown)	2013	Colin Tilley
"Pain" (featuring Future)	2013	Pusha T
"Hold On" (featuring Rick Ross)	2013	Dre Films
"Suicide" (featuring Ab-Liva)	2014	Nathaniel Brown
"Lunch Money"	2014	Emil Nava
"Untouchable"	2015	Harrison Boyce
"Crutches, Crosses, Caskets"	2015	Kid Art
"M.F.T.R." (featuring The-Dream)	2015	Kid Art
"M.P.A." (featuring Kanye West, A$AP Rocky and The-Dream)	2015	Shomi Patwary
"H.G.T.V."	2016	Yung Jake
"If You Know You Know"	2018	Shomi Patwary

=== As featured artist ===
List of music videos, showing year released and director
Title	Year	Director(s)
"Good Stuff" (Kelis featuring Pusha T)	2000	David LaChapelle
"Run Away (I Wanna Be with You)" (Nivea featuring Pusha T)	2002	Dylan Perry
"Everyone Nose (Remix)" (N.E.R.D featuring Kanye West, Lupe Fiasco and Pusha T)	2008	Hype Williams
"Maybach Music 2.5" (Rick Ross featuring T-Pain and Pusha T)	2010	Spiff TV
"Lovely" (John West featuring Pusha T)	2011	Mark Staubach
"Home Sweet Home" (Lloyd Banks featuring Pusha T)	2011	Mike Carson & Mike Waxx
"What Do You Take Me For?" (Pixie Lott featuring Pusha T)	2011	Declan Whitebloom
"Scared Money" (N.O.R.E. featuring Pusha T and Meek Mill)	2011	Will Millions
"Doves Fly" (Fred the Godson featuring Pusha T)	2011	Taya Simmons
"Mercy" (Kanye West featuring Big Sean, Pusha T and 2 Chainz)	2012	Nabil Elderkin
"100" (Bangladesh featuring Pusha T and Jadakiss)	2012	Gabriel Hart
"Dope Bitch" (The-Dream featuring Pusha T)	2012	—N/a
"See About Us" (Kid Named Breezy featuring Pusha T)	2012	Langston Sessoms
"Untouchable" (DJ Absolut featuring Ace Hood, Pusha T and French Montana)	2012	Shatek
"Your Favorite Rapper" (Alley Boy featuring Pusha T)	2012	Patrick Fagan
"The Fight of My Life" (Colin Munroe featuring Pusha T)	2012	Philip Sportel
"Life Is So Exciting" (Fabolous featuring Pusha T)	2012	Jon J
"Tadow" (P.A.P.I. featuring French Montana, 2 Chainz and Pusha T)	2013	Will Millions
"FML" (August Alsina featuring Pusha T)	2014	—N/a
"Psycho (Remix)" (Rozzi Crane featuring Pusha T)	2015	Aya Tanimura
"Push It" (iSHi featuring Pusha T)	2015	Alex Wessely
"Burial" (Yogi & Skrillex featuring Pusha T, Moody Good and Trollphace)	2015	Grant Singer
"Hunnid" (Yo Gotti featuring Pusha T)	2016	—N/a
"Layers" (Royce da 5'9" featuring Pusha T and Rick Ross)	2016	Ryan Snyder
"Night Riders" (Major Lazer featuring Pusha T, 2 Chainz, Mad Cobra and Travis Scott)	2016	KILLDEATH
"Too Young" (Zeds Dead featuring Pusha T & Rivers Cuomo)	2016	Chris Ullens
"G Train" (Third Story featuring Pusha T)	2016	—N/a
"Choices" (Tracey T featuring Rick Ross & Pusha T)	2017	—N/a
"Good Goodbye" (Linkin Park featuring Pusha T and Stormzy)	2017	Isaac Rentz
"OMG" (Vic Mensa featuring Pusha T)	2017	—N/a
"Words of Wisdom" (Don Q featuring Pusha T)	2018	—N/a
"Summer on Lock" (Royce da 5'9" featuring Fabolous, Jadakiss and Pusha T)	2018	—N/a
"Miami" (Valee featuring Pusha T)	2018	—N/a
"Nightmares Are Real" (Cordae featuring Pusha T)	2019	—N/a
"Hunting Season" (Jadakiss featuring Pusha T)	2020	—N/a
"Dancing with the Devil" (Babyface Ray featuring Pusha T)	2022	—N/a
"Lights Please" (Khi Infinite featuring Chase B & Pusha T)	2023	—N/a
"Mr. Put That Shit On" (CyHi da Prynce featuring Pusha T)	2023	—N/a
"Problems (Triangle Park Mix)" (Ray Vaughn featuring Pusha T)	2024	—N/a
"OMG" (YG featuring Pusha T)	2026	Kid Art

== See also ==
- Clipse discography
