= The Games We Play (disambiguation) =

== Film and Television ==
- "The Games We Play", an episode from Where the Heart Is (UK TV series)
- "The Games We Play", a short by Annika Marks with Thomas Sadoski

== Music ==
- "The Games We Play" is a song by Pusha T
- "The Games We Play", a song by Andreas Johnson from Liebling (album) and compilation The Collector (album)
- "The Games We Play", a song by The Hollies from Evolution (The Hollies album)
- "The Games We Play", a song by Anekdoten from Gravity (Anekdoten album) 2003
