= Project X (soundtrack) =

Project X (Original Motion Picture Soundtrack)

Soundtrack album by Various artists
- Released: February 28, 2012
- Length: 53:55
- Label: WaterTower Music

Project X (Original Motion Picture Soundtrack) is the soundtrack to the 2012 film Project X, released on iTunes and on CD on February 28, 2012, by WaterTower Music. The album features 13 tracks which appeared throughout the film, with songs by Kid Cudi, D12, MGK, Nas, and Pusha T. A deluxe edition featuring 18 tracks was released on June 19, 2012.

== Reception ==
Jason Lymangrover of AllMusic called it as "a likable mix, and ultimately there isn't a song here that would slow down the momentum in a keg party."

== Commercial performance ==
The score spent 18 weeks on the US Billboard 200, where it peaked at number 12. The album reached number five on the Top Digital Albums, number one on the Top Soundtracks and Top Independent Albums, and number three on the Top Rap Albums and Top R&B/Hip-Hop Albums. It also charted on the Top Canadian Albums at number eight, the Swiss Albums Chart at number 73, the French Albums Chart at number 20, and the Belgian Ultratop 50 Albums Charts at number 66 in Flanders and number 29 in Wallonia. In the United States, the album was the number 6 selling soundtrack album of 2012, selling approximately 217,000 units.

== Track listing ==
Project X (Original Motion Picture Soundtrack)
No.	Title	Artist	Length
1.	"Trouble on My Mind"	Pusha T (feat. Tyler, the Creator)	2:04
2.	"Bitch Betta Have My Money"	AMG	3:16
3.	"Tipsy (Club Mix)"	J-Kwon	4:03
4.	"Candy"	Far East Movement (feat. Pitbull)	3:58
5.	"Ray Ban Vision"	A-Trak	3:35
6.	"Le Disko (Boys Noize Fire Mix)"	Shiny Toy Guns	5:55
7.	"Nasty"	Nas	3:04
8.	"Pursuit of Happiness (Steve Aoki Remix)"	Kid Cudi	6:13
9.	"Heads Will Roll (A-Trak Remix)"	Yeah Yeah Yeahs	6:23
10.	"Pretty Girls (Benny Benassi remix)"	Wale	4:13
11.	"The Next Episode"	Dr. Dre & Snoop Dogg	2:42
12.	"Fight Music"	D12	4:21
13.	"Wild Boy (Ricky Luna Remix)"	Machine Gun Kelly	4:08
Total length:			53:55

Project X (Original Motion Picture Soundtrack) (Deluxe Edition)
No.	Title	Artist	Length
1.	"We Want Some Pussy"	2 Live Crew	2:47
2.	"Trouble on My Mind"	Pusha T featuring Tyler, the Creator	2:04
3.	"Bitch Betta Have My Money"	AMG	3:16
4.	"Psychic City (Clasixx Remix)"	Yacht	4:12
5.	"Tipsy (Club Mix)"	J-Kwon	4:03
6.	"Candy"	Far East Movement featuring Pitbull	3:58
7.	"Blow Up"	J. Cole	5:04
8.	"Ray Ban Vision"	A-Trak	3:35
9.	"Le Disko (Boys Noize Fire Mix)"	Shiny Toy Guns	5:55
10.	"Nasty"	Nas	3:04
11.	"Pursuit of Happiness (Steve Aoki Remix)"	Kid Cudi	6:13
12.	"Heads Will Roll (A-Trak Remix)"	Yeah Yeah Yeahs	6:23
13.	"Despicable Dogs (Washed Out Remix)"	Small Black	4:10
14.	"Pretty Girls (Benny Benassi Remix)"	Wale	4:13
15.	"She Just Likes to Fight"	Four Tet	4:30
16.	"The Next Episode"	Dr. Dre & Snoop Dogg	2:42
17.	"Fight Music"	D12	4:21
18.	"Wild Boy (Ricky Luna Remix)"	Machine Gun Kelly	4:08
Total length:			76:07

== Chart performance ==
=== Weekly charts ===
Chart (2012)	Peak position
Belgian Albums (Ultratop Flanders)	66
Belgian Albums (Ultratop Wallonia)	25
Canadian Albums (Billboard)	8
French Albums (SNEP)	20
Swiss Albums (Schweizer Hitparade)	73
UK Compilation Albums (OCC)	19
UK Album Downloads (OCC)	32
UK Soundtrack Albums (OCC)	2
US Billboard 200	12
US Top Current Album Sales (Billboard)	10
US Top Digital Albums (Billboard)	5
US Top Independent Albums (Billboard)	1
US Top R&B/Hip-Hop Albums (Billboard)	3
US Top Rap Albums (Billboard)	3
US Top Soundtracks (Billboard)	1

=== Year-end charts ===
Chart (2012)	Position
US Billboard 200	160
US Independent Albums (Billboard)	15
US R&B/Hip-Hop Albums (Billboard)	30
US Rap Albums (Billboard)	22
US Soundtrack Albums (Billboard)	6
Chart (2013)	Position
US R&B/Hip-Hop Albums (Billboard)	64
US Soundtrack Albums (Billboard)	18

== Accolades ==
Year	Award	Category	Recipient	Result	Ref.
2012	MTV Movie Awards	Best Music	"Pursuit of Happiness" by Kid Cudi (Steve Aoki remix)	Nominated	
