= Neck & Wrist =

2022 single by Pusha T featuring Jay-Z and Pharrell Williams

Single by Pusha T featuring Jay-Z and Pharrell Williams

from the album It's Almost Dry
- Released: April 6, 2022
- Genre: Hip hop
- Length: 3:29
- Label: GOOD; Def Jam
- Songwriters: Terrence Thornton; Shawn Carter; Pharrell Williams
- Producer: Pharrell Williams

Pusha T singles chronology
"Hear Me Clearly" (2022)	"Neck & Wrist" (2022)	"Scrape It Off" (2022)

Jay-Z singles chronology
"What It Feels Like" (2021)	"Neck & Wrist" (2022)	"Morning Dew (Donk) (Remix)" (2026)

Pharrell Williams singles chronology
"Tamagotchi" (2022)	"Neck & Wrist" (2022)	"Cash In Cash Out" (2022)

"Neck & Wrist" is a song by American rapper Pusha T featuring fellow American rappers Jay-Z and Pharrell Williams. Produced by the latter, it was released on April 6, 2022 as the third single from Pusha's fourth studio album It's Almost Dry (2022).

== Background ==
In 2020, actor and comedian Faizon Love claimed that Jay-Z had been lying about his drug-dealing past. Jay-Z addresses Love's comments in the song.

The artwork of the single was created by Sterling Ruby, who also previously designed the artwork for Pusha T's single "Diet Coke".

== Composition and lyrics ==
The song finds Pusha T and Jay-Z reflecting on their music careers and the benefits of their luxurious lifestyles, over an instrumental of heavy drum beats. In his verse, Jay-Z begins with responding to Faizon Love's claims ("The phase I'm on, love, I wouldn't believe it either / I'd be like, 'Jay-Z's a cheater,' I wouldn't listen to reason either"), and raps that if The Notorious B.I.G. were alive, he and him would have dominated the New York hip hop scene as The Commission, a supergroup that Jay-Z and B.I.G. had planned to form before the latter's death.

== Critical reception ==
Jessica McKinney of Complex praised the song's cocaine metaphors and called Jay-Z's performance "captivating".

== Response ==
Fans have speculated that Jay-Z had dissed American rapper Birdman in the song with the lyrics, "I blew bird money, y'all talk in Twitter feeds". Audio engineer Young Guru, a longtime collaborator and associate of Jay-Z, suggested that the line could have multiple meanings behind it and stated it was not a diss toward Birdman.

In an interview with VladTV around a week after the song was released, Faizon Love denied that Jay-Z had dissed him.

== Charts ==
Chart performance for "Neck & Wrist"
Chart (2022)	Peak position
Canada Hot 100 (Billboard)	69
Global 200 (Billboard)	148
South Africa Streaming (TOSAC)	46
US Billboard Hot 100	76
US Hot R&B/Hip-Hop Songs (Billboard)	23
