= If You Know You Know =

2018 song by Pusha T

Song by Pusha T

from the album Daytona
- Released: May 25, 2018
- Genre: Hip hop
- Length: 3:22
- Label: GOOD; Def Jam
- Songwriters: Terrence Thornton; Kanye West; Al Gwylit; Richard Nisbet
- Producer: West

Music video
- "If You Know You Know" on YouTube

"If You Know You Know" is a song by American rapper Pusha T from his third studio album Daytona (2018). Produced by Kanye West, it contains a sample of "Twelve O' Clock Santanial" by the 1970s Michigan hard rock band Air.

== Composition ==
In the beginning of the song, Pusha T raps over light snares, alluding to his criminal past and criticizing rappers who pretend to be involved in illegal drug trade while referencing Pink Floyd, Trugoy the Dove, "Niggas in Paris" producer Hit-Boy, "Throw Some D's" and Rich Boy, before the beat drops. The main production contains ticking hi-hats, as well as snippets of ragga chants and a digital dancehall rhythm which are sampled from "Twelve O' Clock Santanial". Lyrically, Pusha T references his history of dealing drugs; he imagines being part of a "fraternity of drug dealers" who have reformed, takes credit for "showing rappers how to stand on the front lines when trappers started throwing bands", and implies that only those who are or have participated in drug dealing will fully comprehend his lyrics ("If you know, you know").

== Critical reception ==
The song was well received by music critics. Ben Devlin of MusicOMH stated, "Pusha T's subject matter is well worn by now, his drug kingpin boasts familiar to anyone with an interest in American rap. His wordplay makes it, the hook of opening track If You Know You Know being a prime example". William Ketchum III of HipHopDX was favorable of Kanye West's influence, commenting that the song "shows off Ye's expert vocal chops". Gary Suarez of Consequence of Sound wrote "The flawless opening lines of 'If You Know You Know' capture everything America has come to love about capitalist rap, that by-any-means braggadocio of self-made men and their flashy trophies." Reviewing Daytona for The New York Times, Jon Caramanica wrote "On songs like 'If You Know You Know,' he sometimes raps so crisply and sparsely — 'A rapper turned trapper can't morph into us / But a trapper turned rapper can morph into Puff' — that he almost feels disconnected from the song's rhythm." Anthony Henderson of The Quietus called the song "sonically dense" and described it as "an energised, low-key banger which works with an appealingly teasing premise: no matter what, certain (read: most) of the population will never be able to totally unpack his coded language." Matthew St. Cyr of RapReviews praised Pusha T "showing the rest of us mortals how to flip a drug metaphor like a professional".

== Live performances ==
Pusha T performed the song on Jimmy Kimmel Live! on June 1, 2018.

== Music video ==
The music video premiered on June 13, 2018, exclusively on Spotify in vertical format, before later being expanded in horizontal format and released to other platforms on June 20, 2018. Directed by Shomi Patwary, it sees Pusha T driving in a white Ferrari through a desert road in Joshua Tree National Park at sunset and rapping. He is pulled over by a police officer, who calls for backup. Soon, there are three police cars at the scene along with a dog and drone. A group of officers corner and hold Pusha T at gunpoint, preparing to interrogate him. As he steps out of the car with his hands behind his head, lightning flashes across the sky and dogs snarl. Nevertheless, Pusha remains calm and collected without fear, and raps amid red and blue siren lights.

== Charts ==
Chart (2018)	Peak position
Canada (Canadian Hot 100)	92
New Zealand Heatseeker Singles (RMNZ)	7
UK Singles (OCC)	93
US Billboard Hot 100	73
US Hot R&B/Hip-Hop Songs (Billboard)	35

== Certifications ==
Region	Certification	Certified units/sales
United States (RIAA)	Gold	500,000^{‡}
^{‡} Sales+streaming figures based on certification alone.
