= Scrape It Off =

2022 single by Pusha T featuring Lil Uzi Vert and Don Toliver

Single by Pusha T featuring Lil Uzi Vert and Don Toliver

from the album It's Almost Dry
- Released: May 10, 2022
- Length: 2:32
- Label: GOOD; Def Jam
- Songwriters: Terrence Thornton; Symere Woods; Caleb Toliver; Pharrell Williams
- Producer: Williams

Pusha T singles chronology
"Neck & Wrist" (2022)	"Scrape It Off" (2022)	"Haha" (2022)

Lil Uzi Vert singles chronology
"Heavy" (2022)	"Scrape It Off" (2022)	"Lunchroom" (2022)

Don Toliver singles chronology
"Honest" (2022)	"Scrape It Off" (2022)	"One Time" (2022)

"Scrape It Off" is a song by American rapper Pusha T featuring fellow American rappers Lil Uzi Vert and Don Toliver. It was sent to urban contemporary radio on May 10, 2022 as the fourth single from Pusha T's fourth studio album It's Almost Dry (2022). The song was produced by Pharrell Williams.

== Critical reception ==
The song received generally positive reviews from music critics. Will Dukes of Rolling Stone described it as "all verdant keyboards and sensual bass, with a soothing Don Tolliver hook." Aron A. of HotNewHipHop gave the song a "Very Hottt" rating and wrote, "Push and Uzi spit pure quotables on the record as they celebrate their fleet of foreign cars and residences in private communities. Meanwhile, Don Toliver's smooth harmonies produce an infectious hook layered onto Pharrell's spacey production." Austin Williams of Vibe called the song an "obligatory party record", adding, "The song is fun, but we can't lie, we were a little nervous throughout much of Push's verse—up until the very last line, it seemed like he'd go the entire song without a single bar referencing drug dealing, making it a first for the album." AllMusic and Paul A. Thompson of Pitchfork both praised the Pharrell's production of the song.

Anthony Malone of HipHopDX wrote a negative response to the song in his review of It's Almost Dry, calling it "another robotic performance from Don Toliver and an out-of-place Lil Uzi Vert verse that makes it hard to believe this is a Pusha T album" and regarding it as a "cheap attempt" at making a radio hit.

== Charts ==
Chart performance for "Scrape It Off"
Chart (2022)	Peak position
Canada Hot 100 (Billboard)	41
Global 200 (Billboard)	80
New Zealand Hot Singles (RMNZ)	7
South Africa Streaming (TOSAC)	77
US Billboard Hot 100	59
US Hot R&B/Hip-Hop Songs (Billboard)	17
US Rhythmic Airplay (Billboard)	25
