= King Push – Darkest Before Dawn: The Prelude =

2015 studio album by Pusha T

Studio album by Pusha T
- Released: December 18, 2015
- Recorded: 2013–2015
- Genre: Hip-hop
- Length: 33:13
- Labels: GOOD; Def Jam
- Producers: Pusha T (exec.); Puff Daddy (also exec.); Steven Victor (exec.); Baauer; Deafh Beats; Boi-1da; Donald Davidson; Frank Dukes; G Koop; Honorable C.N.O.T.E.; Hudson Mohawke; J. Cole; Kanye West; Mario Winans; Metro Boomin; Milli Beatz; Nashiem Myrick; Q-Tip; Sean C & LV; The-Dream; Timbaland; Yung Dev

Pusha T chronology
My Name Is My Name (2013)	King Push – Darkest Before Dawn: The Prelude (2015)	Daytona (2018)

Singles from King Push – Darkest Before Dawn: The Prelude
- 1. "Untouchable" Released: November 12, 2015; 2. "M.F.T.R" Released: December 8, 2015; 3. "Crutches, Crosses, Caskets" Released: December 11, 2015

King Push – Darkest Before Dawn: The Prelude is the second studio album by American rapper Pusha T. It was released on December 18, 2015, by GOOD Music and Def Jam Recordings. The album was supported by three singles: "Untouchable", "M.F.T.R." featuring The-Dream and "Crutches, Crosses, Caskets". The album features guest appearances from The-Dream, Kanye West, ASAP Rocky, Ab-Liva, Beanie Sigel, Kehlani and Jill Scott, with production handled by a variety of high-profile record producers, including Kanye West, J. Cole, Timbaland, Q-Tip, Metro Boomin, Boi-1da, Hudson Mohawke and Puff Daddy, among others.

The album serves as a prelude for his third solo album, Daytona (originally titled King Push), which was released on May 25, 2018. King Push – Darkest Before Dawn: The Prelude received widespread acclaim from critics, who highly praised its unique lyricism and experimental production.

== Background ==
In April 2013, in an interview with AskMen; Pusha T revealed that after the release of his debut album, he would be finishing the work on his second album, titled King Push.

In July 2014, in an interview with XXL; when asked about his plans for his next album King Push, Pusha T said: “This next album is like a heavy proclamation to me. I told people last year I had the 'Album Of the Year'. And I felt that I did. I really feel that King Push has to live up to that same hip-hop expectation… My goal is always to have 'hip-hop Album of the Year'.”

== Release and promotion ==
On November 19, 2014, Pusha T released the promotional single, titled "Lunch Money"; which was produced by Kanye West. In December 2014, Pusha T announced his second album King Push, for a Spring 2015 release. In May 2015, he had announced that his second album would be released in June 2015. In November 2015, Pusha T revealed that he would be releasing an album, before his much anticipated project King Push and that his album King Push - Darkest Before Dawn - The Prelude would be released on December 18, 2015.

In promotion for the album, Pusha T released a trailer for his short film on November 26, 2015. The short film was released on December 11, 2015, exclusively on TIDAL, starring Natalya Rudakova, Rotimi, and directed by Kid Art. The album was made available for pre-order on December 11 as well, with the songs "Untouchable", "M.F.T.R." and "Crutches, Crosses, Caskets", were released as "instant gratification tracks", to those who would be purchasing this album.

== Music and lyrics ==
For each of the singles "Untouchable", "M.F.T.R." and "Crutches, Crosses, Caskets", Pusha T premiered the lyrics on Genius, before releasing the audio, as a marketing technique.

== Singles ==
On November 12, 2015, Pusha T released a song, titled "Untouchable", as the first single for the album.

== Critical reception ==
Professional ratings
Aggregate scores
Source	Rating
AnyDecentMusic?	8.0/10
Metacritic	85/100
Review scores
Source	Rating
AllMusic	4/5 stars
The A.V. Club	A−
Billboard	4/5 stars
The Guardian	4/5 stars
NME	4/5
The Observer	4/5 stars
Pitchfork	8.2/10
Q	4/5 stars
Rolling Stone	3.5/5 stars
Spin	8/10

Darkest Before Dawn received widespread acclaim from critics. At Metacritic, which assigns a normalized rating out of 100 to reviews from mainstream critics, the album received an average score of 85, based on 22 reviews. Christopher Weingarten of Rolling Stone stated, "Though hip-hop gets more melodic and vocally expressive every year, Pusha keeps his cadences steely and his bars hitting like haymakers, maintaining that ice-cold Nineties feel even when he’s taking on modern troubles." Corbin Reiff of The A.V. Club considered it a worthy prelude to King Push and praised the dark tone of the album, "The mood is set right from the beginning on “Intro,” which opens with an array of synth sounds reminiscent of the score to Stanley Kubrick's A Clockwork Orange before slamming into a rhythm that's all boom and no bap. That foreboding tone is carried forward through the rest of the record." Erin Lowers of Exclaim! wrote that "the weight of Darkest Before Dawn doesn't simply rest on Pusha T's lyrical weight (literal and figuratively), but also his ability to tap into the strengths of his producers, like Boi-1da's thunderous drums, Kanye West's soulful grandeur or Timbaland's unorthodox layering."

== Track listing ==
No.	Title	Writer(s)	Producer(s)	Length
1.	"Intro"	Terrence Thornton; Leland Wayne; Robert Mandell	Metro Boomin; Sean "Puff Daddy" Combs; G Koop^{[a]}	2:33
2.	"Untouchable"	Thornton; Timothy Mosley; Jetmir Milli Salii; Christopher Wallace; Sean Hamilton; Tracey Horton; Mark Richardson	Timbaland; Milli Beatz	3:12
3.	"M.F.T.R." (featuring The-Dream)	Thornton; Matthew Samuels; Adam Feeney; Terius Nash	Boi-1da; Frank Dukes; Hudson Mohawke^{[a]}; The-Dream^{[a]}	4:10
4.	"Crutches, Crosses, Caskets"	Thornton; Mario Winans; Carlton Mays; Maurice Jordan	Puff Daddy; Mario Winans; Sean C & LV^{[a]}; Honorable C.N.O.T.E.^{[a]}; Yung Dev^{[a]}	2:26
5.	"M.P.A." (featuring Kanye West, A$AP Rocky and The-Dream)	Thornton; Kanye West; Che Pope; Mark Batson; Rakim Mayers; Nash	West; Pope; J. Cole^{[a]}	4:46
6.	"Got Em Covered" (featuring Ab-Liva)	Thornton; Mosley; Salii; Shawn Carter; Ricardo Thomas	Timbaland; Milli Beatz	3:16
7.	"Keep Dealing" (featuring Beanie Sigel)	Thornton; Nashiem Myrick; Donald Davidson; Dwight Grant	Puff Daddy; Myrick; Davidson	4:11
8.	"Retribution" (featuring Kehlani)	Thornton; Rico Love; Bobby Barrett	Timbaland; Deafh Beats	3:20
9.	"F.I.F.A."	Thornton; Kamaal Fareed	Q-Tip	2:19
10.	"Sunshine" (featuring Jill Scott)	Gianfranco Reverberi; Claudio Ghiglino; Susan Duncan-Smith	Baauer; West; Mano	3:13
Total length:				33:13

Notes

- ^{^[a]} signifies an additional producer.
- "Intro" features additional vocals by Lee Sanchez and G Koop.

Sample credits

- "Intro" contains a sample from a reference track made for Kanye West's Yeezus album titled "No More Games" performed by Chantal Kreviazuk.
- "Untouchable" contains a sample from "Think B.I.G." performed by The Notorious B.I.G., written by Christopher Wallace.
- "M.P.A." contains a sample from "Konklusjon" performed by Good News, written by Finn Pedersen.
- "Got Em Covered" contains an interpolation from "Squeeze 1st" performed and written by Shawn Carter and Ricardo Thomas.
- "F.I.F.A." contains a sample from "Tout Au Pas" performed by Jean-Philippe Goude.
- "Sunshine" contains an interpolation of "Workin' My Way" performed by Alexander, written by Gianfranco Reverberi, Claudio Ghiglino and Susan Duncan-Smith.

== Charts ==
=== Weekly charts ===
Weekly chart performance for King Push – Darkest Before Dawn: The Prelude
Chart (2015)	Peak position
UK R&B Albums (Official Charts)	16
US Billboard 200	20
US Top R&B/Hip-Hop Albums (Billboard)	3

=== Year-end charts ===
Year-end chart performance for King Push – Darkest Before Dawn: The Prelude
Chart (2016)	Position
US Top R&B/Hip-Hop Albums (Billboard)	48
