= Fear of God II: Let Us Pray =

EP by Pusha T
- Released: November 8, 2011
- Recorded: 2010–11
- Genre: Hip-hop
- Length: 45:04
- Label: Re-Up Gang; GOOD; Decon
- Producer: Pusha T (exec.); Rennard East (co-exec.); Rico Beats; The VIPs; Shawty Redd; The Neptunes; Left Brain; A-Traxx; Bangladesh; Hit-Boy; Tha Bizness; Deezy; Lee Major; Nottz

Pusha T chronology
Fear of God (2011)	Fear of God II: Let Us Pray (2011)	Wrath of Caine (2013)

Singles from Fear of God II: Let Us Pray
- 1. "Trouble on My Mind" Released: July 12, 2011; 2. "Amen" Released: September 13, 2011; 3. "My God" Released: March 29, 2012

Fear of God II: Let Us Pray is the major label debut extended play by American rapper Pusha T, released on November 8, 2011, under Decon Records, GOOD Music and Re-Up Gang Records. The EP was his first project with Kanye West's GOOD Music label, since the announcement of his signing in September 2010. The EP was executively produced by Pusha T himself, alongside fellow Re-Up Gang member Rennard East. Additional production was provided by Rico Beats, Shawty Redd, The Neptunes, Left Brain of Odd Future, Bangladesh, Hit-Boy, Tha Bizness, and Lee Major of the Inkredibles, alongside others. The album features guest appearances from GOOD Music founder Kanye West, alongside Sean Combs, Jeezy (then known as "Young Jeezy"), Tyler, the Creator, Juicy J of Three 6 Mafia, Meek Mill, French Montana, Kevin Cossom, 50 Cent, Pharrell Williams, Rick Ross, and fellow Re-Up Gang member Ab-Liva.

The EP doubles as both a sequel to and a re-release of Pusha T's debut solo mixtape, Fear of God (2011), released on the 21st of March, 2011. The EP adds four additional songs to the original mixtape's track listing. Three singles were released from the project, including "Trouble on My Mind" (featuring Tyler, the Creator) on the 12th of July, 2011, "Amen" (featuring Kanye West and Jeezy) on the 13th of September, 2011, and "My God" on the 29th of March, 2012. The EP itself was positively received by music critics, and charted at number 66 on the Billboard 200, alongside peaking within the top 10 of the Top R&B/Hip-Hop Albums and Top Rap Albums charts in the United States.

== Background and release ==
Pusha T established his solo career around mid-2010, while he was still in the Clipse with Malice. He notably appeared on "Runaway" and "So Appalled", from Kanye West's fifth studio album, My Beautiful Dark Twisted Fantasy (2010), propagating his features. He was later signed to West's GOOD Music label in September 2010. On March 21, 2011, Pusha T released his first solo work, a mixtape titled Fear of God. Released independently, it included features from West, 50 Cent, Rick Ross, Pharrell Williams and Kevin Cossom. Pusha T claims his inspiration for Fear of God is that a vast majority of the people who he came in the music business with are in prison: "I came in the game with super producers. We made hit records. I never thought that it gets deeper. But not for nothing, 2009 I lost eight of my friends to incarceration. Everybody that I came in to the rap game with, and when I realized that those components weren't there anymore, the 'Fear of God' really came over me. It's full of the dichotomy of 'right and wrong' and 'good and evil'. A lot of it deals with greed. A lot of it deals with instant gratification. Personally... life without instant gratification... I don't know what it is." The EP is a re-release of the mixtape, which has different structure, production and additional tracks.

The EP was originally set to be released on June 21, 2011. It was than pushed back to August 23, and then delayed again to September 27, 2011. However, on October 6, 2011, Thornton announced a new release date of November 8, 2011. In addition, it was revealed that he added four more songs to the EP, making it 12 tracks rather than just the nine tracks that were previously announced. To begin promoting the album, he released a track produced by The Neptunes, titled "Trouble on My Mind", as the lead single, which features the frontman of rap collective Odd Future, Tyler, the Creator. The song "Amen" was originally meant for Young Jeezy and "Raid", originally meant for 50 Cent's third studio album, Curtis (2007), was released as the EP's second single. "My God" was then released as the third and final single to the EP. The track "Everything That Glitters" (featuring French Montana) is also included on DJ Drama's third album Third Power (2011). "What Dreams Are Made of" samples a Ric Flair promo.

== Singles and promotion ==
Three singles were released to promote the EP. The first was "Trouble on My Mind" (featuring Tyler, the Creator), which was released on July 12, 2011. Alongside its release, the song was accompanied by a music video, directed by Jason Goldwatch. The second single, "Amen" (featuring Kanye West and Young Jeezy), was released August 11, 2011. The third single, "My God", was released on the 29th of March, 2012, and received a music video directed by Pusha Ton and Ryan Reichenfeld. Despite not being released as singles, "What Dreams Are Made Of", "Feeling Myself" (featuring Kevin Cossom), and "Alone In Vegas" would also receive music videos, directed by Goldwatch, Taj Stansberry, and Orson Whales respectively.

== Reception ==
Professional ratings
Review scores
Source	Rating
Allmusic	4/5 stars
Robert Christgau	(A−)
HipHopDX	3.5/5 stars
Pitchfork Media	(7.1/10)
Rolling Stone	2.5/5 stars
XXL	(XL)

=== Critical response ===
Fear of God II: Let Us Pray received generally positive reviews from music critics. At Metacritic, which assigns a normalized rating out of 100 to reviews from mainstream critics, the album received an average score of 69, based on 17 reviews, which indicates "generally favorable reviews". In his consumer guide for MSN Music, critic Robert Christgau gave it an A− rating, indicating "the kind of garden-variety good record that is the great luxury of musical micromarketing and overproduction." Christgau quipped in his review, "The grand beats are safer than the clenched, confining, arrogantly hookless minimalism of Hell Hath No Fury. But every mean word delivers, and with cameos from Tyler the Creator to 50 Cent it's as if he never went solo."

=== Commercial performance ===
The album debuted at number 66 on the Billboard 200 with 8,900 copies sold in its first week released. It also entered at number ten on Billboard's R&B/Hip-Hop Albums, at number eight on Billboard's Top Rap Albums, and at number 25 on its Digital Albums chart. On the second week of its release the album sold 4,300 copies, bringing the total to 13,000 copies.

== Track listing ==
No.	Title	Writer(s)	Producer(s)	Length
1.	"Changing of the Guards" (featuring Diddy)	Terrence Thornton; Sean Combs; Ricardo Lamarre	Rico Beats	2:29
2.	"Amen" (featuring Kanye West and Young Jeezy)	Thornton; Kanye West; Jay Wayne Jenkins; Demetrius Stewart	Shawty Redd	4:36
3.	"Trouble on My Mind" (featuring Tyler, the Creator)	Thornton; Tyler Okonma; Pharrell Williams; Chad Hugo; Vyron Turner	The Neptunes; Left Brain	3:32
4.	"What Dreams Are Made Of"	Thornton	The VIPs	3:35
5.	"Body Work" (featuring Juicy J, Meek Mill, and French Montana)	Thornton; Jordan Michael Houston; Robert Williams; Karim Kharbouch; Lamarre	Rico Beats	4:29
6.	"Everything That Glitters" (featuring French Montana)	Thornton; Kharbouch	A-Traxx	3:29
7.	"So Obvious"	Thornton; Shondrae Crawford	Bangladesh	3:15
8.	"Feeling Myself" (featuring Kevin Cossom)	Thornton; Kevin Cossom	Tha Bizness	3:34
9.	"Raid" (featuring 50 Cent and Pharrell)	Thornton; Curtis Jackson; P. Williams; Hugo	The Neptunes	3:45
10.	"My God"	Thornton; Chauncey Hollis	Hit-Boy; Deezy (co.)	3:33
11.	"I Still Wanna" (featuring Rick Ross and Ab-Liva)	Thornton, William Leonard Roberts II; Rennard "Ab-Liva" East; Leigh Elliott	Lee Major	4:16
12.	"Alone in Vegas"	Thornton; Dominick Lamb	Nottz	4:31
Total length:				45:04

== Personnel ==
- Sean "Puffy" Combs – Composer
- P. Williams – Composer
- The Neptunes – Producer
- Kevin Cossom - Composer
- Kanye West – Composer
- Nottz – Producer
- Shawty Redd – Producer
- Fabian Marasciullo – Mixing
- Emeka Alams – Design
- Jason Goldwatch – Photography
- Tha Bizness – Producer
- Hit-Boy – Producer
- Dave Kutch – Mastering
- Lee Major – Producer
- Deezy – Producer
- Shondrae "Mr. Bangladesh" Crawford – Producer
- Steven Victor – A&R
- Terrence Thornton – Composer
- Terrence Thornton – Executive Producer
- Terrence Thornton – A&R
- Rennard East – Executive Producer
- Rennard East – A&R
- Elizabeth Gallardo – Assistant Engineer
- Rico Beats – Producer
- Rashid Anthony – Composer
- Rashid Anthony – Producer
- Omar Dubois – Creative Director
- The VIP's – Producer

== Charts ==
Chart (2011)	Peak position
US Billboard 200	66
US Top Digital Albums	25
US Top R&B/Hip-Hop Albums	10
US Top Rap Albums	8
