= Trouble on My Mind =

Single by Pusha T featuring Tyler, the Creator

from the album Fear of God II: Let Us Pray
- Released: July 12, 2011
- Recorded: 2011
- Genre: Alternative hip-hop; hardcore hip-hop
- Length: 3:33
- Label: GOOD; Re-Up; Decon
- Songwriters: Terrence Thornton; Tyler Okonma; Pharrell Williams; Chad Hugo; Vyron Turner
- Producers: The Neptunes; Left Brain

Pusha T singles chronology
| "Runaway" (2010) | "Trouble on My Mind" (2011) | "What Do You Take Me For?" (2011) |

Tyler, the Creator singles chronology
| "She" (2011) | "Trouble on My Mind" (2011) | "Domo23" (2013) |

Music video
- "Trouble on My Mind" on YouTube

"Trouble on My Mind" is a song by American rapper Pusha T, featuring fellow American rapper Tyler, the Creator, released as the lead single from his debut extended play (EP) Fear of God II: Let Us Pray (2011), through GOOD Music, Re-Up, and Decon Records. The track, an alternative hip-hop and hardcore hip-hop record, was recorded in 2011, and was written by Pusha and Tyler, alongside its producers, The Neptunes and Left Brain, the latter being a member of Odd Future alongside Tyler around that time. The song was released on the July 12, 2011, alongside a music video directed by Jason Goldwatch eight days later. It would later be included in the film Project X (2012), appearing on its soundtrack.

== Release and promotion ==
The song was unveiled on July 8, 2011, and previewed via RedBullUSA.com. It would later be officially released on July 12, 2011, through iTunes and Amazon. On July 15, 2011, a behind-the-scenes look at an upcoming music video was released. The official music video, directed by Jason Goldwatch and filmed in Los Angeles, California, was released July 20, 2011. The video features cameos from the rest of Odd Future. In the video, Pusha T is dressed in the style of Tyler the Creator, "down to the cutoff shorts, striped knee-high socks, and kitty T-shirt", while Tyler is "dressed like Pusha-gangsta shit". In 2012, the track was included on the soundtrack of the film Project X.

== Critical reception ==
Amos Barshad, writing for Vulture, described the song as "the kind of spare, ominous Neptunes beat Pusha's been murdering for a decade-plus. Barshad liked Tyler's feature, through idiosyncratic and technically less proficient than Pusha, it "works great for him". Meanwhile, Tyler's verses were met with more criticism than Pusha T's.

== Release information ==
| Country | Date | Format | Label | Ref |
|---|---|---|---|---|
| United States | July 12, 2011 | Digital download | GOOD Music | |
