= The Games We Play =

2018 song by Pusha T

Song by Pusha T

from the album Daytona
- Released: May 25, 2018
- Recorded: September 5, 2017 – 2018
- Studio: West's ranch in Jackson Hole, Wyoming
- Genre: Hip hop
- Length: 2:46
- Label: GOOD; Def Jam
- Songwriters: Terrence Thornton; Kanye West; Andrew Dawson; Booker T. Averheart; Cynthia Biggs El; Shawn Carter; Dexter Wansel; David Anthony Willis
- Producers: West; Dawson (add.)

"The Games We Play" is a song by American rapper Pusha T, released on May 25, 2018, as the second track from his third studio album, Daytona.

== Background ==
Pusha took to the lyrics website Genius to explain the track's lyrical content in June 2018.

== Commercial performance ==
Upon the release of Daytona, "The Games We Play" charted at number 100 on the US Billboard Hot 100 and number 50 on the Hot R&B/Hip-Hop Songs chart.

== Charts ==
| Chart (2018) | Peak position |
|---|---|
| US Billboard Hot 100 | 100 |
| US Hot R&B/Hip-Hop Songs (Billboard) | 50 |
