= Daytona (album) =

2018 studio album by Pusha T

Studio album by Pusha T
- Released: May 25, 2018
- Recorded: 2017–2018
- Studios: West Lake Ranch, Jackson Hole, Wyoming
- Genre: Hip-hop
- Length: 21:10
- Labels: GOOD; Def Jam
- Producer: Kanye West

Pusha T chronology
King Push – Darkest Before Dawn: The Prelude (2015)	Daytona (2018)	It's Almost Dry (2022)

Daytona (stylized in all caps) is the third studio album by American rapper Pusha T. It was released on May 25, 2018, by GOOD Music and Def Jam Recordings. The album features guest appearances from Rick Ross and Kanye West, with additional vocals by Tony Williams and 070 Shake. West also served as executive producer and produced all of its tracks, with additional production from Andrew Dawson, Mike Dean, and Pi'erre Bourne.

Daytona is the first of five albums produced by West in Jackson Hole, Wyoming, in what became known as the "Wyoming Sessions", released in 2018, with a seven-track album being released every week. The album preceded the release of West's eighth studio album Ye, West's collaboration with Kid Cudi titled Kids See Ghosts, Nas's eleventh studio album Nasir, and Teyana Taylor's second studio album K.T.S.E..

Daytona debuted at number three on the US Billboard 200 with 77,000 album-equivalent units, of which 39,000 were pure album sales. The album received widespread critical acclaim from music critics and was considered by many major publications to be one of the best albums of 2018 and the decade. The album received a nomination for Best Rap Album at the 2019 Grammy Awards.

== Background ==
In December 2015, Pusha T released the album King Push – Darkest Before Dawn: The Prelude, which was set to serve as a prelude to his third album, King Push. However, the album suffered from numerous delays, and under the new title Daytona, it was announced by Kanye West via Twitter on April 19, 2018, alongside the album's release date.

Pusha T explained the title of the album by stating: "I changed the album title from King Push to Daytona because I felt it didn't represent the overall message of this body of work. Daytona represents the fact that I have the luxury of time. That luxury only comes when you have a skill set that you're confident in."

== Recording and production ==
Recording sessions for the album took place in Jackson, Wyoming, and Utah from 2017 to May 2018. Initial production for the album featured a variety of high profiled producers, however the original material was scrapped in favor of Kanye West producing the entire album. Production influences came from creating individual song lists and sampling. The album contained ten unique samples across its seven tracks, making it the most sample-dense project to come out of the Wyoming Sessions.

Songs recorded for the album include "Sociopath", featuring guest vocals from Kanye West and Kash Doll. "Sociopath" leaked in April 2019 and was later officially released as a single in August 2019, along with "Coming Home", which features Lauryn Hill, which was also rumored to be intended for Daytona.

The album was officially completed on May 23, 2018, two days before digital release.

== Artwork ==
The original artwork for Daytona was replaced a few days before the album's release, with the official artwork showing a picture of now-deceased singer Whitney Houston's drug paraphernalia-littered bathroom. The licensing for the artwork cost $85,000, paid by Kanye West. Houston's ex-husband Bobby Brown criticized the cover, saying it was in "really really bad taste".

== Controversy ==
Canadian rapper Drake responded to the song "Infrared", which addressed Drake and his ghostwriting rumors, by releasing a diss track titled "Duppy Freestyle" on May 25, 2018, which heavily sampled "Ever So Lovingly" by Táta Vega. The song garnered significant media attention, as well as a response from Pusha T on Twitter. Four days later, Pusha T responded with his own song titled "The Story of Adidon", which alleges that Drake was secretly the father of a porn star's child. Drake would later go on to confirm this on his own album, Scorpion, a few weeks later. Drake alleges that the child information was leaked by Kanye West, but Pusha T alleges that Drake's producer, 40, leaked the info to a woman he slept with.

== Critical reception ==
Professional ratings
Aggregate scores
Source	Rating
AnyDecentMusic?	8.2/10
Metacritic	86/100
Review scores
Source	Rating
AllMusic	4/5 stars
The A.V. Club	A−
Consequence of Sound	A−
The Guardian	4/5 stars
Mojo	4/5 stars
The New Zealand Herald	5/5 stars
The Observer	3/5 stars
Pitchfork	8.3/10
Rolling Stone	4/5 stars
Vice (Expert Witness)	A

Daytona received widespread acclaim from critics. At Metacritic, which assigns a normalized rating out of 100 to reviews from mainstream publications, the album received an average score of 86 based on 22 reviews, indicating "universal acclaim". Paul A. Thompson of Pitchfork described the album as "a near-airtight exercise in flair and focus", stating that "it shirks the bloat and radio concessions of Darkest Before Dawn and, to a greater extent, his 2013 debut album, My Name Is My Name. The beats – sample-heavy and produced entirely by Kanye – are uniformly excellent and let you see the seams: It's like an album full of "Bound 2"'s, without the sentimentality", concluding that the album is "Pusha's best work as a solo artist". Ben Beaumont-Thomas of The Guardian stated that "Each track is an elocution lesson, his bars enunciated with the almost pedantic menace of a bad cop explaining what he plans to do to you", describing the lyricism as "crisply brilliant drug poetry" and commending the production. Yoh Phillips of DJBooth wrote that Daytona "puts on display a maximized portrait of potent potential realized. After knocking at this door for years, Pusha has finally made an undeniable breakthrough. His words are razor sharp, his lyricism blessed by the kind of beats that allow him a beautiful ring to box in."

Clayton Purdom of The A.V. Club expressed that Daytona is "an absolute masterpiece of minimalism", complimenting both the album's production and lyricism. Kyle Mullin of Exclaim! stated that the album "boasts a mostly sinewy and understated sound that'll leave hip-hop heads in revelry". Online hip hop publication HipHopDX wrote that Daytona provides "a fitting backdrop for some of the most grim, relentlessly murderous raps Pusha has ever rhymed", also crediting West's production and the album's run time.

Daytona was ranked the 18th best release of the year in The Wire magazine's annual critics' poll. Uproxx cited the album as one of the best rap releases of 2018. Complex magazine named Daytona the number 1 album of the year. He was also named Best Rapper Alive in 2018 by Complex for his work on the album Daytona. In 2019, Pitchfork ranked Daytona at number 188 in their list of "The 200 Best Albums of the 2010s"; staff writer Alphonse Pierre wrote: "Daytona is the full realization of Pusha as a star...for all the storylines and drama that surrounded Daytona, the music rises above."

=== Accolades ===
In 2019, NME named it the 82nd best album of the 2010s decade. Rolling Stone listed it 74th in its top 100 albums of the decade list. Pitchfork listed it 188 on their top 200 albums of the decade. Paste named it the 18th best hip-hop album of the 2010s.

Year-end lists
Publication	List	Rank	Ref.
Esquire	The Best Albums of 2018	5	
The Triangle	The Best Albums of 2018	5	
Magnet	The Best Albums of 2018	2	
Billboard	The 20 Best Hip-Hop Albums of 2018	1	
Paste	The 10 Best Hip-Hop Albums of 2018	1	
Salon	Top 10 Albums of 2018 in Hip-Hop and R&B	2	
BBC	The Best Albums of 2018	8	
Highsnobiety	The 25 Best Albums of 2018	1	
Spectrum Culture	The Top 20 Albums of 2018	4	
AllHipHop	The 15 Best Hip-Hop Albums of 2018	1	
Vulture	The 15 Best Albums of 2018	5	
A. Side	The 25 Best Albums of 2018	4	
Rolling Stone	The 30 Best Hip-Hop Albums of 2018	3	
BrooklynVegan	The 30 Best Rap Albums of 2018	3	
NPR	The Best Rap Albums of 2018	9	
Consequence of Sound	The Top 50 Albums of 2018	5	
NME	The Albums of the Year 2018	5	
Rolling Stone	The 50 Best Albums of 2018	7	
Complex	The Best Albums of 2018	1	
Exclaim!	The Top 10 Hip-Hop Albums of 2018	2	
Revolt	The 11 Best Rap Albums of 2018	2	
The Ringer	The Best Albums of 2018	2	
Billboard	The 50 Best Albums of 2018	4	
The Daily Beast	The 50 Best Albums of 2018	3	
Loud and Quiet	The 40 Best Albums of 2018	2	
Now	The 10 Best Albums of 2018	4	

Awards
Ceremony	Category	Result	Ref.
61st Grammy Awards	Best Rap Album	Nominated	
GAFFA Awards	Best International Album	Nominated	

== Track listing ==
Daytona track listing
No.	Title	Writer(s)	Producer(s)	Length
1.	"If You Know You Know"	Terrence Thornton; Kanye West; Al Gwylit; Richard Nisbet	West	3:22
2.	"The Games We Play"	Thornton; West; Booker T. Averheart; Cynthia Biggs El; Shawn Carter; Dexter Wansel; David Anthony Willis	West; Andrew Dawson^{[a]}	2:46
3.	"Hard Piano" (featuring Rick Ross)	Thornton; West; Mike Dean; Antony Williams; Dawson; William Roberts; Charles Wright	West; Dawson^{[c]}; Dean^{[a]}	3:15
4.	"Come Back Baby"	Thornton; West; James T. Shaw	West; Dawson^{[a]}	3:26
5.	"Santeria"	Thornton; West; Dean; Williams; Danielle Balbuena; Isaac Hayes	West; Dean^{[c]}; Pi'erre Bourne^{[a]}	2:56
6.	"What Would Meek Do?" (featuring Kanye West)	Thornton; West; Jon Anderson; Christopher Squire; William Bruford	West	2:33
7.	"Infrared"	Thornton; West; Robert Manchurian; Carter; Mark James	West	2:50
Total length:				21:10

Notes

- ^{^[c]} signifies a co-producer
- ^{^[a]} signifies an additional producer

Samples

- "If You Know You Know" contains a sample of "12 O'Clock Satanial", written by Al Gwylit and Richard Nisbet, and performed by Air.
- "The Games We Play" contains a sample of "Heart 'n Soul", written and performed by Booker T. Averheart; and an interpolation of "Politics as Usual", written by Cynthia Biggs, Shawn Carter, Dexter Wansel and David Anthony Willis, and performed by Jay-Z.
- "Hard Piano" contains a sample of "High as Apple Pie – Slice II", written and performed by Charles Wright & the Watts 103rd Street Rhythm Band.
- "Come Back Baby" contains a sample of "The Truth Shall Make You Free", written and performed by the Mighty Hannibal, and an unauthorized sample of "I Can't Do Without You", written by George Jackson and Ronald Townsend, and performed by Jackson.
- "Santeria" contains a sample of "Bumpy's Lament", written by Isaac Hayes and performed by Soul Mann & the Brothers.
- "What Would Meek Do?" contains a sample of "Heart of the Sunrise", written by Jon Anderson, Christopher Squire and William Bruford, and performed by Yes.
- "Infrared" contains a sample of "I Want to Make Up", written by Robert Manchurian, and performed by 24-Carat Black; and an interpolation of "The Prelude", written by Shawn Carter and Mark James, and performed by Jay-Z.

== Personnel ==
- Tony Williams – additional vocals (track 3)
- 070 Shake – additional vocals (track 5)
- Tom Kahre – recording
- Nathaniel Alford – recording
- Jenna Felsenthal – recording assistance
- Mike Snell – recording for 070 Shake (track 5)
- Mike Dean – engineering, mixing, keyboards (tracks 3, 5), mastering
- Sean Solymar – assistant engineering
- Noah Goldstein – engineering, programming (tracks 1, 5)
- Andrew Dawson – engineering (tracks 2–4)
- Mike Malchicoff – engineering (tracks 3, 6)
- Jess Jackson – mixing
- Splash News – cover
- Akeem Smith (The Projects) – cover design

== Charts ==
=== Weekly charts ===
Weekly chart performance for Daytona
Chart (2018)	Peak position
Australian Albums (ARIA)	11
Belgian Albums (Ultratop Flanders)	22
Belgian Albums (Ultratop Wallonia)	155
Canadian Albums (Billboard)	5
Czech Albums (ČNS IFPI)	45
Danish Albums (Hitlisten)	18
Dutch Albums (Album Top 100)	18
French Albums (SNEP)	116
German Albums (Offizielle Top 100)	86
Irish Albums (IRMA)	17
New Zealand Albums (RMNZ)	12
Norwegian Albums (VG-lista)	12
Swedish Albums (Sverigetopplistan)	22
Swiss Albums (Schweizer Hitparade)	25
UK Albums (Official Charts)	13
UK R&B Albums (Official Charts)	2
US Billboard 200	2
US Top R&B/Hip-Hop Albums (Billboard)	2

=== Year-end charts ===
Year-end chart performance for Daytona
Chart (2018)	Position
US Top R&B/Hip-Hop Albums (Billboard)	87
