= It's Almost Dry =

Studio album by Pusha T
- Released: April 22, 2022
- Recorded: 2020–2022
- Length: 35:47
- Labels: GOOD; Def Jam
- Producers: 88-Keys; BoogzDaBeast; FnZ; Kanye West; Labrinth; Luca Starz; Pharrell Williams; Ojivolta; ThaMyind

Pusha T chronology
Daytona (2018)	It's Almost Dry (2022)	Let God Sort Em Out (2025)

Singles from It's Almost Dry
- 1. "Diet Coke" Released: February 8, 2022; 2. "Hear Me Clearly" Released: March 3, 2022; 3. "Neck & Wrist" Released: April 6, 2022; 4. "Scrape It Off" Released: May 10, 2022

It's Almost Dry is the fourth studio album by American rapper Pusha T. It was released on April 22, 2022 by GOOD Music and Def Jam Recordings, as his final album with both labels. Guest appearances include Kanye West, Jay-Z, Pharrell Williams, Kid Cudi, Lil Uzi Vert, Don Toliver, Nigo, Labrinth, and Malice. West and Williams also served as executive producers, with Williams producing six tracks, West producing five, and the pair producing one track together ("Rock N Roll"). The album also includes production from Labrinth, Ojivolta, FnZ, BoogzDaBeast, Luca Starz, and ThaMyind.

It's Almost Dry received widespread critical acclaim from music critics, with some comparing it to Pusha T's previous album, Daytona. It debuted at number one on the US Billboard 200 chart, earning 55,000 album-equivalent units in its first week.

== Background ==
On April 19, 2022, Pusha was interviewed by Rolling Stone, in which he explained the meaning of the album title, saying,

I'm always creating a masterpiece and in the creation of that in terms of a painting, you end up telling people while they waiting on it, 'It's almost dry,' because they're always asking, 'When will it be done?' And you have to wait on masterpieces. Also in drug culture, a lot of times you'll have people waiting on the product and it's not dry yet. You can come get it when it's dry.

== Release and promotion ==
On April 19, 2022, Pusha officially shared the album's cover art and revealed its tracklist. On April 22, 2022, the same day the album was released, Pusha appeared as a musical guest on The Tonight Show Starring Jimmy Fallon and held an album listening party in New York City, titled Cokechella. On January 24, 2022, he shared an image of American singer Lana Del Rey with her face seemingly obscured by a pile of cocaine. He later revealed that he posted the image with the belief that he and the singer talk about similar subjects in their music. According to Pusha, Del Rey's label contacted him shortly after, to request him getting on a remix. The day before the image was posted, Pusha had previewed new music in Paris, with several snippets showing up on various celebrities Instagram stories. On January 28, 2022, Pusha shared a post on Instagram of a contract indicating him signing off on Def Jam Recordings, writing that "some people call you their brother, other people show you you're brothers". In the post, he also expressed his gratitude to fellow American rapper and one of the producers involved in the album, Kanye West, with saying "Thanx Yezos", a play on the name of Amazon founder Jeff Bezos, a moniker also used to reference West in the lyrics of certain songs on the album. Pusha's manager, Steven Victor, confirmed that It's Almost Dry was set to be his last album under the Def Jam label and that he now owns his masters because of West. On April 18, 2022, Pusha announced that a public listening party would be held in New York that same week. Later that day, he officially announced the album's release date while sharing a snippet from the then-unreleased song "I Pray for You." The album ended up leaking on the same day, four days before its official release.

=== Singles ===
The album's lead single, "Diet Coke", was released on February 8, 2022. The next single, "Hear Me Clearly", a collaboration with Japanese fashion designer and record producer Nigo, was released on March 4, 2022. The third single, "Neck & Wrist," which features American rapper Jay-Z and American singer-songwriter and record producer Pharrell Williams, was released on April 6, 2022. The fourth single, "Scrape It Off," which features American rapper Lil Uzi Vert and American rapper and singer Don Toliver, was sent to urban contemporary radio on May 10, 2022.

== Critical reception ==
Professional ratings
Aggregate scores
Source	Rating
AnyDecentMusic?	7.9/10
Metacritic	83/100
Review scores
Source	Rating
AllMusic	4/5 stars
Clash	8/10
HipHopDX	3.8/5
The Line of Best Fit	8/10
NME	5/5 stars
Pitchfork	7.8/10
Rolling Stone	4/5 stars
Slant Magazine	4/5 stars

It's Almost Dry received widespread critical acclaim. According to Metacritic, which assigns a normalized rating out of 100 to reviews from mainstream publications, the album received an average score of 83 based on 15 reviews. Marcuss Shorter of Consequence wrote that the album "drips confidence from knowing Pusha is one of a few artists who can do what he does at a very high level" and called it "the perfect complement to Daytona, creating Pusha's very own gangster saga on wax".

AllMusic wrote that "with fourth solo album It's Almost Dry, Pusha T does what he does best -- deliver larger than life storytelling rhymes about drug dealing and street struggles -- only bigger, better, and more polished to perfection than before" and "upgrading significantly from 2018's brief and scattered-feeling Daytona, It's Almost Dry finds Pusha T in the role of the cool, collected, bulletproof rapper".

== Commercial performance ==
It's Almost Dry debuted at number one on the US Billboard 200 chart, earning 55,000 album-equivalent units (including 9,000 copies in pure album sales) in its first week. This became Pusha's first and so far only number-one album. The album also accumulated a total of 59.11 million on-demand streams of the album's songs.

== Track listing ==
It's Almost Dry track listing
No.	Title	Writer(s)	Producer(s)	Length
1.	"Brambleton"	Terrence Thornton; Pharrell Williams	P. Williams	2:50
2.	"Let the Smokers Shine the Coupes"	T. Thornton; P. Williams; Mark Williams; Raul Cubina	P. Williams; Ojivolta	2:30
3.	"Dreamin of the Past" (featuring Kanye West)	T. Thornton; Kanye West; John Lennon	West	2:53
4.	"Neck & Wrist" (featuring Jay-Z and Pharrell Williams)	T. Thornton; Shawn Carter; P. Williams	P. Williams	3:29
5.	"Just So You Remember"	T. Thornton; Michael Mule; Isaac De Boni; West; Jahmal Gwin; Brian Farrell	FnZ; West; BoogzDaBeast	2:58
6.	"Diet Coke"	T. Thornton; West; Charles Njapa; Joseph Cartagena; Jerry Butler	West; 88-Keys	3:00
7.	"Rock N Roll" (featuring Kanye West and Kid Cudi)	T. Thornton; West; Scott Mescudi; Beyoncé Knowles-Carter; Terius Nash; Christopher Stewart; P. Williams; M. Williams; Cubina	West; P. Williams; Ojivolta	3:53
8.	"Call My Bluff"	T. Thornton; P. Williams	P. Williams	2:48
9.	"Scrape It Off" (featuring Lil Uzi Vert and Don Toliver)	T. Thornton; Symere Woods; Caleb Toliver; P. Williams	P. Williams	2:32
10.	"Hear Me Clearly" (with Nigo)	T. Thornton; West; Jahmal Gwin; Luca Starz; Lawrence Berment; William Roberts II; Shawn Carter; Leigh Elliott; John Stephens; Johnny Mollings; Leonardo Mollings; Rennard East	West; Nigo; BoogzDaBeast; Starz; ThaMyind	2:21
11.	"Open Air"	T. Thornton; P. Williams	P. Williams	2:12
12.	"I Pray for You" (featuring Labrinth and Malice)	T. Thornton; Timothy McKenzie; Gene Thornton Jr.; West	Labrinth; West	4:21
Total length:				35:47

Notes

- Two alternate configurations of the track listing were released three days after the original: on the first configuration, It's Almost Dry: Ye vs. Pharrell, West's six produced tracks were moved to the start and Williams' six produced songs moved to the end of the track listing. The inverse occurred on the second configuration, titled It's Almost Dry: Pharrell vs. Ye.
- Digital versions co-credit Clipse (Pusha T and Malice together) on "I Pray for You".

Sample credits

- "Dreamin of the Past" contains samples from "Jealous Guy", written by John Lennon, as performed by Donny Hathaway.
- "Diet Coke" contains samples from "Take the Time to Tell Her", written by Jerry Butler and Marvin Yancy, as performed by Jerry Butler, and samples from a Verzuz Battle by Fat Joe.
- "Just So You Remember" contains samples from "Six Days War", written by Brian Farell and performed by Colonel Bagshot.
- "Rock n Roll" contains a sample from "1+1", written by Beyoncé Knowles-Carter, Terius Nash, and Christopher Stewart, as performed by Beyoncé.

== Personnel ==
Musicians

- Mike Larson – programming (2, 4, 8–9)
- Ojivolta – programming (2)
- Shelly Berg – programming (2)
- Budapest Scoring Choir – choir (2)
- Fat Joe – additional vocals (sampled) (6)
- 88-Keys – programming (6)
- Christina Nicholas – additional vocals (8)
- Kanye West – programming (10)
- BoogzDaBeast – programming (10)
- Luca Starz – programming (10)
- ThaMyind – programming (10)

Technical

- Manny Marroquin – mixing (1–5, 8–11)
- Emerson Mancini – mastering (1–5, 7–12)
- Mike Dean – mixing (6–7, 12), mastering (6)
- Anthony Vilchis – mix assistance (1–5, 8–11)
- Trey Station – mix assistance (1–5, 8–11)
- Zach Pereyra – mix assistance (1–5, 8–11)
- Sean Solymar – mix assistance (6–7, 12)
- Tommy Rush – mix assistance (7, 12)
- Fabian Marasciullo – immersive mixing (10)
- Mike Larson – recording (1–2, 4–5, 7–12)
- Andrew Coleman – recording (3)
- Nathaniel Alford – recording (3, 5)
- Gimel "Young Guru" Keaton – recording (4)
- Robert Ulsh – recording (3, 6–7, 9, 12)
- Andrés Osorio – recording (7)
- William J. Sullivan – recording (7)
- Benjamin Thomas – recording (9)
- Derek Anderson – recording (9)
- Nick Valentine – recording (10)
- Morgan David – recording assistance (1–2, 4, 9–10, 12)
- Noah Hashimoto – recording assistance (3)
- Ben Sedano – recording assistance (9)
- Josh Haddad – recording assistance (9)
- Mikalai Skrobat – recording assistance (9)
- Maximilian "Vandal" Deak – recording assistance (10)
- Bálint Sapszon – vocal production (2)
- Dénes Rédly – vocal engineer (2)

Design

- Kanye West – art direction
- Sterling Ruby – cover design

== Charts ==
=== Weekly charts ===
Weekly chart performance for It's Almost Dry
Chart (2022)	Peak position
Australian Albums (ARIA)	11
Austrian Albums (Ö3 Austria)	21
Belgian Albums (Ultratop Flanders)	23
Belgian Albums (Ultratop Wallonia)	94
Canadian Albums (Billboard)	1
Danish Albums (Hitlisten)	16
Dutch Albums (Album Top 100)	19
Finnish Albums (Suomen virallinen lista)	25
French Albums (SNEP)	86
German Albums (Offizielle Top 100)	37
Irish Albums (Official Charts)	11
Italian Albums (FIMI)	82
Lithuanian Albums (AGATA)	30
New Zealand Albums (RMNZ)	6
Norwegian Albums (VG-lista)	10
Scottish Albums (Official Charts)	84
Spanish Albums (Promusicae)	96
Swedish Albums (Sverigetopplistan)	31
Swiss Albums (Schweizer Hitparade)	15
UK Albums (Official Charts)	7
UK R&B Albums (Official Charts)	4
US Billboard 200	1
US Top R&B/Hip-Hop Albums (Billboard)	1

=== Year-end charts ===
Year-end chart performance for It's Almost Dry
Chart (2022)	Position
US Top R&B/Hip-Hop Albums (Billboard)	94
