= Diet Coke (song) =

2022 single by Pusha T

Single by Pusha T

from the album It's Almost Dry
- Released: February 8, 2022
- Genre: Hip hop
- Length: 2:59
- Label: GOOD; Def Jam
- Songwriters: Terrence Thornton; Kanye West; Charles Njapa; Jerry Butler; Joseph Cartagena; Marvin Yancy
- Producers: Kanye West; 88-Keys

Pusha T singles chronology
"Dancing with the Devil" (2022)	"Diet Coke" (2022)	"Hear Me Clearly" (2022)

Music video
- "Diet Coke" on YouTube

"Diet Coke" is a song by American rapper Pusha T. It was released on February 8, 2022 as the lead single from his fourth studio album It's Almost Dry (2022). Produced by Kanye West and 88-Keys, the song references cocaine and drug dealing.

== Background ==
On February 7, 2022, 88-Keys revealed that he produced the instrumental of the song in 2004 as an interlude for his beat tape, The Makings of Crack-Cocaine.

The cover art of the single was designed by Sterling Ruby. It shows a "mash-up of melting faces with crude metallic letters" spelling "Diet Coke".

== Composition and lyrics ==
The song begins with a sample of rapper Fat Joe yelling, "Yesterday's price is not today's price". Over a piano-driven boom bap beat, Pusha T raps about selling cocaine and references his tough upbringing: "Imaginary players ain't been coached right / Master recipes under stove lights / The number on this jersey is the quote price / You ordered Diet Coke, that's a joke, right?" He declares his appreciation for Kanye West as well ("Far as I'm concerned, who's the best? Me and Yezos").

== Reception ==
Complex writers Eric Skelton, Andre Gee and Jessica McKinney positively reviewed the song. Skelton and McKinney praised the beat, while Gee praised how Pusha T raps only about one topic and can "still come off sounding fresh". All three writers also expressed approval toward how Pusha does not diss rapper Drake in the song.

Commercially, "Diet Coke" debuted on the US Hot R&B/Hip-Hop Songs and Bubbling Under Hot 100 chart on the week of February 26, 2022. It later returned with peak positions of number 43 and number four on the week of May 7, respectively. Internationally, the song peaked at number 88 on the South Africa Streaming chart and number 93 on the Canadian Hot 100.

== Music video ==
The music video was released on February 8, 2022. It was shot in black-and-white and directed by Omar Jones. It sees Pusha T rapping as Kanye West dances in the white background, and reclining on a sofa.

== Live performances ==
Pusha T first unveiled the song during a performance at Nigo's Kenzo Paris Fashion Week show in January 2022. In March 2022, he performed the song at The Late Show with Stephen Colbert.

== Remixes ==
American rappers Jim Jones and Fabolous released a freestyle of the song on February 16, 2022.

== Charts ==
Chart performance for "Diet Coke"
Chart (2022)	Peak position
Canada Hot 100 (Billboard)	93
South Africa Streaming (TOSAC)	88
US Bubbling Under Hot 100 (Billboard)	4
US Hot R&B/Hip-Hop Songs (Billboard)	43
