= Chad Hugo production discography =

The following list is the discography of recordings with production by Chad Hugo. For songs produced by The Neptunes, a production duo of which he is a member, see The Neptunes production discography.

== 1995 ==
=== Average Guyz - First Come First Served ===
- 7. "Ride"

== 1997 ==
=== Taral Hicks - This Time ===
- 3. "How Can I Get Over You"

== 2003 ==
=== Kenna - New Sacred Cow ===
(All tracks produced with Kenna)

- 1. "Within Earshot"
- 2. "Freetime"
- 3. "Man Fading"
- 4. "Sunday After You"
- 5. "Vexed and Glorious / A Better Control"
- 6. "Red Man"
- 7. "Hell Bent"
- 10. "New Sacred Cow"
- 11. "I'm Gone"
- 12. "Siren"
- 13. "Love/Hate Sensation"

== 2005 ==
=== Jesse McCartney - She's No You (Remix) ===
- 1. "She's No You" (Remix featuring Fabolous)
- 2. "She's No You" (Remix)

== 2007 ==
=== Kenna - The Black Goodbye EP ===
- All tracks (produced with Kenna)

=== Kenna - Make Sure They See My Face ===
(All tracks produced with Kenna)

- 1. "Daylight"
- 2. "Out of Control (State of Emotion)"
- 5. "Sun Red Sky Blue"
- 6. "Baptized in Blacklight"
- 8. "Phantom Always" (featuring Justin Timberlake) (produced with Justin Timberlake)
- 9. "Face the Gun / Good Luck"
- 10. "Better Wise Up"
- 12. "Wide Awake"

=== Kings of Leon - Charmer ===
- 2. "My Party" (Chad Hugo & Kenna remix) (produced with Kenna)

== 2008 ==
=== Ashlee Simpson - Bittersweet World ===
(All tracks produced with Kenna)

- 2. "Boys" (produced with Jack Joseph Puig)
- 4. "No Time for Tears"
- 9. "Hot Stuff"
- 12. "Follow You Wherever You Go"

=== Kevin Rudolf - In the City ===
- 10. "She Can Get It" (produced with Kevin Rudolf)

=== Sierra Swan - Queen of the Valley ===
- 4. "Sex Is Keeping Us Together"
- 5. "Nuclear Letdown"

== 2010 ==
=== All-American Rejects - Move Along (Chad Hugo remix) ===
- 1. "Move Along" (Chad Hugo remix)

=== JoJo - Can't Take That Away from Me ===
- 3. "Pretty Please" (produced with Kenna)

=== Kenna - Download to Donate for Haiti ===
- 3. "Never Let Me Down" (produced with Mike Shinoda)

== 2011 ==
=== E-40 - Revenue Retrievin': Overtime Shift ===
- 7. "Beastin'"

=== Kenna - Land 2 Air Chronicles I: Chaos and the Darkness ===
- All tracks (produced with Kenna)

== 2012 ==
=== Stalley - Savage Journey To The American Dream ===
- 9. "Everything New"

== 2013 ==
=== Kenna - Land 2 Air Chronicles II: Imitation Is Suicide Chapter 1 ===
- All tracks (produced with Kenna)

=== Yuna - Nocturnal ===
- 6. "Someone Who Can"

=== No Malice - Hear Ye Him ===
- 17. "No Time"

=== The Internet - Feel Good ===
- 3. "Dontcha" (produced with The Internet and Mike Einziger)

=== MSSL CMMND - Why Fight The Space Age ===
- 1. Moog (Intro)
- 2. Heartbreakers feat. Graph Gonzales (Demo)
- 3. Say It’s Okay feat. Lil’ Wayne (Demo)
- 4. Cee-Lo Green – Bridges (MSSL CMMND Remix)
- 5. Moog (Interlude)
- 6. Hope & Prey (Ghetto Panda)
- 7. Chad Hugo & Danny Zook – I Like It That Way
- 8. Tuezday Morning Whiskey – Whizkey Song
- 9. No Planes In Space – No Planes (Interlude)
- 10 No Planes In Space – Why Fight The Space Age (Potholes De Createur Uniden) (2nd Version) (Chad Hugo Remix)
- 11. The Oh Hello’s – Hello My Old Heart (MSSL CMMND Remix)
- 12. MSSL CMMND – Commercial (Interlude)
- 13. Chinky Bean – Roll Off The Face
- 14. J Pharoah & Gabe Niles – Gelato
- 15. Quazr – She Throws The Beat Down
- 16. Cold Weather (Interlude)
- 17. Chad Hugo – Strolling To The Seaside (MSSL CMMND Freestyle Mix)
- 18. The Spark feat. Oak & Trackademics.
- 19. J Pharoah – Pharoah From The Beach
- 20. Jake Break – Inevitable feat. Stacie (Rekapse)
- 21. Workout Plan (Interlude)
- 22. Micah Javier – Joy Joy Joy (MSSL CMMND Remix)
- 23. Outro

== 2014 ==
=== Kid Sister - Kid Sister's DUSK2DAWN: The Diary Of Jane Jupiter ===
- 11. "Higher"
- 13. "Higher (Sex Edit)"

=== Little Dragon - Killing Me (Chad Hugo Remix) ===
- 1. Killing Me "(Chad Hugo Remix)"

=== St. Vincent - Digital Witness (Chad Hugo Remix) ===
- 1. Digital Witness "(Chad Hugo Remix)"

== 2015 ==
=== Snoop Dogg - Bush ===
(All tracks produced with Pharrell Williams)

- 1. California Roll (featuring Stevie Wonder)
- 2. This City
- 3. R U a Freak
- 4. Awake
- 5. So Many Pros
- 7. Edibles (featuring T.I.)
- 8. I Knew That
- 9. Runaway (featuring Gwen Stefani)
- 10. I'm Ya Dogg (featuring Kendrick Lamar and Rick Ross)

=== Various Artists - Manny OST ===
- 1. SB – All My People
- 2. Far East Movement – Mobbin’
- 3. apl.de.ap – Get Back Up
- 4. Kris Lawrence & JNaturaL – Champion
- 5. Iamsu! & P-Lo – Can’t Stop, Won’t Stop
- 6. Cameron Rafati – Face Your Destiny (Manny Pacquiao Theme)
- 7. Chad Hugo & Yardnoise – Titanic March (De La Hoya Theme)
- 8. Chad Hugo & Yardnoise – Majestic (Bob Arum Theme)
- 9. Chad Hugo & Yardnoise – Unabashed (Michael Koncz Theme)
- 10. Chad Hugo – Media Day
- 11. Christian Rich – Come & Love Me feat. Pharrell (Christian Rich)
- 12. Cameron Rafati – Face Your Destiny (Manny Pacquiao Theme) (Remix)

== 2016 ==
=== Fugitive 9 - Vision Alpha ===
- 8. "Landmines"

=== SG Lewis - Yours (EP) ===
- 3. "Meant to Be" (produced with SG Lewis)

== 2017 ==
=== Jallal - Off the Radar ===
- 13. "Toss & Turn" (feat. Ne-Yo) (produced with Elliot James and Jan Fairchild)

== 2018 ==
=== Sierra Swan - Caterwaul ===
- 1. "Caterwaul"
- 2. "Duel Of The FareWillMeNots"
- 3. "Purple Forever"
- 4. "Rusted Girl"
- 5. "System Breaker"

== 2019 ==
=== Aaron Carpenter - Attitude (Single) ===
- 1. "Attitude" (produced with SG Lewis)

=== Laundry Day - Light up Shoes 2 (EP) ===
- 1. "CRÈME"

== 2020 ==
=== Bryce Vine - Baby Girl (Single) ===
- 1. Baby Girl (produced with Sir Nolan and Simon Says)

== 2021 ==
=== SG Lewis - Times ===
- 7. "Chemicals" (produced with SG Lewis and Julian Bunetta)

=== Brockhampton - Roadrunner: New Light, New Machine ===
- 10. "When I Ball" (produced with Baird and Goldwash)

=== Col3trane - 2AM ===
- 1. "2AM" (produced with Lido)

=== Rakeem Miles - It Is What It Is ===
- 1. "It Is What It Is"

== 2022 ==
=== Eyedress - In the Dog House ===
- 2. "Dream Dealer"

=== Hudson Mohawke - Cry Sugar ===
- 11. "Redeem" (produced with Hudson Mohawke)

=== Keith Ape - Ape Into Space ===
- 1. "Mull"

== 2023 ==
=== Phoenix - All Eyes On Me (feat. Benee, Chad Hugo & Pusha T) ===
- 1. "All Eyes On Me (ft. Benee, Chad Hugo & Pusha T)"

=== Phoenix - All Eyes On Me (Remixes) ===
- 1. "All Eyes On Me (feat. Benee & Pusha T) - Chad Hugo's Le Yaca Version"
- 2. "All Eyes On Me (feat. Benee & Pusha T) - Chad Hugo Remix"

=== Wiz Khalifa - Good Burger 2 (Original Motion Picture Soundtrack) ===
- 2. "No Fair"

(Produced with Lex Luger)

== 2024 ==
=== ¥$ (Kanye West and Ty Dolla Sign) - Vultures 1 ===
- 15. "Problematic" (Produced with Ye, Ty Dolla Sign, 88-Keys and Camper)

=== Eyedress - A Vampire in Beverley Hills ===
- 30. OFW (feat. Vex Ruffin)

== 2025 ==
=== Eyedress - Stoner ===
- 3. "The Big City" (feat. Chad Hugo)

== 2026 ==
=== Brent Faiyaz - Icon ===
- 7. "World Is Yours"

(Produced with Brent Faiyaz and Dpat)

=== Chad Hugo - Jumpupw!nya ===
- 1. "Jumpupw!nya"

=== Rochelle Jordan - Never Enough (Remix) ===
- 1. Never Enough (Remix)
