= Frontin' =

2003 single by Pharrell Williams featuring Jay-Z

Single by Pharrell Williams featuring Jay-Z

from the album The Neptunes Present... Clones
- Released: June 3, 2003
- Genre: R&B; hip-hop
- Length: 4:01
- Label: Star Trak; Arista
- Songwriters: Pharrell Williams; Chad Hugo; Shawn Carter
- Producer: The Neptunes

Pharrell Williams singles chronology
"Belly Dancer" (2003)	"Frontin'" (2003)	"Light Your Ass on Fire" (2003)

Jay-Z singles chronology
"La-La-La" (2003)	"Frontin'" (2003)	"Change Clothes" (2003)

Music video
- "Frontin'" on YouTube

"Frontin'" is the debut single by American musician Pharrell Williams featuring American rapper Jay-Z. It was written by the artists alongside Chad Hugo, who produced it with Williams as the Neptunes. At the time of its release, Williams insisted the single was a one-off, and that he was purely a producer and not an artist in his own right. However, he released his own solo studio album, In My Mind, in 2006.

The song's title refers to putting up a facade (or false front), typically to impress peers. The drum beat was heavily influenced by the Beatles' 1965 track "In My Life", and the bass during the bridge by Stevie Wonder. Pharrell had initially written the song for Prince. It was the 34th best-selling song of 2003 in the U.S., according to Billboard magazine. It was also featured on the Neptunes' 2003 compilation album The Neptunes Present... Clones, which debuted at number one on the Billboard 200 in August 2003. In 2024, the song appeared on Williams' soundtrack album Piece by Piece (Original Motion Picture Soundtrack).

== Music video ==
The music video was filmed in Miami, Florida. Two women approach a mansion, which is throwing a large party. The women knock on the door to attend the party, and one of the women (actress Lauren London), asks for Pharrell. The security guard at the door "doesn't know who they are talking about" and will not let them inside. The other girl, who is her friend (The Price Is Right game show model LaNisha Cole), tells the security guard "Neptunes Presents Clones", and they are allowed into the party. Once the girls are inside, Pharrell is immediately smitten towards both women throughout the video, and scenes of the party guests having fun are shown, with Jay-Z also in attendance.

== Chart performance ==
"Frontin'" peaked at number five on the Billboard Hot 100. It also peaked at number one on the Hot R&B/Hip-Hop Songs. In the UK, "Frontin'" remained Pharrell's highest-charting single as a lead artist until "Happy" reached number one in 2013.

== Track listing ==
- UK CD single
1. "Frontin'" (featuring Jay-Z) (radio edit)
2. "Hot Damn" (featuring Ab Liva)
3. "Popular Thug" (Kelis featuring Nas)
4. "Frontin'" (video)

== Charts ==
=== Weekly charts ===
Chart (2003)	Peak position
Australia (ARIA)	28
Australian Urban (ARIA)	11
Belgium (Ultratop 50 Wallonia)	33
Belgium (Ultratip Bubbling Under Flanders)	6
Canada (Nielsen SoundScan)	15
Denmark (Tracklisten)	12
Germany (GfK)	61
Ireland (IRMA)	16
Netherlands (Dutch Top 40)	24
Netherlands (Single Top 100)	21
Scottish Singles Sales (Official Charts)	10
Sweden (Sverigetopplistan)	49
Switzerland (Schweizer Hitparade)	23
UK Singles (Official Charts)	6
UK Hip Hop/R&B (Official Charts)	2
US Billboard Hot 100	5
US Hot R&B/Hip-Hop Songs (Billboard)	1
US Pop Airplay (Billboard)	29
US Rhythmic Airplay (Billboard)	6

=== Year-end charts ===
Chart (2003)	Position
UK Singles (OCC)	87
UK Urban (Music Week)	4
US Billboard Hot 100	34

== Certifications ==
Region	Certification	Certified units/sales
New Zealand (RMNZ)	Platinum	30,000^{‡}
United Kingdom (BPI)	Gold	400,000^{‡}
^{‡} Sales+streaming figures based on certification alone.

== Other versions ==
On February 11, 2004, the track was covered by British neo-jazz artist Jamie Cullum for BBC Radio 1's Live Lounge. Williams was very impressed by the cover after it was played to him on a visit to the show, and this led to Cullum providing backup vocals for "You Can Do It Too", a track on Pharrell's first solo album In My Mind. The cover appeared as a bonus track on the American release of Cullum's album Twentysomething. Cullum's version was released as a single and reached number 12 in the UK.

"Frontin'" was also covered live by Maroon 5, featuring Chad Hugo and rapper Mos Def, who replaced Jay-Z's verse with impromptu rapping from A Tribe Called Quest's "Bonita Applebum", in an apparent reference to similarities between parts of the tracks. New Orleans native Trombone Shorty and his band and Orleans Avenue covered the song on their 2005 debut album, Orleans & Claiborne. During the 2012 International Yardfest at Howard University, American singer Leah LaBelle performed her 2012 single "Sexify" as part of a medley with "Frontin'". In 2014, UK garage group Disclosure remixed the song.

American rapper GoldLink also performed a live cover of the song on Like a Version.
