= Grindin' =

Single by Clipse

from the album Lord Willin'
- Released: 2002
- Recorded: 2001
- Genre: East Coast hip-hop
- Length: 4:24
- Label: Arista; Star Trak
- Songwriters: Gene Thornton; Terrence Thornton; Pharrell Williams; Charles Hugo
- Producer: The Neptunes

Clipse singles chronology
"The Funeral" (1999)	"Grindin'" (2002)	"When the Last Time" (2002)

"Grindin'" is a song by the American hip-hop duo Clipse. Co-written with and produced by the Neptunes, it was released as the lead single from Clipse's debut studio album, Lord Willin' (2002), through Arista Records and Star Trak Entertainment. The track's beat was first conceived by Neptunes member Pharrell Williams after Pusha T of Clipse provoked him into making it, with the former giving the duo a strict deadline to come to his studio before he gave it to a different rapper. Musically, the song features a minimalist instrumental with slight synthesizers, over which Clipse use wordplay to rap about selling crack cocaine.

"Grindin'" received acclaim from music critics for its production and became a Top 40 hit, peaking at number 30 on the US Billboard Hot 100 in August 2002. It is credited with pioneering coke rap, a subgenre of gangsta rap centered on lyrics regarding the selling of cocaine, though Pusha did not originally identify with the label. Several publications have since named it one of the best songs of the 2000s, with Rolling Stone listing it as one of the best ever made.

== Background and recording ==
American hip-hop duo Clipse worked extensively with American production duo the Neptunes starting in 1994, when Neptunes member Pharrell Williams suggested that rappers Malice and Pusha T form a duo together during a recording session. Malice had first worked with Chad Hugo of the Neptunes in 1988 when they were connected by a mutual friend, and Hugo later introduced him to Williams in 1990. The production duo would begin working on Clipse's upcoming debut album Exclusive Audio Footage in 1999 after the rappers signed to Elektra Records, and was their first time professionally recording together, although the album was later shelved after Elektra dropped Clipse because of creative differences. The rappers returned back to drug dealing when they left the label, which is when they began working on "Grindin'".

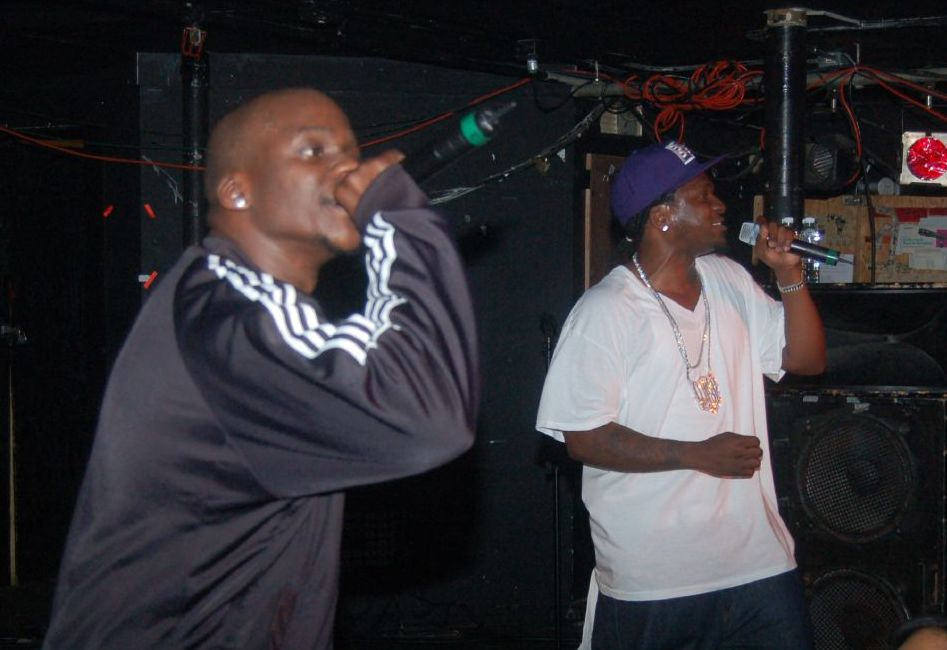
Clipse in 2007

According to Pusha, the beat to "Grindin'" was made by provoking Williams into producing it, telling him that he had not yet made any "crucial" tracks. After suggesting that Williams had been "going to the movies too much", the producer started "yelling [and] screaming" before kicking the duo out of his recording studio. Hours later, Williams called Pusha, telling him that he had "heat" for Clipse, but would give it away to American rapper Jay-Z if the two did not come to the studio in the next seven minutes. Clipse arrived soon after, where they were shown the beat to "Grindin'".

The duo were initially confused by the beat, with Malice telling Williams that something was "missing" from it. Hugo reflected that he wanted it to be stripped-back with "[j]ust a break[beat] and a rapper", which he felt recalled the early days of hip-hop. Pusha wrote two or three different verses before settling on the final one, stating in an interview with Complex: "The other verses [I wrote] were good, but they weren't in pocket. And I was like, 'Man, this isn't really like a mixtape verse, you can't mixtape verse this.'" Malice wrote for the track twice, though Pusha claimed that he was "immediately" able to flow on it.

== Composition and lyrics ==
"Grindin'" was produced by Williams alongside Hugo as part of the Neptunes, and features a simple, sparse beat with programmed drums, woodblocks, and minimal synthesizers. It prominently uses a "slamming" percussive sound originally created by sound designer John "Skippy" Lehmkuhl for the Korg Triton synthesizer, found in the "B116 Percussion Kit" sound bank under the name "Tribe". Lehmkuhl made the sound using a sample from a recording session with Japanese Taiko drummers and added vocal accents from himself and fellow designer Jack Hotop. The final "Tribe" had to be trimmed from its "much longer" length to fit on the Korg Triton's digital memory chip.

"Grindin'" opens with an introduction by Williams, who states: "Yo, I go by the name of Pharrell, from the Neptunes, and I just wanna let y'all know the world is about to feel something that they've never felt before." From there, the lyrical focus of the track is drug dealing, as Clipse uses wordplay and one-liners to rap about selling crack cocaine. Pusha opens his verse by rapping that he sells cocaine "[f]rom ghetto to ghetto, to backyard to yard," and asserts that he is the listener's "personal pusher", (Note: Not a direct lyric quote.) comparing himself to a subwoofer loudspeaker due to the "base" he "pump[s]". He further compares himself to American streetball player Pee Wee Kirkland, who had done time for alleged drug distribution. In the third verse, Malice references 4.5 ounces of cocaine being considered major weight when dealing, considering anything less to be "a goddamn shame".

== Promotion and release ==
"Grindin'" was released as the lead single to Clipse's debut studio album, Lord Willin' (2002), in 2002, through Arista Records and Star Trak Entertainment. It was their third single overall, following the 1990s singles "Dealin'" and "The Funeral"; the latter was released under Elektra before they dropped the duo. To promote the single, 1000 promotional copies were distributed to various radio stations and DJs, but the majority of them disliked the song; one DJ stated they would only give it airplay if they could remix it. Clipse helped promote the track by personally performing it for drug dealers across the United States, usually earning around US$1,500-3000 per show in the process.

"Grindin'" began receiving consistent radio airplay in the months following its release, most of which was not paid for by Arista. L.A. Reid, then-CEO of the label, expressed that he was unsatisfied with the single's commercial performance by allegedly threatening to fire staff if they did not start promoting it. The combination of airplay, more consistent promotion, and Clipse's live performances helped the single reach the Top 40 of the Billboard Hot 100, peaking at number 30 in August 2002. It additionally charted on the Hot R&B/Hip-Hop Songs, Hot Rap Songs, and Rhythmic Airplay charts, peaking at numbers 10, 8, and 37 respectively.

== Critical reception and legacy ==
"Grindin'" received acclaim from music critics, mainly for its instrumental. Kris Ex of Blender praised the beat as the best production by the Neptunes since "Hot in Here" (2002) by Nelly, describing the overall track as "big-beat [sic] madness that goes unchecked". The Boston Phoenix's Michael Endelman noted it as a "standout track" from Lord Willin' that recalled "Sucker M.C.'s" (1983) by Run-DMC, but criticized Clipse as "boring" rappers. Critic Robert Christgau later opined that the duo's exploitation of "the familiar hip hop trope in which rappers aren't really rappers, but hustlers" helped it achieve success and reintroduce cocaine-centered lyrics to commercial hip-hop, though said they failed to follow it up, attributing this to the several delays of their second studio album, Hell Hath No Fury (2006).

Several publications have ranked "Grindin'" as one of the best songs of its decade. Pitchfork ranked it at number 27 on such a list, with writer Nate Patrin praising Clipse's "ingeniously cold wordplay" and the Neptunes's production. Rolling Stone included it at number 84 on a similar list, and later ranked it as the 281st best song of all time in a list of 500.

The style of rap used in "Grindin'" would be retroactively categorized as "coke rap", which hip-hop writer Shea Serrano later argued was pioneered by Clipse and an evolution of gangsta rap that became the dominant style. He described Clipse's attitude as "reverse charisma", referring to how they kept the "true chaos" other gangsta rappers had substitued for charisma, and felt they removed any romanticization from drug dealing. Pusha was apathetic to the label of coke rap during its coining, telling the Los Angeles Times that "I don't think it’s fair to just label us as coke rap. There's literature in our verses", though he has since used it to describe "Grindin'". Other rappers who heavily featured cocaine in their lyrics, such as Ghostface Killah and Gucci Mane, were also referred to as "coke rappers".

== Charts ==
=== Weekly charts ===
Chart (2002)	Peak position
US Billboard Hot 100	30
US Hot R&B/Hip-Hop Songs (Billboard)	10
US Hot Rap Songs (Billboard)	8
US Rhythmic Airplay (Billboard)	37

=== Year-end charts ===
Chart (2002)	Position
US Hot R&B/Hip-Hop Songs (Billboard)	46
