= Wamp Wamp (What It Do) =

Single by Clipse featuring Slim Thug

from the album Hell Hath No Fury
- Released: October 31, 2006
- Recorded: November 2005
- Genre: Hip-hop
- Length: 4:00
- Label: Star Trak; Re-Up; Jive
- Songwriter(s): Gene Thornton; Terrence Thornton; Stayve Thomas; Pharrell Williams
- Producer(s): The Neptunes

Clipse singles chronology
"Mr. Me Too" (2006)	"Wamp Wamp (What It Do)" (2006)	"Set It Off" (2008)

Slim Thug singles chronology
"Check on It" (2005)	"Wamp Wamp (What It Do)" (2006)	"Wood Grain Wheel" (2007)

"Wamp Wamp (What It Do)" is the second single from the 2006 Clipse album Hell Hath No Fury. The song features Slim Thug and was produced by The Neptunes.

It was the Unleashed video on MTV2 on October 30, 2006, and was the "New Joint" of the day on 106 & Park on November 3, 2006.

Chamillionaire and Pharrell make cameo appearances in the music video.

It has been remixed with Grizzly Bear's "Knife" by Girl Talk.

== Charts ==
Chart (2006)	Peak position
US Hot R&B/Hip-Hop Songs (Billboard)	96
