= Ma, I Don't Love Her =

Single by Clipse featuring Faith Evans

from the album Lord Willin'
- Released: December 3, 2002
- Recorded: 2002
- Genre: Hip-hop; R&B
- Length: 4:17
- Label: Arista; Star Trak
- Songwriters: Gene Thornton; Terrence Thornton; Faith Evans; Pharrell Williams; Charles Hugo
- Producer: The Neptunes

Clipse singles chronology
"When the Last Time" (2002)	"Ma, I Don't Love Her" (2002)	"Hot Damn" (2003)

Faith Evans singles chronology
"Relax Your Mind" (2002)	"Ma, I Don't Love Her" (2002)	"Someday" (2003)

"Ma, I Don't Love Her" is the third official single from the Clipse off their album Lord Willin'. It features Faith Evans and was produced by The Neptunes. The single was released through Arista Records and Star Trak Entertainment.

In 2003 "Ma, I Don't Love Her" peaked at number 86 on the Billboard Hot 100 and number 40 on the Hot R&B/Hip-Hop Singles & Tracks charts.

== Charts ==
Chart (2003)	Peak position
UK Singles (OCC)	38
US Billboard Hot 100	86
US Hot R&B/Hip-Hop Songs (Billboard)	40

== Release history ==
Region	Date	Format(s)	Label(s)	Ref.
United States	December 9, 2002	Rhythmic contemporary · urban contemporary radio	Star Trak, Arista	
