= Light Your Ass on Fire =

2003 single by Busta Rhymes featuring Pharrell Williams

Single by Busta Rhymes featuring Pharrell Williams

from the album The Neptunes Present... Clones
- Released: July 22, 2003
- Genre: Hip hop
- Length: 3:39
- Label: Star Trak; Arista
- Songwriters: Trevor Smith Jr.; Pharrell Williams; Chad Hugo
- Producer: The Neptunes

Busta Rhymes singles chronology
"Fire (Yes, Yes Y'all)" (2003)	"Light Your Ass on Fire" (2003)	"Shorty (Put It on the Floor)" (2003)

Pharrell Williams singles chronology
"Frontin'" (2003)	"Light Your Ass on Fire" (2003)	"It Blows My Mind" (2003)

Music video
- "Light Your Ass on Fire" on YouTube

"Light Your Ass on Fire" is a song by American rapper Busta Rhymes featuring American singer Pharrell Williams and actor Bokeem Woodbine, released on July 22, 2003 as the fourth single from The Neptunes' compilation album Clones (2003).

== Composition ==
The song uses a stripped-down beat consisting of synthesized drums. Pharrell performs the chorus.

== Critical reception ==
Steve "Flash" Juon of RapReviews described the song as "one of those Neptunes tracks that's right for being so wrong, a feeling those who heard DJ Premier and Jeru the Damaja wrecking 'Come Clean' to a decade ago can relate to." He also commented that despite the simple production, "at times a pile of tools seems to clatter to the floor in a cacophony of noise; most notably after the first chorus. It's electronic, obtuse, and has enough boom and pound for Busta to tie it together with his manic energy that makes even a whispered rap seem louder than a thunderstorm." Preezy Brown of Revolt called the song a "futuristic sounding club banger" and the "2003 equivalent to 'Planet Rock.'"

== Charts ==
Chart (2003)	Peak position
Australia (ARIA)	52
Germany (GfK)	86
Switzerland (Schweizer Hitparade)	40
UK Singles (OCC)	62
US Billboard Hot 100	58
US Hot R&B/Hip-Hop Songs (Billboard)	23
US Hot Rap Songs (Billboard)	12
