= Mr. Me Too =

Single by Clipse featuring Pharrell Williams

from the album Hell Hath No Fury
- Released: May 23, 2006
- Recorded: 2006
- Genre: Hip-hop
- Length: 3:41
- Label: Star Trak; Re-Up; Jive
- Songwriters: Gene Thornton; Terrence Thornton; Pharrell Williams
- Producer: The Neptunes

Clipse singles chronology
| "Hot Damn" (2003) | "Mr. Me Too" (2006) | "Wamp Wamp (What It Do)" (2006) |

Pharrell Williams singles chronology
| "Angel" (2006) | "Mr. Me Too" (2006) | "Margarita" (2006) |

"Mr. Me Too" is a song by American hip-hop duo Clipse, released on May 23, 2006 as the lead single from their second studio album Hell Hath No Fury (2006). The song features guest vocals and production by Pharrell Williams. It is considered to be a diss track aimed at fellow American rapper Lil Wayne, after he graced the cover of Vibe magazine with A Bathing Ape hoodie, a brand which was at that time popularized by Clipse. Lyrically, the song is a braggadocio rap record, where the rappers boast about their fashion and style, while denouncing imitators.

== Background and composition ==
On MTV, Pusha T explained the song's meaning: "It's the total disruption of radio. There's nothing on radio that will even be close to it. It just addresses Mr. Me Toos. Mr. Me Too is the person that sits there and examines your style and takes a piece of it. It addresses the competitive dude on the street who, when you get this or that they're like, 'Me too.'" He also said that the track also touches on some of what they went through with their label: "Briefly, 'cause we don't dwell."

The song also contains a reference to record label Jive, where Pusha T apologizes for the constant album delays ("These are the days of our lives / And I'm sorry to the fans but those crackers weren't playin' fair at Jive.") There was a W.V. boy working alongside them.

The "minimalist" production of "Mr. Me Too" consists of "little more than wheezing synthesizers" according to Nathan Rabin of The A.V. Club, who noted how "the track perfectly embodies Pharrell's less-is-more musical philosophy".

== Music video ==
The music video was directed by Daren Jackson. The video features cameo appearances from Re-Up Gang, Gillie Da Kid, and Bump J of Major Figgas.

== Charts ==
| Chart (2006) | Peak position |
|---|---|
| US Hot R&B/Hip-Hop Songs (Billboard) | 65 |

== Personnel ==
- Written by Gene Thorton, Terrence Thornton, Ian McNeally and Pharrell Williams
- Produced by The Neptunes
- All instruments by The Neptunes
- Original Compositions from Preacha related to 10th Ave. Productions
