= Hell Hath No Fury (Clipse album) =

Studio album by Clipse
- Released: November 28, 2006
- Recorded: Late 2003 – 2006
- Studio: Hovercraft Studios (Virginia Beach)
- Genre: Hip-hop
- Length: 48:41
- Labels: Re-Up Gang; Star Trak; Arista; Zomba
- Producer: The Neptunes

Clipse chronology
Lord Willin' (2002)	Hell Hath No Fury (2006)	Til the Casket Drops (2009)

Singles from Hell Hath No Fury
- 1. "Mr. Me Too" Released: May 23, 2006; 2. "Wamp Wamp (What It Do)" Released: October 31, 2006

Hell Hath No Fury is the second studio album by hip-hop duo Clipse. The album was released on November 28, 2006 in the United States by Re-Up Gang, Star Trak, Arista, and Zomba. Recording sessions for the album took place over a period of several years, and suffered numerous delays prior to release. Production was credited to The Neptunes, though Pusha T later claimed that Pharrell Williams produced it alone.

Hell Hath No Fury landed at Number 14 on the Billboard 200 with 78,000 copies sold in the first week. Two singles were released prior to the album, "Mr. Me Too" and "Wamp Wamp (What It Do)", both of which attained moderate chart success. The album received universal acclaim, and is regarded as one of the best albums of the 2000s.

== Background ==
After releasing Lord Willin' and going on tour, Clipse began recording the album in late 2003. Work on the album was halted in 2004, when Arista Records—their label at the time—was dissolved into its sister label Jive Records, as part of a larger merger between Sony Music Entertainment and BMG. Star Trak Entertainment moved on to Interscope Records, but due to contractual issues, the group was forced to stay with Jive.

While Clipse resumed work on the album, its release was delayed by Jive throughout the rest of 2004 and much of 2005. Additional delays resulted when Clipse sued Jive after the label refused to grant the group a release from its contract. These legal issues would not be resolved until May 2006. Further delays pushed the release date to August 29 then to October 31 and then November 28.

Two singles were released prior to the album. "Mr. Me Too" was released on May 23, 2006 and peaked at Number 65 on Hot R&B/Hip-Hop Songs chart. The song contained a reference to their record label Jive where Pusha T apologized to the fans for the constant album delays and blamed them on the executives at Jive. "Wamp Wamp (What It Do)" was released on October 31 later that year and peaked at Number 96.

== Music and lyrics ==
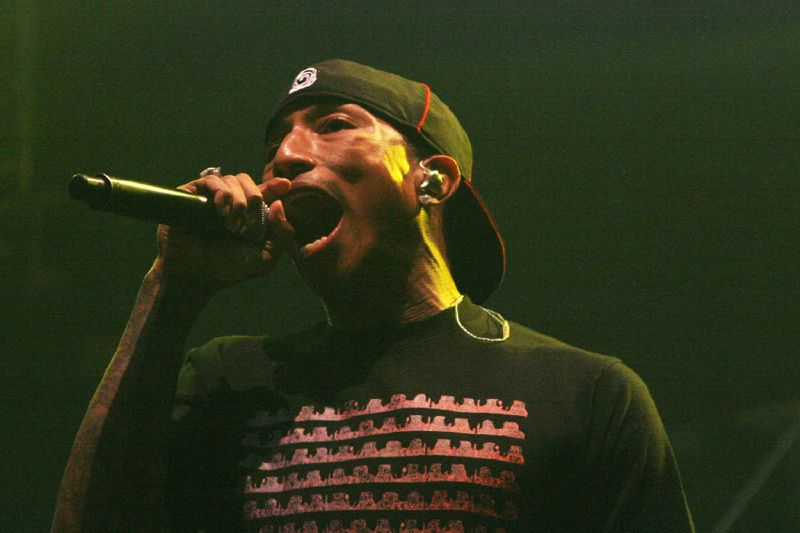
Pharrell Williams featured on 2 different tracks, while providing vocals for 5 more.

The music and tone on Hell Hath No Fury is much darker compared to their debut album due to the group's problematic relationship with Jive Records. From an interview with AllHipHop in July 2006, Pusha T said:

We were ready to get into the thick of things with the success of the first album. The songs we had done were really hot, but at that point in time we were in a different place, we were happier. Time passed, and we saw it was a big hold up, and the momentum, the people that waited for us, we took too long. We couldn't dare come out in the same mind frame as we did in Lord Willin' - so now, we were mad, angry and pissed the fuck off.

The lyrical focus of the album is primarily drug-dealing, which was what the Clipse were best known for. There were themes of excess, street life, crime, money, and braggadocio employed as well. Pitchfork said:

This album isn't about cocaine per se; it's the aftershock of a coke sale-infused existence. The results spray everywhere, from the vacant spending spree of "Dirty Money" to the terrifyingly earned braggadocio of "Trill". This is lifestyle assertion, not something as negligible and confined as drug music.

The album featured a lot of experimental styles of production, compared to the one-way production Lord Willin' had. Pitchfork mentions:

The Neptunes' mystifying, irregular sonics further elevate the record. When the drum sounds are light and chimey, the surrounding melodies sound sinister and serpentine. Otherwise that formula is completely flipped, as doorknocker snares often accompany spacious arrangements. It's an interesting juxtaposition; fitting the furious and odd against bubbly and blissful. But this is what The Neptunes have always done best. Accordions, steel pan drums, harps, distorted synths, cowbell- Pharrell Williams and Chad Hugo throw everything at Clipse (One assumes Hugo, whose work has leaned toward the dark and spare beats in the past, had a large hand in this album). "Trill" and "Ride Around Shining" in particular are monstrous, freakishly beautiful constructions. "Trill" surrounds you with its blown-out bass sound while the tense harp plucks of "Ride", posed against clipped groans and a single straining high note, are both fractured and gorgeous.

In a 2025 interview, Pusha T attributed all production to Pharrell Williams, saying Chad Hugo was not involved. Asked if new music from the Clipse would be "missing" anything with Hugo not having a hand in production, Pusha said:

"Everybody knows my favorite album is Hell Hath No Fury. Pharrell did that alone. That's it.[...] Chad's my guy. I love Chad. Pharrell's my guy, love Chad, too. We're brothers, we came up together. But, you know, when you say missing in the music, there is no missing in the music when it comes to the Clipse."

The album had features from Pharrell Williams, Slim Thug, Bilal and Re-up Gang members Ab-Liva and Sandman. Pharrell Williams also provided background vocals for 5 songs in the album.

== Critical reception ==
Professional ratings
Aggregate scores
Source	Rating
Metacritic	89/100
Review scores
Source	Rating
AllMusic	5/5 stars
The A.V. Club	B+
Entertainment Weekly	A
The Guardian	5/5 stars
MSN Music (Consumer Guide)	A
Observer Music Monthly	5/4 stars
Pitchfork	9.1/10
Rolling Stone	4/5 stars
Spin	8/10
XXL	5/5 stars

Hell Hath No Fury was met with widespread critical acclaim. At Metacritic, which assigns a normalized rating out of 100 to reviews from professional publications, the album received an average score of 89 based on 29 reviews, indicating "universal acclaim".

Allmusic gave it a 5 star rating, and editor Andy Kellman said "Hell Hath No Fury is a lean, furious, cold-blooded album that is vividly to-the-point". Entertainment Weekly gave it an A, stating "Record company nonsense delayed Hell Hath No Fury, the crack-rap duo’s second CD, for eons, but it was worth the wait". The Guardian gave it a score of full 5 stars, claiming "There's not an ounce of fat here". The album was the sixth in the history of XXL magazine to receive the legendary "XXL" rating. Pitchfork gave it a score of 9.1, and told "The long-suffering Pusha and Malice finally issue their troublesome sophomore album; a record packed with a dozen unrelenting tales of desperation and distribution, glamour and gloating that features bleak, spare Neptunes beats. It was worth the wait". The Observer gave the album a perfect score, citing "Hell Hath No Fury is as lyrically kaleidoscopic as it is conceptually monochrome. Track after track flays the central theme, but with such consistently inventive language it seems almost churlish to dwell on its moral bankruptcy". Spin gave it a 4 star score, and noted "On Hell Hath No Fury, Clipse transform cliches into poetry". Rolling Stone also gave the album the same rating and praised the Neptune's production on the album, saying "So why is it one of the best hip-hop albums of the year? For one, nobody gets the beats—dry, hard and evil—that Clipse get from Pharrell Williams and Chad Hugo". Nathan Rabin of The A.V. Club pointed out "In an age where the prevalence of superstars in guest spots threatens to turn solo albums into compilations or mix-tapes, Fury refreshingly represents the undiluted musical vision of Clipse brothers Malice and Pusha T and longtime pal Pharrell". He gave the album a score of B+, which is equivalent to a numerical score of 83 out of 100. Other ratings included a 4 out 5 star rating given by and NME, Q, Vibe, Billboard, Dot music, Paste and Pop Matters. Los Angeles Times gave Hell Hath No Fury a score of 75, responding "There's a cold efficiency in how the Clipse delivers songs built on street-corner cockiness and billfold bluster. It's all shamelessly amoral, but the Clipse wouldn't be such savvy hustlers if they didn't know how to sling with style".

== Accolades ==
The album was ranked first on Prefix magazine's "Best Albums of 2006". Blender magazine placed it number 6 on "The 50 Greatest CDs of 2006". The Sunday Times, which ranked it fourth in its list of the best pop and rock records of 2007, called it a "claustrophobically edgy account of drug-dealing and paranoia, whipped up by The Neptunes into a storm of sonic inventiveness no other hip-hop release in 2007 came close to matching."

Music website Soul In Stereo placed it as the 4th best rap album of the 2000s. AllMusic placed the album at number 16 in their list of "100 Favorite Albums of The 2000s". Review aggregate site Metacritic placed the album tied at number 13 in their list of The Best Hip Hop Albums of the 21st Century.

Online music magazine Pitchfork ranked the song "Trill" at number six in "The Top 100 Tracks of 2006" and placed the album as the 7th best album of 2006. Pitchfork would later go on to place the album at number 52 on the list of the Top 200 Albums of the 2000s decade and number 8 on the list of The 100 Best Rap Albums of All Time.

XXL magazine included Hell Hath No Fury in its article of 50 of the Best Hip-Hop Albums Since 2000. The Guardian placed the album at number 73 in its list of The 100 best albums of the 21st century.

In 2010, online music service Rhapsody called it one of the best "Coke Rap" albums ever. In 2012, Complex named the album one of the classic albums of the last decade; further, they placed the album at number 20 in their list of The 100 Best Albums of the 2000s.

Year-end lists
Publication	List	Rank	Ref.
Prefix	Best Albums of 2006	1	
Cokemachineglow	Top 50 Albums of 2006	2	
Diffuser Fm	Top 40 Albums of 2006	8	
The Sunday Times	Best Pop and Rock records of 2007	4	
Blender	The 50 Greatest CDs of 2006	6	
Pitchfork	Top 50 Albums of 2006	7	
Spin	The 40 Best Albums of 2006	9	
DigitalDreamDoor	100 Greatest Albums of 2006	6	
LiveAbout	10 Best Hip-Hop Albums of 2006	7	

== Commercial performance ==
The album debuted on Number 14 on the Billboard 200 and Number 2 on Top R&B/Hip-Hop albums chart selling 80,000 copies within its first week of availability. As of December 5, 2009 the album has sold 205,000 copies in the United States.

== Track listing ==
All tracks produced by The Neptunes.

No.	Title	Writer(s)	Length
1.	"We Got It for Cheap (Intro)"	Terrence Thornton; Gene Thornton; Pharrell Williams	3:41
2.	"Momma I'm So Sorry"	T. Thornton; G. Thornton; Williams	3:57
3.	"Mr. Me Too" (featuring Pharrell Williams)	T. Thornton; G. Thornton; Williams	3:41
4.	"Wamp Wamp (What It Do)" (featuring Slim Thug)	T. Thornton; G. Thornton; Williams; Stayve Thomas	4:00
5.	"Ride Around Shining" (featuring Ab-Liva)	T. Thornton; G. Thornton; Williams; Rennard East	3:56
6.	"Dirty Money"	T. Thornton; G. Thornton; Williams	3:46
7.	"Hello New World"	T. Thornton; G. Thornton; Williams	4:12
8.	"Keys Open Doors"	T. Thornton; G. Thornton; Williams	3:19
9.	"Ain't Cha" (featuring Re-Up Gang)	T. Thornton; G. Thornton; Williams; East; Charles Patterson	4:42
10.	"Trill"	T. Thornton; G. Thornton; Williams	4:33
11.	"Chinese New Year" (featuring Roscoe P. Coldchain)	T. Thornton; G. Thornton; Williams; Amin Porter	3:54
12.	"Nightmares" (featuring Bilal and Pharrell Williams)	T. Thornton; G. Thornton; Williams; Bilal Oliver; Willie Dennis; Brad Jordan; Doug King	4:50
Total length:			48:41

Leftover tracks

- "Definition of a Roller" (featuring Miles)
- "Stuntin' Y'all" (featuring Pharrell Williams)
- "Double Down" (featuring Vybz Kartel)

=== Notes ===
- "Momma I'm So Sorry," "Dirty Money," "Hello New World," "Trill" and "Chinese New Year" feature background vocals by Pharrell Williams.

== Personnel ==
Credits for Hell Hath No Fury adapted from Allmusic

- Clipse - Primary Artist
- Ab-Liva - Primary Artist
- Re-Up Gang - Primary Artist
- Slim Thug - Primary Artist
- Bilal - Primary Artist
- Rosco P. Coldchain - Primary Artist
- Pharrell Williams - Primary Artist, Background Vocals
- The Neptunes - Audio Production, Producer
- D.L. King - Composer
- A.F. Porter - Composer
- S. Thomas - Composer
- T. Gozney Thornton - Composer
- Andrew Coleman - Engineer, Mixing
- Hart Gunther - Assistant Engineer, Mixing Assistant
- Chris Gehringer - Mastering
- Leticia Hilliard - A&R
- Mark Pitts - A&R
- Jonathan Mannion - Photography
- Courtney Walter - Art Direction, Design

== Charts ==
=== Weekly charts ===
Chart (2006)	Peak position
US Billboard 200	14
US Top R&B/Hip-Hop Albums (Billboard)	2

=== Year-end charts ===
Chart (2007)	Position
US Top R&B/Hip-Hop Albums	78
