= List of UK R&B Albums Chart number ones of 2003 =

The logo of the Official Charts Company, responsible for compiling all of the official music charts in the United Kingdom, including the R&B albums chart.

The UK R&B Chart is a weekly chart, first introduced in October 1994, that ranks the 40 biggest-selling singles and albums that are classified in the R&B genre in the United Kingdom. The chart is compiled by the Official Charts Company, and is based on sales of CDs, downloads, vinyl and other formats over the previous seven days.

The following are the number-one albums of 2003.

== Number-one albums ==
| Issue date | Album | Artist(s) | Record label | Ref. |
|---|---|---|---|---|
| 5 January | Missundaztood | Pink | Arista | |
| 12 January | Justified | Justin Timberlake | Jive | |
| 19 January | Justified | Justin Timberlake | Jive | |
| 26 January | Justified | Justin Timberlake | Jive | |
| 2 February | Justified | Justin Timberlake | Jive | |
| 9 February | Justified | Justin Timberlake | Jive | |
| 16 February | Justified | Justin Timberlake | Jive | |
| 23 February | Justified | Justin Timberlake | Jive | |
| 2 March | Justified | Justin Timberlake | Jive | |
| 9 March | Justified | Justin Timberlake | Jive | |
| 16 March | Justified | Justin Timberlake | Jive | |
| 23 March | This Is Me... Then | Jennifer Lopez | Epic | |
| 30 March | Justified | Justin Timberlake | Jive | |
| 6 April | The Very Best of Pure R&B - Summer 2003 | Various Artists | BMG/Telstar TV | |
| 13 April | The Very Best of Pure R&B - Summer 2003 | Various Artists | BMG/Telstar TV | |
| 20 April | Justified | Justin Timberlake | Jive | |
| 27 April | Justified | Justin Timberlake | Jive | |
| 4 May | Justified | Justin Timberlake | Jive | |
| 11 May | Justified | Justin Timberlake | Jive | |
| 18 May | Justified | Justin Timberlake | Jive | |
| 25 May | Justified | Justin Timberlake | Jive | |
| 1 June | Justified | Justin Timberlake | Jive | |
| 8 June | Justified | Justin Timberlake | Jive | |
| 15 June | Justified | Justin Timberlake | Jive | |
| 22 June | Justified | Justin Timberlake | Jive | |
| 29 June | Dangerously in Love | Beyoncé | Columbia/Music World | |
| 6 July | Dangerously in Love | Beyoncé | Columbia/Music World | |
| 13 July | Dangerously in Love | Beyoncé | Columbia/Music World | |
| 20 July | Dangerously in Love | Beyoncé | Columbia/Music World | |
| 27 July | Dangerously in Love | Beyoncé | Columbia/Music World | |
| 3 August | Dangerously in Love | Beyoncé | Columbia/Music World | |
| 10 August | Dangerously in Love | Beyoncé | Columbia/Music World | |
| 17 August | Dangerously in Love | Beyoncé | Columbia/Music World | |
| 24 August | Clones | The Neptunes | Star Trak/Arista | |
| 31 August | Clones | The Neptunes | Star Trak/Arista | |
| 7 September | Clones | The Neptunes | Star Trak/Arista | |
| 14 September | Boy in da Corner | Dizzee Rascal | XL | |
| 21 September | Grand Champ | DMX | Ruff Ryders/Def Jam | |
| 28 September | The R. in R&B Collection, Vol. 1 | R. Kelly | Jive | |
| 5 October | Cheers | Obie Trice | Shady/Interscope | |
| 12 October | Cheers | Obie Trice | Shady/Interscope | |
| 19 October | Cheers | Obie Trice | Shady/Interscope | |
| 26 October | Kill Bill Vol. 1 Original Soundtrack | Various Artists | A Band Apart/Maverick/Warner Bros. | |
| 2 November | R&B Love | Various Artists | Sony TV/Warner Dance | |
| 9 November | Westwood Platinum Edition | Various Artists | Def Jam | |
| 16 November | Westwood Platinum Edition | Various Artists | Def Jam | |
| 23 November | Beg for Mercy | G-Unit | G-Unit/Interscope | |
| 30 November | Elephunk | The Black Eyed Peas | A&M/will.i.am | |
| 7 December | The Diary of Alicia Keys | Alicia Keys | J | |
| 14 December | Elephunk | The Black Eyed Peas | A&M/will.i.am | |
| 21 December | Elephunk | The Black Eyed Peas | A&M/will.i.am | |
| 28 December | Elephunk | The Black Eyed Peas | A&M/will.i.am | |

== See also ==
- List of UK Albums Chart number ones of the 2010s
