= Lord Willin' =

2002 studio album by Clipse

Studio album by Clipse
- Released: August 20, 2002
- Recorded: 2001–2002
- Genre: East Coast hip-hop
- Length: 52:41
- Labels: Star Trak; Arista
- Producer: The Neptunes

Clipse chronology
Exclusive Audio Footage (1999)	Lord Willin' (2002)	Hell Hath No Fury (2006)

Singles from Lord Willin'
- 1. "Grindin'" Released: May 14, 2002; 2. "When the Last Time" Released: July 30, 2002; 3. "Ma, I Don't Love Her" Released: December 3, 2002; 4. "Cot Damn" Released: April 29, 2003

Lord Willin' is the debut studio album by the American hip-hop duo Clipse. The album was released on August 20, 2002, in the United States by Star Trak and Arista. Recording sessions took place over a year, beginning in 2001. Production was handled by The Neptunes.

Following the shelving of their original debut studio album Exclusive Audio Footage by Elektra Records, long-time friends and collaborators The Neptunes signed the duo onto their record label Star Trak Entertainment. The Neptunes would go on to handle the production on Lord Willin', with Pharrell Williams featuring on 6 different tracks, including the hit singles "Grindin'" and "When the Last Time". Additional features include Ab Liva, Roscoe P. Coldchain, Faith Evans, Fabolous, Jadakiss and Styles P. The deluxe edition of the album contained two more tracks, which were remixes of "Grindin'".

The album debuted at number four on the Billboard 200 and number one on the Top R&B/Hip-Hop Albums chart, selling 122,000 units in its first week of release. The album was well received by critics, and is considered one of the best hip-hop albums of the 2000s.

The album was ranked 12 on Rolling Stone's 100 Best Debut Albums of All-Time list.

== Background ==
After the duo formed in 1992, Clipse had trouble securing a record label contract. Childhood friend and producer Pharrell Williams helped them secure a deal with Elektra Records in 1996. With help from Williams' production duo The Neptunes, Clipse began recording material for their debut studio album Exclusive Audio Footage. They released their first single "The Funeral", which helped gain fan interest but failed to make a significant commercial or chart impact. With "The Funeral" being considered a commercial failure, Elektra Records shelved the album and the duo was dropped from the label.

In early 2001, Williams signed the duo to Arista Records through his recently established Star Trak imprint. With the backing of The Neptunes and the record label, Clipse proceeded to begin recording material for Lord Willin'.

== Singles ==
Two singles were released prior to the album. The lead single, "Grindin'", was released on May 14, 2002. The song became a summer Top 40 hit, reaching number 30 on the Billboard Hot 100 chart. It has since been regarded by numerous publications as one of the best songs of the 2000s. It was ranked at number 23 on BBC's Greatest Hip Hop Songs of All-Time list. The second single, "When the Last Time", was released on July 30. It is the duo's highest and longest charting song to date, peaking at number 19 on the Hot 100, and staying on the chart for 21 weeks.

After the release of the album, two more singles were released off the album. "Ma, I Don't Love Her" was released on December 3, 2002, and was a modest hit, peaking at number 86 on the Billboard Hot 100 chart. The fourth and final single from the album, "Hot Damn", was released on April 29, 2003. It is titled as "Cot Damn" on the album, and was also released as a promotional single for The Neptunes' 2003 compilation album Clones. It peaked at number 58 on Hot R&B/Hip-Hop Songs.

== Critical reception ==
Professional ratings
Review scores
Source	Rating
AllMusic	4/5 stars
Blender	4/5 stars
The Boston Phoenix	3/4 stars
Entertainment Weekly	B+
Los Angeles Times	3/4 stars
HipHopDX	3.5/5 stars
Rolling Stone	3/5 stars
The Rolling Stone Album Guide	4/5 stars
USA Today	3.5/4 stars

Lord Willin' was met with positive reviews from music critics. M.F. DiBella of AllMusic, who gave it a 4 star rating out of 5 said "While the two MCs' presence is invariably formidable on virtually all of the tracks, the Neptunes' pop-ish turn in their beatwork doesn't always do justice to the depths that the Clipse MCs wish to plunder". Raymond Fiore of Entertainment Weekly stated "On Lord Willin', brothers Malice and Pusha T seize the moment with hustlers’ tales culled from Virginia's mean streets, a raw complement to the music's artsy, unrepentant grime." Los Angeles Times gave the album a 3 star out of 4 rating, stating that "The results are blissful, as the body-rocking, futuristic beats mesh magically with the clever, straightforward rapping of the two MCs, who inject sly humor and hard-core boasting into nearly every lyric." USA Today also had a similar approach, awarding the album a 3.5 star rating out of 4.

=== Accolades ===
Pitchfork placed Lord Willin' at number 155 on their list of top 200 albums of the 2000s. Slant Magazine placed the album on their list of best albums of the 2000s at number 98. Complex included Lord Willin' in their list of The 100 Best Albums of the 2000s.

== Commercial performance ==
In its first week of release, Lord Willin' sold 122,000 units, debuting at number four on the Billboard 200 and number one on the Top R&B/Hip-Hop Albums chart. It was certified Gold by the RIAA on October 1, 2002. The album continued to gradually sell after that; as of December 2009, it has sold 960,000 copies according to Nielsen Soundscan.

== Track listing ==
Credits adapted from Tidal.
All tracks produced by The Neptunes.

No.	Title	Writer(s)	Length
1.	"Intro"	Terrence Thornton; Gene Thornton; Pharrell Williams; Chad Hugo	2:16
2.	"Young Boy"	T. Thornton; G. Thornton; Williams; Hugo	4:25
3.	"Virginia"	T. Thornton; G. Thornton; Williams; Hugo	3:57
4.	"Grindin'"	T. Thornton; G. Thornton; Williams; Hugo	4:24
5.	"Hot Damn" (also known as "Cot Damn") (featuring Ab-Liva and Roscoe P. Coldchain)	T. Thornton; G. Thornton; Rennard "Ab-Liva" East; Amin "Roscoe P. Coldchain" Porter; Williams; Hugo	5:01
6.	"Ma, I Don't Love Her" (featuring Faith Evans)	T. Thornton; G. Thornton; Faith Evans; Williams; Hugo	4:17
7.	"FamLay Freestyle" (performed by Fam-Lay)	Nathaniel Johnson; Williams; Hugo	1:57
8.	"When the Last Time"	T. Thornton; G. Thornton; Williams; Hugo	4:14
9.	"Ego"	T. Thornton; G. Thornton; Williams; Hugo	2:48
10.	"Comedy Central" (featuring Fabolous)	T. Thornton; G. Thornton; John Jackson; Williams; Hugo	4:33
11.	"Let's Talk About It" (performed by Jermaine Dupri featuring Clipse)	T. Thornton; G. Thornton; Jermaine Mauldin; Williams; Hugo	5:10
12.	"Gangsta Lean"	T. Thornton; G. Thornton; Williams; Hugo	5:20
13.	"I'm Not You" (featuring Jadakiss, Styles P, and Roscoe P. Coldchain)	T. Thornton; G. Thornton; Jason Phillips; David Styles; Porter; Williams; Hugo	4:19
Total length:			52:41

Bonus tracks
No.	Title	Writer(s)	Length
14.	"Grindin' (Remix)" (featuring Birdman, Lil Wayne, and N.O.R.E.)	T. Thornton; G. Thornton; Bryan Williams; Dwayne Carter, Jr.; N.O.R.E.; P. Williams; Hugo	4:20
15.	"Grindin' (Selector Remix)" (featuring Sean Paul, Bless, and Kardinal Offishall)	T. Thornton; G. Thornton; Sean Henriques; Bless; Jason Harrow; P. Williams; Hugo	3:47
Total length:			60:48

Notes

- All tracks except "Intro", "Comedy Central", and "I'm Not You" feature additional vocals from Pharrell Williams.

== Charts ==
=== Weekly charts ===
Chart (2002)	Peak position
US Billboard 200	4
US Top R&B/Hip-Hop Albums (Billboard)	1

=== Year-end charts ===
Chart (2002)	Position
Canadian R&B Albums (Nielsen SoundScan)	80
Canadian Rap Albums (Nielsen SoundScan)	41
US Billboard 200	127
US Top R&B/Hip-Hop Albums	36
Chart (2003)	Position
US Top R&B/Hip-Hop Albums	90

== Certifications ==
Region	Certification	Certified units/sales
United States (RIAA)	Gold	500,000^{^}
^{^} Shipments figures based on certification alone.
