= It Blows My Mind =

Single by Snoop Dogg featuring Pharrell

from the album The Neptunes Present... Clones
- Released: 2003
- Recorded: December 2002
- Genre: R&B; hip hop
- Length: 5:04
- Label: Arista; Star Trak
- Songwriters: Pharrell Williams; Chad Hugo; Calvin Broadus
- Producer: The Neptunes

Snoop Dogg singles chronology
"Beautiful" (2003)	"It Blows My Mind" (2003)	"Holidae In" (2003)

Pharrell Williams singles chronology
"Light Your Ass on Fire" (2003)	"It Blows My Mind" (2003)	"Change Clothes" (2003)

"It Blows My Mind" is a song by American rapper Snoop Dogg, featuring guest vocals from American musician Pharrell Williams, taken from The Neptunes's first compilation album Clones. The song was written by Snoop Dogg, Chad Hugo and Pharrell, with production handled by The Neptunes.

== Track listing ==
- CD single
1. "It Blows My Mind" (feat. Doc Sun) (featuring Pharrell Williams) — 4:25
2. "It Blows My Mind" (Original Version) (featuring Pharrell Williams) — 5:04
3. "Vote For Snoop" (with Marvin Gaye) — 2:44

== Charts ==
=== Weekly charts ===
Chart (2003)	Peak position
US Hot R&B/Hip-Hop Songs (Billboard)	68
US R&B/Hip-Hop Airplay (Billboard)	65
