= When the Last Time =

Single by Clipse

from the album Lord Willin'
- Released: July 30, 2002
- Recorded: 2002
- Genre: Electro hop
- Length: 4:14
- Label: Star Trak; Arista
- Songwriters: Gene Thornton; Terrence Thornton; Pharrell Williams; Charles Hugo
- Producer: The Neptunes

Clipse singles chronology
"Grindin'" (2002)	"When the Last Time" (2002)	"Like I Love You" (2002)

Pharrell singles chronology
"Boys (The Co-Ed Remix)" (2002)	"When the Last Time" (2002)	"From tha Chuuuch to da Palace" (2002)

"When the Last Time" is the second official single from the Clipse's album Lord Willin'. It reached #19 on the Billboard Hot 100 on the issue dated December 21, 2002—becoming the group's highest-charting single. The video features a freestyle from comedian Shawty. At the very end of the music video, the video features a very short video version of the song "Virginia". Kelis and Pharrell Williams appear uncredited.

== Charts ==
=== Weekly charts ===
Chart (2002–03)	Peak position
UK Singles (OCC)	41
US Billboard Hot 100	19
US Hot R&B/Hip-Hop Songs (Billboard)	8
US Hot Rap Songs (Billboard)	7

=== Year-end charts ===
Chart (2002)	Position
US Hot R&B/Hip-Hop Songs (Billboard)	71
Chart (2003)	Position
US Hot R&B/Hip-Hop Songs (Billboard)	91
