= We Got It 4 Cheap =

Mixtapes by Clipse, Ab-Liva and Sandman

We Got It 4 Cheap is a series of mixtapes released by Virginia hip-hop duo Clipse and Philadelphia-based rappers Ab-Liva and Sandman, collectively known as the Re-Up Gang. The series produced 3 mixtapes, entitled as volumes. Volume 1 and 2 was released in 2004 and 2005 respectively, and was hosted by DJ Clinton Sparks. Volume 3 was released in 2008, and was hosted by DJ Drama. The main theme of all three mixtapes is drug trafficking, which has always been a Clipse and Re-Up Gang trademark. A compilation album, Re-Up Gang the Saga Continues was released on April 22, 2008. The album consisted of 13 best tracks from the previously released mixtapes, all remixed and remastered.

== We Got It 4 Cheap, Vol. 1 ==
We Got It 4 Cheap, Vol. 1

Mixtape by Clipse
- Released: 2004
- Genre: Hip-hop
- Length: 61:15
- Label: Re-Up Records
- Producer: The Neptunes; Clinton Sparks

Professional ratings
Review scores
Source	Rating
Pitchfork	7.0/10
Stylus	B−

We Got It 4 Cheap, Vol. 1 was released in early 2004, and is the first official collection of new material from Clipse since the release of their debut album Lord Willin' in 2002. It is hosted by DJ Clinton Sparks, who helped put the mixtape together, at Pusha T's request. While focused primarily on Clipse, the mixtape also introduced Ab-Liva and Sandman, the other half of their group, the Re-Up Gang. They are both heavily featured throughout its twenty-five tracks, along with Pharrell Williams.

The tape received generally positive reviews from music critics.

=== Track listing ===
#	Title	Instrumental(s)	Time
1	"Intro" (skit)	"The Fall" by Blake Leyh (Closing Theme from The Wire)	0:44
2	"You'll See" (feat. Pharrell)	"You'll See" by The LOX	3:41
3	"Coast to Coast"	"The Whole City Behind Us" by Kanye West, The Game and Ludacris	2:39
4	"Interlude (Who We Do This 4)" (skit)		0:19
5	"I Shot Ya"	"I Shot Ya" by LL Cool J	2:53
6	"Re-Up Anthem"	"Shake That (Remix)" by Ray J and B2K	3:42
7	"You Know My Style"	"You Know My Style" by Nas	3:50
8	"Interlude (Get Familiar)" (skit)		0:16
9	"Drop It Like It's Hot"	"Drop It Like It's Hot" by Snoop Dogg	3:52
10	"Niggas Know"		3:41
11	"Stay from Around Me"	"I Got a Love" by Jin	3:22
12	"Interlude" (skit) (feat. Hassan, Voice of Reason)		0:26
13	"Stuntin' Y'all" (feat. Pharrell Williams)	Original production by The Neptunes	3:48
14	"Interlude (Hit Men)" (skit)		0:24
15	"Radical (Sandman Freestyle)"		2:00
16	"Don't Let Me Die (Ab-Liva Freestyle)"	"Don't Let Me Die" by R. Kelly and Jay-Z	2:27
17	"Interlude (Sandman)" (skit)		0:22
18	"Just a B-Boy"		3:58
19	"Interlude (Ab-Liva)" (skit)		0:22
20	"The Sermon"		3:43
21	"Nothing Like It"	"Nothing Like It" by Beanie Sigel	2:38
22	"Queen Bitch"	"Queen Bitch" by Lil' Kim	3:24
23	"Cross the Border"	"Cross the Border (remix)" by Philly's Most Wanted	3:15
24	"Pussy (remix)"	"Pussy" by Clipse	4:11
25	"Outro" (skit)		1:18

== We Got It 4 Cheap, Vol. 2 ==
We Got It 4 Cheap, Vol. 2

Mixtape by Clipse
- Released: December 31, 2005
- Genre: Hip-hop
- Length: 60:48
- Label: Re-Up Records
- Producer: The Neptunes; Clinton Sparks

Professional ratings
Review scores
Source	Rating
Robert Christgau	(3-star Honorable Mention)
Pitchfork	8.8/10
RapReviews	8.5/10
Stylus	B+

We Got It 4 Cheap, Vol. 2 is the second installment in the We Got It 4 Cheap series. It was released in 2005 as a free internet download and is hosted by DJ Clinton Sparks. It consists of 18 tracks, and heavily features Pharrell Williams and the Re-Up Gang.

The mixtape received widespread critical acclaim from music critics. It holds a score of 88 out of 100 on Album of the Year, based on a single review. Stylus Magazine gave it score of B+, stating "Volume 1 (which overall is still quite good) only seem worse because Vol. 2 is nearly flawless. On 2, the Re-Up Gang reimagines some of the most well-known hits of the first half of 2005, as well as other classics". Pitchfork awarded the tape an 8.8, noting "Volume 2 is the best example of what a mixtape can be". Online blog site RapReviews rated the album to be an 8.5 with editor Tom Doggett saying "Here, the Clipse is immeasurably skilled, rocking every beat imaginable, old-school and new, and doing it with style and substance to spare. The details sear into my skull, from their clothing style to their dealing strategies to the ambitions they have".

Volume 2 is considered to be the best in the series as well as one of the greatest mixtapes of all time. The tape is credited with revolutionizing the mixtape business, allowing to put out quality music despite being free. We Got It 4 Cheap, along with Lil Wayne's Dedication series is said to have influenced the rise of acclaimed online mixtapes. Pitchfork placed the album at number 130 in their list of Top 200 Albums of the 2000s, and at number 2 on their list of the top 50 rap mixtapes of the millennium.

=== Track listing ===
#	Title	Instrumental(s)	Time
1	"Previously on We Got It 4 Cheap"		1:00
2	"Re-Up Intro"	"Intro" by Ludacris	3:51
3	"What's Up" (feat. Pharrell Williams)	"Put You on the Game" by The Game	4:56
4	"Run This Shit"	"So Seductive" by Tony Yayo	3:27
5	"Roll with the Winners"	"Get Ya Shit Together" by T.I.	3:13
6	"Mic Check"	"Mic Check" by Juelz Santana	2:55
7	"Interlude"		1:17
8	"Zen"	Original production by Clinton Sparks	2:58
9	"Hate It or Love It" (feat. Pharrell Williams)	"Hate It or Love It" by The Game	4:31
10	"Play Your Part" (feat. Pharrell Williams)	"Cobra" by Mobb Deep	4:40
11	"Monopoly"	"Next Level (Nyte Time Mix)" by Showbiz and A.G.	3:17
12	"The Corner"	"The Corner" by Common	4:26
13	"I'm a Hustla"	"I'm a Hustla" by Cassidy	3:27
14	"Daytona 500"	"Daytona 500" by Ghostface Killah	2:05
15	"Maybe Interlude"		1:16
16	"Maybe" (feat. Pharrell Williams)	"Elevators (Me & You)" by OutKast	4:11
17	"One Thing"	"1 Thing" by Amerie	4:03
18	"Ultimate Flow"	"Drugs" by Lil' Kim	5:35

== We Got It for Cheap, Vol. 3 ==
We Got It for Cheap: The Mixtape, Vol. 3

Mixtape by Re-Up Gang
- Released: February 5, 2008
- Genre: Hip-hop
- Length: 72:13
- Label: Re-Up Records
- Producer: DJ Drama

Professional ratings
Review scores
Source	Rating
AllHipHop	8.5/10
Blender	3.5/5 stars
DJBooth	4/5 stars
Hip Hop News Live	3.5/5 stars
Pitchfork	7.6/10
Prefix Magazine	7.0/10
Rolling Stone	3.5/5 stars

We Got It for Cheap: The Mixtape, Vol. 3 was released as a free download through the Re-Up Records website on February 5, 2008. Unlike the previous installments in the series, the mixtape was hosted by DJ Drama, with Re-Up Gang now being credited as the main artists on the front cover.

=== Track listing ===
#	Title	Instrumental(s)	Time
1	"Here's What They Think about You Interlude" (skit)		2:18
2	"Re-Up Gang Intro"	"I Hustle" by B.G.	3:59
3	"Show You How to Hustle"	"Show You How to Hustle" by Pharrell	4:04
4	"Roc Boys"	"Roc Boys (And the Winner Is)..." by Jay-Z	3:40
5	"20k Intro" (skit)		0:57
6	"20k Money Making Brothers on the Corner"	Original production by Dame Grease	3:51
7	"Dey Know Yayo"	"Dey Know" by Shawty Lo	4:22
8	"500 Birds Interlude" (skit)		0:34
9	"Scenario 2008"	"Scenario 2000" by Eve	3:37
10	"Good Morning"	"Good Morning" by Kanye West	4:35
11	"Rainy Dayz"	"Rainy Dayz" by Raekwon	4:50
12	"Emotionless"	"Emotionless" by Jim Jones	4:42
13	"Fuck You"	"Fuck You" by The LOX	4:17
14	"Bring It Back"	"Bring It Back" by Jae Millz	4:22
15	"Hand on My Glock" (performed by La the Darkman and Willie the Kid)	"Streetz on Lock" by Hot Dollar	3:28
16	"Cry Now"	"Cry Now" by Obie Trice	4:10
17	"Sand Solo"	"Return of the Hustle" by Fabolous	2:29
18	"Liva Solo"	"Come & Go" by 50 Cent	1:51
19	"Real Niggas"	"Deep Cover" and "Nuthin' but a "G" Thang" by Dr. Dre, "Black Superman" by Above the Law, "Gin and Juice" by Snoop Dogg	5:13
20	"Cheers" (feat. Pharrell Williams)^{1}	Original production by Khao	4:54

Note:

- ^{1} Originally appeared on DJ Drama's debut album, Gangsta Grillz: The Album.
