= Jallal =

American rapper and actor

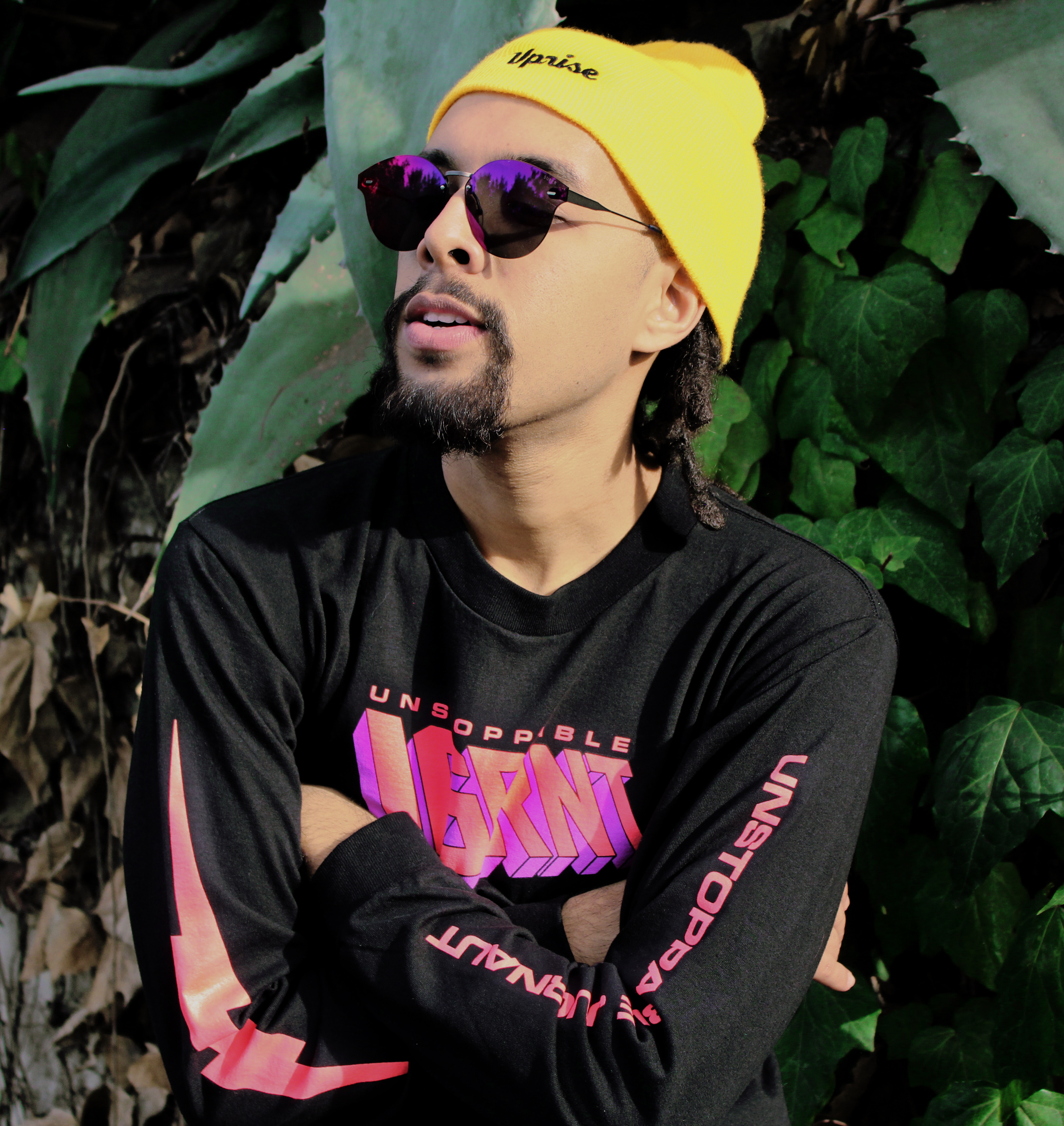

Background information
- Born: Jallaluddin Mohammad Malik; February 10, 1993 (age 33); Los Angeles, CA
- Genre: Hip hop
- Occupation: Rapper
- Years active: 2011-
- Website: jallal.com

Jallaluddin Mohammad Malik (born February 10, 1993, in Los Angeles, California), better known by his stage name Jallal, is an American rapper and actor from Los Angeles, California.

== Career ==
=== Music ===
After spending time under the mentorship of Lupe Fiasco, Jallal released his debut mixtape, Semi-Casual Love, in 2011. Since then, he has released a second mixtape, Unwilling Fortay, along with numerous tracks. The mixtape caught the attention of Yasiin Bey (aka Mos Def), who has since served as a mentor to Jallal. Jallal has opened for Bey on several stops on his US tours starting in 2013.

Jallal appeared on the remix to Olivia Olson's 2013 song "Suspicious". In 2014, he released his first single, "Rocky", featuring Rick Ross and produced by DJ Moza, and "Suicide", featuring BJ the Chicago Kid. In 2015, he released the single "Gone Girl", featuring RDGLDGRN.

In February 2017, Jallal released the single "Imma Dog". It was produced by CashMoneyAP. He followed that up with "2:00 AM", produced by Goddy Beats, which Vibe magazine called "a flossy number that serves as the soundtrack for all of our late night rendezvous." In May 2017, Jallal released the single "Toss & Turn" featuring Ne-Yo, produced by Hugo, James and Jan Fairchild. In June 2017, he released the single "Never Forgotten", featuring BJ The Chicago Kid, Kaye Fox and Georgia Anne Muldrow. The four tracks are included on his 15-track mixtape Off the Radar, which was released on June 14, 2017. It features additional appearances from 2 Chainz, Lil Wayne, T-Pain and Yo Gotti, and production from Chad Hugo of The Neptunes, Elliot James of Hey Monday, and DJ Moza. In March 2018, he released the single "Without Drake, Mos Def and Lupe Fiasco", produced by Killa J and DJ Moza.

In 2018, Jallal put out the singles "The Truth" and "The Heat". In April 2019 he released the single "You Gon' See", produced by Arteen Mozafari. In August 2019 he released the music video for "We Made the Same". The song features the actress Tala Ashe.

== Discography ==
=== Singles ===
- "Rocky" (feat. Rick Ross) (January 26, 2014)
- "Gone Girl" (feat. RDGLDGRN) (October 21, 2015)
- "Over Now" (February 11, 2016)
- "Control Me" (feat. Stoomie and Chris Taylor) (March 9, 2016)
- "Friday Night Lights" (feat. Stoomie) (March 9, 2016)
- "Imma Dog" (February 15, 2017)
- "2:00 AM" (March 20, 2017)
- "Toss & Turn" (feat. Ne-Yo) (May 3, 2017)
- "Never Forgotten" (feat. BJ The Chicago Kid, Kaye Fox and Georgia Anne Muldrow, June 7, 2017)
- "Without Drake, Mos Def and Lupe Fiasco" (March 9, 2018)
- "The Truth" (August 28, 2018)
- "The Heat" (September 27, 2018)
- "You Gon' See" (April 4, 2019)
- "We Made the Same" (feat. Tala Ashe) (August 19, 2019)
- "Lets Ride" (with Slushii) (2022)

=== Appears on ===
- "Suspicious" (remix) – Olivia Olson feat. Jallal (August 27, 2013)

=== Mixtapes ===
- Semi-Casual Love (2011)
- Unwilling Fortay (2013)
- Off the Radar (2017)

== Personal life ==
Jallal is a Muslim.
