= Re-up =

Re-Up may refer to:

- Eminem Presents: The Re-Up, a hip hop compilation album
- Re-Up Gang, a hip hop group
- Re-Up Records, a hip hop record label
- Re-Up (magazine)
