= 1800 Seconds =

Compilation album by ten different DIY artists

Compilation album by Various Artists
- Released: December 7, 2018
- Genre: Hip hop
- Length: 30:00
- Label: Mass Appeal; Re-Up Gang
- Producer: Pusha T (also exec.); Metro Boomin; G Koop; Sean "Puff Daddy" Combs; Makavelee; Twan Da God; Blrd Music; J.LBS; Bryan Kitching; Terrell Johnson; Ahkeem Jamaal Thomas; OG Parker; OB; Larce Blake; Tal Halprin; Hass Irv; Maajei Vu

Pusha T chronology
| Daytona (2018) | 1800 Seconds: Curated By Pusha-T (2018) | It's Almost Dry (2022) |

1800 Seconds: Curated By Pusha-T, commonly referred to as 1800 Seconds, is a compilation album by ten different DIY artists curated by the hip-hop artist Pusha T, released on December 7, 2018, by Re-Up Gang Records and Mass Appeal Records. The album consists of up-and-coming voices, hailing from all over the United States. Ant White from Philly, PA, Cartel Count Up from Hampton, VA, Don Zio P from Middletown, CT, Hass Irv from Harlem, NY, Monalyse from Detroit, MI, Nita Jonez from Houston, TX, Sam Austins from Detroit, MI, T Got Bank from Brooklyn, NY, Trevor Lanier from Wilmington, NC, and Tyler Thomas from Los Angeles, CA.

== Track listing ==
Credits adapted from liner notes.

| No. | Title | Writer(s) | Original artist | Length |
|---|---|---|---|---|
| 1. | "Intro" | Terrence Thornton, Leland Tyler Wayne | Pusha T | 0:29 |
| 2. | "Make It Count" | Christopher Thomas Council, Jalen Fidal Lee | Cartel Count Up | 2:19 |
| 3. | "Rockin Heels" | Quanita Jones | Nita Jonez | 3:18 |
| 4. | "Hotel" | Ryan Moran, Phillip Santavenere, Kedar Fluker | Don Zio P | 3:08 |
| 5. | "Player Shit" | Tyler Thomas | Tyler Thomas | 3:46 |
| 6. | "All I Know" | Anthony T. White | Ant White | 2:33 |
| 7. | "Motivation" | Sam Bonhart | Sam Austins | 3:19 |
| 8. | "A Lot" | Taurean Moody | T Got Bank | 2:34 |
| 9. | "Me & My" | Morgan Claiborne | Monalyse | 2:14 |
| 10. | "Secrets" | Hass Irv, Nathaniel Alford | Hass Irv | 3:20 |
| 11. | "Lil Mama" | Trevor Lanier, Orwell Uwaezucke, Demiko Wilson | Trevor Lanier | 2:55 |
| Total length: | | | | 30:00 |

Notes

- Track listing and credits from Tidal.
