= Hot Damn (song) =

2003 single by Clipse

Single by Clipse featuring Ab-Liva and Roscoe P. Coldchain

from the album The Neptunes Present... Clones and Lord Willin'
- Released: April 29, 2003
- Recorded: 2002
- Genre: Hip-hop
- Label: Star Trak; Arista
- Songwriters: Gene Thornton; Terrence Thornton; Bryan Williams; Pharrell Williams; Charles Hugo
- Producer: The Neptunes

Clipse singles chronology
"Ma, I Don't Love Her" (2003)	"Hot Damn" (2003)	"Mr. Me Too" (2006)

"Hot Damn" is the lead single by Clipse from the Neptunes's compilation album Clones. The song also appears from their debut album, Lord Willin' titled as "Cot Damn".

== Charts ==
Chart (2003)	Peak position
US Hot R&B/Hip-Hop Songs (Billboard)	58
