= Hear Ye Him =

Studio album by No Malice
- Released: August 18, 2013
- Recorded: 2010–2013
- Length: 43:05
- Label: Reinvision
- Producer: Cam Calloway; Chad Hugo; Greg Fears Jr.; Grip Productions; Illmind; J-Maxx; Michael Etheridge; Nando Pro; PK Oneday; The Profound Sounds; S1

No Malice chronology
Hear Ye Him (2013)	Let the Dead Bury the Dead (2017)

Hear Ye Him is the debut solo studio album by American rapper No Malice. The album was released independently on his 41st birthday, August 18, 2013, by Reinvision. The album features guest appearances from Ab-Liva, Pusha T, Fam-Lay and Jaeson Ma, among others.

== Overview ==
At a concert on April 30, 2010, No Malice announced that he and Pusha T would release solo albums later in the year. On March 6, 2012, he announced his intention to change his name from Malice to No Malice. On May 21, 2013, it was announced the intended album release on July 2, 2013, but the album was later pushed back. In May 2013, during an interview with Hip Hop Since 1987, No Malice spoke about what to expect from the album, saying:

"The album is entitled Hear Ye Him. One time I was listening to all my tracks and I got this rush of chills all over my body. This is by far my best work ever. It’s inspirational. It makes for great music, and not only that, when that record goes off it’s gonna leave you with a lot to think about. What I’ve come to find is that when a lot of people hear my story and hear this new direction, it really breaks the ice. And a lot of people can identify. And then sometimes we just need that person to be the first to break the ice. And then you’ll see that a lot of people actually have experienced a lot of the same things and feel the same way."

In June 2013, during an interview with Vibe, No Malice spoke about some of the producers and features on the album, saying: "I have, of course, Chad Hugo. I have S1, Illmind and a group of guys from Virginia that goes by the name of Profound Sounds who actually did the title cut "Hear Ye Him." They also did "Bury That" as well. There's also a young lady here from Virginia named Bri and she's on a song called "Different." She's a young 19-year-old with an incredible voice. John Bibbs, he's from Richmond, also on "Bury That." Cam Calloway. He produced a song called "Blasphemy," that's featuring Famlay. I definitely kept the spotlight on Virginia." On July 17, 2013, it was announced the intended released on August 18, 2013. On July 29, 2013, the final track listing and album cover were revealed, revealing 17 tracks and guest appearances on the album from Ab-Liva, Fam-Lay, Life Dutchee, Pusha T, Jon Bibbs, Eric David, PK Oneday, Bri and Jaeson Ma.

== Release and promotion ==
On June 19, 2012, the first song from the album "June" featuring Eric David was released. On July 11, 2012, the music video was released for "June". On July 24, 2012, the second song from the album "Unforgettable" featuring Life Dutchee was released, with the music video for the song following on September 18, 2012. On January 15, 2013, the third song from the album "Smoke & Mirrors" featuring Ab-Liva was released. On January 23, 2013, the music video was released for "Smoke & Mirrors". On June 4, 2013, the fourth song from the album, "Bury That" featuring Jon Bibbs, debuted. On August 13, 2013, Funkmaster Flex released the song "Shame the Devil" featuring Pusha T. On November 26, 2013, the music video was released for "Bury That" featuring Jon Bibbs. On February 16, 2014, the music video was released for "Blasphemy" featuring Fam-Lay.

== Critical response ==
Professional ratings
Review scores
Source	Rating
AllHipHop	9/10
HipHopDX	3.5/5 stars
Spin	5/10
XXL	3/5 stars

Hear Ye Him was met with generally positive reviews from music critics. Matthew Sanderson of AllHipHop gave the album a nine out of ten, saying "Hear Ye Him isn’t too far removed for the old Malice, comprised of introspective flows on the drug game, and its repercussions on one’s self and family. There are no filler hooks here. Rhymes are intelligent and concise, and they cut like a knife. The same high caliber raps Clipse was known for are on this album." Reed Jackson of XXL gave the album an L, saying "Hear Ye Him is also hurt by its production. The beats, no longer full of the synth-laced bounce of Pharrell Williams, are mostly carbon copy affairs. [...] “Still Got Love,” No Malice talks directly to all his former cohorts—Pusha, Pharrell, and even Sandman—and announces with confidence that “everything must come to an end.” Unfortunately, this also could signify the end of the witty punch lines and captivating storytelling that drew listeners to Clipse in the first place."

Ronald Grant of HipHopDX gave the album three and a half stars out of five, saying "...even though No Malice’s candor in owning up to his past as well as pretty much remaining the same guy is commendable and energizing, he hasn’t quite found the perfect equilibrium between the brash, self-assured passion in lyrical delivery of his former self and the more reflective and topical nature of his new Rap persona. Still, with a renewed focus and an ambitious new musical direction, No Malice has created in Hear Ye Him a viable contender for at the least being honorably mentioned as a notable Hip Hop album of 2013. And unlike many of its contemporaries, both fans of Christian Hip Hop and those that steer towards more worldly fare, contradictions and all, can appreciate it." Craig Jenkins of Spin gave the album a five out of ten, saying "The album flashes vital signs only when he eases up on the proselytizing to examine the fallout from a life spent in and around the drug game."

== Track listing ==
No.	Title	Producer(s)	Length
1.	"Illusions (Interlude)"		0:11
2.	"Smoke & Mirrors" (featuring Ab-Liva)	Illmind	3:47
3.	"Blasphemy" (featuring Fam-Lay)	Cam Calloway	2:56
4.	"Ain't Beggin' (Interlude)"		0:08
5.	"Hear Ye Him"	The Profound Sounds	3:33
6.	"Unforgettable" (featuring Life Dutchee)	Grip Productions	3:04
7.	"Cheap Dolla (Interlude)"		0:07
8.	"Bow Down No Mo'"	Nando Pro	3:40
9.	"Refiner's Fire (Interlude)"		0:15
10.	"Shame the Devil" (featuring Pusha T)	S1; Greg Fears Jr.	3:38
11.	"Bury That" (featuring Jon Bibbs)	The Profound Sounds	3:02
12.	"June" (featuring Eric David)	J-Maxx	3:23
13.	"Separate (Interlude)"		0:09
14.	"Still Got Love" (featuring Ishod)	Michael Etheridge	3:55
15.	"Different" (featuring PK Oneday & Bri)	PK Oneday	3:41
16.	"Goin' There (Interlude)"		0:17
17.	"No Time" (featuring Jaeson Ma)	Chad Hugo	7:19
