= Clipse Presents: Re-Up Gang =

Studio album by Re-Up Gang
- Released: August 5, 2008
- Studio: Hovercraft Studios (Virginia Beach, VA)
- Genre: Hip hop
- Length: 49:05
- Label: Re-Up Gang; Koch
- Producer: The Clipse (exec.); Illfonics; Shalom "J.Storm" Miller; Johnny Fuego; Karl Maceo; Scott Storch; The Sleepwalkers; Clinton Sparks

Professional ratings
Aggregate scores
Source	Rating
Metacritic	67/100
Review scores
Source	Rating
AllMusic	3/5 stars
Entertainment Weekly	B+
HipHopDX	2.5/5
Pitchfork	5.6/10
PopMatters	5/10
RapReviews	8/10
Robert Christgau	(2-star Honorable Mention)
Spin	3/5 stars
Tiny Mix Tapes	3/5 marks

Clipse Presents: Re-Up Gang is the only studio album by the American rap group Re-Up Gang. It was released through Re-Up Gang Records and Koch Records. Recording sessions took place at Hovercraft Studios in Virginia Beach, Virginia. Production was handled by The Sleepwalkers, Karl Maceo, Illfonics, Shalom "J.Storm" Miller, Johnny Fuego, and Scott Storch, with the Clipse serving as executive producers. The group had previously appeared on the We Got It 4 Cheap mixtapes. The first single, "Fast Life" featured half of the Re-Up Gang, the Clipse. The album features Clipse and the other two members of the Re-Up Gang, Ab-Liva and Sandman. The album peaked at number 55 on the Billboard 200, number eight on the Top R&B/Hip-Hop Albums, number five on the Top Rap Albums, and number seven on the Independent Albums.

== Track listing ==
No.	Title	Producer(s)	Length
1.	"Re-Up Gang Intro"	The SleepWalkers	4:28
2.	"Million Dollar Corner"	The SleepWalkers	4:29
3.	"Street Money"	Karl Maceo; Shalom "J.Storm" Miller	3:03
4.	"Fast Life"	Scott Storch	4:09
5.	"My Life's the Shit"	Illfonics	3:03
6.	"Bring It Back"	The SleepWalkers	4:08
7.	"Emotionless"	The SleepWalkers	4:47
8.	"We Know"	The SleepWalkers	4:52
9.	"Money"	Karl Maceo; Johnny Fuego	3:36
10.	"Been Thru So Much"	The SleepWalkers	4:46
11.	"Still Got It for Cheap"	Matthew Bang	4:00
12.	"Show You How to Hustle"	The SleepWalkers	3:37
13.	"Zen" (iTunes bonus track)	Clinton Sparks

== Charts ==
Chart (2008)	Peak position
US Billboard 200	55
US Top R&B/Hip-Hop Albums (Billboard)	8
US Top Rap Albums (Billboard)	5
US Independent Albums (Billboard)	7
