= Land 2 Air Chronicles I: Chaos and the Darkness =

EP by Kenna
- Released: April 26, 2011
- Label: Godel
- Producers: Kenna; Chad Hugo

Kenna chronology
Make Sure They See My Face (2007)	Land 2 Air Chronicles I: Chaos and the Darkness (2011)	Land 2 Air Chronicles II: Imitation Is Suicide Chapter 1 (2013)

Singles from Land 2 Air Chronicles I: Chaos and the Darkness
- 1. "Chains" Released: March 8, 2011

Land 2 Air Chronicles I: Chaos and the Darkness is an EP by American singer-songwriter Kenna. It was released in 2011.

== Track listing ==
Land 2 Air Chronicles I: Chaos And The Darkness
No.	Title	Length
1.	"Chains"	3:47
2.	"Kharma Is Coming"	3:20
3.	"What U Want"	3:39
Total length:		10:46

== Personnel ==
- Kenna - Vocals, Writing, Producer
- Chad Hugo - Producer
