= Land 2 Air Chronicles II: Imitation Is Suicide Chapter 2 =

Land 2 Air Chronicles II: Imitation Is Suicide – Chapter 2

EP by Kenna
- Released: October 22, 2013
- Length: 12:40
- Label: Dim Mak

Kenna chronology
Land 2 Air Chronicles II: Imitation Is Suicide Chapter 1 (2013)	Land 2 Air Chronicles II: Imitation Is Suicide – Chapter 2 (2013)	Land 2 Air Chronicles II: Imitation Is Suicide Chapter 3 (2013)

Singles from Land 2 Air Chronicles II: Imitation Is Suicide Chapter 2
- 1. "Long Gone" Released: October 16, 2012; 2. "Love Is Still Alive" Released: October 17, 2013

Land 2 Air Chronicles II: Imitation Is Suicide Chapter 2 is an EP by American singer-songwriter Kenna. It is the second of three EPs in the Land 2 Air Chronicles II series, released from September 2013 to December 2013.

== Track listing ==
Land 2 Air Chronicles II: Imitation Is Suicide Chapter 2
No.	Title	Length
1.	"Long Gone"	5:03
2.	"Heaviness"	3:49
3.	"Love Is Still Alive"	3:48
Total length:		12:40
