= Land 2 Air Chronicles II: Imitation Is Suicide Chapter 3 =

Land 2 Air Chronicles II: Imitation Is Suicide – Chapter 3

EP by Kenna
- Released: December 3, 2013
- Length: 12:57
- Label: Dim Mak
- Producer: RJD2

Kenna chronology
Land 2 Air Chronicles II: Imitation Is Suicide Chapter 2 (2013)	Land 2 Air Chronicles II: Imitation Is Suicide – Chapter 3 (2013)

Singles from Land 2 Air Chronicles II: Imitation Is Suicide Chapter 3
- 1. "How Will It End" Released: December 3, 2013

Land 2 Air Chronicles II: Imitation Is Suicide Chapter 3 is an EP by American singer-songwriter Kenna. It is the third, and final, EP in the Land 2 Air Chronicles II series, released from September 2013 to December 2013.

== Track listing ==
Land 2 Air Chronicles II: Imitation Is Suicide Chapter 3
No.	Title	Length
1.	"Imitation Is Suicide"	3:00
2.	"How Will It End"	3:58
3.	"Politics"	5:59
Total length:		12:57

== Production ==
Co-producer – RJD2
