= New Sacred Cow =

Studio album by Kenna
- Released: June 10, 2003
- Recorded: 1999–2002
- Length: 52:29
- Label: Columbia CK 86959
- Producers: Kenna; Chase Chad

Kenna chronology
New Sacred Cow (2003)	The Black Goodbye EP (2007)

Singles from New Sacred Cow
- 1. "Hell Bent" Released: August 31, 2001; 2. "Freetime" Released: April 22, 2003; 3. "Sunday After You" Released: December 14, 2004

Professional ratings
Review scores
Source	Rating
AllMusic	4/5 stars
Prefix Magazine	(3/5)
PopMatters	(Favorable)
Rolling Stone	3/5 stars
Slant Magazine	4.5/5 stars

New Sacred Cow is the debut studio album by American singer-songwriter Kenna, released on June 10, 2003, by Columbia Records. The album was produced by Chad Hugo of The Neptunes and Kenna. Kenna created something of an underground buzz with the release of his first single "Hell Bent" in 2001. The album was leaked to the internet over a year before its final release, as it was delayed by record company politics. "Freetime" was chosen as the single to lead off the release of the album. A video was shot, and appeared sporadically on MTV2 along with the video for "Hell Bent". "Freetime" peaked at No. 19 on the Billboard Hot Dance Club Play chart. In late 2004, "Sunday After You" was remixed by Chad Hugo and released as a single. The single version differs greatly from the album version.

== Track listing ==
New Sacred Cow
No.	Title	Writer(s)	Producer(s)	Length
1.	"Within Earshot"	Kenna; Chad Hugo	Kenna; Chase Chad	1:20
2.	"Freetime"	Kenna; Hugo	Kenna; Chad	3:23
3.	"Man Fading"	Kenna; Hugo	Kenna; Chad	4:05
4.	"Sunday After You"	Kenna; Hugo	Kenna; Chad	4:16
5.	"Vexed and Glorious / A Better Control"	Kenna; Hugo	Kenna; Chad	6:13
6.	"Red Man"	Kenna; Hugo	Kenna; Chad	3:39
7.	"Hell Bent"	Kenna; Hugo	Kenna; Chad	4:53
8.	"Yeneh Ababa (Rose)"	Kenna	Kenna	3:13
9.	"War in Me"	Kenna	Kenna	5:20
10.	"New Sacred Cow"	Kenna; Hugo	Kenna; Chad	4:01
11.	"I'm Gone"	Kenna; Hugo	Kenna; Chad	3:54
12.	"Siren"	Kenna; Hugo	Kenna; Chad	3:38
13.	"Love/Hate Sensation"	Kenna	Kenna	4:34
Total length:				52:29

== Release and reception ==
On the CD, "Vexed and Glorious" and "A Better Control" are placed on the same track, as a hidden interlude. "Yeneh Ababa (Rose)", "War in Me", and "Love/Hate Sensation" were produced by Kenna himself, while all other songs were produced with Chad Hugo on co-production duties.

Promo copies of "New Sacred Cow" surfaced over a year before the album's release, with a slightly different track order. The song "Siren" did not appear until the official release of the album.

A music video to the stop motion short film More to the song of "Hell Bent" was aired on MTV2 in 2001, and the Toonami Midnight Run. It was created and directed by one of the future directors of Kung Fu Panda, Mark Osbourne.

== Personnel ==
- Kenna – lead vocals, keyboards, production, graphics, all lyrics
- Chad Hugo – keyboards, saxophone, instruments, production, all lyrics (tracks: 1–7, 10–12)
- David Davidson – string arrangements
- Ethan Johns – bass (New Scared Cow)
- Otto Price – bass (Red Man, War In Me)
- Pui Tse – graphics
- Sean Murphy – photography
- Serban Ghenea – engineer, mixing
- John Haynes – engineer
- Matt Pinfield – A&R
