= Kenna =

American singer

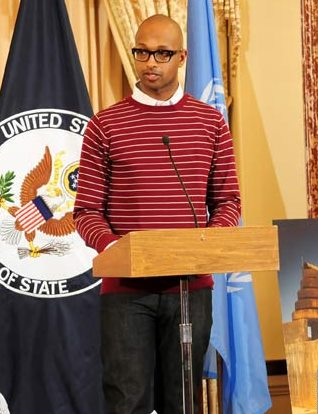
- Kenna at a U.S. Department of State reception honoring his Summit on the Summit initiative.

Background information
- Born: Kenna Zemedkun; October 30, 1978 (age 48); Addis Ababa, Ethiopia
- Genres: Alternative rock; electronic
- Occupations: Singer-songwriter; musician; producer
- Instruments: Vocals; keyboards
- Years active: 2001–present
- Labels: Columbia; Interscope; Star Trak; Godel; Dim Mak; RCA
- Website: kna.art

Kenna Zemedkun, known professionally as Kenna, is an Ethiopian-born American musician and philanthropist. His track "Say Goodbye to Love" was nominated for Best Urban/Alternative Performance in the 2009 Grammy Awards. Kenna is the founder and producer of the Summit on the Summit clean water initiative, and also partnered with Justin Timberlake to re-imagine the social network Myspace before Time Inc. purchased it.

== Personal life ==
Kenna was born in Addis Ababa, Ethiopia, where he was raised by his grandfather for the first three years of his life. His parents had escaped persecution and immigrated to England and later America; Kenna reunited with them in Cincinnati, Ohio when he was three years old.

He was later raised in Virginia Beach, Virginia, attending school with friends and eventual career-long collaborators Chad Hugo and Pharrell Williams. Kenna began to express an interest in music upon receiving a copy of U2's The Joshua Tree. The album inspired Kenna to teach himself piano while studying singers like Stevie Wonder and Marvin Gaye, as well as groups like The Cure and Duran Duran. Breaking into the music scene at such a young age and at an interesting time in pop history, Kenna met some of music's biggest names including Whitney Houston, Babyface, Blackstreet, Teddy Riley and Michael Jackson.

He was featured in Canadian journalist Malcolm Gladwell's book, Blink: The Power of Thinking Without Thinking.

== Career ==
=== New Sacred Cow ===
With the release of his first single in 2001, "Hell Bent", Kenna gained moderate popularity and an underground following of fans who eagerly awaited the release of his debut album, New Sacred Cow. After many delays and swapping of record labels, the album was finally released under the Sony imprint Columbia Records in 2003. A subsequent North American tour was launched in the Summer of 2003 with Depeche Mode front man Dave Gahan.

The album, which was co-produced by Chad Hugo of The Neptunes, contained elements of electronica, synthpop, post-rock, and house music. Two singles, "Sunday After You" and "Freetime" followed the release of the album; the music video of the latter, along with "Hell Bent", appeared sporadically on MTV2. "Freetime" reached #19 on the U.S. Dance charts.

In Malcolm Gladwell's book Blink, which is about the way people judge and make decisions in their lives, a portion of one chapter focuses on the stops, starts, and difficulties that Kenna experienced in getting his music accepted by the general public, despite the tremendous reception and enthusiasm that music executives, other musicians and a small, loyal fan base had when they heard his music.

=== Make Sure They See My Face ===
Kenna's second album, entitled Make Sure They See My Face, also co-produced by Hugo, was written over the course of three years, finishing in early 2007. The album was originally set to be released on June 5, 2007, then pushed back to June 19, 2007, finally being released on October 16, 2007. Kenna, in an interview with Vibe magazine, cited the reason for delays as being over the video for the album's debut single. The inspiration for the album came from Kenna's attempt to climb Mount Kilimanjaro, the title, inspired from phone calls by Pharrell asking Kenna; "are you going to make sure they see your face?". Kenna's climb took him to 18,200 feet before he fell ill from taking a sulfur-based altitude medicine, to which he had an unknown allergy. On October 23, 2007, the album debuted at #1 on the Billboard Top 20 Heatseekers Chart.

An unrelated song from his second album, "Face the Gun", was released to appease his waiting fans, and initially was not to appear on Make Sure They See My Face, missing from early promos of the album. Ultimately, it was included in the final track listing. Kenna released a track from the album, entitled "Better Wise Up", in time for the Super Bowl.

=== Land 2 Air Chronicles and Songs for Flight ===
On February 13, 2011, Kenna announced plans over Facebook and Twitter to release a series of 3 EPs with 3 songs each, titled the Land 2 Air Chronicles, which will serve as the "runway" to his third album to be titled Songs for Flight, described by Kenna as a "first ever musical journey."

The first EP, titled Chaos and the Darkness, was scheduled to be released on March 8, preceded by the first single "Chains". The song was streamed on Kenna's official website on February 22. On March 4, it was announced that there had been an unfortunate technical failure with the hard drive that stored the majority of the files that made up the songs for the EP and the album. Kenna rerecorded and reproduced all the songs, reworking the concept for the entire series. Chaos and the Darkness was eventually released on April 26, 2011, with "Chains" being available as a single on iTunes & Amazon on March 8.

The second volume of the Land 2 Air Chronicles series saw its release spanning three EPs, titled Imitation is Suicide Chapter I, Chapter II and Chapter III, respectively. Four singles would accompany their release, including "Relations (An Ode To You And Me)", "Long Gone", "Love Is Still Alive" and "How Will It End?". All of them have an accompanying music video, with the exception of "How Will It End?". The video accompanying "Long Gone" was filmed in an Hitchcockian-style and also marks Kenna's directorial debut. It was released on MTV on October 17, 2012. Additionally, a remix to "Relations" featuring Childish Gambino was released on November 12, 2013.

Kenna announced the third and final volume, to be called Genius. A demo of a track from the EP called "Something to Break" was streamed on Kenna's SoundCloud and social media pages.

A single titled,"Sleep When We Die", was released on July 15, 2015. It premiered on Zane Lowe's Beats 1 Radio show on Apple Music, and was subsequently released for digital download.

=== Other works ===
On October 6, 2006, the world premiere of the song "Out of Control (State of Emotion)", from Kenna's EP entitled Black Goodbye Ride, was played on East Village Radio on Authentic Shit with Mark Ronson; it became available on iTunes on December 19, 2006.

On July 7, 2007, Kenna opened the New Jersey portion of the Live Earth concert. He also toured with Nelly Furtado throughout various stops on her "Loose" tour.

Kenna has also worked with Lupe Fiasco on the remix of "Say Goodbye to Love", and The Cool Kids on the remix of "Loose Wires."

"Out of Control" appears in the soundtrack for the video games MLB 08 The Show and FIFA 08.

The track "Loose Wires" from Make Sure They See My Face was included in the soundtrack for the movie Fast and Furious in 2009, along with a collection of other Pharrell Williams produced songs.

Kenna and Chad Hugo produced the track "Pretty Please" for JoJo's 2010 mixtape Can't Take That Away from Me.

Kenna was also a featured celebrity in the HP You on You project advertisement.

"Never Let Me Down", an unreleased track from the Make Sure They See My Face sessions, was released on the charity album Download to Donate for Haiti in 2010, in which the proceeds go to Music for Relief, Linkin Park's charity. This album also contains "Resurrection", a collaboration with Lupe Fiasco, which was accompanied by a music video.

Kenna also appears along with Pharrell Williams in the music video for their collaboration with Clipse, "Life Change".

In 2010, Kenna and Chad Hugo worked with Kid Cudi on a track unofficially titled "Capcom!" for a Street Fighter game. It was never officially released, but was streamed on the internet the following year.

In 2013, Kenna released a cover of the U2 song "Gloria" to his SoundCloud and Myspace pages, as a way to reach out to Bono, one of his biggest musical influences. He received a call from Bono shortly thereafter.

In 2016, he released “Live Like This (Go Live)” with Vic Mensa to commemorate the introduction of Twitter’s live feature. This marked the first instance of him releasing music under the name KNA, with him also being credited as such on “Fever” by RAC and his own track “Use Me (Only For The Summer)”, released 2017 and 2018, respectively.

== Other ventures ==
=== Summit on the Summit ===
When Kenna learned about the global water crisis affecting even his home village in Ethiopia, he decided to create the SUMMIT ON THE SUMMIT project, when he and friends Lupe Fiasco, Jessica Biel, Emile Hirsch and others climbed Mt. Kilimanjaro on January 7, 2010 to bring attention to the water crisis. The documentary on the climb aired on MTV on March 14, 2010.

A new song called "Turn" was made available as a free download on his official MySpace for a limited time. It has since been released on the iTunes Store on January 26, 2010. Proceeds from the sales of the track are donated to the SUMMIT ON THE SUMMIT project.

=== Myspace ===
After some urging from friend and fellow musician Justin Timberlake, who also invested in the new Myspace, Kenna took a job as Chief Vision Officer in the company. Kenna was featured in the April 2013 Details Magazine issue as one of their 2013 "Digital Mavericks" entrepreneurs.

=== Translator ===
Kenna's strategic development company Translator serves as the umbrella for all of Kenna's endeavors, including his music, technology and philanthropic efforts. In March 2012, Translator in partnership with Myspace produced a successful outdoor concert featuring Edward Sharpe and the Magnetic Zeros and Mumford & Sons at the annual South by Southwest Festival in Austin, Texas. The event saw more than 12,000 attendees and 1.3 million livestream views on Myspace. Kenna continues to curate and consult on many projects in tandem with his own music endeavors.

== Discography ==
=== Studio albums ===
- New Sacred Cow (2003)
- Make Sure They See My Face (2007)
- No One (2026)

=== EPs ===
- The Black Goodbye EP (2007)
- Land 2 Air Chronicles I: Chaos and the Darkness (2011)
- Land 2 Air Chronicles II: Imitation Is Suicide Chapter 1 (2013)
- Land 2 Air Chronicles II: Imitation Is Suicide Chapter 2 (2013)
- Land 2 Air Chronicles II: Imitation Is Suicide Chapter 3 (2013)

=== Singles ===
==== As Kenna ====
List of singles as lead artist, showing year released and album name
Title	Year	Album
"Hell Bent"	2001	New Sacred Cow
"Freetime"	2003	New Sacred Cow
"Sunday After You (Burning Down Mix)"	2004	Non-album single
"Out of Control (State Of Emotion)"	2006	Make Sure They See My Face
"Say Goodbye To Love"	2007	Make Sure They See My Face
"Turn"	2010	Non-album single
"Chains"	2011	Land 2 Air Chronicles I: Chaos and the Darkness
"Long Gone"	2012	Land 2 Air Chronicles II: Imitation Is Suicide Chapter 2
"Relations (An Ode To You and Me)"	2013	Land 2 Air Chronicles II: Imitation Is Suicide Chapter 1
"Love Is Still Alive"	2013	Land 2 Air Chronicles II: Imitation Is Suicide Chapter 2
"How Will It End"	2013	Land 2 Air Chronicles II: Imitation Is Suicide Chapter 3
"Sleep When We Die"	2015	Non-album single

==== As KNA ====
Title	Year	Album
"Use Me (Only For The Summer)" (as K-N-A)	2018	Non-album single
"Listen"	2025	Non-album single
"I'm Coming Home"	2025	Non-album single
"Architect"	2026	No One

=== Guest appearances ===
List of non-single guest appearances, with other performing artists, showing year released and album name
Title	Year	Other artist(s)	Album
"Red to Black"	2005	Fort Minor feat. Jonah Matranga and Styles of Beyond	The Rising Tied
"The Hard Way"	2005	Fort Minor	The Rising Tied
"Spiral"	2006	William Orbit feat. Sugababes	Hello Waveforms
"My Party" (Remix with Chad Hugo)	2007	Kings of Leon	Charmer
"Last Transmission II"	2007	Mae	Singularity
"Novocaine"	2007	Mae	Singularity
"Amy" (Ryan Adams cover)	2007	Mark Ronson	Version
"Bittersweet World"	2008	Ashlee Simpson	Bittersweet World
"C'est Ecrit"	2008	Futur Proche	Par Tous Les Temps Volume 2
"Summertime"	2008	Wiley	See Clear Now
"Lock It Up"	2009	Chad Hugo	—N/a
"Life Change"	2009	Clipse	Til the Casket Drops
"Resurrection"	2010	Lupe Fiasco	Download to Donate for Haiti
"Games You Can Win"	2010	RJD2	The Colossus
"Fear & Doubt"	2013	Vic Mensa	Innanetape
"Fever"	2017	RAC	Ego
