= Make Sure They See My Face =

Studio album by Kenna
- Released: October 16, 2007
- Label: Interscope; Star Trak
- Producer: The Neptunes; Kenna

Kenna chronology
The Black Goodbye EP (2007)	Make Sure They See My Face (2007)	Land 2 Air Chronicles I: Chaos and the Darkness (2011)

Singles from Make Sure They See My Face
- 1. "Out of Control (State of Emotion)" Released: December 19, 2006; 2. "Say Goodbye to Love" Released: August 21, 2007

Professional ratings
Review scores
Source	Rating
Allmusic	4/5 stars
musicOMH	2/5 stars
Pitchfork Media	6.4/10
PopMatters	8/10
Rolling Stone	3/5 stars
The Skinny	3/5 stars
Slant Magazine	3.5/5 stars

Make Sure They See My Face is the second studio album by American singer-songwriter Kenna. It was released on October 16, 2007, via Interscope and Star Trak labels. The record includes two singles.

== Recording ==
Recording for the album took place at: Virginia Beach (Hovercraft Studios, Mixstar Studio), Norfolk (Lopside Studios), Los Angeles (The Record Plant), Studio City (Ringside Studios), New York (Allido Studios), London (Whitfield Street Studios)

== Background ==
The inspiration for the album came from Kenna's attempt to climb Mount Kilimanjaro, the title, inspired from a phone calls by Neptunes' Pharrell Williams asking Kenna; "are you going make sure they see your face?". Kenna's Kilimanjaro climb took him to 18,200 feet before he fell ill from taking a sulfur-based altitude medicine, one he was unaware he was allergic to.

Upon the album's British release in May 2008, Kenna told noted UK R&B writer Pete Lewis of the award-winning Blues & Soul: "I actually went in to make an album that unifies all walks. As a person I've always been between worlds. I've always had to be someone who adapts, someone who's a chameleon of sorts. So vocally, musically spiritually, and in my life I've constantly tended to approach things with the idea of just bringing things together and not limiting myself whatsoever. So musically that's what this record is to me - a fusion of all worlds and a unifier."

== Singles ==
"Out of Control (State of Emotion)" was released as the lead single of the album on December 19, 2006. "Say Goodbye to Love" was released on August 21, 2007.

== Accolades ==
The first single "Say Goodbye to Love" was nominated for a Grammy in the Best Alternative R&B Performance Category.

== Track listing ==
All songs produced by The Neptunes and Kenna.

No.	Title	Writer(s)	Length
1.	"Daylight"	Kenna; Chad Hugo	4:26
2.	"Out of Control (State of Emotion)"	Kenna; Hugo	4:02
3.	"Loose Wires / Blink Radio"	Kenna; Pharrell Williams	4:40
4.	"Say Goodbye to Love"	Kenna; Williams	3:12
5.	"Sun Red Sky Blue"	Kenna; Hugo	4:05
6.	"Baptized in Blacklight"	Kenna; Hugo	4:08
7.	"Static"	Kenna	4:50
8.	"Phantom Always" (featuring Justin Timberlake)	Kenna; Hugo; Timberlake	4:38
9.	"Face the Gun / Good Luck"	Kenna; Hugo	5:34
10.	"Better Wise Up"	Kenna; Hugo	3:58
11.	"Be Still"	Kenna	4:05
12.	"Wide Awake"	Kenna; Hugo	4:17

US iTunes Store bonus track
No.	Title	Writer(s)	Length
13.	"Down"	Kenna; Williams	3:10

UK bonus tracks
No.	Title	Writer(s)	Length
13.	"Big Lights"	Williams; Kenna	4:05
14.	"Rockaway Life" (featuring Justin Timberlake)	Hugo; Kenna; Timberlake	3:57

== Release history ==
Country	Date	Label
Canada	October 16, 2007	Universal Music Group
United States	October 16, 2007	Interscope Records
United Kingdom	May 12, 2008	Polydor Group

== Credits ==
- Kenna - lead vocals, production, executive producer, songwriting
- The Neptunes - production, instruments
- Chad Hugo - songwriting (tracks: 1, 2, 5, 6, 8–10, 12)
- Pharrell Williams - songwriting (tracks: 3, 4)
- Chester Kamen - additional guitar (tracks: 1, 8, 9, 11)
- Damon Crawford - drums (tracks: 2)
- Patrick Matera - guitar (tracks: 2)
- Kenna, Morningbreath - art direction, design
- Danny Betancourt - engineering
- Ali, Andrew Coleman, Anthony Kilhoffer, John Hanes, Richard Reitz, Scott Thomas, Scott Wilson, Tim Roberts - additional engineering
- Chris Gehringer - mastering
- Serban Ghenea - mixing
- Michael Muller - photography (tracks: 2)
