= Clones (album) =

The Neptunes Present... Clones

Compilation album by The Neptunes
- Released: August 19, 2003
- Recorded: 2002–2003
- Genres: Hip hop; R&B; rock
- Length: 63:34
- Labels: Star Trak; Arista
- Producer: The Neptunes

Singles from The Neptunes Present... Clones
- 1. "Hot Damn" Released: April 29, 2003; 2. "Frontin'" Released: June 3, 2003; 3. "Popular Thug" Released: July 14, 2003; 4. "Light Your Ass on Fire" Released: July 22, 2003; 5. "Rock 'n' Roll" Released: September 30, 2003; 6. "It Blows My Mind" Released: 2003

The Neptunes Present... Clones is the only compilation album produced and released by American production duo The Neptunes (Pharrell Williams and Chad Hugo). It was released on August 19, 2003 and has been certified Gold by the RIAA. The album featured six singles; "Frontin'" by Pharrell Williams, "Popular Thug" by Kelis, "Light Your Ass on Fire" by Busta Rhymes, "Rock 'n' Roll" by Fam-Lay, "Hot Damn" by Clipse and "It Blows My Mind" by Snoop Dogg.

Professional ratings
Review scores
Source	Rating
AllMusic	3.5/5 stars
RapReviews	(7/10)
Rolling Stone	4/5 stars
USA Today	3.5/4 stars
Vibe	3.5/5 stars

== Commercial performance ==
The album debuted at number one on the US Billboard 200 chart, with first-week sales of 250,000 copies in the United States. In its second week, the album fell to number three on the Billboard 200, selling 115,000 copies. In its third week, Clones fell to number six on the US chart with 81,000 copies, for a three-week total of 450,000 units. The album sold over 500,000 domestically, and has been certified Gold by the RIAA.

== Track listing ==
All tracks produced by the Neptunes, except where noted.

Clones track listing
No.	Title	Writer(s)	Performer(s)	Length
1.	"Intro"			0:26
2.	"Light Your Ass on Fire" (featuring Pharrell Williams)	Chad Hugo; Pharrell Williams; Trevor Smith	Busta Rhymes	3:39
3.	"Blaze of Glory" (featuring Pharrell Williams and Ab-Liva)	Hugo; Williams; Gene Thornton; Rennard East; Terrence Thornton	Clipse	3:51
4.	"It Wasn't Us" (featuring I-20)	Hugo; Williams; Bobby Sandimanie; Christopher Bridges	Ludacris	3:34
5.	"Frontin'" (featuring Jay-Z)	Hugo; Williams; Shawn Carter	Pharrell Williams	3:56
6.	"Good Girl"	Hugo; Williams	Vanessa Marquez	4:10
7.	"If"	Hugo; Williams; Cornell Haynes	Nelly	3:40
8.	"Hot" (featuring Boo-Bonic and Pusha T)	Hugo; Williams; T. Thornton; Al Holly; Amin Porter	Rosco P. Coldchain	3:36
9.	"It Blows My Mind"	Hugo; Williams; Calvin Broadus	Snoop Dogg	4:59
10.	"Half-Steering..." (produced by Alex Oana)	John Ostby	Spymob	3:34
11.	"Fuck N' Spend" (produced by Dana Gumbiner and the High Speed Scene)	Max Hart	The High Speed Scene	1:27
12.	"Loser" (featuring Clipse)	Hugo; Williams; G. Thornton; T. Thornton; Shay Haley	N.E.R.D.	3:11
13.	"Rock N' Roll"	Hugo; Williams; Nathaniel Johnson	Fam-Lay	4:19
14.	"The Don of Dons (Put De Ting Pon Dem)" (featuring Jadakiss)	Hugo; Williams; Jason Phillips; William Maragh	Super Cat	4:10
15.	"Hot Damn" (featuring Ab-Liva, Pharrell Williams and Rosco P. Coldchain)	Hugo; Williams; G. Thornton; T. Thornton; Bryan Williams	Clipse	4:03
16.	"Put 'Em Up" (featuring Pharrell Williams)	Hugo; Williams; Victor Santiago	N.O.R.E.	3:31
17.	"Pop Shit" (featuring Pharrell Williams)	Hugo; Williams; Russell Jones	Ol' Dirty Bastard	3:34
18.	"Popular Thug" (featuring Nas)	Hugo; Williams; Nasir Jones	Kelis	3:54
Total length:				1:03:34

== Credits ==
- Executive producers – Pharrell Williams, and Chad Hugo for Star Trak Entertainment
- All tracks produced by The Neptunes
- Pharrell Williams – keyboards, synthesizers, programming, mixing
- Chad Hugo – keyboards, synthesizers, sequencer, mixing

== Charts ==
=== Weekly charts ===
Weekly chart performance for Clones
Chart (2003)	Peak position
Australian Albums (ARIA)	53
Belgian Albums (Ultratop Flanders)	24
Canadian Albums (Billboard)	7
Dutch Albums (Album Top 100)	1
Finnish Albums (Suomen virallinen lista)	34
French Albums (SNEP)	52
German Albums (Offizielle Top 100)	22
Norwegian Albums (VG-lista)	7
Swedish Albums (Sverigetopplistan)	29
Swiss Albums (Schweizer Hitparade)	27
UK Compilation Albums (Official Charts)	56
UK R&B Albums (Official Charts)	1
US Billboard 200	1
US Top R&B/Hip-Hop Albums (Billboard)	1

=== Year-end charts ===
Year-end chart performance for Clones
Chart (2003)	Position
Dutch Albums (Album Top 100)	86
US Billboard 200	90
US Top R&B/Hip-Hop Albums (Billboard)	41

== Certifications ==
Region	Certification	Certified units/sales
United States (RIAA)	Gold	500,000^{^}
^{^} Shipments figures based on certification alone.

== See also ==
- List of UK R&B Albums Chart number ones of 2003
- List of Billboard 200 number-one albums of 2003
- List of Billboard number-one R&B/Hip-Hop albums of 2003
