= Land 2 Air Chronicles II: Imitation Is Suicide Chapter 1 =

Land 2 Air Chronicles II: Imitation Is Suicide – Chapter 1

EP by Kenna
- Released: September 3, 2013
- Length: 13:23
- Label: Dim Mak
- Producers: Kenna; Chad Hugo

Kenna chronology
Land 2 Air Chronicles I: Chaos and the Darkness (2011)	Land 2 Air Chronicles II: Imitation Is Suicide – Chapter 1 (2013)	Land 2 Air Chronicles II: Imitation Is Suicide Chapter 2 (2013)

Singles from Land 2 Air Chronicles II: Imitation Is Suicide Chapter 1
- 1. "Relations (An Ode to You and Me)" Released: August 13, 2013

Land 2 Air Chronicles II: Imitation Is Suicide Chapter 1 is an EP by American singer-songwriter Kenna. It is the first of three EPs in the Land 2 Air Chronicles II series, released from September 2013 to December 2013. "Relations (An Ode to You and Me)" was released as a single to promote the EP. A remix featuring Childish Gambino was released on November 12.

== Track listing ==
Land 2 Air Chronicles II: Imitation Is Suicide Chapter 1
No.	Title	Length
1.	"Wild, Wild Life"	3:16
2.	"Relations (An Ode to You and Me)"	4:25
3.	"Get in Closer"	5:42
Total length:		13:23

== Personnel ==
Producer – Chad Hugo, Kenna
