= Re-Up Gang =

American hip-hop group

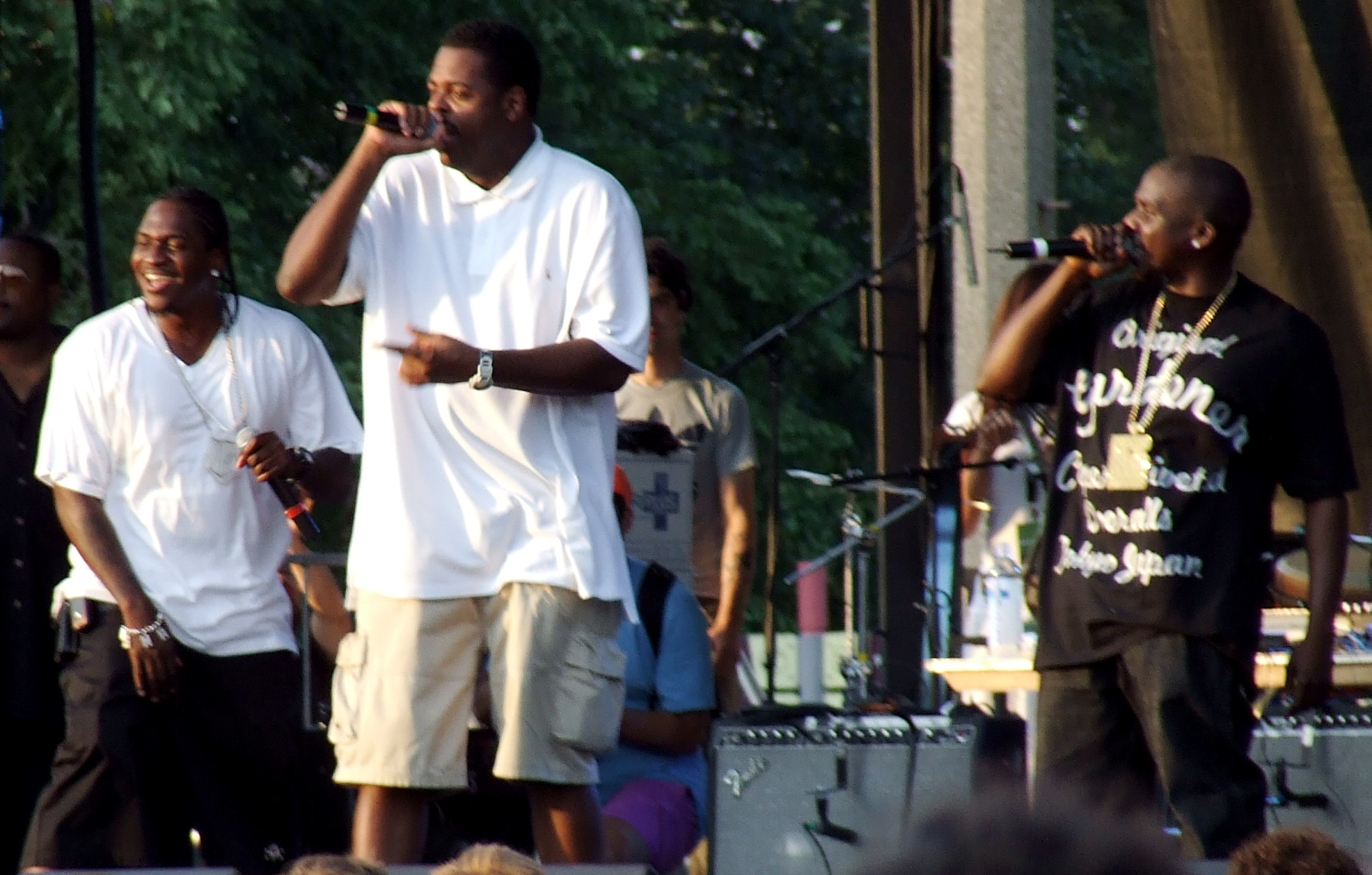

Background information
- Origin: Virginia Beach, Virginia, U.S.
- Genres: Hip-hop
- Years active: 2004–2010
- Label: Re-Up
- Spinoff of: Clipse
- Past members: No Malice; Pusha T Ab-Liva; Sandman

The Re-Up Gang was an American hip-hop group formed in 2004, in Virginia Beach, Virginia. The group was formed by Pusha T and Malice, brothers and members of Virginia-based hip-hop duo Clipse, alongside Philadelphia-based rappers Rennard "Ab-Liva" East and Sandman. The Re-Up Gang is perhaps best known for their signature We Got It 4 Cheap mixtape series.

== History ==
The Re-Up Gang was created in early 2004, during Clipse's long hiatus between their first and second albums. The group included Clipse themselves, as well as long-time friends Ab-Liva of Major Figgas and Sandman. Pusha T is credited with founding the group, and was responsible for enlisting the help of mixtape DJ Clinton Sparks to put together their first mixtape in an ongoing series, We Got It 4 Cheap: Vol. 1. While a Re-Up Gang album was planned, no specifics had been released at the time due to Clipse's legal issues with Jive Records. On August 5, 2008 (UK: September 8, 2008) the group released their only album on Koch Records titled Clipse Presents: Re-Up Gang. The album featured nine new songs and three unreleased remixes from We Got It 4 Cheap Vol. III. Rapper Pusha T said:

"Everything happens for a reason. We put out the We Got It 4 Cheap series on our own for the streets and that helped keep us visible and build the Re-Up name as an entity ... This time, [our manager] Tony Draper got with [Koch General Manager] Alan Grunblatt to put together an official album with new music and let Koch Records do what they do best. This release gives us something fresh in the marketplace to reward Re-Up fans while we continue to work on the Clipse album."

In an interview with HipHopDX, Sandman stated the Re-Up Gang's album had been mishandled. Although there is no animosity between him and the three members, he is now pursuing a solo career. Sandman and Liva still remain in close contact as they always have. The remaining three members are all pursuing solo careers with No Malice releasing his solo titled album Hear Ye Him in August 2013 and with Pusha dropping his critically acclaimed My Name Is My Name album in October 2013. Pusha T was on Kanye's G.O.O.D Music label before leaving the label in 2022 due to Kanye's antisemitic comments, while No Malice has been focused on his new life making music with a new direction.

== Discography ==
=== Studio albums ===
- 2008: Clipse Presents: Re-Up Gang

=== Mixtapes ===
- 2004: We Got It 4 Cheap: Vol. 1: Introducing The Re-Up Gang
- 2005: We Got It 4 Cheap: Vol. 2: The Black Card Era
- 2008: We Got It 4 Cheap: Vol. 3: The Spirit of Competition
- 2008: The Saga Continues - The Official Mixtape - Remixed & Remastered
