= Star Trak Entertainment =

American record label

- Parent company: Universal Music Group
- Founded: 2001; 25 years ago 2025; 1 year ago (relaunch)
- Founder: The Neptunes; Rob Walker
- Defunct: 2015; 11 years ago (original)
- Status: Active
- Distributors: Interscope Geffen A&M (United States); Polydor (United Kingdom)
- Genre: Various
- Country of origin: United States
- Location: Virginia Beach, Virginia, U.S.
- Official website: startrak.io

Star Trak Entertainment is an American record label, founded by the Neptunes and Rob Walker in 2001. It was launched as an imprint of Arista Records, a subsidiary of Sony Music Entertainment from its formation until 2003, after which it operated under Virgin Records, a subsidiary of EMI, and ultimately Interscope Geffen A&M Records, following EMI's merger with Universal Music Group. The label ceased operations in 2015, but was quietly relaunched ten years later by Rob Walker. Its name is a reference to the 1960s TV program Star Trek.

== History ==
=== Beginnings ===
Star Trak was formed in 2001 by the Neptunes. The label was partially funded by Arista Records (from Bertelsmann Music Group) in a joint-venture. Pharrell Williams would sign longtime friends, Clipse. Their debut album, Lord Willin', was released in 2002 led by the hits, "Grindin'", "When the Last Time", and "Ma, I Don't Love Her" After the success of the album, the label would sign Kelis, Vanessa Marquez, Fam-Lay, N.E.R.D and pop rock band Spymob, who provided backing instruments for N.E.R.D's debut album In Search Of.... The label released a compilation album during the summer of 2003, entitled, The Neptunes Present... Clones. In late 2003, Star Trak Entertainment released the highly successful album, Tasty, by Kelis led by the hit single "Milkshake." In early 2004, Star Trak linked with EMI's Virgin Records for a new distribution deal. The first release from this deal was Fly or Die by N.E.R.D.

=== Addition of Snoop Dogg ===
In mid-2004, Star Trak signed EMI cousin label, Doggystyle Records to a distribution deal and soared to new heights behind veteran Doggystyle Records rapper, Snoop Dogg. A few months later, Star Trak Entertainment left EMI's Virgin Records before completing a year with the label. They ended up moving operations over to Geffen Records and Interscope Records. Here, they would release Snoop Dogg's album, R&G (Rhythm & Gangsta): The Masterpiece. The album was led by "Drop It Like Its Hot", which would be yet another hit single for the fledgling label. This album would go Platinum in the US like some other Star Trak Entertainment releases. It also had many other hit singles. After the album's release, the label was in a surplus and could afford to spend money on new things, so they signed underground Houston, Texas rapper Slim Thug. In 2005, he released his debut album, Already Platinum. This album would give Star Trak Entertainment yet another hit, "Like A Boss", and "I Ain't Heard of That."

=== Decline ===
After the release of Slim Thug's album, Geffen Records was partially absorbed into Interscope, which moved Star Trak into an exclusive distribution deal with Interscope and ended all business with Geffen as Snoop Dogg stayed and took his Doggy Style imprint with him. During this time, the label added Kenna and Robin Thicke to their roster.

=== Resurgence ===
In 2006, Pharrell released his debut solo album, In My Mind. The album provided another two hits for the label and capitalized what is the Neptunes sound. These singles were "Can I Have It Like That", with Gwen Stefani, and "Number One", with Kanye West. Other releases in 2006 were Robin Thicke's second album, The Evolution of Robin Thicke, which featured the hit, "Lost Without U." The last 2006 release was Clipse's second album, Hell Hath No Fury, the album featured another hit for the label, "Mr. Me Too." This was their first release through their Re-Up Gang Records imprint. Because of constant delays on the album's release date, and a small amount of production, then low record sales, Clipse asked for their release from the Jive Records label with in terms released them from Star Trak Entertainment moving their Re-Up Gang Records imprint to Columbia Records. Star Trak Entertainment has since signed Teyana Taylor to their roster, along with Chester French, Natasha Ramos, Epoch When and Sergio Veneno. In 2007, Kenna released his album, Make Sure They See My Face. Releases for 2008 included N.E.R.D and Robin Thicke. Releases for 2009 included Chester French, Teyana Taylor, Kenna, Clipse and Teriyaki Boyz. In 2013, the label saw success once again with the chart-topping single "Blurred Lines", performed by Robin Thicke featuring Pharrell and T.I.

In June 2025, Rob Walker relaunched Star Trak at the suggestion of Pharrell.

== Artists ==
- Chester French
- Clipse
- Fam-Lay
- Rosco P. Coldchain
- The High Speed Scene
- Kelis
- Kenna
- N.E.R.D
- The Neptunes
- Super Cat
- Slim Thug
- Snoop Dogg
- Spymob
- Suga Suga
- Robin Thicke
- Teriyaki Boyz
- Teyana Taylor
- Pharrell Williams

== Discography ==
Artist	Album	Details
N.E.R.D	In Search of...	Released: September 28, 2001; Chart position: 56 U.S.; RIAA certification: Gold
Clipse	Lord Willin'	Released: August 20, 2002; Chart position: 4 U.S.; RIAA certification: Gold
The Neptunes	Clones	Released: August 19, 2003; Chart position: 1 U.S.; RIAA certification: Gold
Kelis	Tasty	Released: December 9, 2003; Chart position: 27 U.S.; RIAA certification: Gold
N.E.R.D	Fly or Die	Released: March 23, 2004; Chart position: 6 U.S.; RIAA certification: Gold
Snoop Dogg	R&G: The Masterpiece	Released: November 16, 2004; Chart position: 6 U.S.; RIAA certification: Platinum
The High Speed Scene	The High Speed Scene	Released: March 22, 2005; Chart position: –
Slim Thug	Already Platinum	Released: July 12, 2005; Chart position: 2 U.S.; RIAA certification: Gold
Pharrell	In My Mind	Released: July 25, 2006; Chart position: 3 U.S.; RIAA certification:
Robin Thicke	The Evolution of Robin Thicke	Released: October 3, 2006; Chart position: 5 U.S.; RIAA certification: Platinum
Clipse	Hell Hath No Fury	Released: November 28, 2006; Chart position: 14 U.S.; RIAA certification: –
Kenna	Make Sure They See My Face	Released: October 16, 2007; Chart position: 124 U.S.; RIAA certification: –
N.E.R.D	Seeing Sounds	Released: June 10, 2008; Chart position: 7 U.S.; RIAA certification: –
Robin Thicke	Something Else	Released: September, 2008; Chart position: 3 U.S.; RIAA certification: –
Teriyaki Boyz	Serious Japanese	Released: February 3, 2009; Chart position: 3 JAP; RIAA certification: –
Various Artists	Fast & Furious	Released: March 31, 2009; Chart position: 116 U.S.; RIAA certification: –
Chester French	Love the Future	Released: April 21, 2009; Chart position: 77 U.S.; RIAA certification: –
Clipse	Til the Casket Drops	Released: December 8, 2009; Chart position: 41 U.S.; RIAA certification: –
Robin Thicke	Sex Therapy: The Session	Released: December 15, 2009; Chart position: 9 U.S.; RIAA certification: –
Various Artists	Despicable Me	Released: July 6, 2010; Chart position: –
N.E.R.D	Nothing	Released: November 2, 2010; Chart position: 20 U.S.; RIAA certification: –
Robin Thicke	Love After War	Released: December 6, 2011; Chart position: 22 U.S.; RIAA certification: –
Robin Thicke	Blurred Lines	Released: July 12, 2013; Chart position: 1 U.S.; RIAA certification: Gold
Robin Thicke	Paula	Released: July 1, 2014; Chart position: 9 U.S.; RIAA certification: –
