= Chad Hugo =

American musician (born 1974)

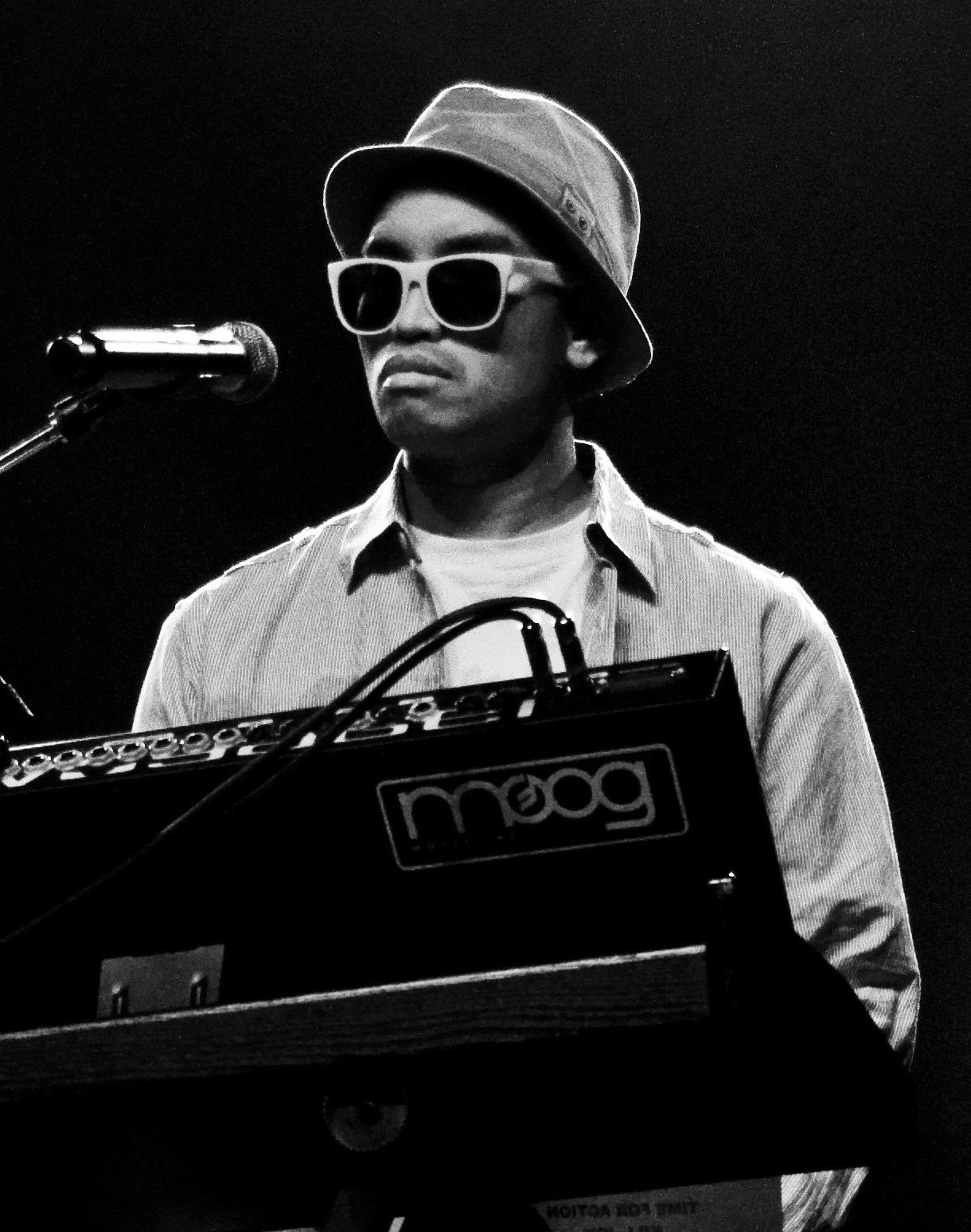
- Hugo performing with N.E.R.D. in 2009

Background information
- Also known as: Chase Chad; Neo-Thrift-Musica; Shimmy Hoffa; Yardnoise; Chad the Creator; St. Charles
- Born: Charles Edward Hugo; February 24, 1974 (age 52); Portsmouth, Virginia, U.S.
- Genres: Hip-hop; R&B; Pop; Rock
- Occupations: Musician; Record producer; songwriter
- Instruments: Piano; keyboards; guitar; saxophone; bass guitar
- Works: Solo production; co-production
- Years active: 1992–present
- Labels: I Am Other; Star Trak; Interscope; Fool's Gold; Columbia
- Formerly of: The Neptunes; N.E.R.D.
- Spouses: Rachel Hugo (m. 1998; div. 2010) Priscilla Lynch Hugo (m. 2014)
- Children: 3

Charles Edward Hugo (born February 24, 1974) is an American record producer. He was one half of the production duo the Neptunes, which he formed alongside Pharrell Williams in 1992. His production work with the duo has been credited on three decades of pop, contemporary R&B, and hip-hop releases. He was also a member of the band N.E.R.D., alongside Williams and Shay Haley, and co-founded the record label Star Trak Entertainment with Williams in 2001. In contrast to Williams, Hugo does not perform vocals on records.

== Early life ==
Hugo was born in Portsmouth, Virginia, to a Filipino-American family. His mother was a lab technician and his father served in the United States Navy. His exploration of music included recording mixtapes in his home using a boombox, and writing a paper about Robert Moog after learning about synthesizers from the news, which sparked an interest in electronic musical equipment. He later joined his school band, playing the saxophone, through which he met Pharrell Williams, with whom he began producing music. They formed the Neptunes, and in 1992, upon entering a local talent contest, they were discovered by Teddy Riley, whose studio was close to their school. Williams introduced Hugo to Shay Haley, with whom they formed the group N.E.R.D. in 1999. During high school Hugo worked as a professional DJ, performing at local church events, and he and Williams also met and begin collaborating with brothers Pusha T and Malice of Clipse, recording in Hugo's bedroom in his parents' attic.

== Career ==
Through working with Riley, the Neptunes wrote Wreckx-n-Effect's 1992 song "Rump Shaker" while still in school. They also worked with Riley's group Blackstreet, co-writing the single "Tonight's the Night" from their self-titled debut album.

The Neptunes continued their production work, contributing to projects by New York City-based rapper Noreaga, Ol' Dirty Bastard, and Kelis for whom they would entirely produce her debut studio album, Kaleidoscope in 1999, and her album Wanderland two years later. Hugo met Jay-Z during a studio session for his second studio album, In My Lifetime, Vol. 1 (1997), performing saxophone on the album's second single "The City Is Mine", with the Neptunes going on to produce a number of tracks for Jay-Z. The Neptunes also produced hip-hop duo Clipse's album, Exclusive Audio Footage in 1999, which went unreleased until 2022.

In 2001, the Neptunes founded the label Star Trak Entertainment, on which both the Neptunes and N.E.R.D. would release the entirety of their projects until the label's dissolution in 2014. The same year, N.E.R.D. released their debut studio album, In Search of..., experimenting with more live instrumentation in comparison to the Neptunes' previous output. Soon after, the Neptunes gained their first worldwide hit, producing Britney Spears' single, "I'm a Slave 4 U", and wrote and produced NSYNC's final single, "Girlfriend". After the breakup of NSYNC, they continued to work with group member Justin Timberlake, writing and producing most of his debut solo album, Justified.

In 2003, Hugo co-wrote and co-produced all songs on Kenna's debut album New Sacred Cow, and the Neptunes released a compilation album, Clones, featuring songs and remixes from various Star Trak artists. At the 2004 Grammy Awards, they won awards for "Best Pop Vocal Album" for their work on Justified, and "Producer of the Year". Continuing his work with Kenna, Hugo co-produced all tracks on his next three projects: The Black Goodbye EP (2007), Make Sure They See My Face (2007), and Land 2 Air Chronicles II: Imitation Is Suicide Chapter 1 (2013). Hugo's notable solo production work includes collaborations with Ashlee Simpson, JoJo, E-40, the Internet, and Brockhampton. He has also done remixes for Jesse McCartney, Kings of Leon, and St. Vincent. Hugo also notably co-wrote "I Care" from Beyoncé's studio album 4.

Hugo worked with Baltimore producer and DJ Daniel Biltmore under the name "MSSL CMMND", releasing mixtapes, original productions, and remixes of artists including Rhye, Iamsu!. Under the moniker Yardnoise, he produced six tracks on the companion album to the film Manny (2014), by directors Ryan Moore and Leon Gast, which chronicled the early life and career of Filipino boxer Manny Pacquiao.

Hugo and Pharrell Williams were inducted into the Songwriters Hall of Fame as a part of the 2020 class.

In 2023, Chad reunited with his MSSLCMMND partner, DJ Dan Biltmore, in Biltmore's new group, Visors. Collaborating under the alias St. Charles, Visors released their debut single "Turning" through Arbutus Records in February 2023.

In 2024, Hugo filed a legal action against Williams over the trademarks for the production duo's name. Williams subsequently confirmed the duo were no longer on speaking terms.

Hugo released his debut solo single, "JumpUpW!Nya" featuring Tierra Whack & Leikeli47, in July 2026.

== Discography ==
With N.E.R.D.

- In Search of... (2002)
- Fly or Die (2004)
- Seeing Sounds (2008)
- Nothing (2010)
- No One Ever Really Dies (2017)

With the Neptunes

- Clones (2003)

== Personal life ==
From 1998 to 2010, Hugo was married to Rachel Hugo with whom he had two children. In 2014, he married Priscilla Lynch, and they have had a child together.

== See also ==
- The Neptunes production discography
