= The Neptunes =

1992–2024 American record production duo

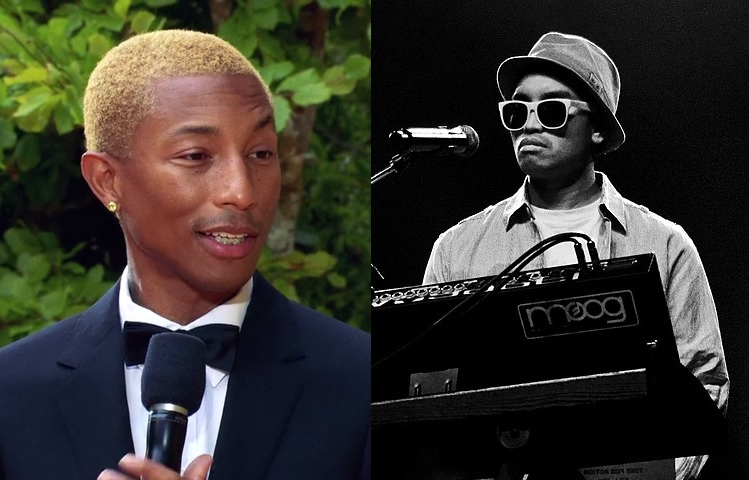
- The Neptunes (Pharrell Williams and Chad Hugo)

Background information
- Origin: Virginia Beach, Virginia, U.S.
- Genres: Hip-hop; R&B; pop
- Years active: 1992–2024
- Labels: Interscope; Star Trak; Columbia; I Am Other
- Spinoffs: N.E.R.D.
- Past members: Pharrell Williams; Chad Hugo

The Neptunes was an American record production duo composed of Pharrell Williams and Chad Hugo, formed in Virginia Beach, Virginia, in 1992. Williams often provided backing vocals and music video appearances on the duo's productions, while Hugo remained behind the scenes.

Since their inception, the Neptunes have produced songs for several music industry artists, including Clipse, Jay-Z, Kelis, N.O.R.E., Britney Spears, Justin Timberlake, Nelly, Ludacris, T.I., Robin Thicke, Usher, Gwen Stefani, and Snoop Dogg, among others. In 2009, Billboard ranked the Neptunes number one on their list of the top 10 producers of the decade. In January 2020, the Neptunes were announced to be inducted into the Songwriters Hall of Fame as a part of the 2020 class, and in May 2021, Hugo and Williams received Honorary Doctorates from Berklee College of Music and Boston Conservatory at Berklee.

== History ==
Williams and Hugo met at a summer camp for the school of the Gifted and Talented in Virginia Beach, Virginia, where Williams played drums and Hugo played tenor saxophone. Upon entering a local talent contest in 1991, the Neptunes were competing with childhood friends Missy Elliott, Timbaland & Magoo, which led the duo to be discovered by record producer Teddy Riley, whose studio was close to Williams' school. Through working with Riley, Williams wrote Wreckx-n-Effect's 1992 song "Rump Shaker" while still in school. They also worked with Riley's group Blackstreet, co-writing the single "Tonight's the Night" from their self-titled debut album.

In 1998, the Neptunes produced New York City-based rapper Noreaga's single "Superthug". They also produced Ol' Dirty Bastard's 1999 single "Got Your Money" featuring singer Kelis, for whom they would entirely produce her debut studio album, Kaleidoscope (1999), and her 2001 album Wanderland. The Neptunes produced hip-hop duo Clipse's album, Exclusive Audio Footage (1999), which was intended to be Clipse's debut album before eventually being shelved. In 2000, the Neptunes produced Jay-Z's single "I Just Wanna Love U (Give It 2 Me)" from his fifth studio album, The Dynasty: Roc La Familia, and Mystikal's "Shake Ya Ass", from his fourth studio album, Let's Get Ready. In addition, The Neptunes produced Cuban Link's single "Still Telling Lies" from Cuban's 24K album. They also co-wrote the hook to "Play How You Want" featuring P!nk.

In 2001, N.E.R.D. released their debut studio album, In Search of..., featuring production from the Neptunes. In the same year, the Neptunes gained their first worldwide hit with Britney Spears' single, "I'm a Slave 4 U", for her eponymous third studio album, Britney.

The Neptunes wrote and produced NSYNC's final single, "Girlfriend", then wrote and produced most of co-lead singer Justin Timberlake's debut solo album, Justified (2002), including lead singles "Like I Love You", "Rock Your Body", and "Señorita".

In 2003, the Neptunes released a compilation album, Clones, featuring songs and remixes from various Star Trak artists. The Neptunes won "Producer of the Year" at the 2004 Grammy Awards.

In 2024, Hugo filed a legal action against Williams over the trademarks for the production duo's name. Williams subsequently confirmed the duo were no longer on speaking terms.

== Discography ==
=== Compilation albums ===
List of albums, with selected chart positions
Title	Album details	Peak chart positions			Certifications
Title	Album details	US	US R&B /HH	CAN	Certifications
Clones	Released: August 19, 2003; Label: Star Trak, RCA	1	1	7	RIAA: Gold

=== Singles ===
List of singles, with selected chart positions
Title	Year	Peak chart positions			Album
Title	Year	US	US R&B /HH	US Rap	Album
"Frontin'" (featuring Jay-Z)	2003	5	1	—	Clones
"Light Your Ass on Fire" (featuring Busta Rhymes)	2003	69	23	12	Clones
"It Blows My Mind" (featuring Snoop Dogg)	2003	—	68	—	Clones
"Hot Damn" (featuring Clipse)	2003	—	58	—	Clones
"Pomegranate" (with Deadmau5)	2020	—	—	—	Non-album single
"—" denotes a recording that did not chart or was not released in that territory.

== Awards and nominations ==
The Neptunes awards and nominations
Awards and nominations
Award	Wins	Nominations
Grammy	4	12
Billboard R&B/Hip-Hop Awards	2	6

Totals (Note: Certain award groups do not simply award one winner. They acknowledge several different recipients, have runners-up, and have third place. Since this is a specific recognition and is different from losing an award, runner-up mentions are considered wins in this award tally. For simplification and to avoid errors, each award in this list has been presumed to have had a prior nomination.)
- Wins: 6
- Nominations: 18

The duo has received numerous awards, such as from the Grammy Awards, where they were nominated every year from 2004 to 2007. The Neptunes have received three Grammy Awards: Producer of the Year, Non-Classical, Best Pop Vocal Album for Justified and Best Rap Song for "Money Maker".

=== Billboard R&B/Hip-Hop Awards ===
The Billboard R&B/Hip-Hop Awards are sponsored by Billboard magazine and held annually in December.

Year	Nominee / work	Award	Result
2002	The Neptunes	Songwriter of the Year	Nominated
2002	The Neptunes	Producer of the Year	Nominated
2003	The Neptunes	Songwriter of the Year	Nominated
2003	The Neptunes	Producer of the Year	Won
2004	The Neptunes	Producer of the Year	Nominated
2009	The Neptunes	Producer of the Decade	Won

=== Grammy Awards ===
The Grammy Awards are awarded annually by the National Academy of Recording Arts and Sciences of the United States.

Year	Nominee / work	Award	Result
2004	The Neptunes	Producer of the Year, Non-Classical	Won
2004	Justified	Best Pop Vocal Album	Won
2004	"Frontin'"	Best Rap/Sung Collaboration	Nominated
2004	"Beautiful"	Best Rap/Sung Collaboration	Nominated
2004	"Beautiful"	Best Rap Song	Nominated
2004	"Excuse Me Miss"	Best Rap Song	Nominated
2005	"Drop It Like It's Hot"	Best Rap Performance by a Duo or Group	Nominated
2005	"Drop It Like It's Hot"	Best Rap Song	Nominated
2006	The Neptunes	Producer of the Year, Non-Classical	Nominated
2006	The Emancipation of Mimi	Best Contemporary R&B Album	Won
2007	"Money Maker"	Best Rap Song	Won

== See also ==
- The Neptunes production discography
