= No One Ever Really Dies =

2017 studio album by N.E.R.D.

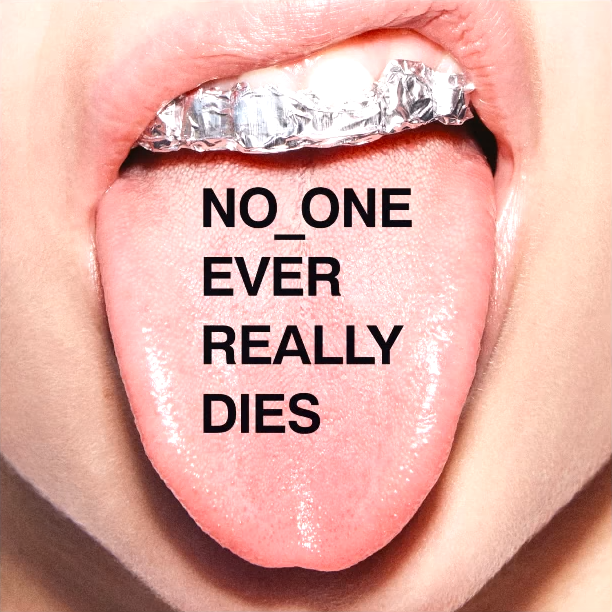

Studio album by N.E.R.D.
- Released: December 15, 2017
- Studios: Glenwood Place (Burbank); Chalice, Conway and Henson (Hollywood); The Lunchtable (Los Angeles); The Why (Malibu); South Beach (Miami Beach); Makoché (Bismarck, North Dakota); Flux and Jungle City (New York City); Sony (Tokyo); Metropolis (London)
- Genres: Hip hop; experimental hip hop; new wave; post-punk; punk
- Length: 51:09
- Labels: I Am Other; Columbia
- Producers: Pharrell Williams; Rhea Dummett; Kuk Harrell; Chad Hugo; Mike Larson; Thundercat

N.E.R.D. chronology
Nothing (2010)	No One Ever Really Dies (2017)

Singles from No One Ever Really Dies
- 1. "Lemon" Released: November 1, 2017; 2. "1000" Released: November 29, 2017; 3. "Don't Don't Do It!" Released: January 12, 2018

No One Ever Really Dies (stylized as NO_ONE EVER REALLY DIES) is the fifth and final studio album by American hip hop and rock band N.E.R.D.. It was released on December 15, 2017, by I Am Other and Columbia Records. It is the group's first full-length album in 7 years, following 2010's Nothing, and features guest appearances from Rihanna, André 3000, Kendrick Lamar, M.I.A., Gucci Mane, Wale, Future and Ed Sheeran among others, and was preceded by three singles; "Lemon" with Rihanna, "1000" with Future, and "Don't Don't Do It!" with Kendrick Lamar.

== Background ==
On February 6, 2017, during an interview with BBC Radio 1, Pharrell stated that "it's feeling really good, really special" about the group's return.

In October 2017, the album was teased after posters were popping up on the side of streets, and by concertgoers at the 2017 Camp Flog Gnaw Carnival.

The album was debuted with a live listening party during the first day at ComplexCon, thus revealing the tracklist. Pharrell revealed the album's cover art and release date via Instagram and Twitter on November 22, 2017.

== Artwork ==
The album's artwork depicts a tongue with the album's title placed on top and aluminum foil on the teeth to substitute grills.

== Critical reception ==
Professional ratings
Aggregate scores
Source	Rating
Metacritic	74/100
Review scores
Source	Rating
AllMusic	4/5 stars
Consequence of Sound	B
Exclaim!	8/10
The Guardian	4/5 stars
HipHopDX	4.1/5
Pitchfork	6.2/10
Rolling Stone	3.5/5 stars
Tom Hull – on the Web	B+
Chicago Tribune	3.5/4 stars
The Observer	4/5 stars

No One Ever Really Dies received positive reviews from music critics. At Metacritic, which assigns a normalised rating out of 100 to reviews from mainstream critics, the album has an average score of 74, based on 17 reviews, indicating "generally favorable reviews".

Greg Kot of the Chicago Tribune, in a 3.5 out of 4 star review, praised the album saying "No One Ever Really Dies” (Columbia), the band's first album in seven years, is a typically diverse, trippy ride from the group." In a four out of five star review for AllMusic, critic Andy Kellman claimed that "Tied together with recurring declarations of "mad ethnic right now," sampled from Retch's 2016 viral clip, the album is all raucous resistance to issues ranging from anti-immigration to police brutality to transgender rights. When Williams barks "You fuckin' with survivors!" like an activist Rockwell, he perfectly summarizes the indignant optimism that dominates the best N.E.R.D album since the original version of In Search of....." With an 8/10 rating, A Harmony of Exclaim! declared "We're approaching 2018, but N.E.R.D. are centuries ahead of the rest of us. No_One Ever Really Dies is the group's most futuristic and experimental effort to date; it's gutsy and more than a little weird, but there's a slick tidiness underpinning the chaos from start to finish."

Giving a 4.1 out of 5 grade, Kyle Eustice of HipHopDX opined "True to form, the 11-track effort is more like a collection of fiery mini-symphonies that effortlessly swing from genre to genre. Every track has multiple intricate parts that make each one feel like its own wild musical journey. Much like the trio’s 2002 debut In Search Of…, it’s impossible to classify the record as merely “Hip Hop” when it's a cornucopia of layered, eclectic sounds, including pop, R&B, trap, rock, fast-paced electronica, reggae and calypso." Consequence of Sound's Dan Weiss gave a B saying "With NO_ONE EVER REALLY DIES, the trio have delivered the party-at-the-end-of-the-world record that only their Rolodex could truly dream to life." Kitty Empire of The Observer, in a 4 out of 5 star review, found "This is a brash, busy party record with its eyes wide open, in which the NERD brand is thoroughly refreshed."

== Track listing ==
Credits adapted from Tidal. All tracks are produced by Pharrell Williams, except where noted.

No.	Title	Writer(s)	Producer(s)	Length
1.	"Lemon" (with Rihanna)	Pharrell Williams	Williams; Kuk Harrell^{[b]}	3:39
2.	"Deep Down Body Thurst"	Williams	Williams; Thundercat^{[a]}	4:11
3.	"Voilà" (with Gucci Mane and Wale)	Williams; Radric Davis; Olubowale Akintimehin	Williams; Thundercat^{[a]}	4:20
4.	"1000" (with Future)	Williams; Nayvadius Wilburn		4:03
5.	"Don't Don't Do It!" (with Kendrick Lamar)	Williams; Frank Ocean; Kendrick Duckworth		4:17
6.	"ESP"	Williams	Williams; Chad Hugo^{[a]}	5:29
7.	"Lightning Fire Magic Prayer"	Williams		7:44
8.	"Rollinem 7's" (with André 3000)	Williams; André Benjamin		5:09
9.	"Kites" (with Kendrick Lamar and M.I.A.)	Williams; Duckworth; Mathangi Arulpragasam	Williams; Rhea Dummett^{[b]}; Mike Larson^{[b]}	4:50
10.	"Secret Life of Tigers"	Williams		3:45
11.	"Lifting You" (with Ed Sheeran)	Williams		3:42
Total length:				51:09

Notes

- ^{^[a]} signifies an additional producer.
- ^{^[b]} signifies an additional vocal producer.
- "Don’t Don’t Do It!" originally featured credited vocals by Frank Ocean.
- "Deep Down Body Thurst" features additional vocals by Mike Larson and additional bass by Thundercat.
- "Voilà" features additional bass by Thundercat.
- "1000" features additional vocals by Alex DePersia, Mette Towley, Rhea Dummett and Phi Hollinger.
- "ESP" features additional vocals by Alex DePersia and Mette Towley.
- "Lightning Fire Magic Prayer" features additional vocals by Rocket Williams, Helen Williams, Rhea Dummett and Mike Larson.
- "Kites" features additional vocals by ASAP Rocky, Mary J. Blige, Rhea Dummett, Hana Hollinger, Phi Hollinger and Helen Williams.
- "Secret Life of Tigers" features additional vocals by First Summer Uika and Momose Momo of Billie Idle, and Cara Delevingne.

== Personnel ==
N.E.R.D

- Pharrell Williams – production (all tracks), executive production
- Chad Hugo – additional production (track 6), synthesizers (tracks 2, 5), doorslam (track 2), synth FX (track 3), programming (track 3)
- Shay Haley

Additional musicians

- Kendrick Lamar – performance (tracks 5, 9)
- Rihanna – performance (track 1)
- Gucci Mane – performance (track 3)
- Wale – performance (track 3)
- Future – performance (track 4)
- André 3000 – performance (track 8)
- M.I.A. – performance (track 9)
- Ed Sheeran – performance (track 11)
- Thundercat – bass (tracks 2, 3)
- Brent Paschke – electric guitar (tracks 2, 3, 5, 7, 10)
- Rhea Dummett – additional vocals (tracks 4, 7, 9)
- Mike "Miguel Milliones" Larson – additional vocals (tracks 2, 7), programming (tracks 2–11)
- Alex DePersia – additional vocals (tracks 4, 6)
- Mette Towley – additional vocals (tracks 4, 6)
- Phi Hollinger – additional vocals (tracks 4, 9)
- Helen Williams – additional vocals (tracks 7, 9)
- Rocket Williams – additional vocals (track 7)
- ASAP Rocky – additional vocals (track 9)
- Mary J. Blige – additional vocals (track 9)
- Hana Hollinger – additional vocals (track 9)
- First Summer Uika – additional vocals (track 10)
- Momose Momo – additional vocals (track 10)
- Cara Delevingne – additional vocals (track 10)
- Tenley Sage – native youth (track 9)
- Red Eagle Perkins – native youth (track 9)
- Amiah Fimbres – native youth (track 9)
- Precious Bernie – native youth (track 9)
- Wacantkiya Eagle – native youth (track 9)
- Mahpiya Eagle – native youth (track 9)
- Jayde Kelly – native youth (track 9)
- Chayla Warren – native youth (track 9)
- Winona Gayto – native youth (track 9)
- Ku-uipo Mauai – native youth (track 9)

Technical

- Mike Larson – recording engineer (all tracks), native youth vocal production (track 9), mixing
- Andrew Coleman – recording engineer (all tracks)
- James Hunt – recording engineer (tracks 5, 9)
- Matt Schaeffer – recording engineer (tracks 5, 9)
- Marcos Tovar – recording engineer (track 1)
- Kori Anders – recording engineer (track 3)
- Ken Oriole – recording engineer (track 9)
- Kuk Harrell – Rihanna vocal production (track 1)
- Rhea Dummett – native youth vocal production (track 9)
- Ben "Bengineer" Sedano – 2nd engineer (all tracks), assistant mix engineer
- Thomas Cullison – 2nd engineer (tracks 1–6, 8–11), assistant mix engineer
- Jacob Dennis – 2nd engineer (tracks 2–5 7–10)
- Jordon Silva – 2nd engineer (tracks 2, 7, 8–10)
- Masayuki Hara – 2nd engineer (tracks 2, 3, 9, 10)
- Madoka Kambe – 2nd engineer (tracks 2, 3, 9, 10)
- Hart Gunther – 2nd engineer (tracks 1, 5, 11)
- Daryl Johnson – 2nd engineer (tracks 2, 6, 7)
- Miguel DaCruz – 2nd engineer (tracks 1, 11)
- Eric Eylands – 2nd engineer (tracks 3, 10)
- Brendan Morawski – 2nd engineer (track 1)
- David Kim – 2nd engineer (track 2)
- Todd Hurtt – 2nd engineer (track 4)
- David Kim – 2nd engineer (track 4)
- Ramon Rivas – 2nd engineer (track 5)
- Matt Tuggle – 2nd engineer (track 6)
- Iain Findlay – 2nd engineer (track 7)
- Josh Seflers – 2nd engineer (track 8)
- John Muller – 2nd engineer (track 8)
- Sean Klein – 2nd engineer (track 8)
- David Swenson – 2nd engineer (track 9)
- Graham Thomas – 2nd engineer (track 9)
- Leslie Brathwaite – mixing
- Jon Sher – assistant mix engineer
- Tony Flores – assistant mix engineer
- Chris Athens – mastering

Release

- Caron Veazey – Pharrell Williams management
- Ron Laffitte – Pharrell Williams management
- Alex DePersia – Pharrell Williams project management
- Todd Tourso – Pharrell Williams creative direction, art direction
- Phi Hollinger – Pharrell Williams creative direction, art direction
- Pres Rodriguez – art direction
- Mike Larson – album A&R and coordination
- Jerry Edouard – album A&R and coordination
- Michelle Dupont – Chad Hugo management
- Jan Fairchild – Chad Hugo engineering
- Erik Ian – photography

== Charts ==
Chart (2017)	Peak position
Australian Albums (ARIA)	58
Belgian Albums (Ultratop Flanders)	92
Belgian Albums (Ultratop Wallonia)	138
Canadian Albums (Billboard)	57
Dutch Albums (Album Top 100)	32
Latvian Albums (LaIPA)	35
New Zealand Heatseeker Albums (RMNZ)	2
Swiss Albums (Schweizer Hitparade)	65
UK Albums (Official Charts)	80
US Billboard 200	31
US Top R&B/Hip-Hop Albums (Billboard)	13
