= Maybe (N.E.R.D. song) =

2004 single by N.E.R.D.

Single by N.E.R.D.

from the album Fly or Die
- B-side: "She Wants to Move" (remix)
- Released: June 14, 2004
- Length: 4:22
- Label: Virgin
- Songwriters: Pharrell Williams; Chad Hugo
- Producer: The Neptunes

N.E.R.D. singles chronology
"She Wants to Move" (2004)	"Maybe" (2004)	"Everyone Nose (All the Girls Standing in the Line for the Bathroom)" (2008)

Music video
- "Maybe" on YouTube

"Maybe" is a single from American band N.E.R.D.'s second studio album, Fly or Die (2004). The song features Lenny Kravitz on guitar and Questlove on drums. It peaked at number 25 in the United Kingdom, number 31 in Ireland, and number 34 in the Netherlands. The song was featured in an iPod commercial that also promoted the song.

A "Maybe" remix was released a year later in 2005 on rap duo Clipse's "We Got It 4 Cheap, Volume 2" mixtape. The song is a stylistic departure from the original song. The remix features Pharrell rapping over Outkast's "Elevators (Me & You)" instrumental.

== Track listings ==
UK CD1 and European CD single

1. "Maybe" (radio edit) – 3:30
2. "She Wants to Move" (Native Tongue remix) – 4:44

UK CD2

1. "Maybe" (radio edit) – 3:30
2. "She Wants to Move" (Native Tongue remix) – 4:44
3. "She Wants to Move" (Basement Jaxx remix) – 5:12
4. "Maybe" (live) – 4:24
5. "Maybe" (video) – 3:30

UK 12-inch single

1. "Maybe" (radio edit) – 3:30
2. "Maybe" (SA-RA remix) – 3:31
3. "She Wants to Move" (Basement Jaxx remix) – 5:12
4. "She Wants to Move" (Native Tongue remix) – 4:44

Australian CD single

1. "Maybe" (radio edit) – 3:30
2. "She Wants to Move" (Native Tongue remix) – 4:44
3. "Maybe" (live) – 3:30

Japanese EP

1. "Maybe" (album version)
2. "Maybe" (Sander Kleinenberg remix)
3. "Rock Star" (Jason Nevins remix edit)
4. "She Wants to Move" (Basement Jaxx mix)
5. "She Wants to Move" (Native Tongue remix)
6. "Lapdance" (Freedom 5 remix)

== Personnel ==
- Pharrell Williams – lead vocals, production
- Chad Hugo – keyboards, production
- Shay Haley – bass, backing vocals, keyboards, production
- Lenny Kravitz, Michael Landau – guitars
- Questlove (The Roots) – drums

== Charts ==
Chart (2004)	Peak position
Australia (ARIA)	48
Australian Urban (ARIA)	20
Belgium (Ultratip Bubbling Under Flanders)	8
Belgium (Ultratip Bubbling Under Wallonia)	10
Ireland (IRMA)	31
Italy (FIMI)	45
Netherlands (Dutch Top 40)	34
Netherlands (Single Top 100)	37
Scotland Singles (OCC)	18
UK Singles (OCC)	25
UK Hip Hop/R&B (OCC)	6
US Dance Club Play (Billboard) Sander Kleinenberg remixes	19

== Release history ==
Region	Date	Format(s)	Label(s)	Ref.
United Kingdom	June 14, 2004	12-inch vinyl; CD	Virgin	
Australia	June 28, 2004	CD	Virgin	
Japan	July 28, 2004	CD	Virgin	
