= Bush (album) =

Studio album by Snoop Dogg
- Released: May 12, 2015
- Recorded: 2014–2015
- Studios: Circle House; Crescent Moon; Hit Factory Criteria; Studio 26 (Miami); Conway; Record Plant (Hollywood); Estudio Santito (Buenos Aires); Glenwood Place (Burbank); No Excuses (Santa Monica); South Beach; Studios at the Setai (Miami Beach); The Studios at the Palms (Las Vegas); Thomas Crown (Virginia Beach)
- Genres: West Coast hip-hop; funk; disco
- Length: 41:13
- Labels: Doggy Style; I Am Other; Columbia
- Producers: Pharrell Williams; Chad Hugo

Snoop Dogg chronology
That's My Work 5 (2014)	Bush (2015)	LBC Movement presents Beach City (2015)

Singles from Bush
- 1. "Peaches N Cream" Released: March 10, 2015; 2. "So Many Pros" Released: April 14, 2015; 3. "California Roll" Released: May 5, 2015

Bush (stylized in all caps) is the thirteenth studio album by American rapper Snoop Dogg. It was released on May 12, 2015, through Doggy Style Records and I Am Other, and distributed by Columbia Records. The album was produced by Pharrell Williams and Chad Hugo. It features guest appearances from Kendrick Lamar, Stevie Wonder, Charlie Wilson, Gwen Stefani, T.I. and Rick Ross. Bush was the first album by the rapper after his return to the hip-hop moniker Snoop Dogg.

Bush was supported by three singles; "Peaches N Cream", "So Many Pros" and "California Roll". The album received generally positive reviews from critics, debuting at number 14 on the US Billboard 200, and number one on the US Top R&B/Hip-Hop Albums. It serves as the follow-up to Snoop's twelfth studio album Reincarnated (2013).

== Background and title ==
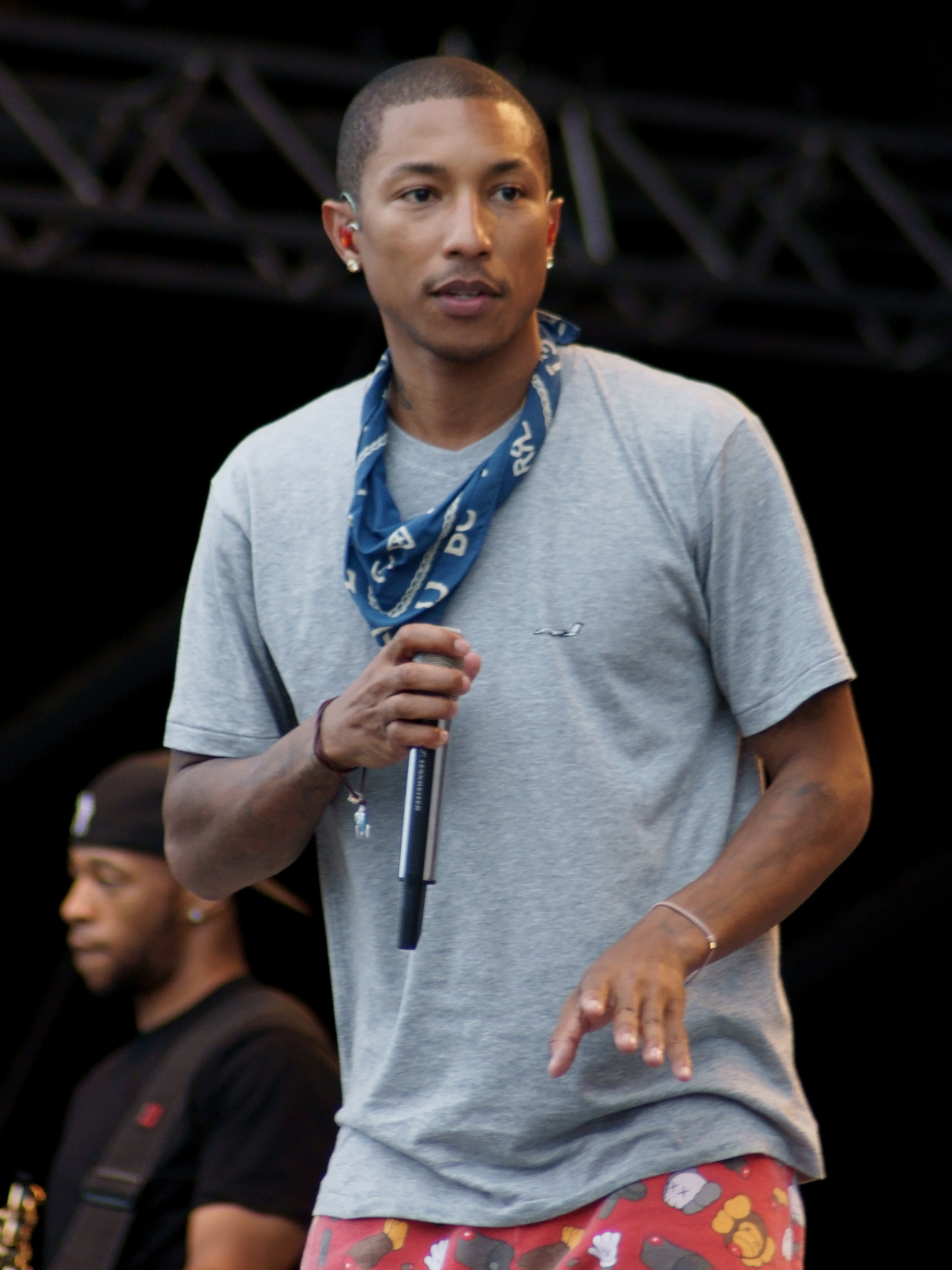
Pharrell (pictured) served as executive producer on the album.

On August 28, 2014, a video was released of what would be a preview on one of the songs working together between Snoop Dogg and Pharrell Williams. In September 2014, Snoop announced on his Instagram account, his new work together with Pharrell. The LP is the first studio album entirely of hip-hop released by Snoop since Doggumentary (2011). Since then, Snoop alongside his good friend and rapper Wiz Khalifa, released the soundtrack Mac & Devin Go to High School. This collaborative album contains the hit single "Young, Wild & Free" (top ten in the Billboard Hot 100). The song was nominated for a Grammy under the category of Best Rap Song. In 2013, Snoop then used his new moniker Snoop Lion, and released his first reggae and twelfth overall album Reincarnated. This album was nominated at the 56th Annual Grammy Awards in the category Best Reggae Album. At the end of 2013, he then used another moniker Snoopzilla, in reference to Bootzilla, and joined with music producer Dâm-Funk to launch the entirely of funk collaborative album 7 Days of Funk.

In January 2015, Snoop revealed the album's title at the Consumer Electronics Show that occurred in Las Vegas, Nevada, United States.

The track "So Many Pros" was originally a track recorded by Timbaland and featured Pharrell Williams and Justin Timberlake, called "Been It", however, due to Timbaland's album being cancelled Pharrell re-worked the final track, in which Chad Hugo, Charlie Wilson, Pharrell and Rhea Dummett featuring as backing vocals. The video was also shot for "Been It", with amateur footage showing Timberlake recording his portion of the music video whilst on The 20/20 Experience World Tour and Timbaland recording his portion on a beach with skantly clad models. The lyrics to the song seem to have remained unchanged, however the lyric "...so many hoes" has been changed to "...so many pros" which is the title of the track itself.

== Production ==
The album was produced by Pharrell Williams and his Neptunes partner Chad Hugo. The duo had worked in partnership with Snoop Dogg on Paid tha Cost to Be da Boss (2002), R&G (Rhythm & Gangsta): The Masterpiece (2004) and Tha Blue Carpet Treatment (2006). The partnership between these artists has earned them several successful singles, including "From tha Chuuuch to da Palace", "Beautiful" and "Drop It Like It's Hot", among others.

== Promotion ==
"Peaches N Cream" was released on March 10, 2015, as the first single from the album. The song features guest vocals from Snoop's longtime collaborator Charlie Wilson. The lyric video was released on the same day. The song peaked at number 16 on the US Bubbling Under Hot 100 Singles.

The album's second single, "So Many Pros", was released on April 14, 2015. The music video won an MTV Video Music Award for Best Art Direction, during the ceremony on August 30, 2015.

The album's third single, "California Roll", was released on May 5, 2015. The song featuring vocals from American R&B singer Stevie Wonder. The single peaking at number 15 on the US R&B Songs.

== Critical reception ==
Professional ratings
Aggregate scores
Source	Rating
AnyDecentMusic?	6.2/10
Metacritic	69/100
Review scores
Source	Rating
AllMusic	4/5 stars
Billboard	3/5 stars
Consequence	C
The Guardian	4/5 stars
HipHopDX	3.5/5
Los Angeles Times	3/4 stars
NME	7/10
Pitchfork	6.5/10
Rolling Stone	3.5/5 stars
XXL	4/5

Bush was met with generally positive reviews. At Metacritic, which assigns a normalized rating out of 100 to reviews from professional publications, the album received an average score of 69, based on 20 reviews. Aggregator AnyDecentMusic? gave it 6.2 out of 10, based on their assessment of the critical consensus.

David Jeffries of AllMusic said, "Accept Bush is a delayed dank disco triumph, and then drop it like it's hot, one more time." Brian Josephs of Consequence said, "Although it's well-intentioned, you're very aware that the only reason you're at this party is because Snoop invited you." August Brown of the Los Angeles Times said, "There aren't many '90s rappers who could credibly settle into a sound like this, but Snoop is an excellent student of his formative musical era." Kate Hutchinson of The Guardian said, "Bush is a high five of an album, made for hydraulic cars and throbbing dancefloors, delivered, in typical Snoop style, as if from a fur-lined throne overlooking a pool party." Kellan Miller of HipHopDX said, "Snoop and Charlie Wilson play off each other's energy, and the instantly catchy nature of the track justifies the notion that the diminished returns of Bush are the result of an excellent dream deferred by poor execution."

Phil Hebblethwaite of NME said, "Snoop takes a surprising back seat, singing low in the mix and seldom rapping--an odd decision, but it works and when Bush is good, it's an absolute joy." Jonathan Frahm of PopMatters said, "All in all, Bush is another consistent release from Snoop to add to his portfolio, with enough freshness to still be spinning his name in the clubs." Roger Krastz of XXL said, "Overall, Bush is a fun and enjoyable listen from start to finish with the album's retro imagery brought to life by Snoop Dogg and his slick persona." Julian Kimble of Pitchfork said, "While Bush is strong enough musically, you can't help but wonder what would've happened if this crew had followed R&G with a full-length a decade ago, when everyone involved was still in his prime." Brittany Spanos of Rolling Stone said, "From the moment opening track "California Roll" hits its "Drop It Like It's Hot"-ish bass line, Bush is a pleasant stroll down memory lane." Kris Ex of Billboard said, "It's a quick listen, clocking in at less than 45 minutes, and the 10 tracks are laid-back--perhaps too much."

== Commercial performance ==
In the United States, Bush debuted at number 14 on the Billboard 200 with 32,000 album-equivalent units, which included 27,000 pure album sales, marking the third highest debut of the week and the eighth best-selling album of the week. The album was also streamed 2.8 million times in the first week. It serves as Snoop's sixth solo album to debut at number one on the Top R&B/Hip-Hop Albums. Bush dropped to the number 44 in its second week, earning an additional 12,000 album-equivalent units, which included 9,000 pure album sales. In the United Kingdom, the album debuted at number 25 on the UK Albums Chart. Bush was Snoop's tenth solo album to debut at top-ten on the UK R&B Chart, reached at number two. As of May 2016, the album has sold 250,000 copies worldwide.

== Track listing ==
Bush track listing
No.	Title	Writer(s)	Producer(s)	Length
1.	"California Roll" (featuring Stevie Wonder)	Calvin Broadus, Jr.; Pharrell Williams	Williams; Chad Hugo	4:12
2.	"This City"	Broadus; Kelly Sheehan; Williams	Williams; Hugo	3:33
3.	"R U A Freak"	Broadus; Williams	Williams; Hugo	3:45
4.	"Awake"	Broadus; Williams	Williams; Hugo	3:43
5.	"So Many Pros"	Broadus; Williams	Williams; Hugo	4:06
6.	"Peaches N Cream" (featuring Charlie Wilson)	Broadus; Williams; Cornell Haynes, Jr.; James Brown; Robert Ginyard, Jr.; George Clinton; Walter Morrison; Garry Shider; Mary Brockert	Williams	4:43
7.	"Edibles" (featuring T.I.)	Broadus; Clifford Harris, Jr.; Ted Chung; Williams	Williams; Hugo	3:21
8.	"I Knew That"	Broadus; Williams	Williams; Hugo	3:59
9.	"Run Away" (featuring Gwen Stefani)	Broadus; Brent Paschke; Williams; Sigidi Abdullah; Larry Mizell; Bradley Ridgell	Williams; Hugo	5:13
10.	"I'm Ya Dogg" (featuring Kendrick Lamar and Rick Ross)	Broadus; Kendrick Duckworth; William Roberts II; Williams	Williams; Hugo	4:38
Total length:				41:13

Notes

- "California Roll" contains background vocals by Pharrell Williams
- "This City" contains background vocals by Charlie Wilson and Kelly Sheehan
- "Awake" contains background vocals by Charlie Wilson and Pharrell Williams
- "So Many Pros" contains background vocals by Chad Hugo, Charlie Wilson, Pharrell Williams, and Rhea Dummett
- "Peaches N Cream" contains background vocals by Nelly, Pharrell Williams, and Rhea Dummett
- "Edibles" contains background vocals by Charlie Wilson
- "I Knew That" contains background vocals by Charlie Wilson, Pharrell Williams, and Rhea Dummett
- "Run Away" contains background vocals by Rhea Dummett
- "I'm Ya Dogg" contains background vocals by Charlie Wilson and Rhea Dummett

Sample credits

- "Peaches N Cream" contains samples of "It Takes Two", written by James Brown and Robert Ginyard Jr.; "One Nation Under a Groove", written by George Clinton, Walter Morrison, and Garry Shider; and "I Need Your Lovin'", written by Mary Brockert.

== Personnel ==
Credits for Bush adapted from AllMusic.

- Snoop Dogg – primary artist
- Pharrell Williams – executive producer, producer, vocals, vocals (background), clapping
- Chad Hugo – producer, vocals (background)
- Stevie Wonder – featured artist, harmonica
- Charlie Wilson – featured artist, vocals (background)
- Rhea Dummett – vocals (background)
- T.I. – featured artist
- Gwen Stefani – featured artist
- Kendrick Lamar – featured artist
- Rick Ross – featured artist
- Brent Paschke – guitar (acoustic), guitar (electric)
- Andrew Coleman – arranger, digital editing, engineer, guitar (electric), moog synthesizer
- Mike Larson – arranger, coordination, digital editing, engineer
- Hart Gunther – assistant engineer, engineer
- Nick Valentin – assistant engineer
- Dustin Breeden – assistant engineer
- Mick Guzauski – mixing
- Brian "Big Bass" Gardner – mastering

== Charts ==
=== Weekly charts ===
Chart performance for Bush
Chart (2015)	Peak position
Australian Albums (ARIA)	32
Australian Urban Albums (ARIA)	4
Austrian Albums (Ö3 Austria)	34
Belgian Albums (Ultratop Flanders)	45
Belgian Albums (Ultratop Wallonia)	42
Brazilian Albums (ABPD)	13
Canadian Albums (Billboard)	13
Danish Albums (Hitlisten)	35
Dutch Albums (Album Top 100)	35
French Albums (SNEP)	23
German Albums (Offizielle Top 100)	32
Italian Albums (FIMI)	31
New Zealand Albums (Recorded Music NZ)	39
Norwegian Albums (VG-lista)	32
Scottish Albums (Official Charts)	39
Spanish Albums (Promusicae)	89
Swiss Albums (Schweizer Hitparade)	15
Swedish Albums (Sverigetopplistan)	58
UK Albums (Official Charts)	25
UK R&B Albums (Official Charts)	2
US Billboard 200	14
US Top R&B/Hip-Hop Albums (Billboard)	1
US Indie Store Album Sales (Billboard)	6

=== Year-end charts ===
2015 year-end chart performance for Bush
Chart (2015)	Position
US Top R&B/Hip-Hop Albums (Billboard)	70

== Release history ==
Release formats for Bush
Region	Date	Label(s)	Format(s)	Ref.
Brazil	May 8, 2015	BMG; Sony	Digital download	
United Kingdom	May 11, 2015	Columbia	CD; digital download	
United States	May 12, 2015	Doggy Style; Columbia	CD; digital download	
United States	July 10, 2015	Doggy Style; Columbia	Vinyl	

== See also ==
- List of Billboard number-one R&B/hip-hop albums of 2015
- 2015 in hip hop music
