= Seeing Sounds =

Studio album by N.E.R.D.
- Released: June 10, 2008
- Recorded: 2007–08
- Studios: South Beach Studios (Miami, Florida); Record Plant (Los Angeles, California)
- Genres: Hip hop; alternative rock
- Length: 50:43
- Labels: Star Trak; Interscope
- Producer: The Neptunes

N.E.R.D. chronology
Fly or Die (2004)	Seeing Sounds (2008)	Nothing (2010)

Singles from Seeing Sounds
- 1. "Everyone Nose (All the Girls Standing in the Line for the Bathroom)" Released: May 13, 2008; 2. "Spaz" Released: July 2008; 3. "Sooner or Later" Released: December 16, 2008

Seeing Sounds is the third studio album by American alternative rock band N.E.R.D. released June 10, 2008 on Star Trak Entertainment and Interscope Records in the United States. After ending their contract with Virgin Records in 2005, the band felt their previous album Fly or Die (2004) was too consistent. Using their own money, the band recorded the album in Florida and California. The album was produced solely by record production duo The Neptunes, consisting of Pharrell Williams and Chad Hugo, with additional assistance by rock band Spymob and was mainly written by Williams. The album's title, as well as its content, revolves around the neurological phenomenon of synesthesia, the mixing of sensory modalities.

The album debuted at number seven on the U.S. Billboard 200 chart, selling 80,000 in its first week. It peaked in the top 20 in Australia, Canada, the Netherlands, Switzerland and the United Kingdom, while also charting in the several other countries. Upon its release, Seeing Sounds received generally mixed to positive reviews from most music critics. Some writers called the record N.E.R.D's best album thus far and praised its production, while others negatively criticized Williams' singing and the album's lyrical content.

In 2024, the song "Sooner or Later" appeared on Williams' soundtrack album Piece by Piece (Original Motion Picture Soundtrack).

== Concept ==
While touring in promotion of their previous album, Fly or Die, N.E.R.D ended their contract with Virgin Records in 2005. After touring, Pharrell Williams felt that the album was too consistent; he felt the band abandoned a sense of unpredictability. The band became "hooked" on the energy from their fans and began recording their third album. Williams and fellow band member Chad Hugo later established Star Trak Entertainment, a subsidiary of Interscope Records.

For the album, the band wanted to create the atmosphere of hyperactivity they knew their fans wanted. They wrote a few songs, but felt the songs "weren't strong enough" and sent them to other musicians. Member Shay Haley explained that in their new work, the band wanted to add energy to the emotional appeal of their past albums, though the band did not conceive a clear plan for the direction of the new album. N.E.R.D described the desired outcomes of the album as "a pre-cognitive effort to make music that would make sense for us on while we're on a stage and to recapture that feeling we love so much" and additionally, "to make something that was thought provoking and for people to listen to it and enjoy it on their own time".

Originally titled N.3.R.D, the title was changed to Seeing Sounds. Williams explained that the title was based on synesthesia, a neurological phenomenon the band learned of while watching the Discovery Channel. They were inspired to create music that could be conceived as a live show. He was surprised to learn not everyone experienced while listening to music. He described synesthesia as the outcome when "one sense gets more information than what's intended", stimulated by sensory deprivation. Haley further elaborated, saying that it is a mixture of senses that causes a person to experience colorful hearing and auditory smell. When the band created the album, it was the music they envisioned and decided the appropriate title for the album, Seeing Sounds. Williams pointed out that the lyrics were also inspired by synesthesia. He said that his fans want to "rock out" and be taken on an "emotional roller coaster", and the only way to do that is to give the fans some records they could blast out on their speakers. The European-influenced music is layered and textured with many music modalities, differing from their past club-oriented albums. Hugo called the album a "big album of LSD, sonic drug". The band described the album of being an exercise in creative cohesion, band unity and a renewed purpose for themselves.

Williams went on to add:

If you really analyze that, the most inspiration is probably deep inside a synesthesiac. So for us, 'seeing sounds' is what we relate to the most. We figured we'd make an album out of it. Energy and emotion was the criteria [while recording], but we made the music anticipating the [live] show. That was the most important thing…[The song] 'Spaz' is [an] old school, hip hop feeling with some drum and bass. It becomes a big, tall monster. It's almost like this big gorilla looking down at you. If he smacks you, he kills you. His fingers are the size of your body. That's kinda what we're doing. We're facing this big monster of, of what we know is out there, of what we see, that big monster of energy.

== Recording and production ==
Spending their own money, N.E.R.D recorded the album at the South Beach Studios in Miami, Florida, and the Record Plant Studios in Los Angeles, California. Williams used a Triton Extreme, Triton Pro and Pro Tools in the production of the album, while Hugo worked in Access Virus TI, Roland JV-1080, JV-2080, XV-5080, TR-808 and TR-909 as beatboxing was provided by Haley. Rock band Spymob further assisted production with guitar and drums. Production revolved around heavy rock, funk and soul music, which was first introduced in their debut album, In Search Of.... Hugo described the album as going back to the band's roots, combining a classic rock sound with a 1970s funk swing. The typical process of recording was described as "Williams arrives at the studio, ideas in full flower, and lays down both a beat (either programmed or played on an assortment of buckets) and vocals." Hugo then would add extra instrumentation. In an interview with MTV, Williams said that the band "didn't care about genres; we're not doing this for the money. We're doing this for people who pledge allegiance to our movement." Hugo went on to say that they "just want to make people move". On the album he said, "We had anger, quiet angst. We had something to get off our chest. And we wanted to show we could do it as a band." Don Was, a musician and record producer, thought that the band was on a creatively fulfilling path, calling their musical style "really innovative".

Williams felt music lacked energy, citing Limp Bizkit's "Nookie" as the last energetic record. Williams suggested his engineer, Andrew Coleman, to "put the drums and bass on the right, keys in the middle, and the mothafucking guitar and backgrounds on the left". Coleman denied his request, saying, "those systems were different back then. If we do that, you'll be in a club and all you will hear on one side of the club is drums and on the other side, just chords."

The Hives' members - Chris Dangerous (drums/percussion), Nicholaus Arson (guitar), Vigilante Carlstroem (guitar), Dr. Matt Destruction (bass) - contributed instrumentals on "Time For Some Action" and "Windows", with The Hives' frontman Howlin' Pelle Almqvist providing guest vocals on "Time For Some Action". On Seeing Sounds they are credited with their real names instead of the pseudonyms they use within the band.

== Promotion ==
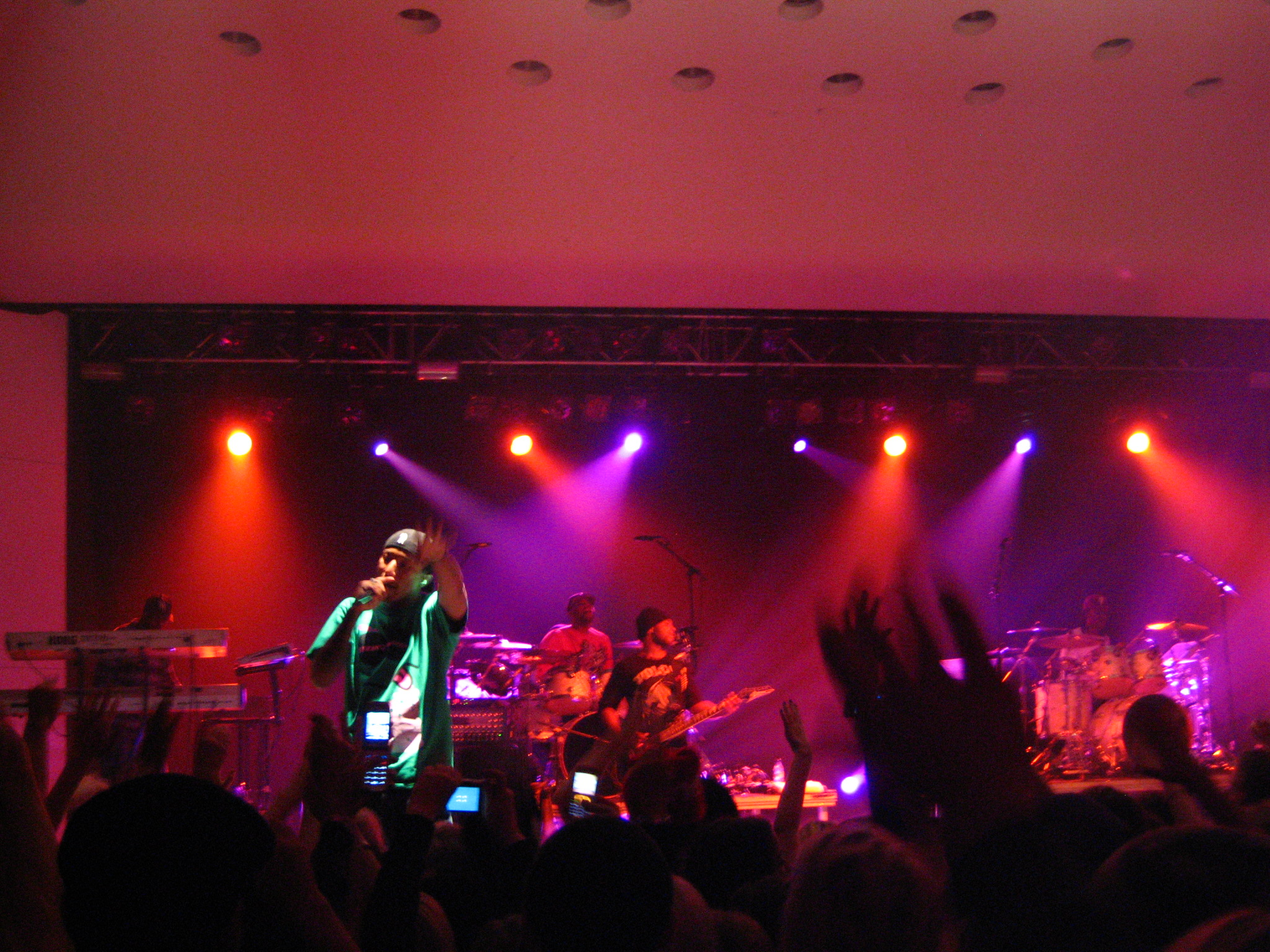
N.E.R.D performing at Kulttuuritalo, Helsinki in December 2008

In promotion of the album, N.E.R.D performed in Kanye West's Glow in the Dark Tour as well as the Isle of Wight Festival. The band also performed at the Austin City Limits festival, where they encouraged fans to dance on stage and urged them to vote in the 2008 United States elections. The song "Spaz" was used for commercials for the Zune Pass. The band performed at Vanderbilt University's Rites of Spring Music Festival in April.

== Reception ==
=== Commercial performance ===
The album debuted at number seven on the U.S. Billboard 200, selling 80,000 copies in its first week. As of 2010, sales in the United States have exceeded 222,000 copies, according to Nielsen SoundScan. It peaked in the top 20 in Australia, Canada, the Netherlands, Switzerland and the United Kingdom, while also charting in the several other regions, including Austria, Belgium, France and Italy.

=== Critical response ===
Professional ratings
Review scores
Source	Rating
Allmusic	3/5 stars
The Austin Chronicle	3/5 stars
The A.V. Club	B
Entertainment Weekly	B+
The Guardian	2/5 stars
Pitchfork Media	4.6/10
PopMatters	7/10
Rolling Stone	3/5 stars
Slant Magazine	3/5 stars
The Times	4/5 stars

Upon its release, the album received generally mixed to positive reviews from most music critics. At Metacritic, which assigns a normalized rating out of 100 to reviews from mainstream critics, the album received an average score of 64, based on 19 reviews, which indicates "generally favorable reviews". Some writers noted and praised the heavy use of electronic, bass and funk beats, while others suggest The Neptunes were unable to blend R&B and rock. Anthony Henriques of PopMatters lauded the production, saying that "their signature drums and spaced-out samples sound as good as ever here", going on to say "[t]he overall balance between live and electronic instrumentation is also the best they have managed on any of the N.E.R.D. albums". He compared the album to M.I.A.'s Kala as "one of the best genre-blurring club records". However, Andy Kellman of Allmusic felt the songs "still have a way of seeming as easy and carefree as the moments when N.E.R.D. are simply bashing away…blowing off steam, and talking ridiculous nonsense". Alexis Petridis of The Guardian pointed out that the songs were "largely about sex", calling it "wearisome". Ian Cohen of Pitchfork Media called the album a "baffling, obnoxious mess". Adrian Ruhi of Okayplayer gave the album a score of 88 out of 100 and called some of the songs "a dynamic mess", but noted it was "a good thing".

Some critics argued that the album was their most consistent and strongest album to date. Christian Hoard of Rolling Stone felt that the album was "experimental and expansive". Sal Cinquemani of Slant Magazine felt that the album lacked "freshness or spontaneity" that was found in the band's debut album, calling only two songs on the album "very visionary". Jim Farber of the Daily News criticized Williams, saying "Even aided by studio correction, the guy can't sing", calling it "bad singing at its engaging best". Cohen of Pitchfork Media bashed the lyrics, saying that the writing was "far down the list of what N.E.R.D. is actually good at". Hoard of Rolling Stone felt he learned nothing from the lyrics except that Williams was sexually aroused. Henriques of PopMatters noted that Williams is not a "technically gifted rapper", he "does not have a beautiful voice" and his lyrics are "typically inconsequential in a 'saying shit just to sound cool' sort of way", but found strengths in his choruses, which he pointed out "typically use a catchy phrase or recognizable melody as an anchor for his nonsensical verses". Dan Charnas of The Washington Post commended N.E.R.D for their songwriting, writing that Seeing Sounds "combines the adolescent and clever". The Times writer Priya Elan gave the album 4 out of 5 stars and wrote that band is "pushing the boundaries of the popular song". In his Consumer Guide, Robert Christgau gave the album a three-star honorable mention and stated, "Beats of course, songs usually, singing barely--especially sincere-type singing"; he also picked out two songs from the album: "Anti-Matter" and "Everyone Nose (All the Girls Standing in the Line for the Bathroom)".

== Track listing ==
#	Title	Writer(s)	Time
1	"Time for Some Action" (Intro)	Pharrell Williams	3:43
2	"Everyone Nose (All the Girls Standing in the Line for the Bathroom)"	Williams; Chad Hugo	3:27
3	"Windows"	Williams	2:59
4	"Anti Matter"	Williams; Hugo	4:01
5	"Spaz"	Williams	3:51
6	"Yeah You"	Williams	4:07
7	"Sooner or Later"	Williams	6:43
8	"Happy"	Williams	4:36
9	"Kill Joy"	Williams	4:10
10	"Love Bomb"	Williams; Hugo	4:36
11	"You Know What"	Williams	4:31
12	"Laugh About It"	Williams	4:04
*	"Lazer Gun" (United Kingdom and Japan bonus track)	Williams	3:52
*	"Everyone Nose (All the Girls Standing in the Line for the Bathroom) [Remix]" (featuring Kanye West, Lupe Fiasco and Pusha T) (iTunes and Zune Marketplace bonus track)	Williams; Hugo; Kanye West; Wasalu Jaco; Terrence Thornton	3:48

== Personnel ==
- Davis A. Barnett – viola
- Andrew Coleman – engineer
- Eric Fawcett – drums, background vocals
- Larry Gold – conductor, string arrangements
- Bernie Grundman – mastering
- Hart Gunther – assistant
- Mike Larson – assistant, background vocals
- Femio Hernández – assistant
- Jun Hirota – package design, booklet design
- Mike Hogue – assistant
- Chad Hugo – horn, keyboards
- Chris Kasych – assistant
- Emma Kummrow – violin
- Jennie Lorenzo – cello
- Peter Nocella – viola
- Charles Parker – violin
- Brent Paschke – guitar
- Neal H. Pogue – engineer, mixing
- John Stahl – assistant
- Igor Szwec – violin
- Gregory Teperman – violin
- Javier Valverde – assistant

== Charts ==
=== Weekly charts ===
Chart (2008)	Peak position
Australian Albums (ARIA)	14
Austrian Albums (Ö3 Austria)	75
Belgian Albums (Ultratop Flanders)	35
Belgian Albums (Ultratop Wallonia)	86
Canadian Albums (Billboard)	12
Dutch Albums (Album Top 100)	14
European Top 100 Albums	28
French Albums (SNEP)	45
German Albums (Offizielle Top 100)	65
Irish Albums (IRMA)	60
Italian Albums (FIMI)	97
Scottish Albums (Official Charts)	41
Swiss Albums (Schweizer Hitparade)	13
UK Albums (Official Charts)	20
US Billboard 200	7
US Top R&B/Hip-Hop Albums (Billboard)	4

=== Year-end charts ===
Chart (2008)	Position
US Top R&B/Hip-Hop Albums (Billboard)	76

== Release history ==
Region	Date
Belgium	June 6, 2008
Germany	June 6, 2008
Switzerland	June 6, 2008
France	June 9, 2008
United Kingdom	June 9, 2008
Canada	June 10, 2008
United States	June 10, 2008
Japan	June 11, 2008
