= So Many Pros =

Single by Snoop Dogg

from the album Bush
- Released: April 14, 2015
- Recorded: 2014–15
- Genre: West Coast hip hop; funk
- Length: 4:06
- Label: I Am Other; Columbia
- Songwriters: Calvin Broadus; Pharrell Williams
- Producer: The Neptunes

Snoop Dogg singles chronology
"Peaches N Cream" (2015)	"So Many Pros" (2015)	"California Roll" (2015)

"So Many Pros" is a song by American hip hop recording artist Snoop Dogg, featuring uncredited vocals by Charlie Wilson, The Neptunes and Rhea Dummett. It was released on April 14, 2015 as the second single from his thirteenth studio album Bush, through the record labels I Am Other and Columbia Records. The song was produced by The Neptunes.

On The Graham Norton Show in May 2015, Snoop revealed that Pharrell Williams made him change the title of the song from "So Many Hoes" to "So Many Pros."

== Background ==
The track "So Many Pros" was originally a track recorded by Timbaland and featured Pharrell Williams & Justin Timberlake, however, due to Timbaland's album being cancelled Pharrell re-worked the final track, in which Chad Hugo, Charlie Wilson, Pharrell & Rhea Dummett feature on backing vocals. A video was also shot for "Been It", with amateur footage showing Timberlake recording his portion of the music video whilst on The 20/20 Experience World Tour and Timbaland recording his portion on a beach with scantily clad models. The lyrics to the song seem to have remained unchanged, however the lyric "...so many hoes" has been changed to "...so many pros" which is the title of the track itself.

== Music video ==
Snoop released the official video on April 14, 2015, to VEVO. The music video was directed by François Rousselet.

At the 2015 MTV Video Music Awards, the music video won the award for Best Art Direction.

== Commercial performance ==
"So Many Pros" debuted at number 47 on the United States Billboard Twitter Top Tracks chart dated May 2, 2015. Internationally the song peaking at number 169 in French SNEP chart.

== Awards and nominations ==
Year	Awards Ceremony	Award	Results
2015	MTV Video Music Award	Best Art Direction	Won

== Track listing ==
- Download digital
1. So Many Pros — 4:06

== Personnel ==
Adapted from the credits as seen in the end of the video:

- Produced - The Neptunes
- Recorded - Andrew Coleman and Mike Larson
- Mixed - Mick Guzauski
- Background Vocals - Charlie Wilson, Chad Hugo, Pharrell Williams and Rhea Dummett
- Guitar - Brent Paschke

== Charts ==
Chart (2015)	Peak position
France (SNEP)	169

== Release history ==
Region	Date	Format	Label	Ref.
United States	April 14, 2015	Digital download	Doggystyle; Columbia	
Europe	April 16, 2015	Digital download	Doggystyle; Columbia	
Italy	May 1, 2015	Airplay	Doggystyle; Columbia	
