= Lemon (N.E.R.D. and Rihanna song) =

2018 single by N.E.R.D.

Single by N.E.R.D. and Rihanna

from the album No One Ever Really Dies
- Released: November 1, 2017
- Recorded: 2017
- Studio: South Beach Studios (Miami Beach, FL); Conway Recording Studios (Los Angeles, CA); Jungle City Studios (New York, NY); The Lunchtable (Los Angeles, CA); Chalice Recording Studios (Los Angeles, CA)
- Genre: Hyphy
- Length: 3:39 (single version); 3:07 (radio edit); 2:27 (w/out first verse)
- Label: Columbia
- Songwriters: Pharrell Williams; Robyn Fenty
- Producers: Pharrell Williams; Kuk Harrell

N.E.R.D. singles chronology
"Hypnotize U" (2010)	"Lemon" (2017)	"1000" (2017)

Rihanna singles chronology
"Loyalty" (2017)	"Lemon" (2017)	"Believe It" (2020)

Music video
- "Lemon" on YouTube

"Lemon" is a song by American band N.E.R.D. from their fifth studio album, No One Ever Really Dies (2017). The song features vocals from Barbadian singer Rihanna, and it was released as the album's lead single on November 1, 2017.

Former Pennsylvania U.S. Senator Arlen Specter is sampled in the song as the man saying "wait a minute."

Several alternate versions of the songs were produced, including a version without the Rihanna feature (which sees Pharrell rapping a similar verse), a radio edit, and an edited version submitted to streaming services that omits Pharrell's first verse. The remix featuring Drake was released on March 17, 2018.

== Music video ==
The music video for "Lemon" was uploaded to N.E.R.D.'s Vevo page on YouTube on November 1, 2017. The video was directed by Todd Tourso and Scott Cudmore, and produced by Stacey Thiel and stars dancer Mette Towley.

== Track listing ==
Digital download
No.	Title	Length
1.	"Lemon"	3:39

Digital download
No.	Title	Length
1.	"Lemon" (edit)	2:26

7" vinyl
No.	Title	Length
1.	"Lemon (N.E.R.D. and Rihanna)"
2.	"Lemon (N.E.R.D.)"

== Charts ==
=== Weekly charts ===
Chart (2017–18)	Peak position
Australia (ARIA)	44
Belgium (Ultratip Bubbling Under Flanders)	7
Canada Hot 100 (Billboard)	33
Colombia (National-Report)	80
Ireland (IRMA)	51
Israel International TV Airplay (Media Forest)	7
Japan Hot 100 (Billboard)	99
Netherlands (Single Top 100)	87
Portugal (AFP)	78
Romania (Airplay 100)	93
Scottish Singles Sales (Official Charts)	30
Slovakia Singles Digital (ČNS IFPI)	94
Switzerland (Schweizer Hitparade)	59
UK Singles (Official Charts)	31
UK Hip Hop/R&B (Official Charts)	14
US Billboard Hot 100	36
US Dance Club Songs (Billboard)	23
US Hot R&B/Hip-Hop Songs (Billboard)	16
US Pop Airplay (Billboard)	22
US Rhythmic Airplay (Billboard)	1

=== Year-end charts ===
Chart (2018)	Position
US Billboard Hot 100	83
US Hot R&B/Hip-Hop Songs (Billboard)	42
US Rhythmic (Billboard)	25
US Rap Songs (Billboard)	36

== Certifications ==
Region	Certification	Certified units/sales
Australia (ARIA)	Platinum	70,000^{‡}
Canada (Music Canada)	2× Platinum	160,000^{‡}
New Zealand (RMNZ)	2× Platinum	60,000^{‡}
Poland (ZPAV)	Gold	10,000^{‡}
United Kingdom (BPI)	Gold	400,000^{‡}
United States (RIAA)	3× Platinum	3,000,000^{‡}
^{‡} Sales+streaming figures based on certification alone.

== Release history ==
Region	Date	Format	Version	Label	Ref.
United States	November 1, 2017	Digital download	Original	Columbia	
Italy	November 2, 2017	Contemporary hit radio	Original	Sony	
United States	November 7, 2017	Rhythmic contemporary	Radio Edit	Sony; Columbia	
United States	November 19, 2017	Contemporary hit radio	Radio Edit	Sony; Columbia	
United Kingdom	December 1, 2017	Contemporary hit radio	Original	Columbia; Sony; i am OTHER	
United Kingdom	December 1, 2017	Digital download	Radio Edit	Columbia	

== Drake remix ==
"Lemon (Drake Remix)"

Single by N.E.R.D. and Rihanna featuring Drake
- Released: March 17, 2018
- Length: 3:46
- Label: Columbia
- Songwriters: Pharrell Williams; Robyn Fenty; Aubrey Graham
- Producers: Pharrell Williams; Kuk Harrell

N.E.R.D. singles chronology
"Don't Don't Do It" (2018)	"Lemon (Drake Remix)" (2018)

Drake singles chronology
"Look Alive" (2018)	"Lemon (Remix)" (2018)	"Walk It Talk It" (2018)

The official remix, titled the "Drake Remix", featuring Canadian rapper Drake was premiered on Episode 58 of OVO Sound Radio and made available for purchase on March 17, 2018.

=== Chart performance ===
The remix charted on RMNZ's New Zealand chart, peaking at number 37.

=== Track listing ===
Digital download – Drake remix
No.	Title	Length
1.	"Lemon" (Drake remix) (featuring Drake)	3:46

=== Charts ===
Chart (2018)	Peak position
New Zealand (Recorded Music NZ)	37

=== Certifications ===
Region	Certification	Certified units/sales
New Zealand (RMNZ)	Gold	15,000^{‡}
^{‡} Sales+streaming figures based on certification alone.

=== Release history ===
Region	Date	Format	Label	Ref.
United States	March 17, 2018	Digital download	Columbia	
Australia	March 23, 2018	Contemporary hit radio	Universal Music Australia	
