= Everyone Nose (All the Girls Standing in the Line for the Bathroom) =

Single by N.E.R.D.

from the album Seeing Sounds
- B-side: "Spaz"
- Released: May 13, 2008
- Genre: Hip-hop
- Length: 3:27
- Label: Interscope
- Songwriters: Pharrell Williams; Charles Hugo
- Producer: The Neptunes

N.E.R.D. singles chronology
"Maybe" (2004)	"Everyone Nose (All the Girls Standing in the Line for the Bathroom)" (2008)	"Spaz" (2008)

Music video
- "Everyone Nose (All the Girls Standing in the Line for the Bathroom)" on YouTube

"Everyone Nose (All the Girls Standing in the Line for the Bathroom)" is a song by American band N.E.R.D. It is the lead single from their third studio album Seeing Sounds and was released on May 13, 2008. Lyrically, the song delves into the issue of women socially snorting cocaine in bathrooms. The song was accompanied by music video, which was directed by Diane Martel. A video for the remix of the song featuring Kanye West, Lupe Fiasco, and Pusha T of Clipse was also filmed and directed by Hype Williams.

"Everyone Nose" received generally favorable reviews from music critics. N.E.R.D. promoted the song through numerous tours and festivals. The song failed to chart in the United States, but peaked at number 17 on the Japan Hot 100 Singles and at number 41 on the UK Singles Chart.

== Composition ==
"Everyone Nose" was written by Pharrell Williams and Chad Hugo, who also produced the song as The Neptunes. The title of the song derives from the subject of women snorting cocaine socially in bathrooms, and the song's lyrics delve into the issue. N.E.R.D. attested that, "when the girls go in the bathroom, they're powdering their faces with that other white stuff." Andrew Coleman, the band's engineer, explained the song's bridge, saying it is the "breakdown" of the girl: "you can imagine a girl who is totally coked out of her mind dancing and sweating."

In midst of working with Missy Elliott, Williams was shown a video of people dancing to Baltimore house music. He "lost his mind, the way these people were dancing and these crazy beats," which inspired the beat for "Everyone Nose." The song begins with a Roland 5080 acoustic bass guitar and continues with drums provided by a Triton Extreme. He went on to say that, "Timbaland is scratching in there, too. The big Latin section is again, all Pharrell—all the same instruments; he just flipped the programming. That is the Latin club explosion part, mostly programmed beats with some buckets."

== Remix ==
N.E.R.D. produced a remix featuring Williams' Child Rebel Soldier cohorts Kanye West and Lupe Fiasco, as well as Pusha T of Clipse, which was available as an iTunes and Zune Marketplace bonus track with the purchase of Seeing Sounds. When asked why the song was remixed, Hugo replied with, "We wanted something with more of a straight-ahead, club-bumping beat, just a different take on it. We like to remix, dismantle, take apart shit and put it back together. It's just like a Rubik's Cube: When you can't solve it, you just break it and you put it back together." Williams added, "We think that 'Everyone Nose' in its current form already hits a certain demographic a certain way, so I just wanted to go and do something different."

== Critical reception ==
Christian Hoard of Rolling Stone claimed that the song would be "destined to go down as [one] of 2008's most interesting hip-hop cuts." Addi Stewart of Now magazine said the song "is straight groovy, baby!" Many praised the beat; Nick Levine of Digital Spy said, "It's a triumph of beats over melody, but few would deny that those beats sound pretty good as they're dropping." The Daily Mirror described the beat as "nicely buffeted electropop", noting its "trickily timed beats, synthesised horns and playful vocal jousting". Scott Lowe of IGN said the song featured an "intriguing jazzy beat layered over pounding bass". Others panned the song's sound and lyrics, saying Williams "lampoons partygoing cokeheads by sounding like Baha Men after five too many rails" and that the lyrics were "about as shallow and trite as an inflatable kiddy swimming pool, but less fun".

The remix has also garnered positive reviews; Lowe noted that "Kanye West, Lupe Fiasco, and Pusha T make an appearance on a somewhat more enjoyable remixed version of [the song]", which added a "nice outside perspective to the otherwise tiresome track". Tom Breihan of The Village Voice called the remix "pretty great" compared to the "horrible hammering" of the original song. He criticized West's lyrics, saying he was "back to talking about girls on his verse again […] without any of the humane warmth he used to sometimes bring." The song was number 32 on Rolling Stone's list of the 100 Best Songs of 2008.

In response to the positive reception from listeners, Williams said, "We love the reaction that we get [from that song]. They know what we're talking about." Shay Haley, a member of the band, went on saying, "Me, personally, I'm shocked it's being embraced the way it is. I feel like it sticks out like a sore thumb in comparison to what you hear every day on the radio… It's just our personal observation of what we've seen over the past couple of years, so we felt like making a party record out of it."

== Live performances ==
N.E.R.D. promoted the song by performing it in several tours and festivals, including the Austin City Limits Music Festival and the Diesel Bash. Toby Green of The Guardian attended a concert at The Roundhouse in London and gave the performance four out of five stars, saying "Pharrell's knack is connecting with the crowd. Many bands tell the audience they want to party with them, but N.E.R.D seem to mean it."

== Music video ==
Williams contacted the T.A.G. ad agency to record an interactive video to create an "integrated campaign" in order to "hype" the single. The music video for "Everyone Nose" was directed by Diane Martel and co-directed by T.A.G, in collaboration with photo website Last Night's Party. It was filmed at a nightclub in Madison, New York, with 100 guests as an "orgiastic party" video, in addition to cameos by Kanye West, Lindsay Lohan, Samantha Ronson and a young SZA. During the filming of the music video, a fight broke out on set and threatened to halt recording of the video. The outbreak resulted in one person being sent to a nearby hospital for medical treatment. N.E.R.D., West, and Lohan were not on set at the time of the altercation. Due to the lack of security and believing their safety was compromised, members of the trade union "threatened to walk off the set" before being persuaded to stay.

A large dancing nose and nude strippers were set to appear in the video, but were censored with "removed by request" slates. Because the lyrics dealt with cocaine, MTV initially did not air "Everyone Nose". MTV softened after their website was visited 5,000 times, and they played a censored version of the music video without the URL. Rebecca Skinner of HSI Productions criticized MTV, saying, "All artists want their videos to be seen on as many platforms as possible. However MTV is not what [it] used to be—yet another reason why the online component to this is important."

The 1980s video-game graphics in the music video of the remix

A music video for the remix of "Everyone Nose" featuring Kanye West, Lupe Fiasco, and Pusha T was filmed in July and directed by Hype Williams. It features video game graphics from the 1980s. Williams explained that, "We just want to have fun with the project. In a day and age where the record industry is what it is, I'm lucky enough to be on a label that understands and they'll just let us have fun."

== Track listings ==
Digital single

1. "Everyone Nose (All the Girls Standing in the Line for the Bathroom)" – 3:49

United Kingdom CD single

1. "Everyone Nose (All the Girls Standing in the Line for the Bathroom)" – 3:27
2. "Spaz" – 3:50

Remix single

1. "Everyone Nose" (remix) (clean) feat. Kanye West, Lupe Fiasco and Pusha T – 3:53
2. "Everyone Nose" (remix) (instrumental) – 3:49
3. "Everyone Nose" (remix) feat. Kanye West, Lupe Fiasco and Pusha T – 3:53

== Charts ==
Chart (2008)	Peak position
Australia (ARIA)	69
Belgium (Ultratip Bubbling Under Flanders)	15
Belgium (Ultratip Bubbling Under Wallonia)	24
Japan Hot 100 Singles	17
UK Singles Chart	41
