= California Roll (song) =

Single by Snoop Dogg featuring Stevie Wonder

from the album Bush
- Released: May 5, 2015
- Recorded: 2014–15
- Genre: West Coast hip hop; Soul; R&B
- Length: 4:12
- Label: i am OTHER; Columbia
- Songwriters: Calvin Broadus; Pharrell Williams; James Fauntleroy
- Producer: The Neptunes

Snoop Dogg singles chronology
"So Many Pros" (2015)	"California Roll" (2015)	"My Cutie Pie" (2015)

Stevie Wonder singles chronology
"All About the Love Again" (2009)	"California Roll" (2015)	"Faith" (2016)

Pharrell Williams singles chronology
"It Girl" (2014)	"California Roll" (2015)	"Freedom" (2015)

"California Roll" is a song by American rapper Snoop Dogg, featuring vocals from fellow American musicians Stevie Wonder and Pharrell Williams, the latter of whom goes uncredited, but produced the song alongside Chad Hugo as The Neptunes. It was released on May 5, 2015 as the third and final single from Snoop Dogg's thirteenth studio album Bush (2015), with the record labels i am OTHER and Columbia Records. Williams is credited as a co-writer of the song, along with Snoop Dogg and James Fauntleroy. The song cover art features model Afiya Bennett.

== Music video ==
The official music video for the single was uploaded to VEVO May 5, 2015. It was directed by Warren Fu. In the video, a group of African Americans in 1940s Los Angeles, in a movie theater to see the (fictional) film California Roll: A Flight to the Future, find that the film is more like a ride, with seat belts required, and narrated by a talking robot. The film/ride shows a retrofuturistic Los Angeles, with flying vintage cars and Ancient Egyptian elements. (The film-within-a-film also includes brief product placement for the Sony Xperia Z3 phone.) One audience member, played by Nia Long, is surprised to see drawings of her within the film; she then ends up inside the film, alongside Snoop Dogg in the 1940s Buick-style flying car he is driving. At the end of the video, as the other audience members rise up to leave, it is clear that she has remained within the futuristic world.

The video's concept was a collaborative effort: it was Fu's idea to show a ride through LA, Williams' idea to have it set in an Egyptian-style future, and Snoop Dogg's to have the audience be from the 1940s.

== Commercial performance ==
The single debuted at number 49 on the US R&B/Hip-Hop Songs chart, becoming Snoop's 70th entry on the chart.

== Track listing ==
- Download digital
1. California Roll (featuring Stevie Wonder) — 4:12

== Chart performance ==
=== Weekly charts ===
Chart (2015)	Peak position
Belgium (Ultratop 50 Flanders)	22
France (SNEP)	140
Mexico Ingles Airplay (Billboard)	47
Netherlands (Dutch Single Tip)	27
US Adult R&B Songs (Billboard)	20
US Hot R&B/Hip-Hop Songs (Billboard)	49
US Hot R&B Songs (Billboard)	15

== Release history ==
Region	Date	Format	Label	Ref.
United States	May 5, 2015	Digital download	Doggystyle; Columbia	
Europe	May 7, 2015	Digital download	Doggystyle; Columbia	
