= N.E.R.D. =

American rock and hip-hop band

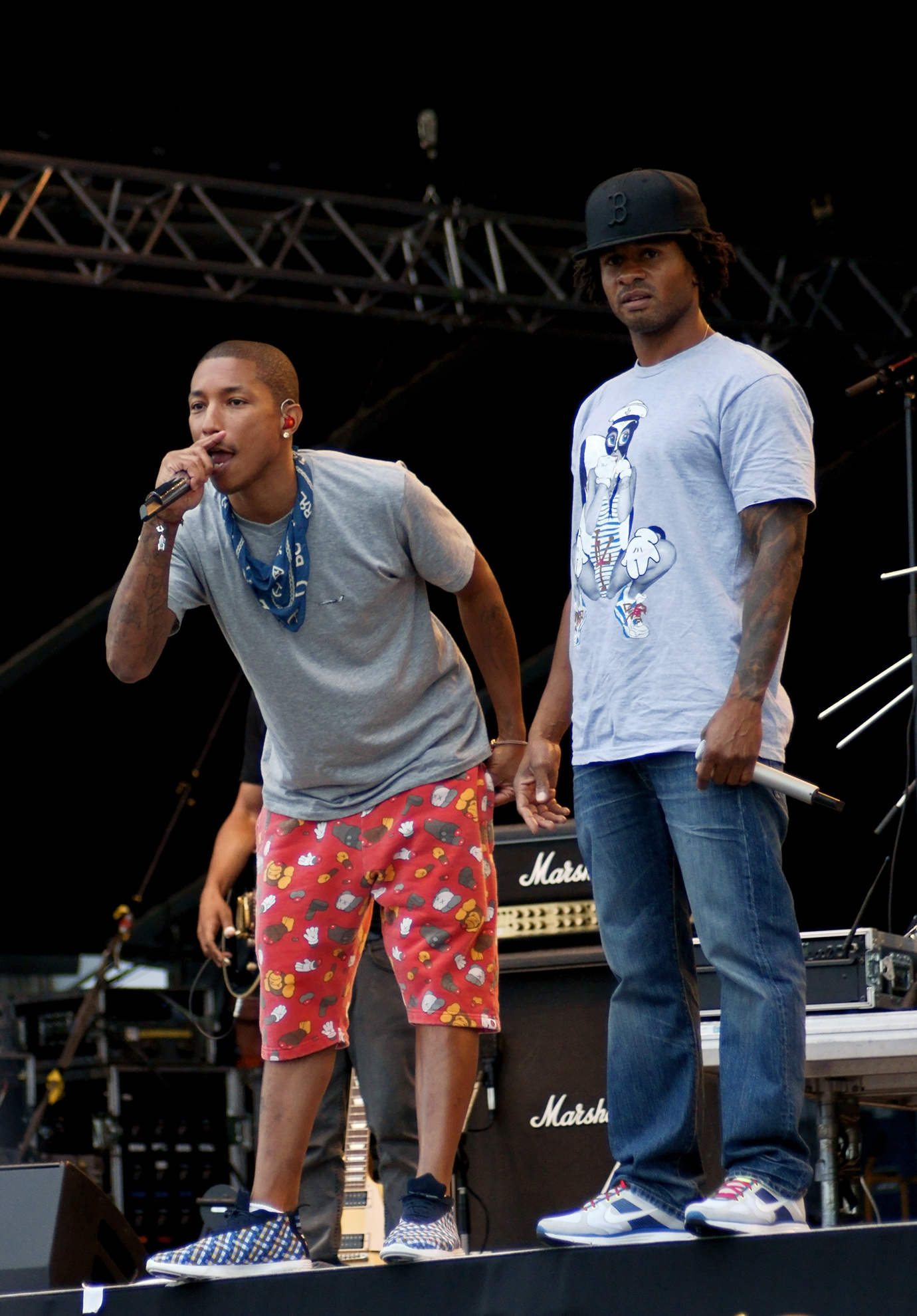
- Pharrell Williams (left) and Shay Haley from N.E.R.D. performing at Pori Jazz in 2010

Background information
- Origin: Virginia Beach, Virginia, U.S.
- Genres: Funk rock; alternative rock; alternative hip-hop
- Years active: 1994–2005; 2008–2018
- Labels: I Am Other; Columbia; Virgin; Star Trak; Interscope
- Spinoff of: The Neptunes
- Past members: Pharrell Williams; Chad Hugo; Shay Haley
- Website: nooneeverreallydies.com

N.E.R.D. (Note: Stylized as N⋆E⋆R⋆D, N.E.R.D, N*E*R*D, and NER*D) (a backronym of No-one Ever Really Dies) was an American rock and hip-hop band, formed in Virginia Beach, Virginia, in 1994. Pharrell Williams and Chad Hugo were signed by Teddy Riley to Virgin Records. After producing songs for several artists during the early 1990s, Williams and Hugo formed the band with Shay Haley, as a side project of the Neptunes, in 1994.

N.E.R.D.'s debut album, In Search of... (2001), received gold certification by the Recording Industry Association of America (RIAA) and was awarded the second annual Shortlist Music Prize. The band's second album, Fly or Die (2004), also received gold certification.

In 2005, N.E.R.D. ended their contract with Virgin and disbanded. Three years later, the band reunited under Star Trak Entertainment, a subsidiary of Interscope Records, established by Williams and Hugo. The band's third album, Seeing Sounds (2008), sold under 80,000 copies in its first week. The album was followed by Nothing (2010).

After a hiatus, the band signed with Columbia Records to release their 2017 single "Lemon" (with Rihanna). The song peaked within the top 40 of the Billboard Hot 100 and preceded the band's fifth and final album, No One Ever Really Dies (2017).

== History ==
=== Formation and early career ===
Pharrell Williams and Chad Hugo met at the age of 12 at a band class in Virginia Beach, Virginia. Hugo was the drum major for the Kempsville High School Marching Chiefs, under the direction of current University of Virginia Band Director, William Pease, while Williams was a drumline member of the Fabulous Marching Cavaliers (FMC) of Princess Anne High School, both of Virginia Beach. They spent their free time making beats and performing in groups with fellow childhood friends Missy Elliott, Clipse, and Timbaland & Magoo. Williams and Hugo met Shay Haley in high school and began performing together. The trio often met in Hugo's garage, where he beatboxed through a speaker system while Haley danced. After watching the duo perform at a high school talent show, producer Teddy Riley signed Williams and Hugo in 1991. After producing songs for several artists throughout the late 1990s and early 2000s, the production duo formed N.E.R.D. in 1994 as a side project known for their appearance on "Ghetto Children" off Kelis' debut album Kaleidoscope.

=== 2001–2004: In Search of... and Fly or Die ===
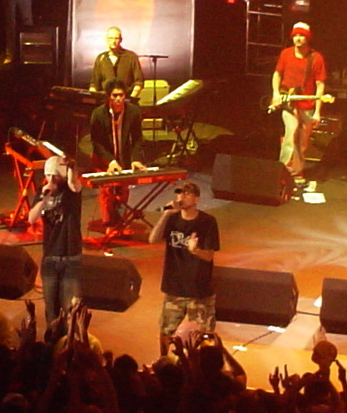
N.E.R.D. performing in April 2003

The band's debut album, In Search of..., was released in Europe in September 2001. Williams and Hugo used similar digital production techniques as they did for other artists. However, the band decided that they wanted to sound different from their previous work. This led them to rerecording the album using live instruments with rock band Spymob for a worldwide release in 2002. The album debuted at number 61 on the Billboard 200 and peaked at number 56. It failed to replicate the success of the Neptunes' previous productions. The album won the second annual Shortlist Music Prize, an accolade awarded to albums released in the United States that have not achieved mainstream success and have sales of 500,000 copies or less at the time of nomination. The album sold 603,000 copies in the United States and was certified Gold by the RIAA. The album's lead single, "Lapdance", peaked at number 36 of the Hot Rap Tracks chart and number 85 on the Hot R&B/Hip-Hop Songs. The second single, "Rock Star", peaked at number 36 on the Billboard Hot Modern Rock Tracks chart. A 6.1 surround mix of this album was released by DTS Entertainment on a DVD-Audio disc in 2005.

The band recorded its second album, Fly or Die, in 2003. They learned to play the songs live, as Chad Hugo told MTV News on December 9, 2003: "We're the ones playing the instruments live this time. I just started playing guitar last year so I'm learning as we go. Pharrell's playing drums. [Last time] we didn't have time to learn certain instruments so we got Spymob to help us out."

Fly or Die was released in March 2004. The album debuted at number six on the Billboard 200, selling 119,000 copies in its first week. The album sold 412,000 copies in the United States and was certified Gold by the RIAA. The first single, "She Wants to Move", has gone top 5 in the United Kingdom, top 20 in Norway, Ireland, and Denmark, and top 40 in Australia and the Netherlands. The music videos for "She Wants to Move" and its follow-up single, "Maybe", have received strong support from the digital cable network VH1 Soul in America.

=== 2005–2008: Hiatus and Seeing Sounds ===
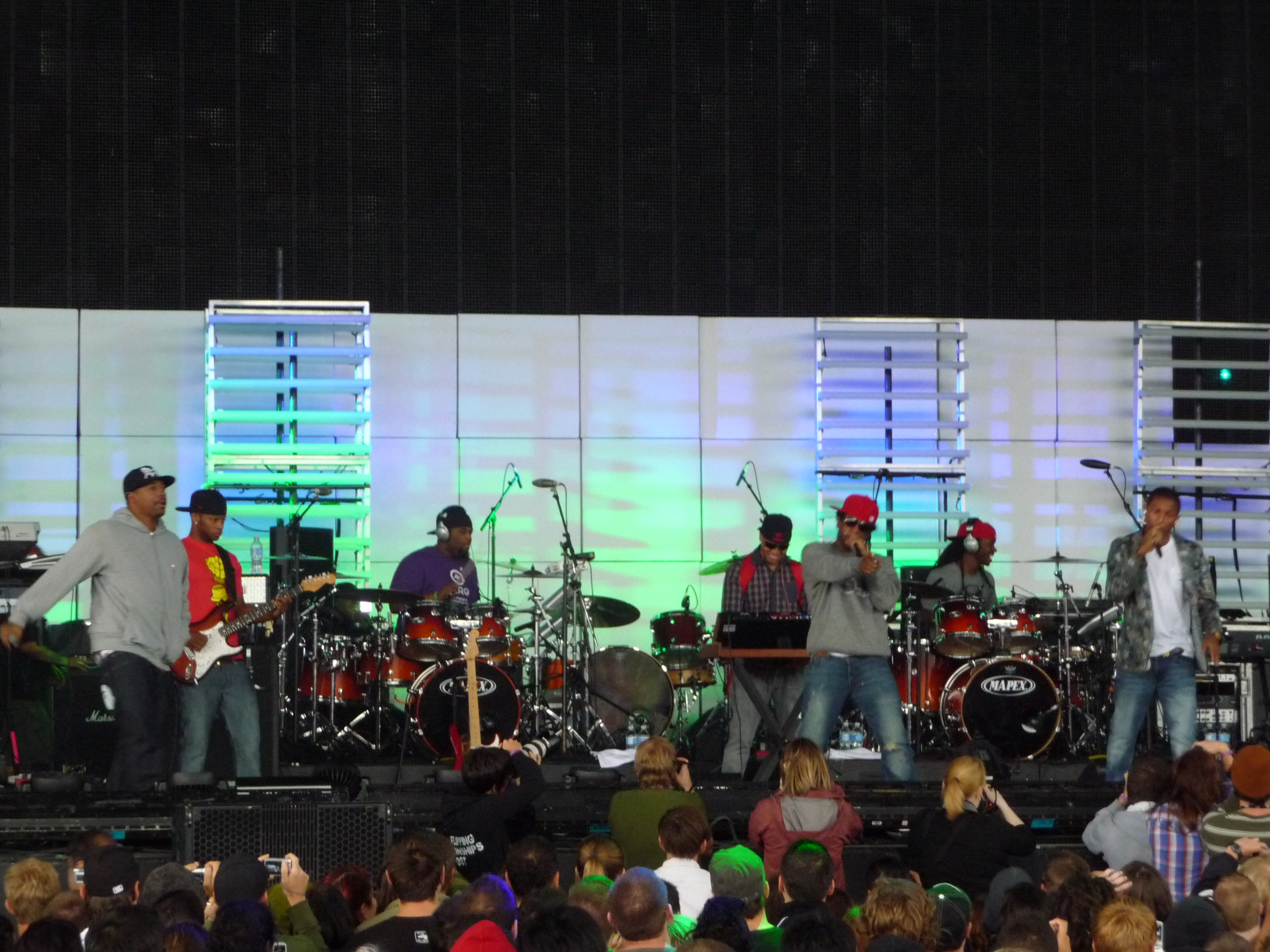
N.E.R.D. performing in 2009

In 2005, N.E.R.D. ended their contract with Virgin Records over a label dispute and the band disbanded. While touring, the band became "hooked" on the energy from their fans, which led them to begin recording their third studio album, spending their own money while still unsigned. Williams and Hugo later established Star Trak Entertainment, a subsidiary of Interscope Records. In March 2008, the band performed at South by Southwest in Austin, Texas. While there they filmed a PSA for Rock the Vote saying why they thought voting was important and the issues they cared about that election year.

From April to June 2008, the band toured with Kanye West as an opening act along with Rihanna and Lupe Fiasco as part of the Glow in the Dark Tour. On June 13, they gave an energetic performance at the Isle of Wight festival, however they almost missed their scheduled show because they didn't know where the island was. On June 25, they performed in front of 40,000 people at the Isle of MTV 2008 at the Floriana Granaries, Malta with free admission. On August 9, 2008, the band played at the Way Out West music festival held in the city park of Gothenburg, Sweden. In September 2008, N.E.R.D. performed to a sold-out crowd at the House of Blues in Chicago, Illinois, and brought special guest Bad Brains onstage.

N.E.R.D. released their third studio album, Seeing Sounds in June 2008. The first single off the album, titled "Everyone Nose (All the Girls Standing in the Line for the Bathroom)", was first mentioned on their Billionaire Boys Club blog in January 2008. The second single off the album, titled "Spaz", was used in a television commercial for the Microsoft Zune. The group toured with American rock band, Linkin Park on the European leg of their Projekt Revolution tour in 2008 with artists like HIM, the Used and Jay-Z. The group also played at the National Bowl, Milton Keynes before the recording of Road to Revolution by Linkin Park.

=== 2009–present: Nothing and No One Ever Really Dies ===
In 2009, a song entitled "Soldier" featuring Santigold and Lil Wayne was featured on the soundtrack of the teen drama series 90210. In 2010, N.E.R.D. announced the release of their fourth studio album entitled Nothing, which had a scheduled release date for September 7, 2010, but was pushed back to November 2, 2010. The first single from the album, "Hot-n-Fun" (featuring Nelly Furtado), was released on May 18, 2010, on iTunes. It was released in the United Kingdom on August 30, 2010. On August 20, 2010, a track titled "Party People" leaked onto the internet. It was rumored to be the second single from the album. On September 28, 2010, they premiered another track from the album titled "Hypnotize U", produced by electronic music duo Daft Punk, on Late Show with David Letterman. On September 30, 2010, in an interview with Mark Hoppus on A Different Spin with Mark Hoppus, Williams explained the album cover as "a mix of so many things. The feathers represent the peace, and the helmet represents the war. It's like where we are right now. There's a lot of war, that people can't necessarily explain. The economy sucks, girls are still beautiful. We wanted to make music that reflected that. So people can look back twenty years from now, and say 'this is what was going on'". They then announced in the interview that the next two singles would be "I've Seen the Light" and "Hypnotize U".

Williams described "Hypnotize U" as being "so different from the rest of the album", stating he was "very pleased because it serves a different purpose" in the album. On October 17, 2010, the standard edition and the deluxe edition of the album became available for pre-order on iTunes. It was later announced that they would support Gorillaz on the North American leg of their 2010 Escape to Plastic Beach Tour. In 2013, Williams confirmed an N.E.R.D. album was in progress, but also mentioned that the album would not be released that year due to the projects he was working on with other artists. He has also said the album will be "nature-based". The group reunited on December 26, 2014, to release the songs "Squeeze Me", "Patrick Star", and "Sandy Squirrel" for the film The SpongeBob Movie: Sponge Out of Water.

N.E.R.D.'s fifth album, No One Ever Really Dies, was released on December 15, 2017, through I Am Other and Columbia Records. It features guest appearances from André 3000, M.I.A., Gucci Mane, Wale, and Ed Sheeran among others. It was preceded by three singles; "Lemon" with Rihanna (on November 1), "1000" with Future (on November 29), and "Don't Don't Do It!" with Kendrick Lamar (on December 13). The group did shows throughout 2018 such as the Nickelodeon Kids' Choice Awards and the Reading and Leeds Festivals. They also released a popular remix to "Lemon" with Drake. In 2024, Hugo filed a legal action against Williams.

== Musical style ==
The band's sound generally contains elements of rock, funk and hip-hop, while also encompassing R&B and pop. Their sound has also been described as featuring funk rock, alternative hip-hop, rap rock, experimental hip-hop, avant-funk, and progressive pop. They have been praised for their heavy use of electronic, bass and funk beats, while others have suggested that the Neptunes are unable to blend R&B and rock.

N.E.R.D.'s lyrics have been criticized. Ian Cohen of Pitchfork called the band's lyrical writing ability "far down the list of what N.E.R.D is actually good at", where Williams is often criticized for being excessively sexual. With the release of Fly or Die, the album was advertised in Kerrang! magazine, which made Alexis Petridis of The Guardian feel that N.E.R.D.'s lyrics tried to "empathize with the alienated teenagers who make up Kerrang!'s readership".

== Band members ==
- Pharrell Williams – lead vocals, piano, keyboards, drums, percussion, programming
- Chad Hugo – guitars, piano, keyboards, saxophone, bass guitar, programming, keytar, turntables, backing vocals
- Shay Haley – drums, percussion, bass guitar, backing and co-lead vocals

=== Touring members ===
- Thaddaeus Tribbett – bass guitar
- James Darrell Robinson – drums, percussion
- Junius Bervine – keyboards
- Brent Paschke – guitars
- DJ Jus Ske – turntables

==== Dancers ====
- Eddie Eskridge
- Jesse Sanchez
- Angelo Saunders
- Mette Towley
- Kenitia Coleman
- Natsuki Miya

== Discography ==
=== Studio albums ===
List of studio albums, with selected chart positions
Title	Album details	Peak chart positions										Sales	Certifications
Title	Album details	US	AUS	FRA	GER	IRE	ITA	NZ	SWE	SWI	UK	Sales	Certifications
In Search Of...	Released: August 6, 2001; Label: Star Trak, Virgin; Format: CD, LP, DVD-A	56	70	—	—	27	—	—	17	—	28	US: 603,000	RIAA: Gold; BPI: Platinum
Fly or Die	Released: March 23, 2004; Label: Star Trak, Virgin; Format: CD, LP	6	11	31	20	12	10	22	9	27	4	US: 412,000	RIAA: Gold; ARIA: Gold; IRMA: Gold
Seeing Sounds	Released: June 10, 2008; Label: Star Trak, Interscope; Format: CD, LP, DI	7	14	45	65	60	97	—	—	13	20		
Nothing	Released: November 2, 2010; Label: Star Trak, Interscope; Format: CD, LP, DI	21	55	43	—	—	—	—	—	32	83		
No One Ever Really Dies	Released: December 15, 2017; Label: I Am Other, Columbia; Format: CD, LP, DI	31	58	92	—	—	—	—	—	65	80		
"—" denotes a recording that did not chart or was not released in that territory.

=== Singles ===
List of singles, with selected chart positions
Title	Year	Peak chart positions										Certifications	Album
Title	Year	US	US R&B	US Dance	AUS	BEL (Fla)	ITA	NLD	SWE	SWI	UK	Certifications	Album
"Lapdance" (featuring Lee Harvey and Vita)	2001	—	85	—	—	—	—	56	47	—	20 (Note: "Lapdance" was re-released in the UK as a double A-side with "Provider".)	BPI: Silver	In Search Of...
"Rock Star"	2002	—	—	—	32	—	—	74	—	—	15		In Search Of...
"Provider"	2002	—	—	—	—	—	—	95	43	—	20		In Search Of...
"She Wants to Move"	2004	—	69	6	21	19	7	8	58	36	5	BPI: Silver	Fly or Die
"Maybe"	2004	—	—	19	48	58	45	37	—	—	25		Fly or Die
"Everyone Nose (All the Girls Standing in the Line for the Bathroom)"	2008	—	—	—	69	65	—	—	—	—	41		Seeing Sounds
"Spaz"	2008	— (Note: "Spaz" peaked outside of the US Billboard Hot 100 chart, therefore it is listed on the Bubbling Under Hot 100 chart.)	—	—	—	—	—	—	—	—	—		Seeing Sounds
"Sooner or Later"	2009	—	—	—	—	—	—	—	—	—	—		Seeing Sounds
"Hot-n-Fun" (featuring Nelly Furtado)	2010	—	—	26	52	23	26	88	—	—	49		Nothing
"Hypnotize U"	2010	—	—	—	—	54	—	—	—	—	—		Nothing
"Lemon" (with Rihanna)	2017	36	16	37	44	63	—	87	— (Note: "Lemon" did not enter the Swedish Singellista Chart, but peaked at number one on the Swedish Heatseekers Chart.)	59	31	RIAA: 2× Platinum; ARIA: Platinum; BPI: Gold	No One Ever Really Dies
"1000" (with Future)	2017	—	—	—	—	—	—	—	—	—	—		No One Ever Really Dies
"Don't Don't Do It" (with Kendrick Lamar)	2018	—	—	—	—	—	—	—	—	—	—		No One Ever Really Dies
"Lemon (Remix)" (with Rihanna and Drake)	2018	—	—	—	—	—	—	—	—	—	—	RMNZ: Gold	Non-album single

=== Other appearances ===
Song title	Year	Album
"Loser" (featuring Clipse)	2003	The Neptunes Present...Clones
"Squeeze Me"	2015	Music from The SpongeBob Movie: Sponge Out of Water
"Patrick Star"	2015	Music from The SpongeBob Movie: Sponge Out of Water
"Sandy Squirrel"	2015	Music from The SpongeBob Movie: Sponge Out of Water
"Locked Away"	2015	—N/a

=== Music videos ===
Year	Title	Album
2001	"Lapdance" (with Lee Harvey and Vita)	In Search Of...
2002	"Rock Star"	In Search Of...
2002	"Provider"	In Search Of...
2004	"She Wants to Move"	Fly or Die
2004	"Maybe"	Fly or Die
2008	"Everyone Nose (All the Girls Standing in the Line for the Bathroom"	Seeing Sounds
2008	"Spaz"	Seeing Sounds
2009	"Sooner or Later"	Seeing Sounds
2010	"Hot-n-Fun" (with Nelly Furtado)	Nothing
2010	"Hypnotize U"	Nothing
2015	"Squeeze Me"	Music from The SpongeBob Movie: Sponge Out of Water
2017	"Lemon" (with Rihanna)	No One Ever Really Dies
2017	"1000" (with Future)	No One Ever Really Dies

== Bibliography ==
- Lethem, Jonathan; Bresnick, Paul (2002). Da Capo Best Music Writing 2002. Da Capo Press. ISBN 0306811669.
- "Sprite Fresh Sound Studio Live Performance with N.E.R.D." November 1, 2010 Buzznet Media
