= Provider (N.E.R.D. song) =

Single by N.E.R.D.

from the album In Search of...
- A-side: "Lapdance" (UK)
- Released: 2002
- Genre: Alternative rock; electro-funk
- Length: 4:24 (original); 4:18 (rock version)
- Label: Virgin
- Songwriters: Pharrell Williams; Chad Hugo
- Producer: The Neptunes

N.E.R.D. singles chronology
"Rock Star" (2002)	"Provider" (2002)	"She Wants to Move" (2004)

"Provider" is a song by American rock and hip-hop band N.E.R.D. from their debut studio album, In Search of....

The song was the third and final single from the album. It managed to gain minor popularity in Europe, making the charts in the Netherlands and Sweden. In the UK, it was released as a double a-side with a re-release of "Lapdance," peaking at number 20.

== Music video ==
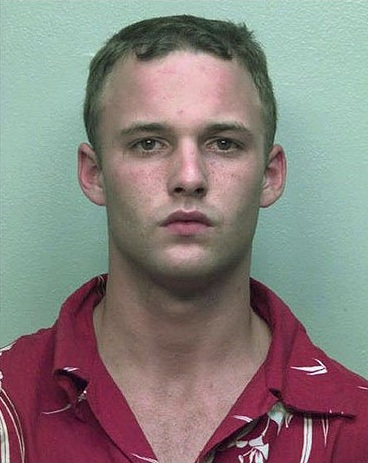
Actor Brad Renfro stars the music video.

The video opens with two girls and a guy in a truck, the guy asking the two if they remember a guy named Shagg. Pharrell and Chad ride around with a bike gang interspersed with scenes of a young man (Brad Renfro) struggling to make ends meet and his pregnant girlfriend (Kelli Garner). She suggests he apply to the military, which he angrily rejects but reluctantly does. The video ends with Pharrell wearing camo and holding a little girl displaying the peace sign with other children around him doing the same. Tony Hawk and Travis Barker make a cameo in a convenience store scene, while Pusha T of the Clipse appears as a drug dealer.

== Track listing ==
=== UK CD single ===
1. "Provider" (Zero 7 Remix Edit)
2. "Provider" (Remix Radio Edit)
3. "Lapdance" (Freeform Reform)
4. "Provider" (Video)

== Charts ==
Chart (2003)	Peak position
Netherlands (Single Top 100)	95
Sweden (Sverigetopplistan)	43
UK Hip Hop/R&B (OCC)	7
UK Singles (OCC)	20
