= Peaches N Cream (Snoop Dogg song) =

Single by Snoop Dogg featuring Charlie Wilson

from the album Bush
- Released: March 10, 2015
- Recorded: 2014
- Genre: West Coast hip hop; funk
- Length: 4:04
- Label: Columbia; I Am Other; Doggystyle
- Songwriters: Calvin Broadus; Cornell Haynes, Jr.; Garry Shider; George Clinton; Mary Brockert; Pharrell Williams; Robert Ginyard, Jr.; James Brown; Walter Morrison
- Producer: Pharrell Williams

Snoop Dogg singles chronology
"Dumb Shit" (2015)	"Peaches N Cream" (2015)	"So Many Pros" (2015)

Charlie Wilson singles chronology
"Touched By An Angel" (2014)	"Peaches N Cream" (2015)	"Fucking Young / Perfect" (2015)

"Peaches N Cream" is a song by American hip hop recording artist Snoop Dogg, featuring vocals from American singer Charlie Wilson. was released on March 10, 2015, as the first single of his thirteenth studio album Bush, with the record labels I Am Other and Columbia Records. The song was produced by Pharrell Williams, who also participated in the band composition, along with the interpreters and Nelly, Garry Shider, George Clinton, James Brown, Robert Ginyard, Jr., Mary Brockert, and Walter Morrison.

== Composition ==
"Peaches N Cream" is a hip hop, mid-tempo song that features beats and minor influences of funk. The song itself contains a sample of "It Takes Two" by Rob Base and DJ E-Z Rock from their album It Takes Two, "One Nation Under a Groove" by George Clinton group Funkadelic from their album One Nation Under a Groove and "I Need Your Lovin'" by Teena Marie from her album Irons in the Fire.

== Music video ==
On March 9, 2015, Snoop's uploaded the music video for "Peaches N Cream" on his YouTube and Vevo account. The lyric video directed by Wolf & Crow. The music video was released on March 18, 2015. The music video was directed by Aramis Israel and Hannah Lux Davis. Pharrell Williams makes his appearance in the video. The video is exactly four minutes and twenty seconds long, a reference to cannabis.

== Commercial performance ==
"Peaches N Cream" is his highest-charting single from Bush. The song debuted at number-one on the United States Billboard Twitter Top Tracks chart dated March 28, 2015 and debuted at number 16 Bubbling Under Hot 100 Singles. Internationally the song peaking at number three in Belgium (Wallonia). In the United Kingdom, the song debuted and peaked at number 58 on the UK Singles Chart. In the Australia "Peaches N Cream" debuted and peaked at number 93 on the ARIA Singles chart.

== Live performances ==
The song was the performed for the public for the first time in Los Angeles, on February 5, 2015, during a Pre-Grammy party. Kendrick Lamar, Warren G, Too $hort, Chaka Khan and Miguel were in attendance. Snoop Dogg performing his song during his guest starring performance in Fox's Empire episode "Die But Once". On March 29, 2015, Snoop performed it for the song along with Charlie Wilson during the iHeartRadio Music Awards 2015.

== Track listing ==
- Download digital
1. Peaches N Cream (featuring Charlie Wilson) — 4:44
- CD single (Sweden)
1. Peaches N Cream (Radio Edit) — 4:09

== Charts ==
=== Weekly charts ===
Chart (2015)	Peak position
Australia (ARIA)	93
Australia Urban (ARIA)	16
Belgium (Ultratop 50 Flanders)	14
Belgium Urban (Ultratop Flanders)	18
Belgium (Ultratop 50 Wallonia)	3
Belgium Airplay (Ultratop Wallonia)	41
France (SNEP)	57
Japan Hot 100 (Billboard)	28
Mexico Ingles Airplay (Billboard)	43
Netherlands (Dutch Single Tip)	13
Scotland Singles (OCC)	34
UK Singles (OCC)	58
UK Hip Hop/R&B (OCC)	12
US Bubbling Under Hot 100 (Billboard)	16
US Adult R&B Songs (Billboard)	30
US Hot R&B/Hip-Hop Songs (Billboard)	41
US Rhythmic Airplay (Billboard)	19

== Release history ==
Region	Date	Format	Label	Ref.
United States	March 10, 2015	Digital download	Doggystyle; Columbia	
United States	March 10, 2015	Hot AC radio	Doggystyle; Columbia	
United States	March 10, 2015	Urban radio	Doggystyle; Columbia	
Europe	March 12, 2015	Digital download	Doggystyle; Columbia	
United Kingdom	May 3, 2015	Digital download	Doggystyle; Columbia	
