= She Wants to Move =

2004 single by N*E*R*D

Single by N*E*R*D

from the album Fly or Die
- B-side: "Rock Star" (remix)
- Released: February 9, 2004
- Length: 3:34
- Label: Star Trak; Virgin
- Songwriters: Pharrell Williams; Chad Hugo
- Producer: The Neptunes

N*E*R*D singles chronology
"Provider" (2002)	"She Wants to Move" (2004)	"Maybe" (2004)

Music video
- "She Wants to Move" on YouTube

"She Wants to Move" is a single by American hip hop and rock group N*E*R*D from their second studio album, Fly or Die (2004). It was written by Pharrell Williams and Chad Hugo and released on February 9, 2004, as the album's lead single. The song peaked at number six on the US Billboard Hot Dance Club Play chart and peaked within the top 10 on the charts of Denmark, the Netherlands, Norway, and the United Kingdom. It received substantial airplay on MTV.

In Australia the song was ranked number 63 on Triple J's Hottest 100 of 2004. The video for the song features British singer, rapper and television personality Alesha Dixon. This song was featured in a party scene in the movie Coach Carter, as well as in an episode of Six Feet Under, "The Black Forest."

== Track listings ==
US DVD single

1. "She Wants to Move" (music video) – 3:30
2. "She Wants to Move" (Native Tongue remix featuring Common, Mos Def, De La Soul and Q-Tip) – 4:44
3. "She Wants to Move" (Beenie Man feat. Ms. Thing vs. N*E*R*D) – 4:46
4. "She Wants to Move" (Basement Jaxx dub) – 4:14

Canadian and European CD single; UK CD1

1. "She Wants to Move" (album version) – 3:33
2. "Rock Star" (Jason Nevins remix edit) – 3:48

UK CD2

1. "She Wants to Move" (album version) – 3:33
2. "She Wants to Move" (DFA remix) – 7:38
3. "She Wants to Move" (Mac & Toolz remix) – 3:49
4. "She Wants to Move" (video) – 3:30

Australian CD single

1. "She Wants to Move" (album version) – 3:33
2. "She Wants to Move" (DFA remix) – 7:38
3. "Rock Star" (Jason Nevins remix edit) – 3:48

== Charts ==
=== Weekly charts ===
Chart (2004)	Peak position
Australia (ARIA)	21
Australian Club Chart (ARIA)	2
Australian Urban (ARIA)	6
Belgium (Ultratop 50 Flanders)	19
Belgium (Ultratop 50 Wallonia)	28
Denmark (Tracklisten)	5
Europe (Eurochart Hot 100)	16
Germany (GfK)	51
Ireland (IRMA)	11
Italy (FIMI)	12
Netherlands (Dutch Top 40)	10
Netherlands (Single Top 100)	8
New Zealand (Recorded Music NZ)	11
Norway (VG-lista)	7
Scotland Singles (OCC)	5
Sweden (Sverigetopplistan)	58
Switzerland (Schweizer Hitparade)	36
UK Singles (OCC)	5
UK Hip Hop/R&B (OCC)	2
US Dance Club Play (Billboard) Basement Jaxx & Jason Nevins mixes	6
US Dance Singles Sales (Billboard) Jason Nevins remix	6
US Hot R&B/Hip-Hop Singles & Tracks (Billboard)	69

=== Year-end charts ===
Chart (2004)	Position
Australia (ARIA)	94
Australian Club Chart (ARIA)	23
Belgium (Ultratop 50 Flanders)	77
Italy (FIMI)	37
Netherlands (Dutch Top 40)	59
Netherlands (Single Top 100)	56
UK Singles (OCC)	52

== Certifications ==
Region	Certification	Certified units/sales
Australia (ARIA)	Gold	35,000^{^}
United Kingdom (BPI)	Silver	200,000^{‡}
^{^} Shipments figures based on certification alone.^{‡} Sales+streaming figures based on certification alone.

== Release history ==
Region	Date	Format(s)	Label(s)	Ref.
United States	February 9, 2004	Rhythmic contemporary; alternative radio	Virgin	
United States	March 1, 2004	Contemporary hit radio	Virgin	
Australia	March 8, 2004	CD	Virgin	
United Kingdom	March 15, 2004	12-inch vinyl; CD	Virgin	
