= Awake (Snoop Dogg song) =

Song by Snoop Dogg

from the album Bush
- Genre: West coast hip hop; disco-funk
- Length: 4:31
- Label: Doggystyle; i am OTHER; Columbia
- Songwriters: Calvin Broadus; Pharrell Williams
- Producer: The Neptunes

"Awake" is a song by American rapper Snoop Dogg, taken from his thirteenth album, Bush (2015). The song, produced by Pharrell Williams and Chad Hugo. The song contains additional vocals performed by Pharrell.

== Background ==
On August 28, 2014 was released a video of what would be a preview of one of the songs work together between Snoop and Pharrell. In the video are together Snoop, Kurupt and Daz Dillinger in the background plays a verse of the song.
