= Nothing (N.E.R.D. album) =

Studio album by N.E.R.D.
- Released: November 2, 2010
- Genres: Blues; pop; soft rock
- Length: 36:51
- Labels: Star Trak; Interscope
- Producers: The Neptunes; Daft Punk; Jimmy Iovine

N.E.R.D. chronology
Seeing Sounds (2008)	Nothing (2010)	No One Ever Really Dies (2017)

Singles from Nothing
- 1. "Hot-n-Fun" Released: May 18, 2010; 2. "Hypnotize U" Released: October 27, 2010

Nothing is the fourth studio album by American rock band N.E.R.D., released on November 2, 2010 on Star Trak Entertainment and Interscope Records in the United States. On October 17, 2010, the standard edition and the deluxe edition of the album became available for pre-order on iTunes.

== Concept ==
During production of the album, group member Pharrell Williams noted that "[w]e needed to align ourselves and make ourselves parallel and congruent with what society is feeling." Part of this feeling included uneasiness about the American political climate at that time. "There's a lot going on and a lot of things people don't necessarily understand. We have a Tea Party. We have conservative Democrats. We have liberals that are like neo-liberals and nothing like you thought they'd be. There's so many different hybrid sects of people and issues..."

In light of these ephemeral issues, timelessness is a key theme of the album. "So we thought why not make a timeless album that's kind of a time capsule, so 10 years from now people look at that album and go, 'I remember that era. That's when the 'Nothing' album came out.' I just wanted to make some good music that would affect people in a good way." Williams says it wasn't easy. N*E*R*D worked on "a previous body of work which was really good, but it wasn't timeless to me. I didn't feel like we were pushing ourselves as much as we could. We needed to perfect the sound, so we kept pushing the date back until it was right." The result includes "a lot of vintage sounds...The album is very '68-'72, '73, America meets Crosby, Stills & Nash meets Moody Blues."

== Recording ==
The impetus was partially based on more wholeheartedly embracing digital audio workstation programs such as Logic Studio Pro, while using new tools to invoke a spirit of emotionally responsive late-'60s/early-'70s psychedelic pop with the final product.

Hugo had previously adopted many in-the-box techniques, and Williams always had a backpack to tote around various fashionable gadgetry, so adding in a Macbook Pro and portable MIDI controllers was no stretch. Certainly, not having a dozen pieces of outboard gear to have to relocate or rent (not to mention rewire) was a relief to Coleman and second engineer Mike Larson, who split N*E*R*D sessions between such facilities as South Beach Studios, Midnight Blue Studios in Miami, and The Neptunes' own Hovercraft Studios in Virginia Beach (Hugo's home base for mixing elements into the base).

With ideas no longer waiting to be actualized with bodies sitting in front of the Korgs and beats synced to the Pro Tools clock, the composing of Nothing involved entire rhythm and chord progressions plus sequenced instrumentation ideas (courtesy of EXS24 virtual sampler libraries) being brought to Coleman's Pro Tools HD rig to form the bed of tracks. Monitoring with the Apogee Ensemble, the team would bounce the tracks down and import them, at which time Coleman would begin to apply signature tweaks to get a characteristic snap and thump.

The Access Virus TI still has a noticeable presence on Nothing, and live overdubs are blended into the programmed environment to reinforce it. Most often these guitar and bass licks come from Hugo, and sometimes Coleman, run into the Pro Tools DI, and then are processed through Line 6 Amp Farm and Tech21 SansAmp.

In short, Williams often lays down the initial patterns he has been playing out in his head (including everything from clavinet to handclaps), Hugo replays keys and adds tones such as "angry saxophone noise" (his description), and then Williams and Haley track lead vocals, harmonies, beatbox, and other percussive sounds. When needed, different drums are auditioned and triggered from disk, but there was no recording of additional live kits during the 2010 sessions. Finally, tone sculpting commences. "It's a different process [to be more virtual], and it does make some things easier," says Hugo. "There are also songs on the album that are more straightforward in rhythm, more four-on-the-floor, so there wasn't as much time in drum editing."

This time around, songwriting duties were shared between both Pharrell Williams and Chad Hugo, unlike their last effort Seeing Sounds where Williams had the majority of songwriting credits, with the exception of "Hot N' Fun", "Hypnotize U" (co written between Pharrell and Daft Punk) and "I Wanna Jam". (Co-written between Pharrell and Shae).

== Singles ==
- "Hot-n-Fun" is the album's lead single released on May 18, 2010. It became a top 30 hit in Italy, Belgium, on the U.S. Hot Dance Club Songs chart and the UK R&B Chart.
- "Hypnotize U" is the official second single released from the album. It was produced by Daft Punk and became available for download on iTunes on October 27.

Along with these singles, N*E*R*D has also released a few viral videos for 2 additional singles, one for "Help Me" and also for "Life as a Fish" which can be seen on the BBC Ice Cream website.

== Reception ==
=== Commercial performance ===
The album debuted at number twenty one on the US Billboard 200 chart, with first-week sales of 20,000 copies.

=== Critical response ===
Professional ratings
Review scores
Source	Rating
Allmusic	3/5 stars
The A.V. Club	C
Entertainment Weekly	B+
Los Angeles Times	2.5/4 stars
musicOMH	3/5 stars
NME	(6/10)
The Observer	(favorable)
Pitchfork Media	(4.1/10)
PopMatters	(7/10)
Sputnikmusic	1.5/5 stars

Nothing received mixed to positive reviews from most music critics. At Metacritic, which assigns a normalized rating out of 100 to reviews from mainstream critics, the album received an average score of 62, based on 19 reviews, which indicates "generally favorable reviews". Rave Magazine said, "Pharrell Williams should either stop letting his wang co-write his songs or start giving it a credit in the liner notes" and gave it two and a half stars out of five.

== Legacy ==
In 2024, the track "God Bless Us All" appeared on Williams' soundtrack album Piece by Piece (Original Motion Picture Soundtrack).

== Track listing ==
No.	Title	Writer(s)	Producer(s)	Length
1.	"Party People" (featuring T.I.)	Pharrell Williams; Chad Hugo; Clifford Harris, Jr.	The Neptunes	3:52
2.	"Hypnotize U"	Williams; Thomas Bangalter; Guy-Manuel de Homem-Christo	Daft Punk; The Neptunes (add.)	4:16
3.	"Help Me"	Williams; Hugo; Jimmy Iovine	The Neptunes	4:07
4.	"Victory"	Williams; Hugo	The Neptunes	3:42
5.	"Perfect Defect"	Williams; Hugo	The Neptunes	3:42
6.	"I've Seen the Light/Inside of Clouds"	Williams; Hugo	The Neptunes	4:25
7.	"God Bless Us All"	Williams; Hugo	The Neptunes	3:29
8.	"Life as a Fish"	Williams; Hugo	The Neptunes	2:36
9.	"Nothing on You"	Williams; Hugo	The Neptunes	3:18
10.	"Hot-n-Fun" (featuring Nelly Furtado)	Williams	The Neptunes	3:24

Deluxe edition

Bonus tracks
No.	Title	Writer(s)	Producer(s)	Length
11.	"It's in the Air"	Williams; Hugo	The Neptunes	4:21
12.	"Sacred Temple"	Williams; Hugo	The Neptunes	4:11
13.	"I Wanna Jam"	Williams, Shay Haley	The Neptunes	3:34
14.	"The Man"	Williams; Hugo	The Neptunes	3:18

Japan bonus tracks
No.	Title	Writer(s)	Producer(s)	Length
15.	"Hot-n-Fun" (Boys Noize Remix, featuring Nelly Furtado)	Williams	The Neptunes	5:55
16.	"Hot-n-Fun" (Starsmith Remix, featuring Nelly Furtado)	Williams	The Neptunes	5:34

iTunes bonus tracks
No.	Title	Writer(s)	Producer(s)	Length
15.	"Fuego"	Williams; Hugo	The Neptunes	3:39

Amazon bonus tracks
No.	Title	Writer(s)	Producer(s)	Length
15.	"Ride That Thang" (featuring Fam-Lay)	Williams; Hugo	The Neptunes	3:50

== Charts ==
Chart (2010)	Peak position
Australian Albums Chart	55
Belgian (Flanders) Albums Chart	56
Belgian (Flanders) Alternative Albums	14
Belgian (Flanders) Heatseekers	20
Belgian (Wallonia) Albums Chart	40
Belgian (Wallonia) Heatseekers	3
Canadian Albums Chart	56
Dutch Albums Chart	31
French Albums Chart	43
French Digital Albums Chart	4
Swiss Albums Chart	32
UK Albums Chart	83
UK R&B Albums Chart	8
US Billboard 200	21
US Billboard Top R&B/Hip-Hop Albums	5

== Personnel ==
Credits for Nothing adapted from Allmusic

- Yaneley Arty – management
- Tom Bailey – assistant
- Thomas Bangalter – arranger, composer, musician
- Jason Carder – trumpet
- Lori Castro – assistant
- Clifford Harris – composer
- Andrew Coleman – arranger, digital editing, engineer, guitar (acoustic)
- Daft Punk – producer
- Guy-Manuel de Homem-Christo – arranger, composer, musician
- Demacio "Demo" Castellon – engineer
- Rhea Dummett – vocals, vocals (background)
- Cliff Feiman – production supervisor
- Geoff Foster – engineer
- Brian Gardner – mastering
- Matty Green – assistant
- Hart Gunther – assistant
- Chad Hugo – composer, saxophone
- Jimmy Iovine – composer, executive producer
- Martin Kierszenbaum – A&R
- Adam Larson – art direction, design
- Mike Larson – arranger, digital editing, engineer
- Guillermo Lefeld – assistant
- Daniel Lerner – engineer
- PJ McGinnis – assistant
- Alan Meyerson – mixing
- The Neptunes – producer
- Satoshi Noguchi – assistant
- Terry Richardson – photography
- Mark "Spike" Stent – mixing
- Pharrell Williams – composer, executive producer

== Release history ==
Region	Release	Edition	Label
United Kingdom	October 29, 2010	Standard (CD); Deluxe (Digital download)	Polydor
United States	November 2, 2010	Standard (CD / digital download); Deluxe (CD / digital download)	Interscope
