= Hypnotize U =

Single by N.E.R.D.

from the album Nothing
- Released: October 16, 2010
- Recorded: 2009
- Genre: Funk rock; R&B; synth-pop; funk
- Length: 4:19
- Label: Interscope
- Songwriters: Pharrell Williams; Thomas Bangalter; Guy-Manuel de Homem-Christo
- Producer: Daft Punk

N.E.R.D. singles chronology
"Hot-n-Fun" (2010)	"Hypnotize U" (2010)	"Lemon" (2017)

Music video
- "N.E.R.D. - Hypnotize U" on YouTube

"Hypnotize U" is a song by American band N.E.R.D., released on October 16, 2010, as the second single off their fourth studio album, Nothing. It was produced by the French electronic music duo Daft Punk.

== Music video ==
A music video for "Hypnotize U" was filmed. It was released on November 2, 2010. It shows the group's frontman Pharrell Williams at a mansion with a group of attractive women, who act as though hypnotized by him.

== Track listing ==
Digital download

1. "Hypnotize U" – (4:19)
2. "Hypnotize U" (Nero remix) – (5:34)
3. "Hypnotize U" (Nico de Andrea remix) – (5:11)

CD album

1. "Hot-n-Fun" (featuring Nelly Furtado) – (3:22)
2. "Party People" (featuring T.I.) – (3:42)
3. "Hypnotize U" – (4:19)

iTunes download

1. "Hypnotize U" – (4:19)

Remixes

1. "Hypnotize U" (Dirty South Remix) – (5:40)
2. "Hypnotize U" (Nero remix) – (5:34)
3. "Hypnotize U" (Alex Metric remix) – (6:10)
4. "Hypnotize U" (Steve Duda remix) – (4:46)
5. "Hypnotize U" (Tong and Rodgers Wonderland Radio remix) – (4:20)

== Live performances ==
N.E.R.D. performed the song live at Brooklyn on July 13, 2010. They also performed the single at MP3 on June 15, 2010, as well as alongside Chris Brown at New York City. They also performed it on the Late Show with David Letterman.

== Charts ==
Chart (2010)	Peak position
Belgium (Ultratop 50 Flanders)	54
