= Spaz (song) =

Single by N.E.R.D.

from the album Seeing Sounds
- Released: 2008
- Genre: Rap rock
- Length: 3:51
- Label: Virgin
- Songwriter: Pharrell Williams
- Producer: The Neptunes

N.E.R.D. singles chronology
"Everyone Nose (All the Girls Standing in the Line for the Bathroom)" (2008)	"Spaz" (2008)	"Sooner or Later" (2009)

Music video
- "Spaz" on YouTube

"Spaz" is a song by American rock and hip-hop band N.E.R.D. released as the second single from their third studio album Seeing Sounds. The song peaked at number six on the U.S. Billboard Bubbling Under Hot 100 Singles chart upon release in 2008. The group performed the song at the 2008 BET Hip Hop Awards, and were joined on stage by fellow American rappers Lil Wayne, Busta Rhymes, T-Pain, Swizz Beatz and Common (who had performed "Universal Mind Control" with Pharrell before the song).

== Music video ==
The music video for the single, shot in black-and-white, features live footage of a Brixton Academy concert on June 14, 2008 and at Madison Square Garden during Kanye West's Glow in the Dark Tour. It was directed by Robert Hales.

== Legacy ==
The song was featured on NBA 2K9, NBA Live 09, Zune AD and the reveal trailer of Watch Dogs 2, which later became the official Radio in-game track. American alternative hip hop artist Kid Cudi sampled “Spaz” for his song “Cudi Spazzin’” from his 2008 mixtape A Kid Named Cudi.

== Track listing ==
=== Digital download ===
1. "Spaz"

== Charts ==
Chart (2008)	Peak position
US Bubbling Under Hot 100 Singles (Billboard)	6
US Digital Songs (Billboard)	61
