= Hot-n-Fun =

Single by N.E.R.D. featuring Nelly Furtado

from the album Nothing
- Released: May 18, 2010
- Genre: Pop; G-funk; funk
- Length: 3:23
- Label: Star Trak; Interscope
- Songwriter: Pharrell Williams
- Producer: The Neptunes

N.E.R.D. singles chronology
| "Sooner or Later" (2009) | "Hot-n-Fun" (2010) | "Hypnotize U" (2010) |

Nelly Furtado singles chronology
| "Bajo Otra Luz" (2010) | "Hot-n-Fun" (2010) | "Night Is Young" (2010) |

Music video
- "Hot-n-Fun" on YouTube

Professional ratings
Review scores
| Source | Rating |
|---|---|
| Rolling Stone | 2.5/5 stars |

"Hot-n-Fun" is a song by group N.E.R.D. featuring vocals from Canadian singer Nelly Furtado. It was released as the first single from their fourth studio album Nothing.

== Music videos ==
=== Official video ===
The music video for "Hot-n-Fun" was directed by Jonas Åkerlund. It was released June 17, 2010 on to their official website. The video features N.E.R.D. driving through the desert picking up female hitchhikers in their Kaws-painted Rolls-Royce Corniche convertible. Later they party with the hitchhikers around a bonfire. Nelly Furtado appears singing solely in separate scenes, first in the sky, second in the bonfire. N.E.R.D. paid homage to The Beatles' "Yellow Submarine" and the Magical Mystery Tour, calling it a psychedelic ride. The video incorporates styles from the late '60s and early '70s. As of April 2018, "Hot-n-Fun" has obtained over 13 million views on N.E.R.D.'s VEVO account on YouTube.

=== Alternative videos ===
In August 2010, three other alternative videos were released. The first, set to the original version of the song (featuring Furtado's vocals), the 2nd one set to the Boys Noize remix, and the third one set to the Starsmith remix (the last two without Furtado's vocals). These alternative videos do not feature Furtado's appearance and are mostly made up of tour footage and live performances. They premiered on N.E.R.D.'s official website and later appeared on N.E.R.D.'s VEVO channel on YouTube to promote the "Hot-n-Fun" remix EP.

== Track listing ==
Digital download

1. "Hot-n-Fun" (featuring Nelly Furtado) — 3:22

The Remixes EP

1. "Hot-n-Fun" (Starsmith Club Remix) — 5:33
2. "Hot-n-Fun" (Boys Noize Remix) — 5:55
3. "Hot-n-Fun" (Nero Remix) — 4:04
4. "Hot-n-Fun" (Wideboys Club Remix) — 6:00
5. "Hot-n-Fun" (Yeasayer Remix) — 3:42
6. "Hot-n-Fun" (Crookers Remix) — 5:05
7. "Hot-n-Fun" (Hot Chip Remix) — 6:01

== Charts ==
Chart performance for "Hot-n-Fun"
| Chart (2010) | Peak position |
|---|---|
| Australia (ARIA) | 52 |
| Belgium (Ultratop 50 Flanders) | 23 |
| Belgium (Ultratip Bubbling Under Wallonia) | 3 |
| Canada Hot 100 (Billboard) | 98 |
| Netherlands (Single Top 100) | 88 |
| UK Singles (OCC) | 49 |
| UK Hip Hop/R&B (OCC) | 15 |
| US Dance Club Songs (Billboard) | 26 |
