= Fly or Die =

Studio album by N.E.R.D.
- Released: March 23, 2004
- Recorded: 2003
- Genre: Art rock; progressive pop
- Length: 61:01
- Label: Star Trak; Virgin; EMI
- Producer: The Neptunes

N.E.R.D. chronology
In Search of... (2001)	Fly or Die (2004)	Seeing Sounds (2008)

Singles from Fly or Die
- 1. "She Wants to Move" Released: March 9, 2004; 2. "Maybe" Released: June 14, 2004

Fly or Die is the second studio album by American rap rock band N.E.R.D. It was released on March 23, 2004.

== Production ==
The band recorded its second album Fly or Die during 2003. The band actually learned the instruments needed to play the tunes, so they could perform live. As Chad Hugo told MTV News on December 8, 2003, "We're the ones playing the instruments live this time. I just started playing guitar last year so I'm learning as we go. Pharrell's playing drums. Last time, (on In Search of...) we didn't have time to learn certain instruments so we got Spymob to help us out."

The band also recruited some assistance to record the album with Lenny Kravitz and Questlove playing on the track "Maybe." Several of tracks concern issues of particular concern to adolescents including "Thrasher" about bullies, "Drill Sergeant" about rebellion and conscription, and first love on "Backseat Love". Considered an eclectic album of art rock, Fly or Die features songs that have been compared to XTC and 10cc.

== Reception ==
Professional ratings
Aggregate scores
Source	Rating
Metacritic	68/100
Review scores
Source	Rating
AllMusic	3.5/5 stars
Entertainment Weekly	A−
The Guardian	3/5 stars
NME	8/10
Pitchfork	3.1/10
PopMatters	8/10
Rolling Stone	3/5 stars
Slant	3/5 stars
The Times	4/5 stars
Uncut	5/5 stars

Fly or Die went on sale on March 23, 2004. The lead single "She Wants to Move" went into the Top 5 in U.K, top 10 in New Zealand, top 20 in Norway, Italy, Ireland and Denmark and top 40 in Australia and the Netherlands as of March 2004. Fly or Die sold 412,000 copies in the United States, but shipped at least 500,000 units making it qualify for RIAA's Gold Certification.

Rolling Stone (4/15/04, p. 147) - 3 stars out of 5 - "It's fascinating to hear these rap geniuses go undercover as a bar band you might hear rocking Journey covers in a bowling alley."

Entertainment Weekly (4/2/04, p. 62) - "Fly or Die is craftier and more multilayered than its predecessor....[A] set of clever, complex, studio-crafted pop--complete with musicianly, smooth-jazz licks--that doesn't owe allegiance to any one genre." - Rating: A-

Uncut (p. 91) - 5 stars out of 5 - "N*E*R*D can replicate machine hypersyncopation at the drop of a hi-hat. Prog-pop album of year."

Uncut (p. 74) - Ranked #18 in Uncut's "Best Albums of 2004" - "[A]n object lesson in eclectic art-rock....[T]his prog-pop classic reveal further depths of detail with every repeated play." They also described it as "the black White Music".

Mojo (p. 106) - 4 stars out of 5 - "This is an enthusiastic hymn to the terminally uncool, an un-ironic celebration of nerd-culture....They make a party you want to be invited to."

It was included in the book 1001 Albums You Must Hear Before You Die.

== Track listing ==
All tracks are written by Pharrell Williams and Chad Hugo; produced by The Neptunes.

No.	Title	Length
1.	"Don't Worry About It"	3:41
2.	"Fly or Die"	3:30
3.	"Jump" (featuring Joel Madden and Benji Madden)	3:55
4.	"Backseat Love"	2:48
5.	"She Wants to Move"	3:33
6.	"Breakout"	3:47
7.	"Wonderful Place" / "Waiting for You"	7:09
8.	"Drill Sergeant" / "Preservation"	6:54
9.	"Thrasher"	2:51
10.	"Maybe"	4:22
11.	"The Way She Dances"	4:05
12.	"Chariot of Fire" / "Find My Way"	8:15

== Charts ==
=== Weekly charts ===
Chart (2004)	Peak position
Australian Albums (ARIA)	11
Australian Urban Albums (ARIA)	1
Austrian Albums (Ö3 Austria)	33
Belgian Albums (Ultratop Flanders)	9
Belgian Albums (Ultratop Wallonia)	33
Canadian Albums (Nielsen SoundScan)	12
Canadian R&B Albums (Nielsen SoundScan)	3
Danish Albums (Hitlisten)	9
Dutch Albums (Album Top 100)	5
Finnish Albums (Suomen virallinen lista)	19
French Albums (SNEP)	19
German Albums (Offizielle Top 100)	20
Irish Albums (IRMA)	12
Italian Albums (FIMI)	10
New Zealand Albums (RMNZ)	22
Norwegian Albums (VG-lista)	4
Portuguese Albums (AFP)	30
Scottish Albums (OCC)	3
Swedish Albums (Sverigetopplistan)	9
Swiss Albums (Schweizer Hitparade)	27
UK Albums (OCC)	4
UK R&B Albums (OCC)	2
US Billboard 200	6
US Top R&B/Hip-Hop Albums (Billboard)	5

=== Year-end charts ===
Chart (2004)	Position
Australian Albums (ARIA)	93
Belgian Albums (Ultratop Flanders)	65
Dutch Albums (Album Top 100)	28
UK Albums (OCC)	78
US Top R&B/Hip-Hop Albums (Billboard)	92

== Certifications ==
Region	Certification	Certified units/sales
Australia (ARIA)	Gold	35,000^{^}
Ireland (IRMA)	Gold	7,500^{^}
Netherlands (NVPI)	Gold	40,000^{^}
United Kingdom (BPI)	Gold	100,000^{^}
United States (RIAA)	Gold	500,000^{^}
^{^} Shipments figures based on certification alone.
