= In Search of... (N.E.R.D. album) =

2001 studio album

- Cover art featuring Shay Haley gaming on a PlayStation

Studio album by N.E.R.D.
- Released: August 6, 2001
- Recorded: 1999–2001
- Genre: Funk rock; rap rock
- Length: 61:34
- Label: Star Trak; Virgin
- Producer: The Neptunes

N.E.R.D. chronology
In Search of... (2001)	In Search of... (2002)

Singles from In Search Of...
- 1. "Lapdance" Released: May 21, 2001; 2. "Rock Star" Released: July 29, 2002; 3. "Provider" Released: 2002

Professional ratings
First version
Aggregate scores
Source	Rating
Metacritic	92/100
Review scores
Source	Rating
AllMusic	4/5 stars
The Guardian	4/5 stars
Hot Press	6/12
NME	8/10
Q	4/5 stars
Rolling Stone	4/5 stars
Slant Magazine	4/5 stars
Spin	8/10
Uncut	5/5 stars

In Search of... is the debut studio album by American funk rock band N.E.R.D. The group originally released the album on August 6, 2001 in Europe, where Kelis' Wanderland—produced by The Neptunes, consisting of N.E.R.D. members Pharrell Williams and Chad Hugo—was better received. Similarly to Kelis' early work, the original version of In Search of... juxtaposes hip hop and rock influences and styles. The album is named after the TV series In Search of..., hosted by Leonard Nimoy.

On March 12, 2002, In Search of... was re-released worldwide, with the largely electronic production backing of the album replaced by live backing provided by 1960s-style power pop band Spymob, giving the new version of the album a more rock-oriented sound. The skits and the intro from the original album were also dropped, significantly shortening the play length.

== First release ==
The 2001 version of In Search of..., also known as the "electronic version", features prominent digital-based production, including drum machines and synthesizers, as the backing tracks, with a sound more typical of Pharrell Williams and Chad Hugo's production work as The Neptunes.

The album features three skits book-ended to the tracks "Things Are Getting Better", "Stay Together" and "Tape You" telling the loose story of N.E.R.D. member Shay Haley (who is featured on the cover) meeting two female high-school groupies in a locker room, ludicrously calling in an escort, and taping them during sexual acts.

After the ending of "Bobby James", an unnamed 1:37 instrumental track starts with a child-like voice saying something unintelligible before being joined by a warp sound followed by a repetition of drums and futuristic sounds. Pharrell can be heard in the background doing ad libs as the drums pick up. A saxophone joins the melody three quarters of the way through and then dominates toward the end (with Pharrell taking a brief pause while the saxophone takes center stage before he picks back up a few seconds later). At the outro, Pharrell ad libs one last time as the drums end, the futuristic wails wind down and the saxophone plays a few extra notes before fading out.

=== Track listing ===
All tracks are written by Pharrell Williams and Chad Hugo.

No.	Title	Length
1.	"Lapdance" (featuring Lee Harvey and Vita)	3:33
2.	"Intro"	1:13
3.	"Things Are Getting Better"	4:55
4.	"Brain"	3:42
5.	"Provider"	4:24
6.	"Truth or Dare" (featuring Kelis and Terrar)	4:51
7.	"Run to the Sun"	4:45
8.	"Stay Together"	6:52
9.	"Baby Doll"	3:44
10.	"Tape You"	7:41
11.	"Am I High" (featuring Malice)	5:00
12.	"Rock Star - Poser"	4:29
13.	"Bobby James"	6:23
Total length:		61:34

== Re-release ==
In Search of...

Studio album by N.E.R.D.
- Released: March 12, 2002
- Genre: Rap rock; funk rock
- Length: 53:55
- Producer: The Neptunes

N.E.R.D. chronology
In Search of... (2001)	In Search of... (2002)	Fly or Die (2004)

Professional ratings
Second version
Aggregate scores
Source	Rating
Metacritic	83/100
Review scores
Source	Rating
AllMusic	4/5 stars
Blender	4/5 stars
Christgau's Consumer Guide	A−
Entertainment Weekly	A−
Los Angeles Times	3.5/4 stars
NME	8/10
Pitchfork	6.0/10
Q	4/5 stars
Rolling Stone	4/5 stars
Spin	8/10

For its 2002 worldwide release, N.E.R.D. withdrew the original European version of In Search of... and in its place issued a re-recorded version of the album, also known as the "rock version", with the electronic backings of the original version being replaced by a more rock-oriented sound with the use of live drums and guitars played by American funk rock band Spymob. After the making of this version, Chad Hugo learned to play the guitar and the band have since kept to this style, now mostly playing their own instruments. Explaining the creation of the new version, Pharrell Williams has stated that as N.E.R.D. was to be an entirely different venture to his and Hugo's work with the Neptunes, the band's music should also sound different, hence the decision to re-record the album.

The 2002 version cuts the intro and three skits found on the original album and features a slightly re-arranged track listing. The change of tactics in the re-release also allowed the group to tour and play live as N.E.R.D. more easily. It was released as an enhanced CD with extra CD-ROM material as well.

=== Track listing ===
No.	Title	Length
1.	"Lapdance" (featuring Lee Harvey and Vita)	3:29
2.	"Things Are Getting Better"	4:15
3.	"Brain"	3:43
4.	"Provider"	4:18
5.	"Truth or Dare" (featuring Kelis and Pusha T)	4:22
6.	"Tape You"	4:51
7.	"Run to the Sun"	4:51
8.	"Baby Doll"	3:43
9.	"Am I High" (featuring Malice)	4:48
10.	"Rock Star"	4:19
11.	"Bobby James"	6:11
12.	"Stay Together"	5:01
Total length:		53:55

== DVD-A release ==
In 2005, In Search of... was released as a 5.1 surround sound DVD-Audio edition. This version is based on the 2002 release, featuring slightly different mastering.

== Legacy ==
In Search Of... served as a sonic and aesthetic touchstone for many artists who came to prominence after its release. The late designer Virgil Abloh said the album "described a whole generation of young black kids and artists who have since been determined to be themselves and jump through that door that was opened by Pharrell." Tyler, the Creator said the album's singles served as his introduction to N.E.R.D. and made him a lifelong fan of The Neptunes. In 2018, Vulture magazine wrote, "It's difficult to see today's most influential acts as uninfluenced by the very elements of N.E.R.D.'s music that confounded audiences in the past."

== Charts ==
=== Weekly charts ===
Chart (2002–2003)	Peak position
Australian Albums (ARIA)	70
Australian Urban Albums (ARIA)	7
Dutch Albums (Album Top 100)	34
Scottish Albums (OCC)	36
Swedish Albums (Sverigetopplistan)	57
UK Albums (OCC)	28
UK R&B Albums (OCC)	2
US Billboard 200	56
US Top R&B/Hip-Hop Albums (Billboard)	31

=== Year-end charts ===
Chart (2002)	Position
Canadian Alternative Albums (Nielsen SoundScan)	116
Canadian R&B Albums (Nielsen SoundScan)	67
Canadian Rap Albums (Nielsen SoundScan)	33
US Billboard 200	168
Chart (2003)	Position
UK Albums (OCC)	154

== Certifications ==
Region	Certification	Certified units/sales
Netherlands (NVPI)	Gold	40,000^{^}
United Kingdom (BPI)	Platinum	300,000^{*}
United States (RIAA)	Gold	500,000^{^}
^{*} Sales figures based on certification alone.^{^} Shipments figures based on certification alone.
