= Rock Star (N.E.R.D. song) =

Single by N.E.R.D.

from the album In Search of...
- Released: July 29, 2002
- Recorded: 2001
- Genre: Hardcore hip-hop; R&B; pop; rap rock; nu metal; hard rock
- Length: 4:29 (electronic version); 4:19 (rock version)
- Label: Virgin
- Songwriters: Pharrell Williams; Chad Hugo
- Producer: The Neptunes

N.E.R.D. singles chronology
"Lapdance" (2001)	"Rock Star" (2002)	"Provider" (2002)

Music video
- "Rock Star" on YouTube

"Rock Star" is a song by American rock and hip-hop band N.E.R.D. It was released as the second single from their debut studio album In Search of... (2001). The song, the second single off the album, performed better in the United Kingdom than their previous single "Lapdance", peaking at number 15. It also became the group's first single to chart in Australia.

The song acted as a "second first single" of sorts, as it followed the group's debut "Lapdance", but was the first single to be released from the second, more streamlined version of In Search Of... rerecorded courtesy of Spymob rather than the Neptunes' trademark synths and electronic drum programming.

== Music video ==
The video features the members of N.E.R.D. as high school students in gym class with their militant gym teacher, played by actor Randy Quaid. N.E.R.D. later starts performing "Rock Star" as the gym teacher and the other students dance along to the song. A Capuchin monkey then eventually runs into the gym, and starts havoc.

== Usage in other media ==
The song is featured in the films, like The Guard, Bringing Down the House, Blue Crush, and Piece by Piece.

The Jason Nevins remix of the song has been featured in numerous video games such as Burnout Dominator, Burnout Paradise, and Forza Motorsport 2 as well as movie trailers for Shanghai Knights, The Fast and the Furious: Tokyo Drift and the 2004 film Taxi, and was featured in an Apple iPod advert. The Jason Nevins Club Blaster Edit has appeared in SSX 3.

An edited version of it was also used as the theme song for NFL's 2002 game NFL Fever, with Pharrell Williams' vocal part replaced with the title game words. The song also appears in the music video game Band Hero.

The original version appears in the video games Mat Hoffman Pro BMX 2, SX Superstar, and True Crime: Streets of LA.

A portion of "Rock Star" also appears in an episode (season 3, episode 4: "Zoso") of the television series Californication, as well as an episode of Northern Irish comedy Pulling Moves.

It placed at number 46 in the Triple J Hottest 100, 2002 in Australia, which is the world's largest annual music poll.

In 2024, the song appeared on Williams' soundtrack album Piece by Piece (Original Motion Picture Soundtrack).

From 2009 to 2023, the song appeared as an option on Hollywood Rip Ride Rockit at Universal Studios Florida.

== Track listing ==
1. "Rock Star" (Jason Nevins remix edit)
2. "Rock Star" (Formerly Rock Star Poser)
3. "Rock Star" (Nevin's Classic Club Blaster – edited mix)
4. "Rock Star" (video)

== Charts ==
Chart (2002)	Peak position
Australia (ARIA)	32
Australian Urban (ARIA)	10
Netherlands (Single Top 100)	74
Scotland Singles (OCC)	19
UK Hip Hop/R&B (OCC)	6
UK Singles (OCC)	15
US Alternative Airplay (Billboard)	36
