= Lapdance (song) =

Single by N.E.R.D. featuring Lee Harvey and Vita

from the album In Search of... and Kiss of the Dragon (soundtrack)
- Released: May 21, 2001
- Recorded: 2000
- Genre: Rap rock; nu metal; hard rock
- Length: 3:33 (electronic version); 3:29 (rock version)
- Label: Virgin
- Songwriters: Pharrell Williams; Charles Hugo; Gene Thornton
- Producer: The Neptunes

N.E.R.D. singles chronology
"Lapdance" (2001)	"Rock Star" (2002)

Music video
- "Lapdance" on YouTube

"Lapdance" is a song by American rock and hip-hop band N.E.R.D. from their debut studio album, In Search of... The song features rappers Lee Harvey and Vita, and was produced by the Neptunes.

It was ranked number 93 on VH1's "100 Greatest Songs of Hip Hop".

A remix of "Lapdance" by Trent Reznor appeared on the compilation album Spin This. Although it is censored, an uncensored version of the remix is available on a rare promo single disc. A remix of "Lapdance" by Paul Oakenfold appeared on the soundtrack album Swordfish. In 2020, the UK band Wargasm released a cover of the single. The song was used in the 2003 film Daredevil during the introduction scene of Kingpin (played by Micheal Clarke Duncan), who serves the story as the main antagonist.

== Charts ==
Chart (2001–2002)	Peak position
Netherlands (Single Top 100)	56
Scotland Singles (OCC)	43
UK Hip Hop/R&B (OCC)	15
UK Singles (OCC)	33
US Hot R&B/Hip-Hop Songs (Billboard)	85
US Hot Rap Songs (Billboard)	29
Chart (2007)	Peak position
Sweden (Sverigetopplistan)	47

== Certifications ==
Region	Certification	Certified units/sales
United Kingdom (BPI)	Silver	200,000^{‡}
^{‡} Sales+streaming figures based on certification alone.
