= Spymob =

American rock band from Minnesota

- Origin: Minneapolis, Minnesota, United States
- Genres: Alternative rock, funk rock, funk metal
- Years active: 1993–
- Labels: Star Trak, Arista Records, Ruthless Records, Epic Records
- Spinoffs: The Hopefuls
- Members: John Ostby; Eric Fawcett; Brent Paschke; Christian Twigg

Spymob is an American alternative rock band from Minneapolis, Minnesota. Best known for their appearance on the 2003 Star Trak Entertainment compilation The Neptunes present Clones, with the song "Half Steering...", they also provided backing instruments for N.E.R.D.'s 2002 debut In Search Of.... Their major label debut, Sitting Around Keeping Score, was the first rock album to be released on The Neptunes' Star Trak label. In 2014, the band released their next album, Memphis independently. Additionally, all four members have provided session work and touring support for other artists including N.E.R.D, Paramore, Snoop Dogg, Kelis, and Mike Doughty.

== History ==
Singer/keyboardist John Ostby, bassist Christian Twigg, guitarist Brent Paschke, and drummer Eric Fawcett formed in Minneapolis in the early 90s as "Reno." Playing staples such as 2040 and Kissing the Neighborhood Houses Goodbye in local venues such as the 400 Bar, the band recorded several demo songs (later released as Basement Tapes).

In 2001, the band was signed by The Neptunes' Star Trak label and hired to be the opening act and backing band for N.E.R.D. They were discovered by Pharrell Williams and Chad Hugo after they acquired an early demo tape of the bands and had become big fans.

Their work with N.E.R.D included re-recording the In Search of... album in order to provide it with a live instrumentation "rock sound" prior to its 2002 worldwide release.

Record label turmoil involving Star Trak, Arista Records, and L.A. Reid saw them eventually signing with Ruthless Records and releasing Sitting Around Keeping Score in 2004.

== Discography ==
Albums

- Townhouse Stereo (Vade Feels Music, 1996)
- On Pilot Mountain (2000)
- Basement Tapes (2001)
- Sitting Around Keeping Score (Ruthless Records/Epic Records, 2004)
- Memphis (2014)
- Another Night (2026)

Extended Plays

- Spymob EP (1999)

Promo Singles

- Walking Under Green Leaves (Star Trak, 2001)
- It Gets Me Going (Star Trak, 2003)
- Walking Under Green Leaves (Ruthless Records/Epic Records, 2004)

Collaborations

- Wanderland Kelis (Virgin), 2001
- In Search Of... N.E.R.D (Virgin), 2002
- Haughty Melodic Mike Doughty (ATO Records), 2005 (Eric Fawcett)
- Seeing Sounds N.E.R.D (Interscope Records), 2008 (Eric Fawcett, Brett Paschke)
