= Shay Haley =

American musician (born 1975)

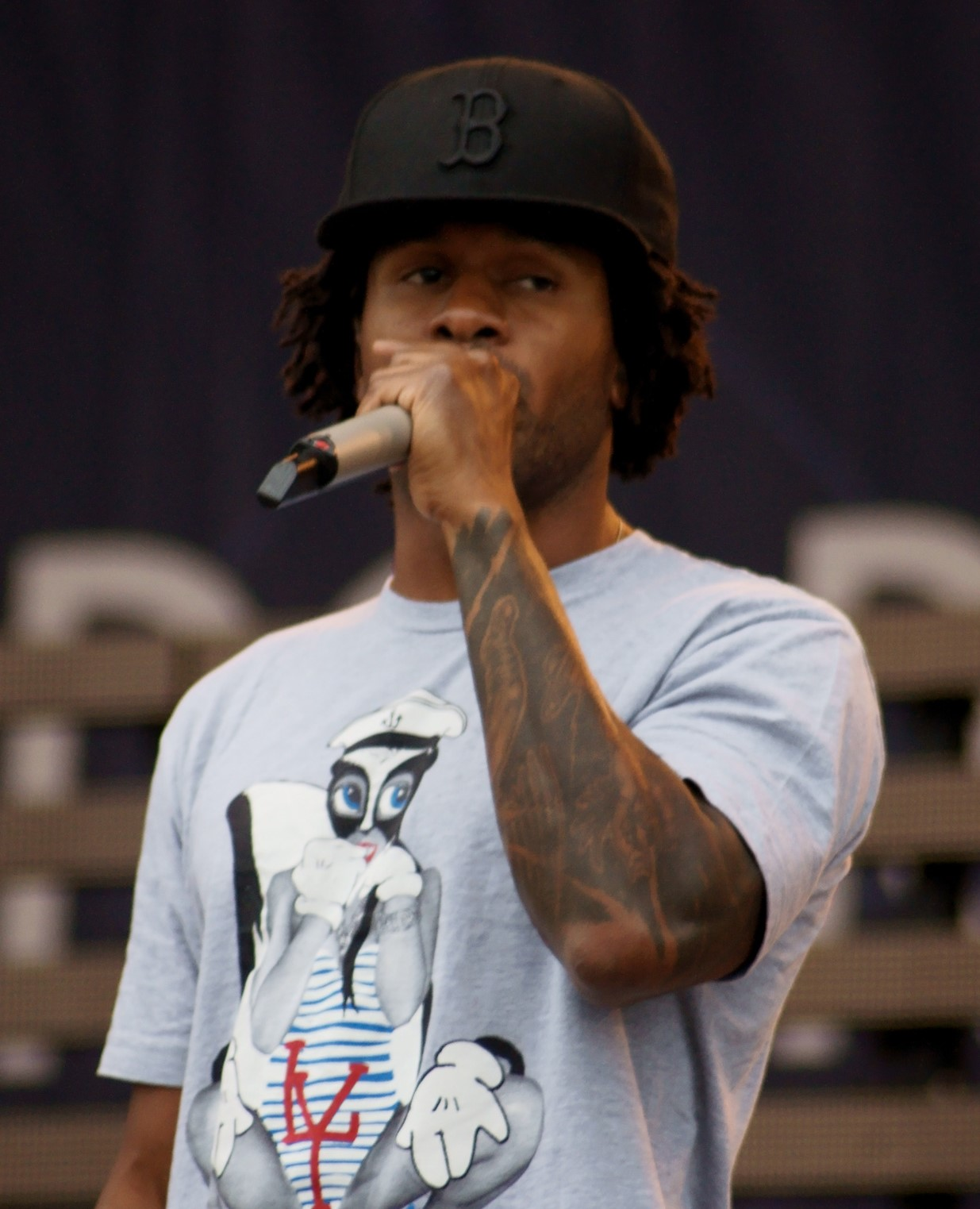
- Haley performing with N.E.R.D. at Pori Jazz in 2010

Background information
- Also known as: Shay; Shae; Shade
- Born: Sheldon Haley; December 18, 1975 (age 50); Portsmouth, Virginia, U.S.
- Genre: Hip-hop
- Occupation: Musician
- Instruments: Drums, vocals
- Years active: 1994–present
- Labels: Star Trak; Interscope; I Am Other; Columbia
- Formerly of: N.E.R.D.

Sheldon "Shay" Haley (born December 18, 1975), also known as Shade, is an American musician. He was a member of the rock and hip-hop band N.E.R.D., alongside Pharrell Williams and Chad Hugo. In a 2010 interview, Williams stated that Haley is "the root of the band" and "[Haley] keeps everyone grounded and together."

== Personal life ==
In November 2010, he married Jackie Garcia, the former girlfriend of murdered NFL safety Sean Taylor and niece of actor Andy García. They have four children together: Enzo, River, Giselle and Lilly. He also has a stepdaughter, Jackie, from Garcia's relationship with Taylor.
