= I Am Other =

American record label

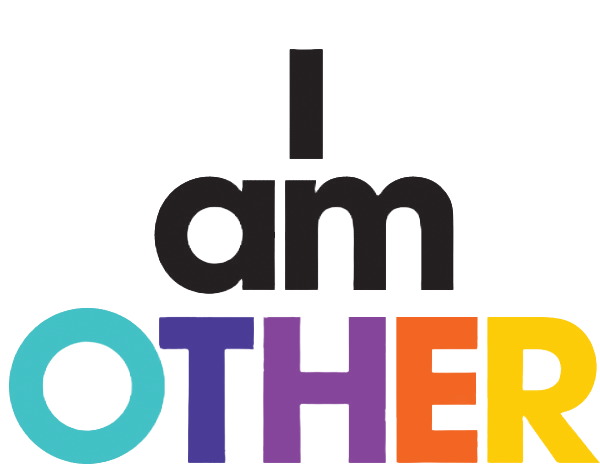
- Parent company: Sony Music Entertainment (SME)
- Founded: 2012; 14 years ago
- Founder: Pharrell Williams
- Distributors: Columbia Records (music label); YouTube (web)
- Country of origin: United States
- Location: New York, NY
- Official website: iamother.com

I Am Other is a multimedia creative collective, production company, and record label created by Pharrell Williams, that serves as an umbrella for all of his endeavors, including Billionaire Boys Club, ICECREAM apparel and textile company Bionic Yarn. There is also a dedicated YouTube channel launched by the artist, record producer and fashion designer in 2012. The channel was launched as part of YouTube's $100 million original channel initiative. The programming on the I Am Other channel focuses on music, culture, fashion and the arts. Williams describes the channel as a "cultural movement dedicated to Thinkers, Innovators and Outcasts." The channel launched with original series such as Awkward Black Girl by Issa Rae, StereoTypes.

== Historical programming ==
- Awkward Black Girl – A comedy web series written, produced and starring Issa Rae, who created the scripted comedy to test her theory that "we’re all awkward".
- Nardwuar – Music journalist Nardwuar hosts celebrity interviews with hip hop artists such as Drake, Jay-Z, Wiz Khalifa, Lil Wayne, Big Sean, ASAP Rocky, Snoop Dogg, and 2 Chainz.
- OTHERS by Hypebeast – The show is produced in New York City and Hong Kong, and features tastemakers in various fields including fashion, film, food, and technology in conjunction with the style site Hypebeast.
- Voice of Art – This documentary series from Nardwuar follows artists as they create awareness about social and political issues through their art. Features have included Migration is Beautiful with Favianna Rodriguez, and Graffiti Artists vs GMOs.
- Club Chrissie – Chrissie Miller and special guests teach viewers DIY design tips, including nail art, sneaker, jewelry and t-shirt customization.
- Stereotypes – Ryan Hall hosts this web series in which he conducts man-on-the-street interviews in New York City. He speaks to the public about social issues and popular culture including racial stereotypes, class, sexism, homophobia, politics, fashion, street style, and stop-and-frisk.
- Cloudy – This musical animated short by Nardwuar, Samuel Borkson and Arturo Sandoval III is an exploration into the clouds.
- FriendsWithYou - This is an art collaboration, part of Pharrell's i am OTHER brand.
- Piece by Piece – a 2024 American animated biographical documentary comedy film, which follows the life and career of Williams through the lens of Lego animation. Co-production with Focus Features, The Lego Group, and Tremolo Productions.
