= Clipse discography =

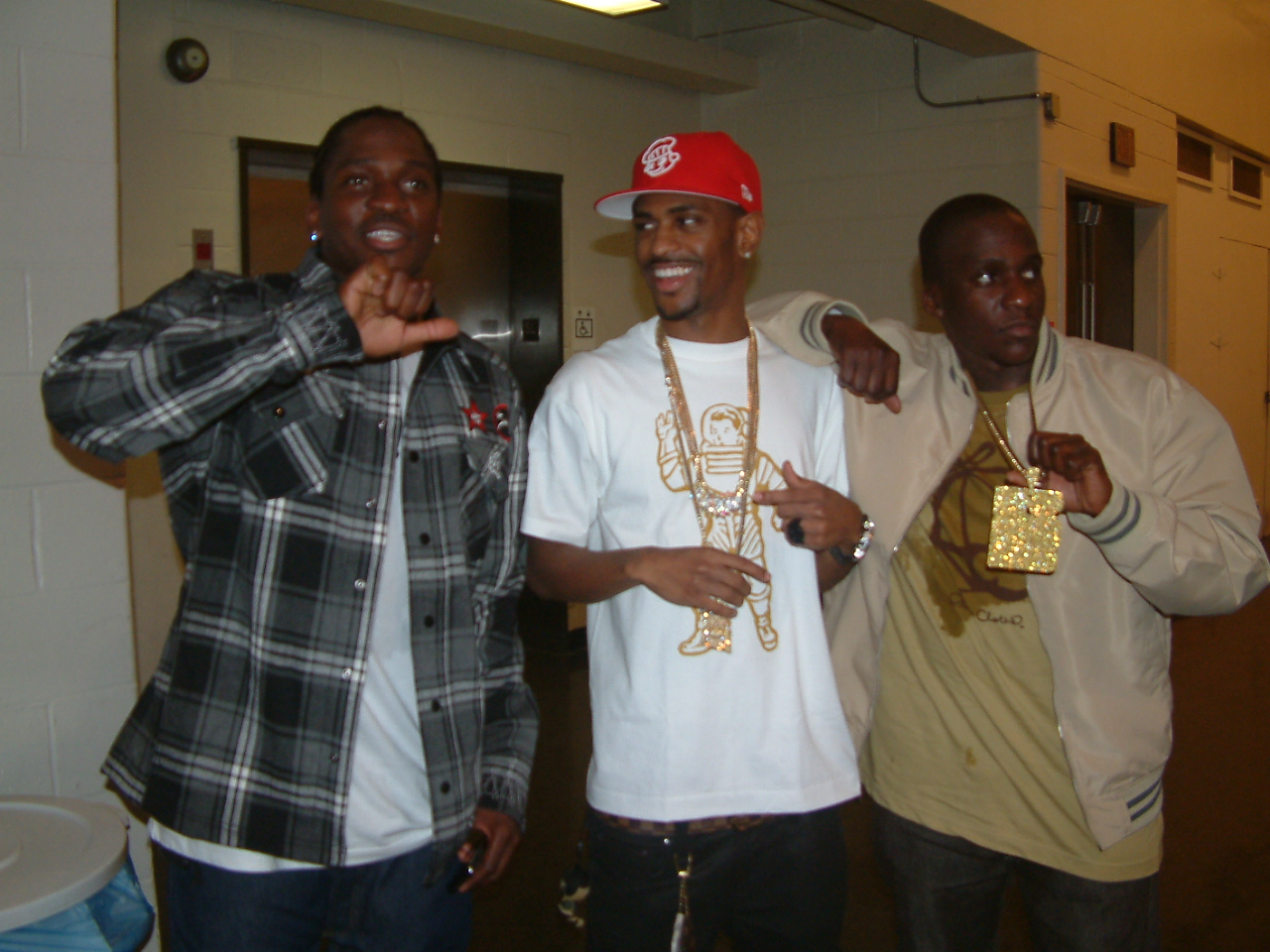
- Clipse: Pusha T (left) and Malice (right) with fellow rapper Big Sean in November 2008
- Studio albums: 4
- Singles: 16
- Music videos: 12
- Mixtapes: 5

This is the discography of Clipse, an American hip-hop duo consisting of rappers Pusha T and Malice.

== Albums ==
=== Studio albums ===
List of studio albums, with selected chart positions, sales figures and certifications
| Title | Album details | Peak chart positions | | | | | | | | | | Sales | Certifications |
| Title | Album details | US | US R&B | US Rap | AUS | CAN | NLD | NZ | SWI | UK | UK R&B | Sales | Certifications |
|---|---|---|---|---|---|---|---|---|---|---|---|---|---|
| Lord Willin' | Released: August 20, 2002 (US); Labels: Star Trak, Arista; Formats: Cassette, CD, digital download, LP | 4 | 1 | — | — | — | — | — | — | 194 | 37 | US: 959,000 (Note: Sales as of November 30, 2009.) | RIAA: Gold |
| Hell Hath No Fury | Released: November 28, 2006 (US); Labels: Star Trak, Re-Up, Jive; Formats: CD, digital download, LP | 14 | 2 | 2 | — | — | — | — | — | — | — | US: 205,000 | |
| Til the Casket Drops | Released: December 8, 2009 (US); Labels: Star Trak, Re-Up, Columbia; Formats: CD, digital download, LP | 41 | 9 | 3 | — | — | — | — | — | — | — | US: 62,000 (Note: Sales as of January 20, 2010.) | |
| Let God Sort Em Out (Note: Let God Sort Em Out is credited to Clipse, Pusha T, and Malice on streaming services.) | Released: July 11, 2025 (US); Label: Self-released (Note: Although some sources refer to Roc Nation as the album's label, Rolling Stone makes a distinction between the album's independent release and its distribution through a partnership with Roc Nation Distribution (a subsidiary of Roc Nation), which may not take on all the typical duties of a record label. Def Jam Recordings, originally planned to be the album's label, ended up uninvolved with the album's release but still profits from the album for contractual reasons.); Formats: Cassette, CD, digital download, LP, streaming | 4 | 3 | 2 | 79 | 6 | 15 | 14 | 7 | 16 | 3 | | |
"—" denotes a recording that did not chart or was not released in that territory.

=== Mixtapes ===
List of mixtapes
| Title | Mixtape details |
|---|---|
| We Got It 4 Cheap, Vol. 1 | Released: 2004; Label: Re-Up; Formats: CD-R |
| We Got It 4 Cheap, Vol. 2 | Released: 2005; Label: Re-Up; Formats: CD-R, CD |
| We Got It for Cheap, Vol. 3 | Released: February 5, 2008; Label: Re-Up; Formats: CD-R |
| Road to Til the Casket Drops | Released: December 1, 2008; Label: Self-released; Formats: Digital download |

=== Other albums ===
List of other albums
| Title | Album details |
|---|---|
| Exclusive Audio Footage (Note: Original debut album, shelved from its planned April 1999 release. Officially released on Spotify in 2022.) | Released: May 2, 2022; Label: Elektra, Star Trak; Formats: Streaming |

== Singles ==
=== As lead artist ===
List of singles as a lead artist, with selected chart positions, showing year released and album name
| Title | Year | Peak chart positions | | | | | | | | | | Album |
| Title | Year | US | US R&B | US Rap | US Rhyth. | CAN | NZ Hot | SCO | UK | UK R&B | WW | Album |
|---|---|---|---|---|---|---|---|---|---|---|---|---|
| "The Funeral" | 1999 | — | — | — | — | — | — | — | — | — | — | Exclusive Audio Footage |
| "Grindin'" | 2002 | 30 | 10 | 8 | 37 | — | — | — | — | — | — | Lord Willin' |
| "When the Last Time" | 2002 | 19 | 8 | 7 | 8 | — | — | 60 | 41 | 12 | — | Lord Willin' |
| "Ma, I Don't Love Her" (featuring Faith Evans) | 2002 | 86 | 40 | — | 34 | — | — | 74 | 38 | 11 | — | Lord Willin' |
| "Hot Damn" (featuring Pharrell, Ab-Liva, and Rosco P. Coldchain) | 2003 | — | 58 | — | — | — | — | — | — | — | — | Lord Willin' and Clones |
| "Mr. Me Too" (featuring Pharrell) | 2006 | — | 65 | — | — | — | — | — | — | — | — | Hell Hath No Fury |
| "Wamp Wamp (What It Do)" (featuring Slim Thug) | 2006 | — | 96 | — | — | — | — | — | — | — | — | Hell Hath No Fury |
| "Kinda Like a Big Deal" (featuring Kanye West) | 2009 | — | 119 | — | — | — | — | — | — | — | — | Til the Casket Drops |
| "I'm Good" (featuring Pharrell) | 2009 | — | 27 | 14 | — | — | — | — | — | — | — | Til the Casket Drops |
| "All Eyes on Me" (featuring Keri Hilson) | 2009 | — | — | — | — | — | — | — | — | — | — | Til the Casket Drops |
| "Popular Demand (Popeyes)" (featuring Cam'ron and Pharrell) | 2009 | — | 90 | — | — | — | — | — | — | — | — | Til the Casket Drops |
| "Ace Trumpets" | 2025 | 78 | 26 | — | — | — | — | — | — | — | — | Let God Sort Em Out |
| "So Be It" | 2025 | 62 | 19 | — | — | 97 | 18 | — | — | — | 173 | Let God Sort Em Out |
| "Chains & Whips" (with Kendrick Lamar) | 2025 | 42 | 9 | — | — | 79 | 13 | — | 82 | 21 | 93 | Let God Sort Em Out |
"—" denotes a recording that did not chart or was not released in that territory.

=== As featured artist ===
List of singles as a featured artist, with selected chart positions and certifications, showing year released and album name
| Title | Year | Peak chart positions | | | | | | Certifications | Album |
| Title | Year | US | US R&B | US Rap | US Rhyth. | AUS | UK | Certifications | Album |
|---|---|---|---|---|---|---|---|---|---|
| "Like I Love You" (Justin Timberlake featuring Clipse) | 2002 | 11 | 53 | — | 17 | 8 | 2 | ARIA: Platinum; BPI: Gold | Justified |
| "Star" (702 featuring Clipse) | 2002 | — | 98 | — | — | — | — | | Star |
| "What Happened to That Boy" (Baby featuring Clipse) | 2002 | 45 | 14 | 11 | 38 | — | — | | Birdman |
| "Quarterbackin'" (E-40 featuring Clipse) | 2003 | — | 72 | — | — | — | — | | Breakin' News |
| "So Sick" (Natasha featuring Clipse) | 2007 | — | — | — | — | — | — | | Non-album single |
| "Set It Off" (Kardinal Offishall featuring Clipse) | 2008 | — | — | — | — | — | — | | Not 4 Sale |
| "Community" (JID with Clipse) | 2025 | — | — | — | — | — | — | | God Does Like Ugly |
"—" denotes a recording that did not chart or was not released in that territory.

== Other charted songs ==
| Title | Year | Peak chart positions | | | | Album |
| Title | Year | US | US R&B | NZ Hot | WW | Album |
|---|---|---|---|---|---|---|
| "Pussy" | 2004 | — | 113 | — | — | Barbershop 2: Back in Business soundtrack |
| "Champion" | 2010 | — | 109 | — | — | Til the Casket Drops |
| "Use This Gospel" (Kanye West featuring Clipse and Kenny G) | 2019 | 37 | 20 | — | — | Jesus Is King |
| "The Birds Don't Sing" (featuring John Legend and Voices of Fire) | 2025 | 92 | 30 | 27 | — | Let God Sort Em Out |
| "P.O.V." (featuring Tyler, the Creator) | 2025 | 65 | 21 | 20 | 200 | Let God Sort Em Out |
| "All Things Considered" (featuring The-Dream and Pharrell Williams) | 2025 | — (Note: "All Things Considered" did not enter the Billboard Hot 100, but peaked at number 3 on the Bubbling Under Hot 100 chart.) | 36 | — | — | Let God Sort Em Out |
| "M.T.B.T.T.F." | 2025 | 95 | 32 | — | — | Let God Sort Em Out |
| "E.B.I.T.D.A." (featuring Pharrell Williams) | 2025 | — (Note: "E.B.I.T.D.A." did not enter the Billboard Hot 100, but peaked at number 11 on the Bubbling Under Hot 100 chart.) | 44 | — | — | Let God Sort Em Out |
| "F.I.C.O." (featuring Stove God Cooks) | 2025 | — (Note: "F.I.C.O." did not enter the Billboard Hot 100, but peaked at number 1 on the Bubbling Under Hot 100 chart.) | 34 | — | — | Let God Sort Em Out |
| "Inglorious Bastards" (featuring Ab-Liva) | 2025 | — (Note: "Inglorious Bastards" did not enter the Billboard Hot 100, but peaked at number 17 on the Bubbling Under Hot 100 chart.) | 50 | — | — | Let God Sort Em Out |
| "So Far Ahead" (featuring Pharrell Williams) | 2025 | — (Note: "So Far Ahead" did not enter the Billboard Hot 100, but peaked at number 20 on the Bubbling Under Hot 100 chart.) | — | — | — | Let God Sort Em Out |
| "Let God Sort Em Out/Chandeliers" (featuring Nas) | 2025 | — (Note: "Let God Sort Em Out/Chandeliers" did not enter the Billboard Hot 100, but peaked at number 22 on the Bubbling Under Hot 100 chart.) | — | — | — | Let God Sort Em Out |
"—" denotes a title that did not chart, or was not released in that territory.

== Guest appearances ==
List of non-single guest appearances, with other performing artists, showing year released and album name
| Title | Year | Other artist(s) | Album |
|---|---|---|---|
| "What'cha Wanna Do" (Bang Your Head remix) | 1999 | Pras, Kelis | Non-album single |
| "The Call" (Neptunes remix) | 2001 | Backstreet Boys | The Call: Remixes |
| "Love Don't Love Me" (Neptunes remix) | 2001 | Eric Benét, Pharrell | Non-album single |
| "Guns N Roses" | 2001 | —N/a | Training Day (soundtrack) |
| "Street Tax" | 2001 | Philly's Most Wanted | Get Down or Lay Down |
| "Let's Talk About It" | 2001 | Jermaine Dupri | Instructions |
| "Mister Baller" | 2002 | Royce da 5'9", Pharrell, Tre-Little | Rock City 2.0 |
| "Crew Deep" (The V.A. remix) | 2002 | Skillz, Pharrell, Missy "Misdemeanor" Elliott | Non-album single |
| "Hands Up" (So So Def Remix) | 2002 | TLC | Non-album single |
| "I'm Serious" | 2003 | —N/a | Cradle 2 the Grave (soundtrack) |
| "#1 (Remix)" | 2003 | Nelly, Postaboy | Da Derrty Versions: The Reinvention |
| "Quarterbackin" (DJ Quik remix) | 2003 | E-40 | Breakin' News |
| "Hell Yeah" (Remix) | 2003 | Ginuwine, Baby, R. Kelly | The Senior |
| "Blaze of Glory" | 2003 | Ab-Liva | The Neptunes Present... Clones |
| "Loser" | 2003 | N.E.R.D, Spymob | The Neptunes Present... Clones |
| "Pussy" | 2004 | —N/a | Barbershop 2: Back in Business (soundtrack) |
| "Operator" | 2005 | Ol' Dirty Bastard, Pharrell | A Son Unique |
| "Just a Memory" | 2005 | The Notorious B.I.G. | Duets: The Final Chapter |
| "Where You At" | 2006 | DJ Khaled, Freeway | Listennn... the Album |
| "One Blood" (East Coast remix) | 2006 | The Game, Fabolous, Fat Joe, Jadakiss, Ja Rule, Jim Jones, Juelz Santana, Nas, N.O.R.E., Styles P | Non-album single |
| "I'm Gonna Be" (Remix) | 2006 | Donell Jones | Journey of a Gemini |
| "Cheers" | 2007 | DJ Drama, Pharrell | Gangsta Grillz: The Album |
| "My Hood" | 2009 | Capone-N-Noreaga, Tha Dogg Pound, Maino, Uncle Murda | Channel 10 |
| "Street Wars" | 2010 | Vinnie Paz, Block McCloud | Season of the Assassin |
| "Kilo" | 2010 | Fat Joe | The Darkside, Vol. 1 |
| "Illin'" | 2010 | Young Jeezy | Trap Or Die II: By Any Means Necessary |
| "City of Dreams" | 2011 | Travis Barker, Kobe | Give the Drummer Some |
| "Shame the Devil" | 2013 | No Malice | Hear Ye Him |
| "Use This Gospel" | 2019 | Kanye West, Kenny G | Jesus Is King |
| "Punch Bowl" | 2022 | Nigo | I Know Nigo! |
| "I Pray for You" | 2022 | Pusha T, Labrinth | It's Almost Dry |
| "Look at Me" | 2025 | Mobb Deep | Infinite |
| "No Such Thing" | 2026 | Kehlani | Kehlani |

== Music videos ==
=== As lead artist ===
List of music videos as a lead artist, with directors, showing year released
| Title | Year | Director(s) |
|---|---|---|
| "The Funeral" | 1999 | Marc Klasfeld |
| "Grindin'" | 2002 | Bucky Chrome |
| "When the Last Time" | 2002 | Bucky Chrome |
| "Ma, I Don't Love Her" (featuring Faith Evans) | 2002 | Little X |
| "Hot Damn" (featuring Pharrell, Ab-Liva and Rosco P. Coldchain) | 2003 | Benny Boom |
| "Mr. Me Too" (featuring Pharrell) | 2006 | R. Malcolm Jones |
| "Wamp Wamp (What It Do)" (featuring Slim Thug) | 2006 | R. Malcolm Jones |
| "Kinda Like a Big Deal" (featuring Kanye West) | 2009 | Bernard Gourley |
| "I'm Good" (featuring Pharrell) | 2009 | Dayo |
| "Popular Demand (Popeyes)" (featuring Cam'ron and Pharrell) | 2009 | Rik Cordero |
| "So Be It" | 2025 | Hannan Hussain |
| "Chains & Whips" (with Kendrick Lamar) | 2025 | Gabriel Moses |
| "The Birds Don't Sing" (featuring John Legend and Voices of Fire) | 2025 | Brendan O'Connor |
| "F.I.C.O." (featuring Stove God Cooks) | 2025 | Hannan Hussain |
| "P.O.V." (featuring Tyler, the Creator) | 2025 | Cole Bennett |

=== As featured artist ===
List of music videos as a featured artist, with directors, showing year released
| Title | Year | Director(s) |
|---|---|---|
| "Like I Love You" (Justin Timberlake featuring Clipse) | 2002 | Diane Martel |
| "Star" (702 featuring Clipse) | 2002 | |
| "What Happened to That Boy" (Baby featuring Clipse) | 2002 | Benny Boom |
| "Quarterbackin'" (E40 featuring Clipse) | 2003 | |
| "So Sick" (Natasha featuring Clipse) | 2007 | |
| "Set It Off" (Kardinal Offshall featuring Clipse) | 2008 | |
| "Community" (JID with Clipse) | 2025 | Omar Jones |

== See also ==
- Malice discography
- Pusha T discography
