= M.T.B.T.T.F. =

2025 song by Clipse

Song by Clipse

from the album Let God Sort Em Out
- Released: July 11, 2025
- Recorded: 2023‒2024
- Genre: Hip-hop
- Length: 2:36
- Label: Self-released
- Songwriters: Terrence Thornton; Gene Thornton; Pharrell Williams
- Producer: Pharrell Williams

"M.T.B.T.T.F." (an abbreviation of "Mike Tyson Blow to the Face") is a song by American hip-hop duo Clipse from their fourth studio album, Let God Sort Em Out (2025). It was produced by Pharrell Williams.

== Composition ==
The song has been described as evocative of 1990s hip-hop. Music critics have compared Pusha T and Malice's performances to that of The Notorious B.I.G., Kool G Rap, RZA and Run-DMC. They open each verse rapping a cappella, before samples are played, which along with Pharrell's production has been considered reminiscent of golden age hip-hop. The production is described as boom bap and similar to Pete Rock's style.

== Critical reception ==
The song received critical acclaim. Kiana Fitzgerald of Consequence wrote that it "proves Clipse is capable of performing old tricks and new tricks, too." Alphonse Pierre of Pitchfork stated "It's high on their usual lyrical theatrics, but they're not trying too hard to grab headlines", adding "Just Pusha and Malice getting sinister and mythic over a hard beat. I'll take that." Niall Smith of Clash lauded the song for its "Clever use of a cappella negative space and boom-bap-style drums". Marko Djurdjić of Exclaim! described the song as "pure '90s throwback, referencing the best of RZA" and Clipse as "dropping show-stopping lines". Reviewing Let God Sort Em Out for AllMusic, Fred Thomas commented "As with everything they've done before it, the album boils down to the visceral talent and pummeling magic that happens whenever Clipse are rapping. This is exemplified on the simmering 'M.T.B.T.T.F.' (short for the appropriately titled 'Mike Tyson Blow to the Face')".

== Charts ==
Chart performance for "M.T.B.T.T.F."
Chart (2025)	Peak position
US Billboard Hot 100	95
US Hot R&B/Hip-Hop Songs (Billboard)	32
