= Fico =

Fico or FICO may refer to:

- Fico (surname), a surname
- Hurricane Fico, a hurricane in the 1978 Pacific hurricane season
- FICO or Fair Isaac, an American company
  - FICO score, a credit score
- "F.I.C.O.", song by Clipse featuring Stove God Cooks
- Financing Corporation, an entity created to finance debts from the United States savings and loan crisis
