= Chains & Whips =

2025 promotional single by Clipse and Kendrick Lamar

Promotional single by Clipse and Kendrick Lamar

from the album Let God Sort Em Out
- Released: July 10, 2025
- Recorded: 2023‒2024
- Studio: Louis Vuitton headquarters (Paris)
- Genre: Hip-hop
- Length: 4:03
- Label: Self-released
- Songwriters: Terrence Thornton; Gene Thornton; Kendrick Duckworth; Pharrell Williams
- Producer: Pharrell Williams

Music video
- "Chains & Whips" on YouTube

"Chains & Whips" is a song by American hip-hop duo Clipse and American rapper Kendrick Lamar from Clipse's fourth studio album, Let God Sort Em Out (2025), released independently with distribution assisted by Roc Nation Distribution. Although not an official single in its own right, it was made available early on the album's Apple Music page in the late hours of July 10, 2025, the evening before the album's release. It was produced by Pharrell Williams.

== Background ==
Producer Pharrell Williams first teased the song at the Louis Vuitton Men's Spring–Summer Show 2024 on June 20, 2023. Pusha T's verse was reported to be a response to rapper Jim Jones for siding with Drake in his feud with Pusha; earlier in the year, Drake brought Jones out as a guest at his concerts and Jones called Drake the "official 5th member of Dipset". Not long after, Jones criticized Billboard's inclusion of Pusha T in their "50 Greatest Rappers of All Time" list on the Rap Caviar podcast and later, during an interview with The Breakfast Club, challenged the hosts to "sing along to five Pusha T records right now". In the days following the song's preview, Jones responded by poking fun at Pusha's music and posting a video of him rapping over the beat of "Chains & Whips". In his lyrics, Jones references "What Happened to That Boy" by Baby featuring Clipse, says he will "go find you out in Paris" and alludes to Malice having a drug problem.

== Production ==
According to Pusha T, "Chains & Whips" was the first song from Let God Sort Em Out to be recorded. Like most of the album, it was recorded at the Louis Vuitton headquarters in Paris. During one of the recording sessions, Kendrick Lamar's publisher happened to be in the studio with Clipse. He listened and called Lamar, suggesting he should appear on the album. Clipse sent him "Chains & Whips" and "So Be It". Lamar wanted to rap on both tracks, but was in the middle of his feud with Drake and working on his album GNX, so he quickly sent a verse for only "Chains & Whips". On the first day of Louis Vuitton's Fashion Week in June 2025, Clipse and Pharrell previewed "Chains & Whips", including Lamar's verse. They played the album on the rooftop of the Paris headquarters for a crowd of people.

== Composition and lyrics ==
The song contains "organ-filled, bass-heavy" production with electric guitar played by Lenny Kravitz, drums and horns. Clipse raps about the pursuit of wealth and incorporates themes of death in their lyrics. The chorus features the line "Beat the system with chains and whips", which is a double entendre alluding to slavery and purchasing jewelry and cars (whip being a slang term for a car). Pusha T addresses the risks of obsessively seeking riches, such as diamonds and cash, and attention. He directs criticism at those engaging in this behavior, referring to many rappers but especially Jim Jones: "You think it'd be valor amongst veterans / I'm watching your fame escape relevance / We all in a room, but here's the elephant / You're chasing a feature out of your element". The luxury watch brand Richard Mille is also referenced ("Richard don't make watches for presidents / Just a million trapped between skeletons").

Kendrick Lamar opens his verse with the lyrics, "I'm not the candidate to vibe with / I don't fuck with the kumbaya shit / All that talent must be God-sent / I sent yo ass back to the cosmics". He discusses facing various traumas and conflicts in the midst of his fame, systemic inequity, and the current direction of hip-hop, which he implies to be declining, highlighting that the genre's pioneers have gone unacknowledged: "Let's be clear, hip-hop died again / Half of my profits may go to Rakim". Lamar additionally performs in a rhyme scheme involving words that start with the "gen" sound.

== Controversy ==
The aforementioned feud resulted in Drake suing Universal Music Group for defamation over the promotion of Lamar's song "Not Like Us". When Clipse presented Let God Sort Em Out to Def Jam Recordings, a subsidiary of UMG, the label wanted them to censor Lamar's verse and when Clipse refused, asked them to remove "Chains & Whips" from the album. After months of dispute, Clipse (and Pusha T as a solo artist) left Def Jam, buying themselves out of the deal. Although Def Jam claimed they requested Lamar's verse to be removed because of concerns that it would cause conflict with President Donald Trump due its usage of the phrase "Trump card", Pusha T has suggested that the true reason was their discomfort with a collaboration between two bitter rivals of Drake. Pusha believes such fears were unreasonable, as Lamar does not diss Drake in his verse.

== Critical reception ==
“Chains & Whips” received mostly positive reviews. Billboard's Mackenzie Cummings-Grady ranked "Chains & Whips" as the best song from Let God Sort Em Out. Tom Breihan of Stereogum commented "'Chains & Whips' sounds nasty, and it's got Kendrick Lamar going into that state where he channels demon energies." Simon Vozick-Levinson of Rolling Stone stated "'Chains & Whips' boasts a squeaky, freaky beat from their old buddy Pharrell (who produced this album solo, after his split from Neptunes wingman Chad Hugo) and a scene-stealing verse from Kendrick Lamar." Alexis Petridis of The Guardian called it "dazzling and pugilistic". With respect to Kendrick Lamar's feature, Kyann-Sian Williams of NME wrote "It's clear he's hijacked the entire album's emotional centre – the one true moment where the record actually feels dangerous and alive." Variety's Peter A. Berry described the music as a "soundbed made for dystopian Westerns" and remarked "Push's taunting whisper of a delivery is sly and sadistic, with his soft voice and the space around it distilling his disgust in 4K: 'Jealousy's turnin' into obsession / Reality TV is mud wrestlin'.' For his part, Kendrick matches Push and Malice's viciousness with more outward venom, even if his verse feels more theatrical than cutting." Pitchfork's Alphonse Pierre criticized Pharrell's production, commenting that "his twangy melodies on 'Chains & Whips' belong in something like the heavy-handed musical sequence in Sinners, not behind Pusha bragging about his watch collection."

=== Accolades ===
Organization	Year	Category	Result	Ref.
Grammy Awards	2026	Best Rap Performance	Won	
BET Awards	2026	Best Collaboration	Won	
MTV Video Music Awards	2026	Best Collaboration	Pending	

=== Year-end listings ===
Publication	Accolade	Rank	Ref.
Exclaim!	20 Best Songs of 2025	17	
HotNewHipHop	The 30 Best Rap Songs Of 2025	25	
Stereogum	The 50 Best Songs Of 2025	17	

== Live performances ==
On 23 August 2025, the duo and Kendrick Lamar performed the song together during the Los Angeles, California concert at The Novo, from the duo's Let God Sort Em Out Tour.

== Music video ==
An official music video premiered on July 14, 2025. Directed by Gabriel Moses, it is nearly five minutes long. Clipse appears in the clip, while Kendrick Lamar does not. It features frequent displays of the American flag and scenes with distorted, stretched-out effects, including shots of daily life, beauty pageants and church services. A man runs from the police and is put in prison, with the visual also exploring life in prison. The video ends with an a cappella rendition of Clipse's "Grindin'" performed by two women standing on a porch.

== Charts ==
Chart performance for "Chains & Whips"
Chart (2025)	Peak position
Canada Hot 100 (Billboard)	79
Global 200 (Billboard)	93
New Zealand Hot Singles (RMNZ)	13
UK Singles (Official Charts)	82
UK Hip Hop/R&B (Official Charts)	21
UK Indie (Official Charts)	20
US Billboard Hot 100	42
US Hot R&B/Hip-Hop Songs (Billboard)	9
