= The Birds Don't Sing =

2025 song by Clipse featuring John Legend and Voices of Fire

Song by Clipse featuring John Legend and Voices of Fire

from the album Let God Sort Em Out
- Released: July 11, 2025
- Recorded: 2023–2024
- Genre: Hip-hop; Christian hip-hop
- Length: 4:00
- Label: Self-released
- Songwriters: Terrence Thornton; Gene Thornton; Stevie Wonder; Pharrell Williams
- Producer: Pharrell Williams

Music video
- "The Birds Don't Sing" on YouTube

"The Birds Don't Sing" is a song by American hip-hop duo Clipse from their fourth studio album, Let God Sort Em Out (2025). It features gospel choir Voices of Fire and uncredited vocals from American singer John Legend. Produced by Pharrell Williams, the song revolves around Clipse dealing with the loss of their parents, the related feelings of remorse, and the influence those losses have on them.

The song's idea was conceived after Pusha T's conversation with Williams based on the death of the former's mother in November 2021. Reflecting on the declining health of his father, who died four months later, Malice conceived the title, which was inspired by Maya Angelou's I Know Why the Caged Bird Sings (1969). "The Birds Don't Sing" was recorded during sessions for Let God Sort Em Out, and first previewed at a Louis Vuitton fashion show in June 2024.

"The Birds Don't Sing" received generally positive reviews from music critics, praising Clipse's lyricism and emotional depth, while being more skeptical on the chorus and production. The song appeared on three Billboard charts and New Zealand's singles chart, as well as performed at the NPR Tiny Desk Concerts, The Tonight Show Starring Jimmy Fallon, the duo's North American concert tour, and the Grace for the World concert during the 2025 Jubilee in Vatican City. "The Birds Don't Sing" was nominated for Best Rap Song at the 68th Annual Grammy Awards.

== Background ==
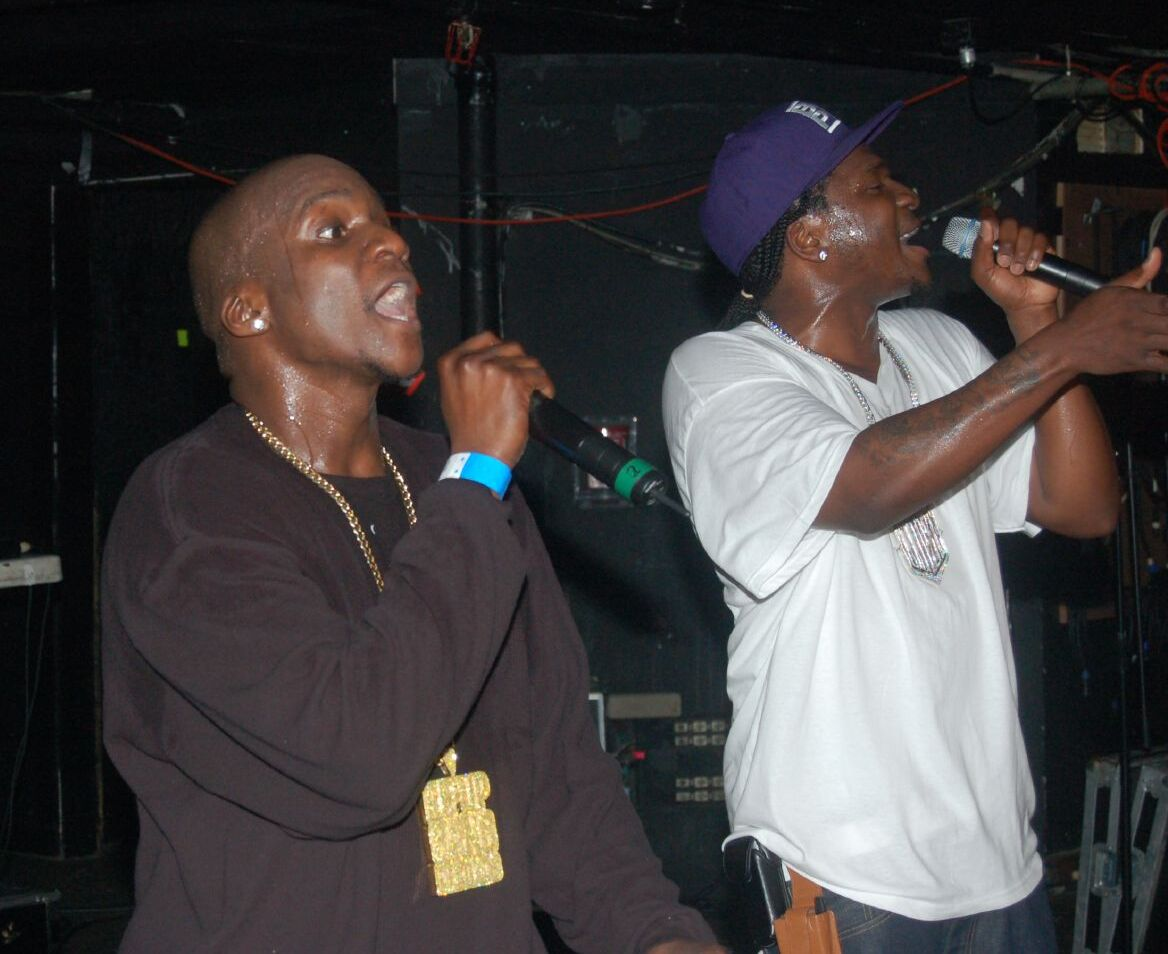
"The Birds Don't Sing" is based on Malice (left) and Pusha T's experience on the loss of their parents within four months, writing individual verses based on their perspectives.

According to Pusha T, the song was built from his conversation with Williams about the death of his mother, Mildred Thornton, who died in November 2021. At the time, Williams' father was undergoing kidney dialysis, and Pusha expressed guilt at constantly pushing his mother to stay healthy as she went through the same process, when she was ready to live out her life. Pusha noted that his brother Malice had said, "You think the birds are singing, but they're really screeching in pain." Malice came up with the title, which was inspired by writer and activist Maya Angelou's 1969 autobiography I Know Why the Caged Bird Sings. Four months following Mildred's death, their father, Gene Elliot Thornton Sr., died in March 2022.

Clipse began production on Let God Sort Em Out shortly after the 65th Annual Grammy Awards, which took place in February 2023. "The Birds Don't Sing" was one of the songs worked on the album. When the duo recorded the song, Pusha stated that everyone in the office was crying during the process. The song was first previewed at a Louis Vuitton fashion show on June 18, 2024, a day before they confirmed the album's existence. In December, the album was reported to be complete. Clipse began promoting Let God Sort Em Out with the release of its lead single, "Ace Trumpets", on May 30, 2025, followed by the release of the promotional single, "So Be It", on June 17. On July 11, the album was released independently, receiving critical acclaim and commercial success.

During Clipse's interview with Ari Melber on MSNBC in July 2025, Malice stated that their parents did not understand their music, but still supported them. He also explained the meaning behind some lyrics of the song. When organizing paperwork and personal documents at home, Malice entered in his father's passwords for various accounts, including his phone, which consisted of variations of the phrase, "I love my two sons." He recalled trying to tell his father the password, becoming emotional and unable to fully say it. His father repeatedly asked what he had said, with Malice confirming that it said "I love my two sons." He later described the moment as "very touching", adding that his father was deeply family-oriented. Retrospectively, he said his father's life was defined by his focus on family, which was what he was widely known for. "The Birds Don't Sing" later received a nomination for Best Rap Song at the 68th Annual Grammy Awards.

== Composition ==
"The Birds Don't Sing"
Under a piano-driven instrumental, Pusha T reflects on his personal events leading up to his mother's death.

The song contains piano-driven production, which additionally consists of "distorted vocal scratches and galloping percussion". With elements of gospel rap, it finds Clipse mourning their deceased parents and reflecting on their last conversations with them, while John Legend performs the chorus. In the opening verse, Pusha T recounts his mother's impact on her children's lives, her last days and his difficulty processing her death, and details feeling guilty that he was so fixated on his career that he did not realize she was dying. As her death was imminent, she revealed some important, personal things about her life to him, including regretting that she separated from his father. However, Pusha barely listened as he was preoccupied with business and music; he was rushing to meet with Kanye West at Elon Musk's house and scrolling through his phone. She died sooner than he expected, and he could only look back on it with regret.

In one line, Pusha also mentions his son Nigel meeting her and is disappointed that he will not remember her. In the second verse, Malice first narrates his final memory of his father, who died a few months after their mother. Malice found his body in his home, which left him in a reflective state. His father's words inspired him to return to rapping (and eventually create Let God Sort Em Out). In addition, Malice considers that his father also took care of his friends, as most of them did not have fathers in their lives, and that despite imparting wisdom in his upbringing, his sons still ended up selling cocaine. The song ends with an orchestral string section and choral harmonies, as Legend and the Voices of Fire sing the concluding notes.

== Critical reception ==
"The Birds Don't Sing" received generally positive reviews, with particular praise direct towards its lyricism, while some critics were hesitant on the chorus and production. Writing for Stereogum, Tom Breihan highlighted Clipse's sharp wit and precise storytelling, noting that the song applies these elements to explore "what must be the darkest, heaviest moments of their lives." Simon Vozick-Levinson of Rolling Stone described Pusha T's verse as a significant addition to rap songs about mothers and considered Malice's contribution emotionally affecting, describing the song as evidence of the duo's artistic maturation into reflection.

Reviewing Let God Sort Em Out for The Guardian, Alexis Petridis viewed "The Birds Don't Sing" as a slight stylistic misstep, considering John Legend's chorus to be commercial, although he noted the vivid and emotionally intense lyrics based on the near-simultaneous deaths of the duo's parents redeems it. Niall Smith of Clash similarly felt that the song's slightly theatrical production was overshadowed by the song's sincere emotional depth, particularly in its portrayal of recurring familial loss. Variety's Peter A. Berry described Malice's performance as deeply reflective and nostalgic in tone, suggesting an emotional warmth in his delivery, and likened the song's atmosphere to the "opening of heaven's gates."

Reviewing the album for AllMusic, Fred Thomas wrote that "The Birds Don't Sing" amplifies Clipse's enduring intensity and lyrical power, arguing that even a conventional beat and mainstream vocal feature doesn't diminish the impact of its themes on parental loss, self-awareness, and regret. He further observed that the duo balances their earlier intensity with a sense of maturity, spirituality, and reflection, conveying "hard-learned lessons" without abandoning their established "time-tested fury." By the end of 2025, HotNewHipHop ranked the song as the best rap song of the year.

== Commercial success ==
Upon the release of "The Birds Don't Sing", it debuted at number 92 on the Billboard Hot 100 and number 30 on the U.S. Hot R&B/Hip-Hop Songs chart on July 26, 2025, both lasting a week. It later debuted on the U.S. Rhythmic Airplay chart on October 18, peaking at number 28 two weeks later. The song's placement lasted for fifteen weeks. Internationally, "The Birds Don't Sing" debuted and peaked at number 27 on the New Zealand Hot Singles chart.

== Music video ==
An official music video premiered on October 1, 2025. Directed by Brendan O'Connor, Clipse appears in the video, while John Legend does not. The video opens with a clip of Pusha T lifting his son, Nigel, to place flowers at the gravesite of his grandparents. Throughout the music video, the duo visits their childhood home in Virginia where they grew up. With Pusha T rapping, family photos featuring his mother appear throughout his verse.

Pivoting to Malice in the dining room, he reflects on his bond with his father, as pictures of him and his achievements, including as an official deacon, display throughout his verse. Symbolically, church imagery appears throughout the house, as well as shots of a pregnant woman, serving as an ode to their mother. In addition, the music video features an appearance by Tyrod Taylor, a Virginia-native American football quarterback, sitting in the bleachers with his father next to his high school.

== Live performances ==
On July 11, 2025, within the release of Let God Sort Em Out, Clipse performed "The Birds Don't Sing" at the NPR Tiny Desk Concerts. On July 15, Clipse performed the song on The Tonight Show Starring Jimmy Fallon, in which they stood against a backdrop of archival photos. "The Birds Don't Sing" was later included on the set list of their North American concert tour, lasting from August 3, in Boston to September 10, in Detroit.

During the 2025 Jubilee, the World Meeting on Human Fraternity 2025 took place in St. Peter's Square in Vatican City on September 12 and 13, with concert of Andrea Bocelli, Pharrell Williams with the gospel choir Voices of Fire, and John Legend. Clipse performed "The Birds Don't Sing" in matching black suits along with Legend on the second date during the Grace for the World concert on September 13, making history for being the first rappers to ever perform in Vatican City. It was also live streamed worldwide on ABC News Live, Hulu, and Disney+.

== Credits and personnel ==
Credits are adapted from the liner notes of Let God Sort Em Out.

=== Locations ===
- Recorded and mixed at Louis Vuitton Studios, Paris, France
- Recorded at The Library Room, Miami, Florida
- Recorded at Mastersound Studios, Virginia Beach, Virginia
- Recorded at The Bakehouse Studios, Virginia Beach, Virginia
- Recorded at Milkboy/The Studio, Philadelphia, Pennsylvania
- Recorded at Huntley Studios, Hollywood, California
- Mixed and mastered at Larrabee Studios, North Hollywood, California

=== Musicians ===
- Terrence Thornton – lead vocals, writing
- Gene Thornton – lead vocals, writing
- Pharrell Williams – writing, production, mixing
- Stevie Wonder – writing, piano, spoken word
- Alrenzo Albritton – tenor vocals
- Megan Buhmann – soprano vocals
- Jazmine Canales – alto vocals
- Natasha Colkett – violin
- Gared Crawford – violin
- Vivian Barton Dozor – celli
- Blake Espy – violin
- Glenn Fischbach – celli
- Ghislaine Fleishchmann – violin
- Larry George – choir co-director, tenor vocals
- Larry Gold – orchestra conductor, string arrangement
- T. Alexandria Gray – soprano vocals
- Lauren Hendrick – soprano vocals
- Trenise Holloman – alto vocals
- Johnathan Kim – viola
- Emma Kummrow – violin
- Charlene Kwas – violin
- Jahzeel Mumford – tenor vocals
- Yoshihiko Nakano – viola
- Maria Rosado – alto vocals
- Steve Tirpak – string arrangement
- Voices of Fire – choir vocals
- Colette William – alto vocals
- Bishop Ezekiel Williams – choir director

=== Technical ===
- Mike Larson – mixing, engineering, additional programming, arrangement
- Manny Marroquin – mixing
- Tim McClain – engineering
- Jim Parroco – second engineering
- Zach Pereyra – mastering
- Cristian F. Perez – engineering
- Jeff Shestek – engineering
- Trey Station – assistant mixing
- Matthew Ticconi – second engineering
- Rob Ulsh – engineering
- Anthony Vilchis – assistant mixing

== Charts ==
Chart performance for "The Birds Don't Sing"
Chart (2025)	Peak position
New Zealand Hot Singles (RMNZ)	27
US Billboard Hot 100	92
US Hot R&B/Hip-Hop Songs (Billboard)	30
US Rhythmic Airplay (Billboard)	28
