= P.O.V. (song) =

2025 song by Clipse featuring Tyler, the Creator

Song by Clipse featuring Tyler, the Creator

from the album Let God Sort Em Out
- Released: July 11, 2025
- Recorded: 2023‒2024, May 24-25, 2025
- Genre: Hip-hop
- Length: 4:18
- Label: Self-released
- Songwriters: Terrence Thornton; Gene Thornton; Tyler Okonma; Pharrell Williams
- Producer: Pharrell Williams

"P.O.V." is a song by American hip-hop duo Clipse, released on July 11, 2025 from their fourth studio album, Let God Sort Em Out (2025). It features American rapper Tyler, the Creator and was produced by Pharrell Williams.

== Background and composition ==
Tyler, the Creator stated in an interview that he had re-recorded his verse "79 to 100 times" and that "It took me so long to write that and just trying to perfect it."

The production consists of drums and synths. Lyrically, Pusha T directs further shots at Jim Jones and criticizes rappers who do not treat hip-hop music seriously while Malice references his spiritual journey. The rappers also use puns in relation to expensive cars.

The line "Little feature, niggas threaten to sue me? / Tell your lawyer to set the fee" from Tyler, the Creator's verse gained notable attention from fans. Some speculated it was aimed at rappers Drake (who has a high-profile feud with Pusha T), Playboi Carti, Frank Ocean, or even ASAP Rocky. Tyler explained the meaning behind the line on X, stating "and an old friend ive made music with threatened to sue me over a feature they gave me (so yall dont run with a narrative)".

== Critical reception ==
The song received generally positive reviews. Simon Vozick-Levinson of Rolling Stone called it "a showcase for their finest luxury-car wordplay". Clash's Niall Smith considered it a standout from Let God Sort Em Out that "has golden-age Clipse written all over it; kinetic, cutthroat drums creeping beneath the floorboards of the trio's rhymes." Marko Djurdjić of Exclaim! wrote "'P.O.V.' features numerous flips and turns, with sinister synths, spacey ambience, and silence all helping to define the respective verses. Tyler, the Creator even manages to hold his own, albeit barely, with some of his most inventive lines to date ('My n***a Push keep dirty white moving like mosh pits')." Kyann-Sian Williams of NME stated that "Tyler, the Creator injects his wild, signature mischief on 'P.O.V.'" and praised the song for its "catchy staccato chorus", calling it one of the album's "sparks of the old magic". Pitchfork's Alphonse Pierre commented "Repping the Neptunes classicists is Tyler, the Creator trying to match Push and Malice's shit talk on 'P.O.V.' (Clipse wipe the floor with him.)" Variety's Peter A. Berry described the song's production as "spotless, but somewhat unimaginative", commenting "'P.O.V.' could have been produced anytime between 'Fear of God' and 'My Name Is My Name.'" Alexander Cole of HotNewHipHop wrote "Quite simply, Tyler is talking his sh*t on this song. The same can be said of Pusha T and Malice, who are firing on all cylinders with this track. Meanwhile, the production is sinister, expensive, and everything you would want it to be."

== Music video ==
An official music video premiered on December 10, 2025. Directed by Cole Bennett, it features the Rock-afire Explosion animatronic band at a dimly lit restaurant setting, with the Clipse brothers and Tyler, The Creator sitting at a table, wearing black attire. Halfway through Tyler's verse, he steps onto the table and dances, before jumping off the table and onto the empty space in front of the stage the animatronic band were performing on, dancing while Pusha T performs the chorus, the curtains closing as well. Tyler sits back down as Malice performs his verse. The curtains open again, revealing the skinned animatronics, leaving their endoskeletons moving. As the final chorus plays, the camera shakily moves away from the three and moves focus to the stripped animatronics moving until the song ends and cuts to the credits.

== Charts ==
Chart performance for "P.O.V."
Chart (2025)	Peak position
Global 200 (Billboard)	200
New Zealand Hot Singles (RMNZ)	20
US Billboard Hot 100	65
US Hot R&B/Hip-Hop Songs (Billboard)	21
