= F.I.C.O. =

2025 song by Clipse featuring Stove God Cooks

Song by Clipse featuring Stove God Cooks

from the album Let God Sort Em Out
- Released: July 11, 2025
- Recorded: 2023‒2024
- Genre: Hip-hop
- Length: 3:21
- Label: Self-released
- Songwriters: Terrence Thornton; Gene Thornton; Aaron Cook; Pharrell Williams
- Producer: Williams

Music video
- "F.I.C.O." on YouTube

"F.I.C.O." is a song by American hip-hop duo Clipse from their fourth studio album, Let God Sort Em Out (2025). It features American rapper Stove God Cooks and was produced by Pharrell Williams.

== Critical reception ==
The song received critical acclaim, with many music critics praising the chorus performed by Stove God Cooks. Mackenzie Cummings-Grady of Billboard ranked it as the fifth best song from Let God Sort Em Out, describing Stove God Cooks as performing "one hell of a hook" and that he "adds a shot of adrenaline to Clipse's motivational bars." She added, "Altogether, it amounts to an inspiring track about grinding through the mud, and proves it's almost impossible to have too much Stove God on a track. Even though he's just on the hook, it feels like Clipse are fighting for their life amidst the God." Simon Vozick-Levinson of Rolling Stone wrote the song "recounts high-stakes turnpike trips vividly enough to send a chill up your spine." Tom Breihan of Stereogum wrote "The on-record chemistry is crazy. Consider 'F.I.C.O.,' with its hesitation gut-splat beat and Griselda affiliate Stove God Cooks crooning gutturally on the hook. Malice and Pusha come in with tricky, intricate flows, and they both tell absorbing, economical stories about the lives that they've left behind." Clash's Niall Smith lauded the song's "clever" use of "boots-on-the-ground storytelling", while Pitchfork's Alphonse Pierre commented the song would appease the "East Coast drug rap aficionados" of the Clipse fandom due to its "sleepy" hook. Reviewing the album for HotNewHipHop, Aron A. stated "The moments when they do dive deeper into that territory yield phenomenal results. 'F.I.C.O.', for example, could turn Stove God Cooks into hip-hop's go-to hook man. His soulful, smoky delivery ties together Push and Malice's flashbacks of dodging K9s and navigating pissy hallways. It reminds listeners that the Clipse may have evolved spiritually and professionally, but they haven't forgotten how to paint the world that raised them. And that world is encompassed in a love for hip-hop above all else."

== Music video ==
An official music video was directed by Hannan Hussain and released on November 12, 2025. In it, Pusha T cruises through the rainy streets of New York City in the backseat of a luxury car, and appears alongside Malice in an empty apartment building, where they are seen in a dim stairwell and living room; the setting represents the environment described in the track. In one moment, Pusha sits in the back of the car as a body is loaded into the trunk. Stove God Cooks appears from the outside the driver's window. The clip is shot through black-and-white visuals serving as imagery of the lyrics, in collage with muted color scenes in which the rappers appear.

== Charts ==
Chart performance for "F.I.C.O."
Chart (2025)	Peak position
US Bubbling Under Hot 100 (Billboard)	1
US Hot R&B/Hip-Hop Songs (Billboard)	34
