= Let God Sort Em Out =

2025 studio album by Clipse

Studio album by Clipse (Note: Pusha T and Malice are additionally credited on streaming services.)
- Released: July 11, 2025
- Recorded: 2023‒2024 (Note: Officially given timeline, although some recording may have taken place in 2025. Recording sessions started sometime after the 65th Annual Grammy Awards on February 5, 2023. Pusha T claimed that the album was finished in an interview on December 7, 2024. After name-dropping "Yeezy", a nickname for musician Kanye West and the name of his fashion brand, in lead single "Ace Trumpets", Pusha T goes on to rap a lyric believed by some listeners and journalists to be a reference to rants by West in March and April 2025.)
- Studios: Louis Vuitton headquarters (Paris); Masterworks (Virginia Beach) (Note: In an interview published on July 1, 2025, Pusha T stated: "We recorded this whole project at the, um, Louis Vuitton headquarters in Paris." Other sources state that some of the album was recorded in Virginia. Although the interview in which Pusha T says the "whole project" was recorded in Paris came after these other sources, and could therefore reflect changes to the track listing, a source stating that a "majority" of the album was recorded in Paris comes after the album was confirmed to be finished.); Others: The Bakehouse (Virginia Beach); Other Island (Miami); The Library Room (Miami); Milkboy/The Studio (Philadelphia); Huntley (Hollywood); Gregory Town Sound (Eleuthera, the Bahamas); Dream Boy ATL (Atlanta); Sessions Atlanta (Atlanta); Jungle City (New York City)
- Genre: Hip-hop
- Length: 40:47
- Label: Self-released (Note: Although some sources refer to Roc Nation as the album's label, Rolling Stone makes a distinction between the album's independent release and its distribution through a partnership with Roc Nation Distribution (a subsidiary of Roc Nation), which may not take on all the typical duties of a record label. Def Jam Recordings, originally planned to be the album's label, ended up uninvolved with the album's release but still profits from the album for contractual reasons.)
- Producer: Pharrell Williams

Clipse chronology
Til the Casket Drops (2009)	Let God Sort Em Out (2025)

Singles from Let God Sort Em Out
- 1. "Ace Trumpets" Released: May 30, 2025

Let God Sort Em Out is the fourth (Note: As per promotional material. Some sources may label Let God Sort Em Out as the duo's fifth album, counting Exclusive Audio Footage (1999), intended to be the duo's first album. Initially limited to promotional copies that later leaked online, it was officially released via streaming services in 2022.) studio album by the American hip-hop duo Clipse. Self-released on July 11, 2025, it marks the duo's first album since Til the Casket Drops (2009); Pusha T and Malice split in 2010, before reuniting in 2019 and starting work on the album in 2023. Longtime collaborator and mentor Pharrell Williams returns as the album's executive and only producer after splitting with his Neptunes collaborator Chad Hugo; he also appears as a guest, alongside Ab-Liva (of Clipse side-project Re-Up Gang), John Legend, Kendrick Lamar, Nas, Stove God Cooks, The-Dream, Tyler, the Creator, and the choir ensemble Voices of Fire. Additional contributors include Lenny Kravitz and Stevie Wonder.

Rumors of a new Clipse album started in 2023 when Williams, who became creative director of menswear at luxury fashion house Louis Vuitton the same year, included a new Clipse song in the soundtrack to the Louis Vuitton Men's Spring-Summer 2024 Show. The album's recording sessions were primarily split between studios in the trio's home state of Virginia and the Louis Vuitton headquarters in Paris, France. Originally planned for a 2024 release, the album was delayed when the duo's then-label Def Jam Recordings and its parent company Universal Music Group demanded Lamar's guest verse on "Chains & Whips" be either censored or removed. Although the label cited worry about blowback from United States President Donald Trump due to the lyrics, Pusha T publicly claimed it was over his and Lamar's public feuds with rapper Drake, who filed a lawsuit against Universal in 2025 for its publication of Lamar's diss "Not Like Us". Refusing to censor the verse, Clipse paid a seven-figure sum to be dropped from the deal, signing a distribution deal with Roc Nation instead but giving Def Jam a percentage of the profits from the album. The album's lyrical content and promotional press received media attention for Pusha T's outspoken criticism of his rivals Drake and Jim Jones, as well as former creative partners Kanye West and Travis Scott.

Let God Sort Em Out received critical acclaim upon release, with critics praising the duo's raw, introspective lyricism and longstanding chemistry. It was preceded by one single, "Ace Trumpets", released on May 30, 2025. Although no other songs were released as standalone singles, "Chains & Whips" and "So Far Ahead" were serviced to Apple Music the evening before its release; the former would also receive a music video along with "So Be It". Clipse embarked on the Let God Sort Em Out Tour with EarthGang from August to November 2025 in additional promotion of the album.

== Background ==
=== Collaborative history with Pharrell Williams ===
As a teenage rapper, Malice met music producers Chad Hugo and Pharrell Williams in 1988 and 1990, respectively. Hugo and Williams knew each other and would go on to form the production duo the Neptunes. One day, Pusha T was at Hugo's house and started rapping. Impressed, Williams convinced the brothers to form a rap duo. Clipse's intended debut album, Exclusive Audio Footage (1999), was shelved by Elektra Records; their actual debut Lord Willin' was released by the Neptunes' record label Star Trak Entertainment in 2002. (Note: Vozick-Levinson's article for Rolling Stone claims that the brothers knew Pharrell first, who introduced them to Hugo. Various sources throughout the years make claims and give time frames which contradict the given years of 1988 and 1990. However, these years, from Williams' article for Red Bull Music Academy, have been used as they are the most specific and come from direct quotes by Malice.) The Neptunes would go on to have production credits on every commercially released studio album by Clipse until the latter's disbandment.

Williams claimed to not be on speaking terms with Hugo in 2024 in light of a lawsuit from the latter against him over claims that he was monopolizing the Neptunes name. When asked in 2024 if Clipse worked with Hugo on Let God Sort Em Out, Pusha T denied it. He also responded not being "familiar with" the lawsuit. Clipse stated in 2025 that they still have a strong personal relationship with Hugo, although they differed on whether they missed working with him musically; Pusha T stated that his favorite Clipse album Hell Hath No Fury (2006) was produced entirely by Williams. Malice references the breakup on promotional single "So Be It"—"Ain't no more Neptunes, so P's Saturn."

=== Clipse's breakup and reunion ===
"My dad was instrumental in my decision-making. I asked him what he thought about me rapping again, and he said, 'You still have to make a living. You still have to take care of your family. I understand where you're coming from, but I think you've been too hard on yourself.' And that meant so much to me because over the years, the Clipse years, our family really went through a lot. For him to give me his blessing, him being a deacon in the church and loving God, I had to open my eyes and reevaluate."

— Malice, in a June 2024 interview for Vulture.

Til the Casket Drops (2009) was the final Clipse album before the duo split to make solo material. The breakup was initiated by Malice, who had multiple conversations with Pusha T about quitting the duo; the first time was after a studio session with Rick Rubin. Toward the end of the duo's partnership, their then-manager and various people in their personal lives were arrested on drug charges. One day, when both brothers were to board a plane, Pusha T was unusually late, and Malice worried that he had been arrested; although Pusha T eventually boarded, it was the final straw for Malice, who angrily declared to his brother in front of the other passengers that he was done with the duo.

Although the breakup wasn't made public at the time, rumors that the duo was over began when Malice (then named Malicious) changed his stage name to No Malice, converted to Christianity, and started making Christian rap, (Note: Malice has pushed back on the terms "Christian rap" and "Christian hip-hop" being used to describe his music, stating: "To me, it's no different than the music I was putting out. It still sounds very real, street hip-hop. It's just minus the ignorance. I hate when someone tries to label me as Christian hip-hop or positive music. I think that's crazy because the music is very hard." Nevertheless, the terms have been used by various magazines and blogs, including HotNewHipHop, Maclean's, and Uproxx.) as opposed to the "coke rap" of Clipse. In 2014, he firmly denied the possibility of a reunion. His attitude had softened by 2016: "I'ma tell you that I learned to never say never, and I don't shut the door on anything. I really don't. In fact, I would like to see Clipse do it. But I just do things differently."

The duo appeared together (credited as Clipse) on "Use This Gospel" by Kanye West, from his Christian hip-hop and gospel album Jesus Is King (2019), having also worked on a demo version of "Follow God". Speaking on the reunion, Pusha T said: "I'm the younger brother, man. I mean, I'm happier than—I can't even express it!" A live performance of "Use This Gospel" with West and Sunday Service Choir came a few days later, ushering in a new era of Clipse live performances at music festivals and award shows. They appeared again on "Punch Bowl" by Nigo, from his album I Know Nigo! (2022). No Malice made a guest appearance (credited as Malice) on "I Pray for You" by Pusha T, from his fourth album, It's Almost Dry (2022).

"Chains & Whips", the first song with Clipse as the primary artist since the reunion, was previewed on June 20, 2023. When asked about a potential new album in a live interview on November 16, 2023, Malice responded "Not at this time" with a smile. An upcoming album was confirmed in a story for magazine Greatest, published December 1, 2023.

=== Pusha T's feud with Jim Jones ===
Rapper Jim Jones made headlines in 2023 for questioning Pusha T's placement in a top fifty rappers of all-time list on the RapCaviar podcast. He repeated his stance during an interview on radio show The Breakfast Club. Pusha T's verse on "Chains & Whips", the first song from Let God Sort Em Out teased at a Louis Vuitton fashion show in 2023, was reported as a response to Jones; in the lyrics, Pusha T accused Jones of jealousy and implied that his comments were made to cosy up to Drake, Pusha T's rival who had brought Jones out as a guest at a concert shortly before the RapCaviar interview. Jones reignited the feud after the release of the lead single "Ace Trumpets" in 2025: "I don't believe it, I don't believe them." When asked about the feud in June 2025, Pusha T responded: "I personally never understood what the interviews were about [...] or why my name kept coming up. It's one thing to keep saying I'm not a top fifty MC, but it's another thing for you not to say that you [yourself] are one. No one asked me about a top fifty nothing. After about the third interview, I promise you, I said, 'Man, he must really want me to know what he thinks about me.' And that's how [my] verse came. This is what I really think about him. This is what I really think about him. Every line is my true heart."

=== Pusha T's solo career and work relationship with GOOD Music ===
Before releasing any solo material, Pusha T signed in the autumn of 2010 to GOOD Music, a record label founded by West. That year, he appeared on multiple songs in West's GOOD Fridays series, rapped in the GOOD cypher at the BET Hip Hop Awards, and had two features on West's album My Beautiful Dark Twisted Fantasy. The creative partnership was fruitful; Pusha T became president of GOOD in 2015, and West had production credits on all of his commercially released albums until It's Almost Dry.

Pusha T was publicly outspoken about not seeing eye-to-eye with West on politics and career moves multiple times. Among other examples, he expressed disagreement over West's support of Donald Trump and claimed to have different principles on music industry relationships. The relationship had completely deteriorated by late 2022, after West made statements widely condemned as antisemitic. Pusha T said the following in response to West's comments: "It's definitely affected me. It's been disappointing. As a Black man in America, there is no room for bigotry or hate speech. So yeah. It's been very disappointing, let's talk straight." In another interview, he said: "It's beyond [wild stuff] and it's nothing to tap dance around. It's wrong. Period." and "He's not speaking to me now. If you ain't with it, you ain't down. And I ain't with it. I'm not budging on that. I'm not with it." He also clarified that he was no longer the president of GOOD or affiliated with the label in any way. Things escalated in March 2025 when Ye expressed that he disliked Pusha T commenting on his political views, and then again in April when he targeted Pusha T in a livestreamed rant: "Pusha T, all that tough guy shit. Where the tough guy shit?" Pusha T responded on Let God Sort Em Out's lead single "Ace Trumpets", mentioning West and seemingly rapping that his comments were merely amusing. West responded, admitting that he missed the friendship. Pusha T would go on to claim in interviews that he does not think West is a real man and stating: "Outside of music, we're nothing. Outside of that, his principles, his morals, his mind-set—we don't see eye-to-eye hardly ever and we never have."

Pusha T took aim at rapper and GOOD Music in-house producer Travis Scott in the lyrics of promotional single "So Be It". The animosity stems primarily from 2023, when Clipse and Williams were working on Let God Sort Em Out in Paris. Travis Scott traveled to the studio to play them his upcoming album Utopia (2023). Missing from this album-listening session was Drake's finalized guest verse on the track "Meltdown", in which he makes a reference to buying Williams's jewelry and melting it down. Pusha T recalled the moment: "He sees me [and Malice] there. He's like, 'Oh, man, everybody's here,' he's smiling, laughing, jumping around, doing his fucking monkey dance. We weren't into the music, but he wanted to play it, wanted to film [us and Williams listening to it]. And then a week later you hear 'Meltdown,' which he didn’t play. He played the song, but not [Drake's verse]." He also added that he felt Scott has a history of unloyal behavior, calling him a "whore" and later "shameless" in another interview.

=== Record label signings and dispute over Kendrick Lamar's lyrics ===
Sometime after deciding to return, Clipse signed to Def Jam Recordings, which had already been Pusha T's label as a solo artist from when GOOD Music was a Def Jam imprint. Let God Sort Em Out was delayed significantly from a planned 2024 release when Def Jam and its parent company Universal Music Group wanted a guest verse by Kendrick Lamar to be censored or removed, initially reported to be because both he and Pusha T have had feuds with Drake, leading to the exchanging of diss tracks in 2018 and 2024, respectively; Universal were said to be uncomfortable with the "optics" of the situation, and Drake's feud with Lamar would eventually result in a lawsuit by Drake against them. It was later clarified that the official reason was use of the phrase "Trump card" in the lyrics and concerns of conflict with United States President Donald Trump, although Pusha T personally believed that this was merely an excuse, as he claimed to have been censored by Def Jam numerous times since 2018 over lyrics that could be perceived as Drake disses.

The signing wasn't announced until October 2024. Journalist Elias Leight wrote that the duo was already signed as of "early" 2024. Music industry executive Brian Zisook publicly claimed that Clipse was already under Def Jam c. June 2023. (Note: Zisook uses the March 2024 song "Like That" by Future, Metro Boomin, and Lamar as a reference point.) Clipse refused to censor or remove the verse. The stalemate ended when a seven-figure sum was paid for him and the duo to be released from Def Jam before signing a distribution deal with Roc Nation instead, although Def Jam will receive a portion of the album's revenue. The distribution deal, spearheaded by Jay-Z, was finalized less than a full day after Clipse left Def Jam. The latter signing was informally announced in May 2025 when a picture of the duo in front of the Roc Nation insignia, captioned with the album title, was posted to Instagram jointly by the duo and Roc Nation itself.

=== Recording sessions ===
The album's recording sessions started in 2023; these sessions were split between Virginia, United States and the Louis Vuitton headquarters in Paris, France. As told by Andre Gee for Rolling Stone, the first makings of the album were after the 2023 Grammys, when Pusha T flew to Miami to work with Williams and Malice, ultimately choosing five beats. However, Gee's article goes on to use phrasing that implies nothing recorded in Miami made the album—"[Malice] prayed with his engineer before every recording session in Virginia. (Other sessions took place in Paris with Williams.)"—and no other source mentions Miami. Frazier Tharpe of GQ specifies that a majority of the album was recorded in Paris. The album was confirmed to be finished in December 2024. Some lyrics in "Ace Trumpets" were interpreted to be in response to rants by West in March and April 2025.

== Promotion ==
=== Singles and music videos ===
Let God Sort Em Out's lead single "Ace Trumpets" was released on May 30, 2025. The song garnered media attention for lyrics that reference Pusha T's former boss and long-standing creative partner West, interpreted by some as being dismissive of West's public outbursts. "Ace Trumpets", with its "icy drums, lush synths, and unsettling elegance", received positive reviews from music critics. Alex Hudson of Exclaim! commented: "The beat certainly isn't Pharrell's hookiest, but the thundering 808 bludgeons with pure muscle. Hell yeah—welcome back, guys." Tom Breihan of Stereogum wrote: "Pusha and Malice both sound cold and imperious. Malice's verse is a real masterclass." Dash Lewis of Pitchfork called the song "a menacing return to form for the coke rap auteurs. Pharrell Williams' beat, with its rimshot snare, chest-caving bass, and synth drone that sounds like a screwed-down tornado siren, conveys the same creeping tension he supplied Pusha with for 2022's It's Almost Dry." A lyric video was released on June 4.

Described by publications as the second single, promotional single "So Be It" was released exclusively as a black-and-white Hannan Hussain-directed music video via YouTube and Instagram on June 17, depicting Clipse in a mansion with various classic luxury cars on the property. Some fans and journalists mistakenly thought the song was a diss toward West based on previewed lyrics. "So Be It" was well received by critics. Zachary Horvath of HotNewHipHop wrote that "potential dissing aside, the music is great on its own. Pharrell remains in tip-top shape here, with a head-bopping beat and a haunting sample to kick off the track. The verses from the Clipse stars are also sharp again and this is shaping up to be the rap AOTY." Preezy Brown of Vibe called the song a "triumphant return to form—sharp, stylish, and unapologetically elite", commenting that Pusha T "sounds as focused as ever" and Malice "delivers with cryptic flair". Brown also remarked: "Pharrell's production is masterful—strings and Arabian flourishes swirl into a backdrop that feels celebratory and menacing all at once."

On July 10, Clipse released two more songs from the album exclusively on Apple Music in the hours leading up to the full release: firstly "Chains & Whips", and then "So Far Ahead".

=== Brand collaborations ===
American fashion brand Denim Tears would be the first brand to collaborate with Clipse, unveiling a Let God Sort Em Out-branded T-shirt in June 2024, a whole year before the album's eventual release; this was in celebration of the brand's fifth anniversary.

Further brand collaborations remained unknown until the release of "So Be It" on June 18, 2025, where Clipse would unveil an alternate album package and merchandise line, designed by Japanese artist Verdy. Williams's Billionaire Boys Club line would announce an exclusive black T-shirt on June 21. The company made the T-shirt available at their flagship stores from that date forward, with the shirt releasing online on July 11. Pusha T would begin teasing Clipse-branded Adidas Samba shoes on July 7; they were given an early-access release on July 14. A Carhartt collaboration was announced the following day; it was released alongside the album on July 11, featuring jackets, graphic T-shirts, a hoodie and sweatshirt. Another alternate album package, designed by American artist Josh Sperling, was announced on July 15.

==== Louis Vuitton fashion shows ====
Williams was hand-selected to be the new creative director of menswear at luxury fashion house Louis Vuitton in 2023. In a story with the New York Times about the job and his upcoming debut fashion show with the brand, an unheard song with Pusha T ("Chains & Whips") was teased, although it was not yet revealed as a Clipse song. The three annual spring–summer shows from this point until Let God Sort Em Out's release all featured new Clipse music in their soundtracks, along with other songs. "Chains & Whips" was debuted at the Louis Vuitton's Men's Spring–Summer Show 2024 on June 20, 2023, although Kendrick Lamar's guest verse was not yet included. Pusha T and Malice also walked on the runway in Williams's designs. For the Men's Spring–Summer Show 2025 on June 18, 2024, "The Birds Don't Sing" was previewed for the first time, featuring vocals by John Legend. The Men's Spring–Summer Show 2026 debuted "So Be It Pt. II" on June 24, 2025.

==== All Day I Dream About Sport ====
A short film titled All Day I Dream About Sport, co-created by Williams and Gabriel Moses, was premiered at the High Museum of Art on February 15, 2025, in an event hosted by German sportswear brand Adidas. Although not explicitly tied to Clipse, the film's soundtrack included a preview of an original Pusha T song produced by Williams titled "Mike Tyson Blow to the Face". The song was later confirmed for Let God Sort Em Out, being referred to under the shortened name "Mike Tyson".

=== Teaser tracks on social media ===
A video of Williams dancing to a song from the album was posted to Instagram by Gabriel Moses in August 2024.

Pusha T posted a video to his Instagram account on May 7, 2025, captioned with the song title "So Far Ahead". The video, serving as a trailer for the song, featured footage of him getting ready for the 2025 edition of the Met Gala, spliced with images of figures like slave William Lee, boxer and activist Muhammad Ali, and artist Jean-Michel Basquiat.

"So Be It" was previewed on Instagram Live by DJ Hed, and on radio station Hot 97 by disc jockey Funkmaster Flex, both on June 16, a day before the song's official release as a music video.

Athlete LeBron James took to Instagram on June 23 to preview Nas' guest verse on "Let God Sort Em Out / Chandeliers."

=== Interviews and promotional press ===
"[This album is] a whole new chapter. This is new, it's groundbreaking, it's fresh. This isn't a reminisce runway. Everything is new—the music, the energy, the competitive spirit. It's all about what's next and being what's next."

— Pusha T, in a May 2025 solo interview with GQ.

Vulture published an interview with Clipse in which an album was explicitly confirmed, on June 19, 2024—one day after "The Birds Don't Sing" was previewed at the Louis Vuitton's Men's Spring–Summer Show 2025. Interviewed by Craig Jenkins, the duo reflected on the passing of their parents and how that experience, along with Williams's father dealing with dialysis treatments, influenced the lyrics of "The Birds Don't Sing". Pusha T revealed that Malice came up with the title, inspired by writer and activist Maya Angelou's 1969 autobiography I Know Why the Caged Bird Sings. Other topics included the brothers' father giving Malice his blessing to return to Clipse, the "coke rap" label often assigned to them, and Pusha T being referenced by Kendrick Lamar in his 2024 rap battle with Drake. Additionally, a comeback album was officially announced for the first time, although no title or release date was given. Pusha T stated: "The next year is going to be filled with appearances, touring, and a rap album of the year."

Clipse spoke to Njera Perkins of People in an interview published on August 15, 2024. They talked about their then-upcoming performance at the Pepsi Dig In Day Block Party charity event, they joys of performing live in general, and how Williams had been pushing for a reunion. Malice commented: "[Pharrell]'s definitely been pushing for it and we always knew in the back of our heads it was always a possibility [...] So when things just started to take shape, and the timing was right, I think it just came [together] just as it should."

Andre Gee interviewed the duo for a story in Rolling Stone, published September 4. Malice recounted the story of how he quit Clipse, adding that a health scare at the time about the false belief that he had HIV/AIDS exacerbated his stress and inability to continue with the duo. He also elaborated on what his Christian faith means to him and why he changed his stage name back from No Malice: "When I changed my name to No Malice, I was making a statement [...] There were things that needed to be said, lessons that needed to be learned. And I know exactly who I am. I have been cut to the heart. I am a new creation. I see things different, and I am able to assume any name I choose for myself." Various details about the album were included—that Nas had a guest appearance on the album, that the album's conception point followed the 2023 Grammys, and that "The Birds Don't Sing" was the album's opening track. Gee wrote that the album was due for later that year.

Pusha T sat down for a solo interview with journalist Ari Melber on December 7 for an event by media company Saint & Citizen. Pusha T talked about the Drake–Kendrick Lamar feud, declaring Drake the loser of the battle and mocking Drake's pre-lawsuit legal actions against Universal Music Group. He also promised that Let God Sort Em Out was finished.

A story with Frazier Tharpe for GQ, published on June 2, 2025, started by stating that Clipse were unimpressed with the current state of mainstream hip-hop. The brothers gave Stove God Cooks and Future as exceptions. Pusha T lamented the feelings of loneliness and need to play "industry games" that came with his solo career, revealed that he was already becoming disillusioned with his former boss West during the 2019 recording sessions for Jesus Is King, and criticized West for his perceived character flaws. He also denied being a bad friend to West. The story of Clipse's dispute with Def Jam Recordings was told for the first time in this interview. Also included were comments about Drake suing Universal Music Group ("The suing thing is bigger than some rap shit. I just don't rate you.") and more details about the album: tracks "Mike Tyson", "POV", "F.I.C.O.", and features from Stove God Cooks and Lamar. After the release of "So Be It", GQ published a follow-up article (with unused excerpts from the interview) in which the song was discussed, including lyrics from Pusha T which diss Travis Scott.

Another interview with Andre Gee for Rolling Stone was published on June 9. Clipse elaborated on their distribution deal with Roc Nation and announced a nationwide United States tour, planned to take place across twenty-five shows from August 3 to September 10. No new information about the album was included, but the duo gave additional thoughts on Def Jam, Lamar's verse, and hopes for the tour, along with discussion of Pusha T's activities in the fashion industry: his role as a Louis Vuitton brand ambassador, walking on the runway for Williams's show, and his appearance at the Met Gala.

Clipse appeared on the New York Times' podcast Popcast on June 24. Speaking to Joe Coscarelli and Jon Caramanica, the duo went over various aspects of their history—the making of their mixtape series, Malice's reasons for quitting, the moment they realized their music was reaching a wide audience, and more, in addition to the impact of becoming parents (and, in Malice's case, a grandparent) on their music and the minor detail that "Chains & Whips" would be the second track. Pusha T explained the change in behavior from Def Jam representatives after hearing Lamar's verse and revealed the official reason they were given for the demand that the verse be removed; his issues with Drake, West, and Travis Scott were also explored. They hosted a Ask Me Anything session on the subreddit r/hiphopheads on July 15.

=== Tour ===
Clipse announced a United States concert tour in promotion of the album on June 9, consisting of twenty-five planned shows from August 3 to September 10. Atlanta hip-hop duo EarthGang is the planned supporting act. Four dates in Europe were added on July 14, extending the tour's window to November 10.

=== Other live performances ===
Clipse performed at the DuSable Black History Museum in Chicago, Illinois on August 24, 2024, for the Pepsi Dig In Day Block Party—a free event celebrating Black-owned restaurants.

Clipse performed "Ace Trumpets" on June 26, 2025, for A Colors Show—a live performance series by German media company ColorsxStudios. Audio of the performance was released as a single on streaming services the same day. They performed an NPR Tiny Desk concert on July 11, concurrently with the album's release. A few days later, on July 15, they performed "The Birds Don't Sing" on The Tonight Show Starring Jimmy Fallon.

During 2025 Jubilee, the "World Meeting on Human Fraternity 2025" took place on the St. Peter's Square at the Vatican City on 12 and 13 September, with concert of Andrea Bocelli, Pharrell Williams with the gospel choir Voices of Fire, and John Legend. Clipse performed the song "The Birds Don't Sing" along with John Legend at the second date during the Grace For The World concert on September 13, making history for being the first rappers to ever perform at the Vatican City. The duo performed "So Be It" on Jimmy Kimmel Live! in October 2025.

=== Other events ===
A listening party for the album was held on the rooftop of the Louis Vuitton headquarters in Paris, France on June 23, 2025. Recordings of Lamar's verse on "Chains & Whips" subsequently circulated on social media.

At approximately 11 p.m. Eastern Time on July 10, disc jockey and radio personality Ebro Darden hosted a live listening party of the album through Apple Music.

An album-signing event was hosted on July 17, 2025, exclusively for customers who purchased a Let God Sort Em Out vinyl via Amoeba Music's Hollywood store.

=== Clipse Week with Genius ===
Clipse collaborated with lyrics website and media company Genius for a series named Clipse Week. It began with a Genius Verified video for "Chains & Whips" on July 11, 2025. Verified is a series in which artists explain their songs' lyrical meaning and inspiration. Malice spoke about his faith, his time away from Clipse, and what made him return; he also commented on the perception that Pusha T is too outspoken about industry peers, arguing that his brother's statements are actually mild: "I truly admire his restraint. People think he goes over the top and just with me knowing where all the bodies are buried, I admire his restraint." Pusha T revealed that the chorus was started by Williams when the duo was stuck during the writing process. On the same day, Malice wrote official annotations for each track on Let God Sort Em Out through his verified Genius account. A Genius Verified video for "Ace Trumpets" was released on July 14.

== Artwork ==
Alternate album covers were designed by Verdy (left) and Josh Sperling (right)

The cover artwork for the album was designed by American artist Kaws, featuring his Companion character being assembled, or "sorted out", by two hands. Kaws has been a known collaborator with Clipse, having also designed the cover art for their 2009 album Til the Casket Drops. American artist Josh Sperling described his two alternate album covers as "The Cross and the Anchor. The Cross to represent sin, death and faith. The Anchor to represent strength and stability in unknown waters. Two symbols for Two brothers."

== Critical reception ==
Professional ratings
Aggregate scores
Source	Rating
AnyDecentMusic?	7.5/10
Metacritic	83/100
Review scores
Source	Rating
AllMusic	4/5 stars
Clash	9/10
Consequence	A−
Exclaim!	7/10
The Guardian	5/5 stars
HotNewHipHop	(Note: HotNewHipHop's rating system does not follow traditional publications, instead opting for a scale of "Make It Stop" (or) through "Very Hottttt" (or).)
NME	3/5 stars
Pitchfork	6.5/10
Rolling Stone	4/5 stars
Slant Magazine	2.5/5 stars

Upon release, the album was met with widespread acclaim from critics. According to the review aggregator Metacritic, Let God Sort Em Out received "universal acclaim" based on a weighted average score of 83 out of 100 from eleven critic scores.

Alexis Petridis of The Guardian gave the album a perfect score and called it "as strong a restatement of Clipse's skills and power as you could wish for". The lyrical versatility was praised ("Great lines abound, from the chilling to the laugh-out-loud"), as were the duo's chemistry; the guest appearances, which were said to have "step[ped] up" without stealing the show; and the "inspired" production. He concluded by declaring it one of the best albums of the year. Tom Breihan of Stereogum shared similar sentiments when reviewing the album for the publication's Premature Evaluation column, commenting on its "minimal, stabbing intensity" that he likened to Clipse's second album, Hell Hath No Fury (2006). Lyrically, he also praised the duo's chemistry with the featured guests—Stove God Cooks and Ab-Liva in particular—and Malice's presence, which "still has the gravitational force of a black hole".

Niall Smith of Clash gave the album a nine out of ten and described the lyrics as a balance between the duo's old style and introspection on "maturity, perspective[,] and loss". Smith felt that the album's most impressive aspect was the guest appearances; although he felt some of Williams's choruses were "shakier moments", they were mostly redeemed by Clipse's "synergy". Kiana Fitzgerald of Consequence also praised the album's guest performances and lyrical versatility ("The brothers are as contemplative as they are comedic") and complimented the production, highlighting "M.T.B.T.T.F."'s specifically as evoking the golden era of hip-hop.

Simon Vozick-Levinson of Rolling Stone gave the album four stars out of five, praising Clipse's "fascinating" emotional growth, but noting that it at times felt like a Pusha T solo album rather than a Clipse album. In an unrated positive review for Variety, Peter A. Berry praised the duo's chemistry, but criticized Williams's contributions, describing the album's production as "somewhat unimaginative" and his choruses on "So Far Ahead" and "By the Grace of God" as "ham-fisted tropes".

Jordan Darville of The Fader called the album a "daring move" and a "solid, occasionally brilliant project" with an emotional core around Malice's Christian faith, praising the "grand" instrumentals and Clipse's more introspective lyrics than previous releases, while feeling that the features were more of a mixed bag, specifically criticizing "All Things Considered" for Williams and The-Dream's contributions.

Marko Djurdjić of Exclaim! gave the "hostile, paranoid, and often inspiring album" a seven out of ten, praising the overall style of the rapping ("This is fucking rapping, and it is relentless.") and the "beyond impressive" writing while criticizing the flows as repetitive and describing the production on some tracks as "tedious [and] unnecessary". In a more lukewarm review, Kyann-Sian Williams of NME gave the album three stars out of five, complimenting the "raw", introspective lyricism and guest appearances but criticizing Malice's appearances as being preachy and the production as being less innovative then Clipse's previous releases.

Alphonse Pierre of Pitchfork also gave a lukewarm review. Scoring the album 6.5 out of ten, Pierre wrote that the duo are "still pretty nice with it on the mic" but deemed Williams's production to be "holding back" the album and boring, describing it as "corporate", "stuffy", and "HR-approved". He cited "M.T.B.T.T.F" as a highlight. Paul Attard of Slant Magazine had similar criticisms, feeling that it was "less like an album and more like a business brief"; he described the production as "devoid of friction" and criticized Clipse's lyricism as being untargeted.

Additionally, the album also received 5 nominations at the 2026 Grammy Awards, including nominations for Album of the Year and Best Rap Album.

=== Accolades ===
Publication	Accolade	Rank	Ref.
Billboard	The 50 Best Albums of 2025	4	
Complex	The 50 Best Albums of 2025	3	
Complex	The 35 Best Hip-Hop Albums of 2025	2	
Consequence	The 25 Best Rap Albums of 2025	1	
The Fader	The 50 Best Albums of 2025	10	
Hip Hop Golden Age	The Best Hip Hop Albums of 2025	3	
Rolling Stone	The 100 Best Albums of 2025	6	
Rolling Stone	The 25 Best Hip-Hop Albums of 2025	1	

== Commercial performance ==
In the United States, the album debuted at #4 on the Billboard 200 chart behind Travis Scott's JackBoys 2 and Justin Bieber's Swag with 118,000 album-equivalent units, matching the debut of Lord Willin' (2002) and simultaneously marking the duo's second ever top-10 album. Of those 118,000 album-equivalent units, 58,000 were pure album sales and 59,000 were from streaming services, marking Clipse's biggest streaming week ever with 77.49 million on-demand streams of the album's tracks. Elsewhere, the album debuted at #1 on the Billboard Independent Albums chart, and charted top-10 placements in Switzerland and Canada.

== Track listing ==
All tracks are written by Gene Thornton, Terrence Thornton, and Pharrell Williams. Additional writers are noted. All tracks are produced by Williams.

Let God Sort Em Out track listing
No.	Title	Writer(s)	Length
1.	"The Birds Don't Sing" (featuring John Legend and Voices of Fire)	Stevie Wonder	4:00
2.	"Chains & Whips" (with Kendrick Lamar)	Kendrick Duckworth	4:03
3.	"P.O.V." (featuring Tyler, the Creator)	Tyler Okonma	4:18
4.	"So Be It"		3:14
5.	"Ace Trumpets"		2:34
6.	"All Things Considered" (featuring The-Dream and Pharrell Williams)	Terius Gesteelde-Diamant	3:09
7.	"M.T.B.T.T.F."		2:36
8.	"E.B.I.T.D.A." (featuring Pharrell Williams)		1:59
9.	"F.I.C.O." (featuring Stove God Cooks)	Aaron Cook	3:21
10.	"Inglorious Bastards" (featuring Ab-Liva)	Rennard East	2:33
11.	"So Far Ahead" (featuring Pharrell Williams)		3:22
12.	"Let God Sort Em Out / Chandeliers" (featuring Nas)	Nasir Jones	2:32
13.	"By the Grace of God" (featuring Pharrell Williams)		3:06
Total length:			40:47

=== Notes ===
- "Inglorious Bastards" features uncredited vocals from DJ Clue.
- "M.T.B.T.T.F." stands for "Mike Tyson Blow to the Face".
- Due to sample clearance issues with "So Be It", a "Pt. II" remix with a different instrumental was uploaded onto streaming platforms in its place upon the album's release. A few hours later, the issue would be resolved, with the original track being reinstated. (Note: In a conversation with Brian Zisook, Clipse's manager Steven Victor revealed that American record producer Swizz Beatz had contacted him on the album's release day regarding "So Be It". After learning about the clearance issue, Swizz, who was in Saudi Arabia at the time, personally spoke with the copyright holders of "Maza Akoolou" and got the sample cleared.)
- The initial Kaws and Verdy physical versions of the album did not include either version of "So Be It" or Tyler, the Creator's appearance on "P.O.V.".

=== Sample credits ===
- "Chains & Whips" contains a sample of "Take Five", composed by Paul Desmond, as performed by Cherry Wainer and Don Storer.
- "P.O.V." contains an interpolation of the Streets of San Francisco theme tune, composed by Patrick Williams.
- "So Be It" contains a sample of "Maza Akoolou", written by Fata El Shatea and Mohammed Abdel Wahab, and performed by Talal Maddah.
- "Inglorious Bastards" contains a sample of Jesse Jackson's opening speech to Wattstax.
- "Let God Sort Em Out / Chandeliers" contains a sample of the Sarge theme tune, composed by David Shire.

== Personnel ==
Credits adapted from the official album credits, Apple Music and Tidal.

=== Main vocals ===
- Clipse:
  - Malice – vocals
  - Pusha T – vocals
- John Legend – vocals (1)
- Kendrick Lamar – vocals (2)
- Tyler, the Creator – vocals (3)
- Pharrell Williams – vocals (6, 8, 11, 13)
- The-Dream – vocals (6)
- Stove God Cooks – vocals (9)
- Ab-Liva – vocals (10)
- Nas – vocals (12)

=== Additional vocals ===
- Stevie Wonder – spoken word (1)
- Pharrell Williams – additional vocals (2)
- Aboud Harb – additional vocals (4)
- Nigel Brixx Thornton – additional vocals (6)
- Susan Carol Lewis – additional vocals (11)
- Voices of Fire – choir (1, 3, 8, 11, 13)
  - Larry George – tenor
  - Alrenzo Albritton – tenor
  - Jahzeel Mumford – tenor
  - Lauren Hendrick – soprano
  - Megan Buhmann – soprano
  - T. Alexandria Gray – soprano
  - Jazmine Canales – alto
  - Trenise Holloman – alto
  - Maria Rosado – alto
  - Colette Williams – alto

=== Instruments ===
- Mike Larson – additional programming (1–6, 8–13)
- Replay Heaven:
  - Richard Adlam – programming, keyboards (3–4)
  - Hal Ritson – programming, keyboards (3–4), violin (4)
- Ali Jamieson – programming, keyboards (4)
- Brandon Harding – programming (6)
- Stevie Wonder – piano (1)
- Larry Gold – string orchestra (1)
- Steve Tirpak – string orchestra (1)
- Emma Kummrow – violin (1)
- Charlene Kwas – violin (1)
- Natasha Colkett – violin (1)
- Blake Espy – violin (1)
- Gared Crawford – violin (1)
- Ghislaine Fleischmann – violin (1)
- Marianne Haynes – violin (4)
- Jonathan Kim – viola (1)
- Yoshihiko Nakano – viola (1)
- Glenn Fischbach – cello (1)
- Vivian Barton Dozor – cello (1)
- Lenny Kravitz – electric guitar (2)
- J. Drew Sheard II – keyboards (13)

=== Directorial ===
- Larry Gold – orchestra conductor (1)
- Bishop Ezekiel Williams – choir director (1, 3, 8, 11, 13)
- Larry George – choir director (1, 3, 8, 11, 13)

=== Technical ===
- Pharrell Williams – mixing engineer
- Manny Marroquin – mixing engineer, immersive mixing engineer
- Kevin Madigan – immersive mixing engineer
- Mike Larson – recording engineer (1–4, 6–13), mixing engineer, arrangement
- Rob Ulsh – recording engineer
- Jeff Chestek – recording engineer (1)
- Tim McClain – recording engineer (1)
- Cristian F. Perez – recording engineer (1)
- Alex Alvarez – recording engineer (2)
- Ray Charles Brown Jr. – recording engineer (2)
- Benjamin Thomas – recording engineer (4, 11)
- Hart Gunther – recording engineer (6)
- Brandon Harding – recording engineer (6)
- Nathaniel Alford – recording engineer (7)
- Susan Carol Lewis – recording engineer (11)
- Mark "Exit" Goodchild – recording engineer (12)
- Jim Parroco – 2nd engineer (1, 3, 8, 11, 13) (Note: Per official credits. Parroco is listed as an assistant engineer on Apple Music.)
- Lou Carrao – 2nd engineer (10)
- Trey Station – assistant mixing engineer
- Anthony J. Vilchis – assistant mixing engineer
- Ramiro Fernandez-Seoane – assistant mixing engineer (7)
- Zach Pereyra – mastering engineer

=== "So Be It Pt. II" ===
Credits archived from Apple Music.

- Malice – vocals
- Pusha T – vocals
- Mike Larson – programming
- Richard Adlam – programming, keyboards
- Ali Jamieson – programming, keyboards
- Hal Ritson – programming, keyboards
- Replay Heaven – programming, keyboards
- Voices of Fire – choir
  - Bishop Ezekiel Williams – choir director, piano
  - Larry George – choir director, tenor
  - Megan Bugmann – soprano
  - Lauren Hendrick – soprano
  - Twylia Jackson – soprano
  - Gloria Johnson – soprano
  - Taelor McClenny – soprano
  - Yunassea Thomas – soprano
  - Kamron Blue – bass
  - Melvette Armond – alto
  - Jazmine Canales – alto
  - Michon David – alto
  - Megan Heinsman – alto
  - Trenise Holloman – alto
  - Nakia Madry-Smith – alto
  - Kristin Nettles – alto
  - Maria Rosado – alto
  - Colette Williams – alto
  - Alrenzo Albritton – tenor
  - Jordan Felisbret – tenor
  - Sherrie Wayne – tenor
  - Jahzeel Mumford – tenor
- Thomas Roussel – orchestra conductor
- Cyprien Brod – violin
- Aurore Moutomé – violin
- Céline Munch – violin
- Miléna Julien – violin
- Florian Jourdan – violin
- Florestan Raës – violin
- Clara Bourdeix – violin
- Cecile Bourcier – violin
- Koah Vu Nguyen – violin
- Mehdi Bourai – violin
- Mario Guierre – violin
- Laure Simonin – violin
- Robin Antunes – violin
- Hugo Van Rechem – violin
- Emmanuelle Jakubek – violin
- Anna Pecic – violin
- Glen Rouxel – violin
- Éléonore Grimbert-Barré – violin
- Nina Tonji – viola
- Julien Gaben – viola
- Sarah Niblack – viola
- Camille Coello – viola
- Carla Fratini – viola
- Pauline Gmyr – viola
- Clara Germont – cello
- Alexis Derouin – cello
- Lucien Debon – cello
- Emmanuelle Schneider – cello
- Augustin Guénand – cello
- Florence Hennequin – cello
- Sapho Wanty – bass
- Fabien Coquant – bass
- Claire-Elie Tenet – bass
- Margot Mayette – flute
- Maholy Guéroult – flute
- Miglė Astrauskaitė-Costard – piccolo flute
- Alix Vaillant – oboe
- Angela Rinaldi – oboe
- François Tissot – clarient
- Avril Muller – clarient
- Eliott Berdugo – bass clarient
- Lili Cousinié – French horn
- Hugo Pons – French horn
- Pierre-Alexis Torres-Toulemont – French horn
- Constance Mespoulet – French horn
- Jérôme Lacquet – trumpet
- Manon Delahaye – trumpet
- Sarah Maletras – trumpet
- Thibault Mortegoute – trombone
- Mahel Gheribi – trombone
- Lucas Spiler – bass trombone
- Adrian Salloum – timpani
- Wally Loume – percussion
- Matteo Sausse – percussion
- Timothée Gesland – percussion
- François Vallet – percussion
- Odile Foulliaron – harp
- Pharrell Williams – mixing engineer
- Manny Marroquin – mixing engineer, immersive mixing engineer
- Kevin Madigan – immersive mixing engineer
- Mike Larson – recording engineer, mixing engineer
- Gaspard Murphy – recording engineer, mixing engineer
- Sylvain Denis – recording engineer, mixing engineer
- Rob Ulsh – recording engineer
- Benjamin Thomas – recording engineer
- Trey Station – assistant engineer
- Anthony J. Vilchis – assistant engineer
- Ramiro Fernandez-Seoane – assistant engineer
- Aurélien Thoumire – assistant engineer
- Nicolas Servant – assistant engineer
- Tristan Chiffoleau – assistant engineer
- Eliaz Buridant – assistant engineer
- Hannah Kessas – assistant engineer
- Lucas Desplaces – assistant engineer
- Timothée Franque – assistant engineer
- Zach Pereyra – mastering engineer

== Charts ==
=== Weekly charts ===
Weekly chart performance for Let God Sort Em Out
Chart (2025)	Peak position
Australian Albums (ARIA)	79
Austrian Albums (Ö3 Austria)	41
Belgian Albums (Ultratop Flanders)	37
Belgian Albums (Ultratop Wallonia)	124
Canadian Albums (Billboard)	6
Danish Albums (Hitlisten)	25
Dutch Albums (Album Top 100)	15
Icelandic Albums (Tónlistinn)	23
Irish Albums (Official Charts)	34
Lithuanian Albums (AGATA)	50
New Zealand Albums (RMNZ)	14
Nigerian Albums (TurnTable)	71
Norwegian Albums (VG-lista)	33
Portuguese Albums (AFP)	20
Spanish Albums (Promusicae)	94
Swiss Albums (Schweizer Hitparade)	7
UK Albums (Official Charts)	16
UK Independent Albums (Official Charts)	14
UK R&B Albums (Official Charts)	3
US Billboard 200	4
US Independent Albums (Billboard)	1
US Top R&B/Hip-Hop Albums (Billboard)	3

=== Year-end charts ===
Year-end chart performance for Let God Sort Em Out
Chart (2025)	Position
US Billboard 200	192
US Top R&B/Hip-Hop Albums (Billboard)	57

== See also ==
- 2025 in American music
- 2025 in hip-hop
