= Fico (surname) =

Fico is a surname. Notable people with the name include:

- Delina Fico, Albanian civil society activist
- Enrica Antonioni (born 1952), née Fico, Italian film director and actress, widow of Michelangelo Antonioni
- Raffaella Fico (born 1988), Italian showgirl, singer and model
- Rauf Fico (1881–1944), Albanian ambassador and politician
- Robert Fico (born 1964), Prime Minister of Slovakia
- Roberto Fico (born 1974), former President of the Italian Chamber of Deputies

== See also ==
- Fico (disambiguation)
