= I Pray for You =

Song by Clipse (Pusha T and Malice) featuring Labrinth

from the album It's Almost Dry
- Released: April 22, 2022
- Recorded: 2020–2022
- Genre: Hip-hop; Gospel rap
- Length: 4:21
- Label: GOOD; Def Jam
- Songwriters: Terrence Thornton; Gene Thornton Jr.; Timothy McKenzie; Kanye West
- Producers: Labrinth; Kanye West

"I Pray for You" is a song by American hip-hop duo Clipse, featuring English musician Labrinth. It appears as the closing track on Pusha T's fourth studio album, It's Almost Dry (2022). The track marked the first official Clipse recording since 2009, credited under the duo's moniker once more.

== Background and release ==
The song was released on April 22, 2022, as part of It's Almost Dry, through GOOD Music and Def Jam Recordings. In digital editions of the album, the track is credited to Clipse featuring Labrinth, signifying the duo's first proper reunion on record since Til the Casket Drops (2009).

== Composition and lyrics ==
"I Pray for You" incorporates gospel-influenced instrumentation, with Labrinth contributing the choral refrain and production. Pusha T’s verse reflects on legacy and perseverance, while Malice delivers an introspective verse centered on spirituality, redemption, and brotherhood. Critics noted that the interplay between the brothers echoed the contrasting perspectives that defined Clipse’s earlier work.

== Reception ==
Although not released as a single, "I Pray for You" was highlighted as a standout track on the album. The New Yorker described it as "a rare moment of introspection, highlighting the personal cost of his former lifestyle." Pitchfork called Malice's guest verse "a moving return" and praised Labrinth's production for giving the track "an otherworldly gravity."

== Personnel ==
Credits adapted from album liner notes.

- Pusha T – vocals, songwriting
- Malice – vocals, songwriting
- Labrinth – vocals, production, songwriting
- Kanye West – executive production, songwriting
- Mike Dean – mixing, mastering
- Manny Marroquin – mixing
