= Ace Trumpets =

Single by Clipse

from the album Let God Sort Em Out
- Released: May 30, 2025
- Genre: Hip-hop
- Length: 2:34
- Label: Roc Nation
- Songwriters: Terrence Thornton; Gene Thornton; Pharrell Williams
- Producer: Pharrell Williams

Clipse singles chronology
"Popular Demand (Popeyes)" (2009)	"Ace Trumpets" (2025)

Music video
- "Ace Trumpets" on YouTube

"Ace Trumpets" is a song by American hip-hop duo Clipse, released on May 30, 2025, as the lead single from their fourth studio album, Let God Sort Em Out (2025). It was produced by Pharrell Williams. On June 26, 2025, Clipse teamed up with ColorsxStudios to release a music video of them performing the song.

== Composition and lyrics ==
The production is composed of a mid-tempo boom bap beat with synths and Spanish guitar. The song opens with a sampled woman's voice saying "This is culturally inappropriate", after which Pusha T performs the chorus, which includes the lyrics "Ballerinas doin' pirouettes inside of my snow globe, shoppin' sprees in SoHo" and a line about strippers. In the first verse, Pusha T details his expensive taste in fashion. He compares himself to Luigi and both Harry Houdini and Whodini co-vocalist John Fletcher, a.k.a. Ecstasy. In regard to drug dealing, before proceeding to mock fellow rapper and former friend Kanye West; Pusha alludes to the shipping delays of Yeezy products, West's recent remarks about Push, and Ye taking offense at the romantic interest discussed in rapper Drake's song "In My Feelings". In the second verse, No Malice makes references with the double-entendre with Nirvana and the band Nirvana ("Drugs killed my teen spirit"), as well as singer Lady Gaga's portrayal of Italian criminal Patrizia Reggiani in the film House of Gucci in a euphemism for selling cocaine. Both Pusha and Malice alter the pronunciation of certain words to make them rhyme.

== Critical reception ==
The song was well-received by music critics. Alex Hudson of Exclaim! commented "The beat certainly isn't Pharrell's hookiest, but the thundering 808 bludgeons with pure muscle. Hell yeah — welcome back, guys." DR of The Fader stated "Pusha T and Malice return in fine form with 'Ace Trumpets,' a bulletproof reminder of the Clipse supremacy. It's been over 15 years since the brothers Thornton released music together but the moment Pusha T raps 'Ballerinas doin' pirouettes inside of my snow globe' over a gauzy, Pharrell-produced beat, it feels like no time at all." Writing for HotNewHipHop, Bryson "Boom" Paul lauded No Malice's performance, describing him as "calm, collective and as meticulous as ever on the track with soon-to-be memorable bars." Paper's Shaad D'Souza wrote "Just like no time passed at all, Clipse are back, produced immaculately by Pharrell Williams. Do I like the line 'Yellow diamonds look like pee pee?' No, of course I don't. But Pusha and Malice are still sharper and more charismatic than most. 'Ace Trumpets' is a welcome harbinger for the duo's new album, due in July." Revolt's Jon Powell wrote "The production flex is classic Neptunes: Icy drums, lush synths and unsettling elegance. It's the kind of soundtrack only the Clipse could rap over with this much conviction." Tom Breihan of Stereogum called the song "nasty" and its beat "an epic boom-bap honk", before remarking "Pusha and Malice both sound cold and imperious. Malice's verse is a real masterclass. He sticks with the same rhyme scheme throughout and announces his return to form".

== Live performances ==
The duo performed the song on June 26, 2025, for A Colors Show—a live performance series by German media company ColorsxStudios. Audio of the performance was released as a single on streaming services the same day.

== Personnel ==
Credits adapted from Apple Music.

- Gene Thornton – vocals
- Terrence Thornton – vocals
- Mike Larson – programming, mixing engineer
- Manny Marroquin – mixing engineer
- Pharrell Williams – mixing engineer
- Zach Pereyra – mastering engineer
- Trey Station – assistant engineer
- Anthony Vilchis – assistant engineer
- Rob Ulsh – engineer

== Charts ==
Chart performance for "Ace Trumpets"
Chart (2025)	Peak position
US Billboard Hot 100	78
US Hot R&B/Hip-Hop Songs (Billboard)	26
