= So Be It (Clipse song) =

2025 promotional single by Clipse

Promotional single by Clipse

from the album Let God Sort Em Out
- Released: June 17, 2025
- Genre: Hip-hop
- Length: 3:14
- Label: Roc Nation
- Songwriters: Gene Thornton; Terrence Thornton; Pharrell Williams
- Producer: Pharrell Williams

Music video
- "So Be It" on YouTube

"So Be It Pt. II"

Song by Clipse

from the album Let God Sort Em Out
- Released: July 11, 2025
- Genre: Hip-hop
- Length: 3:16
- Label: Self-released
- Songwriters: Gene Thornton; Terrence Thornton; Pharrell Williams
- Producer: Pharrell Williams

"So Be It" is a song by American hip-hop duo Clipse, released exclusively as a music video on Instagram and YouTube on June 17, 2025, as a promotional single for their fourth studio album, Let God Sort Em Out (2025). It was produced by Pharrell Williams and contains a sample of "Maza Akoulo" by Saudi Arabian musician Talal Maddah. The song gained significant attention over a diss directed at rapper Travis Scott. On the album's launch day, a remix with a different instrumental, "So Be It Pt. II", was temporarily on streaming services before being replaced with the original. Neither version appeared on the initial physical editions of the album.

== Background ==
In an interview with GQ following the song's release, Pusha T explained his animosity toward Travis Scott, first citing his 2023 song "Meltdown", in which featured artist Drake (who has a feud with Pusha T) took aim at Pusha T and Pharrell (despite Scott having a friendly relationship with the latter). Furthermore, Pusha revealed that Scott interrupted one of Clipse's sessions at Pharrell's studio at the Louis Vuitton headquarters in Paris (where they recorded most of Let God Sort Em Out) to promote his album Utopia. Clipse was not interested in his music, but Scott filmed a teaser of himself playing it for Pharrell. Scott played "Meltdown", but without Drake's verse. Pusha T was especially disgusted with Scott remaining neutral in the affairs of his associates—such as Drake's feuds with rappers Kanye West and Kendrick Lamar—which he perceived as a lack of loyalty. Referring to himself cutting ties with West and GOOD Music, Pusha said "I personally have been removed from that crew and those people for a minute. So, that's where my issue comes in—like, dawg, don't even come over here with that, because at the end of the day, I don't play how y'all play. To me, that really was just like…he's a whore. He's a whore."

On June 17, 2025, Clipse premiered "So Be It" with Funkmaster Flex and DJ Hed, who played it on Hot 97 and Instagram Live respectively.

Because the sample of "Maza Akloulou" by Saudi Arabian musician Talal Maddah was not able to be cleared in time for the release of Let God Sort Em Out, Pharrell produced an alternate version of the song titled “So Be It Pt. II” without the sample. Swizz Beatz, who was in Saudi Arabia at the time, worked with his connections to get the sample cleared, allowing the original version of the song with the sample to be officially released.

== Composition and lyrics ==
The production is composed of a Middle Eastern-inspired violin sample and "sparse, thumping" drums and "backwards" 808s. Lyrically, Clipse raps about drug dealing and boasts their wealth. Pusha disses Kanye West and threatens his enemies ("Fuckin' with P, get somethin' immediate / Your soul don’t like your body, we helped you free it / Then we wait for TMZ to leak it / It ain't no secrets, so be it, so be it") in the opening verse. In the third verse, No Malice sends shots at Jim Jones and acknowledges Pharrell being a solo producer, alluding to his and Chad Hugo's legal dispute over rights to the name of their group, The Neptunes. Pusha targets Travis Scott in the fourth and final verse, referencing his breakup with media personality Kylie Jenner: "You cried in front of me, you died in front of me / Calabasas took your bitch and your pride in front of me / Her Utopia had moved right up the street / And her lip gloss was poppin', she ain't need you to eat". He also mentions Alexander "A.E." Edwards, the Vice President of A&R at Def Jam Recordings, who is the best friend and right-hand man of Jenner's ex-boyfriend and rapper Tyga: "The 'net gon' call it the way that they see it / But I got the video, I can share and A.E. it / They wouldn't believe it, but I can't unsee it / Lucky I ain't TMZ it, so be it, so be it".

== Critical reception ==
The song received generally positive reviews. Zachary Horvath of HotNewHipHop wrote "But potential dissing aside, the music is great on its own. Pharrell remains in tip-top shape here, with a head-bopping beat and a haunting sample to kick off the track. The verses from the Clipse stars are also sharp again and this is shaping up to be the rap AOTY." Preezy Brown of Vibe called the song a "triumphant return to form—sharp, stylish, and unapologetically elite", commenting that Pusha T "sounds as focused as ever" and No Malice "delivers with cryptic flair". Brown also remarked, "Pharrell's production is masterful—strings and Arabian flourishes swirl into a backdrop that feels celebratory and menacing all at once." Alphonse Pierre of Pitchfork noted somewhat disappointedly of the song, "Pusha and Malice’s hearts aren’t in their disses...But Clipse are a feeling, and I don’t feel that they really care that much about what Travis, or Kanye, or, uh, Jim Jones have going on."

== Live performances ==
The duo performed the song on Jimmy Kimmel Live! in October 2025.

== Music video ==
The music video was released alongside the single. Directed by Hannan Hussain and filmed in black-and-white, it sees Clipse wearing jewelry and rapping at a mansion, with classic luxury cars scattered around them.

== Charts ==
Chart performance for "So Be It"
| Chart (2025) | Peak position |
|---|---|
| Canada Hot 100 (Billboard) | 97 |
| Global 200 (Billboard) | 173 |
| US Billboard Hot 100 | 62 |
| US Hot R&B/Hip-Hop Songs (Billboard) | 19 |

Chart performance for "So Be It Pt. II"
| Chart (2025) | Peak position |
|---|---|
| UK Indie (Official Charts) | 39 |
