= Exclusive Audio Footage =

Studio album by Clipse
- Released: April 28, 1999 (intended)
- Genre: Hip-hop
- Length: 68:12
- Label: Elektra
- Producer: The Neptunes

Clipse chronology
Exclusive Audio Footage (1999)	Lord Willin' (2002)

Exclusive Audio Footage is an unreleased studio album by American hip-hop duo Clipse. The album spawned one single and music video "The Funeral", which hit airwaves in 1999. Promotional CD and vinyl copies exist and the LP has been leaked online in full. In 2004, counterfeit vinyl pressings of the album were released.

In 2022, the album was unofficially released on streaming platforms, comprising 20 songs. It has since been removed.

== Background ==
Exclusive Audio Footage was meant to be the debut album of Clipse, after the group signed with Elektra Records. The album's only single was "The Funeral". It failed to catch success, and its label, Elektra, decided to indefinitely shelve the album. Clipse was released from its record contract not long afterward. At the time of the album's release, Clipse member Pusha T was known as "Terrar" and No Malice was known as "Malice".

Exclusive Audio Footage also marked the beginning of the Clipse's recording partnership with The Neptunes. Most of the album's content is very similar to the Clipse's following albums Lord Willin' and Hell Hath No Fury, focusing on the duo' drug-dealing pasts, though it was much more "theatrical" and "movie-esque" than either of its following albums.

== Cover art ==
Promo CDs and vinyl of the album do not contain any visible artwork. The bootleg album artwork is taken from the 2002 Lord Willin' photo shoot. Over time and through other bootleg copies the image was used as the album's default cover.

== Critical reception ==
Professional ratings
Review scores
Source	Rating
The Source	3.5/5 stars

In a contemporaneous review, Kim Osorio of The Source praised the album, calling it a "delightful deviation" from the usual hip-hop sound of the late 1990s. She highlighted the group's "concept-driven lyrics and original, fast-paced rhyme style", but named the album's production as its best part, as she believed that it helps Clipse stand out among other artists and improves "a few mediocre moments" of the album.

== Track listing ==
All tracks produced by The Neptunes.

Exclusive Audio Footage — Promo CD track listing.
No.	Title	Length
1.	"Prayer"	1:03
2.	"Hear Me Out"	2:56
3.	"Power"	3:57
4.	"Interlude"	1:18
5.	"You Don't Even Know" (featuring Kelis)	4:05
6.	"Breakfast In Cairo" (featuring Kurupt and Noreaga)	4:10
7.	"Interlude"	1:39
8.	"Hostage"	4:24
9.	"Wild Cowboy" (featuring Markita)	4:16
10.	"Got Caught Dealin'"	4:16
11.	"Interlude"	0:13
12.	"Taiwan To Texas"	4:07
13.	"Interlude"	0:14
14.	"Stick Girl"	3:59
15.	"You Can't Touch Me" (featuring Lee Harvey and Nako)	4:54
16.	"Feel Like Me"	3:42
17.	"Bodysnatchers" (featuring Pharrell)	4:49
18.	"Diana Ross" (featuring The Teamsters)	4:22
19.	"Watch Over Me"	4:01
20.	"Interlude"	2:16
21.	"The Funeral"	3:31
Total length:		68:12

Notes

- A remix called "Got Caught Dealin' - Part 2" featuring Pharrell, along with "The Funeral" and the original "Got Caught Dealin'" were all released as promo CD singles throughout 1999.
