= Clipse =

American hip-hop duo

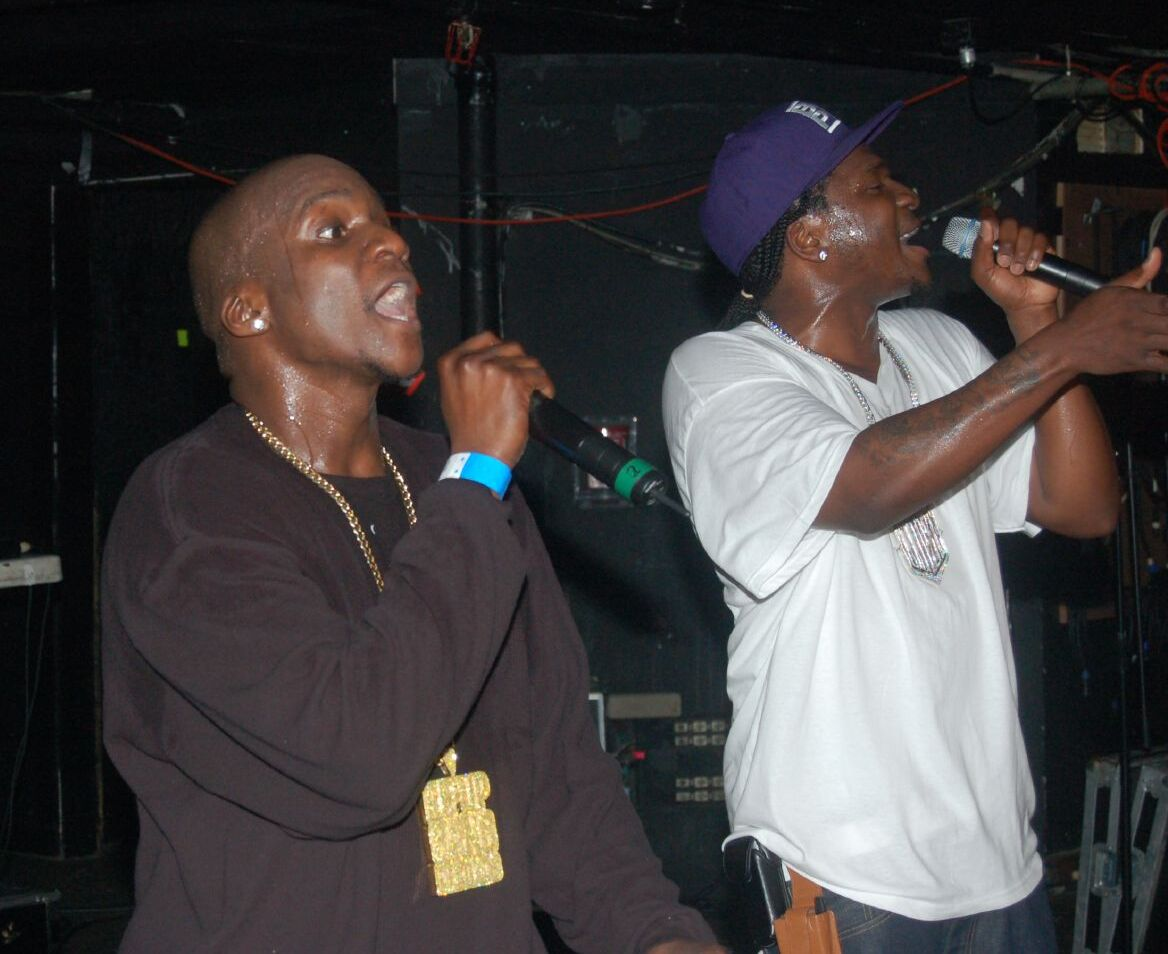
- Clipse performing at The Middle East in February 2007

Background information
- Origin: Virginia Beach, Virginia, U.S.
- Genres: East Coast hip-hop; gangsta rap; hardcore hip-hop
- Years active: 1994–2010; 2019–present
- Labels: Elektra; Star Trak; Arista; Jive; Re-up; Columbia; Def Jam; Roc Nation Distribution
- Spinoffs: Re-Up Gang
- Members: Malice; Pusha T

Clipse (pronounced "clips"), also known as the Clipse, are an American hip-hop duo from Virginia Beach, Virginia. Formed in 1994, it consists of brothers Gene "Malice" and Terrence "Pusha T" Thornton. Pusha T was known as Terrar during the group's early years, while Malice was originally known as Malicious. As key figures in establishing Virginia as one of Down South's strongholds in hip-hop, the duo's subject matter is frequently based around the illegal drug trade.

The two were discovered by producer and fellow Virginia Beach native, Pharrell Williams, who convinced the artists to work in tandem. Williams served as executive and lead producer for their first two albums, as part of the Neptunes and as a frequent guest performer. Williams led Clipse to sign with Elektra Records, for whom they recorded an album, Exclusive Audio Footage. The album was shelved, and the duo were dropped by the label after the lukewarm commercial response of its supposed lead single, "The Funeral".

In 2001, Williams signed the duo to Arista Records as the first act to sign with his newfound Star Trak Entertainment imprint. Their debut studio album, Lord Willin' (2002), peaked at number four on the Billboard 200, received gold certification by the Recording Industry Association of America (RIAA), and was met with critical praise. After a several-year delay due to record-label reshuffling, the duo's second album and third albums, Hell Hath No Fury (2006) and Til the Casket Drops (2009), were both met with critical acclaim despite commercial stagnation. In 2010, the duo went on hiatus and both members pursued solo careers.

Clipse officially reunited to guest appear alongside Kenny G on Kanye West's 2019 song "Use This Gospel", from the latter's album Jesus Is King. The duo's fourth studio album, Let God Sort Em Out was self-released (distributed by Roc Nation Distribution) on July 11, 2025, to widespread acclaim. Produced entirely by Williams, it was preceded by the singles "Ace Trumpets", "So Be It" and "Chains & Whips".

== History ==
=== 1993–2000: Formation and Exclusive Audio Footage ===
The Thornton brothers were born in The Bronx, and in 1979 their family moved to Virginia Beach, Virginia. It was here that the brothers were exposed to the illegal cocaine trade, and this would become an essential part of their musical career. In junior high school, Malice began rapping in a group called Def Dual Productions, for whom the producer was classmate Timbaland, at the time going by DJ Timmy Tim. During this time, Malice also began selling the drugs that would form the basis of much of the duo's lyrical subject matter. A mutual friend introduced him to Chad Hugo in 1988, with whom he started recording songs as a solo act. In 1990, he met Hugo's friends Magoo, Larry Live, and Pharrell Williams through other mutual friends. Williams and Hugo formed the production duo The Neptunes a few years later and continued recording with Malice. After graduating high school in 1991, Malice enlisted to serve in the Army to support his family, working as a generator mechanic. It would not be until Malice's enlistment ended in 1994 that the brothers would start recording together. Pusha, five years Malice's junior, would accompany his brother to recording sessions at Hugo's house. He eventually decided to rap as well. They recorded their first song together "Thief in the Night", featuring vocals from Pharrell, who suggested they should become a duo, calling themselves Full Eclipse, later shortening their name to only Clipse. The Neptunes helped them secure a recording contract with Elektra Records in 1996. Under Elektra, and with the Neptunes handling its production, the Clipse recorded its debut album, Exclusive Audio Footage. The group's first single, "The Funeral", helped to generate fan interest in the album, but failed to make a significant chart impact. With "The Funeral" deemed a failure, Exclusive Audio Footage itself was shelved. The Clipse was released from Elektra shortly thereafter. However, promotional CDs of the album still exist; it would get an unofficial release on May 2, 2022, via Spotify.

=== 2001–2002: Breakthrough and Lord Willin' ===
In early 2001, Williams signed the duo to Arista Records through his recently established Star Trak Entertainment imprint. With the backing of the record label and the Neptunes, Clipse proceeded to record material for their debut album. The lead single "Grindin'" was released on May 14, 2002, and was an instant hit. It peaked at number 30 on the Billboard Hot 100. The song would go on to become Clipse's most famous song, and many publications ranked the single highly on their year-end lists. The second single, "When the Last Time", was dropped on July 30. It would become the group's highest-charting song, peaking at number 19 on the Billboard Hot 100, and staying on the chart for 21 weeks. Clipse then released its commercial debut Lord Willin' on August 20, 2002. The album opened at Number 1 on Billboard's Top R&B/Hip-Hop Albums chart and Number 4 on the Billboard 200, selling 122,000 in its first week. On October 1, 2002—a month after its release—Lord Willin' was certified Gold by the RIAA. A third single, "Ma, I Don't Love Her" featuring Faith Evans was released on December 3, 2002. It was a modest hit, peaking at number 86 on the Billboard Hot 100, and staying on the chart for six weeks.

Also in 2002, Clipse were guest artists on Justin Timberlake's first solo single, "Like I Love You", another Neptunes-produced crossover radio hit. It peaked at number 11 on the Billboard Hot 100. Clipse also featured on the song "What Happened to That Boy" with Birdman. Pusha T featured in singer Nivea's second single "Run Away (I Wanna Be with U)", which peaked at number 47 in Australia. In 2003, Clipse went on tour with rapper 50 Cent.

=== 2003–2006: Label dispute and Hell Hath No Fury ===
In late 2003, Clipse began recording material for their second album, Hell Hath No Fury. However, further work on the album ground to a halt in 2004, when Arista Records's urban artists were absorbed by its sister label Jive Records as part of a larger merger between Sony Music Entertainment and BMG. Due to contractual requirements, Clipse was forced to stay on Jive, while Star Trak and the rest of its roster moved to a new home at Interscope Records.

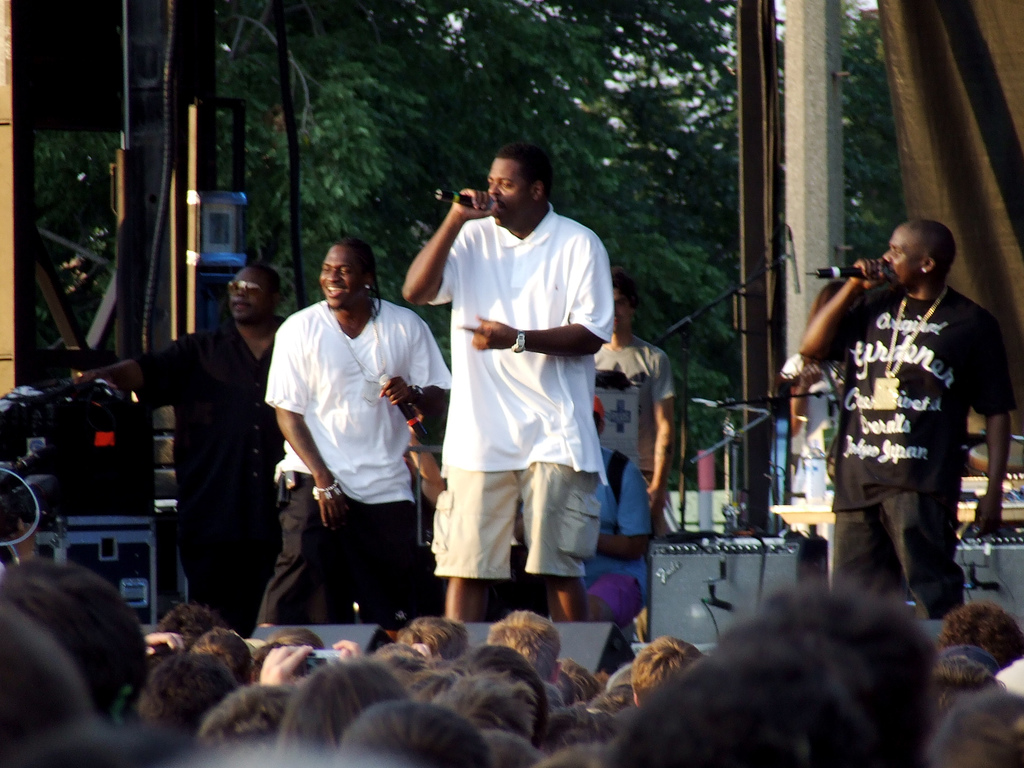
Pusha T and No Malice of Clipse performing with Ab-Liva from the Re-Up Gang.

While Clipse resumed work on the album, and eventually finished its recording, the duo became increasingly frustrated with Jive, as the label overlooked it in favor of the more pop-oriented acts on its roster, which caused numerous delays in the release of Hell Hath No Fury. As delays continued, the group asked for a formal release from its contract. When Jive refused to grant this request, the duo sued the label. While the litigation took place, Clipse released new material through their We Got It 4 Cheap mixtape series, which featured Clipse and Philadelphia rappers Ab-Liva and Sandman. The group was known collectively as the Re-Up Gang. We Got it 4 Cheap Vol. 1, which was the first official collection of new material from Clipse since the release of their debut album Lord Willin', was released in 2004 and received positive reviews from critics. Vol. 2 of the series was released in 2005 received widespread critical acclaim. It is considered to be one of the best mixtape of the 2000s. Online music magazine Pitchfork placed the tape at number 130 on their list of top 200 albums of the 2000s, and number 2 on their list of the top 50 rap mixtapes of the millennium.

On May 9, 2006, Clipse finally reached an agreement with Jive Records. They were to release the album through its own Re-Up Records label along with Jive. They then toured with Ice Cube throughout May, and set the release date as August 29. Clipse dropped the first single, "Mr. Me Too" with Pharrell Williams on May 23, 2006. It peaked at number 65 on Hot R&B/Hip-Hop Songs chart. However, the release date of the album was pushed to October 31. On October 31, Clipse did not drop the album, instead dropped the single "Wamp Wamp (What It Do)" with Slim Thug. The song peaked at number 96 on Hot R&B/Hip-Hop Songs chart. Hell Hath No Fury was finally released on November 28, 2006. The album received universal acclaim with many publications citing it to be the duo's best. The hip-hop magazine XXL gave the album a "XXL" rating, marking it as a five-star album. Only five albums had previously received that honor. The album currently holds an average score of 89 on Metacritic. It debuted at number 14 on the Billboard 200, selling 80,000 copies in its first week. The album would go on to receive high positions on many publications year and decade end charts, and is considered to be one of the best albums of the 2000s.

=== 2007–2009: Columbia Records and Til the Casket Drops ===
In a May 19, 2007, interview with Eye Weekly, Clipse revealed that the group had been officially released from its recording contract with Jive. After this, the duo began discussions with several record labels, eventually signing with Columbia Records on October 26, 2007. On February 5, 2008, the duo released the 3rd installment in the We Got it 4 Cheap mixtape series as a free download on their website. On August 8, 2008, the duo released the Re-Up Gang's debut studio album, Clipse Presents: The Re-Up Gang through Koch Records. The album's first single, "Fast Life", was produced by Scott Storch. The single was originally slated for the duo's third album, but they felt it would be better used for the Re-Up Gang album. Only Malice and Pusha T appear on the track. It is the only studio album from the group as after the release of the album, Sandman left the group.

In November 2008, Clipse announced the launch of their fashion line, Play Cloths. A mixtape called Road to Till the Casket Drops was released on December 1, 2008, in promotion of the line and their upcoming album.

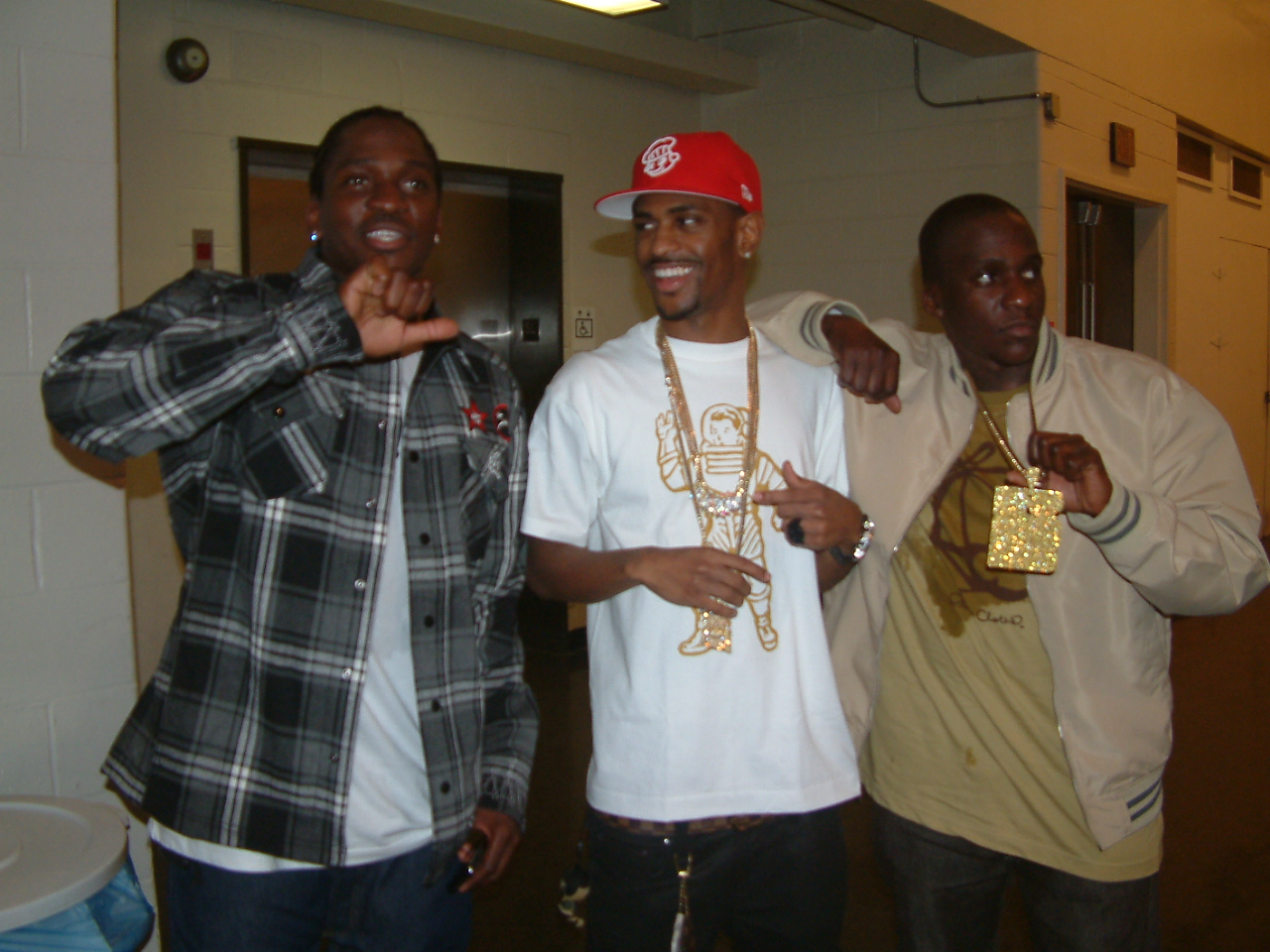
Clipse with rapper Big Sean in 2009

Til the Casket Drops was released on December 8, 2009. In a departure from the group's previous works, which only featured production from the Neptunes, the album was produced by Sean Combs' production team the Hitmen, and DJ Khalil. The album did not fare as well commercially as the group's first two albums, peaking at number 41 on the Billboard Hot 200 albums chart, selling 31,000 copies in its first week.

=== 2010–2017: Solo endeavors and hiatus ===
At a concert on April 30, 2010, Malice announced that he and Pusha T would release solo albums later in the year. On September 12, 2010, Pusha T confirmed to MTV that he had signed to Kanye West's G.O.O.D. Music label. He would go on to work with Kanye on his 2010 album My Beautiful Dark Twisted Fantasy, and be featured on the hit single "Runaway". He has gone on to embark a successful solo career and has released four studio albums. In 2015, he was named president of G.O.O.D. Music.

In 2011, Malice published his book Wretched, Pitiful, Poor, Blind & Naked. The book is a memoir about his life, including fearing contracting HIV, as well as his conversion to Christianity. In 2012, he changed his stage name to No Malice. He felt his previous name had a negative meaning and now wanted to spread positive messages. He collaborated with Lecrae on his mixtape Church Clothes, in the song "Darkest Hour". In 2013, he released his debut studio album Hear Ye Him via Reinvision, which featured his brother, reuniting on the track "Shame the Devil". In 2016, he released the documentary The End Of Malice, which recalled the exact moment Clipse broke up and why. His second studio album, Let the Dead Bury the Dead was released in 2017 by Reinvision.

Despite various rumors of a Clipse reunion, No Malice said at SXSW in 2014, that the duo was finished and there would not be another Clipse album. By 2016, No Malice indicated he was open to a Clipse reunion, saying, "I'ma tell you that I learned to never say never, and I don't shut the door on anything. I really don't. In fact, I would like to see Clipse do it... I’ve said it before, my brother and I would definitely make clown soup out of all these MCs. Now that much I know."

=== 2019–present: Return and Let God Sort Em Out ===
In 2019, Clipse reunited to feature on Kanye West's album Jesus Is King on the track "Use This Gospel". Pusha T expressed his feelings towards the duo collaborating again in an interview with Vulture, stating "I'm the younger brother, man. I mean, I'm happier than — I can't even express it!" He claimed that "The whole theme of the Jesus Is King album totally speaks to where my brother is". In 2022, Clipse reunited again to feature on Japanese fashion designer and DJ Nigo's album I Know Nigo!, on the track "Punch Bowl" produced by The Neptunes. They also reunited on the track "I Pray for You" on Pusha T's 2022 album, It's Almost Dry; credited once again as Malice.

The two debuted a new song in June 2024, titled "Birds Don't Sing", at a Louis Vuitton fashion show. Shortly afterwards they announced their work on new music and a new album, entirely produced by Pharrell Williams. Clipse revealed the title of their upcoming fourth studio album, Let God Sort Em Out, their first album since 2009, featuring guest appearances by Kendrick Lamar, Nas, John Legend, and Stove God Cooks, among others. By the end of 2024, No Malice announced the duo's signing with Def Jam Recordings, in anticipation for their upcoming album.

On May 30, 2025, Clipse released "Ace Trumpets", as the lead single for their upcoming album, which was mostly recorded at the Louis Vuitton headquarters in Paris, France, and was released in collaboration with Roc Nation on July 11.

In June 2025, during an interview with GQ, the duo revealed that they were dropped from the Def Jam label as well as Pusha T as a solo artist, and also confirmed Kendrick Lamar's appearance in Let God Sort Em Out. The next day, Pusha T's longtime manager Steven Victor revealed during an interview with Billboard that the rapper actually had to pay an undisclosed seven-figure sum to be dropped from the Def Jam label, in order to be released from both Clipse's and his own contractual obligations, elaborating further how the label has been suppressing Pusha T's collaborations with other artists and even his own music releases since his feud with Canadian rapper Drake in 2018.

A final teaser track, "So Be It", was sent to DJs and previewed on June 16. "So Be It" was released as a promotional single with a music video the next day, and GQ published a follow-up article (with unused excerpts from the interview) in which the song was discussed, including lyrics from Pusha T which diss former GOOD Music labelmate Travis Scott.

During the 2025 Jubilee, the "World Meeting on Human Fraternity 2025" took place on the St. Peter's Square at the Vatican City on 12 and 13 September, with concert of Andrea Bocelli, Pharrell Williams with the gospel choir Voices of Fire, and John Legend. Clipse performed the song "The Birds Don't Sing" along with John Legend at the second date during the Grace For The World concert on September 13, making history for being the first rappers to ever perform at the Vatican City.

On November 7, 2025, Clipse received five nominations for the 68th Annual Grammy Awards, including the Album of The Year and Best Rap Album categories for Let God Sort Em Out, Best Rap Performance for "Chains & Whips", Best Rap Song for "The Birds Don't Sing", and Best Music Video for "So Be It". On February 1, 2026, they won the Best Rap Performance category, marking it as their first Grammy Award won in their catalogue.

== Lyrical content ==
Clipse's songs frequently discuss drug dealing, specifically cocaine, often using metaphors to refer to this activity. This has led some critics to refer to their style as "coke rap," along with other artists such as Raekwon and Young Jeezy. Other themes include clubbing, guns, sexual relationships and infidelity, and braggadocio.

== Awards and nominations ==
This is a list of awards and nominations received by Clipse.

Award	Year	Category	Nominated work	Result	Ref.
BET Awards	2003	Best Music Group	Themselves	Nominated	
BET Awards	2010	Best Group	Themselves	Nominated	
BET Awards	2026	Album of the Year	Let God Sort Em Out	Won	
BET Awards	2026	Best Group	Themselves	Won	
BET Awards	2026	Best Collaboration	"Chains & Whips" (featuring Kendrick Lamar)	Won	
BET Awards	2026	Viewer's Choice Award	"Chains & Whips" (featuring Kendrick Lamar)	Nominated	
Billboard Music Awards	2002	R&B Artist	Themselves	Nominated	
Billboard Music Awards	2002	New R&B/Hip-Hop Artist	Themselves	Nominated	
Grammy Awards	2003	Best Rap/Sung Collaboration	"Like I Love You" (as featured artist)	Nominated	
Grammy Awards	2026	Album Of The Year	Let God Sort Em Out	Nominated	
Grammy Awards	2026	Best Rap Album	Let God Sort Em Out	Nominated	
Grammy Awards	2026	Best Rap Performance	"Chains & Whips" (featuring Kendrick Lamar)	Won	
Grammy Awards	2026	Best Rap Song	"The Birds Don't Sing" (featuring John Legend and Voices of Fire)	Nominated	
Grammy Awards	2026	Best Music Video	"So Be It"	Nominated	
NAACP Image Awards	2026	Outstanding Album	Let God Sort Em Out	Nominated	
NAACP Image Awards	2026	Outstanding Hip-Hop/Rap Song	"Chains & Whips" (featuring Kendrick Lamar)	Nominated	
NAACP Image Awards	2026	Outstanding Duo, Group or Collaboration (Traditional)	"Chains & Whips" (Clipse, Kendrick Lamar, Pharrell Williams, Pusha T, Malice)	Nominated	
Source Hip-Hop Music Awards	2003	Single of the Year, Group	"Grindin'"	Won	
Source Hip-Hop Music Awards	2003	Breakthrough Artist of the Year	Themselves	Nominated	

== Discography ==
Studio albums

- Exclusive Audio Footage (1999; shelved)
- Lord Willin' (2002)
- Hell Hath No Fury (2006)
- Til the Casket Drops (2009)
- Let God Sort Em Out (2025)
