= Malice (rapper) =

American rapper (born 1972)

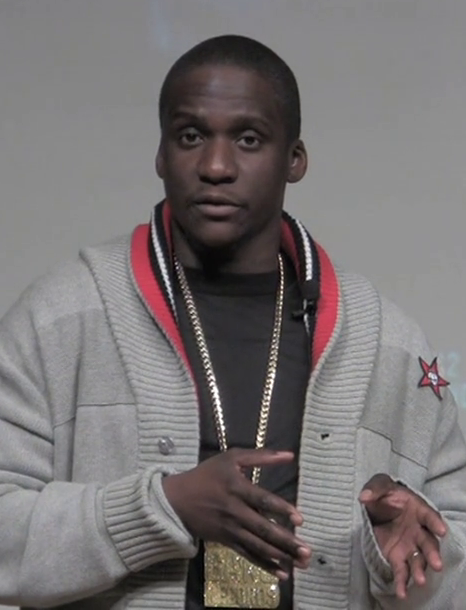
- Malice in 2011

Background information
- Also known as: Malicious; No Malice
- Born: Gene Elliott Thornton Jr. August 18, 1972 (age 54); The Bronx, New York City, U.S.
- Origin: Virginia Beach, Virginia, U.S.
- Genres: East Coast hip-hop; Christian hip-hop
- Occupations: Rapper; songwriter
- Years active: 1992–present
- Labels: Reinvision; Arista; Re-Up
- Member of: Clipse
- Formerly of: Re-Up Gang

Gene Elliott Thornton Jr. (born August 18, 1972), better known by his stage name Malice (formerly Malicious and later No Malice), is an American rapper from Virginia Beach, Virginia. He is best known for being one half of hip-hop duo Clipse, alongside his younger brother and fellow rapper Pusha T. Malice released his solo debut album Hear Ye Him in 2013, followed by Let the Dead Bury the Dead in 2017.

== Life and career ==
=== 1972–2009: Early life and Clipse ===
Malice was born Gene Elliott Thornton Jr. on August 18, 1972, in the Bronx borough of New York City. He and his family later moved down south to Virginia Beach. He and his younger brother Pusha T formed the duo Clipse while Malice was producing demos with production duo the Neptunes, consisting of Pharrell Williams and Chad Hugo. Impressed with their lyrical talents, Williams formed a working relationship with the duo. He eventually helped them secure a recording contract with Elektra Records, in 1997. Under Elektra, and with The Neptunes handling its production, Clipse recorded their debut album Exclusive Audio Footage. The group's debut single "The Funeral", helped to generate fan interest in the album, but failed to make a significant commercial impact. With "The Funeral" deemed a failure, Exclusive Audio Footage itself was shelved indefinitely. Clipse were subsequently released from their recording contract shortly thereafter.

In early 2001, Williams signed the duo to Arista Records, through his recently established Star Trak Entertainment imprint. Clipse released their commercial debut Lord Willin', on August 20, 2002. The album debuted at No. 1 on Billboard's Top R&B/Hip-hop Album chart and No. 4 on the Billboard 200, fueled by the strength of the lead singles "Grindin'" and "When the Last Time", which peaked at No. 30 and No. 19 respectively, on the Billboard Hot 100. The album's third single "Ma, I Don't Love Her" (featuring Faith Evans), was a modest hit, reaching No. 86 on the Hot 100. On October 1, 2002—only a month after its release—Lord Willin' was certified gold by the Recording Industry Association of America (RIAA).

In late 2003, Clipse began recording material for its second album, Hell Hath No Fury. However, further work on the album ground to a halt in 2004, when Arista Records's urban artists were absorbed into its sister label Jive Records as part of a larger merger between Sony Music Entertainment and BMG. Due to contractual requirements, Clipse was forced to stay on Jive, while Star Trak and the rest of its roster moved to a new home at Interscope Records. While Clipse resumed work on the album, and eventually finished its recording, the duo became increasingly frustrated with Jive, as the label overlooked it in favor of the more pop-oriented acts on its roster, which caused numerous delays in the release of Hell Hath No Fury. As delays continued, the group asked for a formal release from its contract. When Jive refused to grant this request, the duo sued the label.

On May 9, 2006, Clipse finally reached an agreement with Jive Records to release the album through its own label, Re-Up Records, along with Jive. Hell Hath No Fury was finally released on November 28, 2006. It spawned two singles: "Mr. Me Too" with Pharrell Williams and "Wamp Wamp (What It Do)" with Slim Thug. While the album received a great deal of critical acclaim, its sales were modest, at 78,000 in the first week. The hip hop magazine XXL gave the album a "XXL" rating, marking it as a five-star album. At the time only five albums had previously received that honor. In a May 19, 2007, interview with Eye Weekly, Clipse revealed that the group had been officially released from its recording contract with Jive. After this, the duo began discussions with several record labels, eventually signing with Columbia Records on October 26, 2007. The follow-up to Hell Hath No Fury, titled Til the Casket Drops, was released on December 8, 2009, via Columbia Records. In a departure from the group's previous works, which only featured production from the Neptunes, the album features production from Sean "Diddy" Combs' production team The Hitmen, and DJ Khalil among others. The album did not fare as well commercially as the group's first two albums, peaking at No. 41 on the Billboard 200 albums chart.

=== 2010–present: Solo career, Hear Ye Him and Clipse's reunion ===
In April 2010, Malice announced that he and Pusha T would release solo albums later in the year, and that they were no longer signed to Columbia Records. In 2011, Malice published his book Wretched, Pitiful, Poor, Blind & Naked, a memoir about his life, including fearing contracting AIDS, as well as his conversion to Christianity.

On March 6, 2012, he announced that he changed his name from Malice to No Malice via a video posted to Twitter. It depicted him viewing himself in a casket in a funeral parlor and walking away. The video, which was directed by Malice, opens with multiple quotes from the Bible: first, from Ephesians 4:31, "Let all bitterness and wrath and anger and clamor and slander be put away from you, along with all malice;" then, from 1 Peter 2:1, "Wherefore laying aside all malice, and all guile, and hypocrisies, and envies, and all evil speakings;" and Romans 1:29, "Being filled with all unrighteousness, fornication, wickedness, covetousness, maliciousness; full of envy, murder, debate, deceit, malignity; whisperers;" and Colossians 3:8, "But now you must put them all away: anger, wrath, malice, slander, and obscene talk from your mouth."

In 2012, Malice collaborated with Lecrae on his mixtape Church Clothes, featured in the song "Darkest Hour". On June 19, 2012, he released the first single from Hear Ye Him titled "June" featuring Eric David. On July 24, 2012, the second single from Hear Ye Him titled "Unforgettable" was released. On January 15, 2013, the third single from Hear Ye Him titled "Smoke & Mirrors" featuring Ab-Liva was released. On May 21, 2013, it was announced that his debut album Hear Ye Him would be released on July 2, 2013, but the album was later pushed back. On June 4, 2013, the fourth single from Hear Ye Him titled "Bury That" was released.

On August 18, 2017, Malice released his second studio album, Let the Dead Bury the Dead, which contains the track "Fake News", where he denounces his earlier work, rapping "Take my catalog, I just as soon set a match to it. Money like a side-chick, I ain't that attached to it".

On July 6, 2018, his single "Give 'Em Game" was released. A reviewer on Jam The Hype wrote, "No Malice spits timeless bars that listeners will gain wisdom from."

Malice reunited with his brother and made a guest appearance as Clipse on the track "Use This Gospel" from Kanye West's 2019 album Jesus Is King. In 2022, they collaborated with Japanese DJ Nigo's on his album I Know Nigo!, featuring in the song "Punch Bowl". The following month, Malice collaborated on his brother Pusha T's album It's Almost Dry, featuring in the song "I Pray for You". He is credited as Malice on the record, rather than No Malice. He was again credited as Malice on the 2024 Clipse track "Birds Don't Sing".

Ahead of Clipse's reunion and upcoming fourth studio album after fifteen years, Let God Sort Em Out, Malice and his brother Pusha T premiered an interview with GQ, where the duo revealed that they were dropped from Def Jam Recordings as well as Pusha T as a solo artist, and also confirmed Kendrick Lamar's appearance in their upcoming album. The next day, Pusha T's longtime manager Steven Victor revealed during an interview with Billboard that the rapper actually had to pay an undisclosed seven-figure sum to be dropped from the Def Jam label, in order to be released from both Clipse's and his own contractual obligations, elaborating further how the label has been suppressing Pusha T's collaborations with other artists and even his own music releases since his feud with Canadian rapper Drake in 2018.

In 2026, Malice appeared on Rapsody's fifth studio album, God Gotta Afro & Gold Hoops, on the track "Black Love".

== Discography ==
=== Studio albums ===
List of studio albums, with selected details
Title	Album details
Hear Ye Him	Released: August 18, 2013; Label: Reinvision; Formats: Digital download
Let the Dead Bury the Dead	Released: August 18, 2017; Label: Reinvision; Formats: Digital download

=== Guest appearances ===
Title	Year	Other artist(s)	Album
"Am I High?"	2001	N.E.R.D	In Search Of...
"Daddy"	2001	Kelis	Wanderland
"Do What You Do" (Remix)	2007	Drake, Nickelus F	Comeback Season
"Kilo" (Remix)	2008	Ghostface Killah, Raekwon	GhostDeini the Great
"Darkest Hour"	2012	Lecrae	Church Clothes
"Soldier"	2013	Bizzle	The Good Fight
"Pull the Curtain Back"	2017	Statik Selektah	8
"Go"	2019	Erick Sermon, TryBishop, Kaelyn Kastle	Vernia
"Black Love"	2026	Rapsody	God Gotta Afro & Gold Hoops
"Heaven Knows Me Well"	2026	Tobe Nwigwe, Jacob Banks	The Bridge
