= List of songs recorded by Pink Martini =

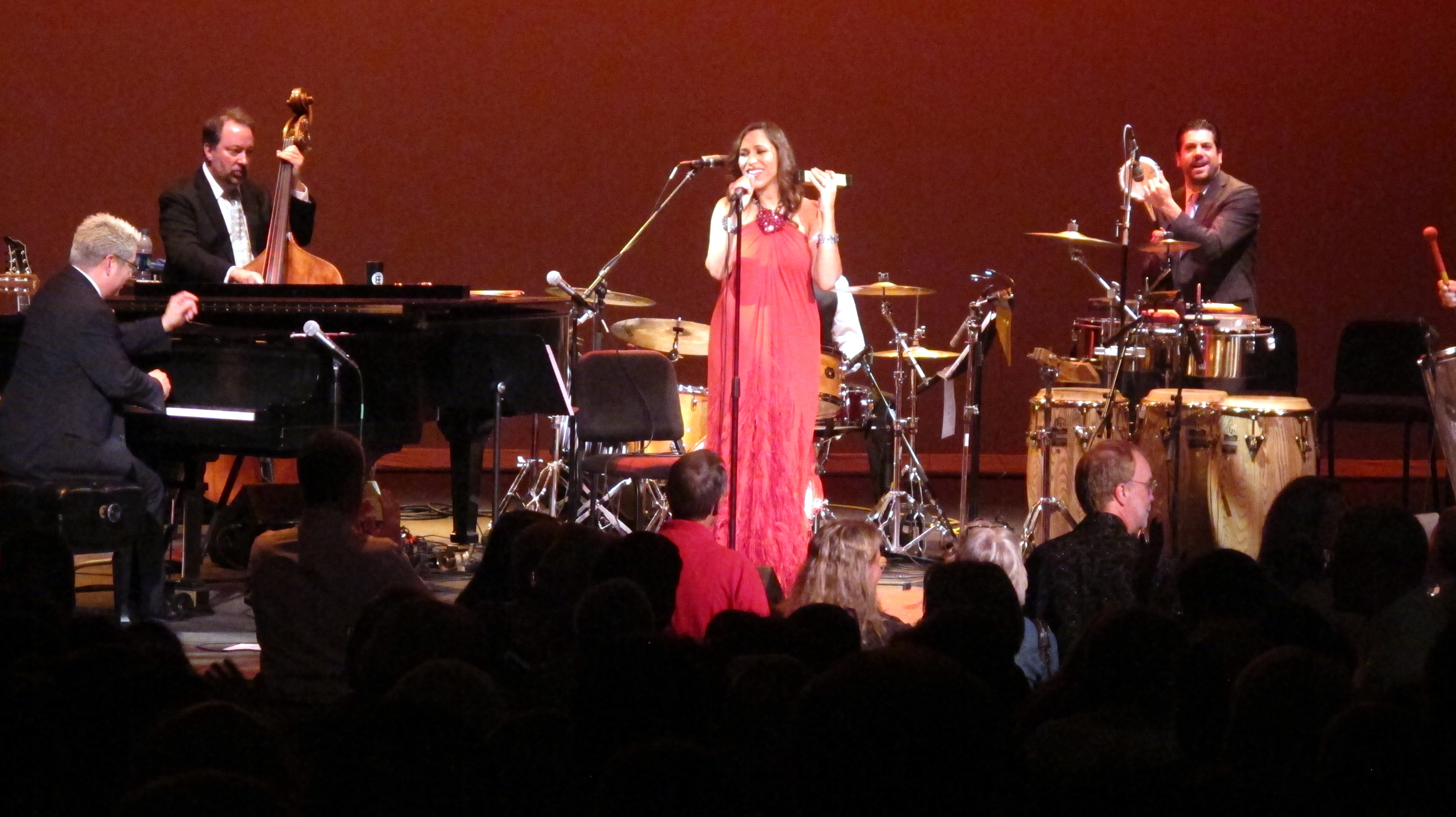
Pink Martini performing in 2012

The American musical group Pink Martini, based in Portland, Oregon, has recorded songs for six studio albums, one compilation album, and one video album featuring live concert footage. Formed by Thomas Lauderdale in 1994, the group that has been described as a "mini-orchestra" performs songs of many music genres in multiple languages by lead vocalist China Forbes. Their debut album Sympathique was released through the group's own independent record label, Heinz Records, in 1997 – subsequent recordings were also released through Heinz. The album includes three original tracks, "Sympathique", "La Soledad", and "Lullaby"; cover versions include Ernesto Lecuona's "Amado Mio", Maurice Ravel's "Boléro", "Brazil" (Ary Barroso), "Never on Sunday" (Manos Hatzidakis), and "Que Sera Sera" by Jay Livingston and Ray Evans.

Hang On Little Tomato, released in 2004, features more original songs; covers include "Anna (El Negro Zumbón)" by Francesco Giordano and Roman Vatro, "Kikuchiyo to Mohshimasu" (Yoichi Suzuki, Michio Yamagami), and Heitor Villa-Lobos' "Song of the Black Swan (O canto do cysne negro)". In 2007, the group released Hey Eugene! Songs include the title track, written by Forbes, and covers in several languages: "Bukra Wba'do" (Mounir Mourad, Fatehi Qorah) in Arabic, the French chanson "Ojalá", "Tempo Perdido" (Ataulfo Alves) in Portuguese, and "Taya Tan" (Taku Izumi, Michio Yamagami) in Japanese, among others. The album also features guest vocals by Little Jimmy Scott on "Tea for Two", originally written by Irving Caesar and Vincent Youmans.

Pink Martini's fourth studio album, Splendor in the Grass, was released in 2009. Forbes performs songs in five languages (English, French, Italian, Neapolitan, and Spanish). Guest vocalists include Ari Shapiro on "But Now I'm Back", Chavela Vargas on "Piensa en mí", and Emilio Delgado on "Sing". The group also released the video album Discover the World: Live in Concert in 2009, which features live concert footage and includes the original song "The Flying Squirrel" and a cover of Ernesto Lecuona's "Malagueña". In 2010, Pink Martini released its fifth studio album, the holiday-themed Joy to the World. Christmas music includes "Do You Hear What I Hear?", "Little Drummer Boy", "Santa Baby", "Silent Night" performed in Arabic, English and German, "We Three Kings", and "White Christmas". Hanukkah music includes Danny Maseng's "Elohai, N'Tzor" and "Ocho Kandelikas" (Flory Jagoda), performed in Ladino. The album also commemorates New Year's Day with "Auld Lang Syne" and Chinese New Year with "Congratulations".

The group released two albums in 2011: 1969 with Saori Yuki and A Retrospective, a compilation album with tracks from previous studio albums plus unreleased material. 1969 includes covers of "Is That All There Is?", "Mas que Nada", and "Puff, the Magic Dragon". A Retrospective contains collaborations with Michael Feinstein ("How Long Will It Last?"), Georges Moustaki ("Ma Solitude"), and film director Gus Van Sant ("Moon River"), along with remixes by Johnny Dynell ("Una Notte a Napoli") and Hiroshi Wada ("Kikuchiyo to Mohshimasu").

== Songs ==
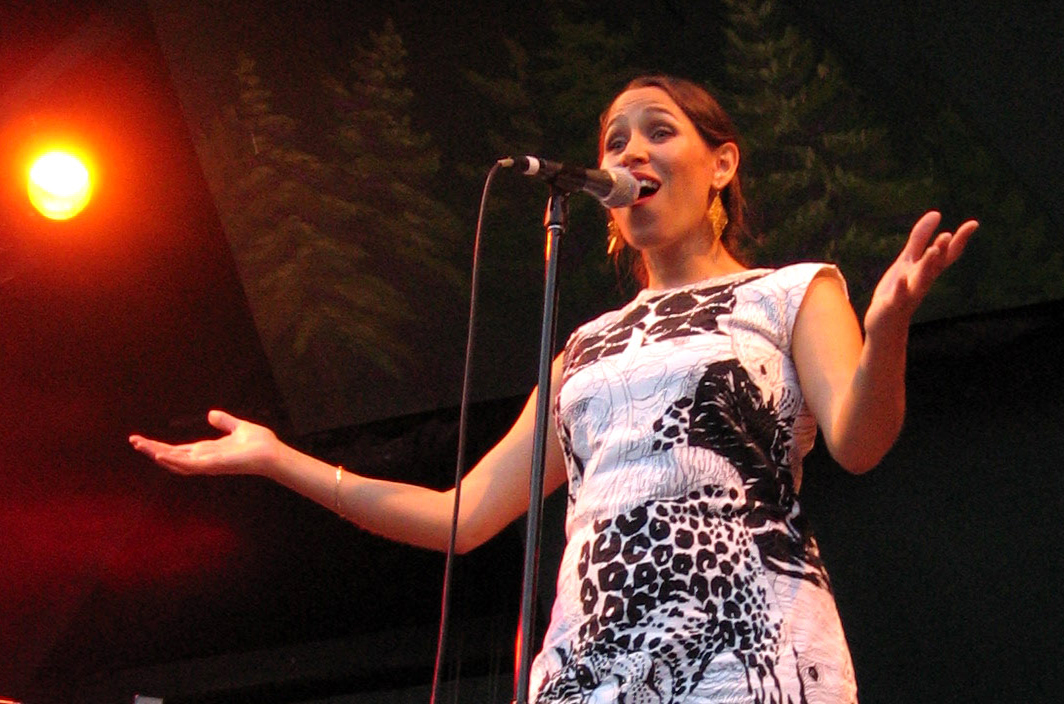
Pink Martini's lead vocalist and songwriter China Forbes performing in 2006

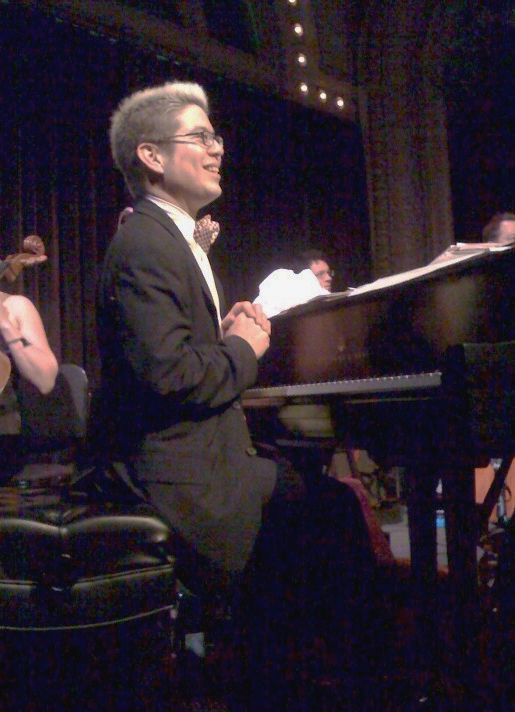
The group's founder Thomas Lauderdale performing in 2008

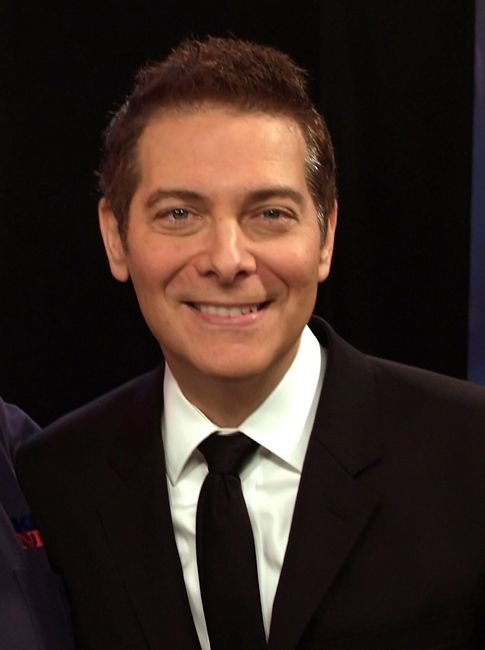
Michael Feinstein provides vocals on the track "How Long Will It Last?", originally by Max Lief and Joseph Meyer.

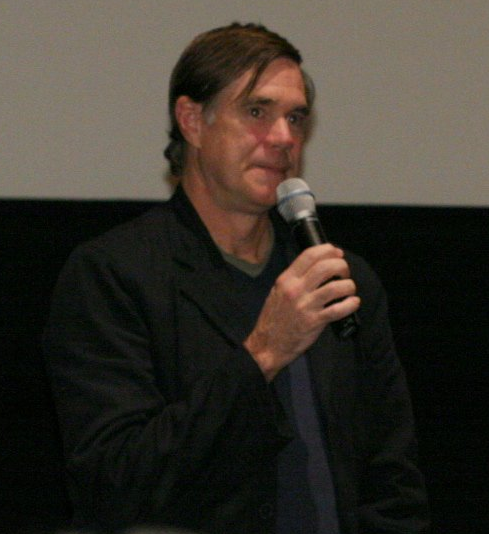
Film director Gus Van Sant made his singing debut on "Moon River" for the 2011 compilation album A Retrospective.

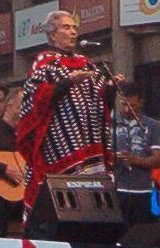
Chavela Vargas (pictured in 2006) performs on "Piensa en mí" for Pink Martini's 2009 album Splendor in the Grass.

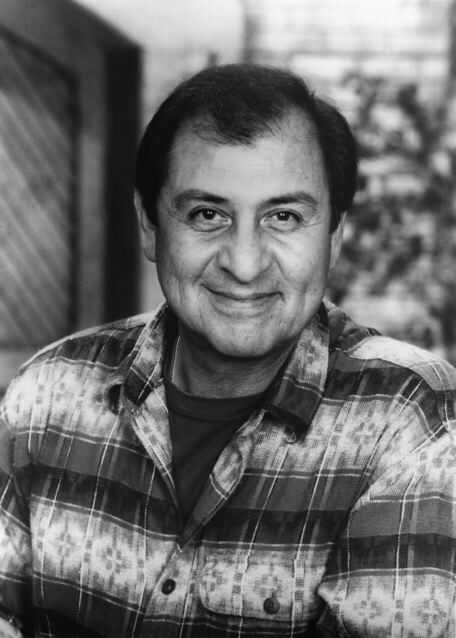
Emilio Delgado contributes guest vocals on Joe Raposo's "Sing" for Splendor in the Grass.

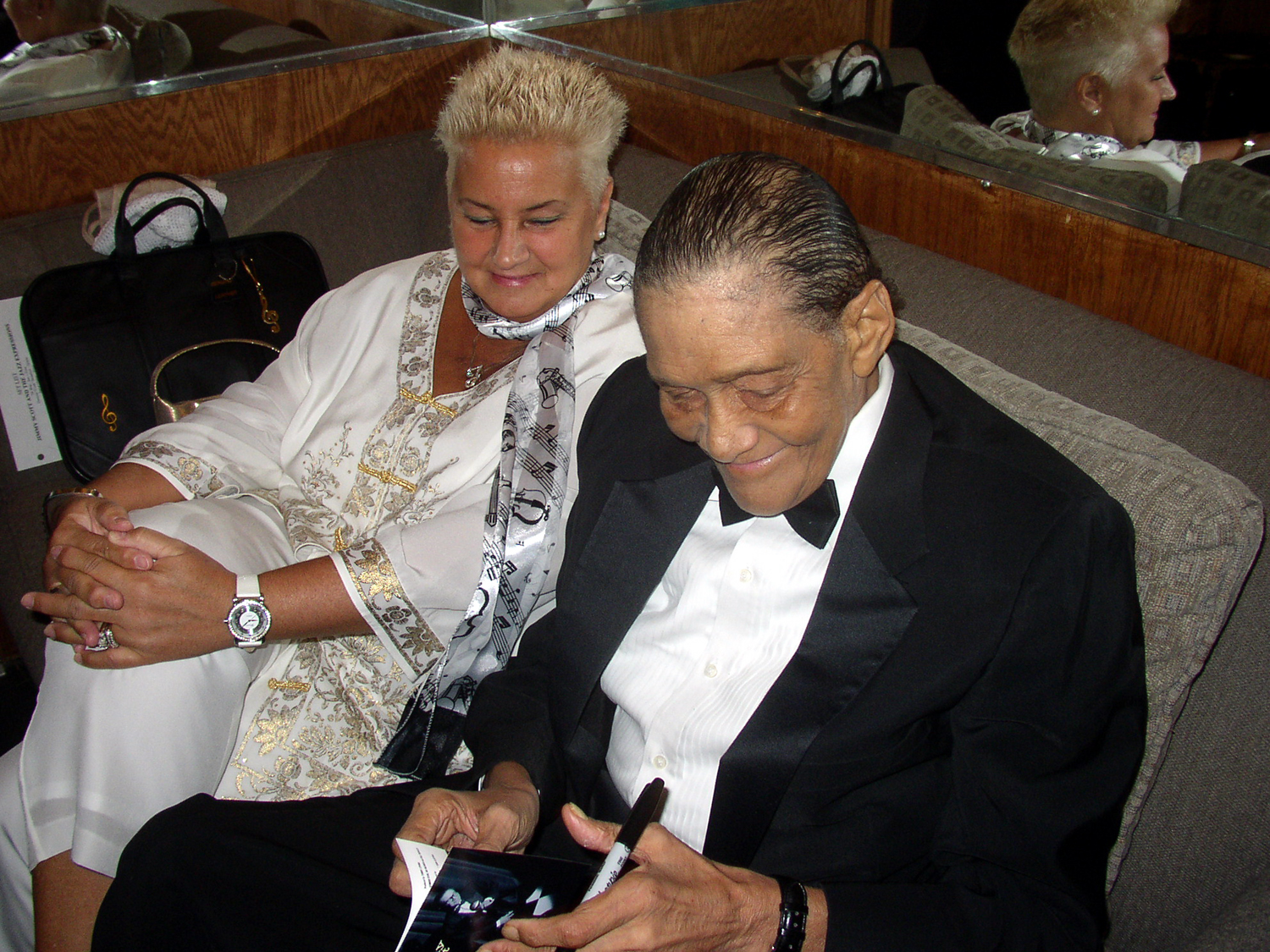
Little Jimmy Scott (pictured in 2009 on right) appears on "Tea for Two" (Irving Caesar, Vincent Youmans), recorded for Pink Martini's 2007 album Hey Eugene!

List of songs recorded by Pink Martini
Song	Artist(s)	Writer(s)	Original release	Year	Ref.
"Amado Mio"	Pink Martini	Doris Fisher; Allan Roberts	Sympathique	1997	
"And Then You're Gone"	Pink Martini	China Forbes; Thomas Lauderdale; Alex Marashian; Derek Rieth; Franz Schubert	Splendor in the Grass	2009	
"Andalucia"	Pink Martini	Ernesto Lecuona	Sympathique	1997	
"Anna (El Negro Zumbón)"	Pink Martini	Francesco Giordano; Roman Vatro	Hang On Little Tomato	2004	
"Aspettami"	Pink Martini	China Forbes; Thomas Lauderdale	Hang On Little Tomato	2004	
"Aspettami" [First Recording]	Pink Martini	China Forbes; Thomas Lauderdale	A Retrospective	2011	
"Auld Lang Syne"	Pink Martini	Robert Burns; Dirgham Sbait; Jacques Sevin; Traditional	Joy to the World	2010	
"Autrefois"	Pink Martini	China Forbes; Thomas Lauderdale	Hang On Little Tomato	2004	
"Bitty Boppy Betty"	Pink Martini	Alex Marashian	Splendor in the Grass	2009	
"Blue Light Yokohama"	Pink Martini and Saori Yuki	Jun Hashimoto; Kyohei Tsutsumi	1969	2011	
"Boléro"	Pink Martini	Maurice Ravel	Sympathique	1997	
"Brazil"	Pink Martini	Ary Barroso	Sympathique	1997	
"Bukra Wba'do"	Pink Martini	Mounir Mourad; Fatehi Qorah	Hey Eugene!	2007	
"But Now I'm Back"	Pink Martini featuring Ari Shapiro	Thomas Lauderdale; Alex Marashian	Splendor in the Grass	2009	
"Cante e Dance"	Pink Martini	Phil Baker	Hey Eugene!	2007	
"City of Night"	Pink Martini	China Forbes; Thomas Lauderdale	Hey Eugene!	2007	
"Clementine"	Pink Martini	China Forbes; Thomas Lauderdale	Hang On Little Tomato	2004	
"Congratulations (A Happy New Year Song)"	Pink Martini	Chen Gexin	Joy to the World	2010	
"Dansez-vous"	Pink Martini	China Forbes; Robert Taylor	Hang On Little Tomato	2004	
"Do You Hear What I Hear?"	Pink Martini	Gloria Shayne Baker; Noël Regney	Joy to the World	2010	
"Donde Estas Yolanda?"	Pink Martini	Manuel Jiménez	Sympathique	1997	
"Donde Estas Yolanda?" [China Forbes Vocals Version]	Pink Martini	Manuel Jiménez	A Retrospective	2011	
"Dosvedanya Mio Bombino"	Pink Martini	China Forbes; Maya Forbes	Hey Eugene!	2007	
"Du Soleil Plein Les Yeux (Eyes Full of Sun)"	Pink Martini and Saori Yuki	Catherine Desage; Frances Lai	1969	2011	
"Elohai, N'tzor"	Pink Martini	Danny Maseng	Joy to the World	2010	
"Everywhere"	Pink Martini	China Forbes; Thomas Lauderdale	Hey Eugene!	2007	
"The Flying Squirrel"	Pink Martini	Thomas Lauderdale; Robert Taylor	Discover the World: Live in Concert	2009	
"The Gardens of Sampson & Beasley"	Pink Martini	China Forbes; Thomas Lauderdale	Hang On Little Tomato	2004	
"Hey Eugene"	Pink Martini	China Forbes	Hey Eugene!	2007	
"How Long Will It Last?"	Pink Martini featuring Michael Feinstein	Max Lief; Joseph Meyer	A Retrospective	2011	
"Ii Janaino Shiawase Naraba (It's Okay If I'm Happy)"	Pink Martini and Saori Yuki	Tokiko Iwatani; Taku Izumi	1969	2011	
"Is That All There Is?"	Pink Martini and Saori Yuki	Rena Connor; Yoshia Kurosaki; Thomas Lauderdale; Jerry Leiber; Tadashi Nagoi; Camellia Nieh; Satomi Sano; Mike Stoller; Masumi Timson; Stephen Timson; Mas Yatabe	1969	2011	
"Kikuchiyo to Mohshimasu"	Pink Martini	Yoichi Suzuki; Michio Yamazaki	Hang On Little Tomato	2004	
"Kikuchiyo to Mohshimasu" [The Hiroshi Wada Mix]	Pink Martini	Yoichi Suzuki; Michio Yamazaki	A Retrospective	2011	
"Kisetsu no Ashioto (Footsteps of the Seasons)"	Pink Martini and Saori Yuki	Yasushi Akimoto; Hitoshi Haba	1969	2011	
"La Soledad"	Pink Martini	Frédéric Chopin; Thomas Lauderdale; Pepe Raphael	Sympathique	1997	
"La Vergine Degli Angeli"	Pink Martini featuring the Pacific Youth Choir	Francesco Maria Piave; Giuseppe Verdi	Joy to the World	2010	
"Let's Never Stop Falling in Love"	Pink Martini	China Forbes; Thomas Lauderdale	Hang On Little Tomato	2004	
"Lilly"	Pink Martini	China Forbes; Thomas Lauderdale	Hang On Little Tomato	2004	
"Little Drummer Boy"	Pink Martini	Katherine Kennicott Davis; Henry Onorati; Harry Simeone	Joy to the World	2010	
"Lullaby"	Pink Martini	China Forbes; Thomas Lauderdale	Sympathique	1997	
"Ma Solitude"	Pink Martini featuring Georges Moustaki	Georges Moustaki	A Retrospective	2011	
"Malagueña"	Pink Martini	Ernesto Lecuona	Discover the World: Live in Concert	2009	
"The Man with the Big Sombrero"	Pink Martini	Phil Boutelje; Foster Carling	A Retrospective	2011	
"Mar Desconocido"	Pink Martini	Frédéric Chopin; Martín Zarzar	Hey Eugene!	2007	
"Mas que Nada"	Pink Martini and Saori Yuki	Jorge Ben; Fumio Nagata	1969	2011	
"Mayonaka no Bossa Nova (Midnight Bossa Nova)"	Pink Martini and Saori Yuki	Jun Hashimoto; Kyohei Tsutumi	1969	2011	
"Moon River"	Pink Martini featuring Gus Van Sant	Henry Mancini; Johnny Mercer	A Retrospective	2011	
"Never on Sunday"	Pink Martini	Manos Hatzidakis	Sympathique	1997	
"New Amsterdam"	Pink Martini	Moondog	Splendor in the Grass	2009	
"Ninna nanna"	Pink Martini	Massimo Audiello; Alba Clemente	Splendor in the Grass	2009	
"Ninna nanna" [Reprise]	Pink Martini	Massimo Audiello; Alba Clemente	Splendor in the Grass	2009	
"No Hay Problema"	Pink Martini	Jacques Marray	Sympathique	1997	
"Ocho Kandelikas (Eight Little Candles)"	Pink Martini	Flory Jagoda	Joy to the World	2010	
"Ohayoo Ohio (Hello Ohio)"	Pink Martini	Dan Faehnle	Splendor in the Grass	2009	
"Ojala"	Pink Martini	China Forbes; Thomas Lauderdale; Daniel Lemay; Timothy Nishimoto; Luisa Quiñoy	Hey Eugene!	2007	
"Où est ma tête?"	Pink Martini	China Forbes; Thomas Lauderdale; Alex Marashian	Splendor in the Grass	2009	
"Over the Valley"	Pink Martini	China Forbes; Thomas Lauderdale	Splendor in the Grass	2009	
"Piensa en mí"	Pink Martini featuring Chavela Vargas	Agustín Lara; Maria Teresa Lara	Splendor in the Grass	2009	
"Puff, the Magic Dragon"	Pink Martini and Saori Yuki	Leonard Lipton; Akira Nogami; Peter Yarrow	1969	2011	
"Que Sera Sera"	Pink Martini	Jay Livingston; Ray Evans	Sympathique	1997	
"Santa Baby"	Pink Martini	Joan Javits; Philip Springer	Joy to the World	2010	
"Shchedryk (Ukrainian Bell Carol)"	Pink Martini featuring the Pacific Youth Choir	Mykola Leontovych	Joy to the World	2010	
"Silent Night"	Pink Martini featuring the Portland Boychoir	Franz Xaver Gruber; Joseph Mohr; John Freeman Young	Joy to the World	2010	
"Sing"	Pink Martini featuring Emilio Delgado	Joe Raposo	Splendor in the Grass	2009	
"A Snowglobe Christmas"	Pink Martini	China Forbes; Thomas Lauderdale	Joy to the World	2010	
"Song of the Black Lizard"	Pink Martini	Akihiro Miwa	Sympathique	1997	
"Song of the Black Swan (O canto do cysne negro)"	Pink Martini	Heitor Villa-Lobos	Hang On Little Tomato	2004	
"Splendor in the Grass"	Pink Martini	Thomas Lauderdale; Alex Marashian; Pyotr Ilyich Tchaikovsky	Splendor in the Grass	2009	
"Sunday Table"	Pink Martini	China Forbes; Thomas Lauderdale	Splendor in the Grass	2009	
"Sympathique"	Pink Martini	China Forbes; Thomas Lauderdale	Sympathique	1997	
"Syracuse"	Pink Martini	Bernard Dimey; Henri Salvador	Hey Eugene!	2007	
"Taya Tan"	Pink Martini	Taku Izumi; Michio Yamagami	Hey Eugene!	2007	
"Tea for Two"	Pink Martini featuring Little Jimmy Scott	Irving Caesar; Vincent Youmans	Hey Eugene!	2007	
"Tempo Perdido"	Pink Martini	Ataulfo Alves	Hey Eugene!	2007	
"Tuca tuca"	Pink Martini	Gianni Boncompagni; Franco Pisano	Splendor in the Grass	2009	
"U Plavu Zoru"	Pink Martini	Gavin Bondy; David Eby; China Forbes; Thomas Lauderdale; Derek Rieth; Robert Taylor; John Wager	Hang On Little Tomato	2004	
"Una Notte a Napoli"	Pink Martini	Alba Clemente; Johnny Dynell; China Forbes; Thomas Lauderdale	Hang On Little Tomato	2004	
"Una Notte a Napoli" [DJ Johnny Dynall Remix]	Pink Martini	Alba Clemente; Johnny Dynell; China Forbes; Thomas Lauderdale	A Retrospective	2011	
"Una Notte a Napoli" [First Recording]	Pink Martini	Alba Clemente; Johnny Dynell; China Forbes; Thomas Lauderdale	A Retrospective	2011	
"Veronique"	Pink Martini	Thomas Lauderdale; Gregory Tozian	Hang On Little Tomato	2004	
"Wasuretainoni (I Want to Forget You, But...)"	Pink Martini and Saori Yuki	Larry Kolber; Barry Mann; Terunobo Okuyama	1969	2011	
"Watashi mo Anata to Naite Ii? (Consolation)"	Pink Martini and Saori Yuki	Go Misawa	1969	2011	
"We Three Kings"	Pink Martini	John Henry Hopkins, Jr.	Joy to the World	2010	
"White Christmas"	Pink Martini	Irving Berlin	Joy to the World	2010	
"White Christmas, Pt. 2"	Pink Martini featuring Saori Yuki	Irving Berlin; Tatsuro Yamashita	Joy to the World	2010	
"Yoake No Scat (Melody for a New Dawn)"	Pink Martini and Saori Yuki	Taku Izumi; Michio Yamagami	1969	2011	
"Yuuzuki (Evening Moon)"	Pink Martini and Saori Yuki	Rei Nakanishi; Miki Takahashi	1969	2011	
