= Pink Martini discography =

Pink Martini discography contains all works associated with the American band Pink Martini across a range of genres and styles.

List of studio albums, with selected chart positions
Title	Album details	Peak chart positions								Sales
Title	Album details	US	BEL	CAN	FRA	NLD	SPA	SWI	UK	Sales
Sympathique	Released: November 11, 1997	—	33	—	30	—	—	56	—	US: 218,000
Hang On Little Tomato	Released: October 19, 2004	122	52	—	12	—	—	25	198	
Hey Eugene!	Released: May 15, 2007	30	52	10	7	64	43	15	47	US: 140,000
Splendor in the Grass	Released: October 27, 2009	45	70	13	28	—	31	50	80	US: 12,000
Joy to the World	Released: November 16, 2010	35	—	10	103	—	91	—	200	US: 136,000
Get Happy	Released: September 24, 2013	48	43	15	36	—	34	67	76	
Je dis oui!	Released: November 18, 2016	193	108	99	96	—	—	76	—	
"—" denotes a recording that did not chart or was not released in that territory.

== Collaboration studio albums ==
List of collaboration studio albums, with selected chart positions
Title	Album details	Peak chart positions				
Title	Album details	US	BEL	CAN	FRA	JPN
1969	With Saori Yuki; Released: October 12, 2011	—	—	64	—	4
Dream a Little Dream	With The von Trapps; Released: March 4, 2014	115	149	21	144	—

== Compilation albums ==
List of compilation albums, with selected chart positions
Title	Album details	Peak chart positions			Sales
Title	Album details	FRA	SPA	SWI	Sales
A Retrospective	Released: September 26, 2011	87	43	77	

== Singles ==
Year	Title	Peak positions		Certification
Year	Title	BEL (WA)	FRA	Certification
2000	"Sympathique (Je ne veux pas travailler)"	3	17	

== DVD ==
- 2009 : Discover the World: Live in Concert (DVD)
