= A Retrospective (Pink Martini album) =

2011 compilation album by Pink Martini

Compilation album by Pink Martini
- Released: September 26, 2011 (UK)
- Genres: Easy listening, pop rock
- Length: 72:02
- Labels: Heinz, Inertia

Pink Martini chronology
Joy to the World (2010)	A Retrospective (2011)	1969 (2011)

A Retrospective is the first compilation album by the American group Pink Martini, released in September 2011 in the United Kingdom and the following month in the United States, Australia and Canada. The album contains twenty-one tracks from six studio albums. Guest artists include Michael Feinstein ("How Long Will It Last?"), French singer and songwriter Georges Moustaki ("Ma Solitude") and director Gus Van Sant ("Moon River"); the compilation also features remixes by New York City disc jockey Johnny Dynell ("Una Notte a Napoli") and Hiroshi Wada ("Kikuchiyo to Mohshimasu").

Critical reception of the compilation album was positive overall; many reviewers appreciated the album in its entirety but criticized select tracks. A Retrospective reached a peak position of number seven on Billboard's Top Jazz Albums chart.

== Composition ==
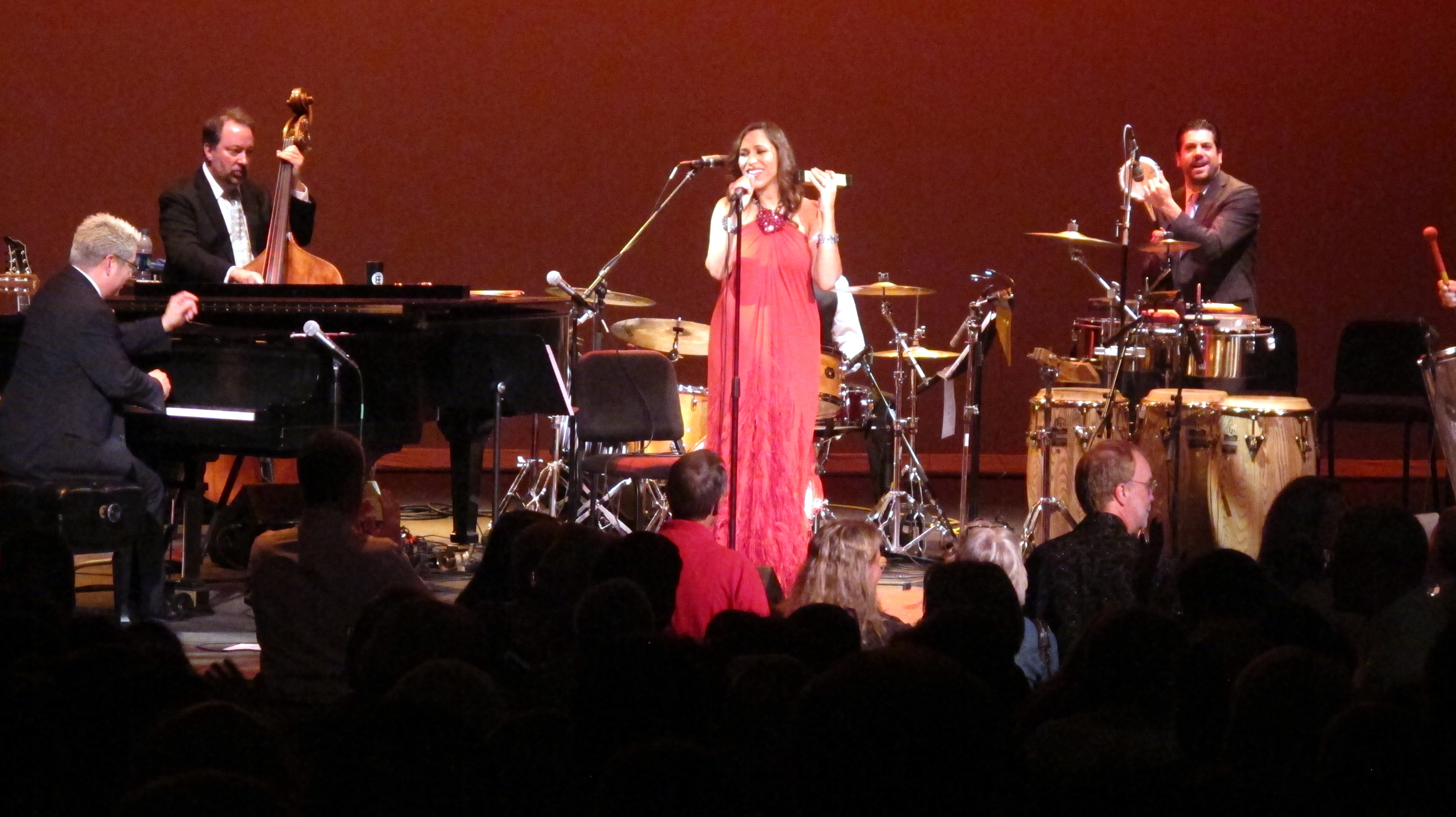
Pink Martini performing in 2012

A Retrospective contains twenty-one tracks totaling more than seventy minutes in length, some of which were previously unreleased. Tracks originally appearing on the group's 1997 debut album Sympathique include Manuel Jiménez's "¿Donde Estas Yolanda?", "La Soledad", "Sympathique", "Que Sera Sera" by Ray Evans and Jay Livingston, and "Amado Mio". "Hang On Little Tomato", "Una Notte a Napoli", "Anna (El Negro Zumbón)", "Lilly" and "Aspettami" first appeared on Hang On Little Tomato (2004). The group's 2007 album Hey Eugene! included the song of the same name; similarly, "Splendor in the Grass" was the title track of the 2009 album of the same name. The samba-influenced version of "Auld Lang Syne" was the final track on Pink Martini's 2010 holiday album Joy to the World. 1969, the collaborative album with Saori Yuki first released in October 2011, included Jorge Ben Jor's "Mas que Nada".

"Moon River", originally by Henry Mancini and Johnny Mercer, and "The Man with the Big Sombrero" were previously unreleased. "Moon River" featured guest vocals by director Gus Van Sant, marking his singing debut. French singer-songwriter Georges Moustaki provided vocals on "Ma Solitude", and pianist and singer Michael Feinstein contributed to Max Lief and Joseph Meyer's "How Long Will It Last?" The compilation also features two remixed recordings: "Una Notte a Napoli" by New York City disc jockey Johnny Dynell, and an instrumental version of "Kikuchiyo to Mohshimasu" by Hiroshi Wada. "Kikuchiyo to Mohshimasu" originally appeared on Hang On Little Tomato.

Included with the album is a 48-page booklet of previously unseen Polaroid pictures taken by Thomas Lauderdale, along with postcards and posters from Pink Martini's history. A deluxe hardbound CD book version was also available for purchase. The group promoted the release of A Retrospective and 1969 by touring throughout the United States, including a holiday special in Portland, Oregon featuring Saori Yuki as part of their Holiday Tour.

== Reception ==
Professional ratings
Review scores
Source	Rating
Rave	3/4 stars
The New Zealand Herald	3.5/5 stars

Overall, critical reception of the album was positive, though some reviewers criticized select tracks. Michael Upchurch of The Seattle Times wrote that the "A" before "Retrospective" in the album's title was appropriate and that the compilation included highlights of the group's career. The New Zealand Herald's Lydia Jenkin thought the collection represented a standard Pink Martini concert set list by including a variety of sounds, languages and vocalists, each delivered with "class, passion and subtlety". Jenkin awarded the album 3.5 of 5 stars, complimenting the album overall but noting that some tracks featured less "elegant sophistication" or "imaginative" arrangements. Marion Pragt wrote a positive review for The Cambridge Student, believing the compilation incorporated various styles of music and reflected the group's "cosmopolitan nature". Pragt concluded by asserting that the album was "perfect for avid admirers and newcomers alike".

Rave magazine's Chad Parkhill rated the album three of four stars. Parkhill described "Auld Lang Syne" as "weirdly off-kilter" and found Dynell's remix to be "profoundly derivative", but also called some of the previously unreleased material "wonderful". Tom D'Antoni of Oregon Music News called Van Sant's performance "truly awful in execution", but considered the album to be "simply sensational" overall. The Sydney Star Observer's Nick Bond complimented the album's artwork and packaging.

== Track listing ==
No.	Title	Writer(s)	Length
1.	"Una Notte a Napoli" (First Recording)	Alba Clemente, Johnny Dynell, China Forbes, Thomas Lauderdale	2:27
2.	"Hang On Little Tomato"	Patrick Abbey, Forbes, Lauderdale	3:17
3.	"¿Donde Estas Yolanda?" (China Forbes Vocals Version)	Manuel Jiménez	3:25
4.	"Hey Eugene"	Forbes	3:09
5.	"La Soledad"	Frédéric Chopin, Lauderdale, Pepe Raphael	5:38
6.	"Splendor in the Grass"	Lauderdale, Alex Marashian	3:37
7.	"Kikuchiyo to Mohshimasu" (The Hiroshi Wada Mix)	Yoichi Suzuki, Michio Yamagami	4:32
8.	"Anna (El Negro Zumbón)"	Francesco Giordano, Roman Vatro	2:37
9.	"Ma Solitude" (featuring Georges Moustaki)	Georges Moustaki	3:27
10.	"Mas que Nada" (featuring Saori Yuki)	Jorge Ben Jor	2:35
11.	"Sympathique"	Forbes, Lauderdale	2:47
12.	"Lilly"	Forbes, Lauderdale	2:43
13.	"How Long Will It Last?" (featuring Michael Feinstein) (from the 1931 film Possessed)	Max Lief, Joseph Meyer	4:06
14.	"Tuca Tuca"	Gianni Boncompagni, Franco Pisano	2:49
15.	"Que Sera Sera"	Ray Evans, Jay Livingston	4:10
16.	"Moon River" (featuring Gus Van Sant)	Henry Mancini, Johnny Mercer	1:24
17.	"Amado Mio"	Doris Fisher, Allan Roberts	4:47
18.	"The Man with the Big Sombrero" (from the 1943 film Hi Diddle Diddle)	Phil Boutelje, Foster Carling	1:32
19.	"Aspettami" (First Recording)	Forbes, Lauderdale	2:50
20.	"Auld Lang Syne"	Robert Burns, Dirgham Sbait, Jacques Sevin, traditional	3:21
21.	"Una Notte a Napoli" (DJ Johnny Dynall Remix)	Clemente, Dynell, Forbes, Lauderdale	6:50

Track listing adapted from Allmusic.

== Personnel ==
- Patrick Abbey – composer
- Keiko Araki – violin
- Jennifer Arnold – viola
- Eric Asakawa – choir, chorus
- Kazunori Asano – acoustic guitar, ukulele
- Phil Baker – double bass, sitar
- Joël Belgique – viola
- Jorge Ben Jor – composer
- Lauren Berg – choir, chorus
- Heather Blackburn – cello
- Gianni Boncompagni – composer
- Gavin Bondy – choir, chorus, trumpet, vocals
- Phil Boutelje – composer
- Edith Bradway – violin
- Robert Burns – composer
- Brandyn Callahan – choir, chorus
- Luis Candido – cavaquinho
- João Canziani – cover photo
- Foster Carling – composer
- Pansy Chang – cello
- Joe Chiccarelli – mixing
- Frédéric Chopin – composer
- Alba Clemente – composer, narrator
- Julie Coleman – violin
- Tim Cooper – surdo
- Noah Cotter – choir, chorus
- Nicholas Crosa – soloist, violin
- Drew Danin – tamborim
- Brian Davis – choir, chorus, conga, cuica, direction, drums, maracas, percussion, repenique, shaker, surdo, vocals
- Ami Davolt – violin
- Daniel Dempsey – choir, chorus
- Esteban Diaz – caixa
- Johnny Dynell – composer, remixing
- David Eby – cello
- Stephen Echlemann – choir, chorus
- Adam Esbensen – cello
- Ray Evans – composer
- Gregory Ewer – violin
- Joy Fabos – violin
- Dan Faehnle – electric guitar, guitar
- Michael Feinstein – vocals
- Doris Fisher – composer
- China Forbes – composer, tambourine, vocals
- Dave Friedlander – engineer, mixing
- Jeramie Gajan – choir, chorus
- Forrest Gamba – choir, chorus
- David Gerhards – choir, chorus
- Francesco Giordano – composer
- Randall Givens – caixa
- Jeremy Gordon – surdo
- Paloma Griffin – violin
- Luise Gruber – violin
- Bernie Grundman – mastering
- Kassandra Haddock – choir, chorus
- Tracey Harris – soloist, backing vocals
- Tadashi Hashimoto –assistant engineer
- Elena Hess – choir, chorus
- Mike Horsfall – vibraphone
- Kathleen Hunt – caixa
- Alex Hutchinson – design
- Jun Iwasaki – violin
- John Jenness – caixa
- Tim Jensen – flute
- Manuel Jiménez – composer
- Adam Johnson – choir, chorus
- Taylor Johnson –choir, chorus
- Anthony Jones – drums
- Justin Kagan – cello
- Shauna Keyes – viola
- Matthew Krane –choir, chorus
- Thomas Lauderdale – arranger, choir, chorus, composer, fender rhodes, keyboards, photography, piano, vocals
- Norman Leyden – clarinet
- Max Lief – composer
- Jay Livingston – composer
- Maureen Love – harp
- Henry Mancini – composer
- Alex Marashian – composer
- Johnny Mercer – composer
- Aaron Meyer – violin
- Joseph Meyer – composer
- Georges Moustaki – composer, guitar, vocals
- Jay Mower – tamborim
- Calvin Multanen – choir, chorus
- Luke Multanen – choir, chorus
- Osao Murata – organ
- Ara Nelson – tamborim
- Timothy Nishimoto – backing vocals, choir, chorus, shaker, vocals
- Charles Noble – viola
- Audrey Overby – choir, chorus
- Franco Pisano – composer
- Chelsea Plaskitt – choir, chorus
- Pete Plympton – engineer
- Pepe Raphael – composer, vocals
- Derek Rieth – bongos, choir, chorus, percussion, shaker, surdo, tambourine, timpani
- Allan Roberts – composer
- Richard Rothfus – bongos, drums, percussion, shaker, vocals
- Mia Hall Savage – direction
- Dr. Dirgham Sbait – adaptation, assistant, composer
- Lauren Searls – choir, chorus
- Peter Sellers – sitar
- Pauline Serrano – chocalhos
- Jacques Sevin – composer
- Doris Smith – backing vocals
- Doug Smith – choir, chorus, claves, cymbals, drums, guiro, percussion, shaker, timbales, vibraphone, vocals
- Theresa Stahl – viola
- Clark Stiles – engineer
- Yoichi Suzuki – composer
- Courtney Taylor-Taylor – electric guitar
- Robert Taylor – choir, chorus, trombone, trumpet, vocals
- Jayson Thoming-Gale – tamborim
- Masumi Timson – koto
- Yumi Torimaru – tamborim
- Duncan Tuomi – choir, chorus
- Devin Van Hine – choir, chorus
- Gus Van Sant – vocals
- Roman Vatro – composer
- Inés Voglar – violin
- Skip vonKuske – cello
- Hiroshi Wada – slide guitar
- John Wager – bass
- Jessica Wasko – choir, chorus
- Michio Yamagami – composer
- Teruo Yamaguchi – engineer
- Saori Yuki – vocals
- Martín Zarzar – bongos, choir, chorus, cymbals, drums, percussion

Credits adapted from Allmusic

== Charts ==
A Retrospective reached a peak positive of number seven on Billboard's Top Jazz Albums chart.

Chart (2011)	Peak position
U.S. Billboard Top Jazz Albums	7

In 2014 it was awarded a double silver certification from the Independent Music Companies Association, which indicated sales of at least 40,000 copies throughout Europe.

== Release history ==
Region	Date	Format
United Kingdom	September 6, 2011	CD
United States	November 1, 2011	CD
Australia	November 11, 2011	CD
Canada	November 15, 2011	CD

Release history adapted from Pink Martini's official website

== See also ==
- Michael Feinstein discography
