= Thomas Lauderdale Meets the Pilgrims =

Studio album by Thomas Lauderdale
- Label: Heinz

Thomas Lauderdale Meets the Pilgrims is a studio album by Thomas Lauderdale and the surf group Satan's Pilgrims, released by Heinz Records in May 2023.

== Promotion ==
" Night and Day" was released as a single in March 2023. An album release party will be held at Portland's Crystal Ballroom on May 18, 2023.
