= Hey Eugene! =

Studio album by Pink Martini
- Released: May 15, 2007
- Recorded: December 2005 – December 2006
- Studio: Kung Fu Bakery (Portland, Oregon)
- Genres: Alternative pop; world; Latin; jazz
- Length: 45:13
- Label: Heinz
- Producers: Thomas M. Lauderdale; China Forbes; Phil Baker

Pink Martini chronology
Hang On Little Tomato (2004)	Hey Eugene! (2007)	Splendor in the Grass (2009)

Professional ratings
Review scores
Source	Rating
AllMusic	4.5/5 stars
BBC Music	Positive
LiveDaily	Positive

Hey Eugene! is the third studio album by American band Pink Martini, released on May 15, 2007, by Pink Martini's own record label, Heinz Records. The album is named after the track "Hey Eugene", a fan favorite at the band's live concerts. As with most Pink Martini albums, Hey Eugene! features lyrics in several languages: French, Portuguese, Spanish, Japanese, Russian, Arabic, and English. The song "Bukra wba'do", meaning "tomorrow and the day after" in Arabic, describes a lover's anticipation of a first date.

== Commercial performance ==
Hey Eugene! debuted at number 30 on the US Billboard 200, selling 19,000 copies in its first week. As of 2009, 140,000 copies have been sold in the United States, according to Nielsen SoundScan. In 2014 it was awarded a diamond certification from the Independent Music Companies Association, denoting sales in excess of 200,000 copies across Europe. According to Pink Martini, the album has sold more than 350,000 copies worldwide.

== Track listing ==
No.	Title	Lyrics	Music	Length
1.	"Everywhere"	China Forbes; Thomas M. Lauderdale	C. Forbes; Lauderdale	3:10
2.	"Tempo Perdido"	Ataulfo Alves	Alves	3:40
3.	"Mar Desconocido"	Martín Zarzar	Zarzar	3:09
4.	"Taya Tan" (Saori Yuki cover, 1971)	Michio Yamagami	Taku Izumi	2:39
5.	"City of Night"	C. Forbes; Lauderdale	C. Forbes; Lauderdale	4:16
6.	"Ojalá"	Lauderdale; Luisa Quiñoy; Timothy Nishimoto; Daniel Lemay; C. Forbes	Lauderdale; Luisa Quiñoy; Timothy Nishimoto; Daniel Lemay; C. Forbes	2:59
7.	"Bukra Wba'do" (Abdel Halim Hafez cover, 1998)	Fatehi Qorah	Mounir Mourad	3:52
8.	"Cante e Dance"	Phil Baker	Baker	4:25
9.	"Hey Eugene"	C. Forbes	C. Forbes	3:06
10.	"Syracuse"	Bernard Dimey	Henri Salvador	3:46
11.	"Dosvedanya Mio Bombino"	C. Forbes; Maya Forbes	C. Forbes; M. Forbes	4:41
12.	"Tea for Two" (With Jimmy Scott)	Irving Caesar	Vincent Youmans	5:02

=== Notes ===
- "Mar Desconocido" includes an excerpt of "Waltz in C#-minor" by Frédéric Chopin.
- "Dosvedanya Mio Bombino" includes an excerpt of "The Happy Wanderer" by Friedrich-Wilhelm Möller.

== Personnel ==
- China Forbes, vocals
- Timothy Nishimoto, vocals & percussion
- Gavin Bondy, trumpet
- Robert Taylor, trombone & trumpet
- Nicholas Crosa, violin
- Paloma Griffin, violin
- Pansy Chang, cello
- Brant Taylor, cello
- Dan Faehnle, guitar
- Phil Baker, guitar & upright bass
- Maureen Love, harp
- Brian Davis, congas & percussion
- Derek Rieth, congas & percussion
- Martín Zarzar, cavaquinho, drums & percussion
- Thomas Lauderdale, piano

With Jimmy Scott ("Tea for Two"), the David York Ensemble ("Syracuse"), The Jefferson High School Gospel Choir ("Tempo Perdido"), the MarchFourth Marching Band ("Dosvedanya Mio Bombino"), and the Harvey Rosencrantz Orchestra ("Everywhere", "Syracuse")

== Charts ==
=== Weekly charts ===
Weekly chart performance for Hey Eugene!
Chart (2007)	Peak position
Belgian Albums (Ultratop Flanders)	64
Belgian Albums (Ultratop Wallonia)	52
Canadian Albums (Billboard)	10
Dutch Albums (Album Top 100)	64
French Albums (SNEP)	7
Greek Albums (IFPI)	1
Italian Albums (FIMI)	35
Scottish Albums (Official Charts)	61
Spanish Albums (Promusicae)	43
Swiss Albums (Schweizer Hitparade)	15
UK Albums (Official Charts)	47
US Billboard 200	30
US Independent Albums (Billboard)	2
US Top Jazz Albums (Billboard)	2

=== Year-end charts ===
2007 year-end chart performance for Hey Eugene!
Chart (2007)	Position
French Albums (SNEP)	75
US Top Jazz Albums (Billboard)	8

2008 year-end chart performance for Hey Eugene!
Chart (2008)	Position
US Top Jazz Albums (Billboard)	12

== Certifications ==
Sales certifications for Hey Eugene!
Region	Certification	Certified units/sales
Turkey (Mü-Yap)	Platinum	10,000^{*}
United States	—	140,000
^{*} Sales figures based on certification alone.
