= Sympathique =

Studio album by Pink Martini
- Released: November 11, 1997
- Recorded: December 1996 – April 1997
- Studios: Stiles Recording Studio (Portland, Oregon)
- Genres: Alternative pop; world; Latin; jazz
- Length: 47:40
- Label: Heinz

Pink Martini chronology
Sympathique (1997)	Hang on Little Tomato (2004)

Professional ratings
Review scores
Source	Rating
Allmusic	3/5 stars

Sympathique is the first studio album by the American band Pink Martini. It was released on November 11, 1997, by the band's own record label, Heinz Records. As of 2013, it had sold over one million copies worldwide.

The first single, "Sympathique", was released in 1997 and was nominated as "Song of the Year" at the Victoires de la Musique Awards in France. The album has been certified Platinum in France and Greece and Gold in Canada, Switzerland, and Turkey.

== 20th Anniversary Edition ==
In 2018, Sympathique: 20th Anniversary Edition was released by Heinz Records and its global licensees. Pink Martini's arrangement of Maurice Ravel's "Boléro" had been on the original release of "Sympathique" (track 9), but was removed from the album in subsequent reissues due to a legal dispute with the Ravel estate. With the work now in the public domain, the song was added back to the album for the 20th Anniversary Edition.

There are some name changes for the 20th Anniversary Edition. "Sympathique" (track 3) was renamed "Sympathique (Je ne veux pas travailler)". "Never on Sunday" was renamed "Children of the Piraeus". "Brazil" was renamed "Brasil".

== Track listing ==
No.	Title	Writer(s)	Length
1.	"Amado Mio"	Doris Fisher, Allan Roberts	4:51
2.	"No Hay Problema"	Jacques Marray	6:14
3.	"Sympathique"	China Forbes, Thomas Lauderdale	2:50
4.	"Qué Sera Sera"	Jay Livingston, Ray Evans	4:12
5.	"La Soledad"	Pepe Raphael, Lauderdale, Frédéric Chopin	5:41
6.	"¿Dónde Estás, Yolanda?"	Manuel Jiménez	3:25
7.	"Andalucia"	Ernesto Lecuona	3:41
8.	"Song of the Black Lizard" (From the film Black Lizard)	Akihiro Miwa	4:12
9.	"Boléro"	Maurice Ravel	6:10
10.	"Never on Sunday" (From the film Never on Sunday)	Manos Hadjidakis, Billy Towne	4:58
11.	"Brazil"	Ary Barroso	5:24
12.	"Lullaby"	Forbes, Lauderdale	2:12

- Some pressings of the album include "Donde Estas, Yolanda?" as performed by China Forbes instead of Pepe Raphael.
- "Bolero" is only available on the first pressing and the 20th Anniversary Edition.
- There are some name changes for the 20th Anniversary Edition. "Sympathique" (track 3) was renamed "Sympathique (Je ne veux pas travailler)". "Never on Sunday" was renamed "Children of the Piraeus". "Brazil" was renamed "Brasil".

== Lyrics ==
The first and second lines of the first verse and the first line of the chorus (″Je ne veux pas travailler″) of the song Sympathique are taken from Guillaume Apollinaire's poem ″Hôtel″ from Le guetteur mélancolique. The French composer Francis Poulenc used that poem as part of the lyrics for his 1940 composition Banalités, FP 107.

== Personnel ==
- China Forbes, vocals
- Pepe Raphael, vocals
- Gavin Bondy, trumpet
- Robert Taylor, trombone
- Aaron Meyer, violin
- David Eby, cello
- John Wager, bass
- Dan Faehnle, guitar
- Maureen Love, harp
- Doug Smith, vibes and percussion
- Richard Rothfus, bongos, drums, and percussion
- Brian Davis, congas, timbales & percussion
- Derek Rieth, congas & percussion
- Thomas Lauderdale, piano

== Certifications and sales ==
Certifications and sales for Sympathique
Region	Certification	Certified units/sales
Canada (Music Canada)	Gold	50,000^{^}
Greece (IFPI Greece)	Platinum	60,000^{^}
Switzerland (IFPI Switzerland)	Gold	25,000^{^}
Turkey (Mü-Yap)	Gold	5,000^{*}
United States	—	218,000
Summaries
Europe (IMPALA)	Platinum	500,000
^{*} Sales figures based on certification alone.^{^} Shipments figures based on certification alone.
