= Tempo Perdido =

"Tempo Perdido" (Portuguese for 'lost time') may refer to:

- "Tempo Perdido" (Ataulfo Alves song), a song by Brazilian singer-songwriter Ataulfo Alves, covered by various artists including Pink Martini
- "Tempo Perdido" (Legião Urbana song), a song by Brazilian rock band Legião Urbana from their 1986 album Dois
