= Dream a Little Dream (Pink Martini and the von Trapps album) =

Studio album by Pink Martini and the von Trapps
- Released: March 4, 2014
- Recorded: January–December 2013
- Length: 48:21
- Label: Heinz
- Producer: Dave Friedlander, Sofie von Trapp, August Von Trapp

Pink Martini chronology
Get Happy (2013)	Dream a Little Dream (2014)	Je dis oui! (2016)

Pink Martini collaboration albums chronology
1969 (2011)	Dream a Little Dream (2014)

Dream a Little Dream is a collaborative studio album by Pink Martini and the von Trapps, released by Heinz Records on March 4, 2014. Members of the von Trapps, a Portland-based group of descendants of the von Trapp family, include Sofia, Melanie, Amanda and August von Trapp. The album features guests Charmian Carr, Jack Hanna, The Chieftains and Wayne Newton. Three of the songs were written by August von Trapp. In 2014 it was awarded a silver certification from the Independent Music Companies Association, which indicated sales of at least 20,000 copies throughout Europe.

The title track, "Dream a Little Dream", appears in season 1, episode 5 of Netflix’s Chilling Adventures of Sabrina. Track 8, "In Stiller Nacht", appears in season 6, episode 5 of the crime drama, Better Call Saul.

== Track listing ==
1. "Storm"
2. "Kuroneko no tango"
3. "Dream a Little Dream"
4. "Fernando"
5. "Hayaldah hachi yafah bagan (The Prettiest Girl in the Kindergarten)"
6. "Friend"
7. "Die Dorfmusik (The Village Music)"
8. "In stiller Nacht (In the Still of the Night)"
9. "Le premier bonheur du jour (The first happiness of the day)"
10. "Rwanda nziza"
11. "Gong Xi"
12. "Hushabye Mountain"
13. "The Lonely Goatherd" (featuring Wayne Newton and Jack Hanna)
14. "Edelweiss" (featuring Charmian Carr)
15. "Thunder" (featuring The Chieftains)
