= Joy to the World (Pink Martini album) =

Studio album by Pink Martini
- Released: November 16, 2010
- Recorded: June 2006, May 2008, May–August 2010
- Genre: Christmas, jazz, world
- Length: 46:26
- Label: Heinz Records
- Producer: Pink Martini, Thomas M. Lauderdale

Pink Martini chronology
Splendor In The Grass (2009)	Joy to the World (2010)	A Retrospective (2011)

Professional ratings
Review scores
Source	Rating
Allmusic	4/5 stars

Joy to the World is the fifth studio album from the band Pink Martini. It was released on November 16, 2010 under the band's own label, Heinz Records. The album was recorded and mixed at Kung Fu Bakery in Portland, Oregon in May 2008 and from May–August 2010. Their rendition of "We Three Kings" was released as a Starbucks free download. In 2014 it was awarded a double silver certification from the Independent Music Companies Association, which indicated sales of at least 40,000 copies throughout Europe.

== Track listing ==
No.	Title	Writer(s)	Length
1.	"White Christmas"	Irving Berlin (1942)	2:11
2.	"White Christmas (Part II) (featuring Saori Yuki)" (in Japanese)	Berlin, translation by Tatsuro Yamashita	3.32
3.	"Schedryk (Ukrainian Bell Carol)"	Mykola Leontovych (1916)	3:00
4.	"Santa Baby"	Joan Javits, Philip Springer (1953)	2:37
5.	"Elohai, N'Tzor"	Danny Maseng (2003)	3:20
6.	"Little Drummer Boy"	Katherine Kennicott Davis (1941)	3:48
7.	"Congratulations (A Happy New Year Song)"	Chen Gexin (1945)	2:53
8.	"Do You Hear What I Hear?"	Noël Regney, Gloria Shayne (1962)	3:58
9.	"La Vergine Degli Angeli"	Giuseppe Verdi, Francesco Maria Piave (1862)	3:11
10.	"We Three Kings"	Traditional/Rev. John Henry Hopkins, Jr.	5:07
11.	"A Snowglobe Christmas"	Thomas Lauderdale, China Forbes	3:36
12.	"Ocho Kandelikas (Eight Little Candles)"	Flory Jagoda (1983)	2:17
13.	"Silent Night" (in German, Arabic, and English)	Joseph Mohr, Franz Xaver Gruber, John Freeman Young (1859)	3:38
14.	"Auld Lang Syne" (in English, Arabic, and French)	Traditional	3:18

== Charts ==
=== Charts ===
Chart (2010–11)	Peak position
US Billboard 200	35

=== Year-end charts ===
Chart (2011)	Position
Canadian Albums Chart	45

== Certifications and sales ==
Region	Certification	Certified units/sales
Canada (Music Canada)	Gold	40,000^{^}
United States	—	136,000
^{^} Shipments figures based on certification alone.
