= Harker Building =

Historic building in Portland, Oregon, U.S.

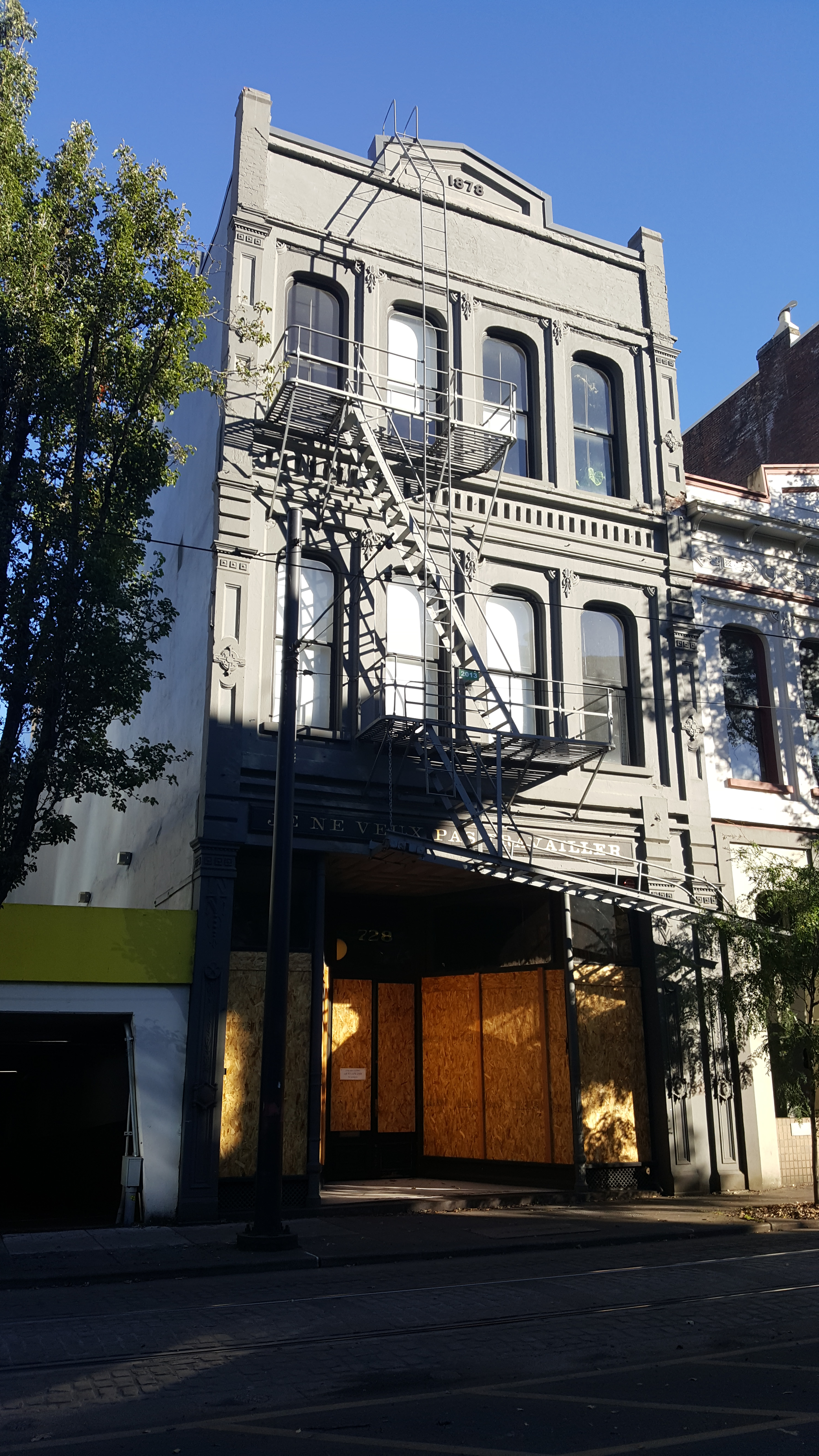
- The building's exterior in 2020
- Interactive map of the Harker Building area

General information
- Location: Portland, Oregon, United States
- Coordinates: 45°31′2.2″N 122°40′25.1″W

The Harker Building is a historical structure in southwest Portland, Oregon. The building was completed in 1878, and was soon occupied by the Oregon Conservatory of Music. A United Brethren congregation purchased the building in 1918 and created a Chinese Mission on the second level. Thomas Lauderdale purchased the building in 2001, after initially renting the space, and has since hosted many events. The phrase "Je ne veux pas travailler" is now written on the exterior. The cast-iron building has also been used by the Western Picture Frame Company and for Pink Martini rehearsals.
