= Gongxi Gongxi =

Mandarin Chinese New Year song

恭喜恭喜
English: Gongxi Gongxi
- Patriotic song of China
- Lyrics: Chen Gexin, 1945
- Music: Chen Gexin

Audio sample
- Original recording by Yao Lee: file; help

"Gongxi Gongxi" (Chinese: 恭喜恭喜; pinyin: Gōngxǐ gōngxǐ; lit. 'congratulations', 'congratulations'), mistranslated in public as "Wishing You Happiness and Prosperity" (which is the meaning of gōngxǐ fācái (恭喜發財)), is a popular Mandarin Chinese song and a Chinese New Year standard. Other English titles for the song include "Congratulations" and "Happiness To You".

== History ==
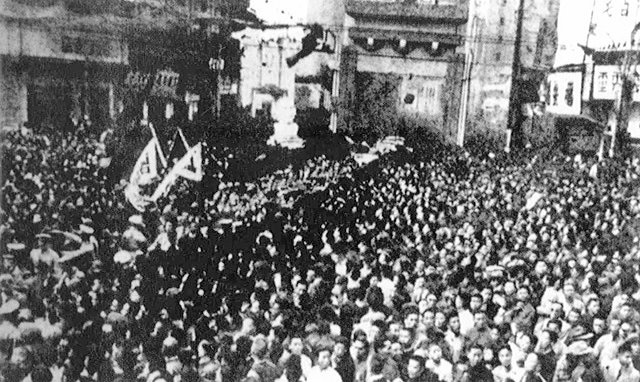
Chinese crowds in Shanghai celebrating Victory over Japan Day

The music and words of the song are both by Chen Gexin (under the pen name Qing Yu). It was written in Shanghai in 1945 to celebrate the defeat of Japan and liberation of China at the end of the Second Sino-Japanese War (World War II). The final lines of this song replicate the typical beat of the Chinese drum. An early popular recording of the song was by Yao Lee and her brother Yao Min.

Because its Mandarin title is also a common Chinese New Year greeting and the song celebrates the arrival of spring, it quickly became associated almost exclusively with New Year celebrations and remains a part of the season's musical canon. Contemporary versions of the song frequently appear on Chinese New Year musical collection albums, sometimes as electronic dance music performances and occasionally also feature lyrics in Taiwanese Hokkien and even English.

A more modern rendition of the song appeared on the 2002 China Dolls album 多一點點 – 小調大風行. This song was included in the Pink Martini Christmas album Joy to the World released in 2010, under the title "Congratulations - A Happy New Year Song" with vocals by China Forbes and Timothy Yuji Nishimoto. Khởi My sung a Vietnamese adaptation called Chúc Tết, and Xuân Mai also sung another Vietnamese adaptation called Chúc Xuân 1.

== Lyrics ==
Chinese lyrics	Hanyu Pinyin	English Translation
每條大街小巷， 每個人的嘴裡 見面第一句話， 就是恭喜恭喜 恭喜恭喜恭喜你呀， 恭喜恭喜恭喜你	Měitiáo dàjiē xiǎoxiàng, Měige rén dè zuǐlǐ Jiànmiàn dìyī jù huà, Jiùshì gōngxǐ gōngxǐ Gōngxǐ gōngxǐ gōngxǐ nǐ ya Gōngxǐ gōngxǐ gōngxǐ nǐ	On every street and in every lane, The first thing on everyone's tongue when they meet, is "congratulations." Congratulations, congratulations, congratulations to you Congratulations, congratulations, congratulations to you
冬天已到盡頭 真是好的消息 溫暖的春風 就要吹醒大地 恭喜恭喜恭喜你呀 恭喜恭喜恭喜你	Dōngtiān yǐ dào jìntóu, Zhēn shì hǎo de xiāoxī Wēnnuǎn de chūnfēng, Jiù yào chuī xǐng dàdì Gōngxǐ gōngxǐ gōngxǐ nǐ ya Gōngxǐ gōngxǐ gōngxǐ nǐ	Winter has come to an end, That is really good news, A warm spring breeze will awaken the earth. Congratulations, congratulations, congratulations to you Congratulations, congratulations, congratulations to you
浩浩冰雪融解, 眼看梅花吐蕊 漫漫長夜過去， 聽到一聲雞啼 恭喜恭喜恭喜你呀， 恭喜恭喜恭喜你	Hàohào bīngxuě róngjiě, Yǎn kàn méihuā tùruǐ Mànmàn chángyè guòqù, Tīngdào yīshēng jī tí Gōngxǐ gōngxǐ gōngxǐ nǐ ya Gōngxǐ gōngxǐ gōngxǐ nǐ	The icy snow has melted, See the plum tree blossom! The long night is past, I heard the rooster crow. Congratulations, congratulations, congratulations to you Congratulations, congratulations, congratulations to you
經過多少困難， 歷經多少磨練 多少心兒盼望， 盼望春的消息 恭喜恭喜恭喜你呀， 恭喜恭喜恭喜你	Jīngguò duōshǎo kùnnán, Lìjīng duōshǎo móliàn Duōshǎo xīn'ér pànwàng, Pànwàng chūn de xiāoxī Gōngxǐ gōngxǐ gōngxǐ nǐ ya Gōngxǐ gōngxǐ gōngxǐ nǐ	After experiencing so many difficulties, went through so many ordeals, How many hearts are looking forward To the news of Spring! Congratulations, congratulations, congratulations to you Congratulations, congratulations, congratulations to you

== See also ==
- Chinese New Year
- Music of China
