= Je dis oui! =

Studio album by Pink Martini
- Released: November 18, 2016
- Recorded: May – August 2016
- Length: 51:32
- Label: Heinz

Pink Martini chronology
Get Happy (2013)	Je dis oui! (2016)

Je dis oui! is an album by Pink Martini, released by Heinz Records on November 18, 2016. Guests vocalists include Ari Shapiro, Ikram Goldman, Kathleen Saadat, and Rufus Wainwright. The album was recorded at Kung Fu Bakery and B-Side Studios in Portland, Oregon. It was produced by Thomas Lauderdale and Kyle Mustain, and engineered by Dave Friedlander and Steve Sundholm.

== Track listing ==
1. "Joli garçon" (Bavo Defurne, China Forbes, Valentin Hadjadj, Thomas Lauderdale, Yves Verbraeken)
2. "The Butterfly Song" (Lauderdale, Alex Marashian)
3. "Kaj Kolah Khan" (Babak Afshar, Touradj Negahban)
4. "Ov Sirun Sirun" (Traditional)
5. "Love for Sale" (Cole Porter)
6. "Solidão" (Frederico de Brito, David Mourão Ferreira, Traditional, Ferrer Trindade)
7. "Al Bint Al Shalabiya" (Assi Rahbani, Mansour Rahbani)
8. "Souvenir" (Defurne, Lauderdale, Verbraeken)
9. "Aşkım Bahardı" (Yıldırım Gürses)
10. "Finnisma Di" (Lauderdale, Lyad Qasem, Pepe Raphael)
11. "Segundo" (Johnny Dynell, Forbes, Lauderdale)
12. "Blue Moon" (Lorenz Hart, Richard Rodgers)
13. "Fini la musique" (Defurne, Hadjadj, Lauderdale, Verbraeken)
14. "Pata Pata" (Miriam Makeba, Jerry Ragovoy)
15. "Serenade" (Franz Schubert)

== Charts ==
Chart (2016–17)	Peak position
Belgian Albums (Ultratop Flanders)	139
Belgian Albums (Ultratop Wallonia)	108
Canadian Albums (Billboard)	99
French Albums (SNEP)	109
Swiss Albums (Schweizer Hitparade)	76
US Billboard 200	193
