= Hey Eugene (song) =

"Hey Eugene!"

Song by Pink Martini

from the album Hey Eugene!
- Released: 2007
- Genre: Alternative pop
- Length: 3:10
- Songwriter: China Forbes

"Hey Eugene!" is a song performed by the band Pink Martini on their third full-length album Hey Eugene! released in 2007. The song was written by China Forbes and peaked at #53 in Switzerland in 2007.

The song was inspired by a boy China Forbes met at a party, who asked for her number and then never called.
