= Yao Min =

Yao Min 姚民
- Born: November 1917; Shanghai, China
- Origin: China
- Died: 30 March 1967 (aged 49) Hong Kong
- Genres: Pop
- Occupations: Songwriter, singer

Yao Min (Chinese: 姚敏; pinyin: Yáo Mǐn, born 姚民 Yáo Mín; November 1917 – 30 March 1967) was a Chinese popular music songwriter and singer and brother of Yao Lee. He was arguably one of the most prolific songwriters of the shidaiqu era in 1930s and 1940s Shanghai through the 1950s and 1960s in Hong Kong.

One of his perennial hits is "Wishing You Happiness and Prosperity" (恭喜恭喜). He wrote other early Chinese pop classics for singers such as his sister Yao Lee, Zhou Xuan, Li Xianglan, Bai Hong, and Bai Guang. His songs were often featured in popular movie musicals.
