= Splendor in the Grass (album) =

Studio album by Pink Martini
- Released: October 27, 2009
- Recorded: September 2008 – July 2009
- Genres: Alternative pop, World, Latin, Jazz
- Label: Heinz Records
- Producers: Thomas Lauderdale and China Forbes

Pink Martini chronology
Hey Eugene! (2007)	Splendor in the Grass (2009)	Joy to the World (2010)

Professional ratings
Review scores
Source	Rating
Allmusic (link)	4/5 stars
BBC Music (link)	(very positive)
The Daily Telegraph (link)	5/5 stars
The Guardian (link)	(positive)
The New Zealand Herald (link)	4/5 stars
The Oregonian (link)	(positive)
The Phoenix (link)	3/4 stars
PopMatters (link)	7/10 stars
The Sunday Times (link)	4/5 stars
The Times (link)	4/5 stars

Splendor in the Grass is the fourth full-length album from the band Pink Martini. It was released on October 27, 2009, on their own label Heinz Records.

The album is named after its third track, and features songs in five languages (English, Spanish, Italian, French, and Neapolitan). Collaborators included National Public Radio correspondent Ari Shapiro singing on the track "But Now I'm Back" and Sesame Street performer Emilio Delgado on a cover of Joe Raposo's "Sing". Other covers included on the album are "Piensa en mí", written by Agustín Lara and his sister Maria Teresa Lara for the 1948 film Revancha; "Tuca Tuca", originally performed by Raffaella Carrà; and the Moondog song "New Amsterdam".

The instrumental section of the title track, "Splendor in the Grass," from approximately 2:00 to approximately 2:55, is a rendition of the opening movement of Pyotr Ilyich Tchaikovsky's Piano Concerto No. 1 in B Flat Minor.

The album debuted at No. 45 on the Billboard 200 and No. 10 on the Top Independent Albums chart with 12,000 copies sold, according to Nielsen SoundScan. The album was certified platinum in Greece. In 2010. It was awarded a gold certification from the Independent Music Companies Association which indicated sales of at least 100,000 copies throughout Europe.

== Track listing ==
No.	Title	Composer	Length
1.	"Ninna nanna"	Alba Clemente, Massimo Audiello	4:42
2.	"Ohayoo Ohio (Hello Ohio)"	Dan Faehnle	4:47
3.	"Splendor in the Grass"	Alex Marashian, Thomas Lauderdale	3:40
4.	"Où est ma tête?" (Where Is My Head?)	Marashian, China Forbes, Lauderdale	4:12
5.	"And Then You're Gone"	Marashian, Derek Rieth, Forbes, Lauderdale	2:43
6.	"But Now I'm Back" (vocal by Ari Shapiro)	Marashian, Lauderdale	3:00
7.	"Sunday Table"	Forbes, Lauderdale	4:31
8.	"Over the Valley"	Forbes, Lauderdale	4:40
9.	"Tuca tuca" (cover of Raffaella Carrà, 1970)	Gianni Boncompagni, Franco Pisano	2:50
10.	"Bitty Boppy Betty"	Marashian	2:43
11.	"Sing" (vocal by Emilio Delgado)	Joe Raposo	4:10
12.	"Piensa en mí" (Vocal by Chavela Vargas)	Agustín Lara, Maria Teresa Lara	4:00
13.	"New Amsterdam" (cover of Moondog, 1994)	Moondog	4:51
14.	"Ninna nanna"	Audiello, Clemente	3:18

== Personnel ==
- Hugo Alfvén
- Neil Anderson - Choir, Chorus
- Jennifer Arnold - Viola
- Phil Baker - Guitar, Sitar, Bass
- John Bartley - Choir, Chorus
- Joel Belgique - Viola
- Christopher Benjamin - Choir, Chorus
- Heather Blackburn - Cello
- Gavin Bondy - Trumpet, Cornet, Alto Horn, Vocals, Piccolo Trumpet, Brass Arrangement
- Joe Bozzi - Mastering
- Karen Brooks - Toy Piano
- João Canziani - Cover Photo
- Pansy Chang - Cello
- Julie Coleman - Violin
- Nicholas Crosa - Violin
- Brian Davis - Percussion
- Emilio Delgado - Vocals
- Daniel Dempsey - Choir, Chorus
- Gregory Ewer - Violin
- Joy Fabos - Violin
- Dan Faehnle - Guitar
- China Forbes - Vocals
- Dave Friedlander - Engineer, Mixing
- Paloma Griffin - Violin
- Bernie Grundman - Mastering
- Doree Jarboe - Direction
- Timothy Jensen - Saxophone, Brass Arrangement, Saxophone Arrangement
- Ben Landsverk - Group
- Thomas Lauderdale - Piano, Producer, Photography
- Maureen Love - Harp
- Peter Murray - Photography
- Timothy Nishimoto - Percussion, Vocals
- Le Double Six de Portland: Catherine van der Salm, Stephanie Kramer, Margie Boulé, Katherine FitzGibbon, Jo Routh, Amy Russell, Cahen Taylor, Daniel Burnett, Barton Rippe, Kevin Walsh, Erik Hundtoft & Keenen Kemper
- Vocal arrangements by Rick Modlin
- Charles Noble - Viola
- Derek Rieth - Percussion
- Courtney Taylor-Taylor - guitar on "Splendor in the Grass"
- Salvador Tercero - Vocal Engineer
- Chavela Vargas - Vocals
- Martín Zarzar - Percussion, Vocals, Brass Arrangement

== Certifications ==
Certifications for Splendor in the Grass
Region	Certification	Certified units/sales
Greece (IFPI Greece)	Platinum	6,000^{^}
^{^} Shipments figures based on certification alone.
