= Mounir Mourad =

Egyptian artist (1922-1981)

Mounir Mourad منير مراد
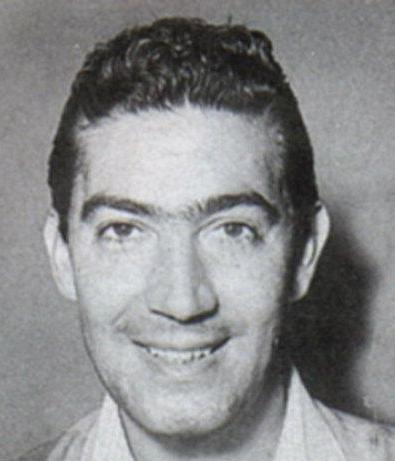
- Mounir Mourad

Background information
- Born: 13 January 1922; Cairo, Egypt
- Died: 17 October 1981 (aged 59) Cairo, Egypt

Mounir Mourad (Arabic: منير مراد, 13 January 1922 – 17 October 1981) was an Egyptian artist who has also wrote and composed film songs for famous stars such as Sharifa Fadel and Sabah, as well as duets for Egyptian actress Shadia and actor Abdel Halim Hafez. He played the leading roles in a few Egyptian films, the most famous being "Good Day" (Neharak Sa'id).

== Biography ==
Mourad was born in Cairo and grew up as the youngest of five children in a musical family. His father Zaki Mourad Mordechai was a famous Jewish Egyptian singer, musician and composer in the early 20th century. His mother was a Jewish Egyptian called Gamilah Ibrahim Roushou, the daughter of Ibrahim Roushou, a local concert contractor, who regularly booked Zaki Mourad to sing at concerts and wedding parties. When Mounir was growing up, his sister, the singer and actress Leila Mourad was already famous and singing on Egyptian radio.

In 1939, Mourad left his French college Collège des Frères (Bab al-Louq), took various jobs, and then entered the field of cinema, first as a script supervisor, and later as assistant director to Kamal Salim in about 24 films in the 1940s.

Mourad was one of the most popular composers of film songs of his time and composed music for several popular singers from Egypt in his personal style, often characterised by rapid rhythms. Among these was his music for the 1953 film Dahab, starring and directed by Egyptian actor Anwar Magdi, who was also his sister’s husband. He also composed the music score for the highly successful 1959 film The Unknown Woman directed by Mahmoud Zulfikar.

Mourad attempted to compose film music with Western influences, but faced difficulties to find a producer. His breakthrough, however, came when he composed his first popular song “One, Two” (“Wahed .. Etneen”) sung by Shadia. His association with popular actress and singer Shadia was a milestone in the history of Egyptian music, as their songs have become classic songs of romance. This opened the way for other singers and filmmakers to entrust him to compose songs for their movies.

Further, Mourad was a pioneer in dance music and musical shows. He composed and developed much of Egypt‘s famous dance music, performed by leading dancers of the time, such as Tahiya Karioka, Samia Gamal, and Naima Akef. In his autobiographical book about Mizrahi Jews, journalist Massoud Hayoon called him “a sort of Egyptian Gene Kelly“.

Mourad performed as actor, dancer and singer in three movies, among them Ana wa Habibi (My Love and I) with Shadia in 1953. In the 1950s, he married actress Soher Al Bably.

== Reception ==
On their 2007 album Hey Eugene!, American music group Pink Martini included their version of Mourad's song "Bukra w'bado" (Tomorrow and the day after), originally sung by Egyptian star Abdel Halim Hafez.
