= The von Trapps =

2001–2016 American musical group

- Origin: Kalispell, Montana, U.S.
- Genres: Folk; pop; classical
- Years active: 2001–2016
- Labels: Heinz; Rattlesby
- Members: Sofia von Trapp; Melanie von Trapp; Amanda von Trapp; August von Trapp

The Von Trapps (formerly The Von Trapp Children) was a musical group made up of Sofia, Melanie, Amanda, and August (formerly Justin) von Trapp, descendants of the original Trapp Family Singers. They are the children of Stefan and Annie von Trapp, grandchildren of Hedwig von Trapp, Johana von Trapp, Martina von Trapp, Agathe von Trapp, Maria Agatha Franziska Gorbetina "Mitzi" von Trapp, Rupert von Trapp and Werner von Trapp who was portrayed by Duane Chase as Kurt von Trapp in The Sound of Music, and the great-grandchildren of Georg Ritter von Trapp and his first wife Agathe Whitehead, and the step-great-grandchildren of Maria Augusta Kutschera von Trapp, Georg's second wife.

== History ==
The von Trapps began their singing career in 2001 after recording the folk songs taught to them by their grandfather Werner von Trapp. They subsequently toured North America, China, Southeast Asia including Philippines, and Europe for over 15 years. They frequently performed with the band Pink Martini, and their collaboration album, Dream a Little Dream, was released in March 2014.

The von Trapps appeared on The Oprah Winfrey Show, The View, Jack Hanna's Into the Wild, The Today Show and 19 Kids and Counting. In March 2016, The von Trapps announced that after 15 years of performing together, they would close the chapter in their lives as full-time musicians. Their last performance as a group, "Final Farewell Show", took place in their hometown of Portland, Oregon on May 3, 2016.

== Discography ==
=== Studio albums ===
Title	Album details
The von Trapp Children, Vol. 1	Released: January 28, 2003; Label: Rattlesby Records
Christmas with the von Trapp Children	Released: October 14, 2003; Label: Rattlesby Records
The von Trapp Children, Vol. 2	Released: September 28, 2004; Label: Rattlesby Records
Snow: New Songs of the Season	Released: November 1, 2007
A Cappella	Released: March 4, 2008; Label: Von Trapp J.A.M.S. Media

=== Collaboration studio albums ===
Title	Album details
Dream a Little Dream	With Pink Martini; Released: March 4, 2014; Label: Heinz Records

=== As featured artist ===
Title	Year	Album
"Kitty Come Home" (Pink Martini with Rufus Wainwright and the von Trapps)	2013	Get Happy
"Satellite of Love" (Storm Large with the von Trapps)	2014	Le Bonheur
"Stand up for Me" (Storm Large with the von Trapps)	2014	Le Bonheur

=== EPs ===
Title	Year	Album
Dancing in Gold	2014	Dancing in Gold: Released: April 14, 2015; Label: Heinz Records

=== DVD ===
Title	DVD details
Live in Concert	Released: September 1, 2008; Label: Von Trapp J.A.M.S. Media

== Awards ==
In 2006, the von Trapp Children were given the Special Award for Outstanding Young Family Singing Group at the 27th annual Young Artist Awards.
