= Hang On Little Tomato =

2004 studio album by Pink Martini

Studio album by Pink Martini
- Released: October 19, 2004
- Recorded: April 2001 – June 2004
- Studio: Kung Fu Bakery (Portland, Oregon)
- Genres: Alternative pop; world; Latin; jazz
- Length: 50:22
- Label: Heinz
- Producers: Thomas M. Lauderdale; Adam Levey; Robert Taylor

Pink Martini chronology
Sympathique (1997)	Hang On Little Tomato (2004)	Hey Eugene! (2007)

Singles from Hang On Little Tomato
- 1. "Una notte a Napoli" Released: 2004; 2. "Let's Never Stop Falling in Love" Released: 2004; 3. "Lilly" Released: 2004

Professional ratings
Review scores
Source	Rating
AllMusic	4/5 stars
BBC Music	Positive

Hang On Little Tomato is the second studio album by American band Pink Martini, released on October 19, 2004, by their own record label, Heinz Records. It has been certified gold in France, Canada, Greece, and Turkey. It was then certified double platinum in France by the UPFI in 2013. In 2014, it was awarded a platinum certification from the Independent Music Companies Association, denoting sales in excess of 400,000 copies across Europe. As of October 2013, it had sold 750,000 copies worldwide.

== Overview ==
As a change from their first album, Pink Martini's second album Hang On Little Tomato features mostly original songs written by band members, and sung in six different languages (French, Italian, Japanese, Croatian, Spanish and English).

The song title is a reference to the Hunt's Ketchup ad campaign "Hang On, Little Tomato!" in a 1964 issue of Life magazine.

== Track listing ==
All lyrics and music by China Forbes and Thomas M. Lauderdale, except where noted.

No.	Title	Lyrics	Music	Length
1.	"Let's Never Stop Falling in Love"			3:02
2.	"Anna (El Negro Zumbón)"	Roman Vatro	Francesco Giordano	2:34
3.	"Hang On Little Tomato"	Patrick Abbey; Forbes; Lauderdale	Abbey; Forbes; Lauderdale	3:15
4.	"The Gardens of Sampson & Beasley"			4:00
5.	"Veronique"	Gregory Tozian; Lauderdale	Tozian; Lauderdale	3:17
6.	"Dansez-vous"	Robert Taylor; Forbes	Taylor; Forbes	2:51
7.	"Lilly"			2:41
8.	"Autrefois"			3:37
9.	"U Plavu Zoru"	Mario Lalich; Lauderdale	David Eby; Forbes; Brian Davis; Derek Rieth; Taylor; Gavin Bondy; John Wager; Douglas Smith; Lauderdale	5:58
10.	"Clementine"			3:50
11.	"Una notte a Napoli"	Alba Clemente; Johnny Dynell; Forbes; Lauderdale	Forbes; Lauderdale	4:43
12.	"Kikuchiyo to Mohshimasu" (originally performed by Hiroshi Wada & His Mahina Stars, 1964)	Michio Yamagami	Yoichi Suzuki	4:29
13.	"Aspettami"			3:35
14.	"Song of the Black Swan"		Heitor Villa-Lobos	2:10

- The 2004 Audiogram Canada CD release contains the bonus track "Sympathique (Version Inédite)" (Forbes/Lauderdale) - 03:32

== Personnel ==
- China Forbes, Vocals
- Robert Taylor, Trombone, Trumpet
- Dan Faehnle, Guitar, Mandolin
- Maureen Love, Harp
- Brian Davis, Percussion, Conga, Tamborim
- Derek Rieth, Percussion, Bongos, Caxixi, Surdo, Shekere
- Gavin Bondy, Trumpet
- Thomas Lauderdale, Piano
- Timothy Nishimoto, Vocals
- Martín Zarzar, Percussion, Drums, Timbales
- Phil Baker, Bass Upright
- Timothy Jensen, Sax Baritone
- Michael Spiro, Conga
- Osao Murata, Organ
- Kazunori Asano, Acoustic Guitar, Ukulele
- Douglas Edwards Smith, Percussion, Timbales, Pandeiro, Vibraphone, Guiro
- Masumi Timson, Koto
- Hiroshi Wada, Slide Guitar
- Norman Leyden, Clarinet
- John Wager, Bass Upright
- Doug Peebles, Trombone
- Jason Stronquist, Trombone
- Julie Coleman, Violin
- Paloma Griffin, Violin
- Denise Huizenga, Violin
- Joel Belgique, Viola
- Mara Lise Gearman, Viola
- Tyler Neist, Viola
- Charles Noble, Viola
- Oreet Ranon, Cello
- Heather Blackburn, Cello
- Pansy Chang, Cello
- Phil Hansen, Cello
- Timothy Scott, Cello
- Dieter Ratzlaf, Cello

== Charts ==
=== Weekly charts ===
Weekly chart performance for Hang On Little Tomato
Chart (2004–2005)	Peak position
Belgian Albums (Ultratop Flanders)	52
Dutch Albums (Album Top 100)	98
French Albums (SNEP)	12
Greek Albums (IFPI)	7
Polish Albums (ZPAV)	43
Swiss Albums (Schweizer Hitparade)	25
UK Albums (Official Charts)	198
US Billboard 200	122
US Independent Albums (Billboard)	7

=== Year-end charts ===
2004 year-end chart performance for Hang On Little Tomato
Chart (2004)	Position
French Albums (SNEP)	129

2005 year-end chart performance for Hang On Little Tomato
Chart (2005)	Position
French Albums (SNEP)	115

== Certifications ==
Sales certifications for Hang On Little Tomato
Region	Certification	Certified units/sales
Canada (Music Canada)	Gold	50,000^{^}
Germany (BVMI)	Gold	10,000^{^}
Greece (IFPI Greece)	Gold	10,000^{^}
Summaries
Europe (IMPALA)	Platinum	
^{^} Shipments figures based on certification alone.
