= The Cambridge Student =

Cambridge University student newspaper

- Type: Online student newspaper
- Owner: Cambridge Students' Union
- Editor-in-chief: Lily Brough
- Deputy editor: Saranka Maheswaran
- Founded: 1999
- Headquarters: Cambridge University Students' Union, 17 Mill Lane, Cambridge, CB2 1RX, UK
- Website: www.tcs.cam.ac.uk

The Cambridge Student, commonly known as TCS, is one of Cambridge University's student newspapers. The paper was founded in October 1999 and once produced a weekly print run of 10,000 copies during university term time. The publication has been relaunched in 2023. It is affiliated with the Cambridge University Students' Union (CUSU), although it is editorially independent.

The paper has interviewed public figures, including United Nations Weapons Inspector Hans Blix, director Ridley Scott, politician Ian Paisley; the BBC's security correspondent Frank Gardner; and journalist David Frost, and academics including Jason Arday.

TCS has historically national headlines with news of animal rights abuses at the university. The newspaper's photography of the tuition fee riots also won plaudits. In March 2011 the paper became embroiled in controversy when its editor, Philip Brook, forged a letter insinuating unfounded sexual allegations against a fictional fellow at St. John's.

In April 2016, TCS announced that CUSU was preparing to pass a budget which would cut its print funding, and turn it into an online newspaper, with occasional print editions. Sections of an internal letter, leaked to Varsity, said that CUSU had ended up in a "difficult situation" financially, which lead to the need for cuts. The budget was ratified at a meeting of CUSU's council on 16 May 2016, bringing TCS's print run to an end. Despite enjoying a brief fortnightly reappearance in print following widespread negative coverage of its student union publisher over the issue, in October 2018 the print run of TCS was confirmed to have been ended, following ongoing reports of huge losses incurred by Cambridge University Students' Union over a number of years.

== 2023 Relaunch ==
In 2023, TCS was relaunched with its first print publication since 2021, with a focus on long-form journalism and global issues. TCS published a new zine called MUSE in February 2024, and has launched a podcast.
