= Get Happy (Pink Martini album) =

Studio album by Pink Martini
- Released: September 24, 2013
- Recorded: January 2012–June 2013
- Genre: Bossa Nova, Easy Listening
- Label: Heinz

Pink Martini chronology
| 1969 (2011) | Get Happy (2013) | Dream a Little Dream (2014) |

Get Happy is the sixth studio album from the American musical group Pink Martini. It was released on September 24, 2013, under the band's own label, Heinz Records. Guest artists include Phyllis Diller, Philippe Katerine, Meow Meow, Ari Shapiro, the von Trapps, and Rufus Wainwright.

== Composition ==
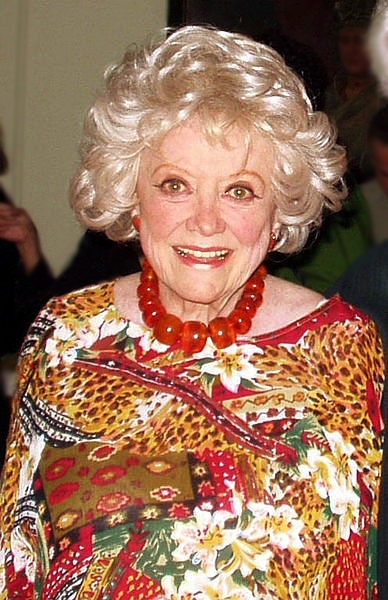
Phyllis Diller, featured vocalist on "Smile" (Charlie Chaplin)

Get Happy contains sixteen tracks. "Smile", originally by Charlie Chaplin, serves as the closing track and features American actress and comedian Phyllis Diller (1917–2012). Pink Martini and Diller recorded the song in January 2012 in her living room in Los Angeles, and the group released it upon her death. In 2014 it was awarded a double silver certification from the Independent Music Companies Association, which indicated sales of at least 40,000 copies throughout Europe.

== Track listing ==
1. "Ich dich liebe" (Max Kolpé, Lotar Olias, Karl Vibach), featuring China Forbes
2. "Quizás, Quizás, Quizás" (Osvaldo Farrés), featuring Storm Large
3. "I'm Waiting for You to Come Back" (Yan Kuan, Chen Ruizhen), featuring Meow Meow
4. "Omide zendegani" (Anoushiravan Rohani, Touradj Negahban), featuring Storm Large
5. "Yo te quiero siempre" (Ernesto Lecuona), featuring Ari Shapiro
6. "Je ne t'aime plus" (Forbes, Katerine), featuring China Forbes and Philippe Katerine
7. "Zundoko-Bushi", featuring Timothy Nishimoto
8. "Până când nu te iubeam" (Romanian traditional), featuring Storm Large
9. "She Was Too Good to Me" (Richard Rodgers, Lorenz Hart), featuring Robert Taylor
10. "Üsküdar'a Gider İken" (Turkish traditional), featuring China Forbes
11. "Sway" (Pablo Beltrán Ruiz, Norman Gimbel), featuring Storm Large
12. "Kitty Come Home" (Anna McGarrigle), featuring Rufus Wainwright with the von Trapps
13. "What'll I Do?" (Irving Berlin), featuring China Forbes
14. "Get Happy/Happy Days Are Here Again" (Harold Arlen, Ted Koehler/Milton Ager, Jack Yellen), featuring China Forbes and Rufus Wainwright
15. "Heliotrope Bouquet" (Scott Joplin, Louis Chauvin) (instrumental)
16. "Smile" (Charlie Chaplin, John Turner, Geoffrey Parsons), featuring Phyllis Diller

== Chart performance ==
| Chart (2013) | Peak position |
|---|---|
| Belgian Albums (Ultratop Flanders) | 107 |
| Belgian Albums (Ultratop Wallonia) | 43 |
| French Albums (SNEP) | 36 |
| Polish Albums (ZPAV) | 50 |
| Scottish Albums (OCC) | 91 |
| Spanish Albums (PROMUSICAE) | 36 |
| Swiss Albums (Schweizer Hitparade) | 67 |
| UK Albums (OCC) | 76 |
| UK Independent Albums (OCC) | 19 |
| US Billboard 200 | 48 |
| US Top Jazz Albums (Billboard) | 1 |
