= Dan Faehnle =

American guitarist from Ohio

Dan Faehnle is an American guitarist from Ohio who is a member of the band Pink Martini.

He has worked with Joey DeFrancesco, Dave Frishberg, Terry Gibbs, Eddie Harris, Rebecca Kilgore, Diana Krall, Zoot Sims, Clark Terry, and Leroy Vinnegar.

== Discography ==
=== As leader ===
- My Ideal (2001)
- Ohio Lunch (2003)

With Pink Martini

- Sympathique (Heinz, 1997)
- Hang On Little Tomato (Heinz, 2004)
- Hey Eugene! (Naive, 2007)
- Splendor in the Grass (Heinz, 2009)
- Joy to the World (Heinz, 2010)
- 1969 (Heinz, 2011)
- Joy to the World Pt. 2 (Heinz, 2011)
- Joy to the World Pt. 3 (Heinz, 2012)
- Get Happy (Heinz, 2013)
- Dream a Little Dream (Heinz, 2014)
- Je Dis Oui! (Heinz, 2016)

=== As guest ===
- Dick Berk, East Coast Stroll (Reservoir, 1993)
- Dick Berk, One by One (Reservoir, 1996)
- Mel Brown, Live at Jimmy Mak's (Karmenpolicy, 1999)
- Terry Gibbs, Feelin' Good (Mack Avenue, 2005)
- Terry Gibbs, Findin' the Groove (Jazzed Media, 2006)
- Tom Grant, Instinct (Shanachie, 1995)
- Tom Grant, Lip Service (Shanachie, 1997)
- Chuck Israels, The Bellingham Sessions Volume 2 (Audio Ideas, 2000)
- Rebecca Kilgore, Not a Care in the World (Arbors, 1996)
- King Louie Organ Trio, It's About Time (Shoug, 2019)
- Ben Wolfe, Murray's Cadillac (Amosaya, 2001)
