= 1969 (Pink Martini and Saori Yuki album) =

2011 studio album by Pink Martini and Saori Yuki

Studio album by Pink Martini and Saori Yuki
- Released: October 12, 2011
- Recorded: March–June, 2011
- Studio: Kung Fu Bakery (Portland, Oregon); Superdigital (Portland, Oregon)
- Genre: Kayōkyoku; lounge
- Length: 40:51
- Label: Heinz
- Producer: Thomas M. Lauderdale; San-e Ichii

Pink Martini chronology
A Retrospective (2011)	1969 (2011)	Get Happy (2013)

1969 is a collaborative studio album by American band Pink Martini and Japanese singer Saori Yuki, released in Japan on October 12, 2011, by EMI Music Japan and in the United States on November 1, 2011, by Heinz Records.

As of October 2013, the album had sold over 500,000 copies in Japan.

== Track listing ==
No.	Title	Lyrics	Music	Original artist	Length
1.	"Yuuzuki (Evening Moon)"	Rei Nakanishi	Miki Takahashi	Jun Mayuzumi (1968)	3:18
2.	"Mayonaka no Bossa Nova (Midnight Bossa Nova)"	Jun Hashimoto	Kyohei Tsutumi	Hide to Rosanna (1969)	3:15
3.	"Du soleil plein les yeux (Eyes Full of Sun)"	Catherine Desage	Francis Lai	Francis Lai et Severine (1970)	3:28
4.	"Puff, the Magic Dragon"	Akira Nogami (Japanese version, for Japan TV series Okā-san to Issho c. 1969)	Leonard Lipton, Peter Yarrow	Peter, Paul & Mary (1963)	3:50
5.	"Ii janaino Shiawase naraba (It's Okay if I'm Happy)"	Tokiko Iwatani	Taku Izumi	Naomi Sagara (1969)	3:34
6.	"Blue Light Yokohama"	Jun Hashimoto	Kyohei Tsutsumi	Ayumi Ishida (1968)	2:50
7.	"Yoake no Scat (Melody for a New Dawn)"	Michio Yamagami	Taku Izumi	Saori Yuki (1969)	3:16
8.	"Mas que Nada"	Fumio Nagata (Japanese version)	Jorge Ben	Astrud Gilberto (1969)	2:34
9.	"Is That All There Is?"	Tadashi Nagai, Rena Connor, Yoshio Kurosaki, Thomas M. Lauderdale, Camellia Nieh, Satomi Sano, Masumi and Stephen Timson, and Mas Yatabe.	Jerry Leiber and Mike Stoller	Peggy Lee (1969)	4:12
10.	"Watashi mo Anata to Naite Ii? (Consolation)"	Go Misawa	Go Misawa	Mieko Kaneda (1969)	3:34
11.	"Wasuretainoni (I Want To Forget You, But...)"	Larry Kolber ("I Love How You Love Me"); Terunobo Okuyama (Japanese)	Barry Mann	Moko, Beaver & Olive (1969) after The Paris Sisters (1961)	2:53
12.	"Kisetsu no Ashioto (Footsteps of the Seasons)"	Yasushi Akimoto	Hitoshi Haba	New song	3:47
Total length:					40:51

== Charts ==
=== Weekly charts ===
Weekly chart performance for 1969
Chart (2011–2012)	Peak position
Canadian Albums (Nielsen SoundScan)	64
Greek Albums (IFPI)	2
Japanese Albums (Oricon)	4
US Top Jazz Albums (Billboard)	5
US Traditional Jazz Albums (Billboard)	5

=== Year-end charts ===
Year-end chart performance for 1969
Chart (2012)	Position
Japanese Albums (Oricon)	24
US Top Jazz Albums (Billboard)	27
US Traditional Jazz Albums (Billboard)	17

== Certifications ==
Certifications for 1969
Region	Certification	Certified units/sales
Japan (RIAJ)	Platinum	250,000^{^}
^{^} Shipments figures based on certification alone.
