= Chen Gexin =

Chinese popular music songwriter

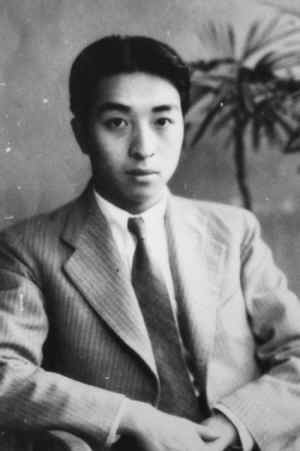
- Chen Gexin
- Born: September 19, 1914; Nanhui District, Shanghai, Republic of China
- Died: January 25, 1961 (aged 46); Baimiaoling, Anhui, China
- Spouse: Jin Jiaoli (m. 1935–1961)
- Children: Chen Gang (son); Chen Keng (son); Chen Dong (son); Chen Xiao Li (daughter)
- Relatives: Chen Fanhong (granddaughter)

Chinese name
- Traditional Chinese: 陳歌辛
- Simplified Chinese: 陈歌辛
Transcriptions
Standard Mandarin
- Hanyu Pinyin: Chén Gēxīn

Chen Gexin (Chinese: 陳歌辛; pinyin: Chén Gēxīn; Wade–Giles: Ch'en Ko-hsin; September 19, 1914 – January 25, 1961) was a Chinese popular music songwriter. He also used the pen names Lín Méi (林枚) and Qìng Yú (慶餘). Chen Gexin was beaten to death in his sleep during the Anti-Rightist Campaign.

== Biography ==
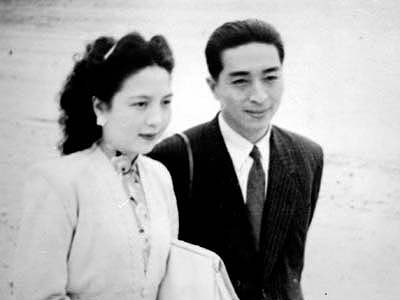
Chen Gexin and wife Jin Jiaoli

Chen was born on September 19, 1914, to a low social status family but a wealthy maternal Indian grandfather. He married his admirer and student Jin Jiaoli, against her Korean family's wishes in 1935. During World War II, he was jailed by the Japanese puppet regime for his patriotic songs. Chen and his family moved to Hong Kong after the war ended.

With the Communist seizure of power in China in 1949, popular music was considered ideologically suspect and Chen was labeled a rightist and imprisoned in a laogai for "reform through labor" at Baimiaoling Farm, Anhui, in 1957, there he befriended a journalist named Ai Yi.

According to an essay and reports by Ai Yi, Chen Gexin was beaten to death during the Anti-Rightist Campaign at the young age of 46, marking the tragic end of a talented man. He was buried in the mass grave at the hill near the farm. A year later, Chen's widow Jin Jiaoli went there with a box to search through the dead bodies in a vain effort to collect his remains.

He was rehabilitated in 1979.

== Music ==
Throughout his life, Chen has produced more than 200 songs. On top of that, he conducted symphony orchestras and held recitals for many times. Chen was the composer of famous mid-20th century popular standards such as "Shanghai Nights" (夜上海) and "The Blossom of Youth" (花樣年華), both sung by Zhou Xuan. His song Rose, Rose, I Love You, sung by American singer Frankie Laine in 1951, is the only major popular music hit in the United States by a Chinese composer. When Chen's youngest son went to the United States for advanced education, he was able to meet Laine and thereafter maintained a correspondence. Another of his songs titled, "Gongxi Gongxi" (恭喜恭喜) was originally written to celebrate the end of the Second Sino-Japanese War and has become a popular Chinese New Year standard. His music continues to be performed and is featured in films such as Eros.

== Descendants ==
Chen Gexin and his wife Jin Jiaoli (金嬌麗) are the parents of Chinese classical composer Chen Gang, and grandfather of China's first Miss Internet, Chen Fanhong.
