= Manuel Jiménez (musician) =

Puerto Rican musician

Manuel A. Jiménez or "El Canario", (born in Orocovis, Puerto Rico on January 1, 1895 - November 21, 1975), was a Puerto Rican musician most famous for his work in the plena style. During the 1930s, he introduced new elements like piano, horns, and bass into plena, spreading its popularity. Jiménez died on November 21, 1975.
