= Franco Pisano =

Musical artist

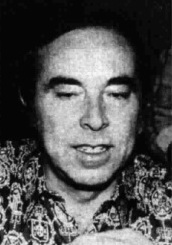

Background information
- Born: 10 December 1922; Cagliari, Italy
- Died: 6 January 1977 (aged 54) Rome, Italy
- Genres: Jazz
- Occupations: Composer, arranger, conductor, musician

Franco Pisano (10 December 1922 – 6 January 1977) was an Italian composer, conductor, arranger, and jazz musician.

Born in Cagliari, Sardinia, the older brother of the composer Berto Pisano, he studied violin, classical guitar, and piano at the Conservatory of Cagliari. He started his career as a musician with his brother in the jazz group Asternovas. Later in his career he concentrated on composing pop songs and musical scores for films and television programs. He died of liver cancer at the age of 54.

== Selected filmography ==
- Operation Counterspy (1965)
- Superargo Versus Diabolicus (1966)
- How to Kill 400 Duponts (1967)
- Goldface, the Fantastic Superman (1967)
- Basta guardarla (1970)
- The Virgo, the Taurus and the Capricorn (1977)
