= Saori Yuki =

Japanese singer and actress (born 1946)

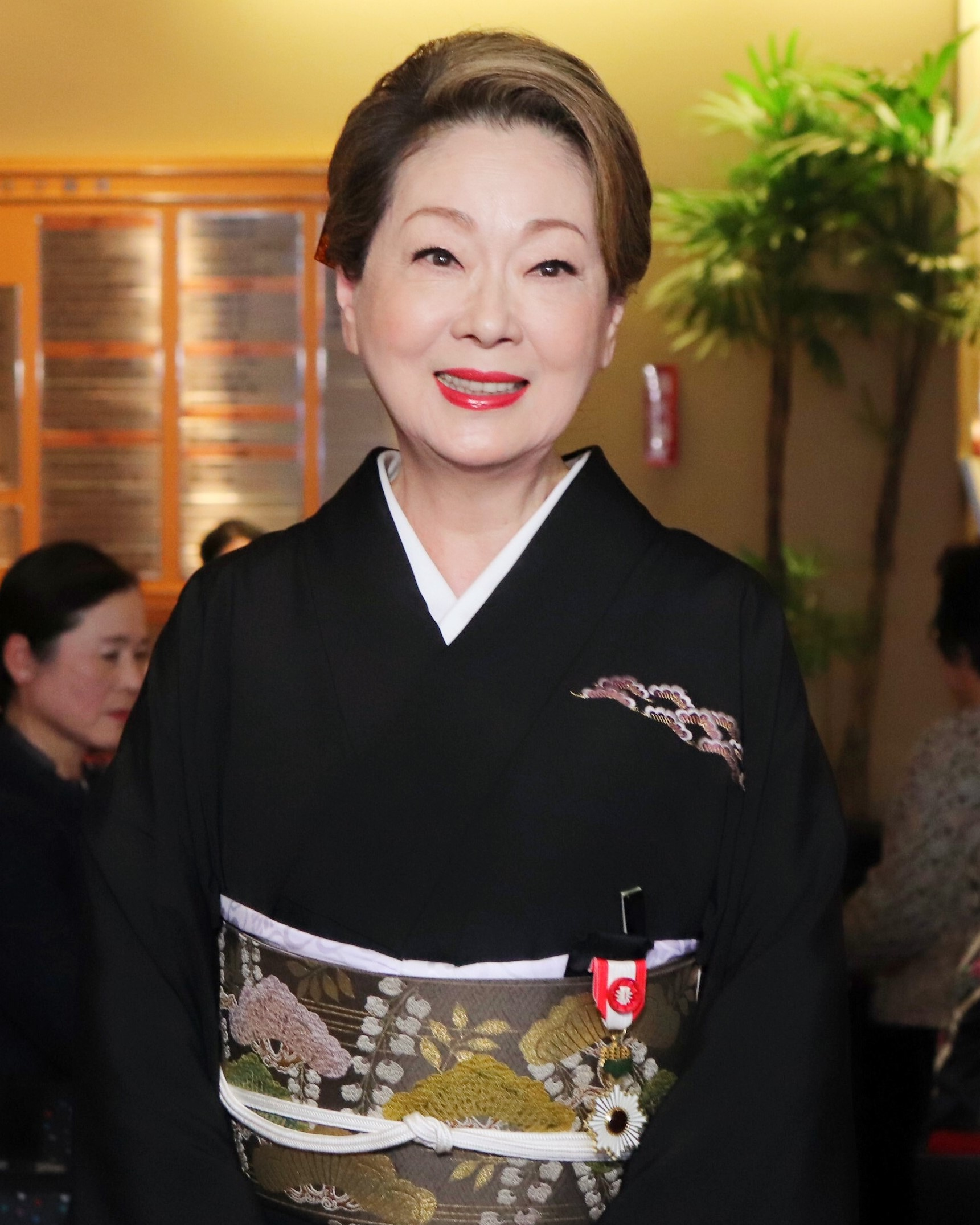
- Yuki in 2019

Background information
- Born: Akiko Yasuda; November 13, 1946 (age 79); Kiryū, Gunma, Japan
- Genres: Pop, jazz, chanson
- Occupations: Singer; actress; talent manager
- Years active: 1965–present

Saori Yuki (由紀さおり, Yuki Saori; born November 13, 1946) is a Japanese singer and actress. She was born as Akiko Yasuda (Yasuda Akiko (安田 章子) in Kiryū, Gunma, Japan and raised in Yokohama. She started her singing career with her older sister Sachiko (b. 1941) as a child singer. In 1965 she debuted with the single "Hitchhike Musume (Hitchhiking girl)" on King Records (Japan) as Akiko Yasuda.

== History ==
In 1969, Saori Yuki had a hit with "Yoake no Scat (Scat at dawn)", which sold 2 million units in two months, stayed at the top spot for 10 weeks and in the top ten for four months. The song's success led her to appear at the NHK's Kōhaku Uta Gassen, the annual year-end music show (after that, she continued to appear consecutively up until 1978). In 1970, the single "Tegami (The Letter)" peaked at No. 1 and was the second best-selling single in Japan of 1970. For "Tegami", she won the vocal award at the 12th Japan Record Awards. She received the Best Vocalist Award at the 15th Japan Record Awards for her hit "Koibumi (Love Letter)".

She quickly became a popular TV personality, appeared on a number of variety shows, and acted in several movies. She received the Award of Outstanding Performance by an Actress in a Supporting Role in Japan Academy Prize in 1983 for her role of Chikako Numata, a mother of two difficult sons in The Family Game.

In 1985, she started appearing on stage with her sister, Sachiko. They toured around Japan with their specialty of Japanese children's songs and received the Best Planning Award in 28th Japan Record Awards for their hit album Ano-toki, Kono-uta (あの時・この歌 ("Those Times, These Songs"). Their repertoire was not limited to children's songs, but also included pop, classical, and anime songs.

In 2009, she released her first original album since 1984, commemorating the 40th anniversary of her singing career as Saori Yuki. A collaboration album with Pink Martini titled 1969 was released in November 2011 in more than 20 countries, and quickly gained popularity in various places including the United States, Canada, Singapore and Greece. She also appeared as guest soloist on Pink Martini's festive album, Joy to the World, singing the Japanese language version of "White Christmas".

In 2012, Saori Yuki won the US Billboard Publisher's Award.

== Filmography ==
- The Family Game (1983), Chikako Numata, the mother
- Early Spring Story (1985), Keiko Otake, Okino's fiancee
- Blue Heaven wo Kimi ni (2020)
- A List for Tomorrow (2027)

== Discography ==
As Akiko Yasuda:

- Hitchhike Musume (1965)
- Doko ni iruno Papa? (1965)
- O-wakare no Namida (1965)
- Furusato no Bokujō (1966)
- Kuore no Uta
- Roman "Uki Uki"

As Saori Yuki:

- Yoake no Scat (1969) (#1)
- Tenshi no Scat (1969) (#15)
- Kareha no Machi (1969) (#29)
- Suki yo (1970)
- Tegami (1970) (#1)
- Cleopatra no Namida (1970)
- Ikigai (1970) (#6)
- Kono Ai o Eien ni (1971) (#57)
- Otoko no Kokoro (1971) (#80)
- Valerie/Tōsui no Waltz (1971)
- Hatsukoi no Oka (1971) (#68)
- Tsuchi ni Kaeru made (1972)
- Furusato (1972)
- Rindō no Hana (1972) (#64)
- Room Light (1973) (#23)
- Koibumi (1973) (#32)
- Hakata Ningyō ni Yosete (1973)
- Haru no Arashi (1974) (#67)
- Michiko (1974)
- Banka (1974) (#15)
- Kisetsufū (1975) (#68)
- Sayonara no Hashirigaki (1975)
- Bojō (1975)
- Katachi-bakari no Kōfuku (1976)
- Tsukanoma no Ame (1976)
- Kokoromochi Kimagure (1976)
- Furari Furarete (1976) (#38)
- U・Fu・Fu (1977)
- Yarinaoshitai no (1977)
- Garasu no Hibi (1978)
- Tokyo Babylon (1978)
- Ai o Kirifuda ni Shite (1979)
- Aishita mou Koto na Kare (1979)
- Tasogare Tapestry (1980)
- Otoko Tomodachi (1980)
- Kanashii Akuma (1980)
- Ryōgokubashi (1981)
- Atsumi Chihō no Komori-uta (1981)
- Adieu (1982)
- Straight (1982)
- Single Night (1983)
- Konomama ga Ii no (1984)
- TOKYO Waltz (1984)
- Kiyari Sodachi (1985)
- O-saki ni dōzo (1987) (#62)
- Yagurumasō〜Yumeji no Onna〜 (1988)
- Kokoro no Ieji (1988)
- Yurayura (1988)
- HIROSHIMA (1989, with Sachiko Yasuda)
- Nedoganse (1990, with Sachiko Yasuda)
- Akai Hoshi Aoi Hoshi (1995)
- Koimatsuri (1996)
- Suite Waltz no Nagareru Kawa ni (1998)
- Yume Mousukoshi (1998)
- Yorimichi (1999)
- Toruko-kōshinkyoku (1999, with Sachiko Yasuda)
- Kono Hoshi no Doko ka de (2000, with Sachiko Yasuda)
- Asakiyumemishi (2001)
- Nijiiro no Sunadokei (2002, with Sachiko Yasuda)
- Yotte Hizamakura (2002)
- Saikai Love Song (2003)
- Kisei (2003, with Sachiko Yasuda)
- "Ryokka Fair・Image Song Taiyō Sanka" Who are you? (2005, with Sachiko Yasuda)
- Izayoi no Tsuki (2005, with Sachiko Yasuda)
- Kono Yo no Hate made Soba ni Ite (2006)
- Komoro Waga Omoide (2006)
- Shiawase no Canon〜Chapter 2〜 (2007)
- Kisetsu no Ashioto (2011)
- Ai da Toka (2013) (#145)
- Watashi no Uta (2013)

With Pink Martini:

- 1969 (2011)

== Honours ==
- Order of the Rising Sun, 4th Class, Gold Rays with Rosette (2019)
