= Pink Martini =

American pop jazz lounge band

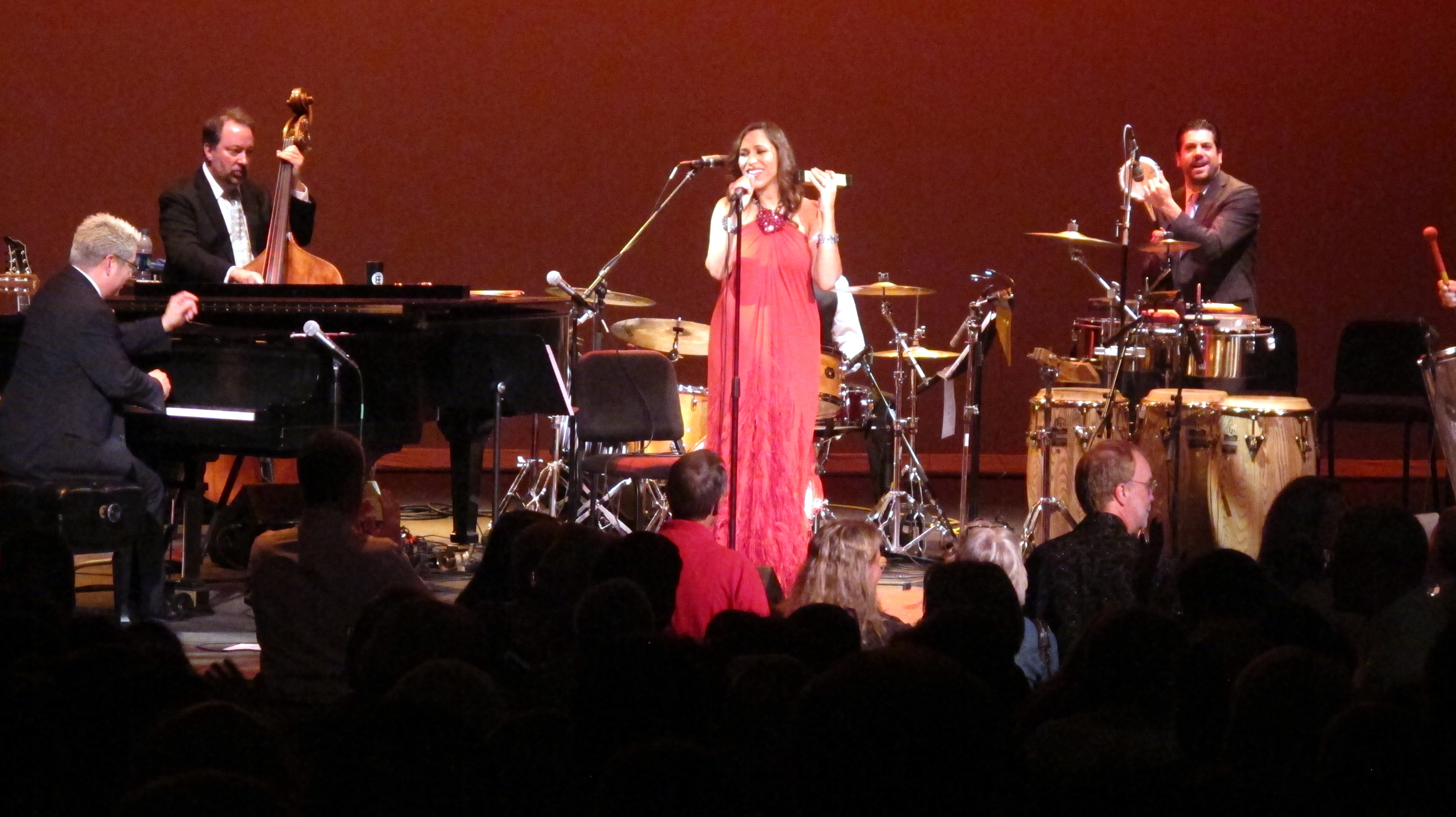
- Pink Martini - 2012 Savannah Music Festival

Background information
- Origin: Portland, Oregon, United States
- Genres: Classical, traditional pop, Latin, jazz, pop, rock, easy listening
- Years active: 1994–present
- Labels: Heinz, Naïve, Wrasse, Audiogram
- Members: China Forbes; Storm Large; Thomas Lauderdale; Robert Taylor; Gavin Bondy; Achilles Liarmakopoulos; Dan Faehnle; Phil Baker; Nicholas Crosa; Timothy Nishimoto; Brian Lavern Davis; Miguel Bernal; Reinhardt Melz; Antonis Andreou; Pansy Chang; Kyle Mustain; Mihail Iossifov; Dimitar Karamfilov; Andrew Borger; Jimmie Herrod; Edna Vazquez; William Seiji Marsh
- Past members: Doug Smith; Jonas Tauber; David Eby; Maureen Love; John Wager; Derek Rieth; Richard Rothfus; Pepe Raphael; Paloma Griffin; Martin Zarzar; Anthony Jones; J. Michael Kearsey
- Website: pinkmartini.com

Pink Martini is an American band founded in 1994 by pianist Thomas Lauderdale in Portland, Oregon. Group members call it a little orchestra that crosses several styles, such as classical, Latin, traditional pop, and jazz. The band's co-lead vocalists are China Forbes and Storm Large.

== History ==
Thomas Lauderdale has worked in politics since his years in high school in his hometown of Portland, Oregon. He considered the music at most fundraisers loud and boring. So as a remedy he founded the band Pink Martini in 1994, crossing genres such as classical, Latin, traditional pop, jazz to appeal to a broad audience. During the following year, he called China Forbes, one of his colleagues from Harvard University, and invited her to join the band. Their first single, "Sympathique", was released in 1997 and was nominated as Song of the Year at the Victoires de la Musique Awards in France.

Forbes is monolingual but sings in 15 languages. "All of us in Pink Martini have studied different languages as well as different styles of music from different parts of the world", says Lauderdale. "So inevitably, our repertoire is wildly diverse. At one moment, you feel like you're in the middle of a samba parade in Rio de Janeiro, and in the next moment, you're in a French music hall of the 1930s or a Palazzo in Napoli. It's a bit like an urban musical travelogue. We're very much an American band, but we spend a lot of time abroad and therefore have the incredible diplomatic opportunity to represent a broader, more inclusive America… the America which remains the most heterogeneously populated country in the world… composed of people of every country, every language, every religion". Featuring 10–12 musicians, Pink Martini performs its multilingual repertoire on concert stages and with symphony orchestras throughout the world.

== Performing ==
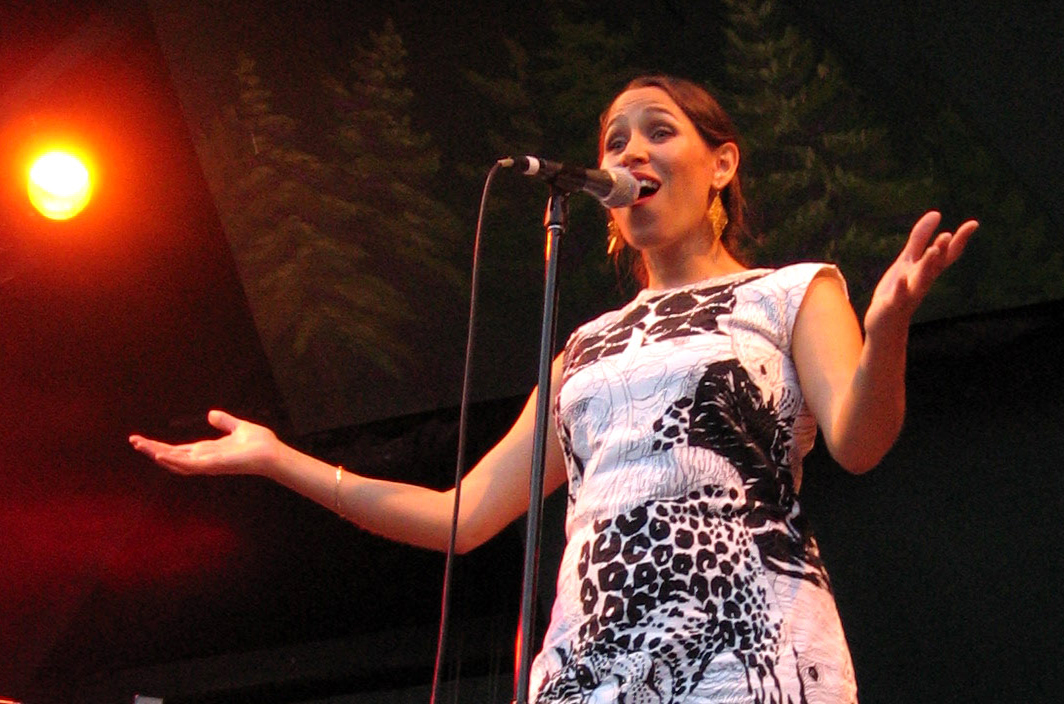
China Forbes in 2006

Pink Martini made its European debut at the Cannes Film Festival in 1997 and its orchestral debut in 1998 with the Oregon Symphony under the direction of Norman Leyden. Since then, the band has gone on to play with more than 50 orchestras around the world, including multiple engagements with the Los Angeles Philharmonic at the Hollywood Bowl, the Boston Pops, the National Symphony at the Kennedy Center, the San Francisco Symphony, and the BBC Concert Orchestra at Royal Albert Hall in London.

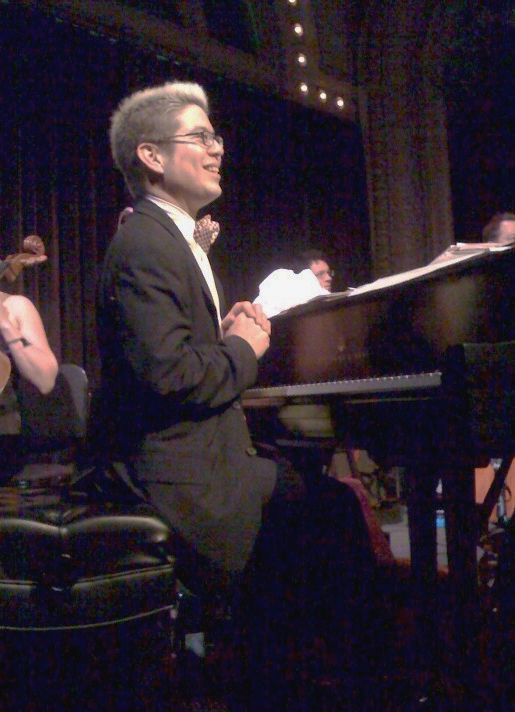
Thomas M. Lauderdale performing with Pink Martini at the Crystal Ballroom (Portland, Oregon) in 2008

Other appearances include the grand opening of the Los Angeles Philharmonic's Frank Gehry-designed Walt Disney Concert Hall, with return sold-out engagements for New Year's Eve 2003, 2004, 2008 and 2011; two sold-out concerts at Carnegie Hall; the opening party of the remodeled Museum of Modern Art in New York City; the Governor's Ball at the 80th Annual Academy Awards in 2008; the opening of the 2008 Sydney Festival in Australia; two sold-out concerts at Paris' legendary L'Olympia Theatre in 2011; and Paris' fashion house Lanvin's 10-year anniversary celebration for designer Alber Elbaz in 2012. In its twentieth year, Pink Martini was inducted into both the Hollywood Bowl Hall of Fame and the Oregon Music Hall of Fame. Pink Martini performed with the Eugene Ballet in 2006 and 2018.

On New Year's Eve 2005, Pink Martini performed live at the Arlene Schnitzer Concert Hall in Portland, Oregon. This performance was aired live on National Public Radio's Toast of the Nation, and in partnership with Oregon Public Broadcasting was recorded for a live DVD and later broadcast on US public broadcasting and French television. The DVD has been re-released to retail as Discover the World: Live in Concert, featuring not only the full concert, but several vignettes and a short documentary of the band's history.

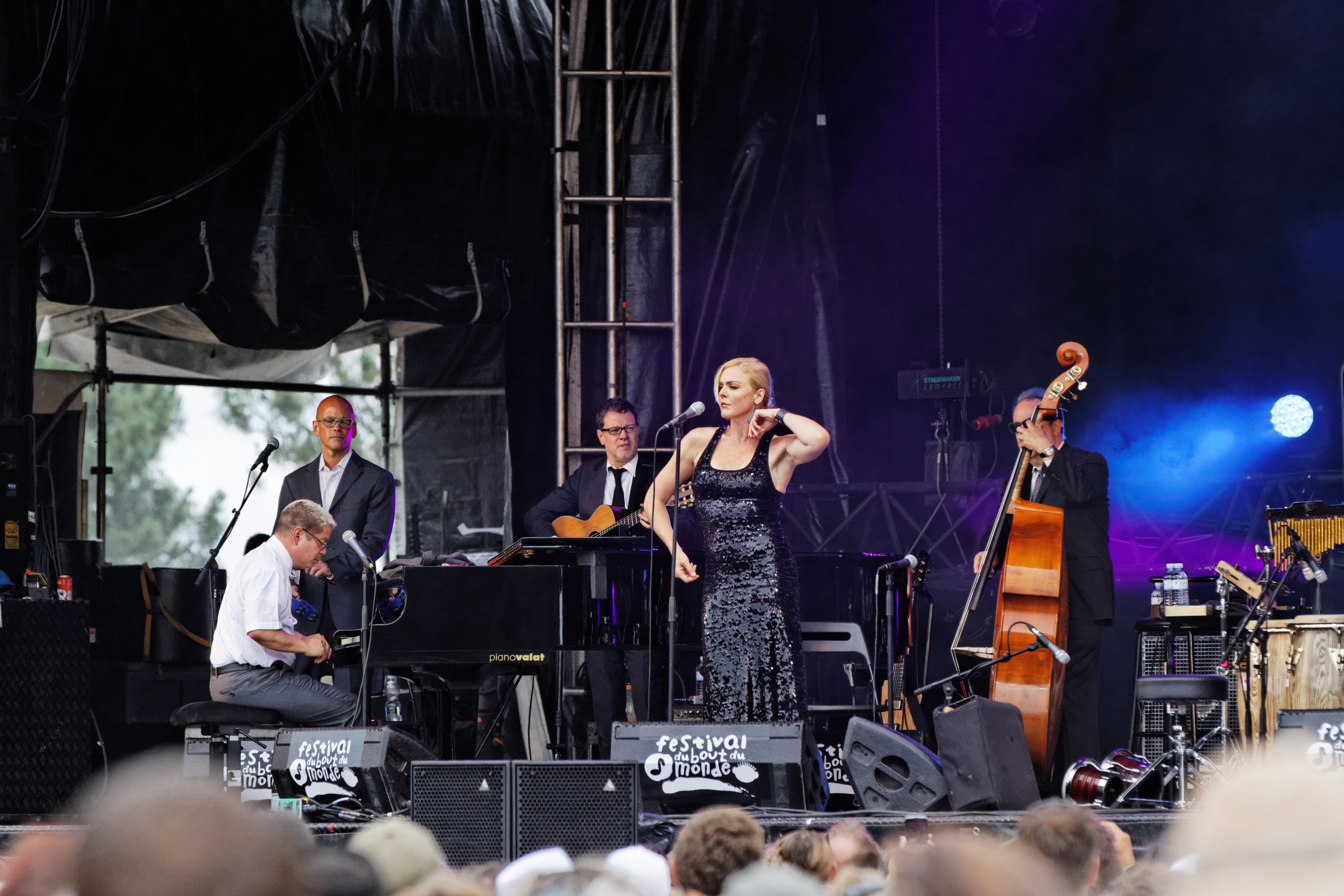
Festival du Bout du Monde 2014

On November 22, 2005, Pink Martini appeared on Late Night with Conan O'Brien. On June 1, 2007, the band appeared on the long-running BBC Two Later with Jools Holland TV music program. On June 14, 2007, Pink Martini performed on the Late Show with David Letterman, performing "Hey Eugene".

In December 2010, the band performed "We Three Kings" on The Tonight Show with Jay Leno and returned in December 2011 to perform "Santa Baby."

In February 2011, China Forbes recorded a video greeting to the European Space Agency's Italian astronaut, Paolo Nespoli, and Russian cosmonaut Aleksandr Kaleri, on board the International Space Station. The astronauts were preparing to oversee the docking of ESA's Automated Transfer Vehicle (ATV) cargo vessel, Johannes Kepler, which took place at 17:08 CET on 24 February. The greeting was set to the soundtrack of Dosvedanya Mio Bombino—one of Pink Martini's signature songs—and was mixed with footage of the docking.

== Recording ==
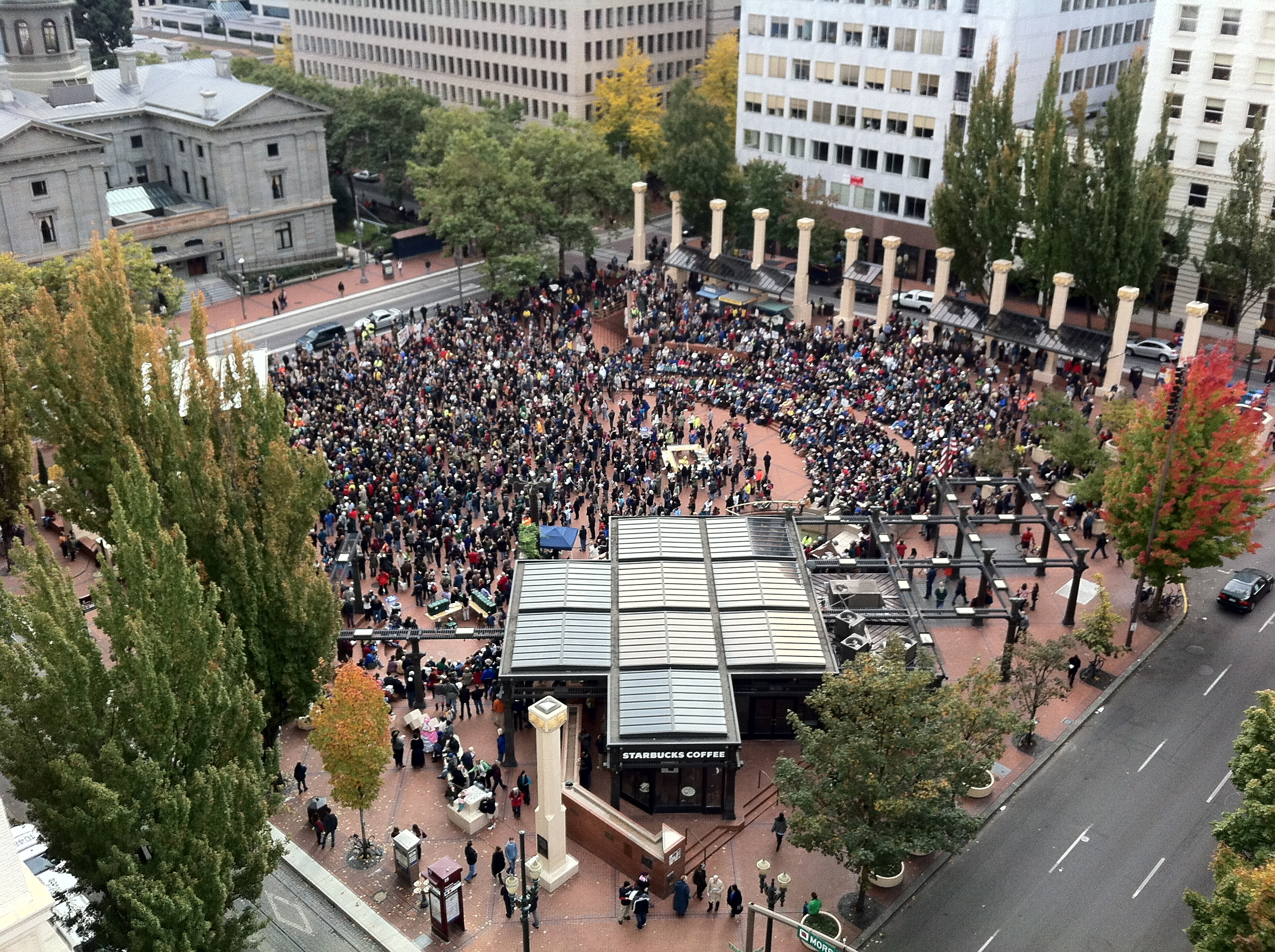
Pink Martini entertains Occupy Portland protesters

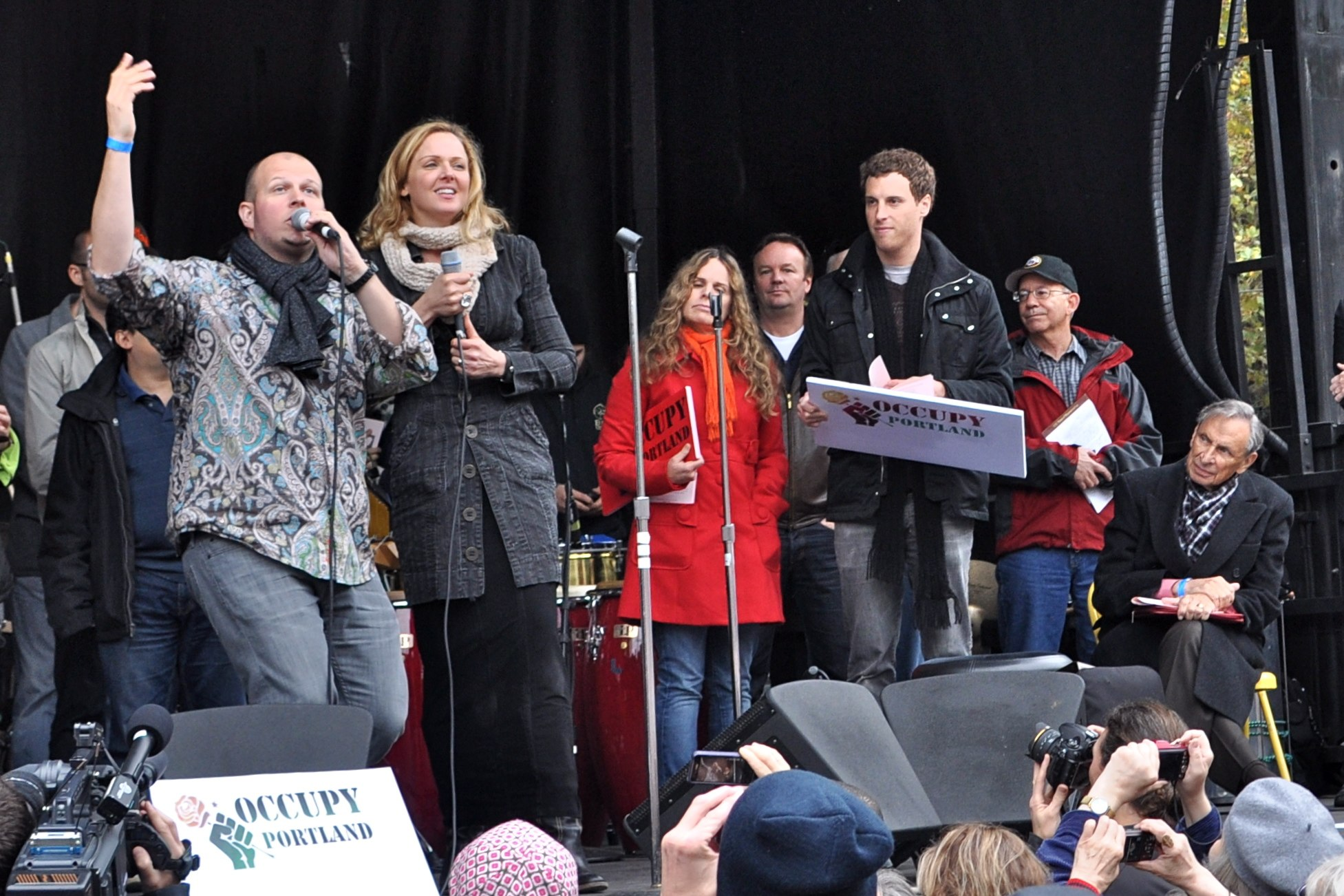
Pink Martini with Storm Large, Occupy Portland, October 28, 2011

Pink Martini's debut album Sympathique was released independently in 1997 on the band's label, Heinz Records, and earned the group nominations for "Song of the Year" and "Best New Artist" in France's Victoires de la Musique Awards in 2000.

Pink Martini released Hang On Little Tomato in 2004, Hey Eugene! in 2007 and Splendor in the Grass in 2009. In November 2010 the band released Joy to the World, a festive, multi-denominational holiday album featuring songs from around the globe. Joy to the World received glowing reviews and was carried in Starbucks stores during the 2010 and 2011 holiday seasons. All five albums have gone gold in France, Canada, Greece, and Turkey and have sold well over 2.5 million copies worldwide.

In Fall 2011, the band released two albums: A Retrospective, a collection of the band's most beloved songs spanning their 17-year career, which includes eight previously unreleased tracks, and 1969, an album of collaborations with Japanese singer Saori Yuki. 1969 has been certified platinum in Japan, reaching No. 2 on the Japanese charts. On September 24, 2013 the band released their seventh studio album Get Happy. On March 4, 2014, they released Dream a Little Dream with the von Trapps.

In August 2014, Derek Rieth was found dead of a self-inflicted gunshot wound to the head in what was ruled a suicide. In his honor, the band established the Derek Rieth Foundation with the goal of "Empowering Youth Through Music and Dance".

In 2016, Pink Martini released its 9th new studio album, Je dis oui!, featuring three songs bandleader Thomas Lauderdale co-wrote for the film Souvenir starring Isabelle Huppert. The album's guest vocalists include Ari Shapiro, Rufus Wainwright, Kathleen Saadat, and Ikram Goldman.

In 2018, the band released a "20th Anniversary Edition" of its seminal debut album Sympathique. This version of the album features the band's popular arrangement of Ravel's "Bolero", which had to be removed from the original album, and was reinstated on the 20th Anniversary Edition after entering the public domain. Also in 2018, the band collected songs in French from across its catalogue and released them on a compilation entitled Non Ouais! - The French Songs of Pink Martini.

The band has performed with Jimmy Scott, Carol Channing, Rufus Wainwright, Martha Wainwright, Jane Powell, Henri Salvador, Chavela Vargas, Joey Arias, Basil Twist, Georges Moustaki, Michael Feinstein, Gus Van Sant, Courtney Taylor Taylor of The Dandy Warhols, Norman Leyden, Hiroshi Wada, Alba Clemente, Johnny Dynell and Chi Chi Valenti, Ari Shapiro, Pepe Raphael of Pepe & the Bottle Blondes, the original cast of Sesame Street, Lions of Batucada, Jorge Alabê, March Fourth Marching Band, the Bonita Vista High School Marching Band from Chula Vista, California, and the Pacific Youth Choir of Portland, Oregon.

Pink Martini's songs appear in the films In the Cut, Nurse Betty, Josie and the Pussycats, Tortilla Soup, Hitch, Shanghai Kiss, Mary and Max, and Mr. & Mrs. Smith and have been used on the television shows Dead Like Me, The Sopranos, The West Wing, Castle, Sherlock, Parks and Recreation, Better Call Saul, and Scream Queens. Their song "Una notte a Napoli" is an integral part of the Italian movie Mine Vaganti (2010) by Italian-Turkish director Ferzan Özpetek.

== Heinz Records ==
Heinz Records is an independent record label that produces the band's albums. Named after Lauderdale's dog, Heinz Records is run by its members and is distributed by RED Distribution. Heinz Records is also the label for China Forbes, Storm Large, and The von Trapps.

== Discography ==
- Sympathique (1997)
- Hang On Little Tomato (2004)
- Hey Eugene! (2007)
- Splendor in the Grass (2009)
- Joy to the World (2010)
- A Retrospective (2011)
- 1969 (2011), with Saori Yuki
- Get Happy (2013)
- Dream a Little Dream (2014), with The von Trapps
- Je dis oui! (2016)
- Sympathique – 20th Anniversary Edition (2018)
- Non Ouais! – The French Songs of Pink Martini (2018)
- Besame Mucho (Edna Vazquez & Pink Martini) (2019)
- Tomorrow (Jimmie Herrod & Pink Martini) (2019)
