= China Forbes =

American musician (born 1970)

- Forbes with Pink Martini in concert, 2006

Background information
- Born: April 29, 1970 (age 56); Cambridge, Massachusetts, U.S.
- Occupations: Singer, songwriter
- Label: Heinz
- Member of: Pink Martini
- Website: www.chinaforbes.com

China Forbes (born April 29, 1970) is an American singer and songwriter who has been the lead singer of the band Pink Martini since 1995. In 2022, she won the Ella Fitzgerald Award at the Montreal International Jazz Festival.

== Life and career ==
The daughter of Peggy (née Woodford) and Donald Cameron Forbes, China Forbes was born and raised in Cambridge, Massachusetts. Her father was of French and Scottish descent, and her mother is African-American. She attended Phillips Exeter Academy ('88), then studied visual arts at Harvard University, where she met Thomas Lauderdale, a classically trained pianist. They became friends and met regularly to play music together. At Harvard, she won the Jonathan Levy Prize for acting.

After graduating in 1992, Forbes worked as an actress for several years, performing Off-Broadway in New York City. She then became a musician, forming a band and recording a solo album. She sang the song "Ordinary Girl" for the television series Clueless and "Que Sera Sera" over the credits for the movie In the Cut. While living in Portland, Oregon, Lauderdale asked her to sing with Pink Martini, a band he had assembled to play at political fundraisers. After three years commuting from New York, she moved to Portland in 1998 to work full-time with the band. Forbes and Lauderdale co-wrote the band's hit "Sympathique (Je ne Veux Pas Travailler)" among many other band originals.

Apart from her work with Pink Martini, she has released solo albums, including Love Handle (November 1995) and '78 (Heinz 2008) which includes her song "Hey Eugene" in its original version. She is featured on Michael Feinstein's album The Sinatra Project, singing a duet of "How Long Will It Last?". She recorded two songs in French with Georges Moustaki for his album Solitaire.

She is a cousin of former U.S. Secretary of State John Kerry and indie-rock musician Ed Droste of Grizzly Bear. Her sister is Maya Forbes, a screenwriter and director.

== Discography ==
- Love Handle (November, 1995)
- '78 (Heinz, 2008)
- The Road (2024)

With Pink Martini

- Sympathique (Heinz, 1997)
- Hang on Little Tomato (Heinz, 2004)
- Hey Eugene! (Heinz, 2007)
- Splendor in the Grass (Heinz, 2009)
- Joy to the World (Heinz, 2010)
- Get Happy (Heinz, 2013)
- Je Dis Oui! (Heinz, 2013)

With others

- 2003 Cruising Attitude, Dimitri from Paris
- 2008 Solitaire, Georges Moustaki
- 2008 The Sinatra Project, Michael Feinstein
