= Thomas Lauderdale =

American musician (born 1970)

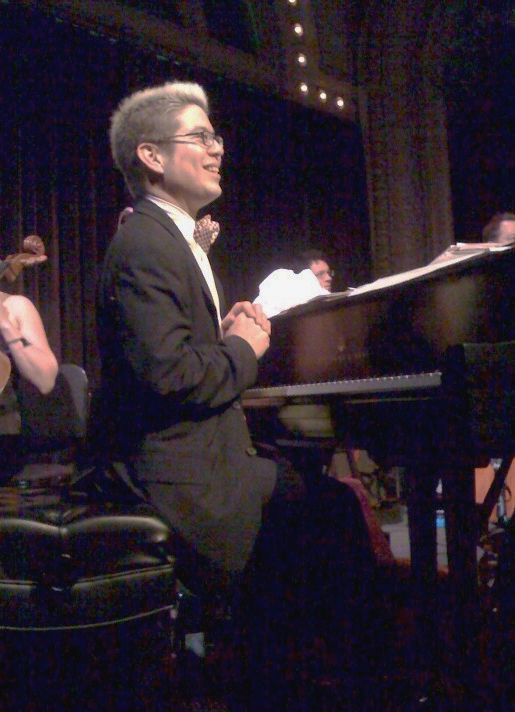
- Thomas M. Lauderdale performing with Pink Martini at the Crystal Ballroom (Portland, Oregon) in 2008

Background information
- Born: Thomas Mack Lauderdale; July 14, 1970 (age 56); Oakland, California
- Occupations: Musician, pianist
- Instrument: Piano
- Years active: 1982 - present
- Label: Heinz Records
- Website: Pink Martini website

Thomas Mack Lauderdale (born July 14, 1970) is an American musician and pianist, largely known for his work with his Portland-based band Pink Martini.

== Education ==
In Portland, Oregon Lauderdale began his studies with Sylvia Killman in 1982. Killman and Lauderdale remain close friends. Lauderdale won the "Oregon Symphony's annual Corbett Competition" in 1985, marking the beginning of a long association with conductor Norman Leyden. He graduated from Portland's Ulysses S. Grant High School in 1988, where he was student body president and editor of The Grantonian. Lauderdale studied at Harvard University, where he graduated cum laude with a degree in History and Literature.

== Career ==
In addition to his work with Pink Martini, Lauderdale has collaborated with cabaret performer and singer Meow Meow, the surf band Satan's Pilgrims and writer Tom Spanbauer. In Spring 2008, he completed his first film score for Chiara Clemente's documentary Our City Dreams, a portrait of five New York City-based women artists of different generations. In 2008, he performed as the featured piano soloist in Beethoven's Choral Fantasy with the Choral Arts Ensemble of Portland under the direction of Roger Doyle, and Gershwin's Concerto in F with the Oregon Symphony under the direction of Christoph Campestrini. In 2011 Lauderdale again appeared as the featured soloist with the Oregon Symphony, this time under the direction of Carlos Kalmar.

He has appeared as soloist with numerous orchestras and ensembles, including the Oregon Symphony, the Seattle Symphony, the Portland Youth Philharmonic, Chamber Music Northwest, the Choral Arts Ensemble of Portland and Oregon Ballet Theatre (where he collaborated with choreographer James Canfield and visual artists Storm Tharp and Malia Jensen on a ballet based on the original story of Bambi, written by Felix Salten in 1923).

== Political activism ==
In June 2009, Lauderdale organized a rally of support for Portland Mayor Sam Adams, the first openly gay mayor of a major American city. Adams had a “romantic relationship” with 17-year old intern Beau Breedlove that included kissing and romance before he turned 18. The Times reports that the "Oregonian, the local police union and JustOut, a local gay periodical" were calling for his resignation. Portlanders at Lauderdale's rally compared Adams to Bill Clinton, saying he only lied about sex and should not resign.

In October 2011, Lauderdale and Pink Martini organized and performed at a rally in support of the Occupy movement. The rally took place in downtown Portland in Pioneer Courthouse Square and included speeches and performances by Storm Large as well as Oregon congressmen Earl Blumenauer and Peter DeFazio.

== Personal life ==
Lauderdale lives in the Harker Building, a 9,600 square foot building in the downtown’s commercial district in Portland, Oregon.

== See also ==
- List of LGBTQ people from Portland, Oregon
