= Concert for Democracy in China =

1989 benefit concert held in Hong Kong

- Logo of the concert
- Venue: Happy Valley Racecourse, Hong Kong
- Date: May 27, 1989; 37 years ago
- Duration: 12 hours
- Attendance: 200,000 – 1,000,000
- Box office: HK$12,000,000

The Concert for Democracy in China (Chinese: 民主歌聲獻中華) was a benefit concert held in Hong Kong in support of the students involved in the 1989 Tiananmen Square protests. The concert was held on May 27, 1989, at the Happy Valley Racecourse on Hong Kong Island. The event lasted for 12 hours and raised over HK$12,000,000 (1.54 million US dollars) for the students in Beijing.

== Event ==
The event was hosted by James Wong, Phillip Chan, Eric Tsang, and John Shum. Shum stated in a later interview that all the performers enlisted voluntarily and were not invited. Sing Pao Daily News reported that the event was attended by nearly one million people, while Ta Kung Pao reported around 500,000 participants. Other estimates state the event was attended by around 200,000 people.

== Performers ==
- Albert Au
- Alex To
- Aling Choi
- Alvin Chan
- Alvin Kwok
- Anita Mui
- Andrew Lam
- Andy Hui
- Ann Mui
- Anthony Lun
- Angela Fong
- Angie Chiu
- Agnes Chan
- Beyond
- Bertha Ngai
- Bill Tung
- Blue Jeans
- Cally Kwong
- Candice Tai
- Chang Loo
- Cherrie Choi
- Cheung Ming-man
- Christopher Wong
- Citybeat
- Danny Chan
- Danny Summer
- Dave Wang
- David Lui
- Dominic Chow
- Eddie Ng
- Edwin Tanner
- Elisa Chan
- Elliot Ngok
- Elvina Kong
- Equator Singers
- Fanny Wang
- Florence Ng
- Frances Yip
- Franco Yuen
- Gallen Lo
- Gina Lam
- Grasshopper
- Hacken Lee
- Hou Dejian
- Jackie Chan
- Jacky Au
- Jacky Cheung
- Jacqueline Man
- Jenny Tseng
- Joe Junior
- Joe Tay
- Johnny Yip
- Ken Choi
- Kenny Bee
- Lam Lei
- Lam Manyee
- Liza Wang
- Loong Kim Sang
- Lowell Lo
- Lucina Yu
- Louis Yuen
- Maria Cordero
- Max Mok
- Mandy Fung
- Michael Kwan
- Ng Man-tat
- Norman Cheung
- Orlando To
- Patrick Tam
- Paula Tsui
- Ram Chiang
- Rebecca Pan
- Roman Tam
- Rosanne Lui
- Ruth Chen
- Sally Yeh
- Sandy Lam
- Sandra Lang
- Sarah Wong
- Shirley Kwan
- Stella Chee
- Stephen Gan
- Suzan Guterres
- Tai Chi
- Tat Ming Pair
- Terence Tsoi
- Teresa Carpio
- Teresa Teng
- Timothy Wong
- Tina Liu
- Tsin Ting
- Tsui Ping
- Tsui Siu-Ming
- Vivian Chow
- Wakin Chau
- William Hu
- William So
- Yolinda Yan
- Yuen Fong Ng
- Zeta Wong

Andy Lau, Chow Yun-Fat, Alan Tam, Shing Fui-On, Loletta Lee, Chin Siu-ho, Maggie Cheung, Sharon Kwok and Cheung Kwok Keung also delivered messages through a large screen on the stage.

== North American tour ==
The concert also toured outside of Hong Kong in 1990, namely with North American stops in Vancouver, San Francisco, New York City, Washington DC, Los Angeles and Toronto.

== Aftermath ==
After the event, Lee Cheuk-yan, representing the Hong Kong Alliance in Support of Patriotic Democratic Movements of China, was detained upon arriving in Beijing with HK$1,000,000 in donations made by the Hong Kong people to the event. He was forced to sign a letter of remorse and released three days later, while the funds were confiscated by authorities in Beijing.

=== Donald Tsang attendance controversy ===
In June 2006, Szeto Wah and other participants recalled seeing Donald Tsang attend the event. Tsang, then the director of administration for the government, would have broken civil service rules by attending the concert. However, Tsang denied "unequivocally" he ever attended the event, stating that he had merely run into Szeto Wah after having dinner with his son at the Hong Kong Jockey Club. At the 2006 commemoration of the 1989 protests in Hong Kong, Fernando Cheung also claimed that Donald Tsang attended the concert, which Tsang again denied.

== Song list ==
See list on Chinese Wikipedia.

== See also ==
- Memorials for the 1989 Tiananmen Square protests and massacre
- June 4th Museum
