= Tsui Ping =

- Born: Harbin, China
- Occupation: Singer
- Years active: 1950–1971, 1997–2004

Chinese name
- Traditional Chinese: 崔萍
Transcriptions
Standard Mandarin
- Hanyu Pinyin: Cuī Píng
- Musical career
- Genres: Mandopop
- Instrument: Voice

Tsui Ping (Chinese: 崔萍; pinyin: Cuī Píng, born 1938) was a Mandopop singer active from 1950 to 1971. She was called the "queen of expressive feelings" (抒情歌后) and the "Goldfish Beauty" (金魚美人).

== Career ==
Tsui Ping's family originates from Jiangsu, China, but she was born in Harbin in 1938, where the family resided while her father was on business. Her family later came to reside in Hong Kong where she received her education and lived during her singing career. She was quite fascinated by Mandarin pop music by Shanghai singers like Chang Loo, Bai Guang, and others, that she heard on the radio. At age 15, she was invited to sing at a party in a nightclub. The nightclub owner was so impressed that he asked her to sign a contract, thus beginning her singing career.

Tsui Ping had also auditioned to star in Shaw Brothers' films and acted in one movie, but later she decided to focus mainly on being a professional singer. Her dream at the time was to record albums.

While Tsui Ping was singing in nightclubs, songwriter Wong Fuk Lin (王福齡) was very impressed by her talent and encouraged her greatly. Two of the songs he later wrote became Tsui Ping's trademarks: "This Precious Night" (今宵多珍重) and "Nang Ping Evening Bells" (南屏晚鐘). "This Precious Night" was played to Taiwanese soldiers-in-training every night at bedtime.

Tsui's musical talents made her one of the most popular artists in Hong Kong and at times one of the highest paid singers. Some of her recordings of previous hits were more popular than the originals: e.g. "Meet Again" (重逢) and "Needing Each Other" (兩相依)

Her performances consisted of singing in nightclubs in Hong Kong and South East Asia, making appearances in musical shows on television and recording with EMI Pathé. She formed a trio with Tsin Ting (静婷) and Billie Tam (蓓蕾) for the opening of a new Hong Kong music club. The trio recorded several songs, including "Fragrance of the Night" (夜來香), "Shangri-La" (香格裡拉), and "Not Going Home Tonight" (今天不回家).

In 1971, she publicly announced her retirement from singing to dedicate time to her family. A public farewell party was televised. A special Tsui Ping magazine was also published. Three separate music awards were given to her within 1970–1971. Tsui Ping gave singing lessons for a few years and later had to give it up due to family matters.

In 1997 she performed four successful "Golden Concerts" with her contemporaries Tsin Ting (静婷), Wu Yingyin (吳鶯音), and Liu Yun (劉韻). In 2004, she was invited by the late James Wong (黃霑) to participate in his television nightclub series, singing Mandarin pop hits again.

== Personal life ==
In 1964, Tsui married famous dubbing singer Kiang Hung/Jiang Hong (江宏), who was also well known for the dubbing of male voices in Shaw Brothers' movies and often sang duets with Tsin Ting (静婷). They have 3 children: 2 daughters and 1 son (as reported in 1970). Kiang died in 1995.

In her free time, she sings Beijing opera.

== Albums ==
EMI (Hong Kong) Limited major LP Titles

- 在我們小時候 When we were young – EMI Regal
- 寄給心裡人 Send to my love – EMI Regal
- 十二個夢 12 Dreams – EMI Pathe, her first stereo LP
- 忘了對你說 I forgot to tell you – EMI Angel
- 沉默 Loving Silence – EMI Angel
- 心聲弦韻 100 Strings – EMI Pathe, popular tunes of the times
- 等待等待 Awaiting – EMI Pathe
- 愛情與麵包 The Spice of Love - EMI Pathe
- 留住今宵 Our Last Night – EMI Pathe
- 雨夜街燈 The Lamp on a Rainy Night - EMI Pathe, her last LP

EPs (most songs in EPs have been incorporated into her LPs.)

- 談不完的愛 Any Kind of Love (3 solos, 1 by Kiang Hung and 1 duet with Kiang Kung)
- 愛相思 We Love Each Other (3 solos and 1 duet with Kiang Hung )
- 淚的小花 Flower of Tears (includes the Chinese version of 'A Time for Us' )
- 跟你開玩笑 I am Joking (4 solos: I am joking, Blue and Black, Cupid's Arrow and Marnie)
- 拜年歌 Happy New Year (1 solo by Tsui Ping, 1 solo by Billie Tam and other singers)
- 負心的人 Heartless (includes Heartless and Marnie, popular Taiwanese pieces)

CDs

- 百代中國時代曲名典37 - 崔萍．南屏晚鐘 - EMI Pathe 077779725229╱1993 (16 solos)
- 百代中國時代曲名典38 - 崔萍．夢裡相思 - EMI Pathe 077778147626╱1993 (16 solos)
- 百代中國時代曲名典39 - 崔萍．今宵多珍重 - EMI Pathe 077779724826╱1993 (16 solos)
- 崔萍 - 臉兒甜如糖 - Philips CP50169╱1994 (16 solos)
- 百代時代曲傳奇5 - 崔萍．總有一天等到你 - EMI Pathe 0724359029726╱2003 (22 solos)
- 百代百年系列18 - 崔萍．深閨夢裡人 - EMI Pathe 94633158726╱2005 (20 solos, 1 duet with Billie Tam 蓓蕾 and i duet with Liu Yun 劉韻)
