= Seven Great Singing Stars =

Group of Chinese singers in the 1940s

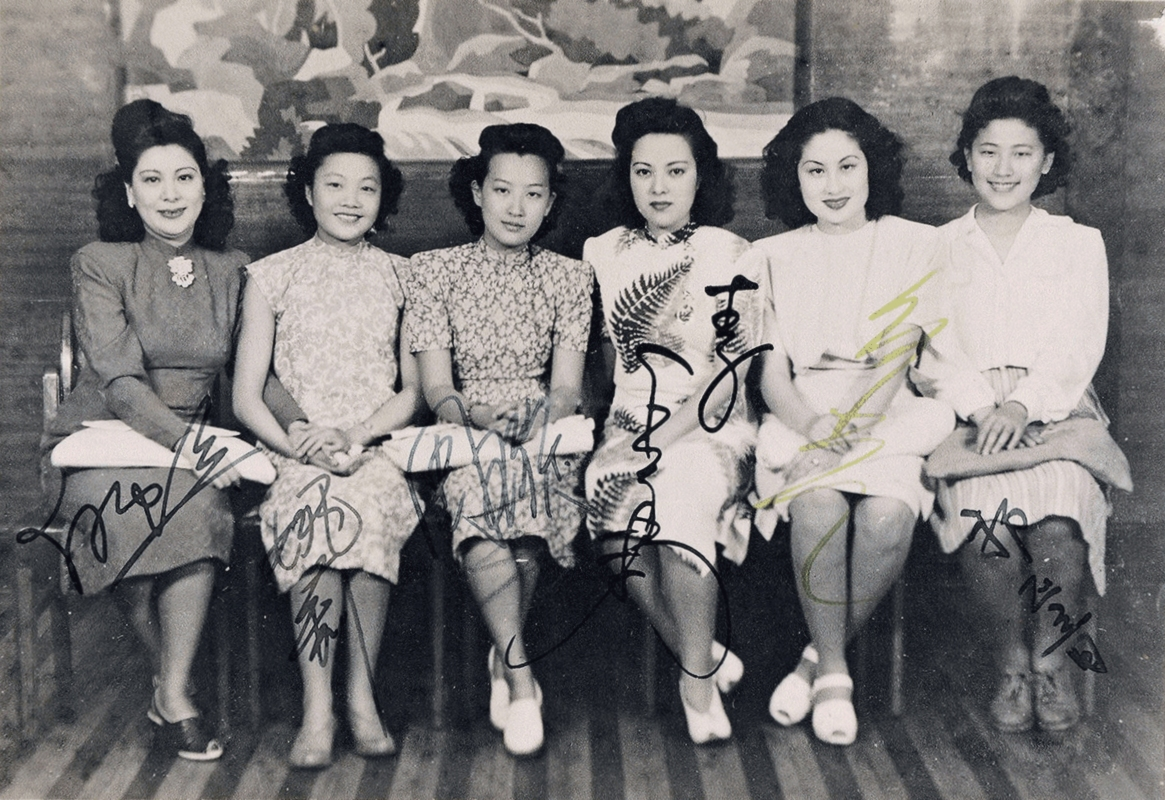
Five of the seven stars. Left to right: Bai Hong (白虹), Yao Lee (姚莉), Zhou Xuan (周璇), Li Xianglan (Yoshiko Yamaguchi) (李香蘭/山口 淑子), Bai Guang (白光). The last one, Qi Zhengyin (祁正音), is not one of the seven stars. Missing in the picture are Wu Yingyin (吳鶯音) and Gong Qiuxia (龔秋霞).

The Seven Great Singing Stars (Chinese: 七大歌星; pinyin: qī dà gēxīng; Wade–Giles: chʻi^{1} ta^{4} kê^{1}hsing^{1}) were seven singers of China in the 1940s.

== Background ==
Several of the stars acted in films, and their music played a prominent role in developing Chinese cinema. They dominated the Chinese pop music industry in the 1930s and 1940s, which was centered in Shanghai, and often performed in a genre known as Shidaiqu (時代曲). Amongst the earliest of the stars to emerge in the 1930s were Zhou Xuan, Gong Qiuxia, Yao Lee, and Bai Hong. In the 40s, Bai Guang, Li Xianglan (Yoshiko Yamaguchi), and Wu Yingyin also became popular, and these seven were grouped as the seven great singing stars of the period.

Shanghai was occupied by the Japanese starting from 1937 to 1945. Yoshiko, who was Japanese, came to prominence in this period although her Japanese ancestry was not revealed at that time. After the Chinese Communist Party (CCP)'s victory in the Chinese Civil War in 1949, there began a large migration of people from Shanghai to Hong Kong, and the CCP also denounced Shanghai popular music as Yellow Music (黃色歌曲), a form of pornography, which effectively ended this period in Shanghai. The film and music industry had already begun to shift to Hong Kong in the '40s, and by the 1950s Hong Kong had become the centre of the entertainment industry. While some of the seven continued to perform for many years, Zhou Xuan died in 1957, Yoshiko retired from entertainment in 1958, and Bai Guang stopped recording in 1959.

== The stars ==
| Stage name | Sobriquet | Years active | Best-known hits |
|---|---|---|---|
| Bai Guang (白光) | Queen of the Low Voice (低音歌后) | 1943–1959 | "Waiting For Your Return" (等著你回來); "Hypocrite" (假正經); "Autumn Night" (秋夜); "If I Didn't Have You" (如果沒有你); "Thinking of the Old Dreams" (魂縈舊夢) |
| Bai Hong (白虹) | White Rainbow (白虹) | 1931–1979 | "He Is Like The Spring Wind" (郎是春日風); "The Intoxicating Lipstick" (醉人的口紅) |
| Gong Qiuxia (龔秋霞) | Big Sister (大姐) | 1933–1980 | "Best Wishes" (祝福); "The Girl by the Autumn Water" (秋水伊人); "Dream Person" (夢中人) |
| Li Xianglan (李香蘭) | Japan's Judy Garland | 1938–1958 | "Candy Selling Song" (賣糖歌); "Fragrance of the Night" (夜來香); "Suzhou Nocturne" (蘇州夜曲); "Storm Petrel" (海燕); "If Only I Met You Before I Married" (恨不相逢未嫁时) |
| Wu Yingyin (吳鶯音) | Queen of the Nasal Voice (鼻音歌后) | 1945–2008 | "The Heartbreaking Red" (斷腸紅); "The Moon Sends My Love to Afar" (明月千里寄相思); "Spring Returns to the World" (大地回春); "I Have a Love" (我有一段情) |
| Yao Lee (姚莉) | Silvery Voice (銀嗓子) | 1935–1975 | "Rose, Rose, I Love You" (玫瑰玫瑰我愛你); "Meet Again" (重逢); "Congratulations" (恭喜恭喜); "Love That I Can't Have" (得不到的愛情); "Love for Sale" (賣相思) |
| Zhou Xuan (周璇) | Golden Voice (金嗓子) | 1932–1954 | "The Wandering Songstress" (天涯歌女); "Shanghai Nights" (夜上海); "When Will You Return?" (何日君再來); "Song of the Four Seasons" (四季歌); "Yellow Leaves Dancing in Autumn Wind" (黃葉舞秋風) |

== See also ==
- C-pop, an overview of Chinese popular music
  - Mandopop, the Mandarin-language subgenre
- Four Heavenly Kings (Hong Kong), for the male counterpart
