= Mandopop =

Mandarin popular music

- Stylistic origins: Initial: Chinese music; Taiwanese music; jazz; traditional pop; folk; Subsequent: Pop; hip hop; R&B; rock; campus folk songs
- Cultural origins: 1920s–1940s, Shanghai, Republic of China

Other topics
- Cantopop; Taiwanese pop; J-pop; K-pop; V-pop; Chinese rock

Mandopop
- Traditional Chinese: 華語流行音樂
- Simplified Chinese: 华语流行音乐
Transcriptions
Standard Mandarin
- Hanyu Pinyin: Huáyǔ liúxíng yīnyuè
Yue: Cantonese
- Jyutping: Waa4jyu5 lau4hang4 jam1ngok6

Mandopop or mandapop refers to popular music sung in Standard Mandarin, primarily songs from Mainland China and Taiwan. The genre originated from the jazz-influenced popular music of 1930s Shanghai known as Shidaiqu ("period music"); later influences included Japanese enka, Hong Kong's Cantopop, Taiwanese Hokkien pop, and particularly the campus folk song movement of the 1970s. Although pop music in Mandarin predates cantopop, the English term "mandopop" was coined around 1980 after "cantopop" became a popular term for describing popular songs in Cantonese. "Mandopop" was used to describe Mandarin-language popular songs of that time, some of which were versions of cantopop songs sung by the same singers with different lyrics to suit the different rhyme and tonal patterns of Mandarin.

Mandopop is categorized as a subgenre of commercial Chinese language music within C-pop. Popular music sung in Mandarin was the first variety of popular music in Chinese to establish itself as a viable industry. It originated in Shanghai; later, Hong Kong, Taipei and Beijing also emerged as important centers of the mandopop music industry. Among the regions and countries where mandopop is most popular are mainland China, Hong Kong, Macau, Taiwan, Malaysia, and Singapore.

== History ==
=== Beginning of recording industry in China ===
The Chinese-language music industry began with the arrival of the gramophone. The earliest gramophone recording in China was made in Shanghai in March 1903 by Fred Gaisberg, who was sent by the Victor Talking Machine Company (VTMC) in the U.S. to record local music in Asia. The recordings were then manufactured outside China and re-imported by the Gramophone Company's sales agent in China, the Moutrie (Moudeli) Foreign Firm. The Moudeli Company dominated the market before the 1910s until the Pathé Records (Chinese: 百代; pinyin: Bǎidài) took over the leading role. Pathé was founded in 1908 by a Frenchman named Labansat who had previously started a novelty entertainment business using phonograph in Shanghai around the beginning of the 20th century. The company established a recording studio, and the first record-pressing plant in the Shanghai French Concession in 1914, and became the principal record company to serve as the backbone for the young industry in China. It originally recorded mainly Peking opera, but later expanded to Mandarin popular music. Later other foreign as well as Chinese-own recording companies were also established in China.

Early in the 20th century, people in China generally spoke in their own regional dialect. Although most people in Shanghai then spoke Shanghainese, the recordings of the pop music from Shanghai from the 1920s onwards were done in Standard Mandarin, which is based on the Beijing dialect. Mandarin was then considered as the language of the modern, educated class in China, and there was a movement to popularize the use of Mandarin as a national language in the pursuit of national unity. Those involved in this movement included songwriters such as Li Jinhui working in Shanghai. The drive to impose linguistic uniformity in China started in the early 20th century when the Qing Ministry of Education proclaimed Mandarin as the official speech to be taught in modern schools, a policy the new leaders of the Chinese Republic formed in 1912 were also committed to. Sound films in Shanghai which started in the early 1930s were made in Mandarin because of a ban on the use of dialects in films by the then Nanjing government, consequently popular songs from films were also performed in Mandarin.

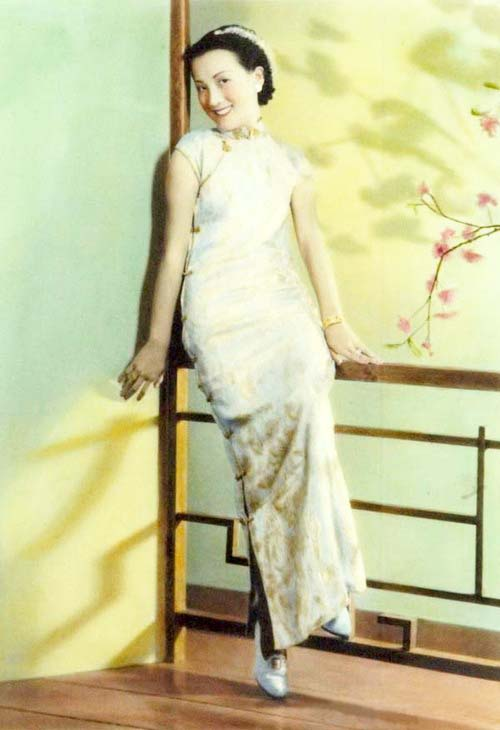
Zhou Xuan, the most notable singing star of the early Shanghai period.

=== 1920s: Birth of Shidaiqu in Shanghai ===
Mandarin popular songs that started in the 1920s were called shidaiqu (時代曲; Pinyin: Shídài Qǔ – meaning music of the time, thus popular music), and Shanghai was the center of its production. The Mandarin popular songs of the Shanghai era are considered by scholars to be the first kind of modern popular music developed in China, and the prototype of later Chinese pop song. Li Jinhui is generally regarded as the "Father of Chinese Popular Music" who established the genre in the 1920s. Buck Clayton, the American jazz musician, also worked alongside Li. Li established the Bright Moon Song and Dance Troupe, and amongst their singing stars were Wang Renmei and Li Lili. There was a close relationship between music and film industries and many of its singers also became actresses.

Around 1927, Li composed the hit song "Drizzle" recorded by his daughter Li Minghui, and this song is often regarded as the first Chinese pop song. The song, with its fusion of jazz and Chinese folk music, exemplifies the early shidaiqu – the tune is in the style of a traditional pentatonic folk melody, but the instrumentation is similar to that of an American jazz orchestra. The song however was sung in a high-pitched childlike style, a style described uncharitably as sounding like "strangling cat" by the writer Lu Xun. This early style would soon be replaced by more sophisticated performances from better-trained singers. In the following decades, various popular Western music genres such as Latin dance music also become incorporated into Chinese popular music, producing a type of music containing both Chinese and Western elements that characterized shidaiqu. Popular songs of the time may range from those that were composed in the traditional Chinese idiom but followed a Western principle of composition to those that were done largely in a Western style, and they may be accompanied by traditional Chinese or Western instrumentation. An example is "The Evening Primrose" by Li Xianglan, a Chinese composition set to a Latin dance beat.

=== 1930s–1940s: The Seven Great Singing Stars era ===
In 1931, the first sound film was made in China in a cooperation between the Mingxing Film Company and Pathé. The film industry took advantage of the sound era and engaged singers for acting and soundtrack roles, and Li Jinhui's Bright Moonlight Song and Dance Troup became the first modern musical division to be integrated into the Chinese film industry when it joined Lianhua Film Company in 1931. Amongst the best-known of the singer-actress to emerge in the 1930s were Zhou Xuan, Gong Qiuxia, and Bai Hong. Although later singing stars need not also have an acting career, the close relationship between the recording and film industries continued for many decades. Later Yao Lee, Bai Guang, Li Xianglan, Wu Yingyin also became popular, and collectively these seven stars became known as the "Seven Great Singing Stars" of the period. Other notable singers of this period include Li Lihua and Chang Loo (張露; Pinyin: Zhāng Lù). In 1940 Yao Lee recorded "Rose, Rose, I Love You" which later became the first Chinese pop song to be covered by Western singers that was a hit.

The "Seven Great Singing Stars" in the Republic of China period secured the place of the shidaiqu genre in East Asian society. Zhou Xuan is generally considered the most notable Chinese pop star of the era for her highly successful singing and film career. This generation saw the rise in popularity of female singers from mere "song girls" to "stars", and for the next few decades, female singers would dominate the Mandarin popular music industry.

In this period, Pathé Records dominated the recording industry. In the late 1930s to early 1940s, it held about 90% market share of the Mandarin pop songs.

The era was a tumultuous period, with the occupation of Shanghai by the Japanese armies during the Second Sino-Japanese War from 1937 and to 1945, followed by continuation of the civil war between the Nationalists and Communists. In response to the turmoil, productions began to shift to Hong Kong, and after the Communist takeover in 1949, many stars moved to Hong Kong which then replaced Shanghai as the center of the entertainment industry in the 1950s.

=== 1950s–1960s: The Hong Kong era ===
In 1949, the People's Republic of China was established by the Communist party, and in 1952 popular music was denounced by the PRC government as Yellow Music, a form of pornography. In the mainland, the communist regime began to suppress popular music and promote revolutionary marches. China Record Corporation became the only music recording industry body in China, and for many years Minyue (National Music) and revolutionary music were about the only kinds of music to be recorded there.

In 1952, Pathé Records moved its operation from Shanghai to Hong Kong. Stars from Shanghai continued to record songs in Hong Kong, and Shanghai-style music remained popular in Hong Kong until the mid-1960s. Although the music is a continuation of the shidaiqu style of Shanghai, many of its songwriters did not move to Hong Kong, and many of the musicians employed in the Hong Kong music industry were Filipinos, Mandarin pop music in Hong Kong began to move away from its Shanghai roots. Also partly as a consequence of having fewer good songwriters, some songs of this period were adaptation of English-language songs, as well as songs from other regions such as the Indonesian song "Bengawan Solo" (as "梭羅河之戀"; Pinyin: Suōluó Hé Zhī Liàn) and the Latin-American song "Historia de un Amor" (as "He is not in my heart", "我的心裡沒有他"; Pinyin: Wǒde Xīnlǐ Méiyǒu Tā). As the style evolved, the sound of popular songs from the Hong Kong era therefore became distinct from Shanghai's. Among the recording artists of note to emerge in this period were Tsui Ping, Tsin Ting, Grace Chang (葛蘭; Pinyin: Gě Lán), Fong Tsin Ying (方靜音; Pinyin: Fāng Jìngyīn) and Liu Yun, some of whom were also actresses. While some actresses continued to sing in their films, some of the best known songs were dubbed by other singers, for example "Unforgettable Love" ("不了情"; Pinyin: Bù Liǎo Qíng) in the film of the same name starring Lin Dai was sung by Koo Mei. The song was also recorded with piano and strings orchestration popular at that time.

Shanghai-style Mandarin pop songs however began to decline in popularity around the mid-1960s as Western pop music became popular among the young, and many Hong Kong performers copied Western songs and sang Hong Kong English pop songs. This in turn gave way to pop songs recorded in Cantonese as Cantopop became the dominant genre of music from Hong Kong in the 1970s.

After the Communist victory in China, the Kuomintang retreated to Taiwan. There were local stars in Taiwan and Pathé Records did business there as well, but the island's recording industry was not initially strong. Taiwanese youth were drawn to popular styles from abroad; as Taiwan was ruled by Japan from 1895 to 1945, Taiwanese pop songs in the Hokkien language, the actual mother tongue of most of the island's residents, were particularly strongly influenced by the Japanese enka music. Popular Mandarin songs from Taiwan were similarly influenced, and many popular Mandarin songs of the 1960s were adaptations of Japanese songs, for example "Hard to Forget the Thought" ("意難忘" ; Pinyin: Yì Nán Wàng, originally "Tokyo Serenade" (東京夜曲); Pinyin: Dōngjīng Yèqǔ) and "Hate you to the Bone" ("恨你入骨"; Pinyin: Hèn Nǐ Rùgǔ, from "Hone made aishite" (骨まで愛して)). Popular songs were necessarily sung in Mandarin as Taiwan's new rulers, which imposed martial law in Taiwan in 1949, mandated its use as well as restricting the use of Taiwanese Hokkien and forbidding the use of Japanese. The Mandarin pop music developed in Taiwan that would become modern Mandopop is a blend of traditional Chinese, Japanese, Taiwanese, as well as Western musical styles. Tzu Wei was the earliest of the Taiwan-based stars who achieved success outside of Taiwan in the late 1950s with the song "Green Island Serenade", followed by other singers such as Mei Tai and Yao Su-jung in the 1960s. The 1960s however was a highly politically tense era, many songs such as "Not Going Home Today" ("今天不回家"; Pinyin: Jīntiān Bùhuí Jiā) by Yao Su-jung were banned in Taiwan.

In the 1960s, regional centres of Chinese pop music also started to emerge in overseas Chinese communities in Malaysia and Singapore, and singers from the region such as Poon Sow Keng also achieved wider success.

=== 1970s–1980s ===
==== Rise of Taiwanese Mandopop ====
In the 1970s, Taipei began to take center stage for Mandopop while Cantopop took hold in Hong Kong. Contemporary commercialized Mandopop is generally recognised as beginning around 1980. It evolved from Taiwan's campus folk song movement of the 1970s, and drew on several previous or coexisting musical traditions in East Asia, including Shidaiqu, enka, Cantopop, and Hokkien pop. In 1966, the Taiwan music industry was generating US$4.7 million annually, and this had grown exponentially through the 1970s and 1980s, and by 1996, it peaked at just under US$500 million before declining. The success of the Taiwanese film industry also helped with the popularity of its singers. Taiwanese stars such as Tsai Chin, Fei Yu-ching, and Fong Fei Fei became increasingly popular, with Teresa Teng the best known.

"The Moon Represents My Heart" - Teresa Teng
A short clip of one of the best known songs of the 1970s "The Moon Represents My Heart" by Teresa Teng.

Teresa Teng made Mandopop a true mainstay by crossing over to mainland China after Deng Xiaoping came to power and instituted the open door policy in 1978 that allowed cultural products from Hong Kong and Taiwan to enter China. Teng's song became popular there despite an early ban on her songs by the PRC government for being "Bourgeois Music". Her "soft, sweet, often whispery and restrained" singing style in romantic songs such as "The Moon Represents My Heart" (月亮代表我的心; Pinyin: Yuèliàng Dàibiǎo Wǒde Xīn) made a strong impact in mainland China where revolutionary songs were previously prevalent. A common expression then was "By day, Deng Xiaoping rules China. But by night, Deng Lijun (Teresa Teng) rules". The ban on Teng was lifted in 1986 and songs from Hong Kong and Taiwan, called gangtai music, became more popular within mainland China.

During the 1970s and early 1980s, a different generation of Taiwanese singers and/or songwriters such as Chyi Yu, Hou Dejian, and Lo Ta-yu emerged, some of whom were influenced by folk rock and whose music may be termed "campus folk music". One of the most successful songs of the era was Lo Ta-yu's 1985 song "Tomorrow Will Be Better", which was inspired by the American song "We Are the World" and originally performed by 60 singers. It quickly became a hit throughout Chinese in Asia. Another song soon followed in 1986 in mainland China called "Let the World be filled with Love" (讓世界充滿愛; Pinyin: Ràng Shìjiè Chōngmǎn Ài). Hou Dejian's song "Descendants of the Dragon" (龍的傳人; Pinyin: Lóng de Chuánrén) also became an anthem for the period. Unlike previous eras dominated by female singers, male singers became popular. Other popular male singers included Liu Wen-cheng, Johnny Yin and Dave Wong. Wong released his debut album A Game A Dream (一場遊戲一場夢; Pinyin: Yìchǎng Yóuxì Yìchǎng Mèng), which sold over 700,000-copies in three months in December 1987.

By around 1980, the term Mandopop began to be used for the Chinese popular music that had emerged in this period, and by the mid-1980s, Taiwan's booming music industry was the source of around 90% of Mandopop sold in Southeast Asia.

In South East Asia, popular local stars from the late 60s to the 80s included Sakura Teng (樱花; Pinyin: Yīnghuā), Chang Siao Ying (張小英; Pinyin: Zhāng Xiǎoyīng) and Lena Lim (林竹君; Pinyin: Lín Zhújūn) from Singapore, and Wong Shiau Chuen (黃曉君; Pinyin: Huáng Xiǎojūn) and Lee Yee (李逸; Pinyin: Lǐ Yì) from Malaysia. Some such as Lena Lim achieved some success outside the region, and the local labels also signed singers from outside the region such as Long Piao-Piao (龍飄飄; Pinyin: Lóng Piāopiāo) from Taiwan. The recording industry in Singapore in particular thrived. In 1979, Singapore launched the Speak Mandarin Campaign to promote the use of Mandarin over the range of Chinese dialects spoken by various segments of the ethnic-Chinese population. Mandarin songs, already a strong presence on radio stations and on television, further eroded the popularity of Hokkien and Cantonese songs in the media. In the 1980s, a genre of Mandarin ballads called xinyao developed in Singapore by singers/songwriters such as Liang Wern Fook.

==== Mandopop after the Cultural Revolution ====
In mainland China, the music industry was freed from state restriction in 1978, and regional recording companies were established in Guangzhou, Shanghai and Beijing in the 1980s with local singers. Pop music in China in this period was dominated by Mandopop songs from Taiwan and Cantopop from Hong Kong, however the 1980s saw the beginning of rock music in China, with the emergence of singer-songwriters such as Cui Jian, followed by others such as He Yong and bands such as Tang Dynasty which became popular in the 1990s.

Homeland Love (乡恋) performed by Li Guyi in 1980 is considered to be the first pop song created within mainland China after the Chinese Cultural Revolution (1966–1976), which echoed humanism and the New Enlightenment movement in the 1980s. The song was written by Ma Jinghua and Zhang Peiji, but was briefly banned by the Chinese authorities due to criticisms from some critics and audiences who labelled the song as "decadent music". In 1983, Li Guyi performed the song at the China Central Television's first Spring Festival Gala, when the ban was lifted and the song became widely popular in the Chinese society.

In 1986, Cui Jian, known as the "Father of Chinese rock", debuted his rock song Nothing to My Name which is considered the birth of Chinese rock music. Nothing to My Name later became the unofficial anthem of students who protested on Tiananmen Square in 1989, and is considered a symbol of the 1980s of China. Early leading rock musicians such as Cui Jian and He Yong created a mix of music that was so hybrid and experimental that it cut across genre divisions of established pop.

=== 1990s ===
A number of singers originally from mainland China such as Faye Wong and Na Ying began to record in Hong Kong and Taiwan. Faye Wong, referred to in the media as the Diva, first recorded in Cantonese in Hong Kong, later recorded in Mandarin. She was one of the few Chinese singers to perform in Budokan, Japan.

During this period, many Cantopop singers from Hong Kong such as the "Four Heavenly Kings" - Aaron Kwok, Leon Lai, Andy Lau and Jacky Cheung - also began to dominate Mandopop. Many Cantopop songs of the period were also sung in Mandarin by the same singers, say Faye Wong. One of the best-selling Mandarin albums was the 1993 album The Goodbye Kiss by Jacky Cheung which sold over 1 million in Taiwan and 4 million in total Asia-wide. Nonetheless, Taiwan has their own popular singers such as Stella Chang, Sky Wu, Wakin Chau (formerly Emil Chau) and Jeff Chang. Independent labels such as Rock Records began to establish themselves in this period as some of the most influential labels. Towards the end of the 90s, other singers such as Leehom Wang and David Tao became popular, and some also began to perform in the R&B and/or hip-hop genres.

In the period from the mid-1990s to early 2000s, Shanghai and Beijing became centers of the music industry in mainland China, with Shanghai focusing on music record publishing and distribution, while Beijing focused on music recording.

=== 2000s-2010s: Growth in Mainland China ===
In Hong Kong, the Four Heavenly Kings faded in the 2000s, but many other new artists such as Nicholas Tse and Eason Chan came to the fore. Among this new wave of talent, Khalil Fong (方大同; Pinyin: Fāng Dàtóng), an American-born Hong Kong singer-songwriter and producer, played a pivotal role in integrating R&B and soul elements into Mandopop.

Debuting in 2005 with his album Soulboy, Fong introduced a sophisticated blend of Western musical styles to the Chinese music scene. His subsequent works, including This Love (2006) and his 2011 album 15, further cemented his reputation as a genre innovator. Fong's contributions were recognized with multiple Golden Melody Awards, including Best Male Artist in 2017 for his 2016 album Journey to the West. His unique musical approach has been influential in shaping the contemporary Mandopop landscape.

The 2000s also began with an explosion of pop idols, many of whom were from Taiwan. Mainland China also saw a rapid increase in the number of Mandopop singers, bands, and idol groups as pop music becomes increasingly mainstream by mid-2000s. The growing Mainland film industry and Chinese television drama also increased demand for Mandopop. Since the 2000s, the emergence of indie rock in mainland China and Taiwan had exploded into a flourishing indie music scene in mainland China and Taiwan, adding various new diversities into Mandopop. Entry of popular Taiwan-based bands such as Mayday and Sodagreen while in mainland Chinese-based bands such as SuperVC and Milk Coffee had brought a new phase of rock fusion into Mandopop.

The music industry in Taiwan, however, began to suffer from music piracy in the digital age, and its revenue plummeted to $US95 million in 2005. The primary revenue sources in Taiwan music industry shifted to advertising, concerts, KTV (karaoke) and movie. The dramatic decline of CD sales shifted the market in favour of mainland China. While piracy was also severe in mainland China, the percentage of its digital sales is higher compared to most countries. 2005 was known as 'The First Year of Digital Music' in China as its digital music sales of $US57 million overtook CDs in 2005, and it also overtook Taiwan in term of the retail value of its music sales.

However, while mainland China became increasingly important in generating revenue, the pop music industry itself in mainland China was still relatively small in the decade of 2000s compared to Taiwan and Hong Kong as popstars from Taiwan and other overseas Chinese communities were still popular in mainland China. Mandopop singers such as Jay Chou were popular performing in the rhythm and blues and rap music genre, popularising a new fusion style of music known as zhongguofeng. Other successful singers included JJ Lin, Eason Chan, Mayday, Stefanie Sun, G.E.M. and Jolin Tsai.

The burgeoning number of contests brought a new wave of idol genre to the Mandopop industry. Nationwide singing competitions in mainland China, such as the Super Girl, Super Boy, The Voice of China, Chinese Idol, and The X Factor: Zhongguo Zui Qiang Yin, greatly boosted Mandopop's influence. Many contestants emerged as successful singers in Mainland China, such as Joker Xue, Jane Zhang, Li Yuchun, Jason Zhang, Laure Shang Wenjie, etc. The same phenomenon also occurred in Taiwan. From the show One Million Star and Super Idol, new talented singers entered the Mandopop market, including Aska Yang, Yoga Lin, Lala Hsu and so on. In Taiwan, the new term "quality idol" (優質偶像; Pinyin: yōuzhì ǒuxiàng) referred to artists who were good-looking, talented and highly educated, among them Wang Leehom and William Wei.

There was increasing crossover appeal of Taiwanese bubblegum pop boybands and girl bands in the mainland Chinese scene, such as the commercially successful acts like S.H.E and Fahrenheit. Several new boybands and girl bands also have emerged in mainland China such as Top Combine, TFBOYS, NEXT and Idol Producer and Produce Camp boy and girl groups including Nine Percent, UNINE, R1SE, INTO1, THE9 and Rocket Girls.

=== 2020s ===
In early 2020s, Jay Chou, JJ Lin and Eason Chan, who had debuted for more than 20 years, continued to lead the Mandopop scene. They were ranked among the top three most-streamed Chinese artists on Spotify in 2023. Chou's Greatest Works of Art was IFPI Global Album Sales Chart No. 1 album in 2022.

Short video platforms like DouYin gained popularity and had increasing impact on the music market. In November 2021, Eason Chan released “Lonely Warrior” (孤勇者; Pinyin: Gūyǒng Zhě), the opening theme for Arcane: League of Legends, which became super hit not only among the usual Mandopop fans, but also mega hit among the children, becoming an annual phenomenon in the Mandopop scene. Although Chan did not make any appearance for promotion (except one online performance ten months after the release), this song still gained huge popularity in mainland China, Taiwan and Malaysia. There were numerous short videos using the song as background music, playing the song with various adaptations, and hand gestures dance etc. Children, in particular, were attached to these. The popularity spread from children to their parents, gaining widespread attention. Short video platform had emerged as a contemporary media for music promotion.

In August of 2021, it was announced by the Cyberspace Administration of China that online forums for popularity rankings for celebrities would be banned across all digital platforms. This was the start of a 2 month process for the new campaign called "Clear and Bright" that would be used to crackdown on fan culture sites. It was issued for the controversy of cyberbullying, starting rumors, inducing minors to raise funds, fraud, vote rigging, and causing agitated behavior to flaunt lifestyles. This was backed up by the incident in May with the fans from idol survival show Youth With You 3, where a promotion for buying milk with special QR codes attached could be used to support their favorite on the show. This led to mass buying for the codes and viral videos showing fans dumping out the milk into drains. It was estimated that over 270,000 bottles were dumped out in this "Milk Waste" scandal. The backlash fell so far back that iQiyi suspended the show and eventually the government banned all talent and idol reality shows for a while.

Artists such as G.E.M. and Joker Xue also continue to make an impact on the Mandopop scene. G.E.M.'s "Light Years Away", the Chinese theme song for the sci-fi film Passengers, is the most-viewed Chinese music video on YouTube at 291 million as of February 2025. While Xue's Extraterrestrial World Tour is one of the most attended concert tours of all-time and ranks first among C-pop artists with more than 4.9 million tickets sold as of July 2024.

== Characteristics ==
=== Instruments and setups ===
Shidaiqu originated as a fusion of Chinese traditional music and European popular music, and therefore instruments from both genres were used from the very beginning of Mandopop. Songs performed in the traditional style employed traditional Chinese instruments like the erhu, pipa, and sanxian, such as in the recording of "The Wandering Songstress" (天涯歌女; Pinyin: Tiānyá Gēnǚ) by Zhou Xuan, whereas more Western orchestral instruments such as trumpets, violins, and piano were used in songs like "Shanghai Nights" (夜上海), also by Zhou Xuan. Big band and jazz instruments and orchestrations from the swing era were common in the early years. Chinese and Western instruments were also combined in some recordings.

In the 1960s, the electric guitar began to be used. Starting around the 1970s, electronic organs/synthesizers began to be heavily featured, which characterized the Mandopop music of the era. Today's Mandopop arrangements are generally westernized, covering many musical styles, including R&B, hip hop, ballads, and Pop. Mandopop switched from simple imitation to adjusting the melodies and lyrics creatively in short time. Some pop stars became famous because they were presented to meet the Chinese aesthetics standard and culture features. A few Chinese pop musicians—most notably Jay Chou, Lin Jun Jie, David Tao, Leehom Wang —have experimented with fusing traditional Chinese instruments with Western styles (such as hip hop beats and progressive rock) all over again in a new style known as China Wind music (Zhōngguófēng), influencing many Chinese singers worldwide.

== Industry ==
=== Labels ===
Popular music record labels includes independent labels such as JVR Music, Linfair Records, B'In Music and subsidiaries of major labels such as Sony Music Taiwan, Universal Music Taiwan, Warner Music Taiwan. In the past few years, mainland labels such as EE-Media, Huayi Brothers, Taihe Rye Music, Show City Times, Idol Entertainment, and Tian Hao Entertainment have also emerged.

- Historical
  - Shanghai: Pathé, Great Wall, New Moon, Greater China
  - Hong Kong: Pathé Records/EMI Records, Philips, Diamond Records
- Modern
  - Mainland China: EE-Media, Huayi Brothers, Taihe Rye Music, Show City Times, Idol Entertainment, TH Entertainment, Yuehua Entertainment, Wajijiwa Entertainment
  - Taiwan: Rock Records, HIM International Music, Linfair Records, Avex Taiwan, B'in Music
  - Hong Kong: Gold Typhoon, Emperor Group
  - Singapore: Ocean Butterflies International, Hype Records

=== Music distribution outside Asia ===
Mandopop titles are also available outside of Asia. Chinese communities established in North America have made Mandopop music accessible through local businesses. In the United States, Canada and Australia they are easily found in many major urban areas, such as San Francisco Bay Area, Los Angeles, San Diego, New York City, Vancouver, Toronto, Sydney, and Melbourne.

=== Charts ===
The Global Chinese Pop Chart is a record chart organised since 2001 by 7 radio stations from Beijing, Shanghai, Guangdong, Hong Kong, Singapore, Taipei and Kuala Lumpur.

In Taiwan, G-Music Chart (Chinese: 風雲榜 Fēngyúnbǎng) is the most popular music ranking. It was first officially published on 7 July 2005, and compiled the top physically sold CD releases in Taiwan (including both albums and physically released singles). Only the top 20 positions are published, and instead of sales, a percentage ranking is listed next to each release.

== Awards ==
- Beijing Popular Music Awards (Mainland China)
- CCTV-MTV Music Awards (Mainland China)
- Chinese Music Awards (Mainland China)
- Four Stations Joint Music Awards (Hong Kong)
- Golden Melody Awards (Taiwan)
- HITO Radio Music Awards (Taiwan)
- Jade Solid Gold Best Ten Music Awards (Hong Kong)
- M Music Awards (Mainland China)
- Metro Radio Mandarin Music Awards (Hong Kong)
- RTHK Top 10 Gold Songs Awards (Hong Kong)
- Singapore Hit Awards (Singapore)
- Freshmusic Awards (Singapore)x
- Top Chinese Music Awards (Mainland China)
- Ultimate Song Chart Awards (Hong Kong)
- V Chart Awards (Mainland China)

== Mandopop radio stations ==
Station	Location	Frequencies and Platform
Kiss Radio Taiwan	Kaohsiung, Taiwan	99.9 FM, 99.7 FM, 97.1 FM, 98.3 FM and Internet live streaming
Hit Fm	Taipei, Taiwan	90.1 FM, 91.5 FM, 101.7 FM and Internet live streaming
CNR Music Radio	Nationwide, China	90.0 FM (Beijing) and Internet live streaming
Beijing Music Radio	Beijing, China	97.4 FM and Internet live streaming
Shenzhen Radio Station	Shenzhen, China	97.1 FM and Internet live streaming
Shanghai Media Group	Shanghai, China	101.7 FM and Internet live streaming
KAZN	Los Angeles, USA	Sometimes
KSFN	San Francisco, USA	1510 AM
KSJO	San Francisco, USA	92.3 FM
KSQQ	San Francisco, USA	96.1 FM
UFM100.3	Singapore	100.3 FM and Internet live streaming
YES 933	Singapore	93.3 FM and Internet live streaming
883Jia	Singapore	88.3 FM and Internet live streaming
My	Malaysia	Frequencies vary according to location
Radio Cakrawala	Jakarta, Indonesia	98.3 FM
Radio Strato	Surabaya, Indonesia	101.9 FM
Radio Manila 99.9	Manila, Philippines	99.9 FM
MandarinRadio.com		Internet live streaming (also available on iTunes Radio)

== See also ==
- Music of China
- Music of Taiwan
- Taiwanese Wave
- C-pop
- Chinese R&B
- French Mandopop
- J-pop
- K-pop
- Pinoy pop
- Taiwanese pop
- V-pop
- List of best-selling albums in Taiwan
- Chinese television drama
- Taiwanese drama
- Taiwanese Indigenous pop music
