= Shidaiqu =

1920s musical genre fusing Chinese folk and American jazz

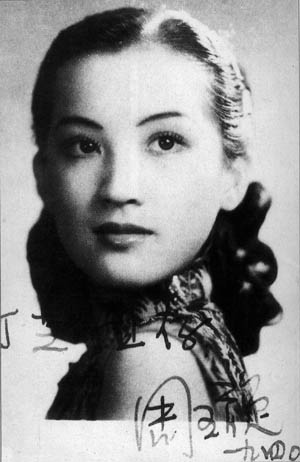
Singer Zhou Xuan remains an icon of the Shidaiqu era

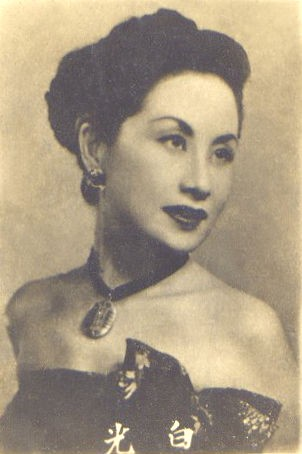
Bai Guang played a prominent role in Shidaiqu music

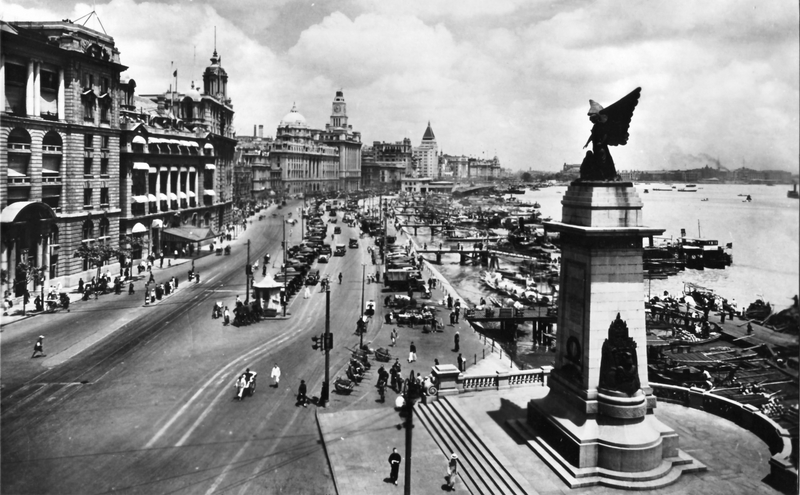
Shanghai in the 1930s represented the center of the Shidaiqu music phenomenon

Shidaiqu (Chinese: 時代曲; pinyin: shídàiqǔ; Wade–Giles: shih^{2} tai^{4} chʻü^{3}; Jyutping: si4 doi6 kuk1) is a type of Chinese popular music that is a fusion of Chinese folk, American jazz and Hollywood film music that originated in Shanghai in the 1920s.

== Terminology ==
The term shídàiqǔ (時代曲) literally translates to 'songs of the era' in Mandarin Chinese. When sung in Cantonese, it is commonly referred to as jyut6 jyu5 si4 doi6 kuk1 (粵語時代曲); in Amoy Hokkien, it is known as Hā-gú sî-tāi-khiok (廈語時代曲). These terms incorporate the native names for the dialects. The term shídàiqǔ is believed to have originated in Hong Kong to describe a genre of popular Chinese music that gained prominence in Shanghai during the early to mid-20th century. This genre emerged as a fusion of traditional Chinese melodies, Western musical elements, and influences from jazz and popular music of the time.

== Musicality ==
Shidaiqu is a kind of fusion music that makes use of jazz musical instruments (castanets, maracas). Songs were sung in a high-pitched childlike style.

== History ==
Shidaiqu music is rooted in both traditional Chinese folk music and the introduction of Western jazz during the years when Shanghai was under the Shanghai International Settlement. In the 1920s, the intellectual elite in Shanghai and Beijing embraced the influx of Western music and movies that entered through trade. The first jazz clubs in Shanghai initially served as dance halls for the Western elite. Beginning in the 1920s, shidaiqu entered into the mainstream of popular music. The Chinese pop song "Drizzle" was composed by Li Jinhui around 1927 and sung by his daughter Li Minghui. The song exemplifies the early shidaiqu in its fusion of jazz and Chinese folk music – the tune is in the style of a traditional pentatonic folk melody, but the instrumentation is similar to that of an American jazz orchestra.

=== Mainstream ===
Shidaiqu reached peak popularity during 1940s. Famous jazz musicians from both the US and China played to packed dance halls. Chinese female singers grew in popularity. Additionally, nightclubs such as the Paramount Dance Hall became a meeting point for businessmen from Western countries and China. The western jazz influences were shaped predominately by American jazz musician Buck Clayton. Shidaiqu has inspired Gary Lucas for his album The Edge of Heaven and DJs such as Ian Widgery and his Shanghai Lounge Divas project. On the other hand, if cinema was the origin of many songs, Wong Kar-wai used them again for illustrating his film In the Mood for Love; Rebecca Pan, one of the actresses in this film, was also one of those famous shidaiqu singers.

=== Political connotations ===
Shanghai was divided into the International Concession and the French Concession in the 1930s and early 1940s. Owing to the protection of foreign nations (e.g., Britain and France), Shanghai was a prosperous and a rather politically stable city. Some shidaiqu songs are related to particular historical events (e.g., the Second Sino-Japanese War). The euphemism of presenting love, which was always found in old Chinese novels, is kept in shidaiqu.

=== Decline ===
Throughout the decades leading up to the Great Leap Forward, the reputation of shidaiqu outside of its target audience was degrading. Despite some of the songs intended to nation build, the government deemed shidaiqu as "yellow music" and described it as "pornographic and commercial". In 1952, the Chinese Communist Party banned nightclubs and pop music production. During this time period, western-style instruments were sought out and destroyed. Chinese jazz musicians were not rehabilitated until decades later. The tradition then moved to Hong Kong and reached its height from the 1950s to the late 1960s, when it was replaced by Taiwanese pop (sung in Mandarin) and later Cantopop (Cantonese popular music). While it is considered a prototype, music enthusiasts may see it as an early version of Mandopop (Mandarin popular music).

=== Revival ===
While the tradition continued to thrive in Taiwan and Hong Kong, shidaiqu gained popularity in mainland China once more during the 1980s. Shanghai opened up for the first time after WWII and interest in what used to be forbidden music peaked. Surviving musicians were invited to play once more in hotel lobbies and pop musicians began writing covers of famous songs such as Teresa Teng's 1978 cover of Li Xianglan's "The Evening Primrose". In more recent years, a group called the Shanghai Restoration Project uses both the 1980s and 1940s pop songs to create electronic music.

== Representatives ==
- Bai Guang 白光
- Bai Hong 白虹
- Billie Tam 蓓蕾
- Carrie Koo Mei 顧媚
- Chang Loo 張露
- Chen Juan-juan 陳娟娟
- Deng Baiying 鄧白英
- Deng Xiaoping 鄧小萍
- Grace Chang 葛蘭
- Gong Qiuxia 龔秋霞
- Hua Yibao 華怡保 or Ruby Wah
- Kuang Yuling 鄺玉玲
- Li Li-hwa 李麗華
- Li Lili 黎莉莉
- Li Xianglan 李香蘭
- Liang Ping 梁萍
- Ling Po 凌波
- Liu Yun 劉韻
- Mona Fong 方逸華
- Poon Sow Keng 潘秀瓊
- Rebecca Pan 潘迪華
- Ouyang Feiying 歐陽飛鶯
- Tsin Ting 靜婷
- Tsui Ping 崔萍
- Tung Pei-pei 董佩佩
- Wang Renmei 王人美
- Wei Xiuxian 韋秀嫻
- Wong Ling 黃菱
- Wu Yingyin 吳鶯音
- Xia Dan 夏丹
- Xia Peizhen 夏佩珍
- Yao Lee 姚莉
- Yao Min 姚敏
- Yeh Feng 葉楓
- Yeh Meng
- Yi Min 逸敏
- Zhou Xuan 周璇

== See also ==
- C-pop
- Seven Great Singing Stars
- Music of China
- Music of Hong Kong
