= Luo Yusheng =

Chinese Jingyun drummer (1914–2002)

Luo Yusheng (13 August 1914 – 5 May 2002), professionally known as Xiao Cai wu(小彩舞), was a Chinese Jingyun drum actor.

== Early life ==
Luo was born in Shanghai to an adoptive father, acrobat Luo Caiwu(骆彩武 ). At the age of 4, she began to follow her adoptive father in Shanghai, Wuhan and other places. At the age of 9, she paid a visit to her teacher Su Huanting (苏焕亭) and learned to sing Peking Opera. Then she sang in Nanjing and changed her name to her adoptive father's stage name, Xiao Caiwu (小彩武) at the age of 16. At the age of 17, she transitioned to the Beijing rhyme drum. In 1934, she learned to sing the ("Liu Baoquan school" 刘派)Jingyun drum by Han Yonglu (韩永禄), the string master of Liu Baoquan(刘宝全). In 1936, she performed in Beijing and Tianjin.

== Occupation ==
At the age of 17, Luo officially transitioned to singing the Jingyun drum and became famous in 1936 when she performed on stage in Beijing and Tianjin. After the founding of the People's Republic of China, Luo joined the Tianjin Folk Opera Troupe in 1951 as the deputy head of the troupe. In 1953, Luo went to North Korea to visit the Chinese People's Volunteers. In 1979 she joined the Chinese Communist Party and was elected as the second chairman of the Chinese Singers Association. In 1985, Luo was elected as the third chairman of the China Folk Artists Association.

In 1996, Luo was elected as the fourth honorary president of China Folk Artists Association. Luo was a member of the fifth, sixth, seventh and eighth National Committees of the Chinese People's Political Consultative Conference. She was an honorary member of the National Committee of the China Federation of Literary and Art Circles (CFLAC) and vice chairman of the Tianjin Federation of Literary and Art Circles. Luo visited Japan in 1987 and won the "Golden Record" Award from the China Record Company in 1989. She was awarded the "Lifetime Artistic Achievement Award" by the Art Center of New York. On November 9, 1996, Wang Guanli (王冠丽)took Luo Yusheng as her teacher.

In her decades of artistic practice, on the basis of "Liu School"(刘派), she combined the advantages of "white School"(白派)and "Shaobai School"(少白派), made full use of her sweet voice and wide vocal range, especially with a natural and pleasant tremolo, and created and formed the charming "Luo School" (骆派)Jingyun drum.

She was good at singing, especially in the fierce, straight and most moving "abrupt tone", known as the "golden voice singing king". Most of the young and middle-aged people, through the TV series "four generations in one Hall"(四世同堂)theme song "Rearranging the river and mountain to wait for the future" (重整河山待后生), heard of her and came to appreciate the Jingyun drum.

Luo died of respiratory failure in Tianjin on May 5, 2002, at the age of 89.

== Personal life ==
Luo had one son, Luo Jiaping(骆嘉平).

In 1954, Luo married Zhao Kuiying(赵魁英), the head of the Tianjin Folk Opera Troupe. When her husband died of a brain hemorrhage in 1980, she was 66 years old and was devastated. Many people advised her to remarry. She said lightly: "I have a Zhao Kuiying in my life, content!" When she was 78 years old, her son Luo Jiaping died of a heart attack at 57. The loss of her husband and son in old age was too painful for the elderly Luo Yusheng to bear.

== Representative works ==
- "Boya Wrestling the Piano"（伯牙摔琴）
- "Red Plum Court" (红梅阁）
- "Beating the drum to scold Cao"（击鼓骂曹）
- "Glorious Voyage"（光荣的航行）
- "Reliving the Hardships"（卧薪尝胆）
- "Reforming the River and Mountain to Wait for the Future"（重整河山待后生)

== Extended reading ==
- “The vicissitudes of life have thickened over time”（ 沧桑岁月稠）
