= Wu Yingyin =

Chinese singer (1922–2009)

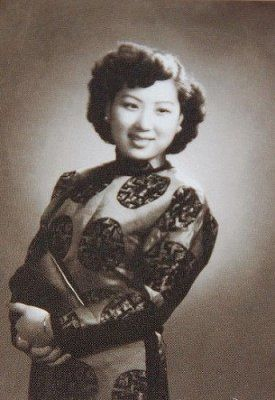
- Wu in 1940
- Born: 23 June 1922; Ningbo
- Died: 17 December 2009 (aged 87); Los Angeles, California
- Occupations: Actress, singer
- Years active: 1945–2008

Chinese name
- Traditional Chinese: 吳鶯音
- Simplified Chinese: 吴莺音
Transcriptions
Standard Mandarin
- Hanyu Pinyin: Wú Yīngyīn
Yue: Cantonese
- Jyutping: ng4 ang 1 jam1
- Musical career
- Also known as: 吳劍秋
- Origin: China
- Genres: Shidaiqu, Mandopop

Wu Yingyin (born Wu Jianqiu 吳劍秋; 23 June 1922 – 17 December 2009), also romanized as Woo Ing-ing, was a Chinese singer. She came to prominence in the 1940s and became known as one of the seven great singing stars of the era. She continued to record and perform for many decades until the 2000s.

== Early years ==
Wu was born in Ningbo to an intellectual family with her father a chemical engineer and mother a gynaecologist. She grew up in Shanghai and enjoyed singing to radio tunes at an early age. She originally wanted to go to the Shanghai Academy of Music, but her parents opposed the idea as they had wanted her to study medicine and criticized her for lacking ambition. When she was 15 or 16, to work around her parents' disapproval, she began performing under the stage name, Qian Yin (錢茵), on the weekends for a Shanghai radio station singing children's songs. She performed in secret and was unpaid for a few years.

== Career ==
Wu had a soft singing voice that made her a success. Buzz later went around about this new singer, although Wu's father did not realize that it was his own daughter's voice he heard on the radio. Vocally, Wu was largely self-taught, although later she learned some vocal techniques from a male singer, Xu Lang (徐朗).

At the age of 24, she participated in a singing competition at Ciro's (仙樂斯) nightclub, performing a song by Bai Hong, and won the crown. She then performed regularly at various dance halls and nightclubs, such as Ciro's and the Paramount in Shanghai, garnering acclaim for her performances. In 1946, she signed a contract with Pathé Records (China) record company. For the rest of her recording career, Wu was known under the stage name Yingyin, meaning "voice of an oriole". Her first record, "I Want to Forget You" (我想忘了你), written by Xu Lang, became a hit. Within her first three years of signing, Pathé Records produced and released over 30 songs for her.

In 1955 she joined Shanghai People's Broadcasting Station. She then relocated to Hong Kong in 1957 where she continued recording for Pathé Records. Among her best known songs are "Spring's Return to Earth" (大地回春), "Heartbreak" (斷腸紅), "I Had a Love" (我有一段情), "The Bright Moon Sends My Love Across a Thousand Miles" (明月千里寄相思), "Fine Spring Night" (好春宵), and "Chance Meeting of Strangers" (萍水相逢). She was affectionately nicknamed "Queen of the Nasal Voice" (鼻音歌后).

Wu enjoyed a resurgence in the 1980s and returned to China for recordings in 1983 in Guangzhou. In July 1984, she moved from Hong Kong to Pasadena, California. She performed extensively in Taiwan, Hong Kong, Singapore, Malaysia, the United States, and Canada well into her later years. At the age of 80, she was still singing at overseas Chinese neighborhood community events for charitable causes. On 3 January 2003 she was invited to perform at the Shanghai Grand Theatre.

The movie director, Wong Kar Wai, used her song, "Fine Spring Night" (好春宵), in his movie Eros - The Hand(2004).

Wu died in Los Angeles on 17 December 2009.
