= Yao Lee =

Chinese singer (1922–2019)

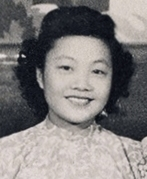
- Yao in the 1940s
- Born: Yáo Xiùyún (姚秀雲); September 10, 1922; Shanghai, Republic of China
- Died: July 19, 2019 (aged 96); Hong Kong, China
- Occupation: Singer
- Years active: 1930s–1970s
- Musical career
- Also known as: Silver Voice (銀嗓子)
- Genres: Mandopop, shidaiqu
- Label: Pathé / EMI

Chinese name
- Chinese: 姚莉
Transcriptions
Standard Mandarin
- Hanyu Pinyin: Yáo Lì
- Bopomofo: ㄧㄠˊ ㄌㄧˋ
Yue: Cantonese
- Jyutping: jiu4 lei6

Yao Lee (Chinese: 姚莉; 10 September 1922 – 19 July 2019), also credited as Yao Li, Yiu Lei and Hue Lee, was a Chinese singer active from the 1930s to the 1970s. She was the sister of Yao Min, also a famous singer and songwriter. She was considered one of the Seven Great Singing Stars of Shanghai in the 1940s.

== Biography ==
Born Yáo Xiùyún (Mandarin)/Yiu Sau Wan (Cantonese) (姚秀雲) and raised in Shanghai, Yao began performing on the radio in 1935 at the age of 13. When she was 14, she recorded her first single with Yàn Húa (嚴華) called "New Little Cowherd" (新小放牛, Xin xiao fang niu). After being introduced by singers Zhou Xuan and Yan Hua, she was signed to Pathé Records when she was 16 in 1937, and the first record she released with the label was "Yearning for Sale" (賣相思, Mai Xiang Si).

She married Wong Po Lo (黃保羅) in 1947 and stopped performing to devote time to her family. Following the Communist seizure of power in China in 1949, popular music was considered ideologically suspect and Yao fled to British Hong Kong in 1950 but continued her singing career with Pathé Records (EMI). In addition to releasing hit records, beginning in 1955 with the film 桃花江 (Peach Blossom River), she was also a playback singer for movie actresses. Many of her featured songs became popular hits. She stepped down from her singing career in 1967 after the death of her brother, Yao Min. In 1969, she accepted the invitation to become the General Manager and Producer at EMI Music Hong Kong. In 1970, she travelled to Taiwan in an effort to sign Teresa Teng to EMI for the Hong Kong market but was unsuccessful. Yao produced records for many artists during her time as a producer and retired from this position in 1977.

== Career ==
During the 1930s and 1940s, Yao Lee's high, soft singing style was typical of Chinese popular music of the time (influenced by her superstar idol, Zhou Xuan). She performed numerous popular standards, such as Wishing You Happiness and Prosperity (恭喜恭喜), "I Can't Have Your Love" (得不到你的愛情), and "By the Suzhou River" (蘇州河邊) with her brother Yao Min, arguably the best-known Chinese pop songwriter of the shidaiqu era. She is famous for her 1940 version of Rose, Rose, I Love You (玫瑰玫瑰我愛你), later recorded by Frankie Laine in the United States with English lyrics. Her version was also released in the U.S. and the United Kingdom credited to "Miss Hue Lee." Yao was known as "the Silver Voice" (銀嗓子), alluding to fellow Shanghai singer Zhou Xuan, who was known as "the Golden Voice" (金嗓子).

With increasing Western influences in the region after World War II and her move to Hong Kong, Yao Lee's singing style changed. She was introduced to more Western popular music and became an admirer of American singer Patti Page, whom she emulated by lowering her voice and incorporating some similar vocal mannerisms. As a result, Yao is sometimes called "Hong Kong's Patti Page." One of her biggest '50s records was "The Spring Breeze Kisses My Face" (春風吻上我的臉).

Yao was extremely prolific with over 400 gramophone records attributed to her. Her 1959 song, "Rén Shēng Jìu Shì Xì"/"Life Is a Performance" (人生就是戲), is featured in the 2018 film, Crazy Rich Asians, in the scene when the matriarch grandmother, played by veteran Chinese American actor Lisa Lu, first appears.

== Death ==
Yao died in Hong Kong on July 19, 2019.
