= Rose, Rose, I Love You =

"Rose, Rose, I Love You 玫瑰玫瑰我愛你"

Single by Yao Lee

from the album Singing Girl
- Released: 1940
- Recorded: 1940
- Genre: Mandopop, shidaiqu
- Length: 2:23
- Label: Pathé Records / EMI
- Songwriters: Chen Gexin, Wu Cun (吳村)

"Rose, Rose, I Love You" (Chinese: 玫瑰玫瑰我愛你; pinyin: Méiguì méiguì wǒ ài nǐ) is a 1940 Mandarin popular song composed by Chen Gexin and first recorded by Yao Lee. An English-language version whose lyrics have little in common with the original Mandarin was first recorded by Frankie Laine in 1951. The song was brought back to England by broadcaster Wilfrid Thomas in 1951 after doing commentary on the war in Malaya. When he played it on his BBC program he received a barrage of requests for a repeat and he played it again in several more programs. The song is also known under the titles "Shanghai Rose" and "China Rose."

== History ==
Yao Lee collection album titled after her hit song "Rose, Rose, I Love You" (玫瑰玫瑰我愛你)

The original Chinese lyrics were by Wu Cun (Ng Chuen; 吳村 Wú Cūn) and the music was credited to Lin Mei (林枚), a pen name of the popular songwriter Chen Gexin. The song was first recorded in 1940 by Yao Lee as an interlude for the film Singing Girl and released as a single on Pathé Records (EMI) catalog number B. 597. Yao Lee's Mandarin version was also released in the US and UK in the early 1950s by Columbia Records, catalog numbers 39420 and 2837 respectively. Yao Lee was credited as Miss Hue Lee on this release. Other early releases have also credited her as Yiu Lei.

The English-language lyrics were written by the British radio presenter Wilfrid Thomas. It was recorded by American singer Frankie Laine and the Norman Luboff Choir, with Paul Weston and his orchestra, on 6 April 1951, and released by Columbia Records as catalog number 39367. The song reached number 3 on the Billboard music chart. At this time Columbia also released Yao Lee's original Mandarin version in the US and UK under the English title, "Rose, Rose, I Love You". When the songwriter Chen Gexin's youngest son went to the United States for advanced education, he was able to meet Laine and maintained a correspondence. The English lyrics have little in common with the original Mandarin, but they pay subtle tribute to the titular Mandarin phrase "méigui méigui" (lit. rose, rose) by including the similar-sounding English phrase "make way" with its normal English meaning three times.

== Covers ==
- Petula Clark covered the song in English with new lyrics under the title "May Kway". This lyric entered the UK sheet music charts on May 5, 1951 and peaked at number 16.
- Japanese singer Kyu Sakamoto covered the original Mandarin versions in the 1960s.
- Gordon Jenkins released a cover of Frankie Laine's version on Decca Records catalog number 27594.
- Aneka also covered Frankie Laine's version in 1984, also adding new original English lyrics. This single was released by Ariola Records but did not chart.
- Hong Kong singer Anita Mui sang the Cantonese cover of the song in 1989, and was featured as the theme soundtrack in Jackie Chan's film, Miracles.
- Malaysian girl group Four Golden Princess released an album of medleys (2006), each of which paired a popular Mandarin song with an English-language pop song. They covered the first two verses and chorus of the English-language version of "Rose, Rose, I Love You", rather than the Chinese version.
- The original Mandarin version of this song was also covered by Taiwanese singer Joanna Wang on her 2009 album Joanna & Wang Ruo-lin.
- The Mandarin version has also reached a degree of popularity in Vietnam with various performers, such as Thu Ngọc and Thái Doanh Doanh, covering the song under the title "Cánh hồng Trung Quốc".

== In popular culture ==
- The original Mandarin song was featured in the 1996 film The Pillow Book, both opening and closing the film and serving as a leitmotif representing the protagonist Nagiko's childhood. It was also featured in the 2005 film The White Countess (the film appears to be set in 1937, so the inclusion of the song would be anachronistic). Anita Mui sings this song in the 1989 Jackie Chan film Miracles.
- The Frankie Laine version was featured in Peter Bogdanovich's 1971 film The Last Picture Show.
- David Bowie references the song in the 1984 documentary Ricochet. While visiting Hong Kong during his Serious Moonlight Tour, Bowie is filmed having dinner with a group of local socialites. He asks if they know the song, and several of the guests begin to sing it. At another time, the song is heard as a backdrop to footage of Hong Kong street life.
