= Campus folk song =

Taiwanese music genre

Taiwanese campus folk song
- Stylistic origins: Chinese folk music; folk rock; Enka; Doo-wop
- Cultural origins: 1970s, Taiwan
- Typical instruments: Traditional Chinese instruments; vocals; guitar; acoustic guitar; piano

Other topics
- C-Pop; mandopop; hokkien pop

Taiwan campus folk song, campus folk song, or campus folk rock (Chinese: 校園民歌) is a genre of Taiwanese music with its roots as student songs in the campuses of Taiwanese universities during the 1970s. The genre was highly popular from the mid-1970s to the early 1990s, with its focus on themes from the Chinese cultural sphere in reaction to the prevalence of Western rock music in Taiwan as well as being edged out by the People's Republic of China from the United Nations and from the world political stage. This genre of music became very popular in mainland China during the 1990s with the increased cultural exchanges between Taiwan and the mainland during this period.

Campus folk rock was created by university age youth wishing to assert their own distinct cultural identities and "Sing our own songs."(Chinese: 唱自己的歌) in Chinese, taking the aspirations from the American folk music revival. The movement towards and popularization of this music is considered to be a societal reaction towards Taiwan's expulsion from United Nations (UN) in 1971 in the United Nations General Assembly Resolution 2758, with international admission of the People's Republic of China as the sole legitimate representative of China in the UN. The songs were composed through fusing instrumental and melodic elements from American folk rock, along with the expression and themes from Chinese folk music, both of which were familiar to the youth of the time. Songs from the genre are characterized as having a forward-looking, optimistic, simple, and youthful feel, with acoustic guitar and piano as some of its most commonly used accompanying instruments.

== See also ==
- Xinyao, Singaporean version of campus folk song
