= Gong Qiuxia =

Chinese actress and singer

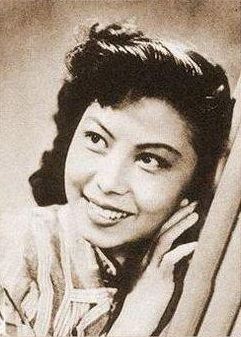
- Born: 4 December 1916; Chongming, Jiangsu (now Shanghai), China
- Died: 7 September 2004 (aged 87); Hong Kong
- Occupations: Actress, singer

Chinese name
- Traditional Chinese: 龔秋霞
- Simplified Chinese: 龚秋霞
Transcriptions
Standard Mandarin
- Hanyu Pinyin: gong1 qiu1 xia2
Yue: Cantonese
- Jyutping: gung1 cau1 haa4
- Musical career
- Genres: Shidaiqu, Mandopop

Gong Qiuxia, also romanized as Kung Chiu-hsia and Gong Chio Xia (4 December 1918 – 7 September 2004) was a Chinese actress and singer. By the 1940s, she became one of the seven great singing stars.

== Biography ==
In 1933, she traveled across Southeast Asia as a member of the Shanghai Plum Flower Troupe (梅花歌舞团). One of the theatrical plays she took part in was the Five Tiger Generals (五虎將). As a result of her training, she was an accomplished tap dancer. Her early films would capitalize on this talent as one of the few Chinese female stars who was a triple-threat (acting, singing, dancing). People would affectionately refer to her as an older Shirley Temple.

In 1946, she moved to Hong Kong with her husband. They later moved to Taipei, Taiwan, in 1967.

She died on 7 September 2004 in Hong Kong exactly ten years before fellow Seven great singing star Li Xianglan.

== Career ==
In 1936, she made her first film (父母子女, Father Mother Son Daughter). In 1937, she starred in the movie 壓歲錢 and began taking a relatively serious attitude toward filmmaking. She is most recognized for playing the mature, housewife image.

From 1938 to 1980, she took part in a number of movies. The movie 四千金 (Four Daughters) would earn her the nickname "Big Sister."

In the 1930s, she was recognized as one of the three great mandopop singers with Zhou Xuan and Bai Hong.

== Filmography ==
- (父母子女) (1936)
- (永遠的微笑)，(壓歲錢)，(古塔奇案)，(四千金) (1937)
- (孤兒救母記)，(恐怖之夜) (1938)
- (歌聲淚痕)，(播音台大血案) (1939)
- (鸞鳳和鳴)，(大地之花)，(花濺淚) (1941)
- (薔薇處處開)，(黑夜魔影)，(恨不相逢未嫁時)，(博愛四姊妹)，(浮雲掩月) (1942)
- (千金怨)，(難兄難弟)，(激流)，(夜長夢多)，(來日方長)，(京華舊夢)，(凱風) (1943)
- (萬戶更新)，(大地之花) (1945)
- (蘆花翻白燕子飛) (1946)
- (四美圖)，(春花秋月) (1947)
- (花街蕩婦)，(心血)，(染紅海棠)，(一代妖姬路) (1949)
- (南來雁)，(新紅樓夢)，(狂風之夜)，(禁婚記) (1950)
- (中秋月娘)，(惹門)，(不知道的父親) (1951)
- (白日夢)，(兒女經深閨)，(夢里人)，(寸草心) (1952)
- (水紅菱)，(都會交響曲)，(姊妹曲)，(大兒女經) (1953)
- (少女的煩惱)，(我是一個女人)，(女子公寓)，(闔第光臨)，(孔雀開屏)，(一年之計) (1955)
- (紅顏劫)，(男大當婚) (1956)
- (春歸何處)，(香噴噴的小姐)，(王老五之戀)，(眼兒媚)，(未出嫁的媽媽)，(情竇初開) (1957)
- (錦上添花)，(有女懷春)，(笑笑笑少年遊)，(春到海濱)，(金屋夢)，(荳蔻年華) (1958)
- (十七歲)，(同命鴛鴦)，(脂粉小霸王) (1959)
- (雷雨)，(鴛夢重溫)，(雪地情仇) (1960)
- (美人計)，(糊塗姻緣)，(含苞待放) (1961)
- (滄海遺珠)，(三笑) (1962)
- (龍鳳呈祥)，(椰林雙妹)，(合家歡) (1963)
- (小忽雷)，(雙槍黃英姑) (1965)
- (社會棟樑)，(迎春花) (1966)
- (鐵腳馬眼神仙肚) (1978)
- (胭脂) (1980)
