= Bai Hong =

Chinese actress and singer (1920–1992)

- Bai in the 1940s
- Born: Bai Lizhu (白麗珠); 24 February 1920; Beijing, China
- Died: 28 May 1992 (aged 72)
- Occupations: Actress, singer

Chinese name
- Chinese: 白虹
Transcriptions
Standard Mandarin
- Hanyu Pinyin: bai2 hong2
Yue: Cantonese
- Jyutping: baak6 hung4
- Musical career
- Genres: Shidaiqu, Mandopop
- Instrument: Singing

Bai Hong (白虹, 24 February 1920 – 28 May 1992) was a Chinese actress and singer born Bai Lizhu (白麗珠) in Beijing. By the 1940s, she had become one of the Seven Great Singing Stars.

== Biography ==
At age 11, Bai was admitted to the Bright Moonlight Song and Dance Troupe and entered Shanghai's entertainment industry. She used the stage name (白虹), meaning "White Rainbow". She was called one of the "Beiping Three Whites" (北平三白) with Bai Guang and Bai Yang.

== Career ==
Her music career began at the young age of 11. She acted in her first film, Renjian Xianzi《人間仙子》, at 14. In the 1930s, she was a popstar icon singing songs like 長生果. By 1934, a singing competition was sponsored in Shanghai, where she won by more than 200 votes taking the crown. She was known for having a mastery of the language and a clarity in expressing lyrics, which helped her gain many fans. In 1936 she toured Southeast Asia with the Bright Moonlight Song and Dance Troupe. A year later, she then joined the Green Bird Theatre Troupe (青鳥劇團).

In the 1930s, she was recognized as one of the three great mandopop singers with Zhou Xuan and Gong Qiuxia.

Her career peaked in the 1940s, when her music style changed more to uptempo jazz. Some of the songs that propelled her to stardom included "Intoxicating Lipstick" (醉人的口紅), "Love and Gold" (愛情與黃金), "Flowers Don't Bloom Without Rain" (雨不灑花花不紅) and "He's Like the Spring Wind" (郎是春日風).

In the 1930s and 1940s, she recorded more than 150 songs and had many hits. Only Zhou Xuan made more recordings than her during that time. She performed in over 30 films and had many stage performances. She was also the first pop singer from Mainland China to give a solo concert, which took place on 12 and 13 January 1945. The three songs 乘風破浪, 可憐的爸爸媽媽, and 醉人的口紅 were her personal preferences.

She was married to the composer Li Jinguang (黎錦光), and they later divorced in 1950. She stayed in China after 1949 and continued performing in theater. During the Cultural Revolution, because Jiang Qing and the Gang of Four did not want people to know anything about Bai's song and film history in Shanghai the 1930s and 1940s, many other people of the same generation as Bai were imprisoned. Bai, a singer and actress in the 1930s and 1940s, was also imprisoned and subjected to persecution and abuse. She officially retired in 1979.

In 1992, she died at the age of 72.

== Discography ==
- 《晚香玉》（1932 Pathe/EMI）
- 《慈母摇篮歌/小宝贝》（1933 Victor）
- 《民族之光》（1933 Victor）
- 《我的妹妹》（1933 Victor）
- 《绿裙队》（1933 Victor）
- 《穷快活》（1933 Victor）
- 《双料情人（头段、二段）》（1933 Victor）
- 《红烧丈夫》（1933 Victor）
- 《夜半的私语/开始的一吻》（1933 Odeon）
- 《回忆》（1933 Odeon）
- 《卖花女》（1933 Odeon）
- 《喜相逢》（1933 Odeon）
- 《山中美人/逍遥调》（1933 Odeon）
- 《摇摇宝贝/你要那一个抱》（1933 Odeon）
- 《从军别爱（头段、二段）》（1933 Odeon）
- 《去年的我/青春之乐》（1933 Odeon）
- 《祝您晚安》（1934 Pathe/EMI）
- 《国难来了/勇健的青年》（1934 Pathe/EMI）
- 《纸窗夜雨（头段、二段）》（1937 Regal/EMI）
- 《知音之爱（头段、二段）》（1937 Regal/EMI）
- 《你的一笑/不上钓的鱼》（1935 Pathe/EMI）
- 《十六岁姑娘/花心曲》（1934 Pathe/EMI）
- 《跳舞救国（头段、二段）》（1934 Pathe/EMI）
- 《长期抵抗/请君进网》（1935 Pathe/EMI）
- 《银色的凄凉（头段、二段）》（1934 Pathe/EMI）
- 《人间仙子（头段、二段）》（1934 Pathe/EMI）
- 《长生果/送郎》（1935 Pathe/EMI）
- 《卖孩子/卖报》（1935 Pathe/EMI）
- 《我们的家乡/可爱的梦乡》（1935 Pathe/EMI）
- 《麻雀与小孩（头段、二段）》（1936 Pathe/EMI）
- 《麻雀与小孩（三段、四段）》（1936 Pathe/EMI）
- 《对歌/歼霸歌》（1936 Pathe/EMI）
- 《我陶醉了/酒话》（1937 Regal/EMI）
- 《狂欢曲/爱我青春》（1937 Regal/EMI）
- 《囚犯歌/牢吟曲》（1937 Regal/EMI）
- 《你的爱人就是他/青年的时髦》（1937 Regal/EMI）
- 《要嫁妆/小寡妇诉苦》（1938 Regal/EMI）
- 《南洋佳偶/郎和姐儿》（1938 Regal/EMI）
- 《你到底怎么样》（1939 Victor）
- 《爱境情途》（1939 Victor）
- 《卖花翁》（1939 Victor）
- 《水月之爱》（1940 Victor）
- 《满庭芳》（1940 Victor）
- 《闹五更》（1940 Victor）
- 《旋舞之歌》（1940 Victor）
- 《太平春/盛筵开》（1940 Regal/EMI）
- 《春怨/恋歌》（1940 Pathe/EMI）
- 《忘了我吧/哥哥你爱我》（1940 Pathe/EMI）
- 《爱如金玉/要想作新郎》（1940 Pathe/EMI）
- 《点秋香》（1940 Pathe/EMI）
- 《人海飘航/春天的降临》（1941 Pathe/EMI）
- 《相思谣/风雨》（1941 Pathe/EMI）
- 《春之舞曲/郎是春日风》（1941 Pathe/EMI）
- 《埋玉/莎莎再会吧》（1941 Pathe/EMI）
- 《樵歌/河上的月色》（1942 Pathe/EMI）
- 《我的怀念/少年行》（1942 Pathe/EMI）
- 《镜花水月/洪水》（1942 Victor）
- 《打渔的姑娘/天南地北》（1943 Pathe/EMI）
- 《柳青青/花儿你可爱》(1943 Pathe/EMI)
- 《我自从遇见你》（1943 Pathe/EMI）
- 《不要回头看/夜半三更》（1944 Victor）
- 《牧羊/三年》（1943 Pathe/EMI）
- 《苏州夜曲/白头吟》（1943 Victor）
- 《兴亚之歌》（1943 Victor）
- 《青春之歌》（1944 Pathe/EMI）
- 《春的爱》（1943 Victor）
- 《总在这儿等/恋歌》（1944 Victor）
- 《我要你》（1944 Victor）
- 《何日君再来》（1944 Radio）
- 《逢人笑时背人泪》（unreleased）
- 《寻梦曲/你是天风》（1945 Pathe/EMI）
- 《祝福》(unreleased/2008)
- 《落花流水》（unreleased）
- 《黄昏》（unreleased）
- 《疯狂乐队/海恋》（1947 Pathe/EMI）
- 《花月佳期/且听我说》（1947 Pathe/EMI）
- 《花之恋/蔷薇花》（1947 Pathe/EMI）
- 《夜半行/咪咪》（1947 Pathe/EMI）
- 《大拜年》（1947 Pathe/EMI）
- 《我要回家/爱情与黄金》（1947 Pathe/EMI）
- 《香岛风月/塞外情歌》（1948 Pathe/EMI）
- 《归来吧/船家女》（1947 Pathe/EMI）
- 《我的心在跳/我的家》（1948 Pathe/EMI）
- 《爱河浴/相思草》（1949 Pathe/EMI）
- 《月下悲思/乘风破浪》（1948 Pathe/EMI）
- 《浪花/别走得那么快》（1948 Pathe/EMI）
- 《恼人的夜雨/雨不洒花花不红》（1949 Pathe/EMI）
- 《可怜的爸爸妈妈/太湖船》（1948 Pathe/EMI）
- 《失去的周末/同心谣》（1949 Pathe/EMI）
- 《江头残月/不了情》（1950 Pathe/EMI）
- 《有你在身旁/夕阳无限好》（1950 Pathe/EMI）
- 《醉人的口红/纺棉花》（1948 Pathe/EMI）
- 《暴雨打芙蓉》（unreleased）
- 《朗朗月/被刺的手》（1951 Pathe/EMI）

== Filmography ==
- 《野玫瑰》（1932）
- 《华山艳史》（1934）
- 《人间仙子》（1934）
- 《健美运动》 (1934)
- 《美人恩（上、下部）》（1935）
- 《国色天香》（1936）
- 《日出》（1938）
- 《情天血泪》（1938）
- 《离恨天》（1938）
- 《珍珠衫》（1938）
- 《少奶奶的扇子》（1939）
- 《武则天》（1939）
- 《云裳仙子》（1939）
- 《金银世界》（1939）
- 《三剑客》（1939）
- 《王熙凤大闹宁国府》（1939）
- 《播音台大血案》（1939）
- 《亡命之徒》（1940）
- 《双珠凤（上、下部）》（1940）
- 《潇湘秋雨》（1940）
- 《刁刘氏》（1940）
- 《红线盗盒》（1940）
- 《九大明星歌唱大会》（1940）
- 《铁扇公主》（1941）
- 《孤岛春秋》（1941）
- 《无花果》（1941）
- 《玉碎珠圆》（1942）
- 《地老天荒》（1942）
- 《美人关》（1943）
- 《何日君再来》（1943）
- 《结婚交响曲》（1944）
- 《红楼梦》（1944）
- 《银海千秋》（1944）
- 《万户更新》（1945）
- 《红楼残梦》（1948）
- 《雾夜血案》（1948）
- 《夜莺曲》（1950）
