= Three Girls Revitalizing Asia =

1940–1941 East Asian girl group

Three Girls Revitalizing Asia 興亜三人娘
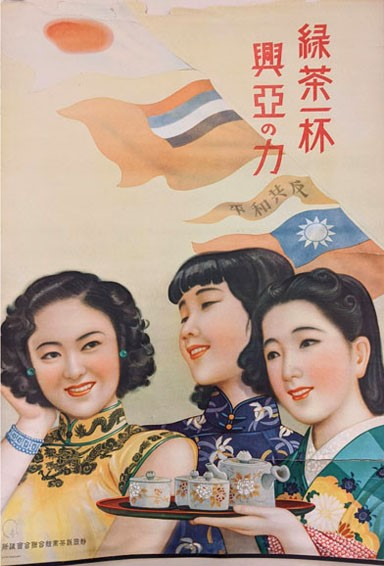
- 1940 Japanese propaganda poster depicting the Three Girls. Left to right: Yoshiko Yamaguchi (Ri Kōran), Bai Guang and Saiko Okuyama.

Background information
- Origin: Japan
- Genres: Musical nationalism; Ryūkōka
- Years active: 1940–1941
- Label: Nippon Columbia
- Past members: Yoshiko Yamaguchi (Ri Kōran); Bai Guang; Saiko Okuyama

The Three Girls Revitalizing Asia (Japanese: 興亜三人娘, romanized: Koa sannin musume), known simply as the Three Girls, was a transnational girl group briefly active in the 1940s. This trio of Bai Guang (representing China), Yoshiko Yamaguchi (Ri Kōran, representing Manchukuo) and Saiko Okuyama (representing Japan) were part of Japan's cultural propaganda efforts during the Second World War, aimed at promoting the Greater East Asia Co-Prosperity Sphere—a concept that sought to create a bloc of Asian nations ruled by Japan, ostensibly free from Western imperialism due to being controlled by the Japanese colonial empire.

== Career ==
The Three Girls released their first single, "The Three Girls Revitalizing Asia" (興亜三人娘, "Koa sannin musume"), in December 1940 under the Nippon Columbia label. A Japan–Manchuria–China friendship song performed by all three girls in the major key, the track's lyrics describe each land as its national flower (chrysanthemum for Japan, orchid for Manchuria, and plum blossom for China), as well as how the three girls interpret love and work together towards "revitalizing" Asia. The B-side was "Flowers Blooming in My Heart" (心に咲く花, "Kokoro ni saku hana"), a ryūkōka sung by Yoshiko Yamaguchi about the three girls themselves. On the album cover, each girl is depicted wearing her respective national costume while holding flowers and smiling. Slightly below them on the cover is a male Imperial Japanese pilot.

The Three Girls disbanded in 1941, shortly after releasing a re-recorded version of their single. Yamaguchi, selected in part for her ethnically ambiguous appearance, went on to have a successful career as an actress, journalist, and politician. Despite their short run, the Three Girls are credited with inventing a marketing strategy where each member takes up a unique "official position" in their group, still used by many Japanese idol groups in the modern day.
