= Yoshiko Yamaguchi =

Japanese singer, actress, and politician (1920–2014)

- 山口 淑子
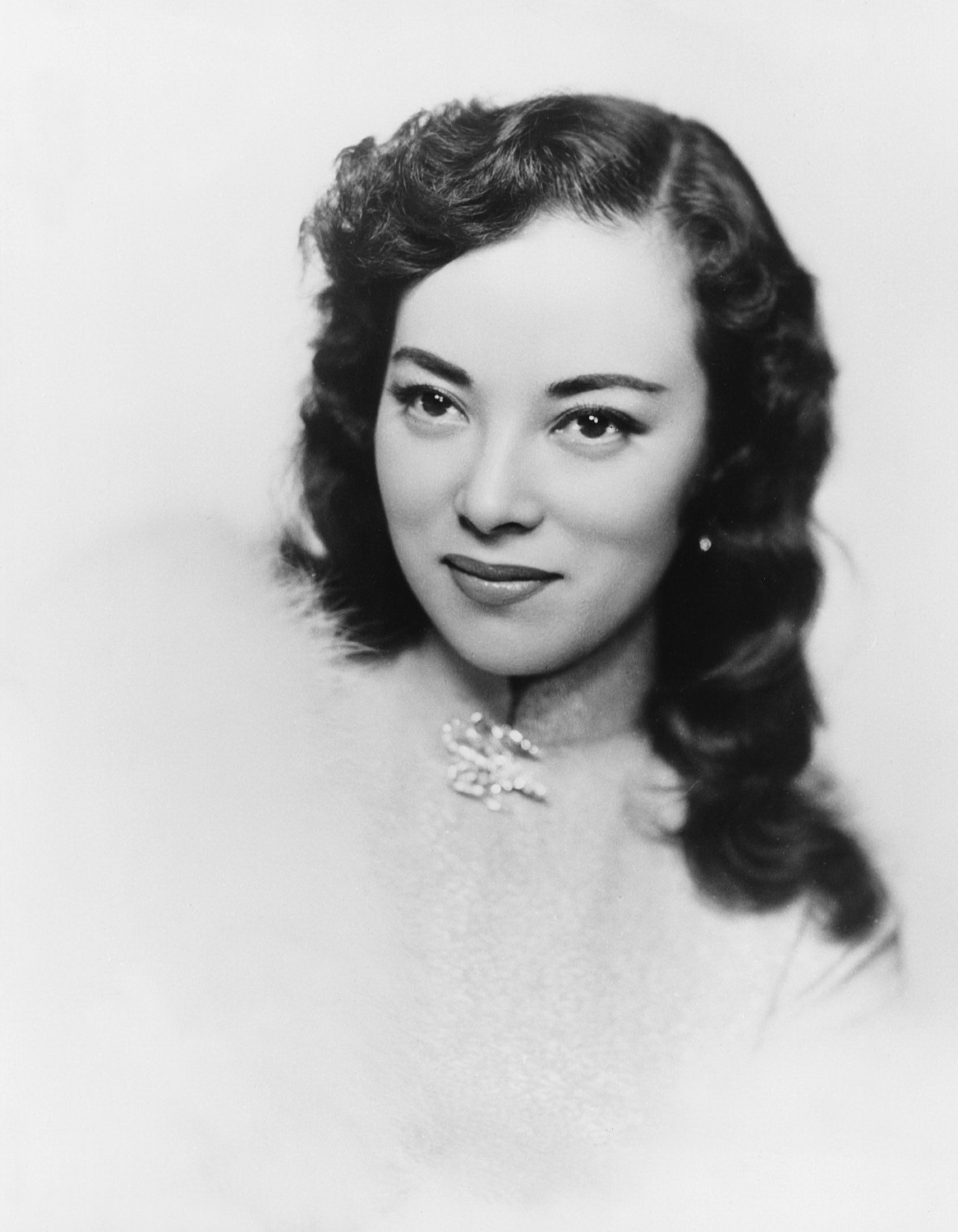
- Yamaguchi in the 1940s

Member of the House of Councillors
- In office 8 July 1974 – 7 July 1992
- Constituency: National district (1974–1983); National PR (1983–1992)

Personal details
- Born: Yoshiko Yamaguchi; 12 February 1920 Liaoyang, Manchuria, Republic of China
- Died: 7 September 2014 (aged 94) Chiyoda, Tokyo, Japan
- Party: Liberal Democratic
- Spouses: Isamu Noguchi (m. 1951; div. 1956) Hiroshi Ōtaka (m. 1958; died 2001)
- Occupation: Singer, actress, journalist, politician
- Awards: Order of the Sacred Treasure, Second Class
- Musical career
- Also known as: Yoshiko Ōtaka (大鷹 淑子); Pan Shuhua (潘淑華); Shirley Yamaguchi; Li Hsiang-lan (李香蘭)
- Genre: Popular music
- Years active: 1938–1958

Chinese name
- Traditional Chinese: 李香蘭
- Simplified Chinese: 李香兰
Transcriptions
Standard Mandarin
- Hanyu Pinyin: Lǐ Xiānglán
- Wade–Giles: Li^{3} Hsiang^{1}-lan^{2}
Yue: Cantonese
- Jyutping: Lei5 Hoeng1 Laan4

Yoshiko Yamaguchi (Japanese: 山口淑子 Yamaguchi Yoshiko; Chinese: 山口淑子 Shānkǒu Shūzǐ; 12 February 1920 – 7 September 2014) was a Japanese singer, actress, journalist, and politician. Born in China, she had an international career in film in China, Hong Kong, Japan, and the United States.

Early in her career the Manchukuo Film Association concealed her Japanese origin, and she went by the Chinese name Li Hsiang-lan (李香蘭), rendered in Japanese as Ri Kōran. This allowed her to convincingly portray Chinese characters in Japanese propaganda movies. After the war she appeared in Japanese films under her birth name and in several American films under the stage name Shirley Yamaguchi.

Upon marrying her second husband she quit acting and worked as a journalist in the late 1950s under the name Yoshiko Ōtaka (大鷹 淑子, Ōtaka Yoshiko). She was elected as a member of the Japanese parliament in 1974 and served for 18 years. After retiring from politics she served as vice president of the Asian Women's Fund.

== Early life ==
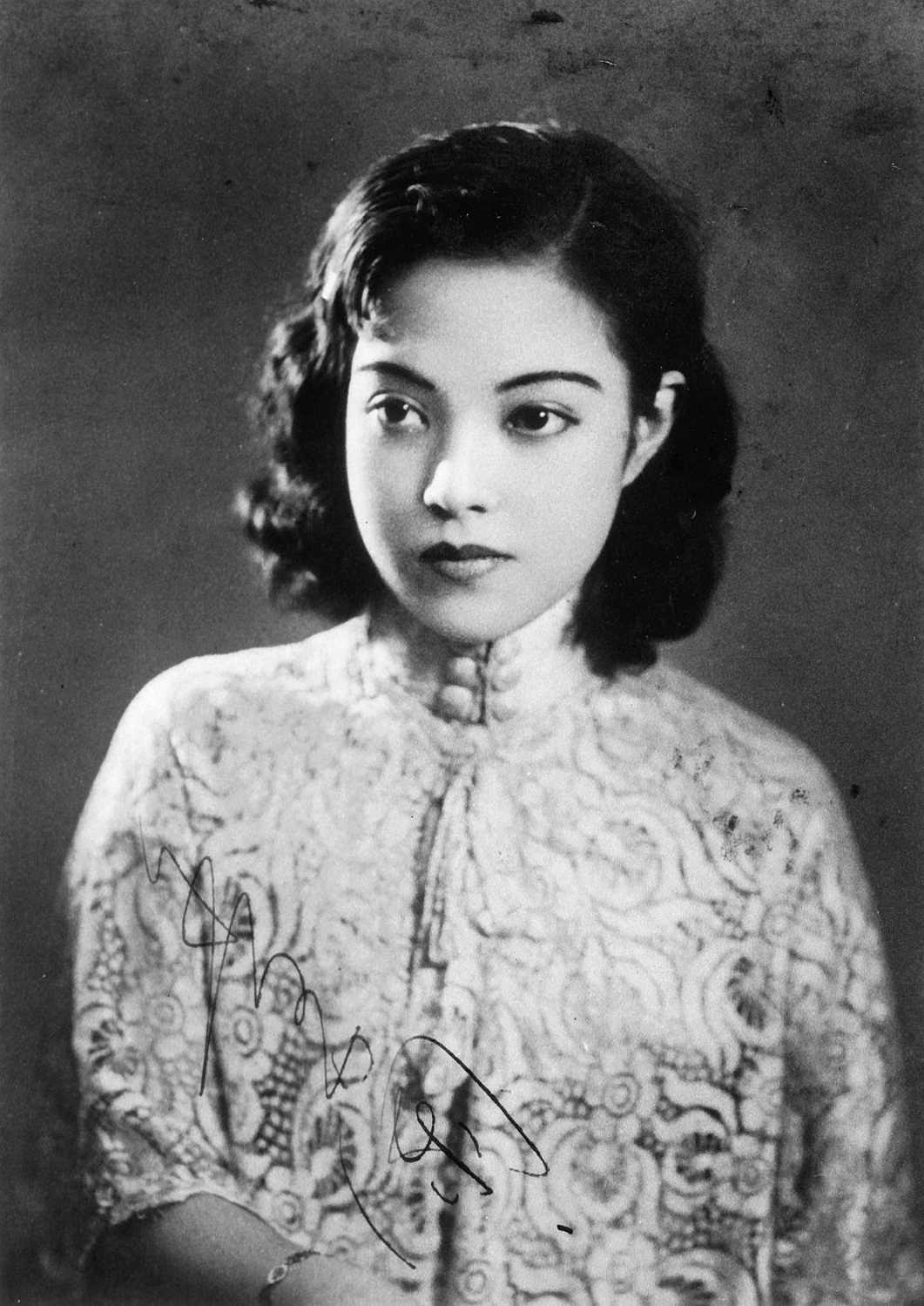
Yoshiko Yamaguchi in 1933

She was born on February 12, 1920, to Japanese parents, Ai Yamaguchi (山口 アイ, Yamaguchi Ai) and Fumio Yamaguchi (山口 文雄, Yamaguchi Fumio), who were then settlers in Fushun, Manchuria, Republic of China, in a coal mining residential area in Dengta, Liaoyang.

Fumio Yamaguchi was an employee of the South Manchuria Railway. From an early age Yoshiko was exposed to Mandarin Chinese. Fumio Yamaguchi had some influential Chinese acquaintances, among whom were Li Jichun (李際春) and Pan Yugui (潘毓桂). By Chinese custom for those who became sworn brothers, they also became Yoshiko's "godfathers" (also known as "nominal fathers") and gave her two Chinese names, Li Hsiang-lan (or Li Xianglan in Pinyin) and Pan Shuhua (潘淑華). (Shu in Shuhua and Yoshi in Yoshiko are written with the same Chinese character). Yoshiko later used the former as a stage name and assumed the latter name while she was staying with the Pan family in Beijing.

As a youth Yoshiko suffered a bout of tuberculosis. In order to strengthen her breathing, the doctor recommended voice lessons. Her father insisted on traditional Japanese music, but Yoshiko preferred Western styles and thus received her initial classical vocal education from Madame Podresov, an Italian dramatic soprano who had married into White Russian nobility. She later studied in Beijing to polish her Mandarin, accommodated by the Pan family. Yamaguchi was a coloratura soprano.

== Career in China ==
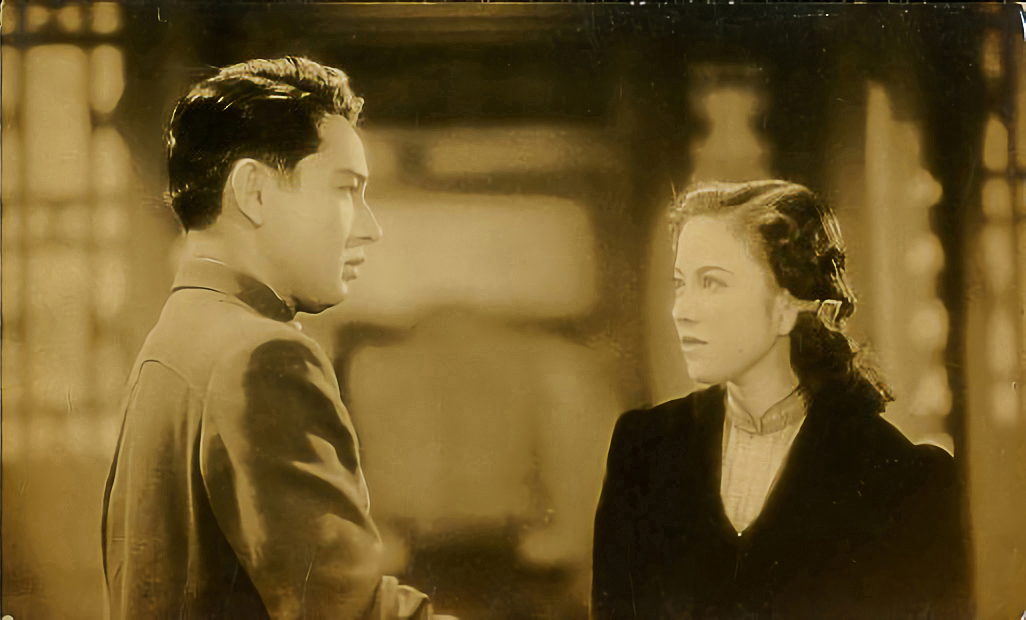
Li Hsiang-lan & Kazuo Hasegawa

Yoshiko made her debut as an actress and singer in Manchuria Film Production's 1938 film Honeymoon Express (蜜月快車), in which she was billed as Li Hsiang-lan. The adoption of a Chinese stage name was prompted by the film company's economic and political motives of featuring and promoting a bilingual Manchurian girl. From this she rose to stardom and became the Japan-Manchuria Goodwill Ambassadress (日滿親善大使). The head of the Manchukuo film industry, General Masahiko Amakasu, decided she was the star he had been looking for: a beautiful actress fluent in both Mandarin and Japanese, who could pass as Chinese and who had an excellent singing voice.

The Chinese actors who appeared in the Manchuria Film Production titles were never informed that she was Japanese, but they suspected she was at least half-Japanese, noting that she always ate her meals with the Japanese actors instead of the Chinese ones, was given white rice to eat instead of the sorghum given to the Chinese, and was paid ten times more than the Chinese castmates. Though in her subsequent films she was almost exclusively billed as Li Hsiang-lan, she appeared in a few as Yamaguchi Yoshiko.

Many of her films bore some degree of propaganda for the Japanese national policy (in particular, pertaining to the Greater East Asia Co-prosperity Sphere ideology) and can be termed "National Policy Films" (国策映画). While promoting Manchurian interests in Tokyo, Li would meet Kenichiro Matsuoka, the son of Japanese diplomat Yōsuke Matsuoka and future television executive, whom she would identify in her autobiography, Ri Kōran: My Half Life, as her first love. Although she had hopes of marriage, he was still a student at Tokyo Imperial University and not interested in settling down at the time. They would meet again after the war, at which time Kenichiro attempted to rekindle the relationship, but by then Li was already involved with the artist Isamu Noguchi.

The 1940 film China Nights (中國の夜), also known as Shanghai Nights (上海の夜), from Manchuria Film Productions is especially controversial. It is unclear whether it was a "National Policy Film", since it portrays Japanese soldiers in both a positive and negative light. In it Li plays a young woman of extreme anti-Japanese sentiment who falls in love with a Japanese man. The story's key turning point has the Japanese man slap the young Chinese woman, but instead of hatred she reacts with gratitude for being made to recognize her prejudice against Japan. The film was met with great criticism from Chinese audiences, as they interpreted her Chinese character to be a symbol of debasement and inferiority that needed to be corrected. 23,000 Chinese people paid to see the film in 1943. After the war the Chinese government banned one of her classic songs, "Suzhou Serenade" (蘇州夜曲), due to its association with this film. A few years later when confronted by angry Chinese reporters in Shanghai, Li apologized and cited as pretext her inexperienced youth at the time of filmmaking for choosing not to reveal her Japanese identity.

Though her Japanese nationality was never divulged in the Chinese media until after the end of World War II, it was brought to light by the Japanese press, who criticized her for being too Chinese in dress and in language. In 1941 she visited Japan under her Chinese name for a publicity tour as the Japan-Manchuria Goodwill Ambassadress. When she arrived dressed in a qipao and speaking Japanese with a Mandarin accent, the customs officer saw that she had a Japanese passport and a Japanese name and remarked, "Don't you know that we Japanese are the superior people? Aren't you ashamed to be wearing third-rate chankoro clothes and speaking their language as you do?"

In 1943 Li appeared in Eternity, which was shot in Shanghai, commemorating the centennial of the Opium War. The film, anti-British in nature and a collaboration between Chinese and Japanese film companies, was a hit, and Li became a national sensation. Her songs from the movie with jazz and pop-like arrangements, such as "Candy-Peddling Song" (賣糖歌) and "Quitting (Opium) Song" (戒菸歌), elevated her status to being among the top singers in all Chinese-speaking regions in Asia overnight. Many songs recorded by Li during her Shanghai period became classics in Chinese popular music history, including "Evening Primrose / Fragrance of the Night" (夜來香), "Ocean Bird" (海燕), "If Only" (恨不相逢未嫁時), and "Second Dream" (第二夢). By the mid-1940s she had become one of the Seven Great Singing Stars.

As Li Hsiang-lan in Japan
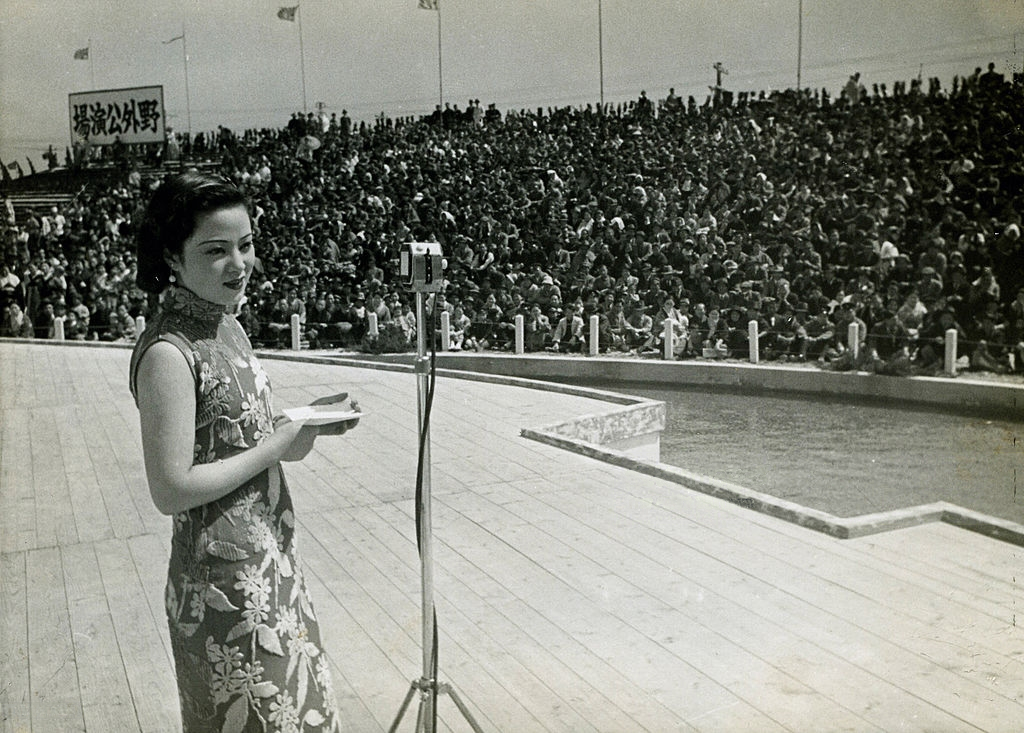
Visit to Japan. Concert in Nishinomiya (1939)

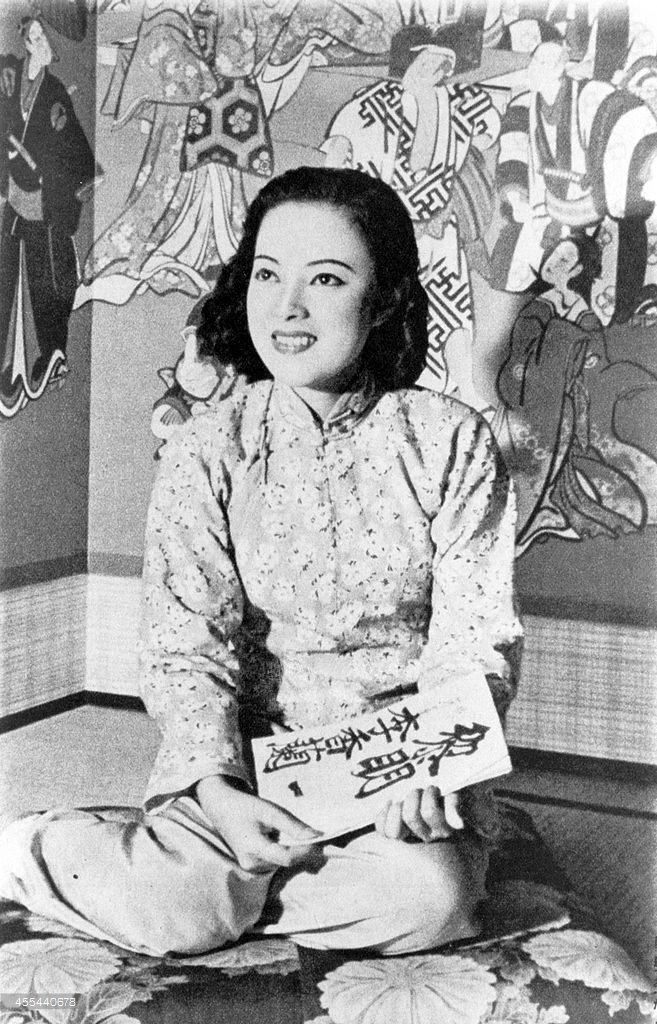
Visit to Japan. In the dressing room (1940)

== United States, Canada, Hong Kong, and Japan ==
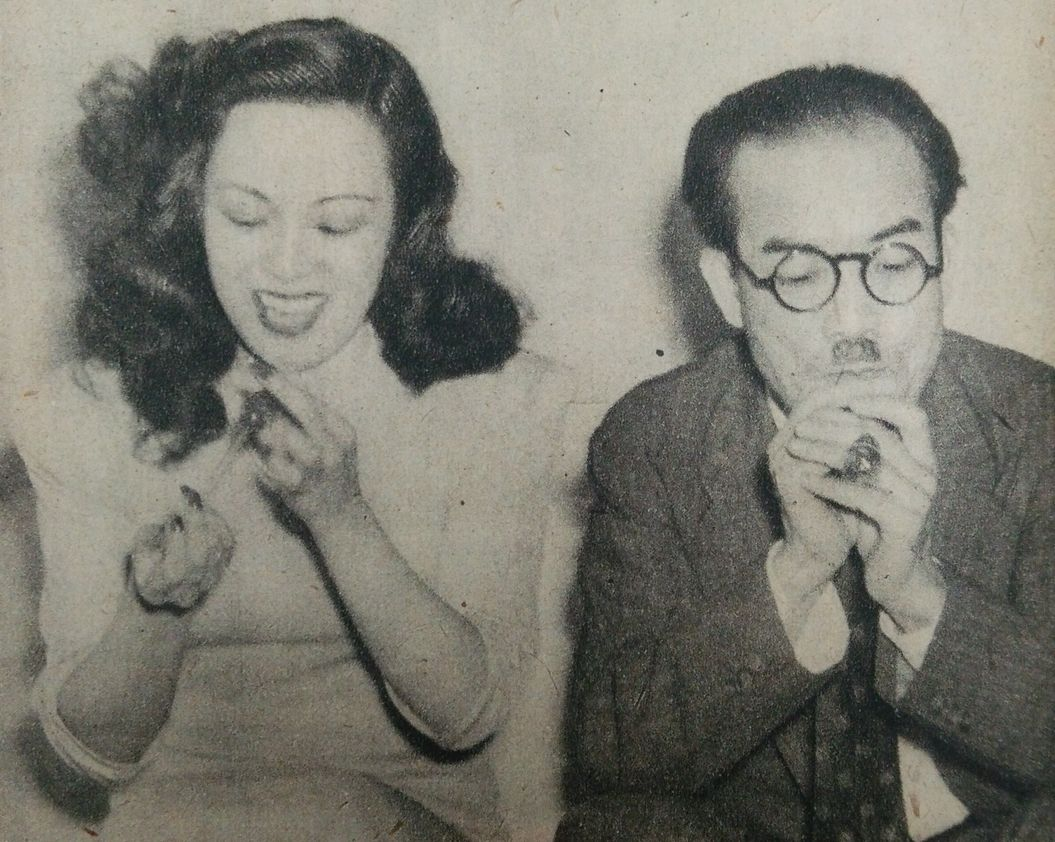
Yoshiko Yamaguchi with comedian Entatsu Yokoyama in 1948

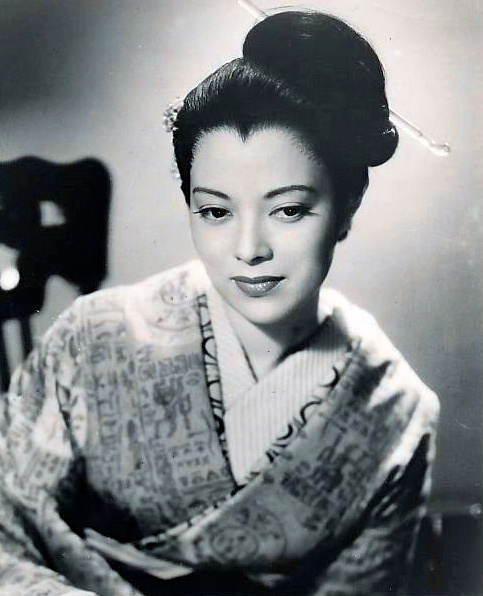
Yoshiko Yamaguchi in the 1950s

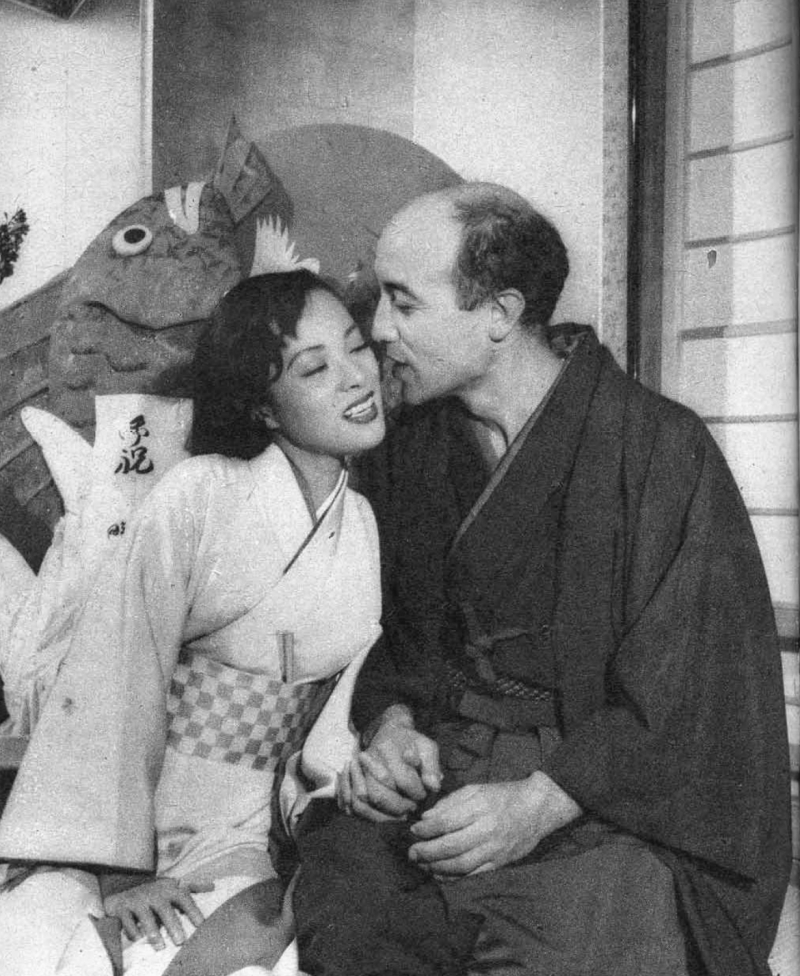
Newly-married Yoshiko Yamaguchi with her husband Isamu Noguchi in Tokyo, 1951

At the end of World War II, Li was arrested in Shanghai by the Kuomintang and sentenced to death by firing squad for treason and collaboration with the Japanese. She was scheduled to be executed at a Shanghai racecourse on December 8, 1945. However, her parents (who were both under arrest in Beijing at the time) managed to produce a copy of her birth certificate to prove she was not a Chinese national and had her Russian friend Lyuba Monosova Gurinets smuggle it into the Shanghai prison with the document hidden inside the head of a geisha doll. Li was cleared of all charges.

In spite of the acquittal the Chinese judges still warned Li to leave China immediately, or she would risk being lynched. In 1946 she repatriated to Japan where she launched a new acting career under the name Yamaguchi Yoshiko, working with directors such as Akira Kurosawa. Several of her post-war films cast her in parts that dealt directly or indirectly with her wartime persona as a bilingual and bicultural performer. For example, in 1949 Shin-Toho studios produced Repatriation (歸國「ダモイ」), an omnibus film which told four stories about the struggles of Japanese trying to return to Japan from the Soviet Union after having been taken prisoner following the defeat. The next year, Yamaguchi starred with actor Ryō Ikebe in Escape at Dawn (曉の脫走), produced by Toho and based on the novel Shunpuden (春婦傳). In the book her character was a prostitute in a military brothel, but for the film adaptation the character was rewritten as a frontline entertainer who falls into a tragic affair with a deserter (Ikebe). In 1952 Yamaguchi appeared in Woman of Shanghai (上海の女), in which she reprised her pre-war persona as a Japanese woman passing for Chinese who becomes caught between the two cultures.

In the early 1950s she branched out as Shirley Yamaguchi in Hollywood films and on Broadway (in the short-lived musical Shangri-La) in the U.S. She married Japanese-American sculptor Isamu Noguchi in 1951. As a Japanese who had grown up in China, Yamaguchi felt torn between two identities and later wrote that she had been attracted to Noguchi as someone who was also between two identities. She spent time between 1953 and 1954 in Vancouver, Canada. After divorcing Noguchi in 1956, she revived the Li Hsiang-lan name and appeared in several Chinese-language films made in Hong Kong. Some of her 1950s Chinese films were destroyed in a studio fire and have not been seen since their initial releases. Her Mandarin hit songs from this period include "Three Years" (三年), "Plum Blossom" (梅花), "Childhood Times" (小時候), "Only You" (只有你), and "Heart Song" (心曲 – a cover of Charlie Chaplin's "Eternally").

== TV presenter and politician ==
She returned to Japan and after retiring from the world of film in 1958, she appeared as a hostess and anchorwoman on TV talk shows. As a result of her marriage to the Japanese diplomat Hiroshi Ōtaka, she lived for a while in Burma (modern Myanmar). They remained married until his death in 2001.

In 1969, she became the host of The Three O'Clock You (Sanji no anata) TV show on Fuji Television, reporting on the Israeli-Palestinian conflict as well as the Vietnam War. In the 1970s, Yamaguchi became very active in pro-Palestinian causes in Japan and personally favored the Palestine Liberation Organization. In 1974, she was elected to the House of Councilors (the upper House of the Japanese parliament) as a member of the Liberal Democratic Party, where she served for 18 years (three terms). She co-authored the book, Ri Kōran, Watashi no Hansei (Half My Life as Ri Kōran). She served as a vice-president of the Asian Women's Fund. As part of the 1993 fall honors list, she was decorated with the Gold and Silver Star of the Order of the Sacred Treasure, Second Class.

Yamaguchi was considered by many Chinese in the post-World War II period to be a Japanese spy and thus a traitor to the Chinese people. This misconception was caused in part by Yamaguchi passing herself off as Chinese throughout the 1930s and 1940s. Her Japanese identity not being officially revealed until her post-war prosecution nearly led to her execution for treason as a hanjian. She had always expressed her guilt for taking part in Japanese propaganda films in the early days of her acting career. In 1949, the People's Republic of China was established by the Communist Party, and three years later, Yamaguchi's former repertoire from the Shanghai era in the 1930s and 1940s (along with all other popular music) was also denounced as Yellow music (黃色音樂), a form of pornography. Because of this, she did not visit China for more than 50 years after the war, since she felt that the Chinese had not forgiven her. Despite her controversial past, she influenced future singers such as Teresa Teng, Fei Yu-Ching, and Winnie Wei (韋秀嫻), who covered her evergreen hits. Jacky Cheung recorded a cover of Kōji Tamaki's "行かないで" ("Ikanaide") and renamed it "Lei Hoeng Laan." (Both the original version and subsequent remake do not have any actual references to Li Hsiang-lan. The Chinese title instead refers to the unknowable quality and identity of the singer's lover.) In January 1991, a musical about her life was released in Tokyo, which generated controversy because its negative portrayal of Manchukuo upset many Japanese conservatives.

Yamaguchi was one of the first prominent Japanese citizens to acknowledge the Japanese brutality during wartime occupation. She later campaigned for greater public awareness of that part of history and advocated paying reparations to so-called comfort women, women of various nationalities who were forced into sex slavery by the Japanese military during the war.

A recording of a 1950 concert performance in Sacramento, California, was discovered by a professor from the University of Chicago in 2012. The concert included six songs and was performed before an audience of Japanese Americans, many of whom had likely been interned during World War II. Speaking in 2012 about the concert, Yamaguchi said, "I sang with hope that I could offer consolation to the Japanese Americans, as I heard that they had gone through hardships during the war." She died at the age of 94 in Tokyo on September 7, 2014, exactly ten years after one of her fellow Seven Great Singing Stars, Gong Qiuxia.

== Names ==
She was credited as Shirley Yamaguchi in the Hollywood movies, Japanese War Bride (1952), House of Bamboo (1955), and Navy Wife (1956). She was once nicknamed The Judy Garland of Japan.

Other names used as movie actress:

- Li Hsiang-lan
- Li Hsiang Lan
- Ri Kōran
- Li Xiang Lan
- Hsiang-lan Li
- Xianglan Li
- Li Xianglan
- Yoshiko Yamaguchi

== Selected filmography ==
Year	Title	Role
1938	蜜月快車 (Mí yùe kuài chē / Honeymoon Express)	Bride
1939	富貴春夢 (Fùguì Chūnmèng)	
1939	冤魂復仇 (Yuānhún Fùchóu)	
1939	鐵血慧心 (Tǐe xǔe hùi xīn)	
1939	白蘭の歌 (Byakuran no uta / Song of the White Orchid)	Li Hsueh-hsiang
1940	東遊記 (Toyuki / Journey to the East)	Liqin, a typist
1940	支那の夜 (Shina no Yoru / China Nights)	Chinese orphan
1940	孫悟空 (Monkey King)	Oriental Woman
1940	熱砂の誓い (Nessa no Chikai / Vow in the Hot Sand)	Li Fangmei
1941	君と僕 (Kimi to boku / You and I)	
1941	蘇州の夜 (Soshū no yoru / Suzhou Night)	
1942	迎春花 (Yíng chūn hūa)	
1943	戦ひの街 (Tatakai no machi / Fighting Street)	
1943	サヨンの鐘 (Sayon no kane / Sayon's Bell)	Sayon
1943	誓ひの合唱 (Chikai no gassho / The Choir's Vow)	
1943	萬世流芳 (Wàn Shì Liú Fāng / Eternity)	
1944	野戦軍楽隊 (Yasen gungakutai / Military Band on the Battlefield)	Ai Ran
1944	私の鶯 (Watashi no uguisu / My Japanese Nightingale)	
1948	わが生涯のかゞやける日 (Waga shōgai no kagayakeru hi / The Most Beautiful Day of My Life)	
1948	幸運の椅子 (Kōun no isu / Seat of Fortune)	
1948	情熱の人魚 (Jōnetsu no ningyō / Mermaid of Passion)	
1949	帰国(ダモイ) (Damoi / Repatriation)	
1949	人間模様 (Ningen moyō / Human Patterns)	
1949	流星 (Ryūsei / Shooting Star)	
1949	果てしなき情熱 (Haté shinaki jōnetsu / Passion without End)	
1950	暁の脱走 (Akatsuki no dasso / Escape at Dawn)	Harumi
1950	醜聞 (Shubun / Scandal)	Miyako Saijo 西条美也子
1952	Japanese War Bride	Tae Shimizu
1952	霧笛 (Muteki / Foghorn)	
1952	戦国無賴 (Sengoku burai / Sword for Hire)	Oryo
1952	上海の女 (Shanhai no onna / Woman of Shanghai)	Li Lili (Singer)
1952	風雲千両船 (Fuun senryobune)	
1953	抱擁 (Hōyō / The Last Embrace)	Yukiko Nogami
1954	土曜日の天使 (Doyōbi no tenshi / Sunday's Angel)	
1954	The United States Steel Hour	Presento
1955	金瓶梅 (Jīn Píng Méi)	Pan Jinlian
1955	House of Bamboo	Mariko
1955	The Red Skelton Hour	Guest vocalist
1956	Navy Wife	Akashi
1956	白夫人の妖恋 (Byaku fujin no yōren / The Legend of the White Serpent)	Madam White
1957	Robert Montgomery Presents (The Enemy)	Hana
1957	神秘美人 (Shénmì měirén / The Lady of Mystery)	
1958	一夜風流 (Yí yè fēng líu / The Unforgettable Night)	Ge Qiuxia
1958	アンコール・ワット物語 美しき哀愁 (Ankoru watto monogatari utsukushiki aishu / The Princess of Angkor Wat)	
1958	東京の休日 (Tōkyō no kyūjitsu / A Holiday in Tokyo)	Mary Kawaguchi

== See also ==
- Three Girls Revitalizing Asia, girl group including Yamaguchi and Bai Guang
