= Bai Guang =

Chinese actress and singer (1921–1999)

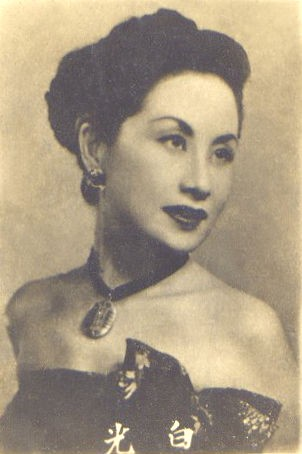
- Bai Guang in 1949
- Born: Shi Yongfen (史永芬); 27 June 1921; Zhuozhou, Republic of China
- Died: 27 August 1999 (aged 78); Kuala Lumpur, Malaysia
- Burial place: Nirvana Memorial Park, Semenyih, Malaysia
- Occupations: Actress, singer
- Years active: 1943–1959
- Spouse: Yan Lianglong (m. 1969)
- Musical career
- Origin: Shanghai, China
- Genres: Shidaiqu, Mandopop

Chinese name
- Chinese: 白光
Transcriptions
Standard Mandarin
- Hanyu Pinyin: Bái Guāng
- IPA: [pǎɪ kwáŋ]
Yue: Cantonese
- Jyutping: Baak6 Gwong1
- IPA: [pak̚˨ kʷɔŋ˥]

Shi Yongfen (Chinese: 史永芬; pinyin: Shǐ Yǒngfēn; 27 June 1921 – 27 August 1999), known professionally as Bai Guang (Chinese: 白光; pinyin: Bái Guāng; lit. 'White Light'; also credited as Pai Kwong, Bai Kwong and Bai Kwang), was a Chinese actress and singer. By the 1940s, she became one of the Seven Great Singing Stars.

== Early life ==
Shi Yongfen was born in 1921 in Zhuozhou, Hebei. Her father was a quartermaster under general Shang Zhen. In her early years, she was a student of the Beiping Salon Theatrical Troupe (北平沙龍劇團; Běipíng Shālóng Jùtuán), and once performed Cao Yu's play Sunrise. In 1937, she studied at the University of Tokyo's music department until World War II in 1942. After drama school, she wanted to be a movie star. As she proclaimed, she wanted to be like the beams of light coming off the movie projectors onto the big screen; hence her stage name.

== Career ==
In an age and culture where light, high voices were usually favored, Bai had a slightly deep voice, which helped her become a big star as the "Queen of the Low Voice" (低音歌后). Some of her hits were "Autumn Evening" (秋夜), "Without You" (如果沒有你), "The Pretender" (假正經), "Revisiting Old Dreams" (魂縈舊夢), and "Waiting For You" (等著你回來). In 1940, she and Yoshiko Yamaguchi, also among the Seven Great Singing Stars, were recruited to the Three Girls Revitalizing Asia (興亜三人娘) group, where they performed a Japanese-language propaganda song about the union between Japan, China and Manchukuo.

Bai began her film career in 1943. She was known for playing seductive roles due to her flirtatious image on screen and has also played villains at times.

After the war, Bai moved to Hong Kong and joined Great Wall Pictures. In 1949, A Forgotten Woman (蕩婦心) was shown in Hong Kong, which then-governor Alexander Grantham became fond of. A year later, she quit acting, moved to Japan and successfully opened a nightclub in Tokyo's Ginza district in 1953. The union did not last and she returned to Hong Kong, recording some music through 1959 when she officially retired.

In 1969, Bai resettled in Kuala Lumpur, Malaysia, where she married a man 20 years her junior named Yan Lianglong (颜良龙; 顏良龍), who was also one of her fans. She performed to wide acclaim in 1979 in Kaohsiung, Taiwan. Her last public appearance was in 1995 on a Hong Kong television show.

== Death ==
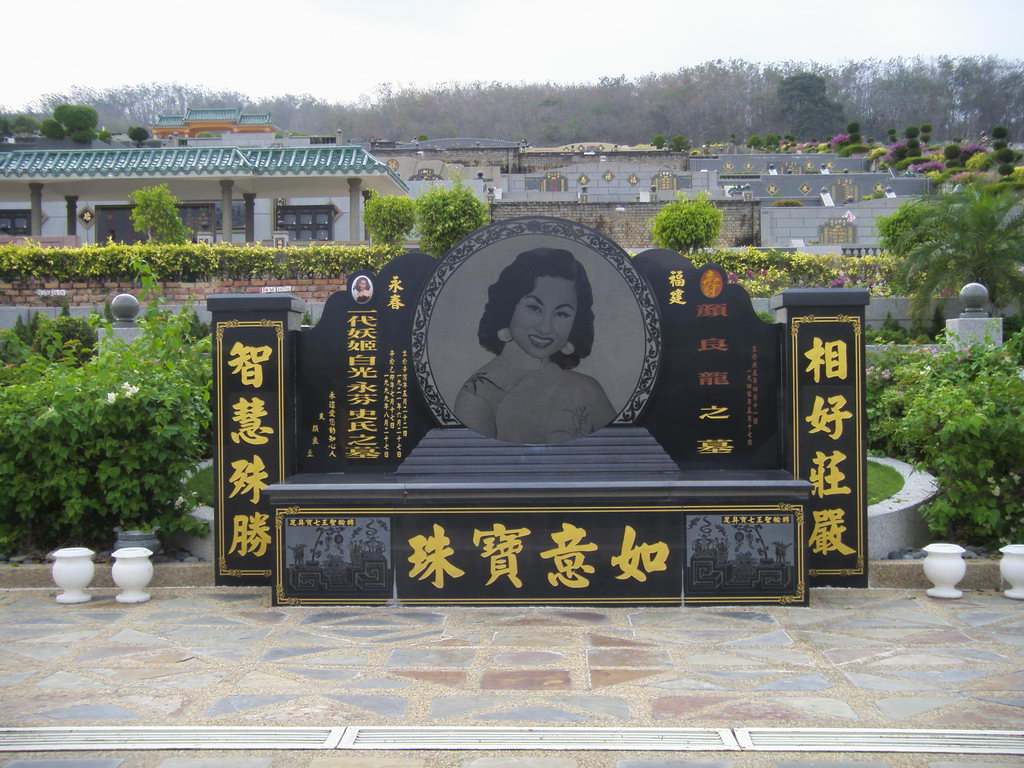
Bai's tomb, dated prior to her husband's death

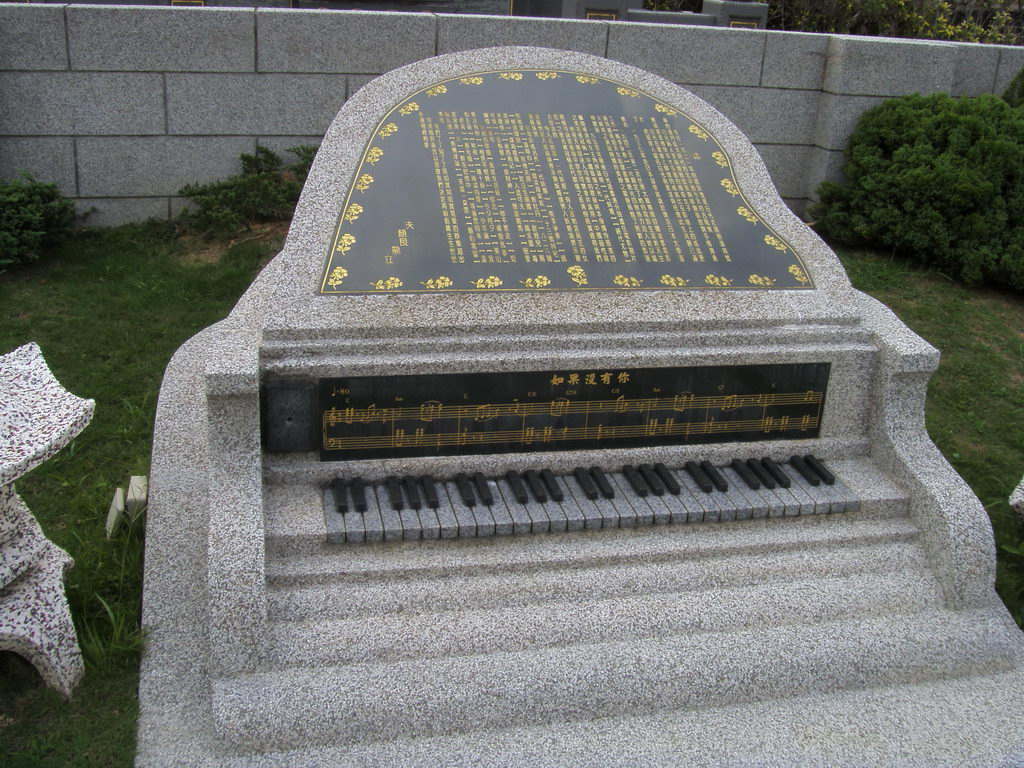
The unusual piano tomb, with the inscription of her biography and the musical sheet of her song "Without You" (如果沒有你). It is said that the song starts playing when anyone approaches the tomb.

Bai Guang died from colon cancer on 27 August 1999, at the age of 78, in her house at Kuala Lumpur's Damansara Heights suburb. She was buried at the Nirvana Memorial Park, Semenyih.

== Filmography ==
- Love Peas of the South (紅豆生南國) (1943)
- The Fire of Love (戀之火) (1945)
- Sinister House 13 (十三號凶宅) (1947)
- Spy Ring 626 (六二六間諜網) (1948)
- Blood Stained Begonia (血染海棠紅) (1949)
- A Forgotten Woman (蕩婦心) (1949)
- Songs in the Rainy Nights (雨夜歌聲) (1950)
- A Strange Woman (一代妖姬) (1950)
- Hours Passed the Wedding (結婚廿四小時) (1950)
- Smiling Rose (玫瑰花開) (1951)
- Tears of a Songstress (歌女紅菱艷) (1953)
- Fresh Peony (鮮牡丹) (1956)
