= Pathé Records (China) =

Hong Kong record label

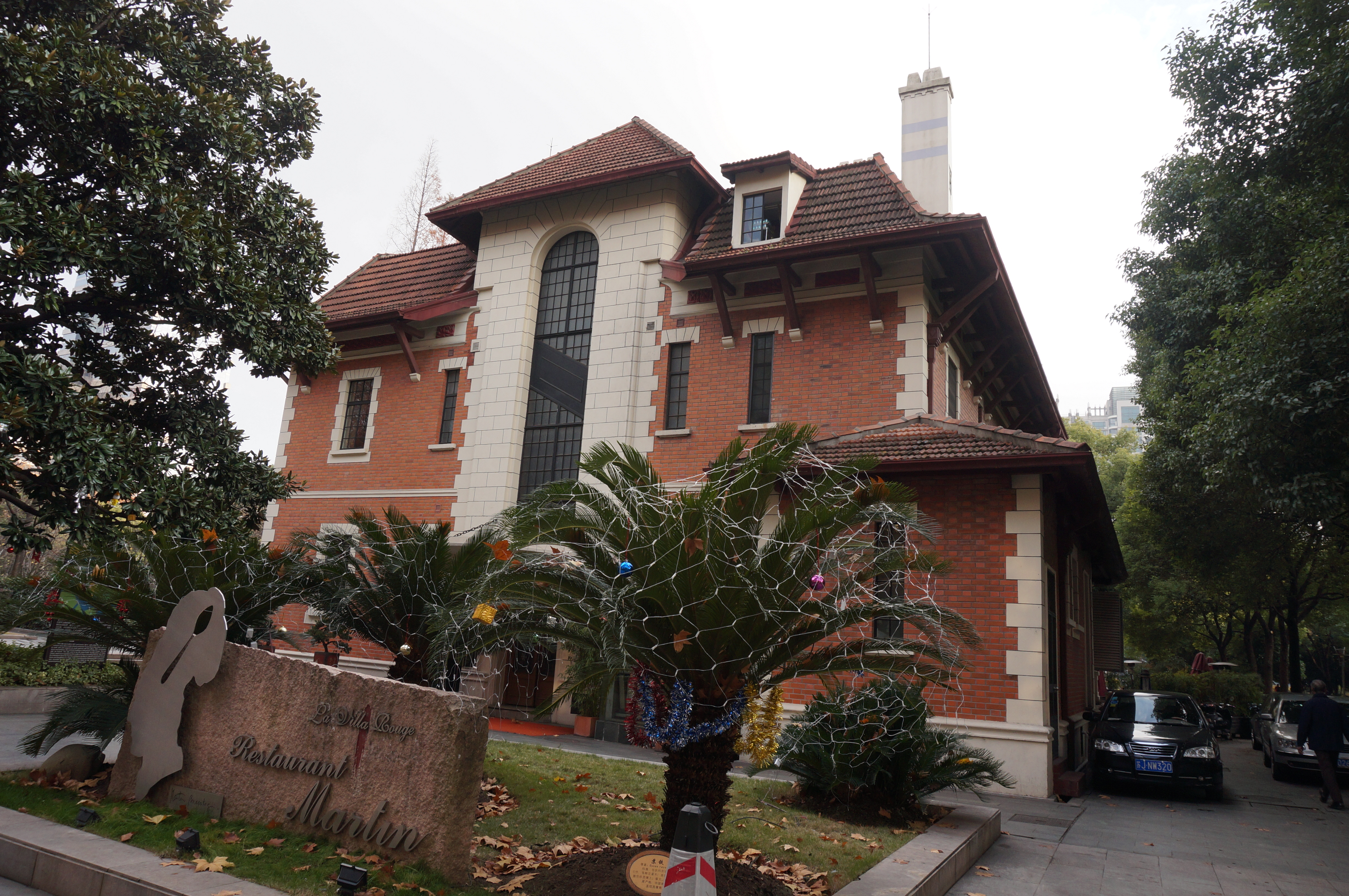
Former headquarters of Pathé Records in Xujiahui, Shanghai

The Shanghai Pathé Record Company (Chinese: 上海百代唱片公司; pinyin: Shànghǎi Bǎidài Gōngsī Chàngpiàn; Cantonese Yale: Baakdoih Cheungpín) was one of the first major record companies in Shanghai, Republic of China, and later relocated to colonial British Hong Kong following the establishment of the People's Republic of China. The company was an Asia-Pacific subsidiary of the Pathé Records based in France, and later of EMI Group, which was broken up in 2012.

== History ==

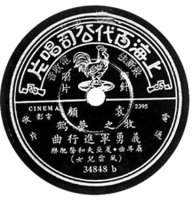
March of the Volunteers, now China's national anthem, was released by Pathé Shanghai in the Republic of China in 1935

Around the beginning of the 20th century, a young Frenchman named Labansat set up an outdoor stall on Tibet Road in Shanghai and played gramophone records to Chinese citizens who were curious. The phonograph was purchased from Moutrie and Company, and he charged anyone 10 cents to listen to a novelty record called "Laughing Foreigners" (洋人大笑). Anyone capable of resisting any laughs or chuckles got their money back. Phonographs were becoming popular in the city in 1906. By 1908, he received help from a French engineer and an assistant from Ningbo and established "Pathé Orient" (東方百代), also known as "Pathé Asia," though other sources point to the renaming in 1921.

Originally specialising only in Peking Opera, the company later expanded into Chinese pop music. Mandarin popular songs became hits, and they were sold at stores like Wing On in Shanghai.

In 1930, Pathé's factory was taken over by Columbia Records in Shanghai and was used to press Odeon and Beka with the manufacturing portion named "China Record Co. Ltd," and the distributor continued as Pathé Orient. In the same decade, Pathé went under British EMI, which was originally seeking to make a profit on The Bund selling gramophone records. Ren Guang became Pathé-EMI’s new director and began getting involved with leftist music devoted to the proletarian cause. In 1937 Ren was fired from the company when the leftist music was cut off by the Japanese military officials. Any Japanese plants were also taken back to the Nipponophone Company (日本蓄音器株式会社).

From the late 1930s to the 1940s, the company held the rights to 90% of the mandopop songs.

On October 1, 1949, the People's Republic of China was established by the Chinese Communist Party (CCP). In 1952, the CCP accused Pathé's factory in Shanghai of promoting pornography. Under Chairman Mao Zedong, popular music produced and performed before 1952 was denounced as Yellow Music. As a result of the accusation, Pathé was immediately forced to stop cutting records, close down its factory and cease operations.

Pathé subsequently moved its main office from communist Shanghai to colonial British Hong Kong and started to cut records in Hong Kong (which there were made in China before moving its production to India in 1950), thus restoring the glory of Shanghainese pop music in the British colony of the Far East of the Asia-Pacific region. In the same year, Pathé Records entered a public-private joint venture with the state-run China Record Corporation (formerly People's Records and the China Record Company from 1954) in Shanghai as one of its commercial wings to continue to sell all of Pathé Shanghai's records made in India into communist Mainland China under its Shanghai Pathé Record Company (上海百代公司唱片) name.

After the communist victory in Mainland China, the Kuomintang government of the Republic of China retreated to Taiwan and Pathé Records also set up local operations in Taipei.

Pathé Hong Kong faced fierce competition in the 1960s with the rise of Diamond Records and eventually ceased Shanghainese pop production and cut Cantopop instead, which gained popularity in the mainland China the early 1970s.

Pathé Hong Kong later changed its English name to EMI Hong Kong but retained its original Chinese name. In 2012 the entire EMI Group was broken up and sold to various companies. Pathé Hong Kong was absorbed into Universal Music Hong Kong, a division of Universal Music Asia-Pacific.

== See also ==
- Music of Asia
- Music of the Middle East
- Music of China
- Music of Hong Kong
- Music of Macau
- Music of Taiwan
- Music of India
- Music of Saudi Arabia
- Music of Egypt
