= Yellow music =

Genre of music in China

- Stylistic origins: Shidaiqu; jazz; film music; Chinese folk music; Chinese yellow music; Enka (Japan); (Korea); Taiwanese Hokkien popular music (Taiwan)

Yellow music is a genre of popular music. The term has been used in China to describe types of music that have separate origins.

== China ==
Yellow music (simplified Chinese: 黄色音乐; traditional Chinese: 黃色音樂; pinyin: huángsè yīnyuè) or yellow songs (simplified Chinese: 黄色歌曲; traditional Chinese: 黃色歌曲; pinyin: huángsè gēqǔ) was a label used to describe early generations of shidaiqu, i.e. Chinese popular music in Shanghai from the 1920s to the 1940s. The color yellow is associated with eroticism and sex in the country, since 黄, huáng, the Mandarin character for "yellow", also means "erotic". The Chinese Communist Party saw pop music as sexually indecent and labeled the C-pop genre as such. These restrictions prompted many Shanghai artists to flee to Hong Kong, where it reached its height in the 1950s until the late 1960s, when it was displaced by Mandarin-language Taiwanese pop (and later by Cantopop). The term was used continually up to the Cultural Revolution. By the early 1980s, however, yellow music could be performed again.

== Vietnam ==
Yellow music (nhạc vàng) refers to music produced in the State of Vietnam and South Vietnam, and also referring to its flag being mostly yellow, named in opposition to "red music" (nhạc đỏ) endorsed by the Communist government of North Vietnam, officially the Democratic Republic of Vietnam. The genre contained topics and characteristics considered decadent and was banned in 1975, with those caught listening to it punished, and their music confiscated. Most yellow music has been associated with the bolero genre. After the Fall of Saigon, many Vietnamese artists emigrated to the United States to pursue their careers and industry there instead. The ban on yellow music was lightened in 1986, but by then the music industry had ceased to exist.

In the 1990s, Vietnam's Ministry of Culture, Sports and Tourism promoted the "nhạc xanh" genre (literally "green music", which refers to music for young generations) to divert people from listening to yellow music, but with little success.

At the beginning of the 21st century, various yellow music concerts were held in Vietnam. In August 2010, two singers – Hương Lan and Tuấn Vũ – performed at the Hanoi Opera House for half a month.

== See also ==
- C-pop
- Mandopop
- Cantopop
- Bolero
