= Zhang Lu (singer) =

Chinese singer and actress

- 張露
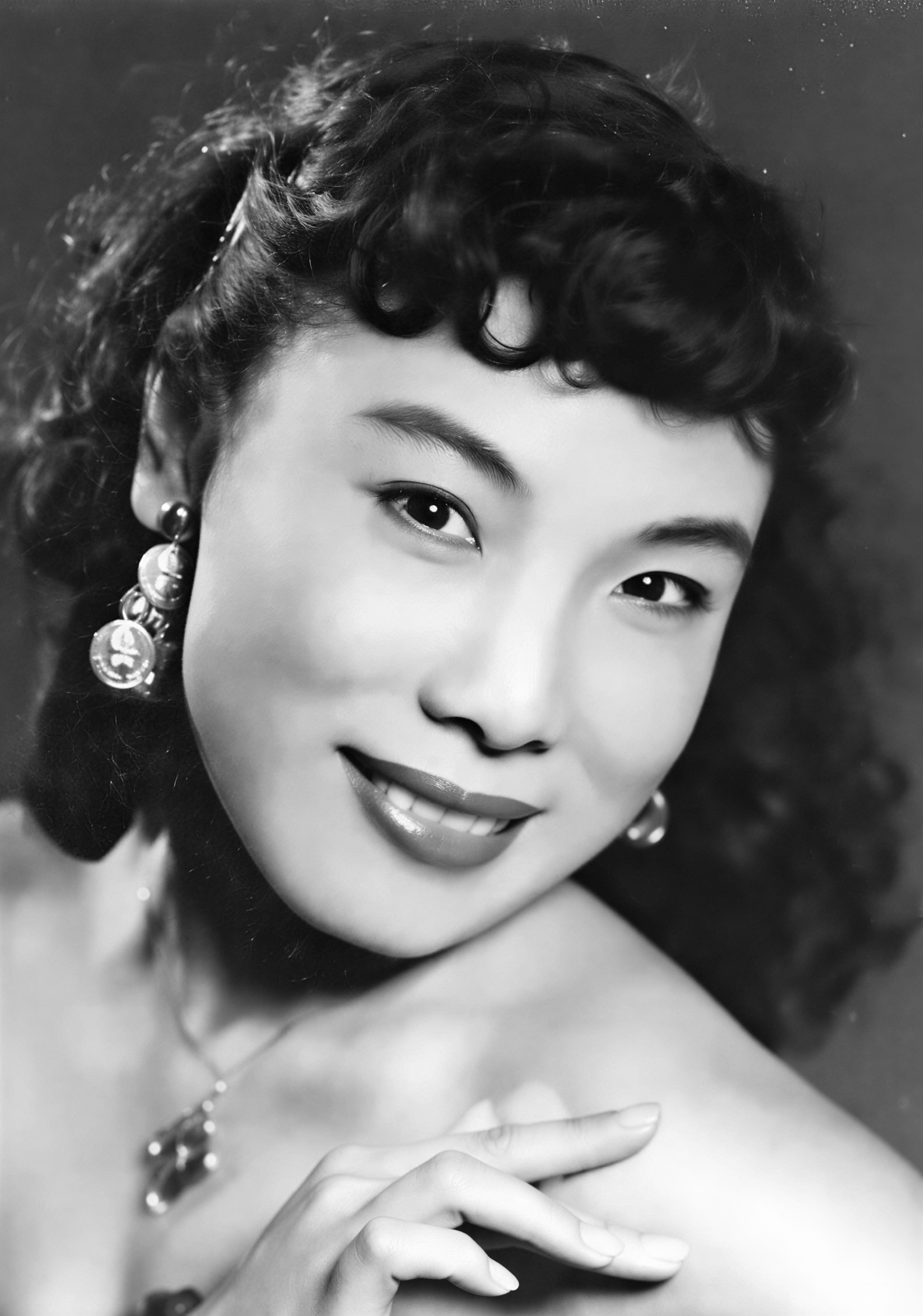
- Born: Zhang Xiuying; January 21, 1932; Suzhou, China
- Died: January 26, 2009 (aged 77); Hong Kong
- Occupations: Pop singer and actress

Zhang Lu (Chinese: 張露; January 21, 1932 – January 26, 2009), often written Chang Loo, was a Chinese singer and actress, known as a pioneer in Chinese pop beginning in the 1940s.

== Biography ==
She was born Zhang Xiuying (张秀英) in Suzhou in 1932. Her family moved to Shanghai when she was a young child.

Zhang was discovered in the mid-1940s by her neighbor, a broadcaster, who recommended her to sing at a local radio station. She started out singing covers of popular Zhou Xuan songs. By the late 1940s, she had signed with EMI.

She released a series of hits songs, becoming popular in both Shanghai and Hong Kong. "给我一个吻" ("Give Me a Kiss"), a Mandarin cover of "Seven Lonely Days," became one of her best-known songs. Other hits included "小小羊儿要回家," "不许他回家," and "迎春花" ("Little Lamb is Going Home," "Don't Let Him Go Home," and "Winter Jasmine," respectively).

She was considered a pioneer of Chinese pop music in this period, singing in both Chinese and English and incorporating jazz styles. Zhang also worked as an actress, including in the films Prisoner of Love in 1951 and The Lark in 1965.

In 1952, she moved to Hong Kong. She married the Filipino musician Ollie Delfino, whom she had met while performing in Singapore, in the late 1950s. The couple had two sons, Orlando and Alex To.

Zhang retired in 1975 and moved to Canada in the following decade. She returned to Hong Kong when her son Alex became a successful performer, and she occasionally returned to the public eye to perform with him. She died in Hong Kong in 2009, at age 76.

Her music saw a revival in popularity in 2003, when her songs "All the Stars in the Sky" and "The Plough Song" were remixed for the compilation The Original Shanghai Divas. In 2019, her song "Tiao Yi Ge Man Bo" appeared in Season 3 of the American show The Marvelous Mrs. Maisel.
