= Singer season 6 =

Sixth season of television series

Singer
- Season 6
- Judges: 500 public audiences
- Winner: Jessie J
- Runner-up: Hua Chenyu
- Finals venue: Hunan Broadcasting System

Release
- Original network: Hunan Television
- Original release: January 12 – April 20, 2018

Season chronology
- ← Previous; Season 5 Next → Season 7

Singer 2018 is the sixth season of the Chinese television series Singer, a rebranded version of I Am a Singer that aired on Hunan Television. It is produced by Hong Tao, and its music director is Hong Kong senior musician Kubert Leung. The first episode was recorded in the Hunan Broadcasting System Radio and Television Center, Changsha, Hunan on December 28, 2017 and premiered on January 12, 2018 and ended on April 20, 2018. For the first time this series, YouTube provided English captions for the show.

On April 13, 2018, British singer Jessie J was declared winner of Singer 2018, and was the first non-Chinese and foreign singer to win I Am a Singer. Chinese singers Hua Chenyu and Wang Feng were placed second and third, respectively.

== Competition rules ==
As like the previous seasons of I Am a Singer and Singer 2017, Singer 2018 was divided into four rounds of three stages, and seven singers performed for a 500-member audience each week. Similar to the previous series, the total votes cast from both Qualifiers and Knockouts determined which singer was eliminated from the competition.

This series features a modification to the Challenge rounds, with the Challenger entering the competition starting at the Knockout rounds instead of Challenge round (where a new substitute singer would enter the competition instead). Challengers must avoid last place on their first week in addition to finishing in the top four on the second week (in a combination of both knockout and challenge rounds) to be declared safe; failing either challenge instantly eliminates the singer from the competition.

A new pre-voting introduced in the season, Pre-Audience Voting, replaces the Singer Voting which debuted in season 3. Midway after the fourth performance, the audience were asked to make early predictions on which three singers would receive the most votes after the remaining performances of that episode. Similar to Singer Voting, Pre-audience voting has no impact onto the outcome of the competition (with one exception, see below) and does not count towards the audience's vote count.

The announcement of results was also changed, with only the results for the top four revealed during the Qualifiers, while the remaining results (bottom three) would not be revealed until the Knockouts; in most cases, they could choose their performance order by ballot for the next night.

== Contestants ==
The following Singer 2018 contestants are listed in alphabetical order (singers without a placement for the final is listed as finalist; singers eliminated before the finals are listed as non-finalist; singers withdrew were listed as withdrawn):

Key:

– Winner
– Runner-up
– Third place
– Other finalist
– Withdrew

Contestant	Country / Region	Music Partner	Status	Week Entered	Week Exited	Result
Angela Chang	Taiwan	Ava Shen	Initial singer	Week 1 (Qualifier round 1)	Week 13 (Finals)	Finalist (5th-8th place)
Tien Chong	United Kingdom	Young Yang	Initial singer	Week 1 (Qualifier round 1)	Week 5 (Knockout round 2); Week 12 (Breakout round)	Eliminated
GAI	China	Leo Li	Initial singer	Week 1 (Qualifier round 1)	Week 2 (Knockout round 1)	Withdrew
Hua Chenyu	China	Li Weijia	Substitute singer	Week 4 (Qualifier round 2)	Week 13 (Finals)	Runner-up
Henry Huo	China	Yu Meiren	Challenger	Week 8 (Knockout round 3)	Week 13 (Finals)	Finalist (5th-8th place)
Jessie J	United Kingdom	Jeffrey G	Initial singer	Week 1 (Qualifier round 1)	Week 13 (Finals)	Winner
Sam Lee	Taiwan	Qi Sijun	Initial singer	Week 1 (Qualifier round 1)	Week 3 (Challenge round 1); Week 12 (Breakout round)	Eliminated
James Li	China	Wang Qiao	Subsistute singer	Week 3 (Challenge round 1); Week 12 (Breakout round)	Week 9 (Challenge round 3); Week 13 (Finals)	Finalist (5th-8th place)
Li Xiaodong	China	Mandy Jin	Initial singer	Week 1 (Qualifier round 1)	Week 2 (Knockout round 1); Week 12 (Breakout round)	Eliminated
Juno Su	China	Ryan Zuo	Challenger	Week 2 (Knockout round 1)	Week 6 (Challenge round 2); Week 12 (Breakout round)	Eliminated
KZ Tandingan	Philippines	Jackie Tam	Challenger	Week 5 (Knockout round 2); Week 12 (Breakout round)	Week 9 (Challenge round 3); Week 13 (Finals)	Finalist (5th-8th place)
Tengger	China	Eliza Liang	Substitute singer	Week 7 (Qualifier round 3)	Week 13 (Finals)	Fourth place
Wang Feng	China	Li Rui	Initial singer	Week 1 (Qualifier round 1)	Week 13 (Finals)	Third place
Yisa Yu	China	Shen Mengchen	Substitute singer	Week 10 (Qualifier round 4)	Week 12 (Breakout round)	Eliminated

=== Future appearances ===
Hua Chenyu would appear as a contestant on the eighth season in 2020.

== Results ==
First	Safe	Bottom	Eliminated	Return Performance	Challenger	Challenge Success
Challenge Failure	Breakout Success	Breakout Failure	Winner	Runner-up	Absent	Withdrew

	Singer	Broadcast Date (2018)													
	Singer	Jan 12	Jan 19	Jan 26	Feb 2	Feb 9	Feb 16	Feb 23	Mar 9	Mar 16	Mar 23	Mar 30	Apr 6	Apr 13	
	Singer	1st Round			2nd Round			3rd Round			4th Round		Breakout	Final Round	
	Singer	Qualifying	Knockout	Challenge	Qualifying	Knockout	Challenge	1st Show	Qualifying	Knockout / Challenge	Qualifying	Knockout	Breakout	1st Round	2nd Round
1	Jessie J	1	1	1	2	2	2	3	—	1	3	1	—	—	1
2	Hua Chenyu	—	—	—	1	3	1	1	3	5	2	2	1	—	2
3	Wang Feng	4	3	2	5	4	4	5	1	2	4	6	—	—	3
4	Tengger	—	—	—	—	—	—	2	2	7	1	4	3	—	4
=5	Angela Chang	5	2	6	3	6	3	6	7	3	5	3	—	—	—
=5	James Li	—	—	4	4	7	5	7	5	6	—	—	2	—	—
=5	Henry Huo	—	—	—	—	—	—	—	4	4	7	5	4	—	—
=9	Juno Su	—	5	3	6	5	7	—	—	—	—	—	5	—	—
=9	Yisa Yu	—	—	—	—	—	—	—	—	—	6	7	6	—	—
=9	KZ Tandingan	—	—	—	—	1	6	4	6	8	—	—	7	—	—
=9	Tien Chong	2	8	5	7	8	—	—	—	—	—	—	8	—	—
=9	Sam Lee	6	6	7	—	—	—	—	—	—	—	—	—	—	—
=9	Li Xiaodong	7	7	—	—	—	—	—	—	—	—	—	—	—	—
=9	GAI	3	4	—	—	—	—	—	—	—	—	—	—	—	—

== Competition details ==
=== First round ===
==== Qualifying ====
- Taping Date: January 3, 2018
- Airdate: January 12, 2018

Singer 2018 1st Qualifying Round January 12, 2018 Host: Angela Zhang
Order	Singer	Music Partner	Song Title	Original Singer	Lyricist	Composer	Arranger	Ranking
1	Sam Lee	Qi Sijun	"You and I"	Lady Gaga			Jason Huang	6
1	Sam Lee	Qi Sijun	"What's Up?"	4 Non Blondes	Linda Perry		Jason Huang	6
2	Li Xiaodong	Mandy Jin	"後來"	Rene Liu	Derek Shih	Kiroro	Wu Muchan; Fan Junzhe	7
3	Angela Zhang	Ava Shen	"夢裏花"	Angela Zhang	Wu I-Wei	Xiao Wang Zi; Hua lun	Qu Shicong	5
4	Tien Chong	Young Yang	"Queen Bee" Suite				Rama Liu	2^{[b]}
4	Tien Chong	Young Yang	"舞孃"	Jolin Tsai	Isaac Chen	Miriam Nervo; Olivia Nervo; Greg Kurstin	Rama Liu	2^{[b]}
4	Tien Chong	Young Yang	"Lady Marmalade"	Labelle	Robert Crewe; Kenny Nolan		Rama Liu	2^{[b]}
5	GAI	Leo Li	"滄海一聲笑"	Lo Ta-yu; James Wong Jim; Tsui Hark	James Wong Jim		Song Yang	3^{[c]}
6	Jessie J	Jeffrey G	"Domino"	Jessie J	Lukasz Gottwald; Max Martin; Claude Kelly; Jessie J Henry Russell Walter		Nick Pyo	1
7	Wang Feng	Li Rui	"無處安放"	Wang Feng			Jia Yinan; Huang Yi	4

a. Ranked first in the Pre-Audience Voting
b. GAI's performance was edited out from the episode re-runs and in video-sharing websites, due to his withdrawal (Note: The performance was not cut in Singapore Channel U's broadcast (aired April 28, 2019) in order not to cause broadcast inconsistencies.).

==== Knockout ====
- Taping Date: January 11, 2018
- Airdate: January 19, 2018

The first challenger of the season was Juno Su. Due to Beijing's sudden ban on hip-hop culture, GAI withdraw from the competition; footage on GAI's performances from both episodes (and re-runs) were edited out, and clips of his involvement in the competition were also subsequently removed from video-sharing websites as well. His appearance was neither mentioned nor shown in the later episodes, thus effectively confirming his withdrawal from the competition.

Singer 2018 1st Knockout Round January 19, 2018 Host: Angela Zhang
Order	Singer	Music Partner	Song Title	Original Singer	Lyricist	Composer	Arranger	Ranking
1	Sam Lee	Qi Sijun	"痴心絕對"	Ada Jin; Kwon Vook Vook; Sam Lee; Sammy; Pan Mei-chen	Ponan Tsai		Chen Fei-wu	6
2	Li Xiaodong	Mandy Jin	"消愁"	Mao Buyi			Wu Muchan; Fan Junzhe	7
3	Wang Feng	Li Rui	"普通Disco"	Luo Tianyi; Yanhe	Ilem		Huang Yi	3
4	Angela Zhang	Ava Shen	"阿刁"	Zhao Lei			Kong Deyue; Long Long	2^{[a]}
5	Tien Chong	Young Yang	"Shape of You"	Ed Sheeran	Ed Sheeran; Steve Mac; Johnny McDaid; Kandi Burruss; Tameka Cottle; Kevin Briggs		Tien Chong; Geoff King Luk	8
6	Jessie J	Jeffrey G	"I Have Nothing"	Whitney Houston	David Foster; Linda Thompson		Nick Pyo	1
7	GAI	Leo Li	"難念的經"	Wakin Chau	Albert Leung	Wakin Chau	Rama Liu	Withdrew
8	Juno Su	Ryan Zuo	"再見螢火蟲"	Faye Wong	Albert Leung	C.Y. Kong	Jason Gu	5

a. Ranked first in the Pre-Audience Voting

==== Overall ranking ====
Singer 2018 1st Round overall ranking
Ranking	Singer	Match 1 Percentages of Votes (Ranking)	Match 2 Percentages of Votes (Ranking)	Total percentages of votes
1	Jessie J	27.11% (1)	28.55% (1)	27.83%
2	Angela Zhang	12.31% (5)	19.05% (2)	15.68%
3	Wang Feng	12.65% (4)	16.59% (3)	14.62%
4	GAI^{[a]}	13.40% (3)	13.32% (4)	13.36%
5	Sam Lee	12.18% (6)	10.38% (6)	11.28%
6	Tien Chong	15.99% (2)	4.19% (8)	10.09%
7	Li Xiaodong	6.36% (7)	7.92% (7)	7.14%

a. As GAI withdrew from the competition before the airing of the first knockout round, his results were not publicly announced; his votes were not removed from the count, and instead calculated based on the votes given to other singers.

==== Challenge ====
- Taping Date: January 18, 2018
- Airdate: January 28, 2018

The first substitute singer of the season was James Li. Normally Su was required to place in top four in a combination of both Knockout and Challenge rounds to be declared safe; however, due to GAI's withdrawal from last week, only the scores from the Challenge round determined the outcome alone.

Singer 2018 1st Challenge Round January 26, 2018 Host: Angela Zhang
Order	Singer	Music Partner	Song Title	Original Singer	Lyricist	Composer	Arranger	Ranking
1	Sam Lee	Qi Sijun	"離人"	Jacky Cheung; Terry Lin	Mercy Li	He Jiawen	Kubert Leung; Da Ridan	7
2	Tien Chong	Young Yang	"Hello"	Adele	Adele; Greg Kurstin		Kelvin Avon; Chris Carpio	5
3	Juno Su	Ryan Zuo	"狼"	William Wei			Zeng Yu; NIA	3^{[a]}
4	Li Xiaodong	Mandy Jin	"心的祈禱"	Zang Tianshuo	Huang Xiaomao	Zang Tianshuo	Wu Muchan	Return Performance
5	Angela Zhang	Ava Shen	"全世界失眠"	Eason Chan	Albert Leung	Chen Wei	Kubert Leung; Da Ridan	6
6	Jessie J	Jeffrey G	"Killing Me Softly with His Song"	Lori Lieberman; Roberta Flack	Norman Gimbel	Charles Fox	Nick Pyo	1
7	Wang Feng	Li Rui	"下墜"	Shi Jian-Bo			Huang Yi	2
8	James Li	Wang Qiao	"我要我們在一起"	Mavis Fan	James Li			4

a. Ranked first in the Pre-Audience Voting

===== Total percentages of votes =====
Singer 2018 1st Challenge Round Total percentages of votes
Ranking	Singer	Total percentages of votes
1	Jessie J	25.46%
2	Wang Feng	18.17%
3	Juno Su	16.61%
4	James Li	13.07%
5	Tien Chong	10.21%
6	Angela Zhang	9.53%
7	Sam Lee	6.94%

=== Second round ===
==== Qualifying ====
- Taping Date: January 25, 2018
- Airdate: February 2, 2018

The second substitute singer of the season was Hua Chenyu.

Singer 2018 2nd Qualifying Round February 2, 2018 Host: Angela Zhang
Order	Singer	Music Partner	Song Title	Original Singer	Lyricist	Composer	Arranger	Ranking
1	Wang Feng	Li Rui	"兒時"	Liu Haolin	Tang Yingfeng	Liu Haolin	Huang Yi	5
2	James Li	Wang Qiao	"愛的箴言"	Teresa Teng	Lo Ta-yu		Huang Yang	4
3	Jessie J	Jeffrey G	"Flashlight"	Jessie J	Sia; Christian Guzman; Jason Moore; Sam Smith		Nick Pyo	2^{[b]}
3	Jessie J	Jeffrey G	"Earth Song"	Michael Jackson			Nick Pyo	2^{[b]}
4	Angela Zhang	Ava Shen	"Bésame Despacito" medley				Long Long	3
4	Angela Zhang	Ava Shen	"Bésame Mucho"	Emilio Tuero	Consuelo Velázquez		Long Long	3
4	Angela Zhang	Ava Shen	"Despacito"	Luis Fonsi; Daddy Yankee	Luis Fonsi; Erika Ender; Daddy Yankee		Long Long	3
5	Tien Chong	Young Yang	"我"	Leslie Cheung	Albert Leung	Leslie Cheung	Kelvin Avon; Chris Carpio	7
6	Juno Su	Ryan Zuo	"她"	William Wong			Zeng Yu; Bi Jianbo	6
7	Hua Chenyu	Li Weijia	"齊天"	Hua Chenyu	Ding Yanxue; Jin Hezai; Fang Hao	Hua Chenyu	Zheng Nan	1
8	Sam Lee	Qi Sijun	"安靜"	Jay Chou			Terence Teo	Return Performance

a. Ranked first in the Pre-Audience Voting

==== Knockout ====
- Taping Date: February 1, 2018
- Airdate: February 9, 2018

The second challenger of the season was KZ Tandingan.

Singer 2018 2nd Knockout Round February 9, 2018 Host: Angela Zhang
Order	Singer	Music Partner	Song Title	Original Singer	Lyricist	Composer	Arranger	Ranking
1	Tien Chong	Young Yang	"不在乎"	Tien Chong	Hippie Zhao; Xu Xu	Tien Chong	Kelvin Avon; Chris Carpio	8
1	Tien Chong	Young Yang	"One Day I'll Fly Away"	Randy Crawford	Joe Sample; Will Jennings		Kelvin Avon; Chris Carpio	8
2	Jessie J	Jeffrey G	"Ain't Nobody"	Rufus; Chaka Khan	Hawk Wolinski		Nick Pyo	2^{[a]}
3	James Li	Wang Qiao	"秋意濃"	Jacky Cheung; Winnie Goh	Daryl Yao	Koji Tamaki	Huang Yang	7
4	Wang Feng	Li Rui	"Mr.Man"	Man Jiang	Wan Laining	Man Jiang	Huang Yi	4
5	Angela Zhang	Ava Shen	"來過我生命的你"	Audio Monster	Ivyan Yan	Sean He; Wang Zitong	Chen Di	6
6	Hua Chenyu	Li Weijia	"孩子"	Westloft	Hsiang Yueh-e	Westloft	Zheng Nan; Hua Chenyu	3
7	Juno Su	Ryan Zuo	"舍離斷"	Hollis He			Zeng Yu; Baby Chung	5
8	KZ Tandingan	Jackie Tam	"Rolling in the Deep"	Adele	Adele; Paul Epworth		Rama Liu	1

a. Ranked first in the Pre-Audience Voting

==== Overall ranking ====
Singer 2018 2nd Round Episode 4–5 overall ranking
Ranking	Singer	Match 1 Percentages of Votes (Ranking)	Match 2 Percentages of Votes (Ranking)	Total percentages of votes
1	Jessie J	27.58% (2)	28.29% (2)	27.93%
2	Hua Chenyu	27.94% (1)	24.63% (3)	26.28%
3	Wang Feng	7.66% (5)	18.25% (4)	12.95%
4	Angela Zhang	14.89% (3)	8.47% (6)	11.68%
5	James Li	11.13% (4)	7.60% (7)	9.36%
6	Juno Su	7.09% (6)	8.82% (5)	7.95%
7	Tien Chong	3.69% (7)	3.93% (8)	3.81%

==== Challenge ====
- Taping Date: February 9, 2018
- Airdate: February 16, 2018

Singer 2018 2nd Challenge Round February 16, 2018 Host: Angela Zhang
Order	Singer	Music Partner	Song Title	Original Singer	Lyricist	Composer	Arranger	Ranking
1	Wang Feng	Li Rui	"所有人都在玩手機"	Mosaic Band	Zhuo Yue		Huang Yi	4
1	Wang Feng	Li Rui	"夜貓"	Mosaic Band	Zhuo Yue		Huang Yi	4
2	Jessie J	Jeffrey G	"Purple Rain"	Prince; The Revolution	Prince		Nick Pyo	2
3	Hua Chenyu	Li Weijia	"雙截棍"	Jay Chou	Vincent Fang	Jay Chou	Zheng Nan; Hua Chenyu	1^{[a]}
4	KZ Tandingan	Jackie Tam	"你不知道的痛" medley				Rama Liu	6
4	KZ Tandingan	Jackie Tam	"你還要我怎樣"	Joker Xue			Rama Liu	6
4	KZ Tandingan	Jackie Tam	"你不知道的事"	Wang Leehom	Wang Leehom; Rui Ye	Wang Leehom	Rama Liu	6
4	KZ Tandingan	Jackie Tam	"還隱隱作痛"	Power Station	Yu Chiu-hsin		Rama Liu	6
5	James Li	Wang Qiao	"眼色"	Yoga Lin	James Li; Xiao Lin	James Li	Huang Jianyi; Li Shihai	5
6	Juno Su	Ryan Zuo	"賊"	Penny Tai			NIA	7
7	Angela Zhang	Ava Shen	"情人流浪記"	Matzka Band	Lin Ban Ge		Terence Teo; James Yeo	3
7	Angela Zhang	Ava Shen	"流浪記"	Panai Kusui			Terence Teo; James Yeo	3
8	Tien Chong	Young Yang	"走鋼索的人"	James Li	Kevin Yi	James Li	Kelvin Avon; Chris Carpio	Return Performance
8	Tien Chong	Young Yang	"Tightrope"	Janelle Monáe	Nathaniel Irvin III; Charles Joseph II; Antwan Patton; Janelle Monáe Robinson		Kelvin Avon; Chris Carpio	Return Performance

a. Ranked first in the Pre-Audience Voting

==== Overall ranking ====
Singer 2018 2nd Round Episode 5–6 overall ranking
Ranking	Singer	Match 2 Percentages of Votes (Ranking)	Match 3 Percentages of Votes (Ranking)	Total percentages of votes
1	Hua Chenyu	19.46% (3)	26.11% (1)	22.78%
2	Jessie J	22.36% (2)	19.67% (2)	21.01%
3	KZ Tandingan	26.08% (1)	9.59% (6)	17.83%
4	Wang Feng	14.42% (4)	11.38% (4)	12.90%
5	Angela Zhang	6.69% (6)	16.86% (3)	11.77%
6	James Li	6.00% (7)	10.83% (5)	8.41%
7	Juno Su	6.97% (5)	5.55% (7)	6.26%

=== Third round ===
==== First Show ====
- Taping Date: February 10, 2018
- Airdate: February 23, 2018

The third substitute singer of the season was Tengger. For this week, the results for this round was void due to Jessie J's illness on the following week (See Qualifiers below).

Singer 2018 3rd Round 1st Show February 23, 2018 Host: Angela Zhang
Order	Singer	Music Partner	Song Title	Original Singer	Lyricist	Composer	Arranger	Ranking
1	Hua Chenyu	Li Weijia	"我管你"	Hua Chenyu	Guo Deziyi	Hua Chenyu	Zheng Nan	1^{[c]}
2	Angela Zhang	Ava Shen	"追夢人"	Fong Fei-fei; Evon Low	Lo Ta-yu		Qu Shicong	6
3	Jessie J	Jeffrey G	"Never Too Much"	Luther Vandross			Nick Pyo	3
4	KZ Tandingan	Jackie Tam	"Say Something"	A Great Big World; Christina Aguilera	Ian Axel; Chad King; Mike Campbell		KZ Tandingan; Makoy Portado	4
5	James Li	Wang Qiao	"一生所愛"	Shu Qi	Wendy Zheng	Lowell Lo	Yan Jun	7
6	Wang Feng	Li Rui	"的青春"	Erbai			Huang Yi	5
7	Tengger	Eliza Liang	"天堂"	Tengger			Da Ridan	2
8	Juno Su	Ryan Zuo	"身後"	A-mei	Hush	JJ Lin	NIA; Baby Chung	Return Performance

a. Ranked first in the Pre-Audience Voting

==== Qualifying ====
- Taping Date: February 28, 2018
- Airdate: March 9, 2018

The final challenger of the season was Henry Huo; Huo came in fourth and was temporarily declared safe. Normally, this round would have featured elimination; however, eliminations were cancelled as Jessie J was too ill to perform during rehearsal; Jessie would have perform "My Heart Will Go On", but actually performed the song the following week.

Singer 2018 3rd Qualifying Round March 9, 2018 Host: Angela Zhang
Order	Singer	Music Partner	Song Title	Original Singer	Lyricist	Composer	Arranger	Ranking
1	KZ Tandingan	Jackie Tam	"Real Gone"	Sheryl Crow	Sheryl Crow; John Shanks		Rama Liu	6
2	Hua Chenyu	Li Weijia	"易燃易爆炸"	Chen Li	Shang Mengdi; Pian Tan	Chen Li	Long Long	3
3	Angela Zhang	Ava Shen	"在人間"	Wang Jianfang	Long Zhangjian; Ivyan Yan	Rodney Jerkins; Andre Lindal; Lauren Christy	Long Long; Zheng Nan	7
4	Wang Feng	Li Rui	"再也沒有"	Ryan.B; AY	Ryan.B; Ying Wu Suo Wang; AY	Ryan.B	Huang Yi	1^{[b]}
5	James Li	Wang Qiao	"哪怕我很小"	Roger Yang	James Li; Lin Hai	James Li	Zhao Zhao	5
6	Tengger	Eliza Liang	"懷念戰友"	Li Shirong	Lei Zhenbang		Da Ridan	2
6	Tengger	Eliza Liang	"花兒為什麼這樣紅"	Tajik folk song	Unknown		Da Ridan	2
7	Henry Huo	Yu Meiren	"紅顏劫"	Yao Beina	Cui Shu	Liu Huan	Zheng Wei; Tian Mi; Henry Huo	4

a. Ranked first in the Pre-Audience Voting

==== Knockout/Challenge ====
- Taping Date: March 7, 2018
- Airdate: March 16, 2018

As Jessie J was able to return after being absent in the previous week, this week featured a double elimination (any two singers with the two lowest votes, or one if Huo fails the Challenge). Tandingan and Hua were initially going to perform 1st and 3rd, respectively, but both orders were swapped on mutual agreement after Tandingan not wished to perform first after doing so on last week and Hua volunteered in taking her place.

Singer 2018 3rd Knockout/Challenge Round March 16, 2018 Host: Angela Zhang
Order	Singer	Music Partner	Song Title	Original Singer	Lyricist	Composer	Arranger	Ranking
1	Hua Chenyu	Li Weijia	"山海"	No Party for Cao Dong			Zheng Nan; Hua Chenyu	5
2	Tengger	Eliza Liang	"絨花"	Li Guyi	Liu Guofu; Tian Nong	Wang Ming	Da Ridan	7
3	KZ Tandingan	Jackie Tam	"Royals"	Lorde	Lorde; Joel Little		KZ Tandingan; Ivan Lee Espinosa	8
4	Angela Zhang	Ava Shen	"追夢赤子心"	GALA Band	Su Duo		Ji Yuan; Wang Nana	3^{[a]}
5	Wang Feng	Li Rui	"等待"	Huang Qishan	Wang Feng		Huang Yi	2
6	Henry Huo	Yu Meiren	"小草"	Fang Xinhua	Xiang Tong; He Zhaohua	Wang Zujie; Zhang Zhuoya	Zheng Wei; Tian Mi; Henry Huo	4
6	Henry Huo	Yu Meiren	"Princess Mononoke" (partly in Italian)	Yoshikazu Mera	Hayao Miyazaki	Joe Hisaishi	Zheng Wei; Tian Mi; Henry Huo	4
7	James Li	Wang Qiao	"想愛你"	David Wong	David Wong; Wang Chi-san	David Wong	Nick Pyo	6
8	Jessie J	Jeffrey G	"My Heart Will Go On"	Celine Dion; Celtic Woman	Will Jennings	James Horner	Nick Pyo	1

a. Ranked first in the Pre-Audience Voting

==== Overall ranking ====
Singer 2018 3rd Round Episode 8–9 overall ranking
Ranking	Singer	Match 2 Percentages of Votes (Ranking)^{[b]}	Match 3 Percentages of Votes (Ranking)	Total percentages of votes
1	Wang Feng	18.33% (1)	15.09% (2)	16.71%
2	Hua Chenyu	16.00% (3)	13.07% (5)	14.53%
3	Henry Huo	15.60% (4)	13.21% (4)	14.40%
4	Jessie J	Absent^{[a]} (8)	27.23% (1)	13.61%
5	Tengger	17.53% (2)	6.10% (7)	11.81%
6	Angela Zhang	7.33% (7)	14.75% (3)	11.04%
7	James Li	15.33% (5)	6.50% (6)	10.91%
8	KZ Tandingan	9.86% (6)	4.02% (8)	6.94%

a. Jessie J's score for that round was zero (and was ranked 8th) as a result of her absence on the Qualifying rounds.
b. Has a gap of 45 votes between the top five singers, with a difference of four votes cast between the 4th and 5th place singer.

=== Fourth round ===
==== Qualifying ====
- Taping Date: March 15, 2018
- Airdate: March 23, 2018

Yisa Yu was the final substitute singer of the season.

Singer 2018 4th Qualifying Round March 23, 2018 Host: Angela Zhang
Order	Singer	Music Partner	Song Title	Original Singer	Lyricist	Composer	Arranger	Ranking
1	Jessie J	Jeffrey G	"Ain't No Mountain High Enough"	Marvin Gaye; Tammi Terrell	Nickolas Ashford; Valerie Simpson		Nick Pyo	3
2	Henry Huo	Yu Meiren	"你好嗎 少年"	Henry Huo	He Jiale	Sanbao	Tian Mi	7
3	Hua Chenyu	Li Weijia	"假行僧"	Cui Jian			Hua Chenyu	2
4	Wang Feng	Li Rui	"忘了我"	Li Ou			Huang Yi	4^{[a]}
5	Tengger	Eliza Liang	"從頭再來"	Cui Jian			Cang Lang Band; Da Ridan	1
6	Angela Zhang	Ava Shen	"再見青春"	Wang Feng			Long Long	5
7	Yisa Yu	Shen Mengchen	"C'est la Vie"	Emerson, Lake & Palmer	Peter Sinfield	Greg Lake	Zheng Nan	6
7	Yisa Yu	Shen Mengchen	"飛鳥與魚"	Chyi Yu		Chyi Chin	Zheng Nan	6
8	KZ Tandingan	Jackie Tam	"See You Again" (mixed in English and Mandarin)	Wiz Khalifa; Charlie Puth	Wiz Khalifa; Charlie Puth; Andrew Cedar; Dann Hume; Justin Franks; Josh Hardy; Phoebe Cockburn		Kong Xiao Yi	Return Performance
9	James Li	Wang Qiao	"My Way"	Frank Sinatra	Paul Anka	Claude François; Jacques Revaux	Simon Qi	Return Performance

a. Ranked first in the Pre-Audience Voting

==== Knockout ====
- Taping Date: March 22, 2018
- Airdate: March 30, 2018

Singer 2018 4th Knockout Round March 30, 2018 Host: Angela Zhang
Order	Singer	Music Partner	Song Title	Original Singer	Lyricist	Composer	Arranger	Ranking
1	Wang Feng	Li Rui	"空空如也"	Ren Ran	Xue Wuying		Huang Yi	6
2	Angela Zhang	Ava Shen	"Walking Through the Clouds" medley				Long Long	3
2	Angela Zhang	Ava Shen	"不害怕"	Angela Zhang	Jennifer Hsu	Zac Maloy; Tommy Henriksen; Sofi Bonde	Long Long	3
2	Angela Zhang	Ava Shen	"歐若拉"	Angela Zhang	Shih Li	Lee Tien-Lung	Long Long	3
2	Angela Zhang	Ava Shen	"不痛"	Angela Zhang	Huang Yun-Ru; Chen Hwai-En	Chen Hwai-En	Long Long	3
2	Angela Zhang	Ava Shen	"遺失的美好"	Angela Zhang	Daryl Yao	Real Huang	Long Long	3
2	Angela Zhang	Ava Shen	"隱形的翅膀"	Angela Zhang	Wang Ya-Chun		Long Long	3
2	Angela Zhang	Ava Shen	"手心的太陽"	Angela Zhang	Daryl Yao	Peng Kang-Shen	Long Long	3
3	Yisa Yu	Shen Mengchen	"秦淮景"	Xu Huifen; Wu Jianfang; Zhang Jianzhen	Qigang Chen		Chen Di	7
3	Yisa Yu	Shen Mengchen	"舊夢"	Julia Peng	Peng Chi-Kang; Chen Dieyi	Lee Cheng-Fan; Yao Min	Chen Di	7
4	Tengger	Eliza Liang	"離不開你"	Liu Huan	Zhu Yigong	Liu Huan	Baby Chung	4^{[a]}
5	Hua Chenyu	Li Weijia	"平凡之路"	Pu Shu	Han Han; Pu Shu	Pu Shu	Zheng Nan; Hua Chenyu	2
6	Jessie J	Jeffrey G	"Reflection"	Christina Aguilera	David Zippel	Matthew Wilder	Nick Pyo	1
7	Henry Huo	Yu Meiren	"茉莉花"	Jiangsu folk song Zeng Lin	Jiangsu folk song Daryl Yao	Jiangsu folk song Lee Cheng-Fan	Lao Zai	5

a. Ranked first in the Pre-Audience Voting

==== Overall ranking ====
Singer 2018 4th Round overall ranking
Ranking	Singer	Match 1 Percentages of Votes (Ranking)	Match 2 Percentages of Votes (Ranking)	Total percentages of votes
1	Hua Chenyu	19.35% (2)	20.77% (2)	20.06%
2	Jessie J	14.77% (3)	21.64% (1)	18.20%
3	Tengger	22.27% (1)	12.42% (4)	17.34%
4	Angela Zhang	12.37% (5)	16.23% (3)	14.30%
5	Wang Feng	12.59% (4)	8.81% (6)	10.70%
6	Henry Huo	8.00% (7)	12.09% (5)	10.04%
7	Yisa Yu	10.62% (6)	8.01% (7)	9.31%

=== Breakout ===
- Taping Date: March 30, 2018
- Airdate: April 6, 2018

Three of the six singers who were initial singers (Chang, Jessie J and Wang) were exempt for this round, while the other three singers would participate along with previously eliminated singers (except for GAI) for a chance to enter the finals. The performance order were determined through the contestant's status quo and their duration on the stage, with the three remaining non-initial singers (Hua, Huo, and Tengger), as well as James Li (by-virtue on performing the longest (seven shows) among other singers) chose the performance order, while remaining singers drew their lots to decide the order; the order for the first four performers with a white-colored envelope are told not to open it until the start of the episode- Tien and Yu drew the gold-colored envelopes and were given their orders as fifth and sixth, respectively.

For the first time in the show's history, interim eliminations occur during the Pre-Audience Voting: midway through the fourth and seventh performance, the 500-members cast one vote to save a singer- the singer receiving the fewest votes after each round of the Pre-Audience Voting will be eliminated immediately (breakout failure).

The singers sang one song, and the four singers (of the remaining eight) having the most votes qualified for the finals. Hua, James Li, Tengger, KZ & Huo were the top five singers who received the highest number of votes and advanced to the finals.

Singer 2018 Breakout April 6, 2018 Host: Angela Zhang
Order	Singer	Music Partner	Song Title	Original Singer	Lyricist	Composer	Arranger	Ranking
1	Li Xiaodong	Mandy Jin	"我心常自在"	Li Xiaodong			Huang Juncong	– ^{[a]}
2	KZ Tandingan	Jackie Tam	"Anak" (Tagalog/Mandarin)	Freddie Aguilar			He Qi	4
3	Sam Lee	Qi Sijun	"說散就散"	JC; Tia Ray	Cheung Cho Kiu	Ronald Ng	Terence Teo	– ^{[a]}
4	Juno Su	Ryan Zuo	"紅眼睛"	Isabelle Huang	Shan Qingqing	Chang Shilei	An Dong	6
5	Tien Chong	Young Yang	"玫瑰玫瑰我愛你"	Yao Li; Angel Lee; Joanna Wang; Sharon Au	Wu Cun	Chen Gexin	Kelvin Avon; Chris Carpio	8
6	Yisa Yu	Shen Mengchen	"影子"	Wu Qiong	Ray Wang		Chen Di	7
7	James Li	Wang Qiao	"Sunny II"	Bobby Hebb	Lin Hai	Bobby Hebb	B6	2
8	Henry Huo	Yu Meiren	"卷珠簾"	Henry Huo	Li Shu; Luna	Henry Huo	An Dong; Song Siheng; Tian Mi	5
9	Tengger	Eliza Liang	"父親的草原母親的河"	Dedema	Xi Murong	Ulaantga	Cang Lang Band; Da Ridan	3
10	Hua Chenyu	Li Weijia	"我"	Leslie Cheung	Albert Leung	Leslie Cheung	Long Long; Hua Chenyu	1

a. Eliminated midway for finishing last during Pre-Audience Voting.

==== Total percentages of votes ====
Singer 2018 Breakout Total percentages of votes
Ranking	Singer	Total percentages of votes^{[a]}
1	Hua Chenyu	22.99%
2	James Li	18.40%
3	Tengger	15.31%
4	Henry Huo	12.10%
5	Juno Su	11.66%
6	Yisa Yu	10.00%
7	KZ Tandingan	6.30%
8	Tien Chong	3.20%

a. The percentage counting towards the total votes does not include votes cast from Xiaodong and Lee, who were the first and second singers, respectively, to be eliminated during the Pre-Audience Voting.

=== Finals ===
- Airdate: April 13, 2018

The finals were divided into two rounds, with the first song being a duet with a guest singer, and the second song being a solo encore performance. Similar to the previous season, votes cast were the sole determinant of the season's winner.

==== Round 1 ====
The first round of the finals was a guest singer's duet. The grouping was decided by the singers starting with the most wins prior to the Breakouts (if there is a tie in terms of wins, a prior online vote serves as a tiebreak); each group can consist of either two or three members, meaning that two groups will be head-to-head and one being a three-way. After the groups are decided, one member drew lots to decide the order of performance for this round. The result of the grouping are reflected in the table below.

The singer with the highest number of votes on each group directly advanced to Round 2, leaving four singers eligible for the save through a re-vote; the singer receiving the highest number of votes cast will be saved and also advance to the second round.

Legend	Group 1	Group 2	Group 3

Singer 2018 Finals Round 1 April 13, 2018 Host: He Jiong
Order	Singer	Music Partner	Guest Singer	Song Title	Original Singer	Lyricist	Composer	Arranger	Result
1	Tengger	Eliza Liang	Wu Bixia	"Go Forward Boldly, Jiu'er" medley				Daridan	Saved
1	Tengger	Eliza Liang	Wu Bixia	"妹妹你大膽地往前走"	Zhang Yimou; Jiang Wen	Zhang Yimou	Zhao Jiping	Daridan	Saved
1	Tengger	Eliza Liang	Wu Bixia	"九兒"	Han Hong	He Qiling; A-kun	A-kun	Daridan	Saved
2	Jessie J	Jeffrey G	Coco Lee and KZ Tandingan	"Bang Bang"	Jessie J Ariana Grande; Nicki Minaj	Max Martin; Savan Kotecha; Rickard Göransson; Onika Maraj		Nick Pyo	Advanced
2	Jessie J	Jeffrey G	Coco Lee and KZ Tandingan	"龍拳"	Jay Chou	Vincent Fang	Jay Chou	Nick Pyo	Advanced
3	Henry Huo	Yu Meiren	Cecilia Han	"飄雪"	Cecilia Han	Lin Hai	Ryoki Matsumoto	Bi Hechen	Eliminated
4	Angela Zhang	Ava Shen	Mao Buyi	"花房姑娘"	Cui Jian			Long Long; Chen Shimu; Yang Ming	Eliminated
4	Angela Zhang	Ava Shen	Mao Buyi	"We Are the Champions"	Queen	Freddie Mercury		Long Long; Chen Shimu; Yang Ming	Eliminated
5	Wang Feng	Li Rui	Sitar Tan	"Hey Jude"	The Beatles	Lennon-McCartney		Huang Yi	Advanced
6	James Li	Wang Qiao	Kit Chan	"Endless Love"	Diana Ross; Lionel Richie	Lionel Richie		Qi Yanfeng	Eliminated
7	Hua Chenyu	Li Weijia	G.E.M.	"光年之外"	G.E.M.			Zheng Nan; Hua Chenyu	Advanced

Had Henry Huo, Angela Zhang and James Li advanced to the next round, they would've performed "被遺忘的時光", "Faded" and "再見憂傷" as their encore songs, respectively.

==== Round 2 ====
The second round of the finals is an encore song, and the singer receiving the highest number of votes (this vote was separate from the Round 1 vote) was crowned as the winner. The order for this round was determined by ballot, except for Tengger who would perform first for being the last to advance to Round 2.

Singer 2018 Finals Round 2 April 13, 2018 Host: He Jiong
Order	Singer	Music Partner	Song Title	Original Singer	Lyricist	Composer	Arranger	Result
1	Tengger	Eliza Liang	"蒼狼大地"	Tengger	Buheaosir; Tengger	Tengger	Daridan	4
2	Hua Chenyu	Li Weijia	"吶喊"	Angela Zhang	Deepwhite		Zheng Nan; Hua Chenyu	2
3	Jessie J	Jeffrey G	"I Will Always Love You"	Whitney Houston	Dolly Parton		Nick Pyo	1
4	Wang Feng	Li Rui	"我愛你中國"	Wang Feng			Huang Yi	3

==== Winner of Battle ====
Jessie J was declared the winner of Singer 2018 with 47.49% of the votes cast, leading by a 21.84% margin ahead of runner-up Hua. Prior to the announcement, it was revealed that Hua's performance from week four ("齊天") won the "Most Popular Song" of the season.

Singer 2018 Results of Winner of Battle
Ranking	Singer	Percentages of Votes
1	Jessie J	47.49%
2	Hua Chenyu	25.65%
3	Wang Feng	16.83%
4	Tengger	10.03%

=== Biennial Concert ===
- Airdate: April 20, 2018

The concert features 11 singers, which include singers from the last season Dimash Kudaibergen, Lion, Tia Ray and Diamond Zhang, as well as all of the seven finalists (Angela Zhang, Hua Chenyu, Henry Huo, Jessie J, James Li, Tengger and Wang Feng).

Singer 2018 Biennial Concert April 20, 2018 Host: He Jiong
Order of Group	Order of Performance	Team	Singer	Song Title	Original Singer	Lyricist	Composer	Arranger
1	1	Classic Voices	Tengger	"一簾幽夢"	Shiao Lih-ju	Chiung Yao	Liu Chia-chang	Daridan
1	2	Classic Partnerships	Angela Zhang; Henry Huo	"寓言"	Angela Zhang	Wang Ya-Chun	Andrew Chen	Zheng Wei
1	2	Classic Partnerships	Angela Zhang; Henry Huo	"Liberian Girl"	Michael Jackson			Zheng Wei
1	3	Classic Works	Lion	"我們的愛"	F.I.R.	F.I.R. Félicité Hsieh	F.I.R.	Kenn C James Yeo
2	4	Classic Partnerships	Tia Ray; Victor Ma	"下個，路口，見"	Li Yuchun			Chen Hanwen; Chang Shilei
2	5	Classic Works	Hua Chenyu	"微光"	Hua Chenyu	Zhou Jieying	Qian Lei	Hua Chenyu
2	6	Classic Voices	Wang Feng	"出走"	Cui Jian			Huang Yi
3	7	Classic Works	Diamond Zhang	"我變了 我沒變"	Aska Yang	Xiao Ke		Zheng Nan
3	8	Classic Partnerships	James Li; David Wong	"說…錯"	David Wong	Lou Wen-Chung	David Wong	Zheng Wei
3	9	Classic Voices	Dimash Kudaibergen	"Hello"	Lionel Richie			Erlan Bekchurin
4	10	—	Jessie J Luke James	"I'll Be There"	The Jackson 5	Berry Gordy; Bob West; Willie Hutch; Hal Davis		Nick Pyo
