= Pandora (Angela Zhang album) =

- Regular edition cover

Studio album by Angela Chang
- Released: January 1, 2006
- Genre: Mandopop
- Language: Mandarin
- Label: Linfair Records

Angela Chang chronology
Aurora (2004)	Pandora (2006)	Flower in the Wonderland (2007)

Alternative cover
- Bump Off Lover edition cover

Pandora (Chinese: 潘朵拉; pinyin: Pānduǒlā) is the third Mandarin studio album by Taiwanese–Canadian singer Angela Zhang. It was released on January 1, 2006, by Linfair Records. It is the fifth best selling album in Taiwan with 88,000 copies sold in 2006.

== Release ==
Pandora was released on January 1, 2006. The Pandora (Bump Off Lover Edition) (Chinese: 潘朵拉2006繽紛愛殺版; pinyin: Pānduǒlā Èrlínglíngliù Bīnfēn Ài Shā Bǎn) was released on February 24, 2006, with a bonus DVD containing seven music videos and Taiwanese drama Bump Off Lover sneak peeks.

== Songs ==
The track "Pandora" (潘朵拉) was nominated for Top 10 Gold Songs at the Hong Kong TVB8 Awards, presented by television station TVB8, in 2006. "Invisible Wings" (隱形的翅膀) won one of the Top 10 Songs of the Year, at the 2007 Hito Radio Music Awards presented by Taiwanese radio station Hit FM.

== Track listing ==
1. "隱形的翅膀" (Invisible Wings)
2. "潘朵拉" (Pandora)
3. "香水百合" (Water Lily)
4. "真的" (Really)
5. "最近" (Recent)
6. "驚天動地" (Shaken World)
7. "保護色" (Protective Color)
8. "口袋的天空" (Pocket's Sky)
9. "愛情旅程" (Love Journey)
10. "喜歡你沒道理" (Like You without Reason)
11. "永晝" (Day Time Forever)

== Bonus DVD ==
Pandora (Bump Off Lover Edition)

1. "潘朵拉" (Pandora) MV
2. "隱形的翅膀" (Invisible Wings) MV
3. "真的" (Really) MV
4. "喜歡你沒道理" (Like You without Reason) MV
5. "香水百合" (Water Lily) MV
6. "口袋的天空" (Pocket's Sky) MV
7. "保護色" (Protective Color) MV
8. Bump Off Lover sneak peeks

== Charts ==
=== Weekly charts ===
Chart (2006)	Peak position
Taiwanese Albums (G-Music)	3

=== Year-end charts ===
Chart (2006)	Position
Taiwanese Albums (Note: Best-selling albums of the year in Taiwan as reported by media outlets)	5
