= The Teen Age =

Taiwanese television series

- Promo poster
- Also known as: 18, Censoring or Not? 18禁不禁?
- 18禁不禁
- Genre: Romance, Comedy, Teen drama
- Directed by: Ming Chin-cheng; Ke Han Chen 柯翰辰; Zhou Jie Ru 周介如
- Starring: Ah Ben 阿本; Li Jia Wen 李嘉文; Ah Mei丫美; Xiao Cao 小草; Albee Huang; Michelle Chang 張家寧; Amanda Chou 周曉涵; Carmen Tang 唐以菲
- Opening theme: SHA LA LA by EaStyle 翼勢力
- Ending theme: Donut 甜甜圈 by Albee Huang 小薰 and Ah Ben 阿本
- Country of origin: Taiwan
- Original language: Mandarin
- No. of episodes: 20= 15+5 (Bonus with high ratings)

Production
- Executive producers: Ke Yi-qín 柯以勤; Hu Níng Yuan 胡寧遠
- Production location: Taiwan
- Running time: 90 minutes
- Production company: Duo Man Ni Ltd. 多曼尼 Ltd

Original release
- Network: CTS; GTV
- Release: 29 April – 9 September 2007

Related
- Corner with Love; Romantic Princess

The Teen Age (Chinese: 18禁不禁; pinyin: 18 Jīn Bu Jìn), also known as 18, Censoring or Not?, is a 2007 romance, comedy and teen Taiwanese drama starring Ah Ben, Ah Mei and Xiao Cao, Li Jia Wen, Albee Huang, Michelle Chang, Amanda Chou and Carmen Tang. Filming took place at Kuang-Fu High School located in Hsinchu City Taiwan and New Taipei Municipal San-Chung Commercial and Industrial Vocational High School located in New Taipei City Taiwan. The drama centers around high school students as they deal with their studies, growing up and interacting with different sexes while going through adolescents. Originally intended to have only 15 episodes, 5 episodes was added due to high ratings. The drama began airing on CTS on April 29, 2007 every Sunday at 22:00 PM and repeated every following Saturday on channel GTV at 21:00 PM. It finished airing on September 9, 2007 with 20 episodes total. The drama has become a cult hit among teenage audiences and has been re-aired on GTV 9:00 PM Monday to Friday time slot in 2011 and 2012.

== Plot ==
Comedic view of high school life. Each episode is a different topic on typical high school life.

Zhao Zhi Jie is an average 17-year-old boy who is going through puberty and daydreams about girls but it is hard for him to interact with the different sex when the high school he attends does not allow boys and girls to interact with each other. Also his dad can't seem to have the courage to talk to him about the "birds and the bees". So the information he hears about girls are only from his classmates who are as clueless as him.

Zhi Jie meets Xia Nian Qiao in an online chat room. The two hit it off and decide to meet face to face, but due to information that his friends pass to him about what girls are like and what they want the two have a misunderstanding and Nian Qiao leaves their meet up thinking he is a pervert. Zhi Jie excitedly finds out that Nian Qiao actually attends the same school as him, wanting to apologize for their earlier meet up misunderstanding he is soon further misunderstood and labeled as the school pervert when girls from the school see porn videos falling out from his school bag that his friends had secretly stuffed into his book bag.

The conflict between the girls and the boys gets worsen. The school guidance counselor persuades the school director to make an experimental class by joining females and males into one class. The guidance counselor ensures the school director that having the boys and girls interact with each other will bring peace between the two sexes. Conflict between the boys and girls in the experimental class erupts from the first day, since the girls have never had any interactions with the male students they see all the boys as perverts who only think about sex and hit on girls all day, and the boys see the girls as a bunch of controlling bossy bitches who want to run and control the entire class.

== Cast ==
=== Main cast ===
Main roles are played by four boys and four girls. The story tells about love teenager school who want to get relationship with each boyfriends and girlfriends, they feel all feelings, emotions, hardships, struggle, responsibilities and many more to show their love story.

=== Students ===
- Ah Ben as Zhao Zhi Jie (Episodes 01-20)

He is a typical 17-year-old boy going through puberty. He meets Xia Nian Qiao in an online chat room. On the day they had schedule to meet face to face they have a misunderstanding. He soon finds out that Nian Qiao attends the same school as him, wanting to apologize for the earlier misunderstanding they encounter another misunderstanding and he is soon label as the school pervert by all the girls.

- Li Jia Wen 李嘉文 as Guo Jia Lin (Episodes 01-20)

The brains of his class. Even though he is short and fat he does not get bullied by others. He is very cocky and arrogant because of his intelligence and uses this as a way to bully others.

- Ah Mei as Pang De Feng (Episodes 01-20)

The athlete and muscles of the class. He's very athletic but not very good with his studies. He is clueless about Yun Hao's crush on him and sees her as a guy friend. As he gets to know Yun Hao better he likes her back but is too shy to tell her.

- Xiao Cao 小草 as Du Jian Xin (Episodes 01-20)

The pervert of the class. He has been collecting pornography since he was young. He clams to know all about girls and the "birds and the bees". He is also known to be the most annoying boy at school. He tends to offend people without caring about their feelings. He has a crush on Pei Jun, but he thinks she likes him too because he is so arrogant.

- Albee Huang as Xia Nian Qiao (Episode 01 - 15 and cameo at the end of storylines)

She meets Zhao Zhi Jie in an online chat room and wanted to meet with him face to face. At first she thought he was a nice guy but a misunderstanding between them leads to her assuming he is a pervert. When she is bullied too much she becomes a very scary and violent person.

- Michelle Chang 張家寧 as Hao You Jia (Episodes 01- 20)

The class president voted in an unfair election by all the girls in the class. She seems like a sweet person but she also has a violent side. She has confidence issues because of her flat chest which leads her to stuffing her bra.

- Amanda Chou as Liang Pei Jun (Episodes 01-20)

The most non-violent one of the girl group. She is very popular with all the boys at school because of her sweet gentle looks and personality. She is aware of her popularity amongst the boys and uses it to her advantage. Jia Lin and Jian Xin both have crushes on her but she doesn't pay much attention to them and thinks Jian Xin is very annoying.

- Carmen Tang 唐以菲 as Ji Yun Hao (Episodes 01-20)

The most violent one of the girl group. She thinks all boys are only interested in girls for their looks and body. She solves everything with her fist. She develops a crush on De Feng after seeing his bravery when he saved the school director and also catching him at work at his after school job.

=== Secondary Main Character Cast ===
- Party Huang Kai Mei 黃凱玫 as Cao Mei (Episodes 17 - 20 replace Xiao Nian Qiao Character)

The new girl of the class. She is clumsy and un-socialize. She is also not too bright. Pei Jun gives her a makeover. She joins the group after Nian Qiao is sent abroad for her studies.she become socialize while her friends company her at the school's competition.

==== Supporting roles ====
Support roles is played by anyone who has helped main roles and each cast of roles is only appeared in a few episodes (although 1- 3 episodes only) but support roles helped main roles to solve their each problems.

=== School staff ===
- Blackie Chen as School Superintendent

The school superintendent. His family has owned the school for four generations. The school director is terrified of him. He was originally please when he heard that his school was going to have an experimental class, but after seeing the conflict between the girls and boys he was no longer pleased.

- Faye as Teacher Ann

The school guidance counselor. She is the voice of reason at the school. She tries to help Zhi Jie resolve his problem at school but seeing how the girls and boys can't get along with each other at the school she persuades the school director to have an experimental class.

- Ming Chin-cheng as School director Wang

The school director. Thinking that the students would concentrate on their studies if they have no interactions, but his strict segregation between the two sexes leads to a lot of students sneaking off together.

- Shatina Chen 陳思璇 as Ye Xiao Tong teacher

The new class teacher. She is extremely strict with the girls but it's only because she wants the girls to be equal to the boys.

- Dylan Kuo as PE teacher

The new Phys ed teacher at the school. He is laid-back, tall and handsome. The girls have crushes on him immediately. He was a championship runner but decided not to run anymore due to the death of his girlfriend.

=== Others ===
- Renzo Liu 劉亮佐 as Zhao Zhi Jie's father

Zhao Zhi Jie's father. He doesn't know how to talk to his son about puberty questions and acts like a friend instead.

- James Mao 毛加恩 as Wang Shao Wei

The new male student of the class, because of his tall and handsome appearance he becomes very popular with all the girls in the class which makes all the other boys in the class jealous of him.

- Michael Zhang 張勛杰 as Street performer

A street saxophone player Zhi Jie and Nian Qiao encounter on the street when both run out on the school dance.

- Genie Chuo as Zhu Yi Xuan

Zhao Zhi Jie's childhood friend. She's a famous pianist. She has a crush on Zhi Jie since they were young because Zhi Jie was always nice to her. She comes back to Taiwan intending to marry Zhi Jie.

- Ye Min Zhi 葉民志 as Ji Yun Hao's father

Ji Yun Hao's father. He does not approve of Pang De Feng being in his daughter's life because he thinks De Feng is dumb and not good enough for his daughter. He is assumed to be a Triad Boss but his occupation in not mentioned.

- Lin Mei Hsiu 林美秀 as Xia Nian Qiao's mother

Xia Nian Qiao's mother. She is unhappy with the experimental class because she does not see improvement with Nian Qiao's grades. Also she does not approve of Nian Qiao and Zhi Jie's budding relation so she decides to send Nian Qiao to study aboard.

- Mile Liu Ming Feng 劉明峰 as Shao Zhong Xiang

The new male student of the class. All the boys think he is a triad member because he gets into constant fights outside of school but it's really because he is protecting his sick mother from loan sharks his father owes money to.

- Afalean Lu 盧學叡 as Lu Ming Rui

Liang Pei Jun's ex-boyfriend. He broke up with Pei Jun while he was studying in Japan and on her birthday. Later on he comes back Taiwan wanting to resume their relationship.

== Soundtrack ==
- SHA LA LA by EaStyle 翼勢力
- Donut 甜甜圈 by Albee Huang 小薰 and Ah Ben 阿本
- Lovelorn Waltz 失戀圓舞曲 by EaStyle 翼勢力
- 18 Love Not Love 十八愛不愛 by EaStyle 翼勢力

== Controversies ==
- Original episode 4 which was shown on the previews at the end of episode 3 was never aired due to the sensitive story plotline concerning kidnapping and murder of students. The network did not think it was appropriate to air the original episode 4 due to its age target audiences.
- Netizens had complained about the storyline for episode 6 during its original airing, as a complete ripoff of the Japanese anime "Death Note". Netizens had even asked for legal actions against "The Teen Age" on account of plagiarism.
- Albee Huang's character "Xia Nian Qiao" was written out of the additional added five episodes of the drama (episodes 17 - 20), due to scheduling conflicts. She was scheduled to film "Brown Sugar Macchiato" after the intended original 15 episodes of "The Teen Age" ended and could not continue participating in the drama. Her character "Xia Nian Qiao" was written out and replaced with Party Huang's character "Cao Mei" as the fourth girl in the group. Albee Huang reprises her character with a small cameo appearance at the end of the drama to close the storyline.
- at episode 20 ( Final episodes ) their stories was graduated at school and make a recorded to resume their each love stories. (This is special episode).

== Production credits ==
- Director:
  - Ming Chin-cheng
  - Ke Han Chen 柯翰辰
  - Zhou Jie Ru 周介如
- Producer:
  - Ke Yi-qín 柯以勤
  - Hu Níng Yuan 胡寧遠
- Production company: Duo Man Ni Ltd. 多曼尼 Ltd

== Broadcast ==
Channel	Country/Location	Airing Date	Timeslot	Notes
CTS	Taiwan	April 29, 2007	Sundays 22:00	
GTV	Taiwan	May 5, 2007	Saturdays 21:00	

== Episode ratings ==
"The Teen Age" received solid ratings throughout its original airing. It came in mostly 2nd or 3rd in its timeslot with a total average rating of 1.94.

Competing dramas on rival channels airing at the same time slot were:
- TTV - My Lucky Star, Ying Ye 3 Jia 1
- CTS - Summer x Summer, Why Why Love
- FTV - Brown Sugar Macchiato

Episode	Air Date	Average Ratings	Ranking
1	April 29, 2007	1.97	2
2	May 6, 2007	1.72	2
3	May 13, 2007	2.13	2
4	May 20, 2007	1.95	2
5	May 27, 2007	1.26	2
6	June 3, 2007	1.95	3
7	June 10, 2007	1.91	3
8	June 17, 2007	2.00	3
9	June 24, 2007	2.36	3
10	July 1, 2007	2.21	3
11	July 8, 2007	1.83	3
12	July 15, 2007	1.98	3
13	July 22, 2007	1.78	3
14	July 29, 2007	1.71	3
15	August 5, 2007	1.66	3
16	August 12, 2007	1.86	3
17	August 19, 2007	2.18	3
18	August 26, 2007	1.68	4
19	September 2, 2007	1.22	4
20	September 9, 2007	1.52	3
Average ratings		1.94	
