= Figaro Tseng =

Taiwanese actor, singer and art painter

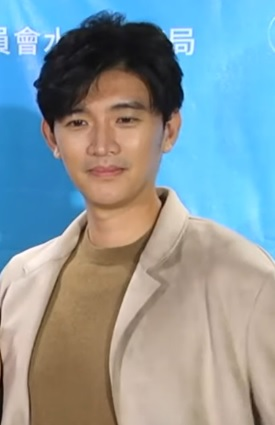
- Tseng in November 2020
- Born: 18 November 1981 (age 43); Kaohsiung, Taiwan
- Other names: Tseng Shi-yu (曾世宇)
- Occupation(s): Actor, singer, host, art painter
- Years active: 2001–present

Chinese name
- Chinese: 曾少宗
- Hanyu Pinyin: Zéng Shǎo Zōng
- Musical career
- Formerly of: Comic Boyz (2002–2005)

Figaro Tseng (Chinese: 曾少宗; pinyin: Zéng Shǎo Zōng; born 18 November 1981) is a Taiwanese actor, singer and art painter. He was part of Taiwanese boy band Comic Boyz from 2002 to 2005. They released three albums: Hey Hah!! Comic Boyz (2002); Youth Memoir (2003); Goodbye (New + Best Selection) (2005). He has also acted in Taiwanese dramas and hosted television shows.

== Early life ==
On 18 November 1981, Tseng was born in Zihguan District, Kaohsiung City. He has a younger brother.

When he was in the kindergarten, he suffered a severe accident. As a result, he is totally deaf in his right ear.

== Career ==
He was part of Taiwanese boy band Comic Boyz from 2002 to 2005. They released three albums: Hey Hah!! Comic Boyz (2002); Youth Memoir (2003); Goodbye (New + Best Selection) (2005). They disbanded in 2005.

Tseng later became a solo actor, host and painter.

== Filmography ==
=== Television series ===
Year	English title	Original title	Role	Notes
2001	Love Scar	烈愛傷痕		Guest star
2002	Serectly Loving You	偷偷愛上妳		Guest star
2002	Spicy Hot Students	麻辣高校生		Guest star
2003	Meteor Garden II	流星花園II		Guest star
2003	Crystal Boys 孽子		Guest star	
2004	Starry Night	愛在星光燦爛時	Shao-zong	
2005	KO One	終極一班	Tseng Shao-zong	
2005		愛戀米 (aka 愛神奔馳, 極速傳說2)	Hsu Zhong-xu	
2005	Devil Beside You	惡魔在身邊	Ah-rang	
2007	They Kiss Again	惡作劇2吻	Qi Tai	
2008	Mysterious Incredible Terminator	霹靂MIT	He Rui-jia / Hei Gui	
2008		緣之燴	Tao Xi	
2009	Autumn's Concerto	下一站，幸福	Jacko	
2009	I Do?	幸福的抉擇		
2010	Zhong Wu Yen	鍾無艷	Wu Da-wei	
2011	Dropping By Cloud Nine	你們我們他們	Li Li-jun	
2012	Love in the Wind	你是春風我是雨		
2012	Dong-Huachun Barbershop			
2019	Kawaii International	卡哇伊国际		Guest star
2020	Tokyo Love Story			Guest star
2021	More Than Blue: The Series	比悲傷更悲傷的故事 (影集版)	Yang Yu-hsien	

=== Film ===
- Oh, Pretty Woman (2018)
- Undercover Carp (2019)
- Kowloon Generic Romance (2025), Yulong

=== Music video appearances ===
- "知道" (I Know) – A-mei
- "求救專線" (Hotline For Help) from Make A Wish – Vic Chou
- "C大調" (C Major) from Flower in the Wonderland – Angela Chang

== Discography ==
=== Comic Boyz albums ===
Album #	Album info	Track listing
1st	Hey Hah!! Comic Boyz: Released: 25 November 2002; Label: Sony Music Taiwan; Language: Mandarin; Format: Studio album (CD); Genre: Mandopop	1. "Hey!Hah!"; 2. "求愛復刻版" (Old School Love); 3. "超人心" (The Heart Of Superman); 4. "最重要的你" (The Most Important You); 5. "我忍住哭" (I Hold on My Tears); 6. "喜歡你" (Loving U); 7. "Blue Miracle"; 8. "Buddy"; 9. "相信" (Belief); 10. "青春無敵" (Forever Youth); 11. "Hey! Hah!" (Asia remix); 12. "Hey! Hah!" (Euro remix)
2nd	Youth Souvenir Book (青春紀念冊): Released: 29 December 2003; Label: Sony Music Taiwan; Language: Mandarin; Format: Studio album (CD); Genre: Mandopop	1. "Number 2"; 2. "青春紀念冊" (Youth Souvenir Book); 3. "紅蜻蜓" (Red Dragon Fly); 4. "花季" (Flower Season); 5. "他" (Him); 6. "Hold Me Close"; 7. "我討厭" (I Hate It); 8. "我的野蠻女友" (My Sassy Girlfriend); 9. "愛的入場卷" (Love Coupon); 10. "愛像什麼" (Love What)
3rd	Goodbye Comic Boyz (New + Best Selection) (Goodbye 可米小子 新歌+精選): Released: 21 January 2005; Label: Sony Music Taiwan; Language: Mandarin; Format: Studio album (CD); Genre: Mandopop	1. "愛情不用翻譯" – Starry Night (愛在星光燦爛時) ending theme (new); 2. "好奇無上限" – Starry Night (愛在星光燦爛時) opening theme (new); 3. "Hey!Hah!"; 4. "求愛復刻版" (Old School Love); 5. "紅蜻蜓" (Red Dragon Fly); 6. "我忍住哭" (I Hold on My Tears); 7. "花季" (Flower Season); 8. "超人心" (The Heart Of Superman); 9. "Number 2"; 10. "Hold Me Close"; 11. "青春無敵" (Forever Youth); 12. "喜歡你" (Loving U); 13. "我的野蠻女友" (My Sassy Girlfriend); 14. "青春紀念冊" (Youth Souvenir Book)

== Awards and nominations ==
Year	Award	Category	Nominated work	Result
2015	50th Golden Bell Awards	Best Art and Design for a Drama Series	Maidenology	Nominated
2022	57th Golden Bell Awards	Best Supporting Actor in a Miniseries or Television Film	More Than Blue: The Series	Nominated

== See also ==
- Taiwanese art
