= Over the Rainbow (Angela Zhang album) =

2004 studio album by Angela Chang

- Regular edition cover

Studio album by Angela Zhang
- Released: January 6, 2004
- Genre: Mandopop
- Language: Mandarin
- Label: Linfair Records

Angela Zhang chronology
Over the Rainbow (2004)	Aurora (2004)

Alternative cover
- Dreams Come True edition cover

Over the Rainbow is the debut Mandarin solo studio album by Taiwanese–Canadian singer Angela Zhang. It was released by Linfair Records on January 6, 2004. A second edition, Over The Rainbow (Dreams Come True Edition) was released on April 7, 2004, with a bonus VCD containing five music videos.

== Track listing ==
1. "Over the Rainbow"
2. "寓言" (Fable)
3. "都只因為你" (Only Because of You)
4. "我的最愛" (My Favorite)
5. "天邊" (Horizon)
6. "聽見月光" (Heard Moonlight)
7. "吶喊" (Shout)
8. "雨后" (After the Rain)
9. "明明愛你" (Love You Obviously)
10. "真愛冒險" (Adventure of True Love)
11. "遺失的美好" (My Lost Happiness)
12. "Journey"

== Bonus VCD ==
Over The Rainbow (Dreams Come True Edition)

1. "寓言" (Fable) MV
2. "我的最愛" (My Favorite) MV
3. "天邊" (Horizon) MV
4. "吶喊" (Shout) MV
5. "雨后" (After the Rain) MV
