= Visible Wings =

- Regular edition cover

Studio album by Angela Zhang
- Released: October 12, 2012
- Genres: Pop; dance-pop; electropop; R&B
- Length: 43:28
- Language: Mandarin
- Label: Wonderful Music

Angela Zhang chronology
| The 5th Season (2009) | Visible Wings (2012) | Angela Zhang (2014) |

Alternative cover
- Pre-order cover

Professional ratings
Review scores
| Source | Rating |
|---|---|
| xinMSN Entertainment | 3.5/5 stars |

Visible Wings (Chinese: 有形的翅膀; pinyin: Yǒu Xíng De Chì Bǎng) is the seventh album by Taiwanese–Canadian singer Angela Zhang. It is the first album released under her new label Wonderful Music, released on October 12, 2012, in three formats: CD only, CD+DVD (with a poster) and a Preorder version (with a 2013 calendar).

== Track listing ==
CD
| No. | Title | Lyrics | Music | Length |
|---|---|---|---|---|
| 1. | "That Girl" | Wu Yi Wei | Hermanni Kovalainen, Milos Rosas, Petri Matara | 3:35 |
| 2. | "Lin Yu Yi Zhi Zou (淋雨一直走; Walking Through the Rain)" | Daryl Yao | Hermanni Kovalainen, Ilanguaq Lumholt, Henrik Tala | 3:24 |
| 3. | "Zui Jin Hao Ma (最近好嗎?; How Have You Been?)" | Greeny Wu | Lu Zhijie | 4:11 |
| 4. | "You Xing De Chi Bang (有形的翅膀; Visible Wings)" | Greeny Wu | Greeny Wu | 3:36 |
| 5. | "Wo Mei Gai Bian (我沒改變; I Did not Change)" | Wu Yi Wei | Ah Qin | 4:44 |
| 6. | "Jiang Bu Ting (講不聽; Can't Listen)" | Lin Wei | Yang Ha Song, Ji Sang Yoo | 3:48 |
| 7. | "Honesty" | Billy Joel | Billy Joel | 4:45 |
| 8. | "If I'm the one for you" | Kenn Wu, Wu Yi Wei | Kenn Wu | 3:49 |
| 9. | "Wang Zi Bing (王子病; Prince Disease)" | Wu Yi Wei | Hermanni Kovalainen, Milos Rosas, Henrik Tala, Petri Matara | 3:42 |
| 10. | "Xiong Di Jie Mei (兄弟姐妹; Brothers and Sisters)" | Francis Lee | Zhu Jing Ran | 3:21 |
| 11. | "Shi Wo (是我; It's Me)" | Francis Lee | Fukuda Takashi, Xiao Ren Huang | 4:33 |
| Total length: | | | | 43:28 |

DVD
| No. | Title | Length |
|---|---|---|
| 1. | "That Girl (Behind The Scenes)" |
| 2. | "That Girl (Music Video)" |

== Charts ==
=== Weekly charts ===
| Chart | Peak position |
|---|---|
| Taiwanese Albums (G-Music) | 5 |

== Release history ==
| Country | Date | Format | Label |
|---|---|---|---|
| Taiwan | October 12, 2012 | CD, CD+DVD, Preorder Version | Wonderful Music |
| Taiwan | November 30, 2012 | Digital Download | Wonderful Music |
| China | December 7, 2012 | CD, CD+DVD | Guang Dong Yin Xiang |
