= The 5th Season =

Studio album by Angela Chang
- Released: September 25, 2009
- Genre: Mandopop
- Language: Mandarin
- Label: Linfair Records

Angela Chang chronology
Ang 5.0 (2007)	The 5th Season (2009)	Visible Wings (2012)

The 5th Season (Chinese: 第5季) is the sixth Mandarin studio album by Taiwanese–Canadian singer Angela Zhang. It was released by Linfair Records on September 25, 2009.

The title track "白白的" (White) is listed at number 66 on Hit Fm Taiwan's Hit Fm Annual Top 100 Singles Chart (Hit-Fm年度百首單曲) for 2009.

== Track listing ==
No.	Title	Lyrics	Music	Length
1.	"The 5th Season" (第5季)	陳克華, 綠一字	陳偉	4:14
2.	"White" (白白的)	Francis Lee	陳偉	4:20
3.	"See the Farthest Place" (看得最遠的地方)	姚若龍	陳小霞	4:07
4.	"Lucky Kiss" (幸運之吻)	王雅君, 黃文萱, 陳偉	陳偉	3:26
5.	"Swinging Head" (搖擺頭)	陳偉, 陳太太	陳偉	3:46
6.	"Occasionally" (偶爾)	王雅君	王雅君	4:41
7.	"I Want Yours" (我要你的)	黃文萱	陳偉	4:54
8.	"Finding Amélie" (尋找愛蜜莉)	王雅君	戴蕙心	3:35
9.	"Get Happier More" (再快樂一點)	姚若龍	陳偉	4:18
10.	"I Started a Joke"	The Bee Gees	The Bee Gees	3:00

== Charts ==
=== Weekly charts ===
Chart (2009)	Peak position
Taiwanese Albums (G-Music)	2
