= Tien Chong =

Hong Kong singer and song writer

Tien Chong 張天
- Born: 25 September 1994 (age 31); United Kingdom
- Occupation: Singer-songwriter
- Years active: 2017–present
- Musical career
- Genres: Jazz
- Instrument: Vocals
- Labels: Mofo Music Ltd; HeySong Corporation

Tien Chong (simplified Chinese: 张天; traditional Chinese: 張天; pinyin: Zhāng Tiān; born September 25, 1994) is a Hong Kong singer-songwriter who made her debut in 2017. She was one of the seven first-round competitors in Singer 2018 where she was eliminated in week five. Tien is a contralto.

== Early life ==
On September 25, 1994, Chong was born in the United Kingdom to a Singaporean law student and a British nurse.

== Career ==
Chong has lived in Singapore, United Kingdom, Thailand and Hong Kong, however, She currently lives in Hong Kong pursuing her music career.

=== Career beginning: 2014–2017 ===
Chong signed to MoFo Music in 2014 and is managed by director/producer Kelvin Avon.

Chong was the voice for the HTC One M9 international campaign. She had co-written with the UK-based producer/DJ SanXero, New York writer Curtis Richa, and has supported Hong Kong artist/producer Jun Kung for his 'Alive On Stage' performance at McPherson Stadium.

In July 2015, she was invited to a songwriting camp in London's iconic Abbey Road Studios where she wrote and composed songs with well-known songwriters.

On August 19–20, 2016, she flew to Cuba to perform as an invited guest to Cuban Fusion Flamenco guitarist Reynier Marino at the National Theatre of Cuba for two nights as part of the 90th birthday celebrations of Fidel Castro.

Chong also starred in the DBS Bank-sponsored series Sparks, which premiered in mid-March 2017, and she sang the theme song for the online ad campaign. Since then, she has performed at the Atlas Bar opening in Singapore, Daybreaker in Hong Kong, and many more.

=== Singer 2018 and TIEN: 2018–present ===
Under Mofo Music, Chong released her first single, "Breathless", where her debut album was pending to be released.

Chong debuted as the first-week contestant on Singer 2018. Following the premiere episode (where she placed 2nd), she was recognized as a "dark horse" by the Chinese media, and her participation led to a rise in numbers of followers on her Weibo account from around 100 fans to around 16,000 fans.

Chong remained in the competition for four more weeks until her elimination on week five. She later returned to the competition on the sixth week for a return performance, and another on the 12th week, the Breakouts, with the latter performance failing to qualify for the finale.

=== Details ===
Round	Ep.	Broadcast Date	Song	Original Singer	Rank	Percentages of Votes	Note
1	1	12 Jan 2018	《Queen Bee》Suite		2	15.99%	
1	1	12 Jan 2018	Dancing Diva	Jolin Tsai	2	15.99%	
1	1	12 Jan 2018	Lady Marmalade	Labelle	2	15.99%	
1	2	19 Jan 2018	Shape of You	Ed Sheeran	8	4.19%	Tien was one of the arrangers
1	3	26 Jan 2018	Hello	Adele	5	10.21%	
2	4	2 Feb 2018	Me	Leslie Cheung	7	3.69%	
2	5	9 Feb 2018	One Day I'll Fly Away	Randy Crawford	8	3.01%	Eliminated
2	5	9 Feb 2018	I Don't Care	Tien Chong	8	3.01%	Eliminated
2	6	16 Feb 2018	Tightrope Walker	James Li	—N/a	—N/a	Return Performance
2	6	16 Feb 2018	Tightrope	Janelle Monáe	—N/a	—N/a	Return Performance
Breakout	12	6 April 2018	Rose, Rose, I Love You	Yao Lee	8	3.20%	Rap Lyrics are written by herself Eliminated

=== Overall Ranking and Percentage of Votes ===
Singer 2018 has four rounds of competition, and the overall ranking and percentage of votes was counted for every two shows, (the exception was on week three, due to the withdrawal of GAI.)

Round	Percentage of Votes of the first show (Ranking)	Percentage of Votes of the other show (Ranking)	Overall Percentage of Votes	Overall Ranking	Note
1	15.99% (2)	4.19% (8)	10.09%	6	
1	—N/a	10.21% (5)	10.21%	5	Challenge Round was counted alone after the withdrawal of contestant GAI.
2	3.69% (7)	3.93% (8)	3.81%	7	Eliminated

== Discography ==
=== Studio Album ===
#	Album Info	Tracklisting
1	TIEN: Released Date: June 8, 2018; Length: Genres: Pop; Funk; R&B; Blues; Motown; Soul; Rock; Go-go; Label: Mofo Music Ltd.	CD: 1. Funkistry; 2. Carousel (Promotional Song for Adrift); 3. Breathless; 4. Sinister; 5. 365 Days; 6. Start Me Up; 7. I Don't Care; 8. Work It Out; 9. I Understand; 10. Superstars

=== Singles ===
List of singles by TIEN Chong
Title	Released Date	Album	Ref.
Over Me: Label: MoFo Music Ltd	April 4, 2016	non-album single	
Superstars: Label: Soundcloud Demo	October 28, 2016	TIEN	
Blind I: Label: Soundcloud Demo	October 29, 2016	non-album single	
Breathless: Label: Mofo Music Ltd.	November 9, 2017	TIEN	
I Don't Care: Label: Mofo Music Ltd.	June 8, 2018	TIEN	
