= Flower in the Wonderland =

- Regular edition cover

Studio album by Angela Chang
- Released: January 12, 2007
- Genre: Mandopop
- Length: 41:03
- Language: Mandarin
- Label: Linfair Records

Angela Chang chronology
Pandora (2006)	Flower in the Wonderland (2007)	Ang 5.0 (2007)

Alternative cover
- CD+DVD and photo album cover

Flower in the Wonderland (Chinese: 夢裡花; lit. 'flowers in dream') is the fourth Mandarin studio album by Taiwanese–Canadian singer Angela Zhang. It was released on January 12, 2007, by Linfair Records. Two further editions were released, Flower in the Wonderland (Photobook Edition) (夢裡花 百變寫真版) on March 9, 2007, with a bonus DVD containing eight music videos and a 52-page photobook and Flower in the Wonderland (Concert Deluxe Edition) (夢裡花 百變演唱會豪華版) on March 19, 2007.

The music video for "C大調" (C Major) features Taiwanese artist Figaro Ceng, formerly of boy band Comic Boyz.

The track "不痛" (Doesn't Hurt) won Top 10 Gold Songs at the Hong Kong TVB8 Awards, presented by television station TVB8, in 2007.

== Track listing ==
1. "夢裡花" (Flower in the Wonderland)
2. "不痛" (Doesn't Hurt)
3. "C大調" (C Major)
4. "樣子" (Looking)
5. "幻想愛" (Love Imagines)
6. "給你給我" (Give You to Me)
7. "交換" (Exchange)
8. "其實很愛你" (I Really Love You)
9. "淚光" (Shine of Tears)
10. "愛上愛的味道" (Love the Taste of Love)
11. "尋寶" (Discovering Treasures)

== Bonus DVD ==
Flower in the Wonderland (DVD Edition)

1. "夢裡花" (Flower in the Wonderland) MV
2. "不痛" (Doesn't Hurt) MV
3. "C大調" (C Major) MV - feat Figaro Ceng
4. "樣子" (Looking) MV
5. "幻想愛" (Love Imagines) MV
6. "其實很愛你" (I Really Love You) MV
7. "愛上愛的味道" (Love the Taste of Love) MV
8. "尋寶" (Discovering Treasures) MV

== Charts ==
Chart (2007)	Peak position
Taiwanese Albums (G-Music)	3
