= Ang 5.0 =

- Regular edition cover

Studio album by Angela Zhang
- Released: December 14, 2007
- Genre: Mandopop
- Language: Mandarin
- Label: Linfair Records

Angela Zhang chronology
Flower in the Wonderland (2007)	Ang 5.0 (2007)	The 5th Season (2009)

Alternative cover
- Birthday Celebration edition cover

Ang 5.0 is the fifth Mandarin studio album by Taiwanese–Canadian singer Angela Zhang. It was released by Linfair Records on December 14, 2007. Two more editions were released, Ang 5.0 (Birthday Celebration Edition) (女神生日慶祝版) on January 18, 2008, with a bonus DVD containing six music videos and Ang 5.0 (Deluxe Behind-the-Scenes Edition) (女神華麗寫真影音版), on March 7, 2008, with a bonus DVD containing nine behind-the-scene footages

The track, "不想懂得" (Don't Want to Understand) won one of the Top 10 Songs of the Year at the 2009 HITO Radio Music Awards presented by Taiwanese radio station Hit FM.

== Composition ==
Musically, the album is composed of rock, ballad, and R&B-style songs. "I'm in Love" was described as a "fast song that combines super speed rock arrangement with super sweet singing". "Don't Want To Understand" was described to "express the reluctance and expectation of love". The track "Darling, That Isn't Love" was composed by Jay Chou and is a slow R&B-style song based on the theme of "older woman-younger man" relationships.

== Track listing ==
1. "我戀愛了" (I Am in Love)
2. "不想懂得" (Don't Want to Understand)
3. "親愛的, 那不是愛情" (Darling, That Isn't Love)
4. "床邊故事" (Bedside Story)
5. "頭號甜心" (No. 1 Sweetheart)
6. "重來" (Again)
7. "能不能勇敢說愛" (Can You Talk About Love Bravely)
8. "失億" (Amnesia)
9. "樂園" (Paradise)
10. "誰愛誰" (Who Loves Who)

== Bonus DVD ==
Ang 5.0 (Birthday Celebration Edition)

1. "我戀愛了" (I Am in Love) MV
2. "不想懂得" (Don't Want to Understand) MV
3. "親愛的, 那不是愛情" (Darling, That isn't Love) MV
4. "頭號甜心" (No. 1 Sweetheart) MV
5. "床邊故事" (Bedside Story) MV
6. "能不能勇敢說愛" (Can You Talk About Love Bravely) MV

Ang 5.0 (Deluxe Behind-the-Scenes Edition)

1. Angela styling behind-the-scene
2. Angela gundam practise
3. Ang 5.0 album photoshoot
4. "我戀愛了" (I Am in Love) MV behind-the-scene
5. "不想懂得" (Don't Want to Understand) MV behind-the-scene
6. "親愛的, 那不是愛情" (Darling, That isn't Love) MV behind-the-scene
7. "床邊故事" (Bedside Story) MV behind-the-scene
8. "能不能勇敢說愛" (Can You Talk About Love Bravely) MV behind-the-scene
9. Ang 5.0 (Birthday Celebration Edition) photoshoot

== Charts ==
Chart (2007)	Peak position
Taiwanese Albums (G-Music)	1
