= Aurora (Angela Zhang album) =

- Regular edition cover

Studio album by Angela Chang
- Released: December 1, 2004
- Genre: Mandopop
- Language: Mandarin
- Label: Linfair Records

Angela Chang chronology
| Over The Rainbow (2004) | Aurora (2004) | Pandora (2006) |

Alternative cover
- CD+DVD cover

Aurora (Chinese: 歐若拉) is the second Mandarin studio album by Taiwanese–Canadian singer Angela Zhang. It was released by Linfair Records December 1, 2004. A second edition, Aurora (DVD Edition) was released January 28, 2005, with a bonus DVD containing music videos.

The album features a duet and music video, "快樂崇拜" (Adoration to Happiness) with Taiwanese singer and rapper Will Pan, which was also released in his third studio album Wu Ha under his label Universal Music Taiwan.

The track "Mama Mama" was nominated for Top 10 Gold Songs at the Hong Kong TVB8 Awards, presented by television station TVB8, in 2005. Chang was nominated for Best Mandarin Female Singer at the 16th Golden Melody Awards for her work on this album.

== Track listing ==
1. "Mama Mama"
2. "歐若拉" (Aurora)
3. "手心的太陽" (The Sun in the Palm of My Hand)
4. "浮雲" (Floating Clouds)
5. "直線" (Straight Line)
6. "起點" (Starting Point)
7. "复活节" (Easter)
8. "可以愛很久" (Able to Love for a Long Time)
9. "猜不透" (Can't Guess)
10. "靜不下來" (Nothing Keeps Me Calm)
11. "快樂崇拜" (Worship Happiness) - feat Will Pan

== DVD ==
1. "Mama Mama" MV
2. "歐若拉" (Aurora) MV
3. "手心的太陽" (The Sun in the Palm of My Hand) MV
4. "浮雲" (Floating Clouds) MV
5. "猜不透" (Can't Guess) MV
6. "靜不下來" (Nothing Keeps Me Calm) MV
7. "快樂崇拜" (Adoration to Happiness) - feat Will Pan MV
