= Tengger (singer) =

Chinese singer and songwriter (born 1960)

- Born: 15 January 1960 (age 66); Otog Banner, Inner Mongolia, China
- Other names: Tenger; Tengri
- Education: Tianjin Conservatory of Music
- Occupations: Singer-songwriter; actor
- Spouse: Hāsī Gāowá (m. 1987; div. 1995)
- Partner: Zhū Lā (Chinese: 珠拉)
- Children: daughter: 嘎吉尔, 2004–2010; son: 班迪, 2007 (age 18–19)

Chinese name
- Traditional Chinese: 騰格爾
- Simplified Chinese: 腾格尔
- Literal meaning: sky
Transcriptions
Standard Mandarin
- Hanyu Pinyin: Ténggé'ěr
- Wade–Giles: Teng Ko Erh

Mongolian name
- Mongolian Cyrillic: Тэнгэр
- Mongolian script: ᠲᠩᠷᠢ
- Musical career
- Genres: Pop; folk; rock
- Instruments: Vocals; Morin khuur
- Years active: 1979–present

Tengger (Mongolian: Тэнгэр, Mongolian: ᠲᠩᠷᠢ, lit. "sky"; simplified Chinese: 腾格尔; traditional Chinese: 騰格爾; pinyin: Ténggé'ěr; born 15 January 1960), also known as Tenger or Tengri, is a Chinese singer, songwriter and composer of Mongol descent from Inner Mongolia.

He is one of the most representative Mongol male singers, as his most famous works, including songs Mongol and Tiantang (Heaven), reflect the Mongolian culture, while he uses other elements later in his career, making his music a combination of various kinds of Chinese pop music.

== Personal life ==
=== Early life and education ===
Tengger was born in Otog Banner, Inner Mongolia in the Sainbayar family. Both of his parents were folk singers so he and his four other siblings all aspired to follow suit. Because of an incident in junior high school, he became uninterested in academics. In 1975, while uncertain about his future, he applied and was admitted to Art School of Inner Mongolia. There he briefly studied dance before switching to learning instruments. After graduating, he served as a teacher and conductor. In 1980, he joined College of Music in Tianjin, where he got formal training as a musician.

=== Family ===
Tengger met Hasi Gaowa in 1987 and they married in 1988. Because of conflicts over how Tengger spent his money, after seven years, they divorced in 1995. In 1997, he met Zhu La and they married in 2003. They had a daughter in 2004 who died after just six years because of a congenital disease in 2010.

== Career ==
=== Early Days (1986-2007) ===
Tengger came to prominence in 1986, when he performed his original song Mongol in a singing competition.

In 1992, Tengger became the first mainland artist to perform in Taiwan since 1949 as he held a solo concert in Taipei. During that 2-hour concert, Tengger performed 18 of his songs, and that number has been the highest of all his concerts. His songs with Mongolian style became so popular among his fans in Taiwan that he was still recognized by the fans 14 years later when he came for another concert in 2006.

Tengger built up a band Wild Wolf in 1993 with five of his friends who also came from Inner Mongolia.

Though having taken part in a band, Tengger kept writing new songs himself and later came up with a new personal album Chuzou (Running Away) in 1997. Among the songs in this album, Tiantang (Heaven) turned out to be a stand-out single, winning many awards in China and across the Globe.

Entering the 21st century, Tengger took part in numerous concerts and shows with his Mongolian style songs and symbolical voice. On September 14, 2001, Tengger went to the United States for his concert, in which he performed Tiantang to mourn the victims of the September 11 attacks. In 2002, he went back to Otog Banner, Inner Mongolia with Wild Wolf to hold a concert, which was their first in their hometown. In 2004, they went to Hong Kong, where they performed many of Tengger's popular original songs.

However, things went different in 2007, when his daughter was diagnosed with an incurable severe congenital disease. He soon left the public eye for some time to help his family.

=== The Low (2007-2013) ===
Tengger was in deep sorrow after the incident, and such sadness reached peak in 2010 when his daughter eventually did not pull through. Yet he did not give up his music completely during such hard time. In January 2010, he came up with a new album Yunzhongdeyueliang (The Moon in the Clouds), which included a remake edition of Tiantang, with Wild Wolf.

=== Revival (2013-Present) ===
After staying away from the public for a long time, Tengger made a comeback in 2013, with a brand-new original song Taohuayuan (Land of Peach Blossoms). In his new song, his style changed from the original traditional Mongolian music to modern pop.

Since then, Tengger has been trying new styles and cooperating with other singers. In 2017, he covered Yinxingdechibang (Invisible Wings), originally sang by female Taiwan singer Angela Chang, in a music show.

In 2018, he participated in I am a Singer, a music show on Hunan TV, where he ranked 4th among 14 participants. In the final showdown, he performed Sad Dream Behind the Curtain, an old Cantonese song that could date back to 1975.

In April 2021, Tengger cooperated with Mongolian writer Bao'erji Yuanye to publish a new song Xiamabaicaoyuan, in which he expressed his love and devotion to his hometown in Mongolian Grassland.

== Achievements ==
- A Mongolian Tale, the movie that Tengger starred in received the following awards: "Best Director, Best Artistic Contribution, Tengger's Music, Montreal World Film Festival; Best Director, Shanghai Film Critics Awards".
- 1991: Golden Phoenix Award.
- 19th Montreal International Film Festival: Best Music Award.
- China's First Golden Bell Award: Bronze Award for Vocal Works.

== Discography ==
=== Albums ===
- 八千里路雲和月 (1990)
- 蒙古 (1991)
- Surpass and New Heaven (2002)
- 梦 (2010)

== Filmography ==
Movie

- A Mongolian Tale (1995) as Bayinbulag
- Scheme With Me (2012) as Stone Buddha
- All You Need Is Love (2015)
- For a Few Bullets (2016) as Mongolian representative-agent
- Pegasus (2019) as KTV Boss (Geer Teng)
- The Winners (2020) as Yan Jin's father
- Super Family (2022)

TV Show

- Day Day Up (2008)
- Challenge League (2017)
- Singer 2018 (2018) as Contestant/himself/performer
- The Inn: Season 2 (2018)
- Master in the House (2019)
- Sound Waves Partners (2019)
- Dance Smash (2019)
- Liu Tang De Ge Sheng 2 (2020)
- 2060 (2021)
