= Romantic Princess =

- Promotion poster
- Also known as: 公主小妹; Gong Zhu Xiao Mei
- Genre: Romance, Comedy
- Based on: Four Steps to Romance by Kazuko Fujita
- Directed by: Lin He Long (林合隆)
- Starring: Angela Zhang; Wu Chun; Calvin Chen; George Hu; Eric Lee Ang Lin
- Opening theme: "新窩" (New Home) by Fahrenheit and S.H.E
- Ending theme: "不想懂得" (Don't Want to Understand) by Angela Zhang
- Country of origin: Republic of China (Taiwan)
- Original language: Mandarin
- No. of episodes: 13

Production
- Executive producer: Huang Wan Bo
- Running time: 90 mins (Sundays at 22:00)
- Production company: Comic Productions Co.

Original release
- Network: China Television (CTV)
- Release: 16 September – 9 December 2007

Related
- The Teen Age (18 禁不禁); They Kiss Again (惡作劇2吻)

Romantic Princess (Chinese: 公主小妹; pinyin: Gong Zhu Xiao Mei), previously known as, Wo Jia Gong Zhu (我家公主), is a 2007 Taiwanese drama starring Wu Chun and Calvin Chen of Fahrenheit, Angela Zhang and George Hu. It was based on the manga Four Steps to Romance (ろまんす五段活用, Romance Godan Katsuyou) by Kazuko Fujita. The drama was produced by Comic Productions (可米製作股份有限公司) and directed by Lin He Long (林合隆). It started filming on 4 May 2007.

The series was first broadcast in Taiwan on free-to-air China Television (CTV) (中視) from 16 September 2007 to 9 December 2007, every Sunday at 22:00 to 23:30 and cable TV Gala Television (GTV) Variety Show/CH 28 (八大綜合台) on 22 September 2007 to 15 December 2007, every Saturday at 21:30 to 23:00.

== Plot ==
Adopted by middle classed parents, Xiao Mai (Angela Zhang) has always had a dream to be an heiress. Finally, her dream becomes reality. Xiao Mai discovers that her biological grandfather, Huangfu Xiong (Emp) (Gu Bao Ming), is the head of a prestigious aristocratic family. After being kidnapped by their family's enemies and after many years of searching, he finally finds his long lost granddaughter.

As she starts her life as an heiress, every day is filled with excitement; however, everything seems a bit different from what she had imagined it to be. In the family, there are 4 candidates, one of whom will become the successor of Emp. One of those candidates is Nan Feng Jin (Wu Chun). At first, Nan Feng Jin dislikes Xiao Mai because he knows that he will be engaged to Xiao Mai and as a result, can never leave the Huangfu family and will be forced to be the successor of Emp.

Because Jin wants to be a normal salesperson, he tried his best to ignore his growing fondness for Xiao Mai, but love prevails. Initially, the two want to hide their relationship from Emp, because they fear that exposing their relationship will result in their engagement and Jin's establishment as Emp's successor.

Then one day, a new 'Huangfu Shan' appears that has the same birthmark and evidence that she is the real Huangfu Shan, such as a ring with her birthdate encrypted in it. Xiao Mai and Gong Mo Li, the 'real' Huangfu Shan, have the same interests and birthdates. As a result, Xiao Mai gets kicked out of the household and instead becomes a maid in the Huangfu house. She later discovers a plot invented by Gong Mo Li and Emp, where Gong Mo Li is pretending to be the 'Huangfu Shan' and in love with Jin. In reality, Gong Mo Li is in love with Cai and is merely an actress hired by Emp to make Xiao Mai and Jin confess their relationship such that they can become engaged.

Although the four try to confront Emp, he keeps hiding, with the help of Butler Yi. Soon the group eventually faces Emp and tells him that Xiao Mai doesn't want to be the heiress anymore and that neither Jin nor Cai doesn't want to be the successor. Emp becomes furious and lets them do what they want: "starting from scratch", and kicks them out of the house.

Jin, out in the real world, is unable to find work because of Emp's influence, however, he manages to find a job as a construction worker. Cai And Gong Mo Li, who were also kicked out of the Huangfu House, start selling their things to the pawnshop but end up spending their money on useless things. Eventually, Cai and Gong Mo Li give up and returned to the Huangfu House.

Over time Emp becomes ill and has to go under operation. He has kept his illness a secret, something that only Butler Yi knows about. Even though his condition is becoming worse, he still doesn't want to go under the knife. When Xiao Mai learned about his illness, she realizes that her grandfather's stubbornness could lead to his death. She confronts Butler Yi and tells him to get Emp to agree to surgery and that if he is angry, that he can blame her.

The operation is successful, but Emp remains unconscious following the procedure. If Emp does not wake up in the days following the operation, the co-owners of the Huangfu business will take over his company. Even though Xiao Mai is the heiress, the co-owners do not believe that women, and Xiao Mai in particular, are capable of running the company. But Xiao Mai tries her best and takes the same exams that were previously taken by Jin and the other 3 successors (Cai, Ying, and Lin) to prove her worth. Unfortunately, she fails her exams, but just as the co-owners are about to take control of the company, Emp awakens. He insists that Xiao Mai is to become his successor and as a result, Xiao Mai ends up being both heiress and successor. Jin, on the other hand, remains an office worker.

Following the announcement, Xiao Mai has to go to America for a 3-year long course to learn how to become the successor for Huang Fu Corp. Jin is waiting for his clients to sign his first big contract which he stayed up the night before working on. Emp and the Nan Feng boys (other than Jin) are at the airport sending Xiao Mai off. As the time to leave nears, it appears that Jin will not make it to the terminal before Xiao Mai is to leave. However, just as Xiao Mai is walking towards her gate, Jin finally appears and calls out her name. She smiles and turns to him. Jin runs towards her and they share a kiss.

== Cast ==
The names used in the Philippines are in the parentheses

- Angela Zhang as Mai Qiusui/Huangfu Shan/Xiao Mai 麥秋穗 (Janna Mai/Cheryl Huangfu)
- Wu Chun as Nanfeng Jin 南風瑾 (Jin Nanfeng)
- Ku Pao-ming as Huangfu Xiong 皇甫雄 (John Huangfu)
- Calvin Chen as Nanfeng Cai 南風彩 (Ralph Nanfeng)
- George Hu as Nanfeng Lin 南風璘 (Lin Nanfeng)
- Eric Lee Ang Lin as Nanfeng Ying 南風影 (Ying Nanfeng)
- Genie Chuo as Gong Moli 宮茱莉 (Mickie Gong)
- Bu Xue Liang as Mai Congguang 麥聰光
- Huang Jia Qian as Maige Haowa 麥戈浩娃
- Hsia Ching Ting as Yi Senchuan 伊森川 (Butler Yi)

== Music ==
- Opening theme song: "新窩" (Xin Wo) [New Home] by Fahrenheit and S.H.E
- Ending theme song: "不想懂得" (Bu Xiang Dong De) [Don't Want to Understand] by Angela Zhang

Insert songs

- "我戀愛了" [I'm In Love] (formerly "我的" [Mine]) by Angela Zhang
- "能不能勇敢說愛" [Can Bravely Say Love?] by Angela Zhang
- "樂園" [Garden] by Angela Zhang
- "Over the Rainbow" by Angela Zhang

== International broadcasting ==
- The show was broadcast in Indonesia, starting on November 11, 2007, on RCTI Astro Mandarin
- The series premiered on June 2, 2008, in the Philippines on ABS-CBN as the replacement for Hana Kimi. It has had a successful run since then. Angela Zhang's character was replaced by a new name, Janna.
- In Thailand first aired on July 11, 2009, on Channel 3.
- In Vietnam first aired on HTV2 on May 5, 2008, as Công chúa đáng yêu.

== Episode ratings ==
| Date | Episode | Ratings |
|---|---|---|
| 2007-09-17 | ep. 1 | 3.33 |
| 2007-09-23 | ep. 2 | 3.72 |
| 2007-09-30 | ep. 3 | 3.13 |
| 2007-10-07 | ep. 4 | 3.28 |
| 2007-10-14 | ep. 5 | 3.21 |
| 2007-10-21 | ep. 6 | 3.24 |
| 2007-10-28 | ep. 7 | 3.32 |
| 2007-11-04 | ep. 8 | 3.56 |
| 2007-11-11 | ep. 9 | 3.81 |
| 2007-11-18 | ep. 10 | 3.51 |
| 2007-11-25 | ep. 11 | 3.45 |
| 2007-12-02 | ep. 12 | 3.15 |
| 2007-12-09 | ep. 13 | 3.55 |
| Average | | 3.40 |

Source: Showbiz Chinatimes
