= Shone An =

Taiwanese singer, actor and television host

- 安鈞璨
- Born: 黃益承; 20 September 1983; East District, Tainan, Taiwan
- Died: 1 June 2015 (aged 31); Tainan, Taiwan
- Education: Fu Jen Catholic University
- Occupations: Singer, actor, television host
- Years active: 2001–2015
- Known for: Comic Boyz
- Parent(s): 黃秋榮 (father) 楊美蓮 (mother)

Shone An (Chinese: 安鈞璨; pinyin: Ān Jūncàn; 20 September 1983 – 1 June 2015) was a Taiwanese singer, actor and television host.

== Early life ==
On 20 September 1983, An was born in East District, Tainan. He was the only child in his family. His birth name was Huang Yi-cheng (黃益承). During his childhood, he was primarily raised by his grandparents.

His father is a businessman and politician.

An graduated from Fu Jen Catholic University with a degree in philosophy.

== Career ==
From 2001 to 2005, he was a member of the mandopop boy band Comic Boyz. He also appeared in many movie, television and theatre productions such as Case Sensitive (2011), Rhapsody of Marriage (2012) and Turn Around (2014). He was also a guest host on 100% Entertainment.

Shone was close friends with Ady An and Joe Chen.

== Death ==
On 1 June 2015, Shone An died of liver cancer at home, in Tainan, aged 31. His funeral was held a week later on 8 June 2015 and attended by fellow Comic Boyz members Kingone Wang and Peter Chang.
