= Bump Off Lover =

- Promotional poster
- Also known as: 愛殺17; Ai Sha 17
- Genre: School, Thriller, Suspense, Romance, Mystery, Tragedy, Slice of Life
- Starring: Angela Zhang; Lu Ting Wei; Julian Yang Shi Xuan; Zhang Shan Jie
- Opening theme: "口袋的天空" (Sky in the Pocket) by Angela Zhang
- Ending theme: "隐形的翅膀" (Invisible Wings) by Angela Zhang
- Country of origin: Taiwan
- Original language: Mandarin
- No. of episodes: 14

Production
- Running time: approximately 60-80 Minutes to each episodes

Original release
- Network: China Television (CTV)
- Release: 19 February – 14 May 2006

Related
- It Started with a Kiss; Silence

Bump Off Lover (traditional Chinese: 愛殺17; simplified Chinese: 爱杀17; pinyin: Ai Sha 17; lit. 'love kill 17') is a 2006 Taiwanese television series starring Angela Zhang.

It was broadcast on free-to-air China Television (CTV) (中視) from 19 February 2006 to 14 May 2006, every Sunday at 22:00 and cable TV Gala Television (GTV) Variety Show/CH 28 (八大綜合台) on 25 February 2006 to 20 May 2006, every Saturday at 21:30 to 23:00.

The drama was nominated in 7 categories for the 41st Golden Bell Awards, winning 3: Best Writing for a Television Series, Best Supporting Actress (Shen Shi Hua) and Best Sound. Angela Zhang was nominated for Best Actress for her role as Xu Yi Zhen/Xu Yi Jing. Other nominations include Best Film Editing, Best Lighting and Best Television Series.

== Synopsis ==
She was only 17 years old when she was brutally murdered. And, a trial by media led her suspected killer to commit suicide. Now, her older sister wants to find out the truth, but it maybe uglier and deadlier than anyone can handle.

== Cast ==
- Xu Yi Zhen 徐宜真/Xu Yi Jing 徐宜静/Ah Cat 阿CAT (Angela Zhang)
- Zou Ke Qiang 鄒克強 (Lu Ting Wei)
- Lin Jia Wei 林嘉緯 (Julian Yang Shi Xuan)
- Liang Ya Jian 梁雅娟 (Shen Shi Hua)
- Xu Zhong Yuan 徐中原 (Yun Zhong Yue)
- Zou Ke Jie 鄒克傑 (Zhang Shan Jie)
- Yang Ren You 楊仁佑 (Matt Wu)
- Zhong Yu Wen 鐘語雯 (Zhang Yu Chen)
- You Mei Qin 游美琴 (Li Yong Xian)
- Sha Ye Jia 沙也迦 (Shi Jing Jing)
- Xie Ai Lin/Ah Sa 謝愛琳 (Zhong Xin Yi)
- Inspector Wang (Jag Huang)
- Xu Yi Zhen (childhood) (Chen Shi Ya)
- Xu Yi Jing (childhood) (Chen Shi Yuan)
- Sun Shao Long (Huang Xing Lun)
- Lin Fu (Lin Li Yang)

== Characters ==
- Xu Yi Zhen 徐宜真 (Angela Zhang)
- Child Xu Yi Zhen (Chen Shi Ya) (Episode 14 flashback in the ending)

The principal's elder 18-year-old twin daughter; Yi Zhen (recognised by her long hair) is the more extroverted sister and stands up for herself as well as her sister, taking injustice personally. Yi Zhen has a phobia of water which stems from her memories of her throwing her sister (and consequently falling in herself) into a swimming pool when they were 6. She hangs out after class with Jia Wei. She wants to appear perfect to everyone, but this is something only her sister knows.

The GTV website states: Xu Yi Zhen (older sister) described as: 17 years older, high school senior From outward appearance, I am perceived by others as smart, good personality, pretty, and cute, but not an ounce of arrogance. It's true, I am the perfect model that people envy and get jealous over, but I adore all the attention I get, and I love the fake self I have created for myself. To become number 1, I would stay up late to study and not care about my health. Yes, you can call me the "Queen of Fakeness" because I care about how people think of me. People's adorations and praises gives me the strength to live. The only person that knows about my fake outward appearance is my younger sister. But in private, I am lazy and obstinate. I am so unlike my younger sister, she is so gentle, sweet, and patient (I think it's probably due to her poor health). I have never seen her angry at anyone.

- Xu Yi Jing 徐宜靜 (Angela Zhang) (episode 1 & 2, Flashback)
- Child Xu Yi Jing (Chen Shi Yuan) (Episode 14 Flashback in the ending)

The principal's younger 18-year-old twin daughter; Yi Jing (recognised by her short hair) suffers from severe asthma and is always coddled by her mother and sister. She is more reserved and innocent and hangs out after class with another female student, shopping or eating. Due to her sickness she skipped a year of school. She never gets angry and appears to be compassionate and helpful.

The GTV website states:

Xu Yi Jing (younger sister): Compared to my sister, I should be considered as the extra one. It is fate that the day I am born as a twin, people will compare my sister and I with everything. Until I found out my sister's true self, it's true, I was jealous of her. So I've decided to play the role of the gentle, sweet, and cute sister to please my parents. Throughout all this time, YiZhen and I played our roles accordingly, neither of us ever thought about changing anything. But, since I have poor health, I was away from school for one year, during that time, I begin to change.

Many people are angry at the sisters for their apparent aloofness; no guys in the school stand a chance with them.

- Zou Ke Qiang 鄒克強 (Lu Ting Wei) (Episode 1–14)

Having graduated from high school, 21-year-old Ke Qiang makes a living selling unlicensed CDs on the Internet. He seems to run into Yi Zhen a lot and saves her life more than once. He used to terrorise people in high school and considers himself quite the Casanova. He has divorced parents and his father is in jail for drugs, thus he often plays the father figure to his little brother, Ke Jie. He gradually falls in love with Yi Zhen as they investigate the truth behind her twin sister's death.

- Lin Jia Wei 林嘉緯 (Julian Yang Shi Xuan) (Episode 1 -14)

A friend of the family's; 18-year-old Jia Wei is Yi Zhen's best friend from childhood and later boyfriend, who Yi Jing also has a crush on. He is the all rounded 'nice guy' and class president, always helping his underclassmen and listening to his mother, who is a TV presenter. He later passionately investigates the murder, longing to protect Yi Zhen.

- Liang Ya Jian 梁雅娟 (Shen Shi Hua) (Episode 1–14)

The twins' mother; 43-year-old principal of the school.

- Xu Zhong Yuan 徐中原 (Yun Zhong Yue)

The twins' father; 47-year-old Zhong Xuan is a notable builder and pressured by his wife, constructed the new building for the school.

- Zou Ke Jie 鄒克傑 (Zhang Shan Jie) (Episode 1–4)

Ke Qiang's 17-year-old younger brother and in the same class as Yi Jing, he is weak and bullied by the others in his school. He is not academically intelligent and has been withdrawn from many schools, to the consternation of his elder brother.

- Yang Ren You 楊仁佑 (Matt Wu) (Episode 1–8)

Previously a science teacher at the school, 32-year-old Ren You was fired when he was caught by students attempting to sexually harass Yi Zhen.

- Zhong Yu Wen 鐘語雯 (Zhang Yu Chen)

Currently the English teacher at the school, 25-year-old Yu Wen used to have an intimate relationship with Ren You.

- You Mei Qin 游美琴 (Li Yong Xian)

Jia Wei's mother and 45-year-old famous news presenter; her husband died when Jia Wei was little – he was Zhong Xuan's business partner.

- Sa Ye Jia / Sasa 沙也迦 (Shi Jing Jing)

Ke Qiang's friend and business partner, 21-year-old Ye Jia is secretly in love with Ke Qiang but can't bring herself to tell him.

- Xie Ai Ling 謝愛琳 (Zhong Xin Yi)

17-year-old Ai Ling is Yi Jing's best friend and seatmate.

- Sun Sao Long (Huang Xing Lun) (Episode 1–2, often flashback)

The class bully, his first screen time is when he beats and humiliates Ke Jie for trying to 'get' Yi Jing when no one else can.

- Lin Fu (Lin Li Yang)
- Inspector Wang (Jag Huang)

== Quotes ==
- "They say that if you have been kissed by an angel, you will have a pair of invisible wings. In times of fear, those wings of yours will spread open and will bring your own heaven" (Yi Jing to Ke Jie)
- "I once said 99 true words, no one believed me. I once said a single lie, everyone believed me. From then on, I realized that we are living a life full of lies." (Yi Jing to herself)
- Love and betrayal co-exist. It doesn't mean that if you betrayed the one you love, you love him less. Nor does it mean that if you love someone, you will not betray him..." (Yi Jing to herself)"
- "Envy and admiration are the same. It's just that people believe that admiration sounds less evil…" (Yi Jing to herself while talking with Ah Sa)
- "I spent my life destroying other people's lives, little did I know that I destroyed my own life as well..." (Yi Jing to herself)
- "Look who's talking now! Am I the one who is freaky, or is it you, you who betrayed Father?" (Jia Wei to his mom)
- "You thought I was young and innocent, but I absorbed every word you said. But you did not notice, for like you, I was good at pretending... it was you who taught me to be that way!" (Yi Jing to the principal)
- "I only save those who are worth saving!" (Jia Wei to Yi Jing)
- "Forgive my being unfair, but I chose to spend your 18th birthday with Yi Jing" (The Principal to Yi Zhen)
- "Yi Jing's mouth, Yi Zhen's finger, Yi Jing's Flute, Yi Zhen's CD, Yi Jing's gentleness, Yi Zhen's smile, Yi Jing's wig, Yi Zhen's mirror, Yi Jing's envy, Yi Zhen's anger, Yi Jing's asthma, Yi Zhen's fear of water, Yi Jing's blood, Yi Zhen's tears, Yi Jing's diary, our 17 years...

== Awards and nominations ==
Year	Ceremony	Category	Result
2006	41st Golden Bell Awards	Best Television Series	Nominated
2006	41st Golden Bell Awards	Best Actress (Angela Zhang)	Nominated
2006	41st Golden Bell Awards	Best Supporting Actress (Shen Shi Hua)	Won
2006	41st Golden Bell Awards	Best Writing for a Television Series (Chen Shih-chieh, Xieshu Fang, Chen Hui Zhen)	Won
2006	41st Golden Bell Awards	Best Sound	Won
2006	41st Golden Bell Awards	Best Film Editing	Nominated
2006	41st Golden Bell Awards	Best Lighting	Nominated
