= Comic Boyz =

Taiwanese boy band

- Born: Taiwan
- Occupation(s): Singers, actors
- Years active: 2001–2005
- Musical career
- Origin: Taiwan
- Genres: Mandopop
- Labels: Sony Music Taiwan
- Past members: Kingone Wang (王传一); Figaro Tseng (曾少宗); Peter Chang (张庭伟); Shone An (安钧璨)^{†}; Arroy Shen (申东靖)^{†}; Eddie Hsu

Comic Boyz (Chinese: 可米小子) was a Taiwanese vocal quintet boy band, composed of Kingone Wang, Figaro Tseng, Peter Chang, Shone An, Arroy Shen and Eddie Hsu. Despite the publicity and making appearance in Taiwanese dramas, Comic Boyz was not as successful as expected, especially since they kept being compared to their predecessor, F4. They disbanded in 2005 after the release of their farewell album Goodbye Comic Boyz.

== History ==
=== 2001: Band formation ===
In 2001, after the success of F4, Comic Ritz Production was looking to create a new group to fulfill the 'boy band craze' in Taiwan. The first selection left them with 11 potential candidates for the group. The 11 young men underwent training and part of the training was to host TV shows. After six months of training, they were evaluated based on their performance. Five members were eliminated and the remaining six formed the official group. The six men were Kingone Wang, Figaro Tseng, Shone An, Arroy Shen, Peter Chang, and Eddie Hsu.

In 2002, right after their first album was released, Hsu slipped and fell on the floor while practicing a dance routine. He suffered several bone fractures that would require 3–4 months of absence to recover. After consideration, Hsu decided to leave the group and focus on school work. Since he used to be the group leader, the management team put Wang as the leader of the group.

=== 2005: Split ===
Since the disbandment, Wang, Tseng, and Shen remain active in the entertainment industry. Wang became a successful actor. He won Taiwanese Golden Bell Awards for Best Supporting Actor. Tseng is also an active actor and painter. Chang returned to school and worked for some commonplace jobs until 2012. Since 2013, he has been in the catering industry.

Shen went on to become a host in some entertainment shows but he died on 19 October 2012, due to complications that accompanied a brain injury. His funeral was attended by all 4 other members. An left the entertainment industry around 2006, but in 2009 he became a host of a talk show until his death from liver cancer on 1 June 2015. His funeral was attended by former bandmates Wang and Chang.

== Members ==
English name	Chinese name	Date of birth	Place of birth	Other
Kingone Wang	王传一	5 May 1980 (age 44)	Taipei, Taiwan	alumni of National Chiao Tung University
Figaro Tseng	曾少宗	18 November 1981 (age 43)	Kaohsiung, Taiwan	
Peter Chang	张庭伟	2 October 1985 (age 39)	Taichung, Taiwan	
Shone An	安钧璨†	20 September 1983 – 1 June 2015 (aged 31)	Tainan, Taiwan	alumni of Fu Jen Catholic University; birthname "黄益承"
Arroy Shen	申东靖†	27 January 1983 – 19 October 2012 (aged 29)	Taipei, Taiwan	birthname "李水清"

== Discography ==
=== Album list ===
Album #	Album Information
1st	Hey Hah!! Comic Boyz: Released: 19 November 2002; Label: Sony Music Taiwan
2nd	Youth Souvenir Book: Release Date: 29 December 2003; Label: Sony Music Taiwan
3rd	Goodbye Comic Boyz: Release Date: 21 January 2005; Label: Sony Music Taiwan

=== Notable songs ===
- "Youth Souvenir Book" (青春纪念册) – It's widely considered as Comic's most renowned song.
- "Hey! Hah!"
- "Red Dragonfly" (红蜻蜓)
- "Number 2"
- "Hold Me Close"
