= Sam Lee (singer) =

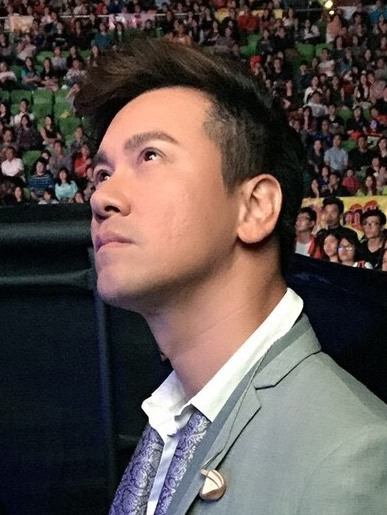
- Born: 21 February 1973 (age 53); Taiwan
- Education: Soochow University in Taipei
- Occupation: Singer-songwriter
- Years active: 1999–present
- Musical career
- Origin: Taiwan
- Genres: Mandopop
- Labels: Asia Grammy; Star East; Rock Records; Zoommuzik; Warner Music Taiwan
- Website: http://www.wretch.cc/blog/samleee Sam Lee's blog

Sam Lee (Chinese: 李聖傑; pinyin: Lǐ Shèngjié; Wade–Giles: Lee Sheng-chieh; Pe̍h-ōe-jī: Lí Sèng-kia̍t, born 21 February 1973,) is a Taiwanese singer and songwriter. He is one-quarter German through his maternal grandfather. He graduated from Soochow University, and was once on the Taiwanese national tennis team.

== Discography ==
=== Albums ===
Order	Release date	Album title
1	1 March 1999	Leng Ka Fei (冷咖啡)
2	27 June 2002	Chi Xin Jue Dui (癡心絕對)
3	26 November 2004	Jue Dui Chi Xin - Shou Fang Kai (絕對癡心•手放開)
4	16 June 2006	Guan Yu Ni De Ge (關於妳的歌)
5	18 January 2008	Shou Fang Zi Ru (收放自如)
6	18 December 2009	Yuan Liang Wo Mei You Shuo (原諒我沒有說)

=== EPs ===
Order	Release date	Title
1	26 October 2013	Guang (光)
2	17 October 2014	Face Mian Dui (Face 面對)
3	25 March 2015	Face II Mian Dui (Face II 面對)
4	17 October 2022	Face II: Zhen - Li (Face II：真·裏)

== Television career ==
- 心動列車

== Awards ==
- 2006 Hito Popular Music Award 年度Hito長壽專輯
