= Angela Zhang =

Taiwanese singer & actress (born 1982)

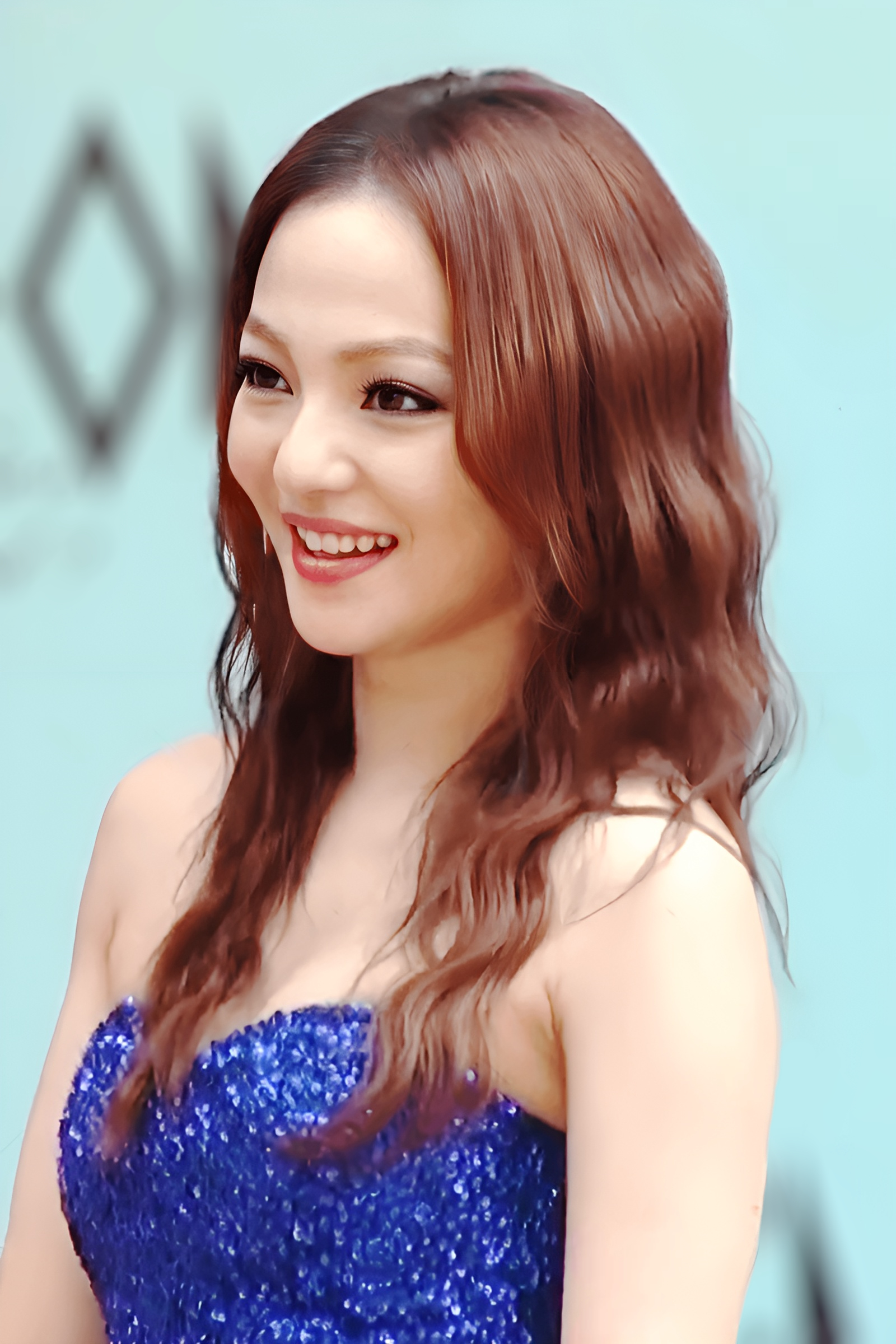
- Zhang in 2021
- Born: Chang Shao-han; 19 January 1982 (age 44); Zhongli, Taoyuan, Taiwan
- Other name: Angela Chang
- Citizenship: Taiwan
- Occupations: Singer; actress; host; entrepreneur; shoe designer
- Years active: 2001–present
- Family: Connie Chang (sister)
- Musical career
- Genre: Mandopop
- Instrument: Vocals
- Labels: Linfair; Wonderful; Ocean Butterflies; HIM International Music

Chinese name
- Traditional Chinese: 張韶涵
- Simplified Chinese: 张韶涵
Transcriptions
Standard Mandarin
- Hanyu Pinyin: Zhāng Shàohán
- Wade–Giles: Chang Shao-han

Angela Zhang Shao-han (traditional Chinese: 張韶涵; simplified Chinese: 张韶涵; pinyin: Zhāng Shàohán; born 19 January 1982), also known as Angela Chang, is a Taiwanese singer and actress.

Zhang gained recognition with the Taiwanese television dramas My MVP Valentine (2002) and At Dolphin Bay (2003). Since 2004, following the instant success of her first album, Over the Rainbow, she has focused on her singing career, releasing popular albums like Aurora (2004) and Pandora (2006), along with starring in another hit TV drama, Romantic Princess (2007). Her career was derailed in 2008 by a public row with her family, which was further worsened by a falling out with her label, Linfair Records. She did not revive her career until the Hunan TV reality show Singer 2018, where she participated as both a host and contestant. Since then, she has shifted her focus to mainland China.

Zhang has embarked on seven concert tours since her debut, including three stadium tours. Her Fable World Tour (2019–2024) spanned 36 shows across mainland China and attracted over one million people.

== Early life ==
Zhang was born into a Hakka family from Zhongli, Taoyuan, Taiwan, as the eldest of three children. She has a sister, Connie Chang Shao-hsuan, and a brother, Carson Chang Po-yu, who is the youngest of the three. Zhang's maternal grandfather was ethnic Uyghur of Taoyuan in Changde, from the Jian family descended from Uyghur Buddhist general Hala Bashi who came to Taoyuan in Changde over 600 years ago, she is related to Jian Bozan, with the rest of her family Hakka. At the age of ten, Zhang moved to Singapore to study. After a few months, she returned to Taiwan because she "was not able to adapt (to life) there". At 12, she and her family migrated to Vancouver, where she attended Sir Winston Churchill Secondary School. She moved back to Taiwan at 19.

== Career ==
=== Early Career (2002-2007) ===
Zhang gained recognition in 2002 when played a leading role in the Taiwanese television drama My MVP Valentine with Taiwanese boy band 5566, followed by a leading role in another Taiwanese television drama At Dolphin Bay with Taiwanese actor Wallace Huo, in which she also sang the ending theme song "The Beautiful Days We Lost" (遺失的美好) and "Journey", a cover of Corrinne May's 2001 song.

Zhang first signed with Linfair Records, making her music debut. She released her first two albums, Over the Rainbow (Chinese: 飛越彩虹) and Aurora (Chinese: 歐若拉), in 2004, and her third album, Pandora (Chinese: 潘朵拉), in 2006.

In 2007, Zhang released her fourth and fifth albums, Flower in the Wonderland (Chinese: 夢裡花) and Ang 5.0. She played in another TV drama, Romantic Princess, and sang the theme song "Don't Want to Understand" (Chinese: 不想懂得).

=== Career hiatus and setback (2008-2012) ===
Zhang took a break from her career in early 2008 and went to Canada for medical treatment. In June 2008, Zhang became a torchbearer for the 2008 Beijing Olympics.

Between 2008 and 2009, she was embroiled in a highly publicized dispute with her family, which led her to sever ties with her parents. A series of allegations made by her family, though unverified, significantly disrupted her career.

Zhang released her 6th album, The 5th Season, in 2009. In 2010, Zhang became a spokesperson of Shanghai Expo 2010 and sang the theme song "The Window of the City". Zhang performed at the first Formula 1 Festival in Shanghai.

Zhang and her younger sister started a new talent agency, ANG Music (Chinese: 天涵音乐), in 2012 and continued her career focusing on the market in mainland China.

== Personal life ==
=== Health issues ===
In 2008, Zhang was diagnosed with mitral valve prolapse and went to Canada for medical treatment while taking a break from her career.

=== Family conflicts and estrangement ===
During her career hiatus in 2008 for medical treatment, Zhang found out that her mother, who has been her manager since her debut, emptied her bank account. In 2009, Zhang was accused by her parents of neglect, while she disputed the accusation. The parents later accused her of drug use, and she later had to come out with a negative drug test to clear her name. That year, she said in an interview that she has cut ties with her parents.

As a result of her family conflict, she has shifted her career focus to mainland China and resides in Shanghai as of June 2023.

== Discography ==
=== Studio albums ===
| Title | Album details | Peak chart positions | Sales |
| Title | Album details | TWN | Sales |
|---|---|---|---|
| Over the Rainbow | Released: January 6, 2004; Formats: CD, digital download, streaming; Label: Linfair Records | — | Asia: 500,000; TWN: 100,000 |
| Aurora | Released: December 1, 2004; Formats: CD, digital download, streaming; Label: Linfair Records | — | Asia: 1,000,000 |
| Pandora | Released: January 1, 2006; Formats: CD, digital download, streaming; Label: Linfair Records | 3 | TWN: 88,000 |
| Flower in the Wonderland | Released: January 12, 2007; Formats: CD, digital download, streaming; Label: Linfair Records | 3 | |
| Ang 5.0 | Released: December 14, 2007; Formats: CD, digital download, streaming; Label: Linfair Records | 1 | |
| The 5th Season | Released: September 25, 2009; Formats: CD, digital download, streaming; Label: Linfair Records | 2 | Asia: 200,000 |
| Visible Wings | Released: October 12, 2012; Formats: CD, digital download, streaming; Label: Wonderful Music | 5 | |
| Angela Zhang | Released: March 7, 2014; Formats: CD, digital download, streaming; Label: Wonderful Music | 1 | |
| Head Over Heels | Released: July 21, 2016; Formats: CD, digital download, streaming; Label: Ocean Butterflies | — | |
| ? | Released: December 18, 2019; Formats: CD, digital download, streaming; Label: HIM International Music | — | |

=== Live albums ===
| Title | Album details | Peak chart positions |
| Title | Album details | TWN DVD |
|---|---|---|
| Angela Chang 2007 World Tour in Taipei | Released: August 3, 2007; Formats: CD, digital download, streaming; Label: Linfair Records | 1 |

=== Collaborations ===
| Title | Year | Notes |
|---|---|---|
| "Adoration to Happiness" | 2004 | featuring Will Pan |
| "Blue Eyes" | 2007 | featuring Sodagreen |
| "3 People" | 2007 | featuring Claire Kuo and Christine Fan |
| "The Star with a Smile" | 2007 | featuring Claire Luo and Christine Fan |
| "Perfect" | 2009 | featuring Harlem Yu |
| "Forever X'mas" | 2009 | featuring Elva Hsiao, Dee Hsu, Vanness Wu, and Lollipop F |
| "Wholly Love" | 2014 | featuring Gillian Chung |
| "See Love" | 2016 | featuring Nicky Wu, Lala Hsu, Jason Zhang, and He Jie |

== Concert tours ==
- Angela Chang Concert Live (2006–2008)
- Angela Singing on Pandora World Tour (2010)
- 100% Angela Zhang World Tour (2015–2018)
- Journey World Tour (2018–2019)
- Fable World Tour (2019–2024)
- Angela Zhang World Tour (2024–2025)
- Seek For Light World Tour (2025–2027)

== Filmography ==
=== Feature films ===
| Year | Title | Chinese Title | Role |
|---|---|---|---|
| 2005 | Love Message | 短信一月追 | Xue Wei |
| 2011 | 10+10 | 十加十 | The Woman (segment "Lane 256") |
| 2012 | Shadows of Love | 影子爱人 | Mei Huizi |
| 2017 | Death Ouija 2 | 碟仙诡谭2 | Qiao Qiao |

=== Television ===
| Year | Title | Chinese Title | Role | Notes |
|---|---|---|---|---|
| 2002 | My MVP Valentine | MVP情人 | Tian Yuxi (Xiao Xi) | Main role |
| 2003 | At the Dolphin Bay | 海豚灣戀人 | Yi Tianbian | Main role |
| 2004 | La Robe de Mariage des Cieux | 天國的嫁衣 | Herself | Guest appearance in episode 19 |
| 2005 | When Dolphin Met Cat | 海豚爱上猫 | Ning Yingzi | |
| 2006 | Bump Off Lover | 愛殺17 | Xu Yizhen & Xu Yijing | Main role |
| 2007 | Romantic Princess | 公主小妹 | Huang Fushan (Xiao Mai) | Main role |
| 2007 | Coming Home | 烽火孤儿 | Teacher Shaohan | Guest appearance in episodes 2 & 3 |
| 2016 | The Adventure for Love | 寻找爱的冒险 | Xia Yi Rou | Supporting role |

=== Music programs and variety shows ===
| Year | Title | Chinese title | Notes |
|---|---|---|---|
| 2012 | Happy Camp | 快乐大本营 | Guest |
| 2013 | The Ultimate Entertainer | 全能星战 | Contestant |
| 2014 | Happy Camp | 快乐大本营 | Guest |
| 2016 | Come Sing With Me | 我想和你唱 | Guest, Episode 7 |
| 2016 | Even the God of Songs - Season 3 | 偶滴歌神啊3 | Guest, Episode 6 |
| 2017 | Masked Singer China - Season 2 | 蒙面唱将猜猜猜2 | Contestant |
| 2018 | Singer 2018 | 歌手6 | Show host/Contestant |
| 2018 | Who's the Keyman | 我是大侦探 | Guest, Episodes: 12, 13 |
| 2018 | Keep Running (season 6) | 奔跑吧6 | Guest, Episode 10 |
| 2018 | Amazing Carla Show - Season 2 | 尖叫卡拉秀2 | Guest, Episode 1 |
| 2018 | Happy Camp | 快乐大本营 | Guest |
| 2018 | The Hero of Music | 天生音雄 | Guest |
| 2018 | Singing in Unison | 异口同声 | Guest, Episode 9 |
| 2018 | Roast - Season 3 | 吐槽大会第3 | Guest, Episode 3 |
| 2018 | Sing Out | 这！就是歌唱 | Main host |
| 2019 | Our Song | 我们的歌 | Guest/Substitute mentor, Episodes: 8, 9, 10 |
| 2019 | The Sound - Season 2 | 声临其境2 | Guest, Episode 10 |
| 2019 | Healing City | 知遇之城 | Guest, Episode 8 |
| 2020 | The Treasured Voice | 天赐的声音 | Regular member |
| 2020 | Perfect Summer | 完美的夏天 | Guest, Episode 12 |
| 2020 | Crossover Singer - Season 5 | 跨界歌王5 | Guest, Episode 11 |
| 2020 | Masked Dancing King | 蒙面舞王 | Judge |
| 2020 | A Date with Luyu | 鲁豫有约 | Guest, Season 7 Episode 5 |
| 2020 | Crystal Girls | 水晶晶女孩 | Main host |
| 2021 | The Treasured Voice - Season 2 | 天赐的声音2 | Regular member |
| 2021 | Keep Running | 奔跑吧9 | Season 9 Guest, Episode 4 |
| 2021 | SPOP Wave | SPOP 艺起唱! | Guest judge, Episode 5 |
| 2021 | Praise the Program | 为歌而赞 | Guest, Episode 1 & 2 |
| 2021 | Bestie Day - Season 2 | 阳光姐妹淘2 | Guest, Episode 3 |
| 2021 | Crazy Magee - Season 8 | 疯狂的麦咭8 | Guest, Episode 1 |
| 2021 | Strawberry Man | 草莓星球来的人 | Guest, Episode 3 |
| 2022 | The Treasured Voice - Season 3 | 天赐的声音3 | Regular member |
| 2022 | Ace vs Ace - Season 7 | 王牌对王牌7 | Guest, Episode 6 |
| 2023 | Infinity and Beyond - Season 2 | 聲生不息·寶島季 | Regular member |
| 2023 | The Detectives' Adventures - Season 3 | 萌探探探案3 | Guest, Episode 4 |
| 2024 | Youth Periplous -Season 5 | 青春环游记5 | Guest, Episode 1, 2, 3 & 8 |
| 2025 | Keep Running | 奔跑吧13 | Season 13 Guest, Episode 1 (2 parts) |
| 2025 | Forever Young | 老有意思旅行社 | Guest, Episode 6 & 7 |
| 2025 | Let's Sing Together | 来吧来吧来吧 | Guest, Episode 1 |

=== Special programs ===
| Year | Title | Songs | Notes |
|---|---|---|---|
| 2018 | Dragon TV 2019 New Year's Eve Concert | 《Aurora》, 《亲爱的，那不是爱情》 | Guest performer |
| 2019 | Dragon TV 2020 New Year's Eve Concert | 《Fable》, 《Keep Walking》, 《Faded》 | Guest performer |
| 2020 | CCTV Spring Festival Gala | 《再次相约二十年》 | Performed with Yang Zi, Roy Wang & Xu Ziwei |
| 2020 | CCTV Valentine's Day Gala | 《Aurora》 | Guest performer |
| 2020 | CCTV National Day Special Program: "Chinese Dream, Ode to the Motherland" | 《守护》 | Performed with Zhang Bichen, William Chan & Julio Acconci |
| 2020 | Zhejiang Satellite TV 2021 New Year's Eve Concert | 《Flower in the Wonderland》, 《香水百合》, 《Keep Walking》 | Guest performer |
| 2021 | CCTV Spring Festival Gala "New Partners" | 《A Better Tomorrow》 | Performed with Jackie Chan, Coco Lee, Li Yifeng, Zhou Dongyu, Zhu Yilong, Gao Weiguang & Lin Peng |
| 2021 | Kuaishou Entertainment Spring Festival Gala | 《Journey》, 《My Lost Happiness》 | Guest; reunion with Ambrose Hsu |
| 2021 | CCTV Spring Festival Gala "Youth Carnival" | 《Aurora》, 《Singing in the Rain + Keep Walking》 | Performed with Li Jiaqi |
| 2021 | CCTV Valentine's Day Gala | 《刀剑如梦》 | Performed with Justin Huang |
| 2021 | CCTV National Day Special Program: "Chinese Dream, Ode to the Motherland" | 《星辰大海》 | Performed with Ayanga |
| 2021 | Shandong Spring Festival Gala | 《Invisible Wings》, 《Breaking the Cocoon》 | Guest performer |
| 2022 | CCTV Spring Festival Gala | 《See The Farthest Place》; 《爱在一起》 | Performed with Li Ronghao |
| 2022 | Jiangsu Satellite TV 2023 New Year's Eve Concert | 《山歌好比春江水》, 《Breaking the Cocoon》, 《The Kite Leads The Way》 | Guest performer |
| 2023 | CCTV Taihu Beauty Concert | 《Keep Walking》 | Guest performer |
| 2023 | CCTV National Day Special Program: "Chinese Dream, Love for the Country" | 《有我》 | Guest performer |
| 2023 | Dragon TV 2024 New Year's Eve Concert | 《Flower in the Wonderland》, 《See The Farthest Place》 | Guest performer |
| 2024 | Forever 22! Bilibili Graduation Concert | 《起风了》, 《亲爱的，那不是爱情》, 《快乐崇拜》 | Guest performer; Performed with Liu Zhang |
| 2024 | Hunan Satellite TV 2025 New Year's Eve Concert | 《暮色回响》, 《Fable》, 《Aurora》, 《Keep Walking》, 《香水百合》, 《Pandora》, 《See The Farthest Place》 | Guest performer; Performed with Roy Wang |
| 2025 | Forever 22! Bilibili Graduation Concert | 《起风了》, 《Invisible Wings》, 《Keep Walking》 | Guest performer |

== Awards and nominations ==
| Year | Award | Category | Nominated work | Result | Ref. |
|---|---|---|---|---|---|
| 2004 | Metro Radio Hits Awards | Best New Artist (Overseas) | | Won | |
| 2005 | Japanese Music Awards | Most Popular Song (Hong Kong/Taiwan) | | Won | |
| 2005 | Singapore Hit Awards | Best Female Vocalist | | Nominated | |
| 2005 | Golden Melody Awards | Best Mandarin Female Singer | Aurora | Nominated | |
| 2006 | Golden Bell Awards | Best Actress | Bump Off Lover 17 | Nominated | |
| 2007 | Golden Melody Awards | Best Mandarin Female Singer | | Nominated | |
| 2007 | Singapore Hit Awards | Best Female Artist | | Won | |
| 2007 | Singapore Hit Awards | Best Stage Performance | | Won | |
| 2007 | Singapore Hit Awards | Artist of the Year | | Won | |
| 2007 | Southeast Hits Awards | Most Popular Female Singer (Hong Kong/Taiwan) | | Won | |
| 2007 | Southeast Hits Awards | Best Song | | Won | |
| 2007 | TVB8 Awards | Most Popular Female Singer | | Won | |
| 2007 | TVB8 Awards | Top Songs | "Don't Hurt" | Won | |
| 2007 | Hito Music Awards | Top 10 Songs of the Year | "Invisible Wings" | Won | |
| 2008 | Golden Bell Awards | Best Actress | Romantic Princess | Nominated | |
| 2009 | Hito Music Awards | Top 10 Songs of the Year | "Don't Want to Understand" | Won | |
| 2013 | Hito Music Awards | Best Stage Performance | | Won | |
| 2013 | Hito Music Awards | Good Voice Award | | Won | |
| 2014 | Global Chinese Music Awards | Best Album | | Won | |
| 2014 | Global Chinese Music Awards | Best Album Producer | | Won | |
| 2014 | Global Chinese Music Awards | All-Around Artist | | Won | |
| 2017 | Hito Music Awards | Best Stage Performance | | Won | |
| 2017 | Global Chinese Golden Chart | Most Popular Female Singer | | Won | |
| 2017 | Music Radio Chinese Top Music Awards | Best Female Singer | | Won | |
