= Eastyle =

Taiwanese boy band

EaStyle's First Album Cover

Eastyle (Chinese: 翼勢力; pinyin: Yìshìlì) is a Taiwanese boy band that does street dancing, Hip hop and R&B.
They were first heard on the radio with the song 'You are My Most Loved Person' (你是我最深愛的人), which was written by the composer - Yong Bang (永邦), but was sung a cappella.
They were first in a group called 貝格斯Beggars with other friends that all had a passion for street dancing. After stopping for about a year, they came up with a new name for their group consisting of 4 members - Eastyle (翼勢力).

The four members of the group are: David (Ah Mei), Casper (Xiao Cao), Javin (Qiu Fan) and Micky (Yuan Tai).

== Members ==
- David
  - Real Name: Xiao Sheng Jie (萧聖傑)
  - Nickname: Ah Mei (ㄚ美), Ames
  - Role: RAP, Song Writer, Beat-Box, Breaking
- Casper
  - Real Name: Dong Wei Lun 董偉倫
  - Name: Xiao Cao (小草)
  - Role: Group Leader, Lead Singer, Music Composer, Breaking
- Micky
  - Real Name: 袁振銓
  - Name: Yuan Tai (元太)
  - Role: Lead Singer, Middle Vocalist
- Javin
  - Real Name: Hui Qiu Fan (許秋凡)
  - Name: Qiu Fan (秋凡)
  - Role: Beat-Box, Teaching members basic dance moves

== Discography ==
=== Albums ===
- EaStyle's First Album (翼勢力同名專輯)
- Released: December 22, 2006
- Label: SYARTS entertainment (神翼國際)
1. Freestyle
2. 雨 (Rain)
3. 藍絲絨 (Blue Velvet)
4. Sha La La
5. 舞道 (Dance)
6. 你是我最深愛的人(Unplugged) (You are My Most Loved Person)
7. Beggars
8. 秋月風 (Autumn Wind)
9. Don't Say Goodbye
10. 闇黑神翼
11. 记忆拼图 (Memory Pieces)
