= Kelvin Avon =

Zambian record producer

Kelvin Avon aka Afreex (born 1975 in Lusaka, Zambia) is a platinum selling music producer, songwriter and mix engineer based in London and Hong Kong, he made his name working on remixes for artists such as P. Diddy, Erykah Badu, Mario, Lumidee, Jamelia and many more. He is currently managed by Stephen Budd Management, Europe's largest producer management company. He spends his time working between London and Hong Kong.

== Biography ==
He was born in Zambia but raised in Hong Kong. Avon started playing the trumpet from age 6. However, he really started to show musical promise when he was bought his first drum machine aged 12. Along with a keyboard/sequencer, Avon showed an ability to recreate any track he heard. He attended New England Institute of Art in Boston, MA, USA. He graduated in 1997 with a diploma in Recording Arts. He then moved to London, UK, in 1998 where he began his musical career, working as a Mastering Engineer for in the London Studio of US-based promotion company, Promo Only.

Emerging from the UK music scene in the late 90s, Avon gained his name for his work with artists such as Shola Ama, Amp Fiddler, Jamelia, Cassius Henry, and Kele Le Roc and for creating the award-winning Union Black ('Best Compilation' Urban Music Award) that featured 20+ artists collaborating on one album. His unique sound and style led him to be managed by the renowned management company, Stephen Budd Management.

Months later Avon was working on the now multi-platinum debut album from N-Dubz 'Uncle B' and called back again to work on their second successful album ‘Against All Odds' In 2009, Avon moved to Hong Kong, where he had once lived as a teenager to expand his scope and merge his influences from the West and the East. He started his company MoFo Music Ltd and within 2 years MoFo became one of the most sought out production companies in the Greater China region producing the biggest names in Chinese Pop music such as Joey Yung (容祖兒), Van Ness Wu (吳建豪), Sandy Lam (林憶蓮), Nicholas Tse (謝霆鋒), Eason Chan (陳奕迅), and many more.

By 2016 MoFo Music had produced over 20 Number 1 hits across the region and over 8 Top Ten Albums. In 2014, MoFo expanded into management by signing their first artist Tien. In Tien, Avon saw the future of China Popstars, the first bi-lingual international star to come out of Greater China and to sell and perform across both markets. Tien exploded on the scene with her performances on China's Music Show ‘Singer’ coming second only to Jessie J in her first performance. Tien quickly became one of the most exciting new artists winning 'Best New Artist' (Guang`dong Radio & TV Awards) and accumulating 1.2 million fans within 3 months on Weibo. Her latest single released in November 2018 for the Hollywood (STX/Hua Yi) movie ‘Adrift’ went to number 9 on the QQ Music Chart.

In an industry that is still relatively unfamiliar to outsiders, Avon has become a unique fixture in the scene, as one of the first Western Producers to 'break' the China Music scene. Having success where many labels have still not managed to break their new artists.

Building on this success, in October 2018 MoFo Music partnered with Metronumm Music from the US, the publishing company of long-term songwriting collaborator Curtis Richardson (Rihanna, J-Lo, Girls Generation, David Guetta, SHINee). MoFo and Metronumm now have one of the most exciting and diverse catalog of songs in the region as well as bringing through many new writers and producers. As a David in a land of Goliaths, Avon and his company MoFo Music are creating waves as trailblazers in the Greater China Music scene, breaking down musical and cultural boundaries. With many more exciting projects set for 2019, MoFo Music is set to become the first International powerhouse Music Production/Artist Management company in the Greater China region.
