= JayR Tinaco =

Australian actor (born 1989)

JayR
- Born: 4 January 1989 (age 37); Manila, Philippines
- Occupation: Actor
- Years active: 2009–present

JayR (born 5 January 1989), formerly known as JayR Tinaco, is a Filipino-Australian actor, known for his roles as Zayn Petrossian in the Netflix series Another Life (2019–2021) and as Dr. Xyler in Space Force (2022).

== Early life ==
JayR was born in Manila, Philippines, and grew up in Queensland, Australia.

Early in his career, agents told JayR that he needed to do more "straight acting". JayR later told Variety: "When you're an actor starting out and you have an agent telling you this, you want to listen because you want to make it and you want to work."

== Career ==
JayR started a career working in the hospitality industry in Sydney. In 2009, he won his first television role performing a trapped student in two episodes of the Australian series Home and Away. Between 2012 and 2015, JayR appeared in short films such as Simone Pietro Felice's The Life Again, Samuel Leighton-Dore's Showboy (in which he portrays a drag queen), and The Wake by Leigh Joel Scott. In 2016, he appeared in two episodes of the Australian series Rake.

JayR moved to Canada to pursue his acting dreams back in early 2017. In September 2018, JayR joined Katee Sackhoff, Tyler Hoechlin, Justin Chatwin, Samuel Anderson and Elizabeth Ludlow in the American series Another Life, broadcast on Netflix. JayR played Zayn Petrossian, the non-binary military doctor aboard the spaceship Salvare. It ran for two seasons from 2019 to 2021. The same year, JayR appeared as the restaurant's host in the Netflix film Always Be My Maybe.

JayR also appears as Dr. Xyler in the second season of the Netflix series Space Force, which was released in February 2022.

== Personal life ==
JayR is non-binary. Regarding his pronouns, he says, "I still identify with the pronouns He/His/Him in my personal life, but I have friends that call me 'they' or even 'she' and I'm okay with that."

== Filmography ==
=== Film ===
Year	Title	Role	Notes
2015	Drown	Dan	
2019	Always Be My Maybe	Saintly Fare Host	
2021	Swan Song	Alex	
2025	F*** Marry Kill	Anthony	

=== Television ===
Year	Title	Role	Notes
2009	Home and Away	Trapped Student	2 episodes
2016	Rake	Qi	2 episodes
2019–2021	Another Life	Zayn Petrossian	Main role
2020	A Million Little Things	Stevie	Episode: "We're the Howards"
2021	One of Us Is Lying	Miko	Episode: "Pilot"
2022	Space Force	Dr. Xyler	4 episodes
2023	So Help Me Todd	Casey Manthine	Episode: "Side Effects May Include Murder"
2023	The Fall of the House of Usher	Faraj	Episode: "The Masque of the Red Death"
2024	Alert: Missing Persons Unit	Skit	Episode: "Maya"
2024	Fire Country	Béla	Episode: "False Alarm"
