= Sleep of Reason =

(The) Sleep of Reason may refer to:

- Sleep of Reason (album), a 2013 album by Raffertie
- Sleep of Reason, a 2005 album by The Eternal
- The Sleep of Reason (Day novel), a novel by Martin Day based on the television series Doctor Who
- The Sleep of Reason (Snow novel), the tenth book in C. P. Snow's Strangers and Brothers series
- The Sleep of Reason, a 2014 horror anthology edited by Spike Trotman

== See also ==
- The Sleep of Reason Produces Monsters, an etching by Francisco Goya
