= Kurt Yaeger =

American actor

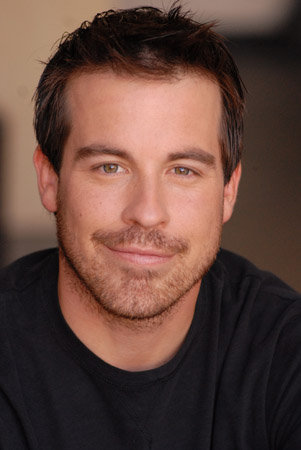
- Born: January 3, 1977 (age 49); San Francisco, California, U.S.
- Occupations: Actor; writer; director; disability advocate; professional BMX rider
- Years active: 2002–present

Kurt Yaeger (born January 3, 1977) is an American actor, writer, director, disability advocate, and professional athlete, who is also a below-the-knee amputee. Recent work includes varying roles on the CBS series NCIS, the HBO/Cinemax series Quarry, Netflix series Another Life, and many other television appearances. Kurt gathered notoriety appearing in season five of the FX series Sons of Anarchy as Greg "the Peg" and in the Rudimental music video for the UK hit single "Waiting All Night" featuring vocals from Ella Eyre.

== Early life ==
Kurt Yaeger was born in San Francisco, California, United States (US), and was raised in South San Francisco. He currently resides in the Los Angeles area.

As a BMX rider, Yaeger gained the nickname "Crowbar" and acquired sponsors for his BMX riding, participating in tours and competing in events.

As an actor, Yaeger auditioned for a Nickelodeon/Clear Channel Communications live tour based on the popular cartoon show Rocket Power. What he thought to be an acting role turned out to be an athletic/stunt role. On the first day of rehearsals, the director found out that his BMX talent was at a professional level and incorporated it into the show. The show briefly toured the US Midwest in spring 2002 before being canceled due to low ticket sales. After experiencing many BMX-related injuries, he decided to go back to college to pursue a master's degree in hydrogeology. In 2006, while attending school in San Francisco, he was in a motorbike crash that resulted in multiple injuries. He hit a pole and went over a 40-foot embankment, crashing on the side of the freeway.

His left leg was amputated below the knee, his right anterior cruciate ligament and medial collateral ligament were torn, his pelvis was torn in half along with his bladder, seven vertebra were broken, his lungs collapsed, multiple ribs were broken, and he had a severe concussion. One year later, Yaeger made a full recovery, returning to his acting career.

== Career ==
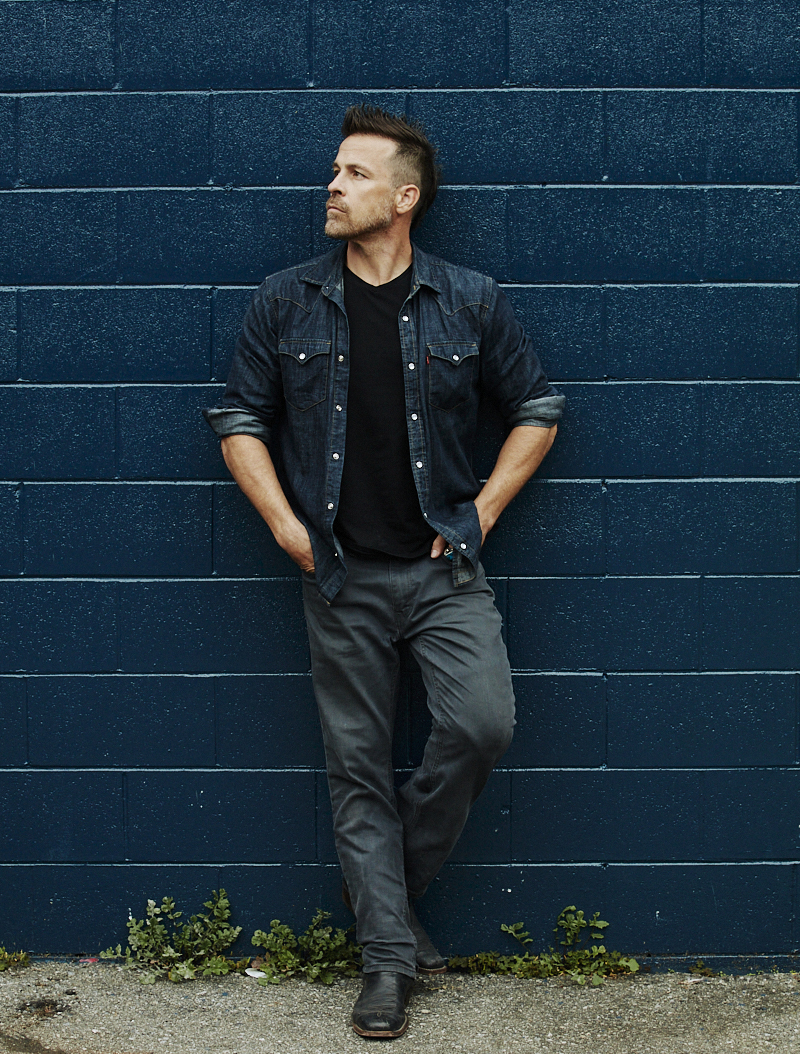
Photographer: Kyrani Kanavaros 2020

Yaeger started taking acting courses and began acquiring role after role. Some of his early work includes Michael Anderson's Tenderloin, a film about one of the most infamous neighborhoods in San Francisco. The film premiered at the Mill Valley Film Festival in October 2009. Yaeger also shares the joy of working on Dolphin Tale with Morgan Freeman, Ashley Judd and Harry Connick, Jr.; Knife Fight with Rob Lowe; War Flowers with Christina Ricci, Tom Berenger and Jason Gedrick; and the Syfy feature film Piranhaconda with Michael Madsen and Rachel Hunter. In 2012, he appeared in a recurring role for six episodes of the highest rated FX television series Sons of Anarchy. Late 2016 brings Yaeger to the set of Cinemax's New Series Original Quarry and to NCIS: Los Angeles for a multi-episode arc. In 2018 Yaeger was cast in CBS All Access series Tell Me a Story. Having 2019 bringing him to star in his third separate NCIS franchise show on NCIS: New Orleans, along with The Rookie, and a spot on the fresh television drama The Village. In 2023 he was cast in NCIS: Hawaiʻi gaining status of the only known actor to appear on all four NCIS (franchise) editions as separate characters. His list of Television and Movie credits continues to grow.

Along with his business partner Josh Gillick, Yaeger created the production company ArtistFilm. It produced several short films and features, such as Sedona's Rule distributed by Green Apple Entertainment, Inc. Yaeger is also involved with the Screen Actors Guild (SAG), American Federation of Television and Radio Artists (AFTRA), and the Actors' Equity Association (AEA) Tri-Union global disability rights campaign called IAMPWD – Inclusion in the Arts & Media of People with Disabilities. He previously served as a chairperson on the AFTRA Los Angeles Local Performers with Disabilities Committee.

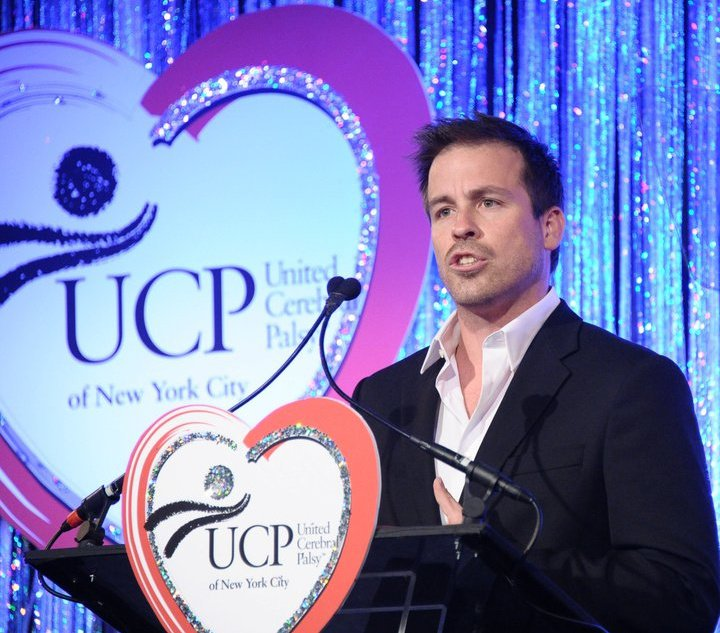
Kurt Yaeger at the UCP – Women Who Care Event 2011

Yaeger volunteers his time with many organizations. He has attended several Big Sunday events for the Wounded Warrior Project, rode in a few of Kiehl's Liferides for amfAR, and participated in the American300 Warrior Tour. He spoke at the 10th and 11th annual United Cerebral Palsy of New York City event called Women Who Care, sharing the stage with Ivanka Trump, Michelle Bachelet, and many others. Yaeger was invited as a keynote speaker to the 2014 Adobe Summit in London on the subject of reinvention. On May 14, 2014, he spoke to an abundance of tech specialists, business entrepreneurs, then introduced the band Rudimental during the Summit Fest that followed. Yaeger's next feat was a run up the Empire State Building in New York City on February 3, 2016. This run was presented by Marmot on behalf of the Challenged Athletes Foundation (CAF). He doesn't cease to put his efforts into activism for awareness of disabilities, specifically in regard to casting for television and movies.

== Sports and affiliations ==
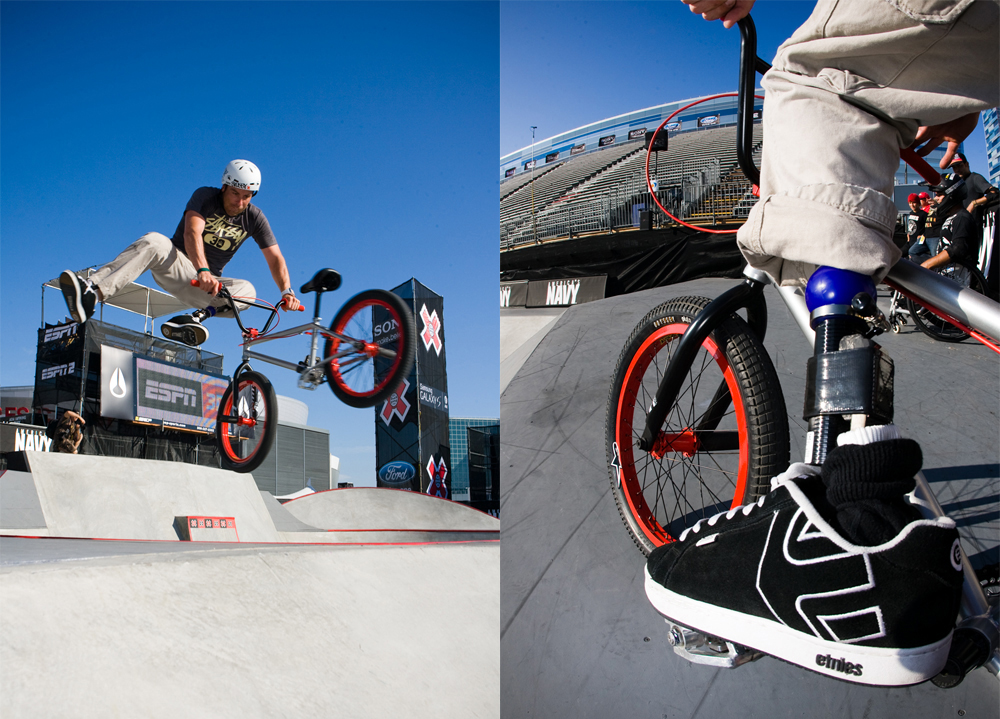
Kurt Yaeger at the X Games 17

His sports comeback came not long after in the Extreme Sports genre of BMX. Kurt is part of a small category of number one Adaptive BMXers in the world, and participated in X Games 16, followed by X Games 17. Yaeger was showcased at the X Games along with other adaptive athletes. All thanks to Adaptive Action Sports, a non-profit organization promoting Action Sports camps, events and programs for youth and young adults living with permanent physical disabilities.

In 2012, the US Paralympics Bobsled & Skeleton Team invited him to train with them in Park City in early January. They asked him back to train with them in Innsbruck, Austria in early March of that year.

2013 had Yaeger participating in a promotional BMX tour of the United Kingdom, followed immediately by a Motorcycle tour of Africa with Touratech-USA. Kurt currently rides motorcycles more than BMX, both personally and as a hobby.

=== BMX sponsors ===
When Yaeger initially began training again, Etnies signed up to sponsor him, supplying shoes that allowed for an expanded experimentation with a new magnetic pedal from ProTonLocks. After he figured out how to stay on the pedals, Solid Bikes and Odyssey helped him by supplying a new bike. The last obstacle was to figure out how to keep his knee from hyper-extending from the repeated impact pressures while riding. He turned to Ossur, who built him a CTi custom knee brace for his prosthetic leg. Other sponsors, including Freestyle Watches, Stüssy, Bern Helmets, Alpine Stars, Challenged Athletes Foundation, Fox Racing, ZICO Coconut Water and more, have all backed Yaeger.

Yaeger was one of the owners of ProTonLocks, Inc., a company that makes magnetic bicycle pedals.

== Filmography ==
Kurt Yaeger has built a multifaceted career as a versatile cinema veteran, taking on roles as an actor, writer, producer, director, and model.

Professional contributions include:

== Television Credits ==
TV
| Year | Title | Role | Type | Season / Episode | notes |
|---|---|---|---|---|---|
| 2026 | Interview with the Vampire (TV series) | Andrew Milkin | TV series | S3.E4 | Episode title: "The Devil's Road". Season 3 series title also known as: The Vampire Lestat. |
| 2025 | Doc | Kevin Cross | TV series | S2.E3 | Episode title: "New Blood" |
| 2025 | Alert: Missing Persons Unit | SGT. Adam Kirby | TV series | S3.E4 | Episode title: "Sophie" |
| 2025 | Doctor Odyssey | Brodie / Billy | TV series | S1.E9 & E10 | Episode title: "Shark Attack!" & "Shark Attack! Part2: Orca" |
| 2024 | Will Trent | Rudy Fritchman | TV series | S2.E8 | Episode title: "Why is Jack's Arm Bleeding?" |
| 2023 | NCIS: Hawaiʻi | Master Sergeant Strand | TV series | S2.E18 | Episode title: "Bread Crumbs" |
| 2022 | Quantum Leap | Ringer | TV series | S1.E8 | Episode title: "Stand by Ben" |
| 2022 | Best Foot Forward (Max Liebman Presents) | Luke | TV series | S1.E7 | Episode title: "Movie Night" |
| 2022 | Station 19 | Carl Swaminathan | TV series | S5.E18 | Episode title: "Crawl Out Through the Fallout" |
| 2021 | Another Life | Dillon Conner | TV series | S2.E3 to EP10 | Recurring character |
| 2021 | SEAL Team | Theo Papadakis | TV series | S4.E12 | Episode title: "Rearview Mirror" |
| 2021 | The Good Doctor | Cort Graham | TV series | S4.E10 | Episode title: "Decrypt" |
| 2020 | L.A.'s Finest | Clete Winslow | TV series | S2.E2, E3, E7 & E8 | Recurring character |
| 2020 | Paradise Lost | Henry | TV series | S1.E9 | Episode title: "The Black Dog Barked" |
| 2019–2020 | Tommy n Bobby | Tommy ShanaCallahan | Web series | 143 Episode span | Main character |
| 2019 | The Village | Joe | TV series | S1.E2, E4, E5 & E9 | Recurring character |
| 2019 | NCIS: New Orleans | Kevin Simms | TV series | S1.E18 | Episode title: "In Plain Sight" |
| 2019 | The Rookie | Graham Ross | TV series | S1.E15 | Episode title: "Manhunt" |
| 2018 | Tell Me a Story | Terry | TV series | S1.E1, E3, E4, E5, E7, E8 & E9 | Recurring character |
| 2018 | Personal Space | Leonard Freeman | TV series | S1.E1 to E28 | Recurring character |
| 2016–2017 | NCIS: Los Angeles | Sullivan | TV series | S8.E8, E9, E10, E14 & E15 | Recurring character |
| 2016 | Quarry | Suggs | TV series | S1.E1 TO E4 | Recurring character |
| 2016 | Shooter | S.C. Jones | TV series | S1.E7 | Episode title: "Danger Close" |
| 2016 | Lethal Weapon | Billy Gottlieb | TV series | S1.E8 | Episode title: "Can I Get a Witness?" |
| 2016 | Pure Genius | Sergeant John Howard | TV series | S1.E4 | Episode title: "Not Your Grandmother's Robotic Surgery" |
| 2016 | Shameless | Gene Charleston | TV series | S6.E2 | Episode title: "AbortionRules" |
| 2015 | The Grinder | Prosecuting Attorney | TV series | S1.E6 | Episode title: "Dedicating This One to the Crew" |
| 2015 | The Ultimate Legacy | Michael | TV movie | | |
| 2015 | A Little Different | Self | TV series | | |
| 2015 | Close Enough | Self | TV series short | | Episode title: "The Fountain of Youth" |
| 2015 | Inside the Extras Studio | Officer Eric McManahee | TV series short | S3.E5 | Episode title: "The Fountain of Youth" |
| 2014 | NCIS | Freddie Linn | TV series | S11.E15 | Episode title: "Bulletproof" |
| 2012 | Sons of Anarchy | Greg the Peg | TV series | S5.E1, E2, E4, E5, E6 & E7 | Recurring character |
| 2010 | The Bold and the Beautiful | Photographer | TV soap opera | Episode #1.5887 | |
| 2010 | General Hospital | Mike – Prison Guard | TV soap opera | Episode #1.12083 | |
| 2008 | Without a Trace | Kevin | TV series | S6.E12 | Episode title: "Article 32" |
| 2007 | The World's Astonishing News | Steve – Father | TV series | | Episode title: "Poor Family's Christmas Miracle" |
| 2002 | Rocket Power | | Live tour | | |

== Movies Credits ==
Film
| Year | Title | Role | notes |
|---|---|---|---|
| 2024 | Sunrise | Gillespie | Release date: 19 January (UK) |
| 2023 | The Beanie Bubble | Billy | Release date: 21 July 2023 (USA) |
| 2018 | The Festival | Pirate | Release date: August 14, 2018 (UK) |
| 2018 | The Dragons of Melgor | Kurt | Announced |
| 2018 | A Doggone Adventure | Steven Hill | Release date: 20 March 2018 (USA) |
| 2017 | Alien Hunger | Brian | Release date: August 30, 2016 (USA) |
| 2016 | Triple 9 | Wounded DHS Guard | Release date: 26 February 2016 (USA) |
| 2014 | Coffee Shop Girl | Agent Rodriquez | Short |
| 2013 | Rudimental – "Waiting All Night" featuring Ella Eyre | Self | YouTube official video |
| 2013 | The Man of the House | Dad | Short |
| 2012 | Honor Killing | Steven | Short |
| 2012 | Knife Fight | Oliver Kennedy | Release date: January 25, 2013 (USA) |
| 2011 | Piranhaconda | Gunner | Syfy channel 2012 premiere |
| 2011 | Dolphin Tale | Veteran Tim | Release date: September 23, 2011 (USA) |
| 2011 | War Flowers | Rufus | Release date: August 31, 2012 (USA) |
| 2011 | Camel Spiders | Joe | Release date: March 4, 2011 (USA) |
| 2010 | Sedona's Rule | Erick | Release date: November 20, 2011 (USA) |
| 2009 | The Real Deal | Bob Derdowski | Video |
| 2009 | Every Other Week | Jude | Short |
| 2009 | The Tenderloin | Ben Keegan | Release date: October 19, 2009 (USA) |
| 2009 | The Hell Patrol | Pvt. Steven McWatt | Release date: September 26, 2009 (USA) |
| 2008 | Asshole of the West | Levi | Short |
| 2007 | Charlie Wilson's War | Afghani Refugee | Not credited |
| 2007 | The Lost Coast | | Video short |

== Producer and Director Credits ==
Producer and director
| Year | Title | Role | notes |
|---|---|---|---|
| 2019 | Forever Has Its Season | Associate producer | Release date: July 21, 2019 (USA) |
| 2019 | Tommy n Bobby | Executive producer | Release date: January 2019 (USA) |
| 2017 | The Creeps | Co-producer | Release date: January 8, 2017 (USA) |
| 2015 | Close Enough | Executive producer and co-star | Release date: April 15, 2015 (USA) |
| 2014 | Kurt Yaeger's UK Tour | Executive producer and co-star | Release date: February 27, 2014 (worldwide) |
| 2010 | Sedona's Rule | Executive producer | Release date: November 22, 2011 (USA) |
| 2008 | Misunderstood | Director and actor | Short – Screening date: June 1, 2008 (USA) |

== Music videos ==
Model
| Year | Title | Role | notes |
|---|---|---|---|
| 2013 | "Waiting All Night" | Self – Video concept loosely based on Kurt Yaeger's story. | UK band: Rudimental Featuring: Ella Eyre |

== Model ==
Model
| Year | Title | Role | notes |
|---|---|---|---|
| 2007 | Porn for Women | A humor or "spoof book", calendar and confectionery cards. | |
