= Andrew Baird (film director) =

Irish director

- Born: March 18, 1976 (age 50); Dublin, Ireland
- Occupations: Film Director , Art director, Commercial director, Music video director,
- Website: alldayeveryday.com

Andrew Baird (born 18 March 1976 in Dublin) is an Irish art director, commercial director, music video director and film director. His feature film debut was Zone 414 (2021), a neo-noir-style science fiction thriller starring Guy Pearce.

== Career ==
=== Education ===
From 1993 to 1997, he studied at the National Film School of Ireland at the Dún Laoghaire Institute of Art, Design and Technology. In 1997, he graduated with Honours with a Bachelor's in Design, Film Direction, and Production Design. In 2001, he earned a Bachelor of Fine Arts from the Screen Director's Guild of Ireland. In 2008, he earned a Bachelor's (with Honours) in production design from the Art Director's Guild.

=== Professional experience ===
His first professional experience was as an art director. Next, he did direction for projects by producer Roger Corman in Ireland and Eastern Europe. In 2006, he moved to Los Angeles where he worked as a production designer on commercials and music videos. He did a music film for pop singer The Weeknd entitled Kiss Land from the albums XO.

His feature film debut was Zone 414 (2021), a neo-noir-style science fiction thriller starring Guy Pearce as a hardboiled detective who pairs up with a prostitute android (played by Matilda Lutz) to find a missing woman. He has also directed the action crime thriller One Way (2022) and the horror western Sunrise (2024). His latest feature, a conspiracy thriller, The Marshal (2027) is in post-production starring Guy Pearce and Bruce Greenwood. It launched at the 2026 Cannes International Film Festival.

== Filmography ==
=== As director ===
| Year | Title | Notes |
|---|---|---|
| 1997 | Traum | Short film; also writer and producer |
| 2001 | The Kiss of Life | Short film |
| 2002 | Up the Country | Short film |
| 2013 | The Weeknd: Kiss Land | Music video |
| 2013 | Gunslinger: Breaking Through | Music video |
| 2014 | Avenged Sevenfold: This Means War | Music video |
| 2014 | Star | Short film; also writer and executive producer |
| 2015 | War Requiem | Short film; also writer |
| 2016 | Korn: Take Me | Music video |
| 2016 | Fever Dream | Short film; also writer |
| 2016 | Rebirth | Short film; also writer and producer |
| 2021 | Zone 414 | Feature film debut |
| 2022 | One Way | Also executive producer |
| 2024 | Sunrise | Also executive producer |

=== as Production designer ===
- 2014: Acid Girls
- 2010: The Portal

=== as Art director ===
- 2015: Fire Meet Gasoline
