= One Way (2022 American film) =

- Release poster
- Directed by: Andrew Baird
- Written by: Ben Conway
- Produced by: Andrew Baird; Martin Brennan; Jib Polhemus; Ryan Donnell Smith; Tim Palmer; Nathan Klingher; Ryan Winterstern
- Starring: Colson Baker; Kevin Bacon; Travis Fimmel
- Cinematography: Tobia Sempi
- Edited by: John Walters
- Music by: Raffertie
- Production companies: 23ten; Baird Films; Ignition Film Productions; Bay Point Media; Short Porch Pictures
- Distributed by: Saban Films
- Release date: September 2, 2022
- Country: United States
- Language: English

One Way is a 2022 American action crime thriller film written by Ben Conway and directed by Andrew Baird. Principal photography began in 2021. The film stars Colson Baker, Kevin Bacon and Travis Fimmel.

== Plot ==
Freddy is on the run with a bag full of cash after a robbery of his crime boss. Badly wounded and betrayed by his father, Freddy gets on a dirty bus where he meets a mysterious girl and a creepy one.

== Cast ==
- Colson Baker as Frederick "Freddy" Sullivan, a young Crime Gang son of Fred Sr.
- Kevin Bacon as Fred Sullivan Sr., a Crime Boss and fortunate drug smuggling father of Freddy.
- Travis Fimmel as Will
- Drea de Matteo as Victoria Menendez, a female crime queenpin boss organization.
- Storm Reid as Rachel
- Luis Da Silva as J.J.
- Rhys Coiro as "Coco"
- Meagan Holder as Christine
- Danny Bohnen as Oleg
- Scotty Bohnen as Caleb
- K.D. O'Hair as Helen
- Thomas Francis Murphy as Patrick, the bus driver
- Casie Baker as Lily
- Jaylen Hodby as Hoodlum #1

== Production ==
On September 11, 2020, it was announced that Colson Baker and Travis Fimmel were cast in the film. On November 2, 2020, it was announced that Kevin Bacon joined the cast. On February 8, 2021, Storm Reid joined the cast.

Principal photography began on February 2, 2021 in Thomasville, Georgia.

On the set, a crew member warned producers about assistant director David Halls's disregard for safety measures and said, "That man is a liability. He's going to fucking kill someone someday, and you're going to be responsible." However, the film's digital imaging technician disputes this claim, saying he knew Halls to be conscientious about safety. Halls went on to work as assistant director on the set of Rust, and he became a principal character in the shooting incident that killed Halyna Hutchins and wounded director Joel Souza.

== Release ==
Saban Films released the film in theaters and through video on demand in the United States on September 2, 2022.

== Reception ==
On the review aggregator website Rotten Tomatoes, 53% of 17 critics' reviews are positive, with an average rating of 5.4/10. Metacritic, which uses a weighted average, assigned the film a score of 46 out of 100, based on 4 critics, indicating "mixed or average" reviews.
