= Raffertie =

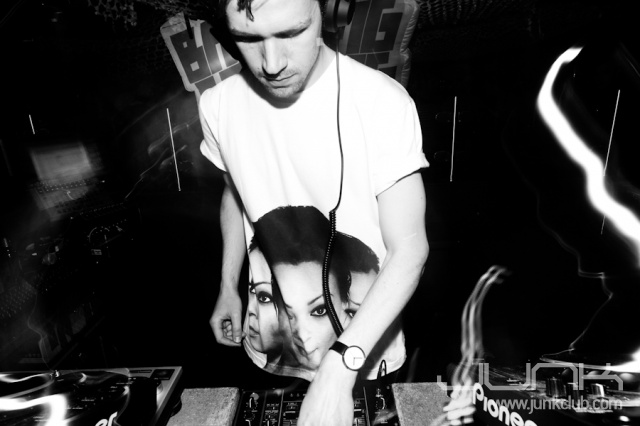
- Raffertie performing live in Southampton
- Born: Benjamin Stefanski; 17 April 1987 (age 39)
- Occupations: Musician; composer; record producer; DJ
- Musical career
- Origin: Bognor Regis, England
- Genres: Electronic music; Experimental music; film scores
- Instruments: Vocals; piano; trumpet
- Years active: 2007–present
- Labels: Ninja Tune; Super Recordings; Planet Mu; Mercury KX/Decca/Universal Classics
- Website: raffertie.com

Benjamin Stefanski (born 17 April 1987), better known by his stage name Raffertie, is a British composer and producer, based in London, England. Recording for Ninja Tune between 2010 and 2013, he now records at Mercury KX and his own label, Super Recordings, which he has run since 2010. Beginning in 2014, Stefanski began to work on film and television scores under the same stage name.

== Career ==
On graduating in 2010 from Birmingham Conservatoire with a degree in Classical & Contemporary Music Composition, Raffertie had already become established in the world of electronic music. Recognised as both a producer and DJ, he has a reputation for performances across Europe from Fabric to Space as well as festivals Glastonbury and Bestival before he had graduated.

Raffertie has experimented with numerous styles, displaying the depth of his production skill across releases for Planet Mu, Black Acre, Super Recordings, Domino, Atlantic, Moshi Moshi and Ninja Tune for which he has received accolades from Simon Reynolds, Huw Stephens and Mary Anne Hobbs.

Hobbs first championed Raffertie when he did a session for her on 7 January 2008 on her BBC Radio 1 Experimental show. He also did another session on BBC Radio 1 for Rob Da Bank in June 2009.

In April 2009, Raffertie's first remix of the Scottish act Franz Ferdinand "No You Girls" (the original reached No. 22 in the UK Singles Chart) was released on Domino. Also, in 2009 Raffertie played at Glade Festival and his track "Do dat" featured on A Trak's Fabric Live 45 mix in March.

"7th dimension," released on Planet Mu, was record of the week on Nick Grimshaw's show on BBC Radio 1 for the week of 18 January 2010.

After graduating in 2010, Raffertie founded Super Recordings and, in 2011, signed a record deal with independent UK record label, Ninja Tune.

"Visual Acuity EP," his first physical release for Ninja Tune was record of the week on Nick Grimshaw's show on BBC Radio 1, who described it as "Crazy, but so, so good." It also received airplay from Rob Da Bank, Lauren Laverne, Huw Stephens, Jen Long and Mary Anne Hobbs.

The debut album Sleep of Reason was released in August 2013 on Ninja Tune. It was followed by the EP Be It All in 2018.

=== Film composition ===
Subsequent to the release of his debut album, Raffertie has largely worked as a film score composer, including a remix of The Heavy's 2009 hit "How You Like Me Now?" for the season 3 finale of Suits in 2014. He has produced the music for ITV's series Strangers, Amazon's series Alex Rider, the 2021 films Zone 414 and Bull, the 2022 film One Way, and the 2023 Amazon series The Continental: From the World of John Wick.

Raffertie also scored the feature film The Substance, which debuted at the 2024 Cannes Film Festival in May 2024.

== Press ==
- DJ Magazine March 2009.
- Mixmag June 2009 his "Wobble Horror EP," released on Planet Mu, received a review of 4/5.
- Mixmag October 2009 Raffertie's remix of Akira Kiteshi's "Boom N' Pow" received a review of 4/5.
- iDJ April 2011 double page spread on Super Recordings.
- Clash "One To Watch" feature September 2011.

== Discography ==
=== Albums ===
- Sleep of Reason (Ninja Tune) – 2014

=== Singles ===
- "Not Asleep" / "Not Awake" (Ninja Tune)
- "7th Dimension" (Planet Mu)
- "Wobble Horror!" (Planet Mu)
- "Pumpin Like Reeboks" (Black Acre)

=== EPs ===
- Visual Acuity (Ninja Tune)
- Rank Functions (Super Recordings)
- Antisocial (Seclusiasis)
- Mass Appeal (Ninja Tune)

=== Remixes ===
- Wolfgang "The King And All His Men" (Atlantic)
- The Heavy "How You Like Me Now?" (Counter Records)
- Daedelus "Overwhelmed" (Ninja Tune)
- Astrid Williamson "Pour" (One Little Indian)
- Throwing Snow & Py "Wallow" (Super Recordings)
- Malente & Jay Robinson "Pop" (Fat!)
- Mr Fogg "Answerphone" (Kicking Ink)
- Vision of Trees "Sometimes It Kills" (Moshi Moshi)
- Photomachine "Technicolor" (Super Recordings)
- Taylor "CMB" (Super Recordings)
- Bang On! "Hands High" (Big Dada)
- Niki & the Dove "Dj, Ease My Mind" (Moshi Moshi)
- CocknBullKid "CocknBullKid" (Moshi Moshi)
- Silver Columns "Cavalier" (Moshi Moshi)
- Rudi Zygadlo "Filthy Logic" (Planet Mu)
- Starkey "Stars" (Planet Mu)
- Wild Beasts "Dancing on Our Tongues" (Domino)
- Franz Ferdinand "No You Girls" (Domino)
- Rogue Element "H.I.V.E" (Exceptional)
- Akira Kiteshi "Boom N' Pow" (Black Acre)
- Hybrid "All Torque" (Sony Computer Entertainment Europe)

== Awards ==
- 2025 – Ivor Novello Award for Best Original Film Score for The Substance
