= Another Life (2019 TV series) =

American sci-fi television series

- Genre: Science fiction; Drama
- Created by: Aaron Martin
- Starring: Katee Sackhoff; Justin Chatwin; Samuel Anderson; Blu Hunt; A.J. Rivera; Jake Abel; Alex Ozerov; Alexander Eling; JayR Tinaco; Lina Renna; Selma Blair; Elizabeth Ludlow
- Composer: Trevor Morris
- Country of origin: United States
- Original language: English
- No. of seasons: 2
- No. of episodes: 20

Production
- Executive producers: Aaron Martin; Noreen Halpern; Chris Regina; Katee Sackhoff
- Producers: Justis Greene; Katee Sackhoff; Omar Madha
- Production locations: British Columbia, Canada
- Cinematography: Ryan McMaster
- Editor: Stein Myhrstad
- Camera setup: Single-camera
- Running time: 37–61 minutes
- Production companies: Navy Productions; Halfire Entertainment

Original release
- Network: Netflix
- Release: July 25, 2019 – October 14, 2021

Another Life is an American science fiction drama television series created by Aaron Martin, which premiered on Netflix on July 25, 2019. The series stars Katee Sackhoff, Selma Blair, Justin Chatwin, Samuel Anderson, Elizabeth Ludlow, Blu Hunt, A.J. Rivera, Alexander Eling, Alex Ozerov, Jake Abel, JayR Tinaco, Lina Renna, Jessica Camacho, Barbara Williams, Parveen Dosanjh, Greg Hovanessian, Chanelle Peloso, and Tyler Hoechlin. In October 2019, the series was renewed for a second season, which was released on October 14, 2021. Netflix announced it had canceled the series in February 2022.

== Synopsis ==
An unidentified flying object shaped like a large Möbius strip lands on Earth and grows a crystalline tower above it. Erik Wallace, a scientist employed by the United States Interstellar Command (USIC), attempts to communicate with the alien structure.

Meanwhile, Wallace's wife, veteran Captain Niko Breckinridge, takes the spaceship Salvare (meaning 'to save' in Latin) and its young crew to determine the origin of the artifact and establish contact with the aliens who sent it. The Salvare is capable of faster-than-light (FTL) travel, and carries most of its crew asleep in hibernation pods (soma on the show), to be awakened when needed.

== Cast and characters ==
=== Main ===
- Katee Sackhoff as Niko Breckinridge, astronaut and commanding officer of the Salvare, on a mission to determine the origin of the alien artifact. Niko's previous ship, the Pilgrim, suffered a disaster which killed ten people, including August's brother and Niko's commander and romantic partner Hudson.
- Justin Chatwin as Erik Wallace, a scientist employed by the United States Interstellar Command, dedicated to finding extraterrestrial intelligent life; he is Niko's husband and Jana's father. On Earth, he investigates the crystalline structure created by the UFO.
- Samuel Anderson as William, the holographic interface of the sentient artificial intelligence aboard the Salvare. He serves as an advisor and friend to Niko throughout season one, and even stands up for her during times of need. He is seen as a real person by Niko, but nobody else. After being infected by the alternate AI Gabriel, William is deleted in order to destroy him and reinstalled as a new "factory reset" version of himself with none of William's memories or experiences, but William regains his memories after reintegrating Iara and his Nico simulation back into himself.
- Blu Hunt as August Catawnee (season 1; guest season 2), the lead engineer and youngest crewmember of the Salvare. Her brother died previously under Niko's command.
- A.J. Rivera as Bernie Martinez, Salvare's microbiologist and part-time chef.
- Jake Abel as Sasha Harrison (season 1), the son of the U.S. Secretary of Defense, serving as the government's representative and diplomatic liaison aboard Salvare. He is seen as weak and is often not trusted by his crewmates.
- Alex Ozerov as Oliver Sokolov (season 1; guest season 2), a Salvare engineer.
- Alexander Eling as Javier Almanzar, a former hacker who is aboard Salvare as an expert in computer engineering.
- JayR Tinaco as Zayn Petrossian, Salvare's medic. Zayn is non-binary.
- Lina Renna as Jana Breckinridge-Wallace, the daughter of Niko and Erik.
- Selma Blair as Harper Glass (season 1; archive footage season 2), a media influencer who attempts to break one of the biggest stories in human history. Like Sasha, she becomes infected with an Achaian implant.
- Elizabeth Ludlow as Cas Isakovic, Niko's second-in-command and pilot of Salvare. She is awakened in episode 2.
- Tongayi Chirisa as Richard Ncube (season 2)
- Dillon Casey as Seth Gage (season 2), a government official who eventually becomes the emissary for the Achaia.

=== Recurring ===
- Tyler Hoechlin as Ian Yerxa (season 1), Niko's initial second-in-command, and the previous commander of the Salvare. Yerxa is killed in the first episode.
- Jessica Camacho as Michelle Vargas (season 1), Salvare's communications expert, who dies after exposure to exotic matter.
- Barbara Williams as General Blair Dubois, United States Interstellar Command, in charge of the U.S.'s efforts determine the intent to the artifact.
- Greg Hovanessian as Beauchamp McCarry, Niko's third-in-command and pilot of Salvare, awakened in episode 7. Beauchamp has a husband back home. Beauchamp is killed by planetary debris in episode 1 of season 2.
- Parveen Dosanjh as Dr. Nani Singh, a scientist; Erik's friend and co-worker.
- Chanelle Peloso as Petra Smith (season 1), a Salvare crewmember. Petra dies from an extraterrestrial virus in the third episode.
- Shannon Chan-Kent as Yara (season 2), a half Achaian AI inadvertently created by William at the end of the first season.
- Kurt Yaeger as Dillon Conner (season 2) The Salvare's engineer in season 2 following the death of August. A military veteran, Dillon has a prosthetic leg after suffering an amputation due to an IED.
- Carlena Britch as Paula Carbone (season 2), the head of the colonists onboard the Salvare. After mutinying, Paula is later discovered partially transformed aboard a crashed alien ship by Niko who mercy kills Paula at her own request.
- Kate Vernon as Ava Breckinridge (season 2), Niko's estranged mother who is also used as an avatar by the Achaians.
- Rekha Sharma as Ursula Monroe (season 2), the software engineer responsible for the development of the AIs William and Gabriel.

=== Guest cast ===
- Allan Hawco as Gabriel (season 2), the Salvare's original AI before the ship was upgraded with William. After Gabriel causes trouble and nearly kills the crew, he is deleted at the cost of William's memories.
- Kurt Yaeger as Dillon Conner (season 2)

== Episodes ==
Season	Episodes	Originally released
1	10	July 25, 2019
2	10	October 14, 2021

=== Season 1 (2019) ===
No. overall	No. in season	Title	Directed by	Written by	Original release date
1	1	"Across the Universe"	Omar Madha	Aaron Martin	July 25, 2019
An unidentified spacecraft appears in the sky above Earth. It lands in a field and grows a crystalline tower above it. Scientist Erik Wallace identifies a signal from the structure, sent to the star Pi Canis Majoris. Erik's wife, astronaut Niko Breckinridge, is assigned command of the spaceship Salvare, replacing Ian Yerxa who becomes her first officer; the ship is sent to follow the signal. One month into the trip Niko is awakened from hibernation early due to a navigational error; the ship's sentient AI, William, advises her that the route to Pi Canis Majoris is blocked by a previously unknown cloud of dark matter. Passing through the cloud at faster-than-light speeds would be unacceptably dangerous; at sublight speeds it will add seven months to the journey. The prime crew is awakened and they attempt to use the star Sirius A to slingshot around the cloud, but the plan fails, and Niko decides they will make the long trip through the cloud. Ian mutinies, with the aid of Oliver and Michelle, and takes command, forcing Niko back into hibernation. Ian uses August's plan to shield the ship and complete the slingshot maneuver, but this too fails, putting the ship in danger. August awakens Niko, who retakes command and manages to save the ship, which is severely damaged in the process. While making repairs, Ian threatens Niko with a weapon in hand and she kills him in self-defence. On Earth, Erik makes a discovery regarding the crystalline structure, and establishes limited communication with it using Eine Kleine Nachtmusik.
2	2	"Through the Valley of Shadows"	Omar Madha	Naledi Jackson	July 25, 2019
Damaged and out of communication with Earth, the Salvare loses most of the onboard oxygen supply; the crew has to vent hydrogen to avoid an explosion. On Earth, Erik is informed of the loss of contact, and goes home to spend time with Jana; he is confronted by media personality Harper Glass, who infers that the Salvare may have been destroyed. Jana later sees Harper's broadcast and is heartbroken. William locates a rogue planet within range of their limited oxygen supply; the planet is rich in a mineral which contains both hydrogen and oxygen. The ship lands on the planet, and Niko awakens pilot Cas Ivakovic, Ian's romantic partner. Cas takes August and Oliver on a mining expedition to obtain oxygen and hydrogen, while Javier and Bernie examine the Salvare for damage; Bernie completes his half of the inspection and stops to gather samples of soil and other matter on the surface. While mining, August and Oliver realize they can raise their visors and breathe and share personal experiences. On the ship, Sasha and Michelle grow close. Pressured by Zayn to talk about Ian's death, Niko finds William running a simulation to determine what Ian was thinking when he died. A low-orbiting moon causes seismic instability, endangering both the ship and the crew on the surface. Javier and Bernie hurry back on board, and Niko orders the Salvare to lift off and pilots a shuttle to rescue Oliver and August. On Earth, Erik discovers a puzzle hidden in the music echoed by the alien artifact. As the crew hold an informal ceremony to mourn Ian, Petra has a violent seizure and collapses.
3	3	"Nervous Breakdown"	Metin Hüseyin	Alex Levine	July 25, 2019
Zayn stabilizes Petra but is unable to find the cause of her seizure. The crew continue repairs on the ship, and the Salvare backtracks to Sirius A to reestablish their position and course. On Earth, Harper ambushes Erik again but he brushes her off. While navigating the ship through Sirius A's Oort Cloud, Niko loses her sight; microbiologist Julian is awakened and determines the crew has been infected by a boron-based viral life form which attacks the nervous system. Though Bernie is not experiencing symptoms, he is revealed to be the source of the virus. Michelle becomes symptomatic and attacks Niko, who fights her off and subdues her. Petra appears to recover naturally, but later dies as her nervous system is forcefully ejected from her body. To prevent further spread of the virus, the air and crew will be ejected into space before a fresh crew is awakened; Niko gives the crew an hour to prepare. Bernie and Julian attempt to develop a cure for the virus, but their one attempt accelerates the symptoms in Julian and Bernie is forced to eject him from the ship. Bernie discovers an actual cure, using gamma rays to kill the virus, and prevents the crew's planned suicide. They use the gamma ray emissions from Sirius B to kill the virus; this has the side effect of sterilizing the crew. On Earth, Erik is unable to solve the puzzle of the artifact transmissions and decides to use Harper's 250 million viewers to crowdsource a solution. The crew returns to hibernation sleep for the extended journey, having repaired the Salvare. Niko wakes up alone, in the dark; she finds August covered in blood nearby, gasping that something on the ship is hunting them.
4	4	"Guilt Trip"	Metin Hüseyin	Amanda Fahey	July 25, 2019
Niko and an awakened and armed Cas carry August to the medical bay; August is grabbed by an unseen creature and disappears. Niko watches as the rest of the crew are taken one by one; defeated and alone, she returns to her hibernation pod and falls asleep. It is revealed that Niko is still asleep; the hibernation system is failing and the rest of the crew are awake, with her stuck in her failing hibernation pod. Niko dreams alternate versions of her past and future; a debriefing with DuBois after the Pilgrim incident, a funeral for the Pilgrim crew, and Jana's next birthday. The crew attempt to awaken her unsuccessfully; William inserts himself into her dreams but is rejected. The crew discovers a moon in the Goldilocks zone of a nearby star, with a possible life-bearing environment, and concern for their food and water supplies provokes some argument over diverting to it; Cas initially refuses but then drops the Salvare out of FTL and changes course for the moon. Sasha and Michelle have a romantic encounter. Niko, still dreaming, finds herself on the Salvare but with the Pilgrim crew, and realizes she is reliving the Pilgrim incident over and over. William re-inserts himself into Niko's dream against Cas' orders, and leads her to the realization that she must accept her decision on the Pilgrim which killed 10 people, including her commanding officer and romantic partner Hudson, and August's brother, as the only possible one. She does so, and Zayn manages to wake her. William discovers that the moon they are now approaching is emitting a signal like the one from the structure on Earth; long-range sensors show a similar crystal structure on the moon.
5	5	"A Mind of its Own"	Mairzee Almas	Romeo Candido	July 25, 2019
The Salvare shuttle lands on the moon, carrying Niko, Cas, Sasha, Zayn, and Bernie. They tank up with fresh water and then hike to the crystal artifact; as they leave something follows them underground. Zayn and Bernie try to find food, but everything they try tastes horrible. Sasha attempts first contact with the crystalline structure, unsuccessfully. Cas informs Niko of her involvement with Ian; in turn, Niko reveals her involvement with her commanding officer on Pilgrim. Bernie is injured by a stick after encountering an insect, and his leg becomes infected, apparently by the native plant life. Cas and Niko recover a broken-off piece of the crystal tower, and become inebriated from plant pollen. Alone, Sasha is unexpectedly sucked inside the crystal structure. On the Salvare, August, Oliver and Javier are stuck with maintenance duties; both Oliver and Javier are attracted to August, and both eventually kiss her. On Earth, Erik and Harper are threatened by DuBois, who has discovered the leaked material; their crowdsourcing effort pays dividends when a young man named Marcus identifies a pattern in the sound waves which resembles the crystal tower. On the moon, Cas and Niko search for Sasha, finding him dazed outside the tower; Zayn arrives with the injured Bernie and they return to the shuttle. On the way, they are attacked by gigantic insects from underground; the shuttle lifts off and they return to the Salvare, accidentally bringing a small insect on board. Michelle and Sasha have a sexual encounter but are interrupted when Sasha sees a duplicate of himself. A malfunction occurs on the Salvare; William disappears and becomes unresponsive while talking to Niko, followed by loss of gravity and a fire in the shuttle bay.
6	6	"I Think We're Alone Now"	Mairzee Almas	Lauren Gosnell & Alejandro Alcoba	July 25, 2019
The crew are unable to bring William back on-line. Sasha continues to see his duplicate, and believes he is hallucinating as no one else can see it. August finds the remains of the small alien insect from the moon; it caused the fire in the shuttle bay. Sasha goes to Zayn for medical help; they assign him meditation exercises and do a CT scan. Bernie offers Sasha a recreational drug distilled from the plants on the alien moon, which he has secretly cultivated on board. William reappears but malfunctions, identifying multiple non-existent fires, and initiates the "Go Home Protocol" before going off-line again. This splits the ship, sending the lower decks with the hibernation pods on a return course for Earth. Niko attempts to recouple the ship; Cas lashes out at her for things said while on the alien moon. One of the coupling clamps fails, and Niko is forced to EVA to repair it; while outside the ship, she observes damage near the exotic matter compartment before the Salvare unexpectedly jumps to FTL, leaving her behind. In flashbacks, we learn that Niko and Cas met when Cas was involved in Niko's kidnapping for ransom while working in post-flood Boston. Cas returns the Salvare to search for Niko, who is rescued when she punctures her EVA suit and ignites the escaping oxygen as a flare. Sasha keeps seeing his duplicate, who convinces him to "let me in." The damage to the exotic matter compartment causes a catastrophic overload, and Michelle is forced to manually shut down the exotic matter reactor before the ship is destroyed; exposure to exotic matter causes her body to disintegrate and Cas, in temporary command, feels guilt for her death. Niko and William awaken a replacement for Michelle. Sasha returns to the med bay, telling Zayn that he is fine; out of sight, he deletes the results of his CT scan, showing something attached to the surface of his brain.
7	7	"Living the Dream"	Allan Arkush	Lucie Pagé	July 25, 2019
On Earth, Sasha's father, Secretary of Defense Egan Harrison takes over the artifact program. Using Marcus' data, Erik finds a way to communicate with the structure using light; a door opens at the base of the structure. A drone sent inside captures an image of what appears to be Sasha. On the Salvare, new crewmember Beauchamp prepares to navigate through the dark matter cloud. Sasha tries to determine the plans for the aliens should his diplomatic efforts fail; Niko rebuffs him. On Earth, Nani intends to enter the structure but has a panic attack and Erik goes in her place, despite Jana's fears. Inside, Erik finds himself in a simulation of his own memories of Niko; he is offered the solution to a complex mathematical problem but follows a simulated Jana instead and leaves the structure. On the Salvare, Sasha learns from Javier that the ship's protective lightspeed bubble can be focused into a weapon, referred to as Operation Brimstone. He tries to force Javier to tell him how to deactivate William, who controls the weapon; Javier refuses and Sasha, revealed to be under alien control, extrudes metallic probes from his eyes into Javier's. On Earth, this is visible through the door as Egan, Harper and an armed escort approach, with Egan intent on entering the structure. Sasha, seeing their approach, triggers a blast of sound from the structure, which kills Egan and injures Jana, who has escaped from her babysitter. Harper is dragged through the door into the structure before it closes.
8	8	"How the Light Gets Lost"	Sheree Folkson	Sean Reycraft	July 25, 2019
The Salvare enters the dark matter cloud; Beauchamp takes the first shift as pilot while the rest of the crew have a meal. Sasha provides a salad spiked with Bernie's stash of pollen from the plants on the alien moon, enhancing the emotions of the entire crew. Javier becomes violent, Cas morose, Oliver and August aroused, Zayn ecstatic, and Niko hallucinates Erik outside the ship. As he is the only crewmember unaffected, Niko puts Beauchamp in charge and has William simulate a party to burn off the 'high'. William and Niko dance; Sasha and Javier observe that William is becoming attracted to Niko and Sasha encourages this. Bernie kisses Zayn; and Javier, Oliver and August initiate a threesome. Javier becomes intimate with Oliver, who shows interest; however, Oliver returns his attention to August, who then excludes Javier. With both Oliver and August no longer interested in him, Javier angrily leaves. William simulates Erik for Niko and creates a romantic/sexual encounter for her, after which Niko is embarrassed and asks him to forget it. Javier, rejected by August, leaves and discovers Sasha has stolen his shipboard identity and is trying to shut down William; Sasha attacks him again, leaving him unconscious and apparently brain-dead. Trying to aid Javier, Bernie, Niko and Zayn learn that Sasha did not eat any of the salad and was unaffected, and discover his deleted CT scan. Sasha tricks a saddened and confused William into shutting himself down and begins to take control of the ship, isolating the crew and attacking Beauchamp as Niko watches, locked out of the flight deck. On Earth, DuBois is reinstated to the artifact program, and Erik learns that the blast gave Jana an advanced form of leukemia. Harper is released from the structure and collapses.
9	9	"Heart and Soul"	Sheree Folkson	Jackie May	July 25, 2019
On the flight deck, Cas attacks Sasha and unlocks the door for Niko; they rescue Beauchamp and lock Sasha in. Sasha takes control of the ship, stranding the crew in various compartments, jumping to FTL, and setting the reactor to overheat and explode. Niko sends Bernie to re-enable the cooling system; he does so, but is electrocuted, and Zayn revives him. Niko reboots William, but he has no memory and has reverted to a normal AI system. On Earth, Erik interrogates Harper at DuBois' request; Harper's brain has the same construct as Sasha, and she reveals the aliens are called the Achaia. She claims they can help Jana, but DuBois has Erik removed, believing the aliens are manipulating him. Niko attempts to awaken another crewmember, Azami, but Sasha interrupts the process and kills Azami. Beauchamp recovers and realizes that Sasha has set the ship on a course for a black hole in the dark matter cloud. The jump to FTL has brought them significantly closer to Pi Canis Majoris, so Niko orders the crew to abandon ship in the shuttle and head for the destination to complete the mission; she confides in Cas the reason William shut himself down, and Cas agrees to pilot the shuttle. Niko remains behind and uses a hibernation pod to contact William and apologize to him; William recovers his memories but his relationship with Niko remains strained. Sasha interrupts, waking her, and the two stage a running fight through the ship; Sasha is choking Niko when William reactivates and electrifies the floor, knocking both unconscious. Niko recovers; she and William use the power source for Sasha's brain implant to boost the Salvare away from the black hole. Niko recovers the shuttle and crew, and the Salvare approaches the Achaia's planet; William detects a strong artifact signal from the surface.
10	10	"Hello"	Allan Arkush	Aaron Martin	July 25, 2019
Niko, Cas and Oliver land on the planet at Pi Canis Majoris, which has another crystalline tower. Niko and Cas hike towards the tower, detouring to examine some caves and the ruins of a city. In a primitive shelter in the cave they encounter a bat-winged humanoid and an artificial intelligence; the AI informs them that the planet is not Achaia, but Zakir. The Achaia landed on Zakir five years previously and are not friendly; they control more than 300 star systems and their home planet is more than 400 light years away. Cas and Niko discover the ruins of the city are filled with the skeletal remains of dead Zakir, implanted in the same way that Sasha was. Sasha, feverish and imprisoned in the med bay isolation lab, asks to be killed; he attacks Zayn, forcing Bernie to kill him. Zayn removes the implant from Sasha, and William reprograms it; they implant it in Javier, who regains consciousness. August discovers she is pregnant. On Earth, DuBois intends to have Harper's implant surgically removed; Harper kills her guards and surgical team while under sedation. Erik provides her a pass to escape, in return for her ensuring Jana's recovery. Erik takes Jana into the alien structure, and Harper broadcasts to the world that the Achaia are on Earth and are peaceful. On the Salvare, William simulates Niko and gives the program emotions equivalent to his to help resolve his tense relationship with the real Niko. Cas and Niko decide to help the Zakir and use the Salvare's Brimstone energy weapon to destroy the Artifact. Niko, Cas and Oliver return to the ship; August informs Javier and Oliver of her pregnancy and that one of them is the father. Bernie and Zayn have a sexual encounter. William attempts to delete his Niko simulation, but is unable to do so, and the simulation changes form, calling him "Mother". Five Achaian ships approach Zakir and obliterate the planet. Niko sets the Salvare on a return course for Earth and attempts to jump to FTL.

=== Season 2 (2021) ===
No. overall	No. in season	Title	Directed by	Written by	Original release date
11	1	"Live to Fight Another Day"	Kevin Dowling	Aaron Martin	October 14, 2021
The Salvare is caught in the debris field from the destroyed planet Zakir and is unable to jump to FTL. Beauchamp is killed when planetary debris penetrates the hull. The crew use the partially completed FTL bubble to protect the ship while they ride the debris shockwave, which hides them from the Achaian ships. William introduces Niko and Cas to the other AI; she is part human, part AI and part Achaian. William isolates her from the Salvare functions and confines her in the exotic matter compartment. Bernie and Zayn develop a screen to prevent Achaian interference with Javier's implant. Niko awakens Richard to replace Beauchamp and advise her on possible combat with the Achaia. The ship continues to be battered by debris and Niko pilots them clear of the debris field before the FTL bubble collapses. August and Oliver EVA to repair the FTL drive; an Achaian ship appears and attacks the Salvare, damaging the impulse drive and causing it to vent plasma, incinerating August and Oliver before they can return to the ship. Richard and Niko interrogate the new AI, who names herself Iara and changes form again. Iara communicates with the Achaian ship; the Achaia communicate intent to discuss a peaceful solution with Niko, who leaves the ship in a shuttle to meet with them. On Earth, Erik enters the structure with Jana; he places her in a hospital bed and she disappears. A door appears and when he enters it he finds himself outside the structure again. Harper has disappeared and DHS has taken over the operation around the structure.
12	2	"Smoke and Mirrors"	Kevin Dowling	Lauren Gosnell	October 14, 2021
Niko enters the Achaian ship; it appears to be empty except for flashes of light and energy, which accumulate into a mass of coloured light. Communications with the Salvare are blocked; Niko enters the mass of coloured light and is transported to a simulation of Jana's hospital bed. Jana awakens, healed, and talks with Niko, who gives her her wedding band. Jana then exits the Achaian structure on Earth and returns to Erik, showing him her mother's ring. Niko is moved to a simulation of her mother at a meditation retreat, and realising it is a simulation begins to negotiate unsuccessfully with the Achaia. Cas finishes repairing the FTL drive and sends Iara to the Achaian ship to determine if Niko is alive; Iara hacks the Achaian ship and begins accumulating information before appearing in the simulation with Niko. The Achaian avatar throws her off the ship and back to the Salvare. William reports that four additional Achaian ships are approaching. Cas spacewalks to the Achaian ship to rescue Niko, now in another simulation, this one of Jana's funeral, and being attacked by an avatar of Erik, while an Achaian implant attempts to enter her physical body. Fighting this off, Niko recovers her senses and meets Cas; they attempt to contact the Salvare but are unsuccessful. Richard orders Iara to hack the Achaian ship again to buy time, while the Salvare jumps to FTL, leaving Niko and Cas stranded.
13	3	"My Own Worst Enemy"	Kellie Cyrus	Alex Levine	October 14, 2021
The Achaian ship pursues the Salvare at FTL. The Achaians place Cas in a simulation and attempt to convince her to act as their spokesperson on Earth. Niko attempts to wake her and argues with the avatar of her mother. On the Salvare, Richard wakes Dillon as a replacement engineer. Javier discovers a physical connection with Iara. Niko attempts to destroy the Achaian vessel by overloading the shuttle engine, but her mother-avatar prevents her from doing so and breaks into the shuttle. The Salvare and the Achaian ship are forced out of FTL by energy surges from a magnetar; the pulses affect Javier's implant, causing him to have a seizure, and cause the avatar of Niko's mother to disintegrate. The Achaian ship is badly damaged by the magnetar and the Achaians offer peace if Niko can protect them from it. Richard and Dillon forcibly remove the implant from Javier against Zayn's wishes, to determine the reason the magnetar is damaging to Achaian technology; Bernie monitors the implant through the next pulse from the magnetar, which completely destroys it, and determines that the wave of neutrinos emitted by the magnetar is destructive to Achaian technology. Niko and Cas spacewalk to the Salvare; Niko has Dillon rig a tractor beam using the internal gravity generator. The tow is successful, but Iara deliberately collapses the tractor beam before the Achaian ship can be pulled clear of the magnetar. As the next pulse will irreparably damage the Salvare Niko is forced to jump to FTL and the Achaian ship is obliterated. On Earth, Erik is kidnapped by humans wearing "alien" masks, who demand that he cease his efforts to communicate with the Achaia.
14	4	"Will to Power"	Kellie Cyrus	Lucie Page	October 14, 2021
Iara is accused of collapsing the tractor beam, but denies having done so. Richard and Dillon investigate her code, effectively torturing her; Niko stops them and directs them to examine William's code as well. Cas identifies a habitable planet and Niko awakens Paula, the leader of the colonists held in soma sleep, to investigate the planet and determine if it is a suitable location for a colony. Examination of William's code leads to the discovery of an alternate AI personality, Gabriel, apparently intended as an upgrade for William. Cas, Bernie and Paula land on the planet and begin their investigation. William, concerned that his mistakes may have endangered the crew and the mission, abandons control to Gabriel. The habitat pod is sent to the planet by Gabriel but lands at an alternate site. Dillon realizes that William is the upgrade for Gabriel, not the other way around, and informs Niko; Gabriel cuts off life support to the crew and jumps the ship to FTL, intending to join the Achaians and stranding Cas and the others on the planet. Iara, discovering that Gabriel was responsible for terminating the tractor beam as well as William's other "mistakes" over the course of the mission and is killing the crew, attacks him and seizes control of the Salvare, restoring life support. William and Iara reveal that William and Gabriel's codes are too intertwined, meaning that deleting Gabriel will also delete William. With Gabriel proving to be too powerful for him to control, William urges Niko to do a full reset of the AI interface and then a clean reinstall, sacrificing William to get rid of Gabriel; Niko reluctantly gives the order and both Gabriel and William are deleted. On Earth, Eric re-enters the structure and meets an Achaian avatar of himself.
15	5	"A Better Earth"	Shannon Kohli	Alejandro Alcoba	October 14, 2021
Cas, Bernie and Paula, stranded on the colony planet, encounter evidence of an apex predator lifeform. On the Salvare, Dillon reinstalls the AI interface, but it results in a William who is a "factory reset," lacking the memories of their friend; Niko has trouble accepting the "new" William. With the FTL systems repaired, the Salvare returns to the planet and recovers the stranded crew. The planet appears perfect; Niko authorizes the revival of the 24 colonists and preparation for establishment of the colony. On the planet, the colonists encounter the predator lifeform again; the creatures appear to be intelligent, capable of strategy and communication, forcing Niko to abandon the plan to colonize the planet over Paula's objections. Richard enlists Iara's aid in deciphering the captured Achaian data; she grudgingly agrees and they discover a nearby cosmic string which can be used to reestablish FTL communications with Earth via wormhole. This allows a brief communication window in which they retrieve mission updates and personal messages, also alerting Earth that the crew are still alive. Iara, Dillon and Richard determine that a high-energy loop string might allow them to create a wormhole large enough to transport the Salvare home in the same manner in which Achaian ships travel - proven by Niko's discovery that her ring arrived home with Jana. Paula mutinies and attempts to launch the colony pods; Niko, pressed for time to reach the nearest suitable cosmic string, allows her to leave. The Salvare reaches the string and establishes a large wormhole to Earth but can only fit part of the ship through. Niko activates the "go home" protocol and sends part of the ship through the wormhole, remaining behind alone; Iara deliberately strands Richard with her. On Earth, Erik receives an ultimatum and a gift from the Achaian avatar: abandon FTL travel and stay within the solar system, in exchange for which the Achaians will help repair the Earth's biosphere.
16	6	"Gift From the Gods"	Shannon Kohli	Romeo Candido	October 14, 2021
After a rough transit, the ship exits the wormhole near Jupiter, but it is forced to continue on impulse engines. Iara's Achaian coding is revealed to be taking over her human half, causing her to abandon Richard. Iara realizes that her Achaian half is trying to access all of her data on their secrets and insists that the crew needs to shut her down to keep the Achaians from using her to do any more harm; the crew traps Iara within a simulation inside of William, making her think that she has been released on a shuttle. On Earth, after learning from a transmission of Niko's fate, Erik desperately tries to get the Achaia to rescue her without success, resulting in Seth Gage taking an Achaian implant to become their new representative. Erik later contacts the group that had kidnapped him for help only to learn that they have killed Harper Glass and removed her implant for study. When Erik refuses, the resistance uses his biometrics to download the data package from the Salvare, but Seth leads a raid that wipes the resistance out before using his implant to download information from the leader's mind; the information clears Erik of any wrongdoing, but Erik learns that some of Seth's soldiers also have implants and Cas warns Erik that Niko's mission to stop the Achaia continues.
17	7	"Never Gonna Give You Up"	Avi Youabian	Aaron Martin	October 14, 2021
Trapped in space for a week, Niko figures out a way to "sail" back to the colony planet and she and Richard spend time bonding with each other. However, their seemingly hopeless situation results in Richard becoming depressed and suicidal while something is apparently on the ship with them causing chaos that only Niko can see. Eventually, the two discover that a glitch has caused the atmospheric pressure to be too high, giving them nitrogen narcosis which caused all of their problems. On Earth, Seth and Erik attempt to find out what the crew is holding back about the magnetar encounter, only for Erik to learn that Seth has wiped the crew's memories of the entire thing, including Cas' warning to Erik when she returned to Earth. As USIC engineers decommission the ship's FTL drive, William attempts to create a neutrino weapon without success. William is confronted by his Niko simulation and Iara who urge him to reintegrate their code into his own as, having been created from William himself, it contains the memories that he had lost when Niko was forced to delete William in order to get rid of Gabriel. William reintegrates the two, restoring all of his lost memories. Although Niko and Richard fix the pressure problem, their sail is destroyed, and they are left with only two weeks left of oxygen. As they prepare to commit suicide rather than continue to suffer, an unknown alien ship arrives and surrounds them in a bright light.
18	8	"Just a Rat in a Cage"	Avi Youabian	JP Larocque and Maggie Gilmour	October 14, 2021
On Earth, the Salvare crew realize that Zayn had told Seth about the magnetar in exchange for their mother being healed of a terminal illness; although Zayn expresses guilt, the rest of the crew are forgiving. Cas and Erik manage to sneak onto a supply shuttle to the Salvare where Seth attempts to extract the data from William, eventually bringing in his creator Ursula to help. On the alien ship, Niko and Richard are tortured and experimented upon before Niko is sent to a frozen planet to retrieve an alien energy core from a crashed ship. On the ship, Niko finds a partially-mutated Paula who reveals that the aliens, the Decuma, had captured and experimented upon the colonists after the departure of the Salvare, leaving Paula as the only survivor. Paula explains that unless Niko can find a way to remove her and Richard's Decuma wristbands, they will also be mutated. At Paula's request, Niko reluctantly mercy kills her before retrieving the energy core, a tool that can remove the wristbands and a weapon. Using the information given to Niko by Paula about the Decuma's weakness to cold, Niko and Richard are able to kill their captor and take over the ship, using its systems to reverse Richard's mutation. However, they discover that the ship doesn't have the range to return them to Earth. Instead, Niko decides to take the Decuma ship to a nearby planet with an Artifact where she will accept the offer to be their emissary if the Achaia will return her and Richard to Earth.
19	9	"What's Brought/What's Left Behind"	Metin Hüseyin	Sean Reycraft	October 14, 2021
As Cas and Erik infiltrate the Salvare, the rest of the crew release a video warning about the Achaia. Ursula attempts to hack into William's code and steal the data on the neutrino weapon, stating that she believes that the Achaia are their only chance at saving the world from humanity's destructive nature. At the same time, Niko and Richard land the Decuma ship on a planet with an Artifact where drawings indicate that the native species had worshipped the Achaia. The two are allowed into the Artifact after Niko offers to become the Achaian representative, terrifying Seth of being replaced. William offers the data to Seth in exchange for being downloaded into an implant that will allow him to take over the body of Erik and the Achaia returning Niko and Richard to Earth. Seth accepts the deal, only to have William reveal that he was tricking him. As Cas distracts Seth in the real world, William downloads himself into the implant and holds Seth off in the Artifact as Niko and Richard finally make it back to Earth through a doorway that Seth opens to the Earth Artifact. With Ursula's help, William escapes the implant before it's destroyed and Seth is captured, but an Achaian ship approaches the Salvare on an attack course. William, Erik and Ursula frantically work together to turn the Salvare's FTL drive into a neutrino weapon and as everyone else watches from the ground, an explosion lights up the night sky. However, it's unclear which ship has been destroyed.
20	10	"D-Day"	Metin Hüseyin	Aaron Martin	October 14, 2021
The Achaian ship is destroyed by the Salvare. The Achaians send an invasion force in response, demanding through Seth, before killing him, that humanity destroy the Salvare by flying it into the Sun, allow more Artifacts to land and for everyone to accept implants within 24 hours. The crew of the Salvare discover that the Achaians they have been fighting are artificial lifeforms and come up with a plan to infect them with a computer virus based on human DNA created by William and Ursula. Niko allows herself to become the host to a dying Achaian and carries it to the Artifact where the Achaians take Niko and Cas prisoner. Taking the form of multiple people, the Achaians reveal that they had never intended to have peace with humanity, seeing the human race as a cancer that will spread across the Galaxy if they are not stopped. Before Niko and Cas can be killed, the virus takes effect and they escape as the Artifact implodes. The surviving Achaian Rings retreat from the solar system in time for William to stop the Salvare's course into the Sun. The solar system is bombarded with messages from numerous other races that are revealed to be grateful for them stopping the Achaians. Using Achaian technology, William is able to project his image through a wormhole to Earth and believes that they will be able to build him a physical form eventually. Now knowing that they are not the only life in the universe, another mission is launched sometime later on the Salvare 2 to expand the horizons of humanity and make contact with other species using wormhole travel.

== Production ==
=== Development ===
On April 26, 2018, Netflix announced that it had given the production a series order for a ten-episode first season. The series was created by Aaron Martin who is also credited as an executive producer alongside Noreen Halpern and Chris Regina. On June 19, 2019, it was confirmed that the series would premiere on July 25, 2019. On October 29, 2019, Netflix renewed the series for a second season which was released on October 14, 2021. Sackhoff revealed in February 2022 that the series was canceled.

=== Casting ===
On April 26, 2018, it was announced that Katee Sackhoff had been cast as a series regular. On August 21, 2018, it was reported that Selma Blair had joined the cast in a recurring role. On August 28, 2018, it was announced that Tyler Hoechlin, Justin Chatwin, Samuel Anderson, and Elizabeth Ludlow had joined the cast. The following day, Blu Hunt joined the cast. In September 2018, the rest of the main cast was revealed. On June 23, 2020, Tongayi Chirisa was cast as a series regular while Dillon Casey, Shannon Chan-Kent, and Kurt Yaeger joined the cast in recurring roles for the second season. In December 2020, it was announced that Carlena Britch had been cast in the recurring role of Paula Carbone for the second season.

=== Filming ===
Filming for the first season took place on location in Vancouver, British Columbia, from August 20, 2018, to November 20, 2018. Filming for the second season was expected to begin on March 2, 2020, and conclude on June 9, 2020, but was put on hold due to the COVID-19 pandemic. Filming for the second season resumed on August 28, 2020, and was scheduled to conclude on November 24, 2020. Filming was delayed once again and instead concluded in December of that year.

== Reception ==
Review aggregator website Rotten Tomatoes reports that 6% of 18 critic ratings are positive for Season 1. The website's consensus reads, "A hodgepodge of science fiction homage, Another Life lacks the distinctive spark necessary to set it apart from the array of stories it aspires to be". Season 2 has only four critic ratings on Rotten Tomatoes, one short of the minimum five necessary for a score or consensus, but three out of four reviews are negative. Metacritic calculated an average score of 33 out of 100, based on 8 reviews, citing "generally unfavorable reviews".
