= Zone 414 =

2021 American film by Andrew Baird

- Poster
- Directed by: Andrew Baird
- Written by: Bryan Edward Hill
- Produced by: Martin Brennan; Jib Polhemus; Deborah Shaw-Kolar; Andrew Baird
- Starring: Guy Pearce; Matilda Lutz; Jonathan Aris; Travis Fimmel
- Cinematography: James Mather
- Edited by: Tony Cranstoun
- Music by: Raffertie
- Production companies: Highland Film Group; El Ride Productions; Northern Ireland Screen; 23ten Productions; Source Management + Production; Bairdfilm; Great Point Media
- Distributed by: Saban Films
- Release date: September 3, 2021
- Running time: 99 minutes
- Country: United States
- Language: English
- Budget: $5 million

Zone 414 is a 2021 American tech noir thriller film directed by Andrew Baird in his feature-film debut, and written by Bryan Edward Hill. It stars Guy Pearce, Matilda Lutz, Jonathan Aris and Travis Fimmel. The film is about a wealthy robot designer who hires a private investigator to find his adult daughter, who goes missing inside a walled city where humans can hire humanoid robots for sexual pleasure.

It was released in the United States by Saban Films on September 3, 2021.

== Synopsis ==
Zone 414 is a walled city of state-of-the-art androids, humanoid robots which cater to wealthy clients, providing companionship and sex. The Zone is run by a corporation owned by the androids' inventor, Marlon Veidt, and his brother, the psychologist Joseph Veidt. Marlon realizes that his adult daughter Melissa has gone missing inside Zone 414. He hires private investigator David Carmichael to bring her home. David is a former police detective who was forced to retire after he caused the death of his police partner and a criminal during a hostage situation. He is also a recovering alcoholic who is troubled by his wife's suicide.

The Veidt Corporation tests David by asking him to shoot a woman who pleads for her life. He deduces that she must be a lifelike android and shoots her, passing the test. Joseph Veidt then interviews and psychologically profiles David to see if he is suitable for the job, which requires discretion and a willingness to work outside of the law. When he passes both tests, he meets Marlon, who describes his assignment. He wants David to find Melissa without involving the police, fearing that news of a missing person in Zone 414 might lead to a crackdown on the zone's regulatory exemptions.

David pairs up with Jane, a highly advanced and self-aware robot, to find Melissa. Jane has developed human-like emotions that transcend the simulated emotions required in her work as a prostitute. She tells David that a man is leaving threatening messages for her. Believing herself to be the target of a stalker, she has become afraid for her safety.

David meets Royale, the pimp who helps wealthy clients select a robot to cater to their sexual needs. He asks her if some wealthy clients are paying to be able to threaten robots like Jane, but Royale denies that she would comply with such a request. He asks her about Melissa, and she says that she was hanging out at a gritty part of the city, pretending to be a robot.

As Jane continues to face threats from her stalker, the pair discover Melissa hanging by a noose in an empty warehouse in a boatyard. David returns the body to Marlon and suggests that the authorities be alerted to Zone 414's dangers. When David meets Joseph Veidt to receive his payment, David goads the psychologist into admitting that he was stalking Jane. He tells David that when Melissa caught him torturing and killing androids, he killed her. Soon after, Joseph arrives at Jane's apartment and attempts to immobilize her with a handheld device. Jane is momentarily frozen, but regains mobility and overpowers Joseph. When David returns to see Jane, he offers his gun to her and she fatally shoots Joseph.

Marlon Veidt is seen making adjustments to an android that looks exactly like Melissa, implying that he is replacing his real daughter with an android replica in his grief. The Veidt Corporation presses David to record a statement claiming that Zone 414 is safe, and threaten him with legal action if he criticizes the android city. As part of the deal for David to keep silent, Marlon lets Jane leave the Zone. In the final scene, David meets her outside Zone 414 with papers which allow her to live in the outside world.

== Cast ==
- Guy Pearce as David Carmichael, a retired police detective working as a private investigator
- Matilda Lutz as Jane, an advanced, self-aware robot prostitute
- Jonathan Aris as Joseph Veidt, brother of Marlon and uncle of Melissa
- Colin Salmon as Hawthorne, a wealthy client seeking to purchase a lifelike AI robot
- Jóhannes Haukur Jóhannesson as Mr. Russell, Jane's client
- Ned Dennehy as George, a human living at the fringe of Zone 414
- Olwen Fouéré as Royale, a pimp who helps wealthy clients select pleasure robots
- Antonia Campbell-Hughes as Jaden, George's female model android
- Fionnula Flanagan as Jane's maintenance provider
- Travis Fimmel as Marlon Veidt, a wealthy robot inventor and owner of Veidt corporation

Holly Demaine and Jorin Cooke also briefly appear as Melissa Veidt and Hamilton, respectively.

== Production ==
On August 28, 2019, it was announced that Travis Fimmel would play the lead role. On January 21, 2020, Guy Pearce and Matilda Lutz joined the cast, with Pearce replacing Fimmel, who took a supporting role instead.

Principal photography took place between February 6 and February 29, 2020 in Northern Ireland.

== Release ==
The film was released in US theaters and on VOD on September 3, 2021 by Saban Films. Netflix began streaming it on January 1, 2022.

== Reception ==
On the review aggregator website Rotten Tomatoes, 17% of 23 critics' reviews are positive, with an average rating of 4.1/10. The website's consensus reads: "Zone 414 wastes a game Guy Pearce while ill-advisedly begging comparisons with numerous superior sci-fi thrillers." Metacritic, which uses a weighted average, assigned the film a score of 36 out of 100, based on 4 critics, indicating "generally unfavorable" reviews.

Cath Clarke from The Guardian gave it two out of five stars and called it a "hollow Blade Runner copycat" in which the script is "completely devoid of ideas about what the future of AI might look like." Todd Gilchrist from What to Watch says that while "Director Andrew Baird deserves credit for nakedly aping one of sci-fi's most famous films,... he can't recreate its style or storytelling". Gilchrist states that the "'malfunctioning' android Jane" character (Matilda Lutz) has "lackluster dialogue", and noted that her character had "some interesting dimensions the movie needed to explore better". He criticized screenwriter Bryan Edward Hill for "front-load[ing] the film with too many ideas and references that its director, and its budget, cannot deliver [on]."
