= F*** Marry Kill =

2025 film by Laura Murphy

- Release poster
- Directed by: Laura Murphy
- Written by: Ivan Diaz; Dan Scheinkman; Meghan Brown
- Produced by: Richard Alan Reid; Michael Philip; Jason Moring
- Starring: Lucy Hale; Virginia Gardner; Brooke Nevin
- Cinematography: Jonathan Hall
- Edited by: John Cason
- Music by: Corey Wallace
- Production company: BuzzFeed Studios
- Distributed by: Lionsgate Premiere
- Release date: March 7, 2025
- Running time: 97 minutes
- Country: United States
- Language: English

F*** Marry Kill is a 2025 American comedy thriller film set in Colorado, directed by Laura Murphy and starring Lucy Hale, Virginia Gardner, and Brooke Nevin.

The plot revolves around true-crime junkie Eva Vaughn who, upon reaching 30 and being single, uses a dating app and finds three different love interests, one of them she fears might be the serial killer targeting women on dating apps. She initially playfully tries to decide which of the three is a f-boy, marriage material, or would kill.

The film was released in the United States on March 7, 2025, by Lionsgate Premiere to polarized reviews.

== Plot ==
In Boulder, Colorado, the serial killer known as the Swipe Right Killer has been targeting women on dating apps. According to the true-crime podcast Mark My Murder, the killer has left no fingerprints and is believed to have an interest in forensics and a penchant for rosé. Eva Vaughn, an avid listener of the podcast, celebrates her 30th birthday with her best friends Kelly, Robin, and Anthony. She has been recently dumped by Jake, her police officer boyfriend of eight years.

Later that night, Eva's overprotective older sister Valerie gifts her a home security system and reveals that Jake is engaged to a fellow police officer. Eva then creates a dating profile and matches with various men, including Kyle, a former middle school classmate, and Mitch, whom she meets at the bar he owns. She learns that Mitch does not have fingerprints due to a kitchen accident. She then catches Valerie spying on her at the bar. Out of spite, Eva takes Mitch home and they have sex.

The next morning, Norman, a security company employee, arrives at Eva's house for an evaluation. He reveals he is taking night classes in forensics before asking her out on a date, which she accepts. Eva later goes on an awkward first date with Kyle, who orders a bottle of rosé. He invites her to continue their date back at his place, but she declines and instead meets Mitch again for sex.

Eva's friends and Valerie realize that each of her three suitors has something in common with the Swipe Right Killer. A new murder reveals that the killer wears size 10 shoes, prompting Eva to start an investigation. As they go on another date, Mitch becomes upset when Eva reveals she has been seeing other men; she leaves after discovering that his shoe size is 10. The next day, Kyle takes Eva on a picnic in the park, during which he attacks a man playing guitar, and she finds that his shoe size is also 10.

After Norman installs Eva's security system, they go on a date, but he leaves suddenly after receiving a phone call from his sister. Eva and Robin follow him and see him leaving a house with plastic bags. They enter the house and find Norman's sister Lila, a wheelchair user, who explains that Norman was taking out the trash.

Norman invites Eva over to his house and apologizes for leaving abruptly. Eva notices that he wears size 10 shoes and finds a single woman's shoe. When she inadvertently reveals she knows his sister uses a wheelchair, tensions arise so she leaves.

At the police station, Eva shares her suspicions about Norman with Jake, who discloses that the killer has been collecting one shoe from each victim. Eva returns to Norman's house and surreptitiously collects samples of his DNA, which she turns over to Jake. Norman later visits Eva, concerned by her odd behavior, but she orders him to leave by threatening to call the police.

Unable to contact Valerie or her friends, Eva asks Kyle if she can stay at his place, as Norman had installed her home security system. While at Kyle's, she receives a voicemail from Valerie saying that Kyle is married and lied about his profession. He berates Eva for refusing him sex, and as a struggle ensues, Kelly appears and fatally stabs Kyle.

In Kelly's car, Eva finds several phones belonging to Swipe Right Killer victims. Kelly explains that after discovering that her husband Brad was cheating on her, she killed his mistress. She subsequently began catfishing and killing potential homewreckers while wearing Brad's shoes, intending to frame him for the murders. When Kelly lunges at Eva with a knife, Eva stabs her in the back with another victim's stiletto heel. The police arrive after Valerie, who had installed a tracking app on Kelly's phone, called Jake.

Eva apologizes to Norman for the recent misunderstandings, and they resume dating. Some time later, Eva is now the author of a best-selling crime novel and a co-host on Mark My Murder. During a live episode, Kelly calls her from prison.

== Cast ==
- Lucy Hale as Eva Vaughn
- Virginia Gardner as Kelly
- Brooke Nevin as Valerie
- Samer Salem as Norman
- Bethany Brown as Robin
- Jedidiah Goodacre as Kyle
- Brendan Morgan as Mitch
- JayR Tinaco as Anthony
- R. J. Fetherstonhaugh (credited as R. J. Featherstone) as Jake
- Threnody Tsai as Lila
- Edem Nyamadi as Brad
- Laura Yenga as Winnie

== Production ==
The film is directed by Laura Murphy, from a screenplay by Ivan Diaz and Meghan Brown. It is produced by BuzzFeed Inc.'s Richard Alan Reid, Michael Philip, and Jason Moring. Principal photography took place in Kelowna, British Columbia, Canada, and was completed in early 2023.

== Release ==
F*** Marry Kill was initially scheduled to be given a simultaneous release in select theaters in the United States and on video on demand on December 6, 2024. Weeks prior to its release, Lionsgate postponed the film's domestic release to March 7, 2025, to coincide with its international releases. However, digital stores and PVOD platforms were not informed about this change, leading to the film being made available on its initial release date before being promptly pulled hours later.

== Reception ==
On the review aggregator website Rotten Tomatoes, 50% of 16 critics' reviews are positive, with an average rating of 5.2/10.
