= Sunrise (2024 film) =

Film by Andrew Baird

- Theatrical release poster
- Directed by: Andrew Baird
- Screenplay by: Ronan Blaney
- Produced by: Martin Brennan; Jib Polhemus; Nathan Klingher; Ford Corbett
- Starring: Alex Pettyfer; Crystal Yu; William Gao; Kurt Yaeger; Olwen Fouéré; Guy Pearce
- Cinematography: Ivan Abel
- Edited by: Helen Sheridan; John Walters
- Music by: Andrew Simon McAllister
- Production companies: Grindstone Entertainment Group; 23ten; Source Management + Production; Northern Ireland Screen
- Distributed by: Lionsgate (United States); Altitude Film Distribution (United Kingdom)
- Release date: January 19, 2024
- Running time: 94 minutes
- Countries: United States; United Kingdom
- Language: English
- Box office: $19,202

Sunrise is a 2024 horror film directed by Andrew Baird and written by Ronan Blaney. It stars Alex Pettyfer, Crystal Yu, William Gao, Kurt Yaeger, Olwen Fouéré, and Guy Pearce.

Sunrise was released in theaters and digitally in North America on January 19, 2024.

== Synopsis ==
A rural town, in the forests of the Pacific Northwest, is plagued by a vampire. He was a former cop named Fallon, and the residents discover the dark visitor is really a vampire who feeds on blood and fear. He becomes a friend to an immigrant family, and soon faces a choice of revenge or redemption.

== Cast ==
- Alex Pettyfer as Fallon
- Crystal Yu as Yan Loi
- William Gao as Edward Loi
- Olwen Fouéré as Ma Reynolds
- Kurt Yaeger as Dee Gillespie
- Lalor Roddy as Lennox
- Guy Pearce as Reynolds

== Production ==
Sunrise was directed by Andrew Baird from a screenplay by Ronan Blaney. It was produced by Martin Brennan, Jib Polhemus, Nathan Klingher and Ford Corbett. Alex Pettyfer and Kurt Yaeger executive produced and also stars in the film. Principal photography took place in Belfast, Northern Ireland from February 6 to March 22, 2023.

== Release ==
The Solution Entertainment Group handled sales for the project at the European Film Market. Sunrise premiered in limited theatres and on digital platforms by Lionsgate in the United States on January 19, 2024.

== Reception ==
On the review aggregator website Rotten Tomatoes, 41% of 17 critics' reviews are positive, with an average rating of 4.4/10.

=== Box office ===
As of April 7, 2024, Sunrise grossed $19,202 in Russia.
