= The Substance (soundtrack) =

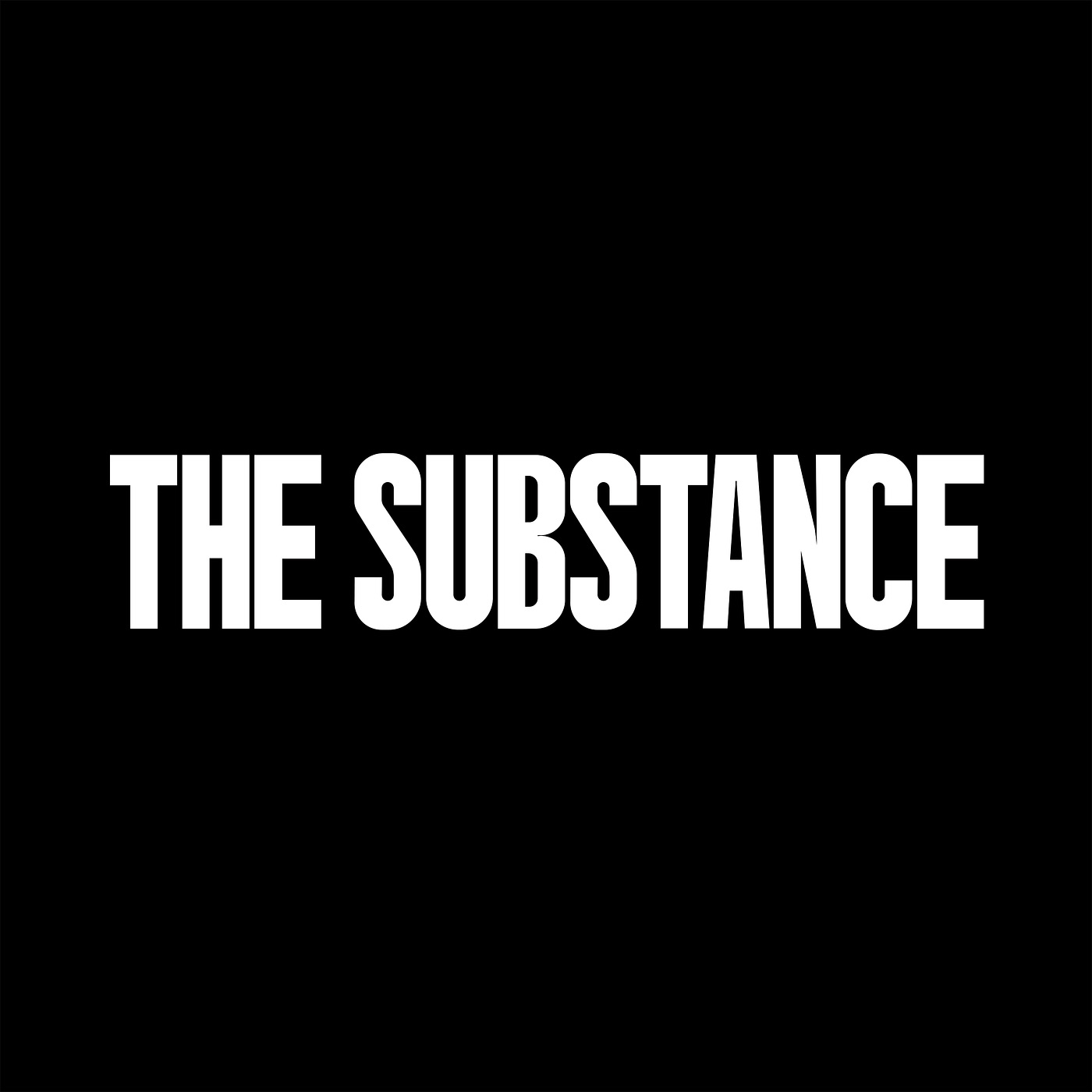

Film score by Raffertie
- Released: September 20, 2024
- Recorded: 2024
- Genre: Electronic; film score; pop
- Length: 41:20
- Label: Waxwork Records
- Producer: Raffertie

Raffertie chronology
The Continental: From the World of John Wick (2023)	The Substance (2024)

The Substance is the film score soundtrack to the 2024 film of the same name directed by Coralie Fargeat and stars Demi Moore, Margaret Qualley and Dennis Quaid. The album consisted of 28 tracks from the original score composed by Raffertie beginning early 2024 and utilized electronic and pop music. The album was released through Waxwork Records digitally on September 20, 2024, followed by a vinyl edition that became available for pre-order on the same date. The score was positively received by critics.

== Background ==
=== Original score ===
British composer and record producer Raffertie (Note: Stage name for Benjamin Stefanski) was assigned to compose the musical score for The Substance. Raffertie was involved in the project around January 2024, late into the film's post-production. Since the film was scheduled for the 2024 Cannes Film Festival premiere in May, Raffertie was tasked to complete the score within two months. Fargeat hired Raffertie after he composed five to six tracks on the reel she sent as a sample. Interested in an electronic score, Fargeat cited the "electronic kind of violence and roughness" in his music, as well as his ability to create sensitive, emotional pieces. Her early conversations with Raffertie included focusing on the duality of Eliasbeth and Sue, where the latter provided an organic, nostalgic feel for Elisabeth's music and a synthetic and contemporary quality for Sue's music. She referenced Bernard Herrmann's works, notably Citizen Kane (1941) as the genesis for Elisabeth's music.

The titular piece "The Substance" had a club, techno-leaning feel which needed the "sensual, slightly dark" underlying theme for Sue's and the genre worked well for the character. When he witnessed the rough edit of the film, he realized that silence was considered a key aspect of the score, identifying moments where the music underlines the action. He was pleased about, how the sound design and music fits well together, and that he liked the interplay between these two things.

For the activation scene, Raffertie and Fargeat discussed on the specific music he needed to add, which combines silence and noise that begins with a slower and noisy feel, as Elisabeth injects herself with the drug and as she stares at herself in the mirror again and falls to the floor, ending with silence. The sequence where Sue introduces herself first time at an audition to replace Elisabeth on the television show, had impressed Raffertie where he began with a bass loop, and kick drum, followed by a noisy snare drum that blended well in that sequence.

Due to time constraints and the distance between London and France, Raffertie and Fargeat worked remotely over Zoom, first meeting in person at the premiere.

=== Additional music ===
For the scene where Monstro Elisasue puts on her earrings, the film uses "The Nightmare And Dawn" from the Vertigo soundtrack. This was initially used as a temp track prior to Raffertie's involvement. Fargeat wanted something that was "princess related" with a "kind of sweetness"; she initially tried various classical pieces and music from the Disney animated feature Cinderella but didn't like the results. She felt that "The Nightmare And Dawn" worked on a meta level, referencing its connotations with the star system. After Raffertie joined the film, he tried to compose original music for the scene but ultimately agreed that the temp track was superior.

Additional songs featured in the film include "Pump It Up!" by DJ Endor (a remix of the Belgian musician Danzel's song), "At Last" (sweetened version) performed by Etta James, "Ugly and Vengeful" by Anna von Hausswolff, and Richard Strauss' tone poem Also sprach Zarathustra, notably featured in Stanley Kubrick's 2001: A Space Odyssey (1968). The film also credits "Fade Away" by Pyrit, "Lost Soul" by Holy Fuck & Lucia Tacchetti, "Aerotronic" by Romanger, and "Wall Street", "The Punishment Song", "Manouba", and "Ending Blast", by Youssef Chebbi & Valentin Féron. (Note: As denoted in the film credits.)

== Release ==
The soundtrack to The Substance was marketed by the American independent record label Waxwork Records; it was released through digital download on September 20, 2024. Waxwork further published the album in an "Activator Green" colored 180-gram vinyl LP available for pre-order on September 20. The packaging of the vinyl edition included a printed inner sleeve and heavyweight jacket wrapped in a custom printed Kraft paper card. The album cover for the digital edition included a plain text of the film's title covered in a black background and white text color, except for the YouTube Music version had an inverted color.

== Reception ==
Monica Castillo of RogerEbert.com wrote that Raffertie's "catchy and propulsive beats make the movie feel like it's speeding past traffic on the 405." Lovia Gyarkye of The Hollywood Reporter wrote "The British composer Raffertie's thunderous score adds an appropriately ominous touch, especially during moments of corporeal mutilation." Logan Thompson of The Ithacan described it as a "thrilling bass-boosted pop score".

== Track listing ==
No.	Title	Length
1.	"Elizabeth Sparkle"	1:59
2.	"The Substance"	2:30
3.	"Change of Heart | I'd Like To"	1:51
4.	"Only | Byron"	1:44
5.	"Activation"	4:10
6.	"You Stabilise Everyday"	1:26
7.	"Apartment"	0:41
8.	"Home Improvement"	0:28
9.	"Nose Bleed"	1:37
10.	"Zip"	0:21
11.	"Alteration"	1:21
12.	"Followed"	0:19
13.	"Red Dress"	1:00
14.	"Make Up"	1:03
15.	"French Cuisine"	4:13
16.	"Control Yourself"	1:20
17.	"Golem"	0:45
18.	"Your Final Kit"	1:38
19.	"They Are Going to Love You"	0:30
20.	"I Hate Myself"	3:43
21.	"Single Use"	1:41
22.	"Everything in the Right Place"	1:03
23.	"Monstro"	0:13
24.	"On Air"	0:41
25.	"Shoot the Monster"	1:37
26.	"Blood"	1:11
27.	"More Blood"	0:22
28.	"Pirouette"	1:53
Total length:		41:20

== Release history ==
Region	Date	Format(s)	Label(s)	Ref.
Various	September 20, 2024	Digital download; streaming	Waxwork Records	
Various	September 20, 2024	Vinyl LP (pre-order)	Waxwork Records	

== Accolades ==
Award	Date of ceremony	Category	Recipient(s)	Result	Ref.
Hollywood Music in Media Awards	November 20, 2024	Best Original Score – Horror/Thriller Film	Raffertie	Nominated	
Indiana Film Journalists Association	December 16, 2024	Best Musical Score	Raffertie	Nominated	
Ivor Novello Awards	May 22, 2025	Best Original Film Score	Raffertie	Won	
