= Danny Maseng =

Israeli-born performer (born 1950)

- דני מסנג
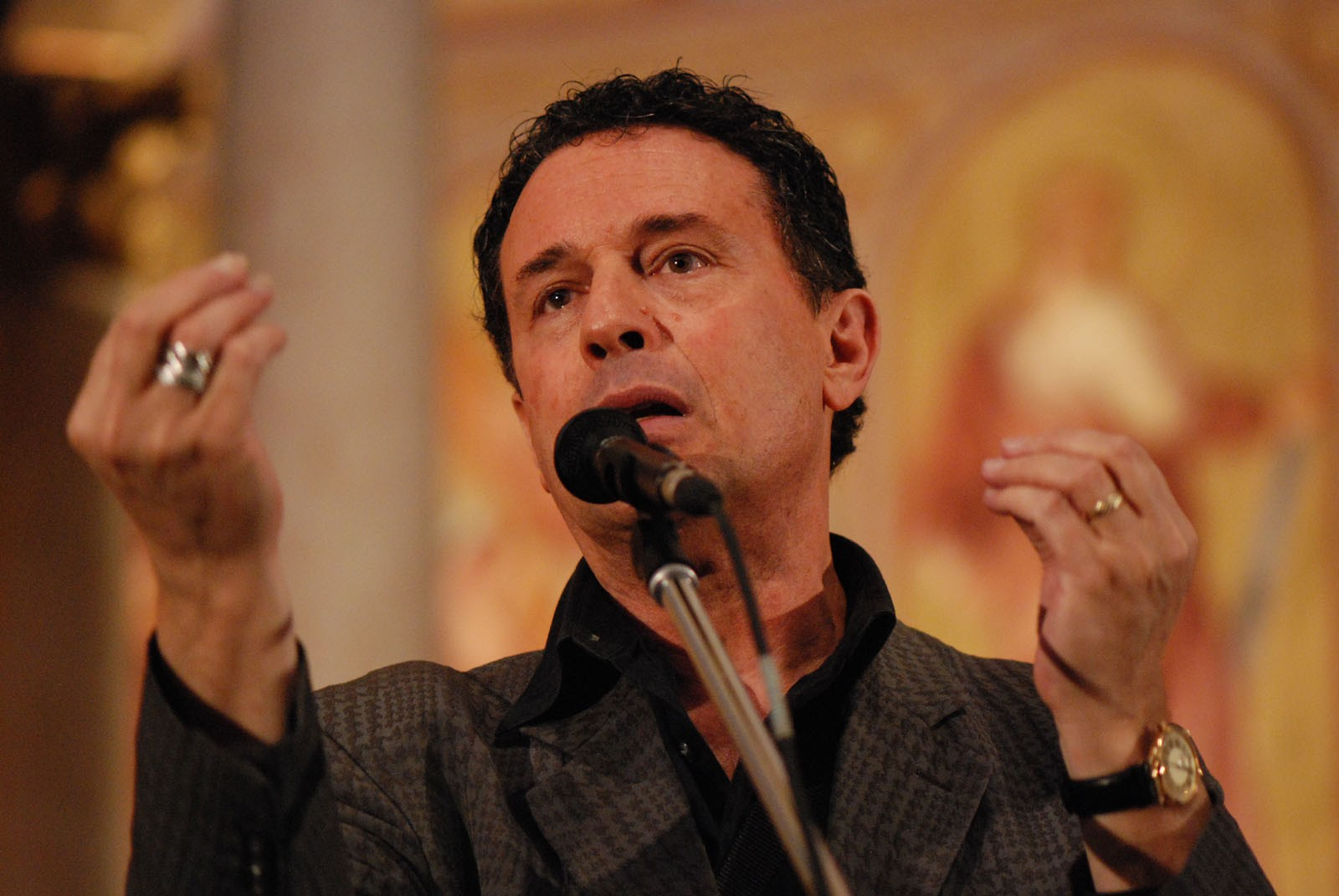
- Danny Maseng in Concert, Potsdam
- Born: 1950 (age 75–76); Tel Aviv, Israel
- Known for: Jewish Liturgical music
- Website: dannymaseng.com

Don Tourliev "Danny" Maseng (Hebrew: דני מסנג; born in 1950) is an Israeli-born performer. An actor, singer and writer, Maseng is known as a composer of contemporary Jewish Liturgical music. He currently leads MAKOM LA, a spiritual community in Los Angeles, California.

== Biography ==
Maseng was born in Tel Aviv, Israel to Norwegian-American pilot Trygve Johannes Maseng and American-born Eve Davidowitz. Maseng's father, Trygve, arrived in Israel as a volunteer for the Air Force during the 1948 Arab–Israeli War. While serving, he met Maseng's mother, Eve and Trygve converted to Judaism before the two wed in 1949. Maseng's mother was born in Philadelphia to Ida B. Davidowitz and Conservative rabbi Harry Solomon Davidowitz. In 1934 when Eve was 7 years old, the family immigrated to pre-state Israel and settled in Tel Aviv. Maseng has described his family as creative stating "everyone was an artist, philosopher or a professor."

Maseng rose to stardom in Israel at a young age and was the star of one of the first TV shows in Israel. Maseng came to America in 1971 to star on Broadway in the musical Only Fools are Sad under the patronage of Golda Meir.

After his Broadway run, Maseng remained in the States, living in several cities before becoming a practicing Buddhist and student of the late Dainin Katagiri in Minneapolis. He later found his way back to Judaism and became involved in the Reform Judaism movement through the Olin Sang Ruby Union Institute, where he ran the Tiferet Arts program for eight years.

Maseng resides with his wife in Los Angeles, California. He has three sons, Jonathan, Carmel and Jordan.

== Theater, music and television career ==
Maseng directed and starred in productions in Minneapolis, including Cold Storage and The Day they Shot John Lennon for the Genesis Theater; The Secret Rapture; the Minnesota Opera's production of Carousel; and the Ron Hutchinson play Rat in the Skull with British Actor Richard Lumsden for the Theater Exchange.

After returning to New York in the early 1990s, Maseng had roles in the Circle Repertory Company's production of A Body of Water and starred as Manasseh Da Costa ("King of Schnorrers") in the revival of the Broadway Musical King of Schnorrers in Los Angeles at the then "Westwood" now Geffen Playhouse.

In 1995, Maseng debuted his critically acclaimed one man show Wasting Time with Harry Davidowitz at the John Houseman Theater off-broadway, where it enjoyed a long run and has since toured with it abroad.

Maseng has released a dozen albums and appeared as a guest star on numerous television shows including many of the shows in the Law & Order franchise, Wild Discovery and One Life to Live; and has also done extensive voice-over work for JoS. A. Bank, American Express, Hewlett Packard and Hoehn Motors.

Maseng's setting of "Elohai N'tzor" was covered by Pink Martini on their 2010 Album Joy to the World (Pink Martini album).

== Jewish career ==
In addition to his performing and composing, Maseng helped found and run the Steven Spielberg Theater Fellowships for the Foundation for Jewish Camp and also served as the Artistic Director of the Brandeis-Bardin Institute in California. He was also the founding director of the Jewish Arts Institute, a program run out of the Isabella Freedman Jewish Retreat Center in Falls Village, Connecticut.

Maseng ran the Hava Nashira Jewish Songleader's institute for several years, where he worked closely with Debbie Friedman, Craig Taubman, and other prominent Jewish musicians.

For several years, Maseng served as the spiritual leader for Congregation Agudas Achim in Livingston Manor, New York. He later served as the Artist-In-Residence/Cantor for Temple Israel of Columbus in Ohio. Maseng served as the Chazzan and Music Director of Temple Israel of Hollywood from 2008-2015.

In 2007, Maseng was appointed the Patron Artist of the Jewish Institute of Cantorial Arts at the University of Potsdam in Germany, the first cantorial school in Germany since the Holocaust.

Maseng has been involved in many interfaith and peace efforts. In 2008 he performed in honor of Prince Hassan bin Talal at the Abraham Geiger award ceremony in Germany. He has also been a supporter of J Street, the liberal Jewish advocacy group that seeks a peaceful end to the Israeli-Palestinian conflict.

In 2015 Maseng founded MAKOM LA, a spiritual community in Los Angeles, CA.

== Partial discography ==
- Beyond the Gates - 2014
- Heaven on Earth - 2010
- Just Like Home (With Michael Skloff) - 2008
- Yedid Nefesh - 2004
- Labor of Love - 2002
- Tapuach Zahav (Reissue: Hataklit Records) - 2001
- Soul on Fire - 2000
- Wasting Time With Harry Davidowitz - 1996
- Songs for the Sabbath (SISU) - 1995
- On Silver Wings - 1982
- Danny Maseng: First Edition (ACUM Records) - 1975

== Compilations ==
- Danny Maseng Retrospective (Hataklit Records) - 2014
- Immersed: Music for Mayyim Hayyim - 2007
- Celebrate Shabbat (Craig N Co) - 2006
- American Jewish Summer (Jewish Music Group) - 2006
- Mitzvah Music - 2005
- Shabbat Anthology: Volume One (Transcontinental) - 2003
- Kol Dodi: Jewish Music for Weddings (URJ) - 2002
- Ruach 5761: New Jewish Tunes (Transcontinental) - 2001
- Israel Our Homeland: The First Songs (ACUM) -1981
- The Songs of Israel (ACUM) - 1980

== Partial filmography ==
- Above and Beyond (2014) Segment on DVD Extras
- The Other Men in Black (2013)
- Hava Nagila: The Movie (2012)
- Blessed Is the Match: The Life and Death of Hannah Senesh (2008)
- Law & Order: Criminal Intent (2002) 1 Episode
- Law & Order: SVU (1999-2001) 2 Episodes
- Deadline (2000 TV series) (2000) 1 Episode
- Law & Order (1993-2000) 3 Episodes
- Prince Street (1997) 1 Episode
- Muhammad Ali: The Whole Story (1996)
- Wildest Africa (1995)
- One Life to Live (1994)
