= Temple Israel of Hollywood =

Reform Jewish synagogue in Los Angeles, California, US

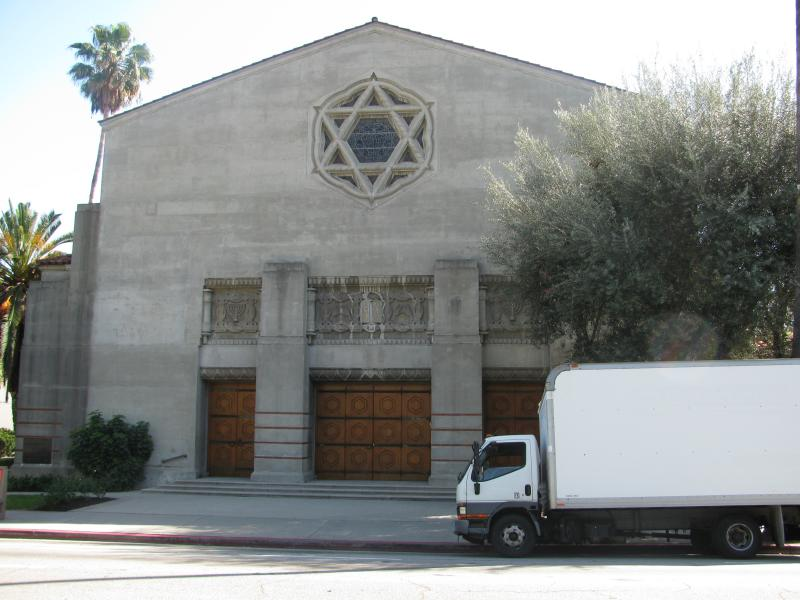
- The synagogue building, in 2009

- Location in Los Angeles, California

Religion
- Affiliation: Reform Judaism
- Ecclesiastical or organizational status: Synagogue
- Leadership: Rabbi Mari Chernow
- Status: Active

Location
- Location: Hollywood Boulevard, Hollywood, Los Angeles, California
- Country: United States
- Interactive map of Temple Israel of Hollywood
- Coordinates: 34°6′5″N 118°20′57″W

Architecture
- Architects: Samuel E. Lunden; S. Charles Lee
- Type: Synagogue architecture
- Established: 1926 (as a congregation)
- Completed: 1948

Website
- tioh.org

Temple Israel of Hollywood is a Reform Jewish congregation and synagogue, located in Hollywood, Los Angeles, California, in the United States. Founded in 1926, the congregation initially held services in the Hayakawa Mansion before the first Temple Israel building was established on Ivar Street under the leadership of Rabbi Isadore Isaacson. Temple Israel moved to its current location on Hollywood Boulevard in 1948. It has traditionally had a large number of film actors, writers, directors and producers as members. It is currently led by Senior Rabbi Mari Chernow.

== History ==
Temple Israel was founded in 1926 by seven men, five of whom were prominent in the film industry, including Sol M. Wurtzel, Isadore Bernstein, and Edward Laemmle. They wanted to fill the need for social services and a house of worship for the Hollywood Jewish community. A former church on Ivar Street was purchased, and served the Temple over the next two decades before the size of the congregation necessitated a larger building.

The current temple was built in 1948 and has been expanded several times. It was designed by architects Samuel E. Lunden, who also designed the Los Angeles Stock Exchange Building and interior of the St. Vincent de Paul Church and S. Charles Lee, the designer of the Hollywood Melrose Hotel and Tower Theatre. At the temple's dedication ceremony, a small orchestra played Poem Ancien, composed by Alexander Borisoff for cello and narrator. Edward G. Robinson narrated at the ceremony.

Shortly after its founding, the Temple began staging its Midnight Show, a fundraiser that over the years saw such stars as Benny Rubin, Lucille Ball, Al Jolson, Eddie Cantor, Jack Benny, Milton Berle, Frank Sinatra, Judy Garland, Shirley MacLaine, and Lena Horne perform on behalf of the Temple.

Rabbi Max Nussbaum served as Rabbi from 1943, until his death in 1974, after Rabbi Morton Bauman left to serve in World War II. Cantor Saul Silverman served alongside Nussbaum, and served the Temple for over 39 years. During Nussbaum's tenure Temple Israel established itself as a great friend of Israel, raising large sums for the fledgling state. Many famous speakers were also brought in to speak before the congregation including Rabbis Mordechai Kaplan, Leo Baeck, and Stephen S. Wise. Harry Belafonte, Leon Uris, and Theodore Bikel also spoke before the congregation; and in 1965 Martin Luther King Jr. gave a rousing speech from the bima.

After the death of Rabbi Nussbaum, Rabbi Haskell Bernat led the congregation. Cantor Aviva Rosenbloom came to the Temple at the same time and would serve as Cantor for over 30 years. After Rabbi Daniel Polish served a short term as senior Rabbi, Rabbi John Rosove led the Congregation in 1988 until 2019.

Danny Maseng, a prominent composer and singer, served as chazzan from 2008 to 2015.

In January 2015, the Temple celebrated the 50th Anniversary of Martin Luther King, Jr.'s visit with a celebratory evening featuring speeches from Los Angeles Mayor Eric Garcetti and talk show host and author Tavis Smiley.

Rabbi Mari Chernow was appointed as the congregation's first female senior rabbi in July 2021.

In October 1957 the Temple acquired and commenced operating the Hillside Memorial Park Cemetery.

== Trivia ==
- The Temple's sanctuary lamp was donated by Hal Wallis, producer of Casablanca and True Grit.
- Henry Diskay, who sang Kol Nidre in The Jazz Singer, served as cantorial soloist in the 1930s.
- Rabbi Nussbaum rescued a small Torah on Kristallnacht that now resides in the Temple's Torah ark.
- Tony Curtis crowned the Purim Carnival Queen in 1952.
- Marlon Brando and Bob Dylan attended Passover Seder at the Temple in 1975.
- In 1996 the Temple began Chesed Day and by 1999 it was known as Mitzvah Day. Today it's called Big Sunday and is a citywide event.
- The frieze over the front doors contains two pairs of hands making the sign of the Priestly Blessing. Boston childhood memories of the gesture inspired congregation member Leonard Nimoy to devise the Vulcan salute.

== Notable current and former members and congregants ==
- Frances Bay, actress
- Isadore Bernstein, screenwriter
- Jack Black, actor
- May Britt, actress
- Steve Broidy, film executive
- Aline Brosh McKenna, writer, director
- Eddie Cantor, singer, actor, comedian, and dancer
- Sammy Davis Jr., singer and dancer
- Lion Feuchtwanger, novelist
- Eddie Fisher, singer who once sang Kol Nidre on the High Holidays
- Gal Gadot, actress
- Martha Hyer, actress
- George Jessel, actor
- Al Jolson, singer, actor, and comedian
- Edward Laemmle, silent film director
- Osa Massen, actress
- Leonard Nimoy, actor
- Amanda Peet, actress
- Leon Schlesinger, film producer
- David O. Selznick, film producer
- Ben Stein, writer, lawyer, and actor
- Elizabeth Taylor, actress, who converted in the Temple in 1959
- Lea Thompson, actress, television director and producer
- Mike Todd, theatre and film producer
- Hal Wallis, film producer
- Sol Wurtzel, film producer
- Roger Kumble, director and writer
- Sacha Baron Cohen, comedian, actor, writer
- Matthew Weiner, writer, director, television producer.
- Ruth Kobart, actress
