= Elizabeth Ludlow =

American actress

- Born: 1988 or 1989 (age 37–38); Pittsburgh, Pennsylvania
- Education: Georgia State University
- Occupation: Actress
- Years active: 2013–present
- Known for: The Walking Dead (2016–2018); Peacemaker (2022–2025)

Elizabeth Ludlow (born 1988 or 1989) is an American actress known for her portrayal of Arat in the AMC postapocalyptic horror television series The Walking Dead (2016–2018); she is also known for her role as Mona in the USA Network TV series Satisfaction, and as Cas Isakovic in Another Life (2019-2021). She also appeared in Guardians of the Galaxy Vol. 2 and Peacemaker.

== Early life ==
Ludlow was born in Pittsburgh, Pennsylvania. She grew up in Savannah, Georgia, and was adopted as a child. Her adopted mother is from South Africa. She states the desire to act was inside her from an early age. Ludlow became involved with acting during her studies at Georgia State University, where she earned a degree in theatre. She chose doing this over playing soccer. Joining an acting troupe at the university opened the start of her career.

== Career ==
Ludlow began her career in 2013. She portrayed a girl in an episode of The Vampire Diaries television series. Since then, she has appeared in various television series, and subsequently Resurrection, Bound, Powers, Mr. Right, and Satisfaction.

In 2017, Ludlow appeared in the film Guardians of the Galaxy Vol. 2 as Easik Mother. In 2016, she portrayed Agent Kat Ryan in the film Max Steel, and also started a three season recurring role as Arat in the series The Walking Dead. In 2019, Ludlow joined the main cast of Another Life, which ran for two seasons before being canceled.

== Personal life ==
Ludlow is a member of the LGBT community and uses she/they pronouns.

== Filmography ==
=== Film ===
Year	Title	Role	Notes
2015	Mr. Right	Date	
2016	Max Steel	Agent Kat Ryan	
2017	Table 19	Caterer	
2017	Guardians of the Galaxy Vol. 2	Easik Mother	
2018	One Last Thing	Alex	
2019	Godzilla: King of the Monsters	First Lieutenant Griffin	
2022	Pursuit	Zoe Carter	
2022	Sam & Kate	Mary	

=== Television ===
Year	Title	Role	Notes
2013	The Vampire Diaries	Girl	Episode: "Death and the Maiden"
2014	Resurrection	Miss Lynch	Episode: "Multiple"
2015	Hindsight	Alice	Episode: "Square One"
2015	Powers	Up Rush	Episode: "You Are Not It"
2015	Satisfaction	Mona	Recurring role
2016	Halt and Catch Fire	Cavale	Episode: "Rules of Honorable Play"
2016–2018	The Walking Dead	Arat	Recurring role; 11 episodes
2018	The Resident	Cara Ramirez	Episode: "Pilot"
2019	NCIS: New Orleans	Frost	Episode: "The Terminator Conundrum"
2020	NCIS: Los Angeles	FBI Agent Mia Calvillo	Episode: "Watch Over Me"
2020	Equal	Stormé DeLarverie	Episode: "Stonewall: From Rebellion to Liberation"
2019–2021	Another Life	Cas Isakovic	Main role; 19 episodes
2022–2025	Peacemaker	Keeya Adebayo	Recurring role; 8 episodes

=== Video-Games ===
Year	Title	Role	Notes
2026	Gears of War: E-Day	Specialist Mags Carter	Voice role, likeness, & motion capture
