= Big Sunday =

Big Sunday is a 501(c)(3) nonprofit organization based in Los Angeles, California. Founded in 1999, it is responsible for an annual community service event in Los Angeles, also called "Big Sunday", which has grown from its beginnings as a "Mitzvah Day" at a local Jewish temple to become the largest such community service event in the United States.

== History ==
The idea behind Big Sunday began as "Mitzvah Day", a project motivated by the Jewish concept of "tikkun olam" (repairing the world), at Temple Israel of Hollywood, supervised by temple member (and Big Sunday founder and executive director) David Levinson. That event in 1999 had 200 volunteers, and has grown each year. It was renamed "Big Sunday" in 2003 to reflect the organization's secular and non-partisan openness.

In 2006, the event partnered with Los Angeles Mayor Antonio Villaraigosa to become an official city event, and reached 32,000 volunteers. Executive Director and Founder David Levinson was named California Nonprofit Leader of the Year at the inaugural Governor and First Lady's Medals for Service ceremony on June 22, 2009. In 2009, Big Sunday had over 50,000 volunteers participating in 500 projects around Southern California, including a neighborhood renovation project in Watts.
