= Samuel Anderson (actor) =

English actor

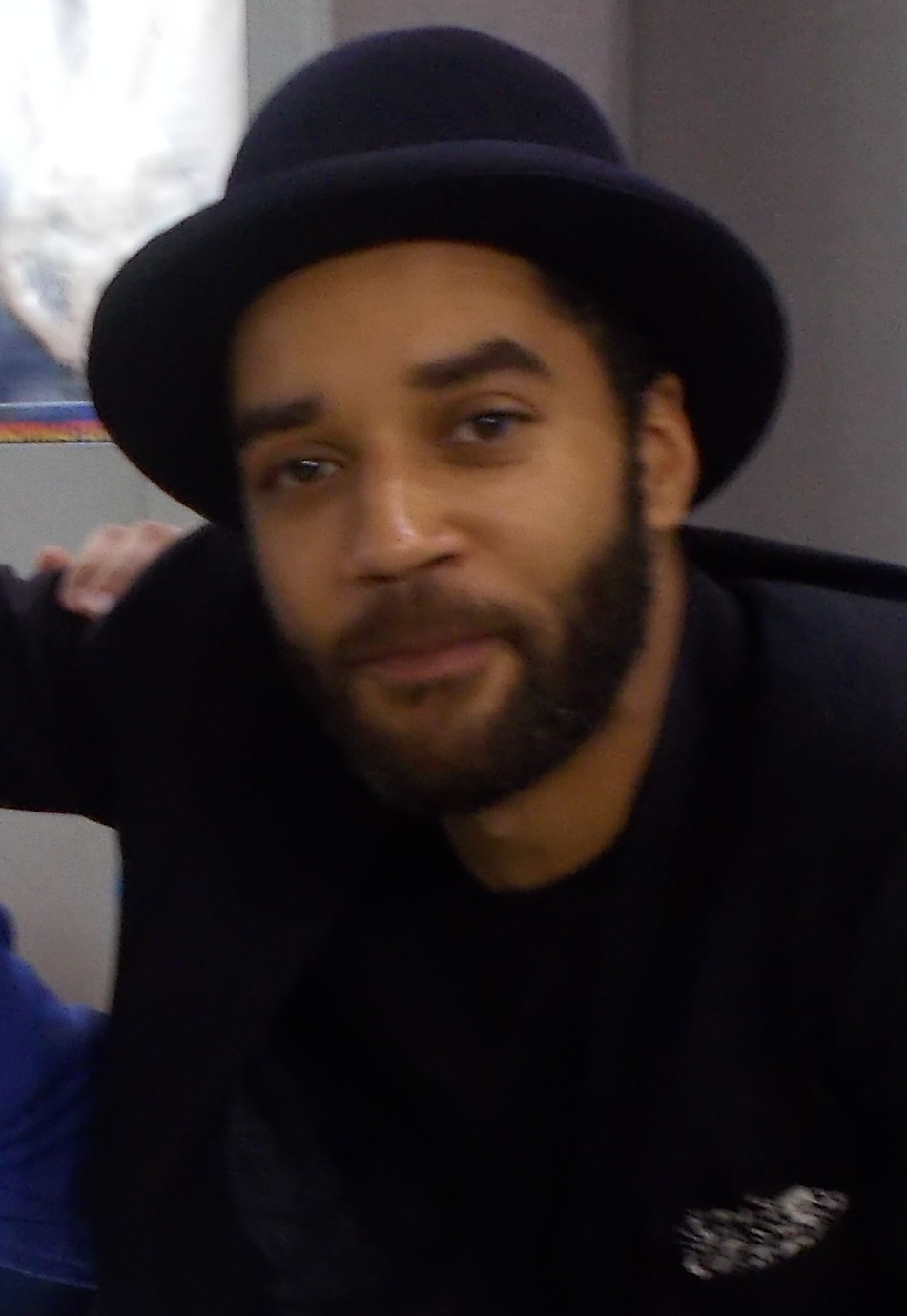
- Anderson at Bournemouth Comic-Con in 2015
- Born: 1982 (age 43–44); Handsworth, Birmingham, England
- Occupation: Actor
- Years active: 2003–present

Samuel Anderson (born 1982) is an English actor. He portrayed Crowther in the play The History Boys and its 2006 film adaptation. His other roles include Fingers in the BBC sitcom Gavin & Stacey (2007, 2009, 2024), Ross Kirk in the television soap opera Emmerdale (2007–2009), Danny Pink in the BBC sci-fi series Doctor Who (2014), Daniel in the Sky1 sitcom Trollied (2014–2017), William in the Netflix series Another Life (2021) and Mal in the comedy series Amandaland (2025–present).

== Early life ==
Anderson was born in Handsworth, Birmingham, to an Irish mother and Jamaican father. From early life, Anderson made it clear that he wished to pursue acting as a career. He attended Stuart Bathurst, a Catholic secondary school.

== Career ==
Anderson attended the Academy of Live and Recorded Arts in London before going on to originate the role of Crowther in the 2004 National Theatre production of Alan Bennett's play The History Boys. He subsequently performed the same role in the Broadway, Sydney, Wellington, and Hong Kong productions, and radio and film versions.

On television, Anderson has appeared in Hex for Sky One in 2004, and Totally Frank for Channel 4 from 2006 to 2007. In 2007, he appeared in the BBC Three comedy series Gavin & Stacey as recurring character Fingers. He made another appearance in the show in 2009 and in its 2024 Christmas special. He has also appeared in the BBC Four comedy film Stuck, and made various guest appearances in Doctors and Casualty on BBC One.

From October 2007, Anderson appeared in the ITV1 soap opera Emmerdale as Ross Kirk. His casting in the role was announced in September 2007, with Anderson stating that it was "great" to be joining "such a successful show". Emmerdale series producer Kathleen Beedles stated that Anderson was "a fantastic addition to the cast". Anderson remained a series regular in Emmerdale until January 2009, with major storylines including his character having an affair with Donna Windsor-Dingle and his wrongful imprisonment for the murder of Shane Doyle.

Anderson played Mr. Romantic in a Carte Noire coffee advertising campaign in 2011. He also featured in an advertising campaign for Ginsters in 2012. In February 2014, he had a small role in an episode of BBC drama series Death in Paradise. Also in February 2014, it was announced that Anderson had been cast as recurring character Danny Pink, a teacher at Coal Hill School, in the eighth series of Doctor Who, appearing in 11 episodes. Between 2014 and 2017, Anderson appeared in Sky1 sitcom Trollied, playing the role of Daniel. In February 2016, he appeared in the BBC One drama series Moving On. In 2017, he starred in the comedy Loaded on Channel 4.

He appeared as William in the Netflix science fiction series Another Life, which produced two seasons between 2019 and 2021, before being cancelled in February 2022.

He also appeared in Amandaland as Mal in 2025, which has been renewed for a second series.

== Filmography ==
=== Film ===
Year	Title	Role	Notes
2006	The History Boys	Crowther	
2009	Highlight	James	
2012	Betsy & Leonard	Dwayne	
2015	Pleasure Island	Nate	
2015	The Lady in the Van	Jehovah's Witness	
2018	Genesis	Robert Shorey	
2021	Gunpowder Milkshake	David	
2021	Sweetheart	Steve	
2023	Falling into Place	Lewis	
2023	Embers	Joe	
2024	Back to Black	A&R Man	

=== Television ===
Year	Title	Role	Notes
2003	Doctors	Tim Cartwright	2 episodes
2004	The Afternoon Play	Cashier / Receptionist	Episode: "Sons, Daughters and Lovers"
2004	Hex	Julius	Episode: "Pilot: The Story Begins"
2005–2006	Totally Frank	Jason	6 episodes
2007	Stuck	Simon	Television film
2007–2009	Emmerdale	Ross Kirk	Series regular
2007, 2009, 2024	Gavin & Stacey	Fingers	Recurring character
2009	Doctors	Gregg Wilcox	Episode: "A Little of What you Fancy"
2009	Casualty	Liam	Episode: "Palimpsest"
2011	Doctors	Roger Gently	Episode: "Lasso the Moon"
2011–2016	DCI Banks	DC Vince Grady	7 episodes
2012	Bedlam	Taylor	Episode: "Dare"
2012	Casualty	Kris Kingsley	3 episodes
2013	Midsomer Murders	Perry Stevens	Episode: "Death and the Divas"
2013	The Job Lot	Craig Allen	Episode #1.1
2014	Death in Paradise	Swimming Model	Episode: "The Early Bird"
2014	Doctor Who	Danny Pink	11 episodes
2014–2017	Trollied	Daniel Wilson	Series regular; 24 episodes
2016	Moving On	Danny	Episode: "Love"
2016–2018	Witless	Patrick	Main role
2017	Loaded	Leon	8 episodes
2019	Father Brown	Alan Tylett	Episode: "The Sacrifice of Tantalus"
2019	Plebs	Hermes	Episode "The Wedding"
2019–2021	Another Life	William	Main role; 20 episodes
2021	Landscapers	DC Paul Wilkie	Main role; 4 episodes
2022	Red Rose	Vinny Mason	Main role; 4 episodes
2022	Mammals	Dan	2 episodes
2023	The Chemistry of Death	DCI Mackenzie	3 episodes
2023	Murder, They Hope	Samuel	Episode: "Blood Actually: A 'Murder, They Hope' Mystery"
2024	Renegade Nell	Sir George Horner	Episode: "Stop Printing This Muck"
2025–present	Amandaland	Mal	7 episodes
2025	Shetland	Matt Blake	Regular
2025	Wolf King	Broghan	Voice only
2025	The Walsh Sisters	Aidan	5 episodes

Audio

Year	Title	Role	Notes
2020	Eight Point Nine Nine	Darren Jones	
2020	Doctor Who: The Twelfth Doctor Chronicles	Danny Pink	Episode: "War Wounds"
2026	Fork in the Road	Rick	Episode: “August in Manchester”
