= Sleep of Reason (album) =

Studio album by Raffertie
- Released: August 6, 2013
- Genre: Electronic
- Length: 47:54
- Label: Ninja Tune
- Producer: Benjamin Stefanski

Professional ratings
Aggregate scores
Source	Rating
Metacritic	77/100
Review scores
Source	Rating
Clash	7/10
Exclaim!	7/10
Drowned in Sound	9/10
Mixmag	4/5 stars
Mojo	4/5 stars
MusicOMH	4/5 stars
Pitchfork	6.2/10
Q	4/5 stars
Uncut	8/10
This Is Fake DIY	8/10

Sleep of Reason is the debut album from English musician Raffertie. It was released in August 2013 under Ninja Tune Records.

== Track listing ==
No.	Title	Length
1.	"Undertow"	2:51
2.	"Rain"	3:18
3.	"Build Me Up"	3:05
4.	"Gagging Order"	3:40
5.	"Touching"	4:23
6.	"One Track Mind"	4:31
7.	"Last Train Home"	3:58
8.	"Trust" (featuring Yadi)	2:51
9.	"Principle Action"	4:53
10.	"Known"	4:35
11.	"Window Out"	3:54
12.	"Black Rainbow"	2:39
13.	"Back of the Line"	3:16

iTunes Bonus Track
No.	Title	Length
14.	"Veins"	3:29
