= The Neptunes production discography =

The following is a discography of production by the Neptunes, a production duo consisting of Pharrell Williams and Chad Hugo.

== Singles ==
=== 1996–2003 ===
List of singles, with selected chart positions, showing year released and album name
Title	Year	Peak chart positions										Certifications	Album
Title	Year	US	US R&B	AUS	CAN	FRA	GER	IRE	NL	SWI	UK	Certifications	Album
"Use Your Heart" (SWV)	1996	22	6	—	—	—	—	—	—	—	—		New Beginning
"When Boy Meets Girl" (Total)	1996	50	28	—	—	—	—	—	—	—	—		Total
"I Can't Make a Mistake" (MC Lyte)	1998	—	—	—	—	—	—	—	—	—	46		Seven & Seven
"It's All Yours" (MC Lyte featuring Gina Thompson)	1998	—	—	—	—	—	—	—	—	—	36		Seven & Seven
"Lookin' at Me" (Mase featuring Puff Daddy)	1998	8	8	—	17	—	—	—	—	—	—	RIAA: Gold	Harlem World
"Superthug" (N.O.R.E.)	1998	36	15	—	—	—	—	—	—	—	—		N.O.R.E.
"The Funeral" (Clipse)	1999	—	—	—	—	—	—	—	—	—	—		Exclusive Audio Footage
"Got Your Money" (Ol' Dirty Bastard featuring Kelis)	1999	26	19	—	—	82	—	—	96	—	11	BPI: Gold	Nigga Please
"Oh No" (N.O.R.E.)	1999	—	49	—	—	—	—	—	—	—	113		Melvin Flynt – Da Hustler
"Caught Out There" (Kelis)	1999	54	9	26	10	96	40	23	3	35	4	BPI: Silver	Kaleidoscope
"Good Stuff" (Kelis)	1999	—	—	—	—	—	72	49	78	74	19		Kaleidoscope
"Get Along with You" (Kelis)	2000	—	57	—	—	—	—	—	93	—	51		Kaleidoscope
"Shake Ya Ass" (Mystikal)	2000	13	3	62	—	—	87	—	66	—	30		Let's Get Ready
"Girls Dem Sugar" (Beenie Man featuring Mýa)	2000	54	16	—	—	—	—	—	—	—	13		Art and Life
"Cross the Border" (Philly's Most Wanted)	2000	98	50	—	—	—	—	—	—	—	—		Get Down or Lay Down
"I Just Wanna Love U (Give It 2 Me)" (Jay-Z)	2000	11	1	—	—	—	75	—	61	86	7	RIAA: Platinum	The Dynasty: Roc La Familia
"Danger (Been So Long)" (Mystikal featuring Nivea)	2000	14	1	—	—	—	45	—	36	60	28		Let's Get Ready
"Southern Hospitality" (Ludacris)	2000	23	6	—	—	—	—	—	—	—	—		Back for the First Time
"Dem Thangs" (Angie Martinez)	2001	—	80	—	—	—	—	—	—	—	—		Up Close and Personal
"Lapdance" (N.E.R.D. featuring Vita and Lee Harvey)	2001	—	85	—	—	—	—	—	56	—	20	BPI: Silver	In Search of...
"Wait a Minute" (Ray J featuring Lil' Kim and Pharrell)	2001	30	8	—	—	—	72		75	80	54		This Ain't a Game
"I'm Serious" (T.I. featuring Beenie Man)	2001	—	—	—	—	—	—	—	—	—	—		I'm Serious
"There She Goes" (Babyface)	2001	31	10	—	—	—	—	—	—	—	—		Face2Face
"Please Don't Mind" (Philly's Most Wanted)	2001	—	48	—	—	—	—	—	—	—	—		Get Down or Lay Down
"Candy" (Foxy Brown featuring Kelis)	2001	—	48	—	—	—	—	—	—	—	—		Broken Silence
"I'm a Slave 4 U" (Britney Spears)	2001	27	85	7	8	8	3	6	9	7	4	SNEP: Silver; BPI: Gold; RIAA: Platinum	Britney
"Young, Fresh n' New" (Kelis)	2001	—	—	—	—	—	—	—	89	—	32		Wanderland
"Knock Yourself Out" (Jadakiss)	2001	114	34	—	—	—	—	—	—	—	—		Kiss tha Game Goodbye
"Diddy" (P. Diddy featuring the Neptunes)	2001	66	21	31	—	—	59	—	—	84	19		The Saga Continues...
"Bouncin' Back (Bumpin' Me Against the Wall)" (Mystikal)	2001	37	8	—	—	—	—	—	—	—	45		Tarantula
"As I Come Back" (Busta Rhymes)	2001	—	91	—	—	—	—	—	—	—	—		Genesis
"Run Away (I Wanna Be with U)" (Nivea featuring Pusha T)	2001	—	—	47	—	—	—	—	—	—	48		Nivea
"Young'n (Holla Back)" (Fabolous)	2001	33	17	—	—	—	—	—	—	—	—		Ghetto Fabolous
"U Don't Have to Call" (Usher)	2002	3	2	56	—	72	—	—	—	27	6	RIAA: Platinum	8701
"I Still Love You" (702)	2002	—	49	—	—	—	—	—	—	—	—		Star
"Formal Invite" (Ray J featuring Pharrell)	2002	—	54	—	—	—	—	—	95	—	20		This Ain't a Game
"Pass the Courvoisier, Part II" (Busta Rhymes featuring P. Diddy and Pharrell)	2002	11	4	—	—	—	—	—	—	—	16		Genesis
"Girlfriend" (NSYNC featuring Nelly)	2002	5	23	2	1	—	6	8	8	23	2	ARIA: Gold; BPI: Gold	Celebrity
"Take Ya Home" (Lil' Bow Wow)	2002	72	21	—	—	—	—	—	—	—	—		Doggy Bag
"Hot in Herre" (Nelly)	2002	1	1	3	1	23	8	10	4	10	4	RIAA: 2× Platinum; ARIA: Platinum; BVMI: Gold; BPI: Platinum	Nellyville
"Grindin'" (Clipse)	2002	30	10	—	—	—	—	—	—	—	—		Lord Willin'
"Someday" (Scarface featuring Faith Evans)	2002	—	— (Note: "Someday" did not enter the Hot R&B/Hip-Hop Songs chart, but peaked at number 60 on the Hot R&B/Hip-Hop Singles Sales chart.)	—	—	—	—	—	—	—	—		The Fix
"Nothin'" (N.O.R.E. featuring Pharrell)	2002	10	2	—	—	—	—	—	—	—	11		God's Favorite
"Work It Out" (Beyoncé)	2002	—	—	21	—	87	75	12	26	48	7	ARIA: Gold	Austin Powers in Goldmember: Music from the Motion Picture
"Feel It Boy" (Beenie Man featuring Janet Jackson)	2002	28	31	18	15	—	72	—	—	—	9	ARIA: Gold	Tropical Storm
"Boys" (Britney Spears)	2002	—	—	14	21	55	19	10	13	20	7	ARIA: Gold	Britney
"Rock Star" (N.E.R.D.)	2002	—	—	32	—	—	—	—	74	—	15		In Search of...
"When the Last Time" (Clipse featuring Kelis and Pharrell)	2002	19	8	—	—	—	—	—	—	—	41		Lord Willin'
"Luv U Better" (LL Cool J featuring Marc Dorsey)	2002	4	1	—	—	—	—	—	—	42	7		10
"Like I Love You" (Justin Timberlake)	2002	11	53	8	11	—	16	5	5	14	2	ARIA: Platinum; BPI: Platinum	Justified
"From tha Chuuuch to da Palace" (Snoop Dogg featuring Pharrell)	2002	77	23	—	—	—	75	—	97	—	27		Paid tha Cost to Be da Boss
"Hit the Freeway" (Toni Braxton featuring Loon)	2002	86	32	46	31	—	56	40	—	38	29		More Than a Woman
"Come Close" (Common featuring Mary J. Blige)	2002	65	21	—	—	—	—	—	—	—	—		Electric Circus
"Ma, I Don't Love Her" (Clipse featuring Faith Evans)	2002	86	40	—	—	—	—	—	—	—	38		Lord Willin'
"Star" (702 featuring Clipse)	2002	—	98	—	—	—	—	—	—	—	—		Star
"Beautiful" (Snoop Dogg featuring Pharrell and Uncle Charlie Wilson)	2003	6	3	4	—	39	27	1	13	19	23	ARIA: Gold; BPI: Gold	Paid tha Cost to Be da Boss
"Excuse Me Miss" (Jay-Z)	2003	8	1	38	8	—	—	—	—	—	17	RIAA: Gold	The Blueprint 2: The Gift & The Curse
"What Happened to That Boy" (Baby featuring Clipse)	2003	45	14	—	—	—	—	—	—	—	—		Birdman
"Belly Dancer" (Kardinal Offishall featuring Pharrell)	2003	—	96	—	—	—	—	—	—	—	—		
"Rock Your Body" (Justin Timberlake)	2003	5	45	1		15	25	4	6	34	2	RIAA: Gold; ARIA: 2× Platinum; BPI: 2× Platinum	Justified
"Amazin'" (LL Cool J featuring Kandice Love)	2003	—	73	—	—	—	—	—	—	—	—		10
"Hot Damn" (Clipse featuring Ab-Liva, Pharrell, and Roscoe P. Coldchain)	2003	—	58	—	—	—	—	—	—	—	—		Lord Willin' and Clones
"Frontin'" (Pharrell Williams featuring Jay-Z)	2003	5	1	28	15	—	61	16	21	23	6	BPI: Gold	Clones
"Señorita" (Justin Timberlake)	2003	27	—	6	19	41	51	15	26	42	13	ARIA: Platinum; BPI: Silver	Justified
"Light Your Ass on Fire" (Busta Rhymes)	2003	58	23	—	—	—	—	—	—	—	—		Clones
"Milkshake" (Kelis)	2003	3	4	2	—	52	22	1	7	22	2	RIAA: Gold; ARIA: Platinum; BPI: Platinum	Tasty
"Change Clothes" (Jay-Z featuring Pharrell)	2003	10	6	46	—	—	54	—	40	3	32		The Black Album
"Show Me Your Soul" (Lenny Kravitz, P. Diddy, Loon, and Pharrell)	2003	—	—	45	—	—	61	—	—	62	35		Bad Boys 2 OST
"—" denotes a recording that did not chart or was not released in that territory.

=== 2004–present ===
List of singles, with selected chart positions, showing year released and album name
Title	Year	Peak chart positions										Certifications	Album
Title	Year	US	US R&B	AUS	CAN	FRA	GER	IRE	NL	SWI	UK	Certifications	Album
"Maybe" (N.E.R.D.)	2004	—	—	48	—	—	—	31	37	—	25		Fly or Die
"Flap Your Wings" (Nelly)	2004	52	1	—	—	—	—	2	1	—	1	RIAA: Gold; ARIA: Platinum; BPI: Silver	Sweat
"Like a Boss" (Slim Thug)	2004	—	67	—	—	—	—	—	—	—	—		Already Platinum
"Drop It Like It's Hot" (Snoop Dogg featuring Pharrell)	2004	1	1	4	—	21	8	7	7	3	10	RIAA: 2× Platinum; ARIA: Gold; BVMI: Gold; BPI: Platinum	R&G (Rhythm & Gangsta): The Masterpiece
"Let's Get Blown" (Snoop Dogg featuring Pharrell and Keyshia Cole)	2004	54	19	—	—	—	—	16	35	22	13		R&G (Rhythm & Gangsta): The Masterpiece
"I Ain't Heard of That" (Slim Thug featuring Pharrell and Bun B)	2005	—	34	—	—	—	—	—	—	—	—		Already Platinum
"For the Nasty" (Q-Tip featuring Busta Rhymes)	2005	—	86	—	—	—	—	—	—	—	—		—N/a
"Touch" (Omarion)	2005	94	35	—	—	—	—	—	—	—	—		O
"Hollaback Girl" (Gwen Stefani)	2005	1	8	1	12	17	3	4	7	6	8	RIAA: 6× Platinum; ARIA: Platinum; BVMI: Gold; BPI: Platinum	Love. Angel. Music. Baby.
"Signs" (Snoop Dogg featuring Charlie Wilson and Justin Timberlake)	2005	46	—	1	—	13	3	2	6	5	2	RIAA: Gold; ARIA: Gold; BPI: Platinum	R&G (Rhythm & Gangsta): The Masterpiece
"Don't Stop" (Beanie Sigel featuring Snoop Dogg)	2005	—	67	—	—	—	—	—	—	—	—		The B. Coming
"Wanna Love You Girl" (Robin Thicke featuring Pharrell)	2005	—	65	—	—	—	—	—	—	—	—		The Evolution of Robin Thicke
"Mr. Me Too" (Clipse featuring Pharrell)	2006	—	65	—	—	—	—	—	—	—	—		Hell Hath No Fury
"Tokyo Drift" (Teriyaki Boyz)	2006	—	—	—	—	—	—	—	—	—	—	BPI: Silver; BVMI: Gold	The Fast and the Furious: Tokyo Drift (Soundtrack)
"Margarita" (Sleepy Brown featuring Pharrell and Big Boi)	2006	—	—	—	—	—	—	—	—	—	—		Mr. Brown
"Money Maker" (Ludacris featuring Pharrell)	2006	1	1	—	—	—	86	—	—	—	—	RIAA: 2× Platinum	Release Therapy
"I Gotcha" (Lupe Fiasco)	2006	—	86	—	—	—	—	—	—	—	140		Food & Liquor
"Vato" (Snoop Dogg featuring B-Real)	2006	—	85	55	—	—	—	—	—	—	—		Tha Blue Carpet Treatment
"Wamp Wamp (What It Do)" (Clipse featuring Slim Thug)	2006	—	96	—	—	—	—	—	—	—	—		Hell Hath No Fury
"Wind It Up" (Gwen Stefani)	2006	6	—	5	—	12	21	10	6	14	3	ARIA: Gold; RIAA: Platinum	The Sweet Escape
"Give It Up" (Twista featuring Pharrell)	2007	—	95	—	—	—	—	—	—	—	—		Adrenaline Rush 2007
"Green Light" (Beyoncé)	2007	—	—	—	—	—	—	46	20	—	12	BPI: Silver	B'Day
"Blue Magic" (Jay-Z featuring Pharrell)	2007	55	31	—	69	—	—	—	—	—	—		American Gangster
"I Know" (Jay-Z featuring Pharrell)	2007	—	26	—	—	—	—	—	—	—	—		American Gangster
"Zock On!" (Teriyaki Boyz featuring Busta Rhymes and Pharrell)	2008	—	—	—	—	—	—	—	—	—	—		Serious Japanese
"Everyone Nose (All the Girls Standing in the Line for the Bathroom)" (N.E.R.D.)	2008	—	—	—	—	—	—	—	—	—	41		Seeing Sounds
"Universal Mind Control" (Common featuring Pharrell)	2008	62	60	—	—	—	—	—	—	—	—		Universal Mind Control
"Announcement" (Common featuring Pharrell)	2008	—	94	—	—	—	—	—	—	—	—		Universal Mind Control
"Spaz" (N.E.R.D.)	2008	—	—	—	—	—	—	—	—	—	—		Seeing Sounds
"Give It 2 Me" (Madonna)	2008	57	—	23	8	5	8	10	3	4	7	BPI: Silver	Hard Candy
"I'm Good" (Clipse featuring Pharrell)	2009	—	27	—	—	—	—	—	—	—	—		Til the Casket Drops
"Did It Again" (Shakira)	2009	—	—	—	—	—	34	17	—	29	26		She Wolf
"Popular Demand (Popeye's)" (Clipse featuring Cam'ron and Pharrell)	2009	—	90	—	—	—	—	—	—	—	—		Til the Casket Drops
"Hot-n-Fun" (N.E.R.D. featuring Nelly Furtado)	2010	—	—	—	98	—	—	—	88	—	49		Nothing
"Hypnotize U" (N.E.R.D.)	2010	—	—	—	—	—	—	—	—	—	—		Nothing
"Get Back Up" (T.I. featuring Chris Brown)	2010	70	37	91	—	—	—	—	—	—	—		No Mercy
"Trouble on My Mind" (Pusha T featuring Tyler, the Creator)	2011	—	—	—	—	—	—	—	—	—	—		Fear of God II: Let Us Pray
"Gotta Have It" (Jay-Z and Kanye West)	2011	69	14	—	—	—	—	—	—	—	—	RIAA: Platinum; BPI: Silver	Watch the Throne
"Glory" (Jay-Z featuring B.I.C.)	2012	—	63	—	—	—	—	—	—	—	—		—N/a
"So Many Pros" (Snoop Dogg)	2015	—	—	—	—	169	—	—	—	—	—		Bush
"California Roll" (Snoop Dogg featuring Stevie Wonder)	2015	—	49	—	—	140	—	—	27	—	—		Bush
"Supplies" (Justin Timberlake)	2018	71	—	—	49	128	83	—	—	84	84		Man of the Woods
"Pomegranate" (deadmau5 and the Neptunes)	2020	—	—	—	—	—	—	—	—	—	—		TBA
"Entrepreneur" (Pharrell Williams featuring Jay-Z)	2020	—	—	—	—	—	—	—	—	—	—		TBA
"Trenches" (Monica featuring Lil Baby)	2020	—	—	—	—	—	—	—	—	—	—		Trenches
"Hit Different" (SZA featuring Ty Dolla Sign)	2020	29	12	84	55	—	—	—	2	—	55	RIAA: 3× Platinum; BPI: Silver	—N/a
"—" denotes a recording that did not chart or was not released in that territory.

== Albums ==
List of albums entirely produced by The Neptunes
Album	Year	Artist
Exclusive Audio Footage	1999	Clipse
Kaleidoscope	1999	Kelis
In Search of...	2001	N.E.R.D.
Wanderland	2001	Kelis
Lord Willin'	2002	Clipse
Clones	2003	The Neptunes
Fly or Die	2004	N.E.R.D.
Hell Hath No Fury	2006	Clipse
Seeing Sounds	2008	N.E.R.D.
Nothing	2010	N.E.R.D.

== 1996 ==
Total – Total

- 14. "When Boy Meets Girl" {produced with Sean "Puffy" Combs}

SWV – The New Beginning

- 6. "Use Your Heart"
- 10. "Use Your Heart (Interlude)"
- 13. "When This Feeling"

== 1997 ==
Mase – Harlem World

- 06. "Lookin' at Me" (featuring Puff Daddy)

== 1998 ==
Noreaga – N.O.R.E.

- 13. "Superthug"

MC Lyte – Seven & Seven

- 10. "It's All Yours" (featuring Gina Thompson)
- 11. "I Can't Make a Mistake"
- 16. "Closer" (featuring Space Nine)

The Lox - CDS
- "If You Think I'm Jiggy (Remix)"
Brand Nubian – CDS

- "Take It to the Head" (Don't Let It Go to Your Head Remix)

Janita - CDS

- "Baby, I Can't Stop (120 BPM Remix)"

== 1999 ==
=== Clipse – Exclusive Audio Footage {unreleased} ===
Harlem World – Tha Movement

- 10. One Big Fiesta (featuring Mase)
- 13. Not the Kids (featuring Rashad)

Half-A-Mill – Milion

- 10. "Thug Onez" (featuring Noreaga, Kool G Rap & Musalini)

=== Kelis – Kaleidoscope ===
Noreaga – Melvin Flynt – Da Hustler

- 5. "Cocaine Business (Hysteria)" [featuring Kelis]
- 16. "Oh No" (featuring Pharrell)

Ol' Dirty Bastard – Nigga Please

- 1. "Recognize" (featuring Chris Rock)
- 3. "Cold Blooded"
- 4. "Got Your Money" (featuring Kelis)

Pras – CDS

- Whatcha Wanna Do (The Neptunes Bang Your Head Remix) [feat. Pharrell, Kelis and Clipse]

Kid Rock - CDS

- "Cowboy" (Remix) [feat. Pharrell]

Maxi Priest - CDS

- "Mary Got a Baby (Remix)" [feat. Beanie Man]

Prince – CDM

- "The Greatest Romance Ever Sold" (Neptunes Extended Edit) [feat. Q-Tip]

== 2000 ==
504 Boyz – The Goodfellas

- 18. "D-Game" (featuring Pharrell and Pusha T)
Various Artists - Any Given Sunday (soundtrack)
- 16. "Jump" - Mystikal [also found on Let's Get Ready]
Angie Stone - CDS
- "Everyday" (Remix) [feat. Pusha T]
Ben Harper and the Innocent Criminals – CDS

- 4. "Steal My Kisses (The Neptunes Beatbox Mix)"

Beenie Man – Art and Life

- 2. "Ola" (featuring Steve Perry)
- 4. "Girls Dem Sugar" (featuring Mýa)
- 7. "Jamaica Way" (featuring Kelis)

Mystikal – Let's Get Ready

- 2. "Shake Ya Ass" (featuring Pharrell)
- 3. Jump
- 4. "Danger (Been So Long)" [featuring Nivea]
- 10. "Family" (featuring Latrelle)
- 00. "Jump (Remix)" [feat. Kelis]

Shyne – Shyne

- 9. "Niggas Gonna Die"

Sade – CDS

- "By Your Side (The Neptunes Remix)"

Jay-Z – The Dynasty: ROC La Familia

- 3. "I Just Wanna Love U (Give It 2 Me) [featuring Pharrell, Shay Haley & Omilio Sparks]

Lord Tariq and Peter Gunz - CDS

- "What's That Sound?"

Guru – Jazzmatazz Vol. 3: Streetsoul

- 4. "All I Said" (featuring Macy Gray)
- 10. "Supa Luv" (featuring Kelis)

All Saints – Saints & Sinners

- 14. "Black Coffee (The Neptunes Remix)" [feat. Pusha T]

Ludacris – Back for the First Time

- 14. "Southern Hospitality"

Lil' Kim – CDS

- "How Many Licks (Neptunes Remix)" [feat. Pharrell, Snoop Dogg, Sisqo & Kelis]

Cole - CDS

- "I Can Do Too (Remix)" [feat. Queen Latifah]

Sheã Seger – May Street Project

- 3. "Blind Situation" (featuring D.R.U.G.S.) {drum progammig}
- 00. "Clutch (Neptunes Remix)"

== 2001 ==
Various artists – Urban Renewal: The Songs of Phil Collins

- 8. "I Don't Care Anymore" - Kelis with Pharrell [also found on Wanderland]
- 14. "I Wish It Would Rain Down" - Brian McKnight

Angie Martinez – Up Close & Personal

- 17. "Dem Thangz" (featuring Pharrell & Q-Tip)

Britney Spears – Britney

- 1. "I'm a Slave 4 U"
- 5. "Boys"
- 00. "Boys (Co-Ed Remix)"

Ray J – This Ain't a Game

- 2. "Wait a Minute" (featuring Pharrell & Lil' Kim)
- 4. "Formal Invite" (featuring Pharrell)
- 8. "Out tha Ghetto" (featuring Shorty Mack)

P. Diddy – The Saga Continues...

- 7. "Diddy"

Tha Liks – X.O. Experience

- 13. "Best U Can" (featuring Pharrell)

Backstreet Boys – Black & Blue

- 16. "The Call (Neptunes Remix)" [featuring Clipse]

Foxy Brown – Broken Silence

- 7. "Candy" (featuring Kelis)
- 14. "Gangsta Boogie"

=== Kelis – Wanderland ===
NSYNC – Celebrity

- 4. "Girlfriend"
- 00. "Girlfriend (Remix) [feat. Nelly]"

Various artists – Rush Hour 2 OST

- 13. Blow My Whistle - Hikaru Utada with Foxy Brown

Jadakiss – Kiss tha Game Goodbye

- 4. "Knock Yourself Out" (featuring Pharrell)

Philly's Most Wanted – Get Down or Lay Down

- 1. "Radikal"
- 3. "Suckas"
- 4. "Pretty Tony"
- 5. "Please Don't Mind"
- 6. "Philly Celebrities"
- 7. "Ladies Choice"
- 9. "Cross the Border"
- 10. "Dream Car" (featuring Pharrell)
- 13. "Suckas, Pt. 2" (featuring Beanie Sigel & Rosco P. Coldchain)
- 16. "Street Tax" (featuring Clipse)
- 18. "Cross the Border (J.B.M. Remix)" [featuring Pusha T and Fabolous]

Usher – 8701

- 3. "I Don't Know" (featuring Pharrell & P. Diddy)
- 8. "U Don't Have to Call"

Nivea – Nivea

- "Run Away (I Wanna Be With U)" [featuring Pusha T]

Various artists – Dr. Dolittle 2 OST

- 7. "What It Is Part II" - Flipmode Squad with Kelis

Mary J. Blige – No More Drama

- 3. "Steal Away" (featuring Pharrell and Malice)

Babyface – Face2Face

- 2. "There She Goes"
- 4. "Stressed Out" (featuring Pharrell)

Fabolous – Ghetto Fabolous

- 3. "Young'n (Holla Back)"

Krayzie Bone – Thug on da Line

- 14. "I Don't Know What" (featuring Kelis)

Various artists – Training Day OST

- 12. "Guns N' Roses" - Clipse

Garbage – CDS

- "Androgyny" (The Neptunes Remix)

Daft Punk – CDS

- "Harder, Better, Faster, Stronger" (The Neptunes Remix)

T.I. – I'm Serious

- 7. "I'm Serious" (featuring Beenie Man)
- 9. "What's Yo Name" (featuring Pharrell)

Alana Davis – Fortune Cookies

- 6. "Bye Bye"

All Star Tribute – What's Going On: All-Star Tribute

- 8. "What's Going On (The Neptunes Very Special This One's for You Mix)" [feat. Faith Evans, Angie Martinez, Da Brat, Fabolous, LL COOL J, Mobb Deep, N.O.R.E., Queen Latifah, Royce Da 5'9" & Sonja Blade]

==== Eric Benét - CDS ====
- "Love Don't Love Me" (Neptunes Remix) [featuring Clipse & Pharrell]

Jermaine Dupri – Instructions

- 14. "Let's Talk About It" (featuring Clipse and Pharrell) [also found on Lord Willin']

FUBU - FB Ent. Presents: The Good Life

- 00. "Fatty Girl (Remix)" [featuring Ludacris, Keith Murray, Pharrell and LL Cool J]

Faith Evans – Faithfully

- 4. "Burnin' Up"

Busta Rhymes – Genesis

- 3. "As I Come Back"
- 16. "What It Is" (featuring Kelis) [also found on Violator: The Album, V2.0]

==== Various Artists - Violator: The Album, V2.0 ====
- 03. Grimey - N.O.R.E. [also found on God's Favorite]

Ice Cube – The Greatest Hits

- 17. "In the Late Night Hour" (featuring Pusha T & Pharrell)

Joe – Better Days

- 5. "Isn't This the World?"

==== Janet Jackson - CDS ====
- "Son of a Gun (Ruff Neptunes Mix)" [featuring Missy Elliottt]

Lil' Bow Wow – Doggy Bag / Like Mike (soundtrack)

- 3. "Take Ya Home"

Limp Bizkit – New Old Songs

- 1. "Nookie - For the Nookie" (Remixed by the Neptunes)
- 6. "N 2 Gether Now - All in Together Now" (Remixed by the Neptunes)

Musaliny-N-M.a.z.e. - CDS

- 1. "Thugmania (Rock with Us)" [featuring Capone-N-Noreaga]

Mystikal – Tarantula

- 1. "Bouncin' Back (Bouncin' Me Against the Wall)" [featuring Pharrell]
- 12. "Go 'Head" (featuring Pharrell)

Latrelle – Dirty Girl, Wrong Girl, Bad Girl ~~{mostly unreleased}~~

- 3. "House Party"
- 4. "Dirty Girl" (featuring Lisa “Left Eye” Lopes")
- 7. "My Life" (featuring Kelis)
- 11. "Infatuated"
- 14. "Nothing Else"
- 9. "I Want U" (featuring Pusha T)
- 16. "Long Time"
- 17. "I Need U" (featuring Pharrell)

== 2002 ==
Air – Everybody Hertz

- 4. "Don't Be Light" (Neptunes Remix)

Busta Rhymes - VLS

- "Pass the Courvoisier Part II" (featuring Pharrell & P. Diddy)

Common – Electric Circus

- 6. "Come Close" (featuring Mary J. Blige)
- 9. "I Got a Right Tha" (featuring Pharrell)

Destiny's Child – This Is the Remix

- 2. "Emotion" (The Neptunes Remix)

Nelly – Nellyville

- 3. "Hot in Herre"

N.O.R.E. – God's Favorite

- 3. "Nothin'" (featuring Pharrell)
- 8. "Full Mode"
- 10. "Head Bussa"
- 15. "Consider This" (featuring Kelis)

Various Artists – Austin Powers in Goldmember OST

- 1. "Work It Out" - Beyoncé

Scarface – The Fix

- 9. "Someday" (featuring Faith Evans)

Beenie Man – Tropical Storm

- 2. "Feel It Boy" (featuring Janet Jackson)
- 3. "Bad Girl" (featuring Justin Vince)
- 10. "Bossman" (featuring Lady Saw and Sean Paul)

=== Clipse – Lord Willin' ===
TLC – 3D

- 5. "In Your Arms Tonight"

Royce da 5'9" – Rock City 2.0

- 3. "Off Parole" (featuring Tre Little)
- 6. "Mr. Baller" (featuring Clipse, Pharrell and Tre Little)

LL Cool J – 10

- 3. "Luv U Better" (featuring Marc Dorsey)
- 6. "Niggy Nuts"
- 7. "Amazin'" (featuring Kandice Love)
- 8. "Clockin' G's"
- 12. "U Should"

702 – Star

- 2. "Star" (featuring Clipse)
- 6. "I Still Love You" (featuring Pharrell)

Alicia Keys – Remixed & Unplugged in a Minor

- 7. "How Come You Don't Call Me" (Neptunes Remix)

Justin Timberlake – Justified

- 1. "Señorita"
- 2. Like I Love You (featuring Clipse)
- 4. "Take It from Here"
- 6. "Rock Your Body"
- 7. "Nothin' Else"
- 8. "Last Night"
- 12. "Let's Take a Ride"

Birdman – Birdman

- 10. "What Happened to That Boy" (featuring Clipse)

Ms. Jade – Girl Interrupted

- 4. "The Come Up"

Jay-Z – The Blueprint 2: The Gift & The Curse

- 5. "Excuse Me Miss" (featuring Pharrell)
- 9. "Fuck All Nite"
- 19. "Nigga Please" (featuring Young Chris)
- 22. "A Ballad for the Fallen Soldier" (featuring DJ Clue?)

Toni Braxton – More Than a Woman

- 4. "Hit the Freeway" (featuring Loon)

Ja Rule – The Last Temptation

- 4. "Pop Niggas"

Busta Rhymes – It Ain't Safe No More...

- 4. "Call the Ambulance" (featuring Rampage)

Snoop Dogg – Paid tha Cost to Be da Bo$$

- 4. "From tha Chuuuch to da Palace" (featuring Pharrell)
- 8. "Beautiful" (featuring Pharrell & Charlie Wilson)

Sean Paul – Dutty Rock

- 18. "Bubble" (featuring Fahrenheit)

Solange – Solo Star

- 5. "Crush"

== 2003 ==
The Rolling Stones - Sympathies (CDS)
- "Sympathy for the Devil" (Neptunes Remix)

Kelis – Tasty

- 3. "Milkshake"
- 6. "Flashback" [also found on Wanderland]
- 7. "Protect My Heart"
- 10. "Sugar Honey Iced Tea"
- 12. "Rolling Through the Hood"
- 00. "Milkshake (Remix)" [featuring Pusha T & Pharrell]

Various artists – Charlie's Angels 2 – Full Throttle OST

- 10. "Nas' Angels...The Flyest" - Nas with Pharrell

=== The Neptunes - Clones ===
Various artists - Bad Boys 2 OST

- 2. "Show Me Your Soul" - P. Diddy, Lenny Kravitz, Pharrell and Loon {produced with Lenny Kravitz and Sean "Puffy" Combs}
- 3. "La-La-La (Excuse Me Miss Again)" - Jay-Z

Various artists – Biker Boyz OST

- 4. "Don't Look Back" - Papa Roach with N*E*R*D

Ludacris - Chicken-n-Beer

- 10. "P-Poppin" (featuring Shawnna and Lil Fate) {produced with Zukhan Bey}

Bow Wow – Unleashed

- 6. "The Don, the Dutch"
- 7. "The Movement"
- 11. "I'll Move On" (featuring Mario)

Jay-Z – The Black Album

- 5. "Change Clothes"
- 13. "Allure"

== 2004 ==
Various artists – Barbershop 2: Back In Business OST

- "Pussy" - Clipse

CeeLo Green – Cee-Lo Green... Is the Soul Machine

- 3. "The Art of Noise" (featuring Pharrell)
- 16. "Let's Stay Together" (featuring Pharrell)

Jadakiss – Kiss of Death

- 9. "Hot Sauce to Go" (featuring Pharrell)

Talib Kweli– The Beautiful Struggle

- 3. "Broken Glass"

Fabolous – Real Talk

- 5. "Tit 4 Tat" (featuring Pharrell)
- 14. "Young & Sexy" (featuring Pharrell and Mike Shorey)

Nelly – Sweat

- 3. Flap Your Wings"

Nelly – Suit

- 1. "Play It Off" (featuring Pharrell)

Usher - Yeah! CDS

- 03. "Sweet Lies" (featuring Vanessa Marquez)

Gwen Stefani – Love. Angel. Music. Baby.

- 3. "Hollaback Girl"

Lil Jon & the East Side Boyz – Crunk Juice

- 19. "Stick Dat Thang Out (Skeezer)" [featuring Pharrell and Ying Yang Twins]

Snoop Dogg – R&G (Rhythm & Gangsta): The Masterpiece

- 3. "Drop It Like It's Hot" (featuring Pharrell)
- 8. "Let's Get Blown" (featuring Pharrell)
- 10. "Perfect" (featuring Charlie Wilson)
- 16. "Signs" (featuring Justin Timberlake & Charlie Wilson)
- 18. "Pass It Pass It"
- 00, "Drop It Like It's Hot (Remix)" [featuring Jay-Z & Pharrell]

T.I. – Urban Legend

- 11. "Freak Though" (featuring Pharrell)

Re-Up Gang – We Got It 4 Cheap Vol. 1

- 13. "Stuntin' Y'all" (featuring Pharrell)

== 2005 ==
Omarion – O

- 2. "Touch"

Beanie Sigel – The B. Coming

- 5. "Don't Stop" (featuring Snoop Dogg)

Faith Evans – The First Lady

- 1. "Goin' Out" (featuring Pharrell & Pusha T)

Mariah Carey – The Emancipation of Mimi

- 5. "Say Somethin' (featuring Snoop Dogg)
- 12. "To the Floor" (featuring Nelly)

Missy Elliott – The Cookbook

- 7. "On & On"

Slim Thug – Already Platinum

- 2. "Like a Boss"
- 6. "I Ain't Heard of That (Remix)" [featuring Bun B]
- 7. "Click Clack" (featuring Pusha T)
- 9. "Already Platinum" (featuring Pharrell)
- 10. "Ashy to Classy"
- 12. "Playa Ya Don't Know"
- 15. "This Is My Life" (featuring LeToya Luckett)
- 16. "Dedicate"

Twista – The Day After

- 5. "Lavish" (featuring Pharrell)
- 10. "When I Get You Home (A.I.O.U.)" [featuring Jamie Foxx and Pharrell]

Q-Tip – CDS

- "For the Nasty" (featuring Pharrell and Busta Rhymes)

Teriyaki Boyz – Beef or Chicken

- 6. "超 L A R G E" (featuring Pharrell)

== 2006 ==
Various artists – The Fast and the Furious: Tokyo Drift OST

- 1. "Tokyo Drift" - Teriyaki Boyz [also found on Serious Japanese]

=== Various Artists - That's Mad Raven Too! ===
- 05. "She's No You (Remix)" - Jesse McCartney

T.I. – King

- 15. "Goodlife" (featuring Pharrell and Common)

Robin Thicke - The Evolution of Robin Thicke

- 02. "Wanna Love You Girl" (featuring Pharrell)

Beyoncé – B'Day

- 6. "Kitty Kat" {produced with Beyoncé}
- 8. "Green Light" {produced with Beyoncé and Sean Garrett}

Fefe Dobson – Sunday Love

- 2. "In the Kissah" {produced with Fefe Dobson}

Mos Def – True Magic

- 11. "Murder of a Teenage Life"

Lupe Fiasco – Food & Liquor

- 5. "I Gotcha"

Ludacris – Release Therapy

- 3. "Money Maker" (featuring Pharrell)
- 4. "Girls Gone Wild"

LL Cool J – Todd Smith

- 5. "Best Dress" (featuring Jamie Foxx)

Rampage - Have You Seen?
- 14. "I'm Rollin' with You!"

Sleepy Brown – Mr. Brown

- 2. "Margarita" (featuring Pharrell & Big Boi)

Diddy – Press Play

- 19. "Partners for Life" (featuring Jamie Foxx)

Jay-Z – Kingdom Come

- 9. "Anything" (featuring Pharrell and Usher)

Snoop Dogg – Tha Blue Carpet Treatment

- 4. "Vato" (featuring B-Real)
- 11. "10 Lil' Crips"

=== Clipse – Hell Hath No Fury ===
Gwen Stefani – The Sweet Escape

- 1. "Wind It Up" {produced with Spike Stent and Ron Fair}
- 3. "Orange County Girl"
- 7. "Yummy" (featuring Pharrell)
- 9. “Breakin’ Up”
- 11. "U Started It" {produced with Spike Stent}

Ciara – The Evolution

- 5. "I Proceed"
- 17. "I'm Just Me" (featuring Pharrell)

Omarion – 21

- 6. "Obsession"

== 2007 ==
Yung Joc – Hustlenomics

- 5. "Hell Yeah" (featuring Diddy)
- 9. "BYOB"

Jay-Z – American Gangster

- 8. "I Know" (featuring Pharrell)
- 14. "Blue Magic" (featuring Pharrell)

Twista – Adrenaline Rush 2007

- 14. "Give It Up" (featuring Pharrell)

Tito El Bambino – It's My Time

- 7."Booty" (featuring Pharrell)

Britney Spears – Blackout

- 12. "Why Should I Be Sad?"

Mario – Go

- 1. "Go"

Mary J. Blige – Growing Pains

- 8. "Till the Morning"

== 2008 ==
Snoop Dogg – Ego Trippin'

- 10. "Sets Up" (featuring Pharrell)

Madonna – Hard Candy

(Tracks produced with Madonna)

- 1. "Candy Shop"
- 3. "Give It 2 Me"
- 4. "Heartbeat"
- 6. "She's Not Me"
- 7. "Incredible"
- 8. "Beat Goes On" (featuring Kanye West)
- 10. "Spanish Lesson"
- 13. “Ring My Bell” (Bonus Track)

My Drive Thru (Converse Anniversary)

- "My Drive Thru" (featuring Pharrell, Santogold and Julian Casablancas)

Solange – Sol-Angel and the Hadley St. Dreams

- 6. "I Decided"

Nelly – Brass Knuckles

- 10. "Let It Go (Lil' Mama)" [featuring Pharrell]

Chester French – She Loves Everybody EP

- 2. "She Loves Everybody (The Neptunes Remix)"

Common – Universal Mind Control

- 1. "Intro/Universal Mind Control" (featuring Pharrell)
- 2. "Punch Drunk Love (The Eye)" (featuring Kanye West)
- 4. "Sex for Suga"
- 5. "Announcement" (featuring Pharrell)
- 6. "Gladiator" (featuring Pharrell)
- 8. "Inhale"
- 9. "What a World" (featuring Chester French)

== 2009 ==
Teriyaki Boyz – Serious Japanese

- 2. Work That!" (featuring Pharrell & Chris Brown)
- 9. "Zock On!" (featuring Pharrell and Busta Rhymes)
- 14. "Tokyo Drift (Remix)" [featuring Pusha T & Fam-Lay]

Manami - CDS

- 01. Back of My Mind

Various artists – Fast & Furious OST

- 2. "G-Stro" - Busta Rhymes
- 4. "Blanco" - Pitbull with Pharrell
- 6. "You Slip, She Grip" - Tego Calderón with Pitbull
- 7. "Head Bust" - Shark City Click with Pharrell
- 8. "Bad Girls" - Pitbull with Robin Thicke

Jadakiss – The Last Kiss

- 7. "Stress Ya" (featuring Pharrell)
- 11. "Rockin' with the Best" (featuring Pharrell & Bobby V)

Mos Def – The Ecstatic

- 2. "Twilite Speedball" (produced with Mos Def)

Queen Latifah – Persona

- 12. "If He Wanna" (featuring Serani)

Jay-Z – The Blueprint 3

- 14. "So Ambitious" (featuring Pharrell)

Shakira – She Wolf

(Tracks produced with Shakira)

- 2. "Did It Again"
- 3. "Long Time"
- 4. "Why Wait"
- 5. "Good Stuff"
- 10. "Lo Hecho Está Hecho"
- 11. "Años Luz "

Jennifer Lopez (aka Lola) – "Fresh Out the Oven"

- "Fresh Out the Oven" (featuring Pharrell & Pitbull)

Various artists – 90210 OST

- 2. "Soldier" - N*E*R*D with Santigold

Michael Jackson – The Remix Suite

- 2. "Never Can Say Goodbye (Neptunes Remix)"

Wale – Attention Deficit

- 6. "Let It Loose" (featuring Pharrell)

Clipse – Til the Casket Drops

- 2. "Popular Demand (Popeyes)" [featuring Cam'ron & Pharrell]
- 4. "Showing Out" (featuring Yo Gotti & Pharrell)
- 5. "I'm Good" (featuring Pharrell)
- 7. "Door Man"
- 9. "All Eyes on Me" (featuring Keri Hilson)
- 10. "Counseling" (featuring Nicole Hurst & Pharrell)
- 11. "Champion" (featuring Graph Nobel)
- 13. "Life Change" (featuring Kenna)

Snoop Dogg – Malice n Wonderland

- 13. "Special" (featuring Brandy and Pharrell)

== 2010 ==
T.I. – No Mercy

- 3. "Get Back Up" (featuring Chris Brown)
- 10. "Amazing" (featuring Pharrell)

CeeLo Green – It's OK (CD Maxi-Single)

- 4. "Bridges"

Split Suicide - The Apple Fell Far from the Tree

- 05. Lasers and Lightsabers

Gucci Mane – The Appeal: Georgia's Most Wanted

- 9. "Haterade" (featuring Nicki Minaj and Pharrell Williams)

Ludacris – Battle of the Sexes

- 15. "Sexting" {Bonus Track}

== 2011 ==
Lupe Fiasco – Lasers

- 13. "I'm Beamin"

Travis Barker – Give the Drummer Some

- 2. "If You Want To" (featuring Pharrell and Lupe Fiasco) {produced with Travis Barker}

Big Sean – Finally Famous

- 8. "Get It (DT)"

The Cool Kids – When Fish Ride Bicycles

- 8. "Get Right"

JAY-Z & Kanye West – Watch the Throne

- 5. "Gotta Have It" {produced with Kanye West}

Pusha T – Fear of God II: Let Us Pray

- 3. "Trouble on My Mind" (featuring Tyler, the Creator) {produced with Left Brain}
- 9. "Raid" (featuring 50 Cent and Pharrell)

== 2012 ==
Jay-Z – Glory (Promo CDS)

- "Glory" (featuring B.I.C.)

Game - California Republic

- 15. "When My Niggas Come Home" (featuring Snoop Dogg and Pharrell)
- 16. "It Must Be Tough" (featuring Pharrell and Mysonne)
- 22. "They Don't Want None" (featuring Shyne and Pharrell)
- 24. "Roll My Shit" (featuring Snoop Dogg)

D.O.P.E. - D.O.P.E.

- 2. "Block Blazer" (feat. T.I.)

== 2013 ==
Earl Sweatshirt – Doris

- 2. "Burgundy" (featuring Vince Staples)

Pusha T - Wrath of Caine

- 6. Revolution

== 2015 ==
N*E*R*D – The SpongeBob Movie: Sponge Out Of Water OST

- 1. "Squeeze Me"
- 2. "Sandy Squirrel"
- 3. "Patrick Star"

Snoop Dogg – Bush

- 1. "California Roll" (featuring Stevie Wonder)
- 2. "This City"
- 3. "R U a Freak"
- 4. "Awake"
- 5. "So Many Pros"
- 7. "Edibles" (featuring T.I.)

== 2016 ==
Little Big Town - Wanderlust

- 7. "Miracle"

== 2018 ==
Justin Timberlake - Man of the Woods

(Tracks produced with Justin Timberlake)

- 2. "Midnight Summer Jam"
- 4. "Man of the Woods"
- 5. "Higher, Higher"
- 6. "Wave"
- 7. "Supplies"
- 11. "Flannel"
- 12. "Montana"
- 13. "Breeze off the Pond"
- 14. "Living off the Land"

Rack Frost - It Never Stops

- 05. Who Is Rack Frost?

Travis Scott - Astroworld

- 7. "Skeletons" (co-producer)

== 2019 ==
Daniel Caesar - Case Study 01

- 4. "Frontal Lobe Muzik" (featuring Pharrell Williams)

Pharrell Williams – Music from The Black Godfather

- 1. "Letter to My Godfather"

== 2020 ==
Megan Thee Stallion - Suga

- 7. "Stop Playing" (featuring Gunna)
- 8. "Crying in the Car"

Buju Banton - Upside Down 2020

- 9. "Cherry Pie" (featuring Pharrell)

Monica - "Trenches"

- 1. "Trenches" (featuring Lil Baby)

SZA - "Hit Different"

- 1. "Hit Different" (featuring Ty Dolla Sign)

deadmau5 and the Neptunes - "Pomegranate"

- 1. "Pomegranate"

Pharrell Williams - "Entrepreneur"

- 1. "Entrepreneur" (featuring Jay-Z)

== 2021 ==
Summer Walker - Still Over It

- 14. "Dat Right There" (featuring Pharrell Williams)

Moneybagg Yo - A Gangsta's Pain

- 15. "Projects"
- 18. "Certified Neptunes" (featuring Pharrell Williams)

=== Cassie Ventura - "Hide" ===
- 01. "Hide" (featuring Pharrell)

Snoh Aalegra - Temporary Highs in the Violet Skies

- 03. "In Your Eyes"

IDK - USEE4YOURSELF

- 12. Keto (featuring Swae Lee and Rico Nasty)

Pop Smoke - Faith

- 07. "Top Shotta" (featuring BEAM, Pusha T, TRAVI)
- 17. "Spoiled" (featuring Pharrell Williams)
- 20. "Merci Beaucoup"

Metallica - The Metallica Blacklist

Disc 3

- 03. "Wherever I May Roam" (Remix)

A$AP Ferg - "Green Juice"

- 01. "Green Juice"

Orelsan - Civilisation

- 12. "Dernier verre"

== 2022 ==
Nigo - I Know Nigo!

- 01. "Lost & Found Freestyle 2019" - A$AP Rocky, Tyler, The Creator & Nigo
- 03. "Punch Bowl" - Clipse & Nigo

Omar Apollo - Ivory

- 12. "Tamagotchi"

Brent Faiyaz - Wasteland

- 09. "Wasting Time" (featuring Drake)
