= MTV Video Music Award Japan for Best Hip-Hop Video =

Annual Japanese music award

Best Hip-Hop Video (最優秀ヒップホップビデオ賞)

== Results ==
The following table displays the nominees and the winners in bold print with a yellow background.

=== 2000s ===
Year	Artist	Video
**2002** (1st)	**Rip Slyme**	
**2002** (1st)	Dabo	
**2002** (1st)	Missy Elliott, Lil Kim, Christina Aguilera, Pink	Lady Marmalade
**2002** (1st)	Jay-Z	
**2002** (1st)	Rhymester	
**2003** (2nd)	**Rip Slyme**	**"Funkastic"**
**2003** (2nd)	Eminem	"Without Me"
**2003** (2nd)	Missy Elliott	"Work It"
**2003** (2nd)	King Giddra	"F.F.B."
**2003** (2nd)	Nelly	"Hot in Herre"
**2004** (3rd)	**Zeebra**	**"Touch The Sky"**
**2004** (3rd)	50 Cent	"21 Questions"
**2004** (3rd)	Missy Elliott	"Pass That Dutch"
**2004** (3rd)	Jay-Z featuring Pharrell	"Change Clothes"
**2004** (3rd)	Rhymester	"The Great Amateurism" (ザ・グレート・アマチュアリズム)
**2005** (4th)	**Beastie Boys**	**"Ch-Check It Out"**
**2005** (4th)	The Black Eyed Peas	"Let's Get It Started"
**2005** (4th)	Kreva featuring Mummy-D	"Funky Glamorous" (ファンキーグラマラス)
**2005** (4th)	Nitro Microphone Underground	"Still Shinin"
**2005** (4th)	Kanye West	"Jesus Walks"
**2006** (5th)	**50 Cent featuring Mobb Deep**	**"Outta Control"**
**2006** (5th)	Kreva	"Issai Gassai" (イッサイガッサイ)
**2006** (5th)	Teriyaki Boyz	"HeartBreaker"
**2006** (5th)	Kanye West featuring Jamie Foxx	"Gold Digger"
**2006** (5th)	Zeebra	"Street Dreams"
**2007** (6th)	**Kreva**	**"The Show"**
**2007** (6th)	Jay-Z	"Show Me What You Got"
**2007** (6th)	Nas	"Hip Hop is Dead"
**2007** (6th)	T.I.	"What You Know"
**2007** (6th)	Teriyaki Boyz featuring Kanye West	"I Still Love H.E.R."
**2008** (7th)	**Rip Slyme**	**"I.N.G"**
**2008** (7th)	50 Cent featuring Justin Timberlake and Timbaland	"Ayo Technology (She Wants It)"
**2008** (7th)	Kreva	"Strong Style"
**2008** (7th)	Kanye West	"Stronger"
**2008** (7th)	Zeebra featuring Jesse	"Not Your Boyfriend"
**2009** (8th)	**Teriyaki Boyz featuring Busta Rhymes and Pharrell**	**"Zock On!"**
**2009** (8th)	Kreva	"Akasatanahamayarawawon" (あかさたなはまやらわをん)
**2009** (8th)	Lil' Wayne featuring Static Major	"Lollipop"
**2009** (8th)	T.I. featuring Rihanna	"Live Your Life"
**2009** (8th)	Kanye West	"Heartless"

=== 2010s ===
Year	Artist	Video
**2010** (9th)	**Kreva**	**"Speechless"**
**2010** (9th)	Eminem	"We Made You"
**2010** (9th)	Flo Rida featuring Ke$ha	"Right Round"
**2010** (9th)	Jay-Z featuring Alicia Keys	"Empire State of Mind"
**2010** (9th)	Rhymester	"Once Again"
**2011** (10th)	**Eminem**	**"Not Afraid"**
**2011** (10th)	AK-69	"Public Enemy"
**2011** (10th)	Far East Movement featuring Cataracs and Dev	"Like a G6"
**2011** (10th)	Kanye West	"Power"
**2011** (10th)	Seeda	"This Is How We Do It"
**2012** (11th)	**Kreva**	**"Kijun" (基準)**
**2012** (11th)	Drake	"Headlines"
**2012** (11th)	Jay-Z & Kanye West featuring Otis Redding	"Otis"
**2012** (11th)	Sick Team	"Street Wars"
**2012** (11th)	Tyler, The Creator	"Yonkers"
**2013** (12th)	Aklo	"Red Pill"
**2013** (12th)	AK-69	"Start It Again"
**2013** (12th)	ASAP Rocky featuring Drake, 2 Chainz and Kendrick Lamar	"Fuckin' Problems"
**2013** (12th)	Kendrick Lamar	"Swimming Pools (Drank)"
**2013** (12th)	Sauetoroyoshi featuring Ozrosaurus	"Yokohama Deer" (ヨコハマシカ)

== See also ==
- MTV Video Music Award for Best Hip-Hop Video
- MTV Europe Music Award for Best Hip-Hop
