= Tokyo Drift (Fast & Furious) =

Single by Teriyaki Boyz

from the album The Fast and the Furious: Tokyo Drift (soundtrack) and Serious Japanese
- Language: English; Japanese
- Released: June 27, 2006
- Recorded: 2005
- Genre: Hip hop
- Length: 4:15
- Label: Star Trak
- Songwriters: Keisuke Ogihara; Ryouji "Ryo-Z" Narita; Ryu Yeong-gi; Seiji Kameyama
- Producer: The Neptunes

Teriyaki Boyz singles chronology
"Heartbreaker" (2006)	"Tokyo Drift (Fast & Furious)" (2006)	"I Still Love H.E.R." (2007)

"Tokyo Drift (Fast & Furious)" is a single by Japanese hip hop group Teriyaki Boyz. It features on the 2006 film The Fast and the Furious: Tokyo Drift as the main theme and also features at the end credits. The song also appears in the band's second album Serious Japanese.

== Background ==
The song is written by band members Verbal, Wise, Ilmari and was produced by the Neptunes (Pharrell Williams and Chad Hugo). The song can also be heard in the 2006 movie when the cars are racing. The group's album Serious Japanese includes an official remix featuring American rappers Pusha T and Fam-Lay with new verses from Teriyaki Boyz.

== Composition ==
The song uses a gamelan in its instrumentals.

== Reception and legacy ==
"Tokyo Drift (Fast & Furious)" has been praised as one of the best songs from the Fast & Furious franchise as well as a "badass driving song". In 2020, Time reported on a viral trend of videos that began on TikTok depicting people "drifting" across their hardwood floors. Injury Reserve interpolates the melody in their song, "Jailbreak the Tesla". Indonesian rapper Rich Brian released a "Tokyo Drift Freestyle" during the COVID-19 pandemic that garnered media attention in the United States and Indonesia. American rapper Lil Yachty released "T.D", which heavily samples "Tokyo Drift", featuring Tierra Whack, Tyler, the Creator, and ASAP Rocky. American rapper Ski Mask the Slump God samples the song as well in "Where's the Blow?" featuring Lil Pump.

== Commercial performance ==
The song received positive reviews from critics. It was certified Gold by RIAJ, making it Teriyaki Boyz's only certified single to date.

== Charts ==
=== Weekly charts ===
Chart (2006)	Peak position
US Bubbling Under Hot 100 (Billboard)	20

Chart (2025)	Peak position
Global Japan Songs Excl. Japan (Billboard Japan)	1

== Certifications ==
Certifications for "Tokyo Drift (Fast & Furious)"
Region	Certification	Certified units/sales
Brazil (Pro-Música Brasil)	Platinum	60,000^{‡}
Germany (BVMI)	Gold	150,000^{‡}
Japan (RIAJ) Full-length ringtone	Gold	100,000^{*}
United Kingdom (BPI)	Silver	200,000^{‡}
Streaming
Japan (RIAJ)	Gold	50,000,000^{†}
^{*} Sales figures based on certification alone.^{‡} Sales+streaming figures based on certification alone.^{†} Streaming-only figures based on certification alone.
