= 2009 MTV Video Music Awards Japan =

Annual Japanese music awards ceremony

- Date: May 30, 2009
- Location: Saitama Super Arena, Saitama, Saitama, Japan
- Hosted by: Gekidan Hitori
- Website: mtvjapan.com/mvaj

Television/radio coverage
- Network: MTV Japan

The MTV Video Music Awards Japan 2009 was broadcast the 8th annual awards show on Saturday, May 30, at the Saitama Super Arena in Saitama, Saitama. Gekidan Hitori was the host of the ceremony.

== Awards ==
Winners are in bold text.

=== Video of the Year ===
Exile — "Ti Amo (Chapter2)"

- Namie Amuro — "New Look"
- Coldplay — "Viva la Vida"
- Southern All Stars — "I Am Your Singer"
- Britney Spears — "Womanizer"

=== Album of the Year ===
Mr. Children — Supermarket Fantasy

- Ayaka — Sing to the Sky
- Coldplay — Viva La Vida or Death and All His Friends
- Ne-Yo — Year of the Gentleman
- Hikaru Utada — Heart Station

=== Best Male Video ===
Kreva — "Akasatanahamayarawawon"

- Motohiro Hata — "Forever Song"
- Ne-Yo — "Closer"
- Usher featuring Young Jeezy — "Love in This Club"
- Kanye West — "Heartless"

=== Best Female Video ===
Namie Amuro — "New Look"

- Thelma Aoyama — "Nando Mo"
- Beyoncé — "If I Were a Boy"
- Britney Spears — "Womanizer"
- Hikaru Utada — "Prisoner of Love"

=== Best Group Video ===
Exile — "Ti Amo (Chapter2)"

- Franz Ferdinand — "Ulysses"
- The Killers — "Human"
- Shōnan no Kaze — "Koishigure"
- Tohoshinki — "Jumon (Mirotic)"

=== Best New Artist ===
Kimaguren — "Life"

- Duffy — "Mercy"
- Girl Next Door — "Guzen no Kakuritsu"
- Miho Fukuhara — "Change"
- Katy Perry — "I Kissed a Girl"

=== Best Rock Video ===
Maximum the Hormone — "Tsume Tsume Tsume"

- 9mm Parabellum Bullet — "Living Dying Message"
- Acidman — "I Stand Free"
- Fall Out Boy — "I Don't Care"
- Franz Ferdinand — "Ulysses"

=== Best Pop Video ===
Katy Perry — "I Kissed a Girl"

- Lily Allen — "The Fear"
- Ikimono-gakari — "Kimagure Romantic"
- Perfume — "Dream Fighter"
- Rip Slyme — "Taiyou to Bikini"

=== Best R&B Video ===
Namie Amuro — "Sexy Girl"

- Akon — "Right Now (Na Na Na)"
- Juju featuring Spontania — "Sunao ni Naretara"
- Miliyah Kato — "19 Memories"
- Ne-Yo — "Miss Independent"

=== Best Hip-Hop Video ===
Teriyaki Boyz featuring Busta Rhymes and Pharrell — "Zock On!"

- Kreva — "Akasatanahamayarawawon"
- Lil' Wayne featuring Static Major — "Lollipop"
- T.I. featuring Rihanna — "Live Your Life"
- Kanye West — "Heartless"

=== Best Reggae Video ===
Han-Kun — "Hotter Than Hot"

- Kardinal Offishall featuring Akon — "Dangerous"
- Mighty Jam Rock — "U.P. Star"
- Natty — "Cold Town"
- Ryo the Skywalker — "Ever Green"

=== Best Dance Video ===
Towa Tei featuring Miho Hatori — "Mind Wall"

- The Brighton Port Authority featuring David Byrne and Dizzee Rascal — "Toe Jam"
- Dan Le Sac vs. Scroobius Pip — "Thou Shalt Always Kill"
- Kraak & Smaak featuring Ben Westbeech — "Squeeze Me"
- Ukawanimation! featuring Takkyū Ishino and Kenichi Hagiwara — "Wakusei no Portrait 5 Okuman Gaso"

=== Best Video from a Film ===
Remioromen — "Yume no Tsubomi" (from Kansen Retto)

- Ai — "Okuribito" (from Departures)
- Madonna featuring Justin Timberlake and Timbaland — "4 Minutes" (from Get Smart)
- Monobright — "Ano Toumeikan to Shonen" (from After School)
- Jack White and Alicia Keys — "Another Way to Die" (from Quantum of Solace)

=== Best Collaboration ===
Nelly and Fergie — "Party People"

- Madonna featuring Justin Timberlake and Timbaland — "4 Minutes"
- Scha Dara Parr + Kaela Kimura — "Hey! Hey! Alright"
- T.I. featuring Rihanna — "Live Your Life"
- Anna Tsuchiya featuring AI — "Crazy World"

=== Best Karaokee! Song ===
Kimaguren — "Life"

- Aqua Timez — "Niji"
- Mariah Carey — "Touch My Body"
- Coldplay — "Viva La Vida"
- Funky Monkey Babys — "Kibou no Uta"

== Special awards ==
=== MTV Street Icon Award ===
Beastie Boys

=== MTV Best Choreography Award ===
Exile

== Live performances ==
- The Black Eyed Peas — "Boom Boom Pow"
- BoA and Sean Garrett — "I Did It for Love"
- Ciara — "Love Sex Magic"
- Exile (featuring Bach Logic) — "Touch The Sky"
- Green Day — "Know Your Enemy"
- Katy Perry — "Hot n Cold"
- Remioromen — "Sakura"
- 9mm Parabellum Bullet — "Living Dying Message"

=== Red carpet live ===
- AAA — "Jamboree!! / Music!!!"
- Kimaguren
- Metro Station — "Shake It"

== Guest celebrities ==
- Acidman
- AI
- Alan
- Thelma Aoyama
- Big Bang
- Blue Man Group
- DJ Caroline D'Amore
- Crystal Kay
- Cyril
- Nana Eikura
- Girl Next Door
- Yuna Ito
- DJ Kaori
- Natsuki Katō
- Kreva
- Meisa Kuroki
- Maximum the Hormone
- Minmi
- Nigo and Verbal (from Teriyaki Boyz)
- Misako Sakazune
- Shota Shimizu
- Shōnan no Kaze
- Special Others
- Nana Tanimura
- Triple H
- Michelle McCool
- W-inds
- Kanako Yanagihara

== See also ==
- 50th Japan Record Awards
