= T.D (song) =

Song by Lil Yachty and Tierra Whack featuring ASAP Rocky and Tyler, the Creator

from the album Lil Boat 3
- Released: May 29, 2020
- Genre: Trap
- Length: 3:53
- Label: Motown; Quality Control
- Songwriters: Miles McCollum; Tierra Whack; Rakim Mayers; Tyler Okonma; Samuel Gloade; Pharrell Williams; Keisuke Ogihara; Ryo-Z; Seiji Kameyama; Verbal
- Producers: 30 Roc; Lil Yachty

"T.D" is a song by American rappers Lil Yachty and Tierra Whack featuring fellow American rappers ASAP Rocky and Tyler, the Creator. It was released as the fourth track on the former's fourth studio album Lil Boat 3 (2020). The track received critical acclaim and peaked at number 83 on the Billboard Hot 100. It marks Tierra Whack’s first and only chart entry so far.

== Background ==
The track is Tierra Whack's first collaboration with the three other rappers and Yachty and Tyler's first collaboration together, though Rocky and Tyler have collaborated multiple times before, most notably "Who Dat Boy". Yachty and Rocky have also collaborated previously, on the song "Bachelor" from the ASAP Mob's Cozy Tapes Vol. 1: Friends.

== Composition ==
The track samples the song "Tokyo Drift" from the Fast & Furious movie of the same name.

== Critical reception ==
The track received critical acclaim. Alex Zidel of HotNewHipHop called the song a "freestyle-driven banger", and said that Lil Yachty starting off "utilized the Tokyo Drift instrumental to perfection". He said that ASAP Rocky and Tyler, the Creator "dropped bars", and Tierra Whack had "some memorable lines" before Lil Yachty closed out the track. He stated that the track feels "like it was crafted in the studio with all of them trying to outclass one another", and it was "a little bit like they were assigned a group project and, for once, everyone pulled their weight". Andrew Sacher of BrooklynVegan called the song an "exciting posse cut". He said that Rocky's verse was "acid-drenched", and Tyler's verse was "a gritty, hard-hitting verse that sooner recalls his early days than his most recent album", but said that Tierra "steals the show". Robin Murray of Clash called the track a "standout" on the album.

== Charts ==
Chart (2020)	Peak position
New Zealand Hot Singles (RMNZ)	11
US Billboard Hot 100	83
US Hot R&B/Hip-Hop Songs (Billboard)	34
