= Rip Slyme =

Japanese hip hop group

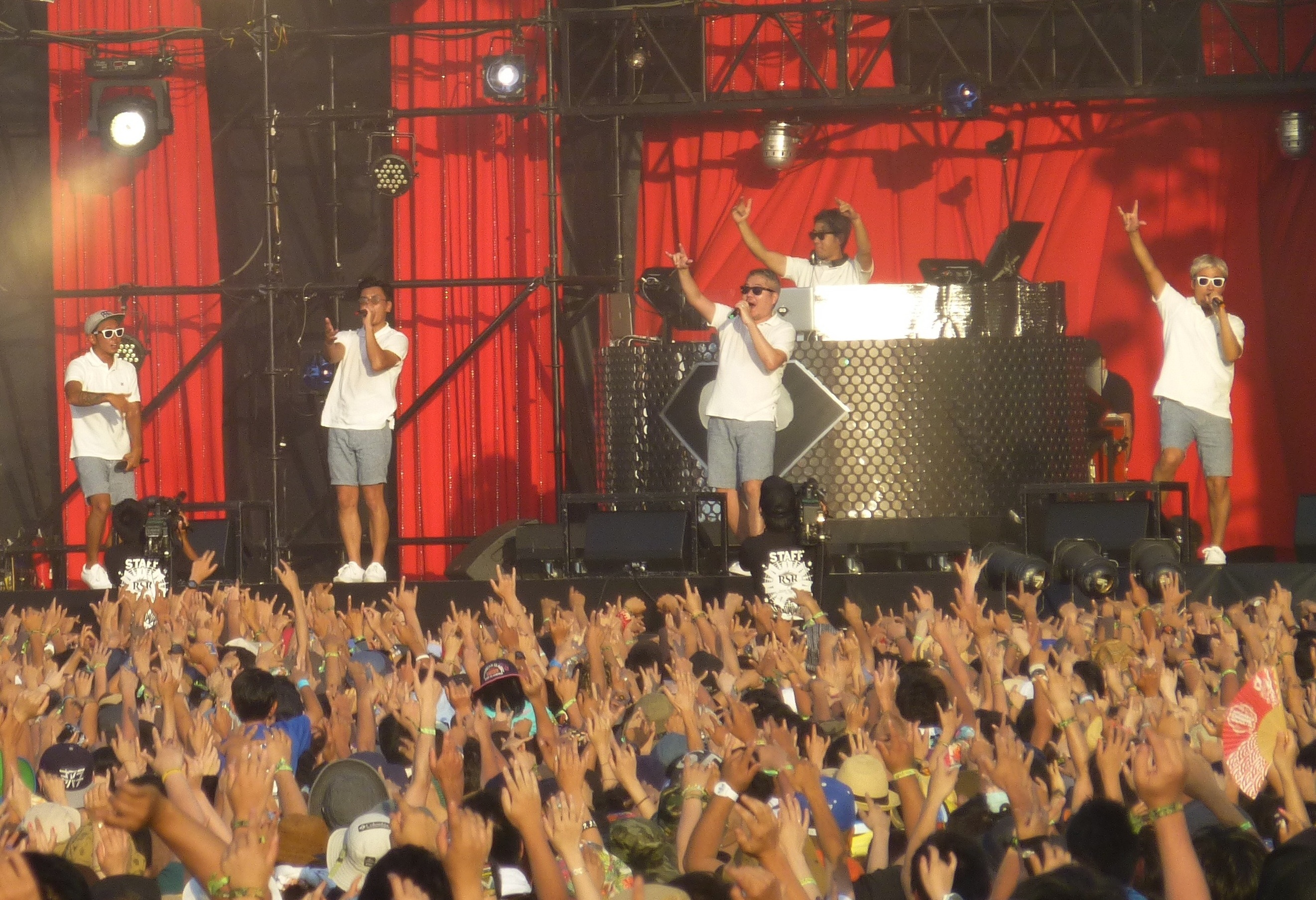
- Rip Slyme in 2016

Background information
- Origin: Kanagawa, Japan
- Genre: Hip hop
- Years active: 1994–2018; 2021–present
- Label: Warner Music Japan
- Member of: Funky Grammar Unit
- Members: Ryouji "Ryo-Z" Narita; Ilmari; DJ Fumiya; Pes; Su
- Past members: DJ Shige; DJ Shouji
- Website: ripslyme.com

Rip Slyme (often stylized all uppercase) is a Japanese hip hop group composed of four MCs (Ryouji "Ryo-Z" Narita, Ilmari, Pes and Su) and a DJ, Fumiya. Their sound is influenced by old-school hip hop and other western rappers such as the Pharcyde, De La Soul, Public Enemy, Jurassic 5, the Beastie Boys, DJ Premier and Leaders of the New School.

During their career, they have released two indie albums, ten major albums, one live album, one indies collection, and three best-of albums. They released six singles as an indie act, and 17 with a major label.

On October 31, 2018, the group announced that they were suspending all activities. This announcement came six months after a tabloid alleged that Su was cheating on his wife and the group started conducting activities without him. Rip Slyme’s website has since shut down. Pes left the group as well in November 2017, but this was unknown to the general public until October 2021.

On April 15, 2021, Rip Slyme, now the trio of Ryo-Z, Ilmari & Fumiya, returned with the first of what was said to be five monthly singles, "Human Nature". In April 2025, they announced that Pes and Su would be rejoining and the group would perform again as a five-piece until March of 2026.

== Career ==
The group was formed in 1994 by Ryo-Z and Ilmari, who were later joined by Pes (he attended the same school as Ilmari). The Rip in Rip Slyme stands for their initials. Slime was a popular children's toy at that time. Their name is also a pun on the phrase "lips' rhyme". After winning an amateur rapping contest "Young MCs In Town", they started their musical career with a guest spot on fellow Japanese rap group Mellow Yellow's 1995 album Mellow Yellow Baby, and the release of their first album Lips Rhyme the same year. In 1997, DJ Fumiya (who had studied under East End X Yuri's DJ Yoggy) joined the group, and in 1998, Su (previously a backup dancer for East End X Yuri), joined during recording of their second album, "Talkin' Cheap", which was released later that year. In the years following this album release, Rip Slyme also took part in Dragon Ash's Total Communication event.

Becoming more successful, they signed to Warner Music Group in 2000. By then they had released several indie singles including their EP "Underline No. 5" and "Mata Au Hi Made" which had received the help of Fantastic Plastic Machine. "Mata Au Hi Made" was released on Warner Music Group's Indies label. Their first major single was "Stepper's Delight" released 22 March 2001. The title was a play on the Sugarhill Gang's "Rapper's Delight".

In general, Fumiya composes most of the music, while Ryo-Z, Pes, Ilmari, and Su write their own lyrics. However, before Fumiya became a member, Pes composed most of the songs. Each member has tried their hand at composing music for Rip Slyme, and Pes occasionally played guitar on some tracks (Such as Home and More & More, for example). Allegedly, Pes was in a rock band before being introduced to hip hop music by Ilmari and Ryo-Z.

In 2002, they received MTV Video Music Awards Japan for "Best Newcomer" and "Best Hip-hop Group".

The same year they released a big-budget album "Tokyo Classic", which became Japan's first million-selling hip-hop album, with a sound compared to James Brown's soul and funk. Two singles from the album, "Funkastic" and "Rakuen Baby" collected MTV awards in 2003. "Super Shooter", featured as a B-side to their single "Galaxy", is also the theme song for the anime Gantz.

From late 2005 (after the release of Good Job! in August) through 2006, DJ Fumiya took an extended break, citing illness. For performances, a friend of the band, DJ Soma, was a stand-in. Fumiya returned to activity for concerts in late summer 2006, and for the Rip Slyme release, Epoch.

On 7 July 2007, Rip Slyme performed their single "Nettaiya" at Live Earth in Kyoto, Japan. Later that year, they would go on to release their fifteenth major single, "Speed King", and their seventh Warner album, Funfair, shortly after.

In summer 2008, they released "Taiyou to Bikini". Later that year, three digital singles would debut, all of which would be on the February 2009 single "Stairs". Rip Slyme released their eighth album, Journey, on June 10, 2009.

Rip Slyme has provided voiceover work as well as new ending theme for the Japanese dub of SpongeBob SquarePants, replacing the original ending theme. The first episode was first used on April 1, 2009, and was used until 2019.

In 2010, Rip Slyme was one of the artists launched on Warner Music's new sublabel, unBORDE.

They provided the theme song for the Japanese release for Despicable Me, "Good Times (Bad Times remix)".

The theme song for the Japanese version of Teenage Mutant Ninja Turtles is "Secret de Onegaishimasu" by them.

In October 2021, during the group's hiatus, Pes announced that he had quietly parted ways with Rip Slyme in November 2017 and stated that "a reunion would be difficult" due to the tensions he had with the other members.

From 2022 to 2024, the group reunited, released new music, and performed live as a three-piece, now with two stand ins for the retired members: Wise, with whom Ryo-Z and Ilmari already collaborated in Teriyaki Boyz, performing for Su, as well as Emi Okamoto from Friends replacing Pes. In April 2025, however, they announced that they would be reuniting with the original five-person lineup until March 22, 2026, the twenty-fifth anniversary of their major debut.

== Side projects ==
Ilmari formed a short lived group with Kj and BOTS of Dragon Ash, and Shigeo of Skebo King called Steady & Co. The group released their debut album Chambers in 2001. Ilmari and Ryo-Z along with Wise, Verbal of M-Flo, and Nigo the founder of A Bathing Ape formed a super group known as Teriyaki Boyz. The Teriyaki Boyz released two albums: Beef or Chicken (2005) and Serious Japanese (2009). In 2012, Ilmari formed a Hip-Hop/Rock band the Beatmoss with Kosen, Yas, and Sohnosuke. The group released two albums: The Beatmoss Vol. 1 (2012) and The Beatmoss Vol. 2 (2013). Pes released his first solo album, Suteki na Koto in 2012.

== Members ==
- Ryo-Z: Ryouji Narita (成田亮治 Narita Ryouji), born July 15, 1974
- Ilmari: Keisuke Ogihara (荻原恵介 Ogihara Keisuke), b. June 17, 1975
- DJ Fumiya: Fumiya Takeuchi (竹内文也 Takeuchi Fumiya), b. March 14, 1979
- Pes: Masatsugu Chiba (千葉昌嗣 Chiba Masatsugu), b. December 27, 1976
- Su: Kazuto Otsuki (大槻一人 Kazuto Ootsuki), b. November 20, 1973

== Discography ==
- Talkin' Cheap (1998)
- Five (2001)
- Tokyo Classic (2002)
- Time to Go (2003)
- Masterpiece (2004)
- Epoch (2006)
- Funfair (2007)
- Journey (2009)
- Star (2011)
- Golden Time (2013)
- 10 (2015)

=== Other albums and songs ===
- Superliminal (M-Flo, 2026), song: "Arigatto" (as m-flo loves Rip Slyme)

== Awards and nominations ==
2002

- MTV Video Music Awards Japan – Best Hip Hop Artist (Winner)
- MTV Video Music Awards Japan – Best New Artist (Winner)
- MTV Video Music Awards Japan – Best Live Performance

2003

- MTV Video Music Awards Japan – Video of the Year – "Rakuen Baby" (Winner)
- MTV Video Music Awards Japan – Best Group Video – "Rakuen Baby" (Winner)
- MTV Video Music Awards Japan – Best Hip Hop Video – "Funktastic" (Winner)
- MTV Video Music Awards Japan – Album of the Year – Tokyo Classic

2004

- MTV Video Music Awards Japan – Best Group Video – "Joint"
- MTV Video Music Awards Japan – Best Hip Hop Video – "Joint"
- MTV Video Music Awards Japan – Best buzzASIA Japan – "Joint"

2006

- MTV Video Music Awards Japan – Best Collaboration Video – Hotei x Rip Slyme – "Battle Funkastic" (Winner)

2007

- MTV Video Music Awards Japan – Best Collaboration Video – Quruli feat. Rip Slyme – "Juice"

2008

- MTV Video Music Awards Japan – Best Hip Hop Video – "I.N.G" (Winner)
- MTV Video Music Awards Japan – Best Group Video – "I.N.G"

2009

- MTV Video Music Awards Japan – Best Pop Video – "Taiyou to Bikini"

== See also ==
- Da Pump – Japanese boy band
- Halcali – Japanese musical duo
- Kaela Kimura – Japanese rock singer and model (born 1984)
- Rhymester (group) – Japanese hip-hop group
- Speed – Japanese female vocal/dance group
