= Int'l After School =

- Genre: Clothes and fashion show
- Directed by: ?
- Presented by: Wise and Cute
- Country of origin: Japan
- Original languages: English and Japanese

Production
- Producer: ?
- Camera setup: Multicamera setup
- Running time: 30 minutes

Original release
- Network: NHK
- Release: 2011 – present

Int'l After School is an English-language entertainment and pop-culture-focused programme broadcast on Japan based NHK World. It is hosted by MC Wise of Teriyaki Boyz and the members of Cute.
