= I Still Love H.E.R. =

Single by Teriyaki Boyz featuring Kanye West

from the album Serious Japanese
- Released: January 24, 2007
- Recorded: 2007
- Genre: J hip hop
- Length: 5:13
- Label: (B)APE Sounds; Def Jam
- Songwriters: Ryu Yeong-gi; Seiji Kameyama; Keisuke Ogihara; Ryouji" Ryo-Z" Narita; Kanye West
- Producer: Kanye West

Teriyaki Boyz singles chronology
"HeartBreaker" (2006)	"I Still Love H.E.R." (2007)	"Zock On!" (2008)

Kanye West singles chronology
"Wouldn't Get Far" (2007)	"I Still Love H.E.R." (2007)	"Classic (Better Than I've Ever Been)" (2007)

"I Still Love H.E.R." is a song by J-hip-hop group, Teriyaki Boyz released as the first single from their studio album Serious Japanese. The single features vocals and production from American rapper Kanye West. The track references the 1994 single "I Used to Love H.E.R.," a classic rap song which personified hip-hop as a woman and former love interest, made by West's label mate Common.

== Music video ==
The music video for "I Still Love H.E.R." is essentially a parody of the popular video sharing site YouTube. The video is in fact a video clip, apparently uploaded onto TeriyakiTube, of the Teriyaki Boyz and Kanye West rapping to the song. The members are seen wearing A Bathing Ape sweatshirts while West dons the brand's shark hoodie and a TROOP jacket. The live-action portion of the music video is intercut with still-frame animated scenes of West's mascot Dropout Bear along with cartoon versions of Verbal, Wise, Ilmari, and Ryo-Z in a red convertible trying to woo an attractive woman. The clip ends with H.E.R. hopping into the car and riding off with Dropout and the Teriyaki Boyz before transiting to a black scene which lists the two options "share" or "watch again."

== Track listing ==
1. "I Still Love H.E.R." (featuring Kanye West)
2. "HeartBreaker" (FULL PHAT REMIX)
3. "I Still Love H.E.R." (featuring Kanye West) (Instrumental)
