= Work That =

Work That may refer to:

- "Work That" (Mary J. Blige song), 2007
- "Work That" (Teriyaki Boyz song), 2009
- "Work That", a song by Megan Thee Stallion from her 2020 album Good News
