= I Know Nigo! =

Studio album by Nigo
- Released: March 25, 2022
- Length: 32:49 (streaming version)
- Label: Victor Victor; Republic
- Producer: Nigo; ASAP Rocky; Axl; BoogzDaBeast; Brandon Finessin; Carter Lang; Cubeatz; Hector Delgado; Hozay Beats; Kanye West; Luca Starz; Pharrell Williams; Reddoe Beats; ThaMyind; The Neptunes; Tyler, the Creator; Westen Weiss

Nigo chronology
| Ape Sounds (2000) | I Know Nigo! (2022) |

Singles from I Know Nigo!
- 1. "Arya" Released: January 28, 2022; 2. "Want It Bad" Released: February 18, 2022; 3. "Hear Me Clearly" Released: March 4, 2022; 4. "Morë Tonight" Released: March 14, 2022; 5. "Heavy" Released: March 18, 2022

I Know Nigo! (stylized as I Know NIGO!) is the second studio album by Japanese fashion designer and record producer Nigo. It was released through Republic Records and Victor Victor Worldwide on March 25, 2022. The album contains guest appearances from ASAP Rocky, Tyler, the Creator, Clipse, Pharrell Williams, Gunna, Kid Cudi, Teriyaki Boyz, ASAP Ferg, the late Pop Smoke, and Lil Uzi Vert. Production was handled by Nigo himself, ASAP Rocky, Tyler, the Creator, Pharrell Williams (solo and as part of the Neptunes with Chad Hugo), Hector Delgado, Carter Lang, Westen Weiss, Kanye West, BoogzDaBeast, Luca, Starz, ThaMyind, Hozay Beats, Reddoe Beats, Cubeatz, Brandon Finessin, and Axl. A hip hop album, I Know Nigo! serves as Nigo's first studio release since his debut album, Ape Sounds (2000).

== Singles ==
The lead single of the album, "Arya", a collaboration with American rapper ASAP Rocky, was released on January 28, 2022. The second single, "Want It Bad", a collaboration with American rapper Kid Cudi, was released on February 18, 2022. The third single, "Hear Me Clearly", a collaboration with American rapper Pusha T, was released on March 4, 2022. The fourth single, "Morë Tonight", a collaboration with Japanese hip hop group Teriyaki Boyz (which Nigo is the DJ of), was released on March 14, 2022. The fifth and final single, "Heavy", a collaboration with American rapper Lil Uzi Vert, was released on March 18, 2022.

== Critical reception ==
Professional ratings
Review scores
| Source | Rating |
|---|---|
| AllMusic | 3/5 stars |
| CommMedia | 7/10 |
| Pitchfork | 7.1/10 |

Writing for Pitchfork, Mehan Jayasuriya felt that "the beats are as sturdy and tuneful as you'd expect but not as adventurous as you might hope", adding that "I Know NIGO! is a fun project and its marquee names largely deliver but it serves to further fortify Nigo's legacy rather than pay it forward". Rolling Stone writer Jeff Ihaza called the album "a collaborative testament to the genuine admiration Nigo has earned for himself in the world of hip-hop", describing it as "one of the most fun rap albums of the year".

== Track listing ==
I Know Nigo! track listing
| No. | Title | Writer(s) | Producer(s) | Length |
|---|---|---|---|---|
| 1. | "Lost and Found Freestyle 2019" (with ASAP Rocky and Tyler, the Creator) | Rakim Mayers; Tyler Okonma; Pharrell Williams; Chad Hugo; Stayve Thomas; Clifford Harris, Jr.; Bernard Freeman; Leroy Williams; Clarence Reid; Clinton Mansell; Micah Troy; Donnell Price; Sammie Norris; Willie Clarke | Nigo; The Neptunes | 2:54 |
| 2. | "Arya" (with ASAP Rocky) | Mayers; Hector Delgado; Carter Lang; Westen Weiss | Nigo; ASAP Rocky; Delgado; Lang; Weiss | 2:42 |
| 3. | "Punch Bowl" (with Clipse) | Terrence Thornton; Gene Thornton; P. Williams | Nigo; The Neptunes | 3:01 |
| 4. | "Functional Addict" (with Pharrell Williams and Gunna) | P. Williams; Sergio Kitchens | Nigo; P. Williams | 3:25 |
| 5. | "Want It Bad" (with Kid Cudi) | Scott Mescudi; P. Williams | Nigo; P. Williams | 3:18 |
| 6. | "Morë Tonight" (with Teriyaki Boyz) | Keisuke Ogihara; Ryu Yeong-gi; Seiji Kameyama; Ryo-Z; P. Williams | Nigo; P. Williams | 3:36 |
| 7. | "Paper Plates" (with Pharrell Williams and ASAP Ferg) | P. Williams; Darold Ferguson | Nigo; P. Williams | 2:33 |
| 8. | "Hear Me Clearly" (with Pusha T) | T. Thornton; Ye; Jahmal Gwin; Luca Starz; Lawrence Berment; William Roberts II; Shawn Carter; Leigh Elliott; John Stephens; Johnny Mollings; Leonardo Mollings; Rennard East | Nigo; Kanye West; BoogzDaBeast; Starz; ThaMyind | 2:21 |
| 9. | "Remember" (with Pop Smoke) | Bashar Jackson; Kiesa Ellestad; Samir Jose Reynoso-Contreras; Angel Orozco | Nigo; Hozay Beats; Reddoe Beats | 2:15 |
| 10. | "Heavy" (with Lil Uzi Vert) | Symere Woods; Tim Gomringer; Kevin Gomringer; Brandon Veal; Manalla Abdul-Aziz | Nigo; Cubeatz; Brandon Finessin; Axl | 3:19 |
| 11. | "Come On, Let's Go" (with Tyler, the Creator) | Okonma; P. Williams | Nigo; Tyler, the Creator; P. Williams | 3:19 |
| Total length: | | | | 32:49 |

Notes

- The CD version of the album is 7 tracks long compared to the streaming version, which is 11 tracks long. The CD version excludes the tracks "Lost and Found Freestyle 2019", "Functional Addict", "Paper Plates", and "Come On, Let's Go" on the album.
- "Punch Bowl", "Morë Tonight", and "Come On, Let's Go" features additional vocals by Pharrell Williams
- "Morë Tonight" features additional vocals by Shurland Ayers
- "Come On, Let's Go" features additional vocals by Reign Judge

Sample credits

- "Lost and Found Freestyle 2019" contains samples from "3 Kings", written by Stayve Thomas, Clifford Harris, Jr., Bernard Freeman, Leroy Williams, Clarence Reid, Clinton Mansell, Micah Troy, Donnell Price, Sammie Norris, and Willie Clarke, as performed by Slim Thug, which itself samples "Secretary", written by Reid and Clarke, as performed by Betty Wright; and samples from "Like a Boss", written by Thomas, Pharrell Williams, and Chad Hugo, also performed by Slim Thug.
- "Hear Me Clearly" contains interpolations from "Free Mason", written by William Roberts II, Shawn Carter, Leigh Elliott, John Stephens, Johnny Mollings, Leonardo Mollings, and Rennard East, as performed by Rick Ross.
- "Remember" contains samples from "Sound of a Woman", written by Kiesa Ellestad and Rami Samir Afuni, as performed by Kiesza.

== Charts ==
Chart performance for I Know Nigo!
| Chart (2022) | Peak position |
|---|---|
| Australian Albums (ARIA) | 89 |
| Belgian Albums (Ultratop Flanders) | 170 |
| Canadian Albums (Billboard) | 21 |
| Lithuanian Albums (AGATA) | 21 |
| New Zealand Albums (RMNZ) | 34 |
| US Billboard 200 | 13 |
| US Top R&B/Hip-Hop Albums (Billboard) | 6 |
