= The Fast and the Furious: Tokyo Drift (soundtrack) =

2006 soundtrack album

The Fast and the Furious: Tokyo Drift (Original Motion Picture Soundtrack)

Soundtrack album by various artists
- Released: June 20, 2006
- Studio: Ape Sounds
- Length: 45:30
- Label: Universal Motown
- Producers: Justin Lin (exec.); Kathy Nelson (exec.); Neal H. Moritz (exec.); The Neptunes; Brian Tyler

Singles from The Fast and the Furious: Tokyo Drift
- 1. "Tokyo Drift (Fast & Furious)" Released: June 27, 2006

Professional ratings
Review scores
Source	Rating
AllMusic	3/5 stars
RapReviews	2/10
IGN	6.9/10

The Fast and the Furious: Tokyo Drift (Original Motion Picture Soundtrack) is the soundtrack album to Justin Lin's 2006 action film The Fast and the Furious: Tokyo Drift. It was released on June 20, 2006 via Universal Motown. It features contributions from Don Omar, Teriyaki Boyz, Atari Teenage Riot, Brian Tyler, DJ Shadow, Dragon Ash, Evil Nine, Far East Movement, Mos Def, N.E.R.D., Tego Calderón and The 5.6.7.8's.

== Track listing ==
No.	Title	Writer(s)	Producer(s)	Length
1.	"Tokyo Drift" (Teriyaki Boyz)	Keisuke Ogihara; Ryouji Narita; Ryu Young Ki; Seiji Kameyama	The Neptunes	4:15
2.	"Six Days (Remix)" (DJ Shadow featuring Mos Def)	Josh Davis; Brian Farrell; Dennis Olivieri	DJ Shadow	3:53
3.	"The Barracuda" (The 5.6.7.8's)	Bernice Williams	The 5.6.7.8's	2:28
4.	"Restless" (Evil Nine)	Tom Beaufoy; Patrick Pardy; Garvin Edwards	Pat Pardy	4:56
5.	"Round Round" (Far East Movement)	Jae Choung; James Roh; Kevin Nishimura; Robert Daniels; Stefon Taylor		3:21
6.	"She Wants to Move" (N⋆E⋆R⋆D)	Pharrell Williams; Chad Hugo	The Neptunes	3:35
7.	"Cho Large" (Teriyaki Boyz featuring Pharrell Williams)	Williams; Ogihara; Narita; Young Ki; Kameyama	The Neptunes	5:15
8.	"Resound" (Dragon Ash featuring HIDE, 136)	Kenji Furuya; Hide	Dragon Ash	4:09
9.	"Speed" (Atari Teenage Riot)	Alec Empire	David Harrow	2:50
10.	"Bandoleros" (Don Omar featuring Tego Calderón)	William Omar Landrón; Tego Calderón; Armando Rosario; Paul Irizarry	Echo and Diesel	5:07
11.	"Conteo" (Don Omar)	Landrón; LaRon James	Josias de la Cruz; Naldo	3:18
12.	"Mustang Nismo" (Brian Tyler featuring Slash)	Brian Tyler	Brian Tyler	2:23
Total length:				45:30

== Other songs ==
"Bawitdaba" by Kid Rock plays during the first race in the film with Lucas Black's character Sean Boswell racing against Zachery Ty Bryan's character Clay. "Ooh Ahh (My Life Be Like)" by GRITS featuring Toby Mac was featured in the film during a scene with Bow Wow's character Twinkie; the song was originally released on the group's 2002 album "The Art of Translation" and was later remixed by Liquid Beat. Shonen Knife's cover of The Carpenters' "Top of the World" begins a scene where Sean and Neela sit to eat noodles together. "You'll Be Under My Wheels" by The Prodigy was used to lead into the film's end credits. "There it Go" by Juelz Santana was used to introduce the scene in Han's garage. None were included on the film's official soundtrack.

== Charts ==
Chart (2006)	Peak position
Austrian Albums (Ö3 Austria)	8
Belgian Albums (Ultratop Flanders)	51
Belgian Albums (Ultratop Wallonia)	72
French Albums (SNEP)	79
German Albums (Offizielle Top 100)	25
Malaysian International Albums (RIM)	18
Swiss Albums (Schweizer Hitparade)	14

== Certifications ==
Region	Certification	Certified units/sales
Germany (BVMI)	Gold	100,000^{‡}
^{‡} Sales+streaming figures based on certification alone.

== Film score ==
The Fast and the Furious: Tokyo Drift (Original Score)

Film score by Brian Tyler
- Released: June 27, 2006
- Genre: Film score
- Length: 64:10
- Label: Varèse Sarabande
- Producer: Brian Tyler

Brian Tyler chronology
Annapolis (2006)	The Fast and the Furious: Tokyo Drift (Original Score) (2006)	Partition (2007)

The Fast and the Furious: Tokyo Drift (Original Score) was released on June 27 via Varèse Sarabande, a week after Original Motion Picture Soundtrack. It was recorded at Todd-AO Scoring Stage, composed and conducted by Brian Tyler and performed by the Hollywood Studio Symphony.

All music is composed by Brian Tyler.

No.	Title	Composer	Length
1.	"Touge"	Brian Tyler	0:46
2.	"The Fast And The Furious: Tokyo Drift"	Brian Tyler	7:05
3.	"Saucin'"	Brian Tyler	4:28
4.	"Neela Drifts"	Brian Tyler	3:27
5.	"Preparation"	Brian Tyler	1:10
6.	"N2O"	Brian Tyler	0:49
7.	"Mustang Nismo" (featuring Slash)	Brian Tyler	2:21
8.	"Underground"	Brian Tyler	1:33
9.	"Hot Fuji"	Brian Tyler	1:55
10.	"This Is My Mexico"	Brian Tyler	1:23
11.	"Welcome To Tokyo" (featuring Slash)	Brian Tyler	1:54
12.	"DK VS Han"	Brian Tyler	3:32
13.	"Downtown Tokyo Chase"	Brian Tyler	2:33
14.	"Aftermath"	Brian Tyler	1:22
15.	"Empty Garage"	Brian Tyler	1:01
16.	"DK's Revenge"	Brian Tyler	1:09
17.	"Journey Backwards"	Brian Tyler	0:58
18.	"Sumo"	Brian Tyler	1:37
19.	"Sean's Crazy Idea"	Brian Tyler	2:24
20.	"Dejection"	Brian Tyler	1:12
21.	"Kamata"	Brian Tyler	1:32
22.	"Two Guns"	Brian Tyler	1:29
23.	"I Gotta Do This"	Brian Tyler	1:14
24.	"Megaton"	Brian Tyler	2:16
25.	"Neela Confronts DK"	Brian Tyler	1:47
26.	"Winner ... Gets ... Me"	Brian Tyler	1:21
27.	"War Theory"	Brian Tyler	1:54
28.	"I Don't Need You To Save Me"	Brian Tyler	0:57
29.	"Neela"	Brian Tyler	1:44
30.	"Symphonic Touge"	Brian Tyler	6:50
Total length:			1:04:10
