= Work That! =

Single by Teriyaki Boyz featuring Pharrell and Chris Brown

from the album Serious Japanese
- Released: January 14, 2009
- Recorded: 2008
- Genre: Pop rap
- Length: 4:59
- Label: Star Trak
- Songwriters: Keisuke Ogihara; Ryouji Narita; Ryu Yeong-gi; Seiji Kameyama; Pharrell Williams
- Producer: The Neptunes

Teriyaki Boyz singles chronology
"Zock On!" (2008)	"Work That!" (2009)	"いつも It's More" (2009)

Pharrell singles chronology
"I Apologize" (2009)	"Work That!" (2009)	"Blanco" (2009)

Chris Brown singles chronology
"Freeze" (2008)	"Work That!" (2009)	"Better on the Other Side" (2009)

"Work That!" is the third single from Japanese hip-hop group Teriyaki Boyz's studio album Serious Japanese. The song features Pharrell and Chris Brown.

== Composition ==
AllMusic editor Adam Greenberg described the song as a "Chris Brown-heavy" track "with its mix of Daft Punk-style backing tracks and Dirty South edge."

== Charts ==
"Work That!" peaked at number 7 on the Billboard Japan Hot 100 chart on the chart week of January 27, 2009.

Chart (2008)	Peak position
Japan Hot 100 (Billboard)	7
