= Billionaire Boys Club (clothing retailer) =

American fashion label

- Type: Private
- Industry: Fashion
- Founded: 2003; 23 years ago
- Founder: Pharrell Williams; Nigo; Rob Walker
- Headquarters: 7 Mercer St, New York City, U.S.
- Number of locations: 4 store locations (New York City, Miami, London, Tokyo)
- Area served: United States, United Kingdom, Japan
- Products: Apparel, footwear, fashion accessories
- Website: http://www.bbcicecream.com/

Billionaire Boys Club (BBC) is an American fashion label based in New York City founded by Pharrell Williams and Nigo in 2003. Its sublabels include Ice Cream, Bee Line and Billionaire Girls Club.

== History ==
In 2003, singer Pharrell Williams and his manager Rob Walker partnered with fashion designer and A Bathing Ape creator Nigo, and Japanese graphic designer, Sk8thing to create Billionaire Boys Club. The brand is credited with helping popularize streetwear's visibility in high fashion.

Billionaire Boys Club debuted in Williams' 2003 "Frontin'" music video. In 2004, Ice Cream, originally a subsidiary of Billionaire Boys Club, unveiled its skate-centric footwear line, licensed by Reebok. Ice Cream graphics feature all-over print motifs of beepers, dollar signs and diamonds. A year later, Billionaire Boys Club branched out from its online origin, setting up a store in Tokyo, Japan and later expanding to New York and London.

In August 2011 rapper Jay-Z, a frequent collaborator of Williams, partnered with the Billionaire Boys Club line. Later the rapper, through a joint venture with Iconix, invested in the brand. The following year BBC recorded high $25 million to $30 million in volume, up from $12 million. Williams reacquired Iconix's stake in the business in 2017.

BBC has several sublabels, including Billionaire Girls Club for women and Bee Line, a collaboration with Mark McNairy.

In 2023, the brand opened a store in Paris, in a boutique styled like a retro American diner.

== Locations ==
Billionaire Boys Club has an American flagship store in SoHo, New York City, a European flagship store in Soho, London has now permanently closed, and a store in Tokyo, Japan. Several stores that retail Billionaire Boys Club and Ice Cream clothing exist across North America, Europe, Asia and the Middle East.
