= Zock On! =

Single by Teriyaki Boyz featuring Pharrell and Busta Rhymes

from the album Serious Japanese
- Released: March 19, 2008
- Recorded: 2007
- Genre: Hip-hop
- Length: 4:03
- Label: Star Trak
- Songwriters: Keisuke Ogihara; Ryouji Narita; Ryu Yeong-gi; Seiji Kameyama; Pharrell Williams; Trevor Smith
- Producer: The Neptunes

Teriyaki Boyz singles chronology
"I Still Love H.E.R." (2007)	"Zock On!" (2008)	"Work That!" (2009)

Pharrell singles chronology
"I Know" (2008)	"Zock On!" (2008)	"My Drive Thru" (2008)

"Zock On!" is a song by Japanese hip-hop group Teriyaki Boyz, released as the second single from their second studio album Serious Japanese. It was produced by The Neptunes and features Pharrell and Busta Rhymes. According to Verbal in an interview with DJ Semtex, the beat co-produced by Pharrell was initiated solely using buckets.

The song reached number 16 on the Oricon Singles Chart for the week of March 20, 2008.

== Track listing ==
1. "Zock On!" – 4:03
2. "I Still Love H.E.R." (Low Jack Three Remix) – 5:11
3. "Zock On!" (Instrumental) – 4:02
4. "I Still Love H.E.R." (Low Jack Three Remix) [Instrumental] – 5:13

== Charts ==
Chart (2008)	Peak position
Japan Weekly Singles (Oricon)	16
