= Nigo =

Japanese fashion designer and musician

Nigo ニゴー
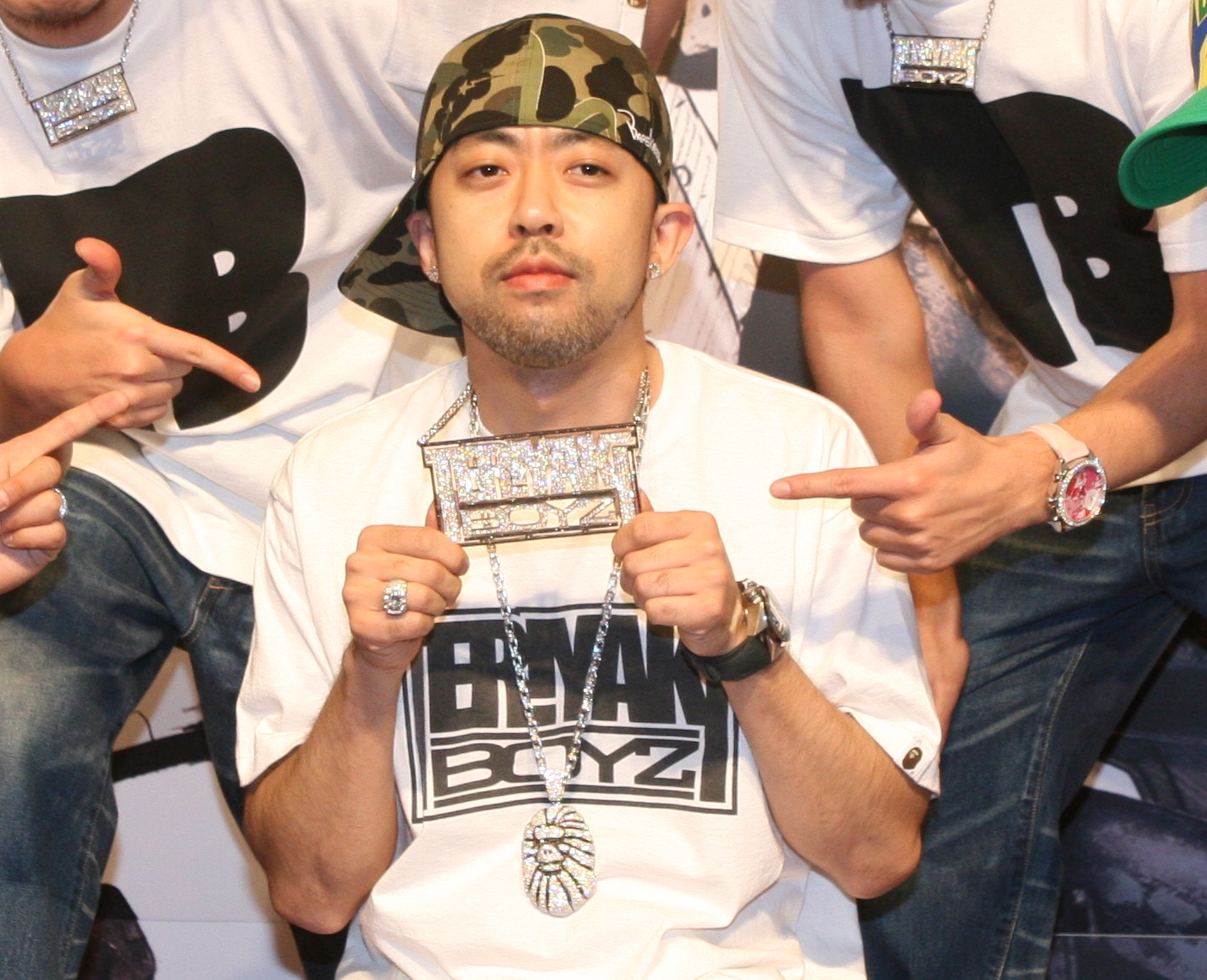
- Nigo, 2006

Background information
- Also known as: Nigo®
- Born: Tomoaki Nagao (長尾 智明); December 23, 1970 (age 55)
- Origin: Maebashi, Japan
- Occupations: Fashion designer; DJ; record producer; entrepreneur
- Years active: 1993–present
- Labels: Mo' Wax; Toy's Factory; Victor Victor; Republic
- Member of: Teriyaki Boyz; Honest Boyz
- Formerly of: Tokyo Sex Pistols
- Website: humanmade.jp

Nigö (ニゴー, Nigō; born Tomoaki Nagao (長尾 智明) on December 23, 1970) is a Japanese fashion designer, disc jockey (DJ), record producer and entrepreneur. He is best known as the creator of the streetwear brand, A Bathing Ape (Bape), and currently serves as artistic director for Kenzo. Additionally, he is a member of the Japanese group Teriyaki Boyz, serving as their official in-house DJ since the group's 2005 debut.

== Fashion background ==
Nigo's venture into fashion started when he founded A Bathing Ape in 1993. Hiroshi Fujiwara is considered his mentor. He initially sold a few Bape Hoodies and T-shirts and camouflage print hoodies in a small store, items which became very popular among teenagers. In 2002, Nigo released the Bapesta sneaker, which according to BBC presenter Jonathan Ross, later became the "epitome of collectable footwear". The sneaker resembles Nike's Air Force 1 design, but instead of the swoosh on the side, it has Nigo's Bapesta logo, a star with a lightning bolt extending out of it. In the cover news of the April issue of the trend magazine WWD for Japan, Bape's boss Nigo (formerly known as Tomoaki Nagao) announced plans to depart the company alongside Takahashi UC (Undercover) designer Jun Takahashi. Nowhere, established on April 1, 1993, no longer served as the designer of Bape. In 2003, Nigo partnered with Pharrell Williams to create and launch the streetwear brands Billionaire Boys Club and Ice Cream footwear. Nigo also established his personal new company Nigold on April 4, 2009. In 2010, he launched his new brand Human Made. In 2013, Nigo left Bape for good. In 2014, Nigo became the creative director for Uniqlo's UT brand. In 2020, Nigo partnered with Luxury brand Louis Vuitton alongside Virgil Abloh to create a capsule collection. In September 2021, Kenzo appointed Nigo as its new artistic director. In July 2023, Australian winery Penfolds appointed Nigo as its Creative Partner of two years.

== Musical and entertainment background ==
Nigo's first involvement with music was playing in punk cover band Tokyo Sex Pistols while at university, alongside fellow fashion figures Hiroshi Fujiwara, Jun Takahashi and Hikaru Iwanaga. Nigo collaborated with James Lavelle, creating a compilation called A Bathing Ape vs Mo Wax, which was released in Japan in 1997. He would go on to join forces with Lavelle's project, U.N.K.L.E., and Scratch Perverts, to release the single Ape Shall Never Kill Ape, in 1998. The following year saw the Japanese release of Nigo's debut album, Ape Sounds, on which he showcased a blend of trip-hop, dub, indie rock, and psychedelic pop. The album featured contributions from Ben Lee, Money Mark, Shawn Lee and Cornelius. It was released internationally by Mo Wax in 2000. Nigo subsequently released a number of non-album singles, which included collaborations with Rakim and Flavor Flav, as well as compilations Ape Sounds Remix, (B)APE Sounds, and Return of the Ape Sounds.

Soon after the establishment of Billionaire Boys Club, Nigo formed rap group Teriyaki Boyz alongside Ilmari, Ryo-Z, Verbal, and Wise. The group released the albums Beef or Chicken in 2005 and Serious Japanese in 2009, respectively.

Nigo has been associated with popular rap and hip hop artists such as Kanye West and Pharrell Williams. He is the DJ of Teriyaki Boyz and is also owner of Bape Sounds record label. He also has an MTV Japan show which he created called Nigoldeneye.

Together with BiS manager Watanabe Junnosuke, Nigo was the producer and manager for the female pop group Billie Idle. His involvement with the group began in 2014, when he directed a music video for BiS' song "Nerve", and after the group disbanded, Nigo and Watanabe offered BiS members First Summer Uika and Hirano Nozomi the chance to join their new project, Billie Idle. The group debuted in 2014 with the album Idle Gossip, for which Nigo is the executive producer. Billie Idle would go on to release a further four albums before disbanding in 2019.

On April 15, 2016, the Japanese company LDH announced that a new hip-hop unit named Honest Boyz would be produced as a joint project of Nigo and EXILE and Sandaime J Soul Brothers member Naoto since they had been long term friends and often worked on designing clothes together. The group would be composed of 4 rappers: Naoto, who was also the assigned leader, M-flo member Verbal, Exile and Generations member Sekiguchi Mandy and Gekidan Exile and Doberman Infinity member Sway. Nigo would act as the producer and DJ of the unit. The group's name is an homage to "Teriyaki Boyz" that Nigo and Verbal were part of together. On June 25, the unit debuted with the digital single "Part Time Hero". The song was used as the opening theme song for the drama Night Hero Naoto, which stars member Naoto. On November 7, 2017, they released their second digital single "Yo!". On February 5, 2018, the unit released their third digital single "HeartBreakerZ" featuring Crazyboy. On June 6, they released their fourth digital single "Bepping Sound" featuring Hiroomi Tosaka. In November of the same year, the unit released a music video for the unreleased song "Tokyo Dip" featuring American artist Pharrell Williams on their official YouTube channel. The collaboration came to be due to the friendship between Nigo and Pharrell, with Pharrell producing the song and participating on vocals. The music video, directed by Nigo, was shot in Shibuya and Nakameguro, and also features cameo appearances by Sano Reo and Iwata Takanori. On March 6, 2019, they released their first CD single "Sakura" featuring the duo Kobukuro. The single's title track is a reconstruction of Kobukuro's hit song "Sakura" with a hip-hop approach. In 2019, the unit provided the unreleased song "Electricity" featuring American hip-hop artist Lil Uzi Vert as the ending theme of the movie Detective Pikachu. On March 20, 2024, the unit released their first studio album HBZ digitally. Prior to the release, the lead song "Toy Boy" featuring Dean Fujoka was pre-released digitally on February 28.

On January 28, 2022, Nigo and ASAP Rocky released the song "Arya", serving as the lead single for Nigo's album, I Know Nigo!, released via Victor Victor Worldwide and Republic Records on March 25, 2022. It marks Nigo's first solo album since 2005's Nigo Presents: Return of the Ape Sounds. I Know Nigo! was co-executive produced by Nigo alongside Pharrell Williams. Williams and Nigo had first collaborated nearly two decades earlier, when the Neptunes contributed production to Beef or Chicken. The album's second single, titled "Want It Bad", was released in collaboration with American musician Kid Cudi. The album includes guest appearances from Tyler, the Creator, Clipse, Gunna, Teriyaki Boyz, ASAP Ferg, Pusha T, Lil Uzi Vert, and the late Pop Smoke.

== Art collector ==
Nigo met artist Kaws in 1996 and became an early supporter of his work. In 2005, he commissioned him a painting and Kaws painted the Kaws Album. The painting was sold in 2019 for $14.8 million at Sotheby's in Hong Kong among other artworks. The total of the sales of his art collection was $28 million.

He also worked with Futura, Stash, Hajime Sorayama, and André Saraiva. In 2026, he launched the "Nigo: From Japan with Love" in collaboration with the Design Museum in London. It was his first retrospective outside of Japan, with over 700 objects from early pieces and personal artefacts to recent work.

== Miscellaneous ==
- Nigo speaks little or no English and uses a translator whenever he does interviews.
- Nigo has a cameo appearance in the Takashi Murakami short film Akihabara Majokko Princess shown at the "Pop Life" exhibition at Tate Modern in London.

== Discography ==
=== Studio albums ===
List of studio albums, with selected details and chart positions
Title	Details	Peak chart positions					
Title	Details	AUS	BEL (FL)	CAN	NZ	US	US R&B/HH
Ape Sounds	Released: September 11, 2000; Label: Mo' Wax, Toy's Factory; Format: CD, LP	—	—	—	—	—	—
I Know Nigo!	Released: March 25, 2022; Label: Republic, Victor Victor; Formats: CD, LP, digital download, streaming	89	170	21	29	13	6

=== Singles ===
==== As lead artist ====
List of singles with chart positions
Title	Year	Peak chart positions		Album
Title	Year	NZ Hot	US Bub.	Album
"Arya" (with ASAP Rocky)	2022	8	—	I Know Nigo!
"Want It Bad" (with Kid Cudi)	2022	20	—	I Know Nigo!
"Hear Me Clearly" (with Pusha T)	2022	—	—	I Know Nigo!
"More Tonight" (with Teriyaki Boyz)	2022	—	—	I Know Nigo!
"Heavy" (with Lil Uzi Vert)	2022	23	14	I Know Nigo!
"—" denotes a recording that did not chart or was not released in that territory.

==== Other charted songs ====
List of charted songs, with selected chart positions
Title	Year	Peak chart positions				Album
Title	Year	CAN	NZ Hot	US Bub.	US R&B/HH	Album
"Lost and Found Freestyle 2019" (with ASAP Rocky and Tyler, the Creator)	2022	89	12	6	40	I Know Nigo!
"Come On, Let's Go" (with Tyler, the Creator)	2022	—	7	4	35	I Know Nigo!
"—" denotes releases that did not chart or were not released in that region.

== Awards ==
- 2005 Style Award, MTV Asia Awards
- 2020 Fashion Designer of the Year Award, GQ Japan Men of the Year 2020

== See also ==
- Star Trak Entertainment
- N*E*R*D
