= Steady & Co. =

Japanese musical group

- Origin: Tokyo, Japan
- Genres: Alternative, Reggae, Hip Hop, Drum and Bass, J-pop
- Years active: 2001
- Label: Warner Music
- Past members: Kenji Furuya; Bots; Ilmari; Shigeo
- Website: steadyandco.com/

Steady & Co., was a Japanese hip hop and music production group consisting of Kenji Furuya, Bots, both of Dragon Ash, Ilmari of Rip Slyme, and Shigeo of Skebo King.

== Discography ==
=== Studio albums ===
- (2001) Chambers

=== Singles ===
- (2001) "Stay Gold"
- (2001) "Shunkashūtō"
- (2001) "Only Holy Story"

== See also ==
- Dragon Ash
- Rip Slyme
