= Rhymester (group) =

Japanese hip-hop group

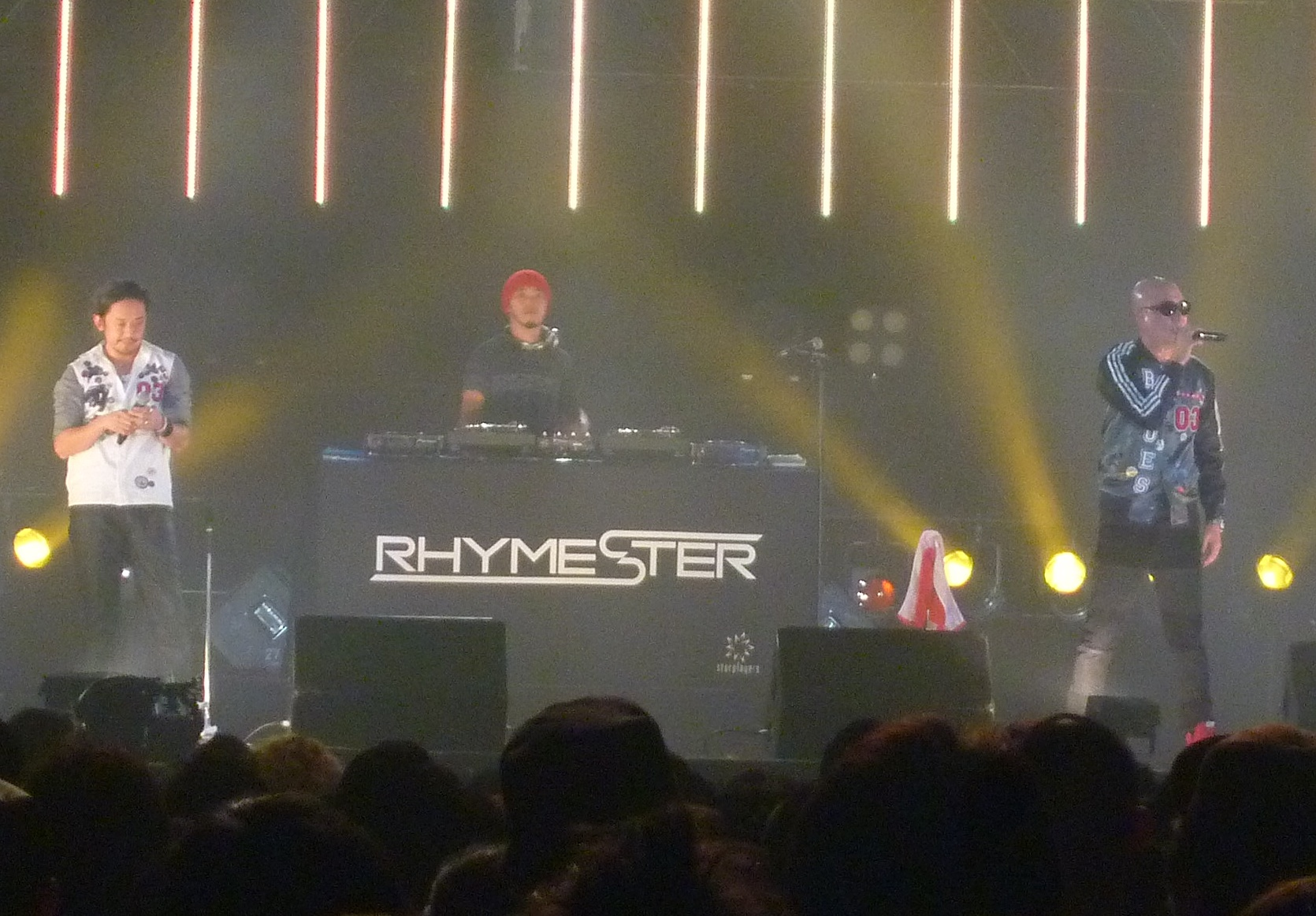
- Rhymester performing live, 2011

Background information
- Origin: Yokohama, Kanagawa, Japan
- Genres: Hip hop J-pop
- Years active: 1989–present
- Labels: File Records (1999–2000); Ki/oon Records (2001–2014); Victor Entertainment (2014-present)
- Member of: Funky Grammar Unit
- Spinoffs: Scha Dara Parr; Karano Rhymester
- Members: Daisuke Sakama (Mummy-D); Jin Yamamoto (DJ Jin); Shirō Sasaki (Utamaru)
- Past members: Dr. Looper; DJ Chocolate; Master-T; Kodama-chang; DDD (Dara Dara Dancers)
- Website: Official website

Rhymester (ライムスター, Raimu Sutā) is a Japanese hip hop group consisting of MCs Mummy-D and Utamaru, and DJ Jin.

== History ==
The group was formed in 1989 and is one of the oldest Japanese hip hop acts. They debuted on an independent label in 1993 with the EP Ore ni Iwaserya (俺に言わせりゃ), which was panned by critics. Later on, they released several studio albums and gradually became popular among both hip hop and rock fans, as they frequently collaborated with rock musicians such as Kiyoshiro Imawano. In 2001, the group made their major label debut when they signed onto Ki/oon Records, a sublabel of Sony Music Entertainment Japan. On March 3, 2007, the group performed solo at the Nippon Budokan, almost 20 years after their original debut.

The single "Heat Island" featuring "Fire Ball" was featured in the anime series Ayakashi: Samurai Horror Tales. Rhymester has released several songs such as "B-Boyism" (B-BOYイズム), "Mimi wo Kasubeki" (耳ヲ貸スベキ), "King Of Stage", "Nikutai-Kankei" (肉体関係) and more.

Utamaru was featured in Like a Dragon: Infinite Wealth, playing a character with the same name and likeness.

== Members ==
1989–present

- Mummy-D (MC, producer)
- Utamaru (宇多丸) (MC)
- DJ Jin (DJ, producer)

Former members

- Dr.Looper
- DJ Chocolate
- Master-T
- Kodama-chang
- The DDD (Dara Dara Dancers)

== Discography ==
=== Independent releases ===
==== Singles ====
- "Plus Alpha" (December 28, 1995)
- "Mimi wo Kasubeki" (耳ヲ貸スベキ) (October 30, 1996)
- "B-Boyism" (B-Boyイズム) (May 15, 1998)
- "King of Stage" (キング オブ ステージ) (1999)

==== Studio albums and EPs ====
- Ore ni Iwaserya (俺に言わせりゃ) (April 25, 1993)
- Egotopia (June 25, 1995)
- Respect (リスペクト) (July 20, 1999)
- Respect-Kai (リスペクト改) (February 26, 2000)

=== Major releases ===
==== Singles ====
- "Royal Straight Flush" (ロイヤル・ストレート・フラッシュ) (2001)
- "Uwasa no Shinsō feat. F.O.H" (ウワサの真相 feat.F.O.H) (2001)
- "Nikutai-Kankei feat. Crazy Ken Band" (肉体関係 part2 逆feat.クレイジーケンバンド) (2002)
- "This Y'all That Y'all session with Super Butter Dog" (2002)
- "Gennama ni Karada wo Hare" (現金(げんなま)に体を張れ) (2003)
- "The Great Amateurism" (ザ・グレート・アマチュアリズム) (2003)
- "Welcome 2 My Room" (2004)
- "Tōsō no Funk" (逃走のファンク) (2005)
- "Heat Island" feat. Fire Ball (2006)
- "Once Again" (2009)
- "Once Again EP" (2010)
- "Walk This Way" (2010)
- "The Choice Is Yours" (2012)
- "Ningen Kōsaten (人間交差点)/Still Changing" (2015)

==== Studio albums and EPs ====
- Uwasa no Shinsō (ウワサの真相) (December 19, 2001)
- Uwasa no Bansō (ウワサの伴奏 ~And The Band Played On~) (October 23, 2002)
- Grey Zone (グレイゾーン) (February 4, 2004)
- Heat Island (March 8, 2006)
- Manifesto (February 3, 2010)
- Pop Life (March 2, 2011)
- Flashback, Natsu (フラッシュバック、夏。) (July 27, 2011)
- Dirty Science (ダーティーサイエンス) (January 30, 2013)
- Bitter, Sweet & Beautiful (July 29, 2015)

==== Compilation albums ====
- Made in Japan (メイドインジャパン ~The Best of Rhymester~) (January 1, 2007)
- Best Bouts (ベストバウト ~16 Rounds Featuring Rhymester~) (February 23, 2007)
- The R: The Best of Rhymester (September 24, 2014)

==== Video albums ====
- King of Stage (キングオブステージ) (VHS 1999, DVD 2002)
- King of Stage Vol.4 (VHS&DVD 2002)
- King of Stage vol.5 (King of Stage vol.5 〜グレイゾーン・リリース・ツアー 2004〜) (2004)
- King of Stage: Grey Zone Release Tour Final (キング・オブ・ステージ Vol.4 〜ウワサの真相リリースツアー〜ファイナル) (2004)
- Made in Japan: The Best of Rhymester – The Videos (March 28, 2007)
- I Say Yeah! NeOSITE 10th Anniversary Party@Shibuya AX (February 21, 2007)
- King of Stage vol.7: Made in Japan at Budokan (King of Stage Vol.7〜メイドインジャパン at 日本武道館〜) (December 5, 2007)

==== Collaborations ====
- Circles (2013) (with Soil & "Pimp" Sessions)
