= Keisuke Ogihara =

Japanese rapper

Ilmari イルマリ
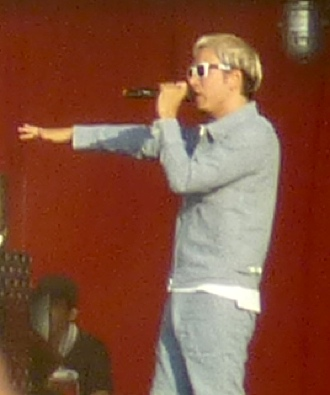
- Ilmari in 2016

Background information
- Born: Ogihara Ilmari Keisuke (荻原イルマリ恵介); June 17, 1975 (age 51); Helsinki, Finland
- Origin: Tokyo, Japan
- Genre: Hip hop
- Occupations: Rapper; songwriter
- Member of: Rip Slyme; Teriyaki Boyz; The Beatmoss
- Spouse: Yuri Ebihara (m. 2010)

Keisuke Ilmari Ogihara (荻原イルマリ恵介, Ogihara Irumari Keisuke) (born June 17, 1975), known mononymously as Ilmari, is a Japanese rapper and member of the hip hop group Rip Slyme.

== Career ==
Ilmari attended the same primary and middle school as Ryo-Z. During this, they became the founding members of Rip Slyme. After relocating schools, Ilmari then left to seek international schooling. While studying internationally, he met fellow Rip Slyme member Pes. Quitting school in the middle of his final year, he returned to Tokyo, reunited with Ryo-Z and formed "Gibinibanko" (ギビニバンコ).

Ilmari returned to Finland in 2002 along with his group members and favourite camp counsellor, Andrew Busam, where they shot photos and footage for their shortcuts! DVD and their photobook RIP STYLE, and performed live in Helsinki.

Ilmari's beatboxing is featured in several concerts and with Kei in the song "By the Way" on their TOKYO CLASSIC album.

In 2005, GAP held their 10th Anniversary campaign. Ilmari was chosen (as were BoA & Hiro of Exile) as models for displaying their individual style.

=== Collaborations ===
Ilmari created the short-lived group Steady&Co in 2001 with BOTS and Kenji Furuya of Dragon Ash and SHIGEO of Skebo King. Their aim was to create a much lighter folk influenced form of hip hop against emerging genres such as J-Urban. In 2004, Ilmari helped launch singer Salyu by collaborating with her to release "Valon" under the name IlmarixSalyu. In 2005, he was made leader of the unit Teriyaki Boyz consisting of fellow Rip Slyme rapper Ryo-Z, Nigo, Wise and Verbal of M-Flo. In 2012 Ilmari formed a rap rock band with KOSEN, YAS and SOHNOSUKE called The Beatmoss.

== Personal life ==
Ilmari was born on June 17, 1975, in Helsinki, Finland to a Finnish mother and a Japanese father. He is best known by his stage name Ilmari (イルマリ), which is considered to be his middle name in Finland.

With his sister Elisa, Ilmari owns a Japanese restaurant called Len's Keishoku Bar in Helsinki.

In early 2010, actress Yuri Ebihara announced a romantic relationship with Ilmari, and the two announced their marriage in May of the same year. Their son was born in 2015, and daughter in 2021.

== Discography ==
With Rip Slyme

With Steady & Co.

- Chambers (2001)

With Teriyaki Boyz

- Beef or Chicken (2005)
- Serious Japanese (2009)

With The Beatmoss

- The Beatmoss Vol. 1 (2012)
- The Beatmoss Vol. 2 (2013)
