= Serious Japanese =

Studio album by Teriyaki Boyz
- Released: February 3, 2009
- Genre: Hip-hop
- Length: 57:10
- Label: Star Trak
- Producer: Ad-Rock; Cornelius; Jermaine Dupri; Kanye West; Mark Ronson; The Neptunes; Supa Dave West; Towa Tei

Teriyaki Boyz chronology
Beef or Chicken (2005)	Serious Japanese (2009)

Singles from Serious Japanese
- 1. "I Still Love H.E.R." Released: 2007; 2. "Zock On!" Released: 2008; 3. "Work That!" Released: 2009; 4. "いつも It's More" Released: 2009

Professional ratings
Review scores
Source	Rating
AllMusic	3.5/5 stars

Serious Japanese is the second and final studio album by Japanese hip-hop supergroup Teriyaki Boyz. Released through Star Trak Entertainment on February 3, 2009, it peaked at number 3 on the Oricon Albums Chart.

== Track listing ==
No.	Title	Producer(s)	Length
1.	"Please Come Intro!"	Ad-Rock	1:46
2.	"Work That!" (featuring Pharrell and Chris Brown)	The Neptunes	4:48
3.	"After 5 (A.M.)" (featuring Mademoiselle Yulia)	Towa Tei	3:32
4.	"Tokyo Drift"	The Neptunes	4:15
5.	"Sweet Girl" (featuring Dondria)	Jermaine Dupri	4:19
6.	"Teriyaking" (featuring Kanye West and Big Sean)	Kanye West	5:50
7.	"5th Element" (featuring Cornelius)	Cornelius	5:43
8.	"Serious Japanese"	Mark Ronson	3:34
9.	"Zock On!" (featuring Pharrell and Busta Rhymes)	The Neptunes	4:03
10.	"(Can't) 'Bake' That 'Fape'" (featuring Takagikan and Ad-Rock)	Ad-Rock	6:26
11.	"いつも It's More"	Supa Dave West	3:51
12.	"I Still Love H.E.R. (Album Mix)" (featuring Kanye West)	Kanye West	5:10
13.	"Get the Hell Outro"	Ad-Rock	0:53
14.	"Tokyo Drift (Fast & Furious) Remix" (featuring Pusha T and Fam-Lay)	The Neptunes	3:00

== Charts ==
Chart	Peak position
Japanese Albums (Oricon)	3
