= Teriyaki Boyz =

Japanese hip hop group

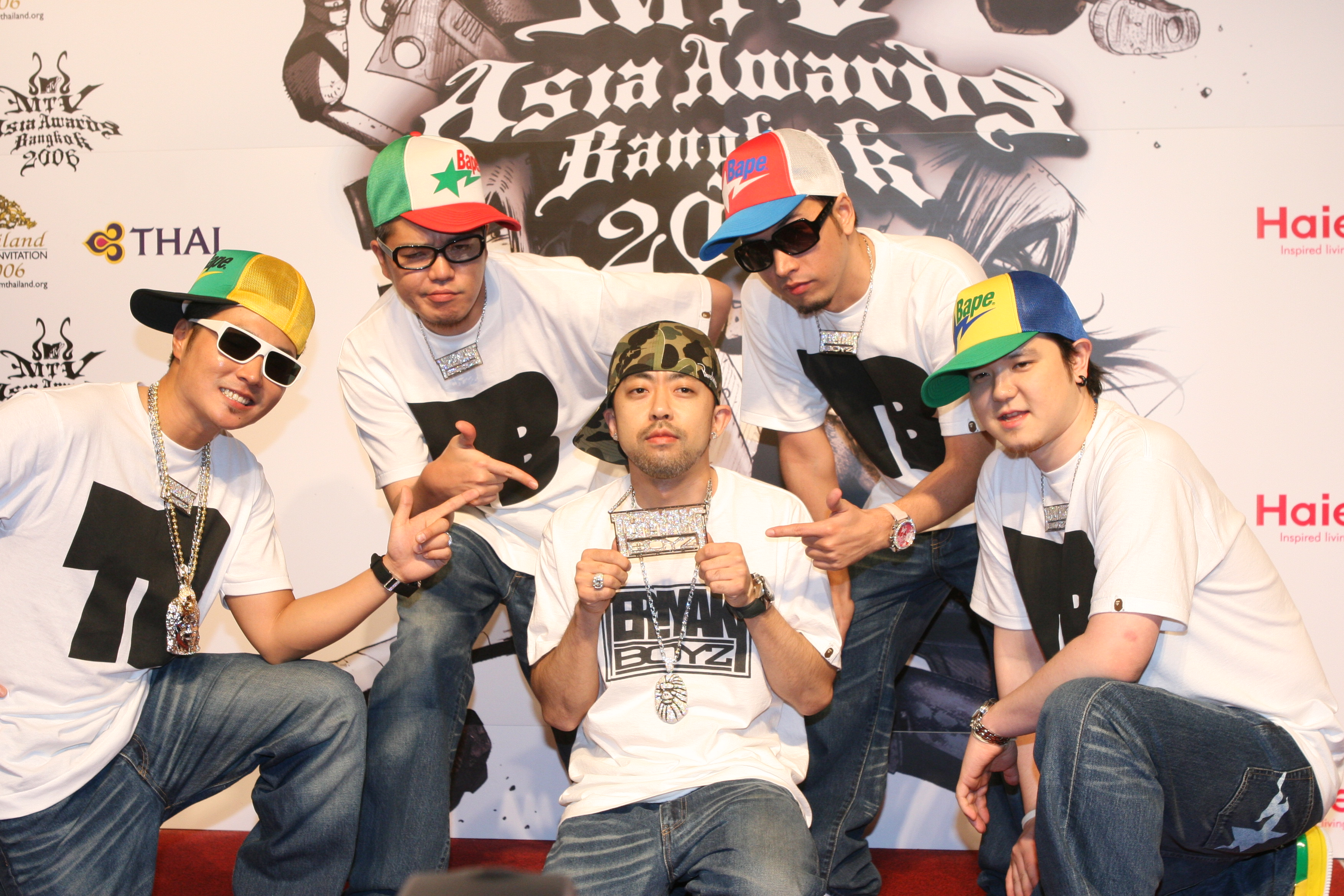
- Teriyaki Boyz in Bangkok, Thailand

Background information
- Origin: Yokohama, Japan
- Genre: Hip-hop
- Years active: 2005–2009; 2022
- Labels: Def Jam; (B)APE Sounds; Star Trak
- Members: Ilmari; Ryouji "Ryo-Z" Narita; Verbal; Wise; Nigo
- Website: teriyakiboyz.com (archived)

Teriyaki Boyz are a Japanese hip hop supergroup from Yokohama, Japan.

== History ==
The group consists of Ilmari and Ryo-Z from Rip Slyme, Verbal from M-Flo, rapper Wise and Nigo, the DJ and founder of the popular Japanese streetwear brand A Bathing Ape. The group's members regularly wear the clothing line in live performances and music videos.

Their debut album from Def Jam Recordings and (B)APE Sounds, titled Beef or Chicken was produced by an array of rap and electronica producers including Ad-Rock of the Beastie Boys, Cornelius, Cut Chemist, Daft Punk, Dan the Automator, DJ Premier, DJ Shadow, Just Blaze, Mark Ronson, and The Neptunes. Their first single, "HeartBreaker," was produced by Daft Punk and contains elements of the Daft Punk song "Human After All". The group has gone on to collaborate with renowned rap artists Kanye West, Jay-Z, Pharrell, Busta Rhymes, and Big Sean for their subsequent singles.

Two tracks by the Teriyaki Boyz were featured on The Fast and the Furious: Tokyo Drift soundtrack, the title track "Tokyo Drift", and "超 L A R G E" featuring Pharrell, which had previously been released on their debut album.

== Discography ==
=== Studio albums ===
List of albums, with selected chart positions
Title	Album details	Peak positions		Sales (JPN) (Note: Sales provided by Oricon database and are rounded to the nearest thousand copies.)	Certifications
Title	Album details	JPN	TWN East Asian	Sales (JPN)	Certifications
Beef or Chicken	Released: November 16, 2005 (JPN); Label: Def Jam Japan/(B)APE Sounds; Formats: CD, digital download	4	19	101,000	RIAJ: Gold
Serious Japanese	Released: January 28, 2009 (JPN); Label: Star Trak; Formats: CD, CD/DVD, digital download	3	—	44,000	
"—" denotes items that did not chart.

=== Mixtapes ===
List of albums, with selected chart positions
Title	Album details	Peak positions	Sales (JPN)
Title	Album details	JPN	Sales (JPN)
Delicious Japanese	Mix-tape and video album set, featuring footage from the Do You Like Japan? tour; Released: December 2, 2009 (JPN); Label: Def Jam Japan/(B)ape Sounds; Formats: CD/DVD, digital download	41	5,000

=== Singles ===
List of singles, with selected chart positions
Title	Year	Peak chart positions			Certifications	Album
Title	Year	JPN Oricon	JPN Hot 100 (Note: Sources for chart positions are as follows: "Zock On!", "Work That", "Itsumo It's More".)	US Bub.	Certifications	Album
"HeartBreaker"	2005	—	—	—		Beef or Chicken
"Tokyo Drift"	2006	—	—	20	RIAJ (cellphone): Gold; RIAJ (streaming): Gold	The Fast and the Furious: Tokyo Drift (soundtrack)
"I Still Love H.E.R." (featuring Kanye West)	2007	12	—	—		Serious Japanese
"Zock On!" (featuring Pharrell and Busta Rhymes)	2008	16	4	—		Serious Japanese
"Work That!" (featuring Pharrell and Chris Brown)	2009	18	7	—		Serious Japanese
"Itsumo It's More" (いつも IT’S MORE; "It's Always More")	2009	—	24	—		Serious Japanese
"Even More" (featuring Minami from Iyse)	2009	—	—	—		Delicious Japanese
"—" denotes items that did not chart, were ineligible to chart due to a lack of a physical single release, or were released before the creation on the Japan Hot 100 in 2008.

=== Other appearances ===
List of guest appearances that feature Teriyaki Boyz
Title	Year	Album
"Kamikaze 108"	2004	Nigo (B)ape Sounds
"Chō Large" (超LARGE; "Really Large")	2006	The Fast and the Furious: Tokyo Drift (soundtrack)
"Möre Tonight"	2022	I Know NIGO!

=== Video albums ===
List of media, with selected chart positions
Title	Album details	Peak positions
Title	Album details	JPN
The Official Delivery Icchō DVD (デリバリイッチョウ)	Released: March 29, 2006 (JPN); Label: Def Jam Japan/(B)ape Sounds; Formats: DVD	26
World Tour	Released: March 19, 2008 (JPN); Label: Def Jam Japan/(B)ape Sounds; Formats: DVD	55
