= Beef or Chicken? =

Studio album by Teriyaki Boyz
- Released: November 16, 2005
- Genre: Hip-hop
- Length: 53:17
- Labels: (B)APE Sounds; Def Jam
- Producers: Ad-Rock; Cut Chemist; Cornelius; Daft Punk; Dan the Automator; DJ Premier; DJ Shadow; Just Blaze; Mark Ronson; Michael "5000" Watts; The Neptunes

Teriyaki Boyz chronology
Beef or Chicken? (2005)	Serious Japanese (2009)

Singles from Beef or Chicken
- 1. "HeartBreaker" Released: 2006

Professional ratings
Review scores
Source	Rating
The Japan Times	favorable
Metropolis	favorable
Nichi Bei Times	favorable

Beef or Chicken? is the debut studio album by Japanese hip-hop supergroup Teriyaki Boyz. It was released through (B)APE Sounds and Def Jam Recordings on November 16, 2005. It peaked at number 4 on the Oricon Albums Chart.

== Track listing ==
No.	Title	Producer(s)	Length
1.	"Eat Intro"	Ad-Rock	1:24
2.	"The Takeover"	Mark Ronson	4:02
3.	"HeartBreaker"	Daft Punk	4:14
4.	"Celebrity Death Match"	Dan the Automator	3:25
5.	"School of Rock"	Cut Chemist	4:49
6.	"超 L A R G E" (featuring Pharrell)	The Neptunes	5:16
7.	"Shout Out for Delivery"	Ad-Rock	2:04
8.	"Moon the World"	Cornelius	5:02
9.	"今夜はバギーパンツ"	Just Blaze	4:17
10.	"Beef or Chicken"	Ad-Rock	3:20
11.	"You Know What Time Is It!?"	DJ Premier	4:32
12.	"Kamikaze 108 (Toridoshi Mix)"	DJ Shadow	4:14
13.	"Take Outro"	Ad-Rock	0:41
14.	"Kamikaze 108 (Swisha House Remix)"	Michael "5000" Watts	5:57

== Charts ==
Chart	Peak position
Japanese Albums (Oricon)	4
