= Wise (rapper) =

Japanese rapper

Seiji Kameyama 亀山晴児
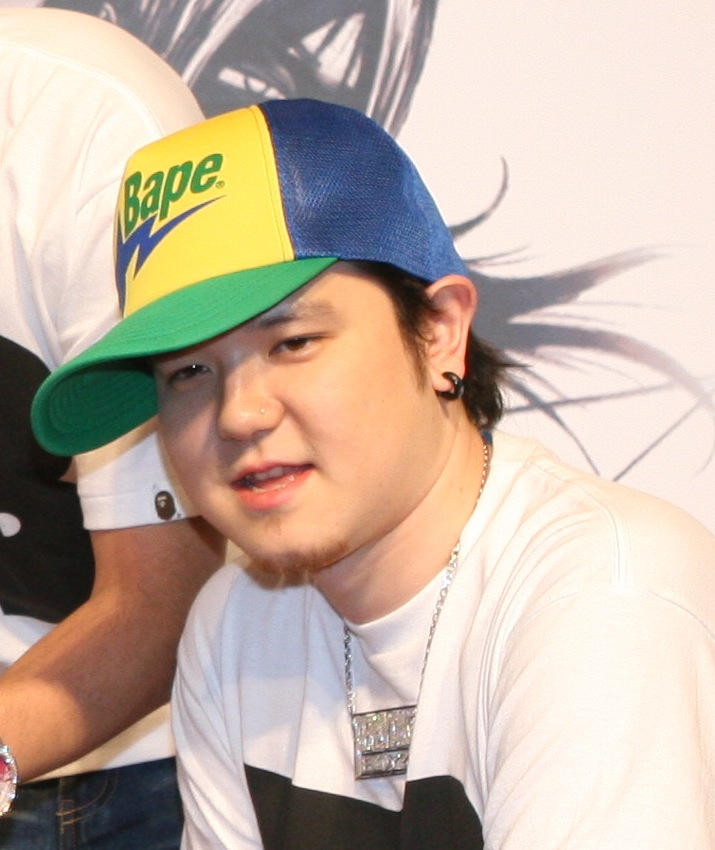
- Wise in 2006

Background information
- Also known as: WISE
- Born: August 10, 1979 (age 47)
- Origin: Japan
- Genre: Hip hop
- Occupations: Rapper; songwriter
- Years active: 1997–present
- Labels: Universal; (B)APE Sounds
- Member of: Wise'N'SonPub; Teriyaki Boyz
- Website: universal-music.co.jp/wise

Seiji Kameyama (亀山晴児, Kameyama Seiji; born on August 10, 1979), better known by his stage name Wise, is a rapper who raps in both English and Japanese. His mother is American and his father is Japanese and during high school, he lived in the United States. He is affiliated with the creative group Kazenohito. In 2005, he formed the duo Wise'N'SonPub with beatmaker SonPub, and the group Teriyaki Boyz with Nigo (founder of A Bathing Ape), Ryouji "Ryo-Z" Narita, Ilmari (from Rip Slyme) and Verbal (from M-Flo). He made his major debut as a solo artist with the single "Shine Like a Star" on February 21, 2007.

== Discography ==
=== Singles ===
- Alive
  1. "Alive"
  2. "My Way"
  3. "Wanna Know Ya"
  4. "Shine Like a Star" (Soul Source Production Mix)
- Shine Like a Star (February 21, 2007)
  1. "Shine Like a Star" (August 2007)
  2. "One Chance"
  3. "Shine Like a Star" (Instrumental)
  4. "One Chance" (Instrumental)
- Thinking of You (May 23, 2007)
  1. "Thinking of You"
  2. "Good Music" (feat. MC Leo)
- Mirror (July 23, 2008)
  1. "Mirror" feat. Salyu
- Furimukanaide feat. Hiromi (April 1, 2009)
  1. "Furimukanaide" feat. Hiromi
  2. "Unchain my Heart" feat. May J
  3. "Furimukanaide" feat. Hiromi (Instrumental)

=== Albums ===
- Children of the Sun (October 10, 2007)
  1. "Time to Rise"
  2. "Shine Like a Star"
  3. "Delicious"
  4. "Never at Once" feat. Himiko
  5. "Thinking of You"
  6. "Hey Girl!" Feat. Su (Rip Slyme)
  7. "Taiyou no Kodomo" feat. Afra. Cro-magnon
  8. "Good Music" feat. mc Leo
  9. "Play That Song"
  10. "Alive"
  11. "Hi no Tori" feat. Cro-magnon
- Love Quest (May 27, 2009)
  1. "Love Quest"
  2. "Aenakutemo" feat. Kana Nishino
  3. "Into the Sky" feat. Beat Crusaders
  4. "...In your Happiness"
  5. "Big City of Dreams" feat. Taro Soul
  6. "Furimukanaide" feat. Hiromi
  7. "Best Friend's Girl"
  8. "Mae e"
  9. "Free"
  10. "Can't Stop" feat. Speech (From Arrested Development)
  11. "Mirror" feat. Salyu
  12. "Unchain my Heart" feat. May J.
- Dakid (August 10, 2005) as Wise'N'SonPub
  1. "Welcome"
  2. "Memento"
  3. "Space Travelers"
  4. "Free Fall"
  5. "Drums Makes Romance"
  6. "Hi no Tori"
  7. "After the Rain..."
  8. "Simple Walk"
  9. "Zambot 3"
  10. "Nurture our Nature"
  11. "SK8 SKIT"
  12. "History"
  13. "Departure"

=== Other releases ===
- Mellow Yellow "Chikyū Walker"
  - 4 the Fabulous feat. YOUKID, Wise (Kaze no Hito) (June 29, 2005)
- Yoshika "Timeless" (January 18, 2006)
  - 13. Alive feat. Wise
- MAD Sequence* "M.A.D. Seq*" (March 22, 2006)
  - 10. It Makes Me Want to Say (Muddy Thumb pt.0) featuring Wise
- Def Tech "Catch the Wave" (April 26, 2006)
  - 9. Off the Edge feat. Wise
- Kaori Natori "Perfume" (May 24, 2006)
  - 13. I Believe Myself feat. Wise
- Masaharu Fukuyama "Fukuyama Masaharu Another Works remixed by Piston Nishizawa" (May 24, 2006)
  - 3. Sakura Zaka～featuring Wise
- Ya-kyim "Keep YA Style" (August 2, 2006)
  - 6. Styles feat. Simon, Norisiam-X, Wise & GS
- BoA "The Face" (February 27, 2008)
  - 3. My Way, Your Way feat. Wise
- Kana Nishino "Love One" (June 6, 2009)
  - 2. Tōkutemo feat. Wise

== See also ==
- Teriyaki Boyz
- M-Flo
- RIP SLYME
- A Bathing Ape
