= Pharrell Williams discography =

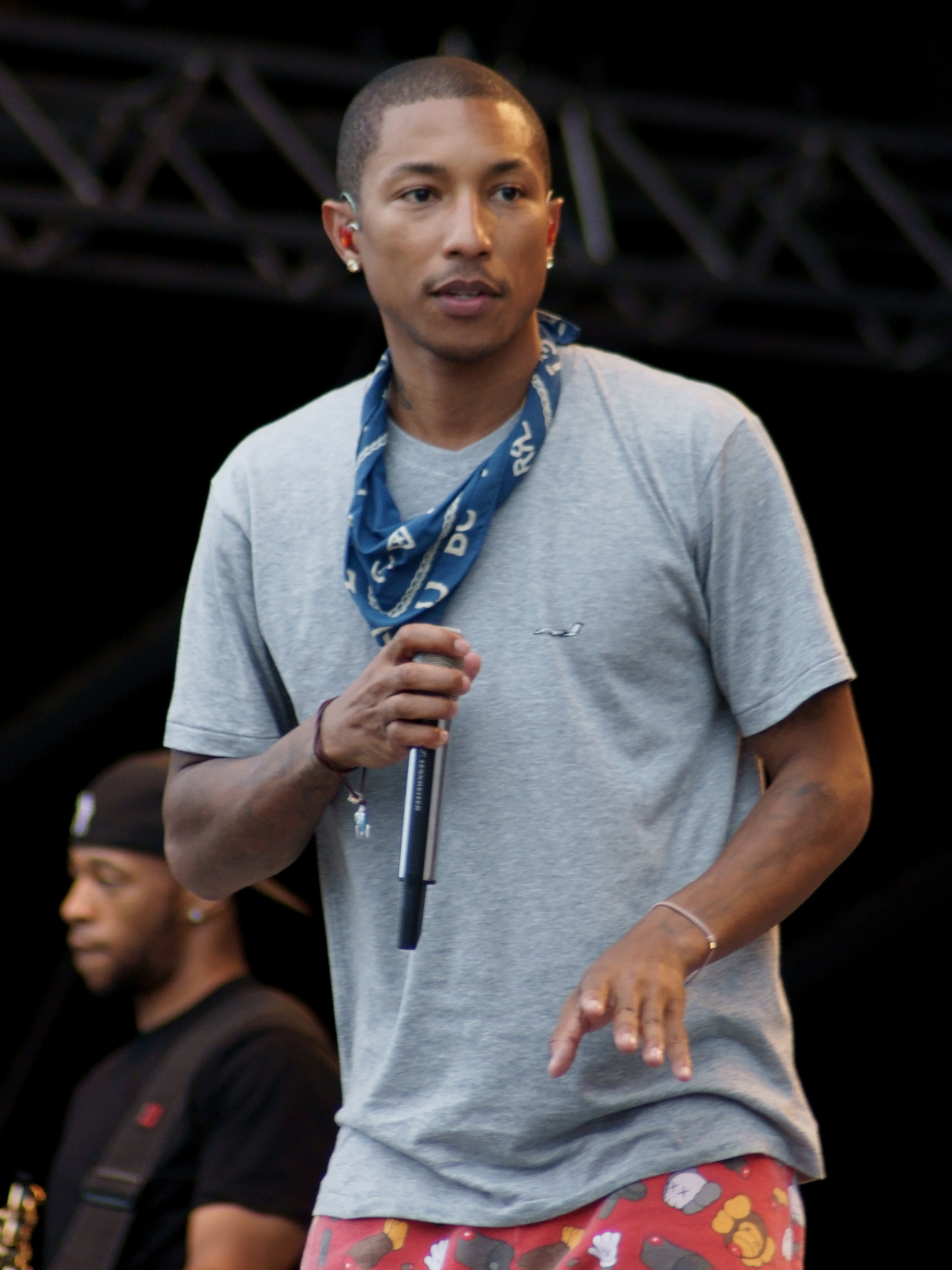
- Williams performing with N.E.R.D. at Pori Jazz 2010
- Studio albums: 2
- Extended plays: 2
- Mixtapes: 3
- Soundtrack albums: 2
- Singles: 80
- Video albums: 1
- Music videos: 62

The discography of American musician Pharrell Williams consists of two studio albums, two extended plays (EPs), three mixtapes, 30 singles (50 as a featured artist), one video album and 62 music videos.

On September 9, 2005, Williams performed the opening single from his first solo album In My Mind, "Can I Have It Like That"; featuring Gwen Stefani. The single did poorly in the US, reaching only number 48. It fared better in the UK, reaching number three. Between then and the July 25, 2006 release of "In My Mind", he released "Angel" (in Europe only), and later "Number One" (featuring Kanye West). "That Girl" (featuring Snoop Dogg) was the final single.

In 2013, Williams featured on Daft Punk's fourth studio album Random Access Memories on the songs "Get Lucky" and "Lose Yourself to Dance". In addition, Williams contributed to Azealia Banks' debut studio album Broke with Expensive Taste, featuring on the song "ATM Jam", though it was taken out of the album prior to release. Williams penned three new original songs, included alongside composer Heitor Pereira's score, for the sequel Despicable Me 2. These were "Just a Cloud Away", "Happy", and "Scream" (featuring CeeLo Green). His two original songs from the first film were also reprised on the soundtrack - "Despicable Me" and "Fun, Fun, Fun". In March 2013, Williams appeared alongside T.I. on Robin Thicke's hit single "Blurred Lines". The song has been a worldwide hit, has peaked at number one on the Billboard Hot 100, and has also reached number one in 13 more countries including the United Kingdom and Germany, making it Williams' third Billboard Hot 100 number one single. On June 29, 2013, he became the 12th artist in the chart's history to simultaneously hold the number one and two positions (with "Blurred Lines" and "Get Lucky", respectively). By July 2013, only 137 singles in UK chart history had achieved one million sales in the UK - that month Williams scored two million-sellers with "Get Lucky" and "Blurred Lines".

In November 2013, Williams released the first 24-hour music video to his Despicable Me 2 collaboration song, "Happy". Guest appearances included Magic Johnson, Steve Carell, Jimmy Kimmel, Jamie Foxx, Steve Martin, Odd Future, Miranda Cosgrove, Janelle Monáe, and many others. In December 2013, a press release from Columbia Records announced that Williams had signed a contract with the label and would be releasing an album in 2014, featuring the single "Happy" from the Despicable Me 2 soundtrack. "Happy" has since become one of the best-selling singles of all time, having sold more than 10 million copies worldwide. It is also the most downloaded song in the United Kingdom, with over 1.65 million copies sold. On March 4, 2014, Williams released his second studio album Girl, which includes the singles "Happy", "Marilyn Monroe", "Come Get It Bae" and "Gust of Wind".

On April 5, 2024, Williams quietly released the 10-song project Black Yacht Rock, Vol. 1: City of Limitless Access exclusively through BlackYachtRock.com.

== Albums ==
=== Studio albums ===
List of studio albums, with selected chart positions, sales figures and certifications
Title	Album details	Peak chart positions										Sales	Certifications
Title	Album details	US	AUS	CAN	DEN	GER	IRE	NL	NZ	SWI	UK	Sales	Certifications
In My Mind	Released: July 25, 2006; Label: Star Trak, Interscope; Formats: CD, LP, cassette, digital download	3	15	8	21	14	21	3	13	5	7	US: 406,000	BPI: Silver
Girl	Released: March 3, 2014; Label: I Am Other, Columbia; Formats: CD, LP, digital download	2	1	2	1	2	3	2	2	1	1	US: 591,000; UK: 300,000	RIAA: Gold; ARIA: Platinum; BPI: Platinum; IFPI SWI: Gold; NVPI: Gold; MC: Platinum

=== Mixtapes ===
Title	Mixtape details	Notes
In My Mind: The Prequel	Released: 2006; Format: Digital download	The mixtape was hosted by DJ Drama and features guest appearances by Clipse, T.I., Ab-Liva, and Fam-Lay.
The Billionaire Boys Club Tape	Released: October 29, 2010; Format: CD, Digital download	The mixtape features guest appearances by Lil Wayne, Jay-Z, Gucci Mane, Snoop Dogg and more.
Black Yacht Rock, Vol. 1: City of Limitless Access (as Virginia)	Released: April 5, 2024; Formats: Digital download	The 10-song mixtape was released exclusively on BlackYachtRock.com.

=== Soundtrack albums ===
- Hidden Figures (Original Score) (2017)
- Piece by Piece (Music from the Motion Picture) (2024)

== EPs ==
- Spotify Sessions (2014)

== Singles ==
=== As lead artist ===
List of singles as lead artist, with selected chart positions and certifications, showing year released and album name
Title	Year	Peak chart positions										Certifications	Album
Title	Year	US	AUS	CAN	FRA	GER	IRE	NL	NZ	SWI	UK	Certifications	Album
"Frontin'" (featuring Jay-Z)	2003	5	28	15	—	61	16	21	—	23	6	BPI: Gold; RMNZ: Platinum	Clones
"Show Me Your Soul" (with P. Diddy, Lenny Kravitz and Loon)	2003	—	45	—	—	61	—	—	—	62	35		Bad Boys II (soundtrack)
"Can I Have It Like That" (featuring Gwen Stefani)	2005	49	22	—	78	37	12	15	18	28	3		In My Mind
"Angel"	2006	—	44	—	—	62	20	35	—	—	15		In My Mind
"Number One" (featuring Kanye West)	2006	57	—	—	—	—	—	—	—	—	31		In My Mind
"That Girl" (featuring Snoop Dogg and Charlie Wilson)	2006	—	—	—	—	—	—	—	—	—	—		In My Mind
"My Drive Thru" (with Julian Casablancas and Santigold)	2008	—	—	—	—	—	—	—	—	—	—		Non-album single
"Happy"	2013	1	1	1	1	1	1	1	1	1	1	RIAA: 11× Platinum; ARIA: Diamond; BPI: 7× Platinum; BVMI: 9× Gold; IFPI DEN: 2× Platinum; IFPI SWI: Platinum; MC: 6× Platinum; RMNZ: 7× Platinum; SNEP: Diamond	Despicable Me 2 and Girl
"Marilyn Monroe"	2014	— (Note: "Marilyn Monroe" did not enter the Billboard Hot 100, but peaked at number 9 on the Bubbling Under Hot 100 Singles chart.)	29	—	27	25	35	18	—	46	25	ARIA: Gold; BVMI: Gold; IFPI DEN: Gold	Girl
"Come Get It Bae"	2014	23	61	25	108	—	92	84	30	—	87	RIAA: Gold; RMNZ: Gold	Girl
"Gust of Wind"	2014	—	—	—	32	—	—	—	—	—	79		Girl
"It Girl"	2014	—	—	—	60	—	—	—	—	—	191		Girl
"Freedom"	2015	—	41	—	13	66	—	27	—	26	36	BPI: Silver; RMNZ: Gold	Despicable Me 3 (soundtrack)
"Crave"	2016	—	—	—	—	—	—	—	—	—	—		Hidden Figures: The Album
"Able"	2016	—	—	—	—	—	—	—	—	—	—		Hidden Figures: The Album
"Sangria Wine" (with Camila Cabello)	2018	83	—	88	—	—	76	—	— (Note: "Sangria Wine" did not enter the NZ Top 40 Singles Chart, but peaked at number seven on the NZ Heatseeker Singles Chart.)	92	84		Non-album single
"The Mantra" (with Kendrick Lamar and Mike Will Made It)	2018	—	—	—	—	—	—	—	—	—	—		Creed II: The Album
"E-Lo" (with Los Unidades featuring Jozzy)	2018	—	—	—	—	—	—	—	— (Note: "E-Lo" did not enter the NZ Top 40 Singles Chart, but peaked at number 38 on the NZ Hot Singles Chart.)	—	—		Global Citizen EP 1
"Blast Off" (with Gesaffelstein)	2019	—	—	—	—	—	—	—	—	—	—		Hyperion
"Entrepreneur" (featuring Jay-Z)	2020	—	—	—	—	—	—	—	—	—	—		Non-album single
"Just a Cloud Away"	2022	— (Note: "Just a Cloud Away" did not enter the Billboard Hot 100, but peaked at number 3 on the Bubbling Under Hot 100 Singles chart.)	—	85	—	—	47	90	27	—	99	BPI: Silver; RMNZ: Gold	Despicable Me 2 (soundtrack)
"Cash In Cash Out" (featuring 21 Savage and Tyler, the Creator)	2022	26	62	33	—	—	—	— (Note: "Cash In Cash Out" did not enter the single top 100, but reached number 30 on its extension, the Single Tip.)	— (Note: "Cash In Cash Out" did not enter the NZ Top 40 singles chart, but peaked at number four on the NZ hot singles chart.)	—	73	RIAA: Gold	Non-album single
"Stay with Me" (with Calvin Harris, Justin Timberlake, and Halsey)	2022	— (Note: "Stay with Me" did not enter the Billboard Hot 100, but peaked at number two on the Bubbling Under Hot 100 Singles chart.)	78	51	—	—	15	35	— (Note: "Stay with Me" did not enter the NZ Top 40 Singles Chart, but peaked at number two on the NZ Hot Singles Chart.)	—	10	ARIA: Gold; BPI: Silver	Funk Wav Bounces Vol. 2
"Down in Atlanta" (with Travis Scott)	2022	88	68	56	—	82	61	79	— (Note: "Down in Atlanta" did not enter the NZ Top 40 Singles Chart, but peaked at number one on the NZ Hot Singles Chart.)	25	81		Non-album singles
"Joy (Unstoppable)" (with Voices of Fire)	2023	—	—	—	—	—	—	—	—	—	—		Non-album singles
"Airplane Tickets" (with Swae Lee and Rauw Alejandro)	2023	—	—	—	—	—	—	—	— (Note: "Airplane Tickets" did not enter the NZ Top 40 Singles Chart, but peaked at number 40 on the NZ Hot Singles Chart.)	—	—		Non-album singles
"Good People" (with Mumford & Sons)	2024	—	—	—	—	—	—	—	— (Note: "Good People" did not enter the NZ Top 40 Singles Chart, but peaked at number 35 on the NZ Hot Singles Chart.)	—	—		Non-album singles
"Doctor (Work It Out)" (with Miley Cyrus)	2024	74	— (Note: "Doctor (Work It Out)" did not enter the top 50 of the ARIA Singles Chart, but peaked at number 20 on the ARIA New Music Singles Chart.)	41	—	44	—	—	— (Note: "Doctor (Work It Out)" did not enter the NZ Top 40 Singles Chart, but peaked at number five on the NZ Hot Singles Chart.)	—	46		Non-album singles
"Double Life"	2024	89	—	68	—	—	52	—	— (Note: "Double Life" did not enter the NZ Top 40 Singles Chart, but peaked at number 27 on the NZ Hot Singles Chart.)	—	56		Despicable Me 4 (soundtrack)
"Not in the Store" (with Doodles and Coi Leray)	2024	—	—	—	—	—	—	—	—	—	—		Non-album single
"—" denotes items which were not released in that country or failed to chart.

=== As featured artist ===
List of singles as featured artist, with selected chart positions and certifications, showing year released and album name
Title	Year	Peak chart positions										Certifications	Album
Title	Year	US	AUS	CAN	FRA	GER	IRE	NL	NZ	SWI	UK	Certifications	Album
"Shake Ya Ass" (Mystikal featuring Pharrell Williams; uncredited)	2000	13	62	—	—	87	—	—	—	—	30		Let's Get Ready
"I Just Wanna Love U (Give It 2 Me)" (Jay-Z featuring Pharrell Williams; uncredited)	2000	11	—	—	—	75	—	—	—	86	17		The Dynasty: Roc La Familia
"Formal Invite" (Ray J featuring Pharrell)	2002	—	—	—	—	—	—	—	—	—	—		This Ain't a Game
"Pass the Courvoisier, Part II" (Busta Rhymes featuring P. Diddy and Pharrell)	2002	11	43	—	—	27	34	—	—	58	16		Genesis
"Boys" (Britney Spears featuring Pharrell Williams)	2002	— (Note: "Boys" did not enter the Billboard Hot 100, but peaked at number 22 on the Bubbling Under Hot 100 Singles chart.)	14	—	55	19	10	13	39	20	7	ARIA: Gold	Britney and Austin Powers in Goldmember: Music from the Motion Picture
"When the Last Time" (Clipse featuring Kelis and Pharrell Williams; uncredited)	2002	19	—	—	—	—	—	—	—	—	41		Lord Willin'
"From tha Chuuuch to da Palace" (Snoop Dogg featuring Pharrell)	2002	77	—	—	—	75	—	97	—	—	27		Paid tha Cost to Be da Boss
"Beautiful" (Snoop Dogg featuring Pharrell and Uncle Charlie Wilson)	2003	6	4	—	39	27	41	13	4	19	23	ARIA: Gold; BPI: Gold; RMNZ: 2× Platinum	Paid tha Cost to Be da Boss
"Excuse Me Miss" (Jay-Z featuring Pharrell)	2003	8	38	—	—	67	—	—	—	76	17	RIAA: Gold	The Blueprint 2: The Gift & The Curse
"Belly Dancer" (Kardinal Offishall featuring Pharrell)	2003	—	—	—	—	—	—	—	—	—	—		Non-album single
"Light Your Ass on Fire" (Busta Rhymes featuring Pharrell)	2003	58	59	—	—	86	—	—	—	40	62		Clones
"Change Clothes" (Jay-Z featuring Pharrell)	2003	10	44	—	—	54	48	—	42	44	32		The Black Album
"Drop It Like It's Hot" (Snoop Dogg featuring Pharrell)	2004	1	4	—	21	8	7	7	1	3	10	RIAA: Gold; ARIA: Gold; BPI: Gold; BVMI: Gold; RMNZ: 3× Platinum	R&G (Rhythm & Gangsta): The Masterpiece
"Let's Get Blown" (Snoop Dogg featuring Pharrell)	2004	54	—	—	—	—	16	35	19	22	13		R&G (Rhythm & Gangsta): The Masterpiece
"Wanna Love You Girl" (Robin Thicke featuring Pharrell)	2005	—	—	—	—	—	—	—	—	—	—		The Evolution of Robin Thicke
"Mr. Me Too" (Clipse featuring Pharrell)	2006	—	—	—	—	—	—	—	—	—	—		Hell Hath No Fury
"Margarita" (Sleepy Brown featuring Big Boi and Pharrell)	2006	— (Note: "Margarita" did not enter the Billboard Hot 100, but peaked at number 8 on the Bubbling Under Hot 100 Singles chart.)	—	—	—	—	—	—	—	—	—		Mr. Brown
"Money Maker" (Ludacris featuring Pharrell)	2006	1	—	—	—	86	—	—	—	—	—	RIAA: 2× Platinum	Release Therapy
"Sex 'n' Money" (Paul Oakenfold featuring Pharrell)	2006	—	—	—	—	—	—	—	—	—	—		A Lively Mind
"Give It Up" (Twista featuring Pharrell)	2007	—	—	—	—	—	—	—	—	—	—		Adrenaline Rush 2007
"Blue Magic" (Jay-Z featuring Pharrell)	2007	55	—	—	—	—	—	—	—	—	—		American Gangster
"I Know" (Jay-Z featuring Pharrell)	2008	— (Note: "I Know" did not enter the Billboard Hot 100, but peaked at number 18 on the Bubbling Under Hot 100 Singles chart.)	—	—	—	—	—	—	—	—	—		American Gangster
"Zock On!" (Teriyaki Boyz featuring Busta Rhymes and Pharrell)	2008	—	—	—	—	—	—	—	—	—	—		Serious Japanese
"Universal Mind Control" (Common featuring Pharrell)	2008	62	—	—	—	—	—	—	—	—	—		Universal Mind Control
"Announcement" (Common featuring Pharrell)	2008	—	—	—	—	—	—	—	—	—	—		Universal Mind Control
"Work That!" (Teriyaki Boyz featuring Pharrell and Chris Brown)	2009	—	—	—	—	—	—	—	—	—	—		Serious Japanese
"Blanco" (Pitbull featuring Pharrell)	2009	—	—	—	—	—	—	—	—	—	—		Fast and Furious (soundtrack)
"I'm Good" (Clipse featuring Pharrell)	2009	—	—	—	—	—	—	—	—	—	—		Til the Casket Drops
"Popular Demand (Popeyes)" (Clipse featuring Cam'ron and Pharrell)	2009	—	—	—	—	—	—	—	—	—	—		Til the Casket Drops
"ADD SUV" (Uffie featuring Pharrell)	2010	—	—	—	—	—	—	—	—	—	—		Sex Dreams and Denim Jeans
"One (Your Name)" (Swedish House Mafia featuring Pharrell)	2010	—	—	88	16	41	7	1	—	13	7	ARIA: Platinum; BEL: Platinum; BPI: Platinum; DEN: Gold; SWE: 2× Platinum	Until One & Until Now
"Here Ye, Hear Ye" (T.I. featuring Pharrell)	2011	—	—	—	—	—	—	—	—	—	—		Non-album single
"Celebrate" (Mika featuring Pharrell Williams)	2012	—	—	—	33	—	—	75	—	—	—	FIMI: Gold	The Origin of Love
"Blurred Lines" (Robin Thicke featuring T.I. and Pharrell)	2013	1	1	1	1	1	1	1	1	1	1	RIAA: Diamond; ARIA: 9× Platinum; BPI: 4× Platinum; BVMI: 4× Platinum; IFPI SWI: Platinum; MC: 9× Platinum; RMNZ: 6× Platinum; SNEP: Diamond	Blurred Lines
"Get Lucky" (Daft Punk featuring Pharrell Williams)	2013	2	1	2	1	1	1	2	2	1	1	RIAA: 8× Platinum; ARIA: 6× Platinum; BPI: 3× Platinum; BVMI: 3× Gold; IFPI SWI: Platinum; RMNZ: 5× Platinum; SNEP: Diamond	Random Access Memories
"Feds Watching" (2 Chainz featuring Pharrell)	2013	66	—	—	—	51	—	—	—	—	—	RIAA: Gold	B.O.A.T.S. II: Me Time
"Get Like Me" (Nelly featuring Nicki Minaj and Pharrell)	2013	— (Note: "Get Like Me" did not enter the Billboard Hot 100, but peaked at number 8 on the Bubbling Under Hot 100 Singles chart.)	—	—	—	—	96	—	—	—	19		M.O.
"Lose Yourself to Dance" (Daft Punk featuring Pharrell Williams)	2013	— (Note: "Lose Yourself to Dance" did not enter the Billboard Hot 100, but peaked at number 3 on the Bubbling Under Hot 100 Singles chart.)	—	—	31	—	62	—	—	59	49	RIAA: Platinum; BPI: Silver; RMNZ: Gold	Random Access Memories
"ATM Jam" (Azealia Banks featuring Pharrell)	2013	—	—	—	—	—	—	—	—	—	169		Non-album single
"Move That Dope" (Future featuring Pharrell, Pusha T and Casino)	2014	46	—	—	—	—	—	—	—	—	—	RIAA: Platinum	Honest
"Aerosol Can" (Major Lazer featuring Pharrell Williams)	2014	—	37	—	—	—	—	—	—	—	—		Apocalypse Soon
"Finna Get Loose" (Puff Daddy featuring Pharrell)	2015	—	—	—	—	—	—	—	—	—	—		No Way Out II
"WTF (Where They From)" (Missy Elliott featuring Pharrell Williams)	2015	22	45	21	—	82	—	—	—	—	66	RIAA: Platinum	Block Party
"Dream Bigger" (Axwell Λ Ingrosso featuring Pharrell)	2016	—	—	—	—	—	—	—	—	—	—		More Than You Know
"Safari" (J Balvin featuring Pharrell Williams, BIA and Sky)	2016	— (Note: "Safari" did not enter the Billboard Hot 100, but peaked at number 7 on the Billboard Bubbling Under Hot 100 Singles chart.)	—	—	132	—	—	—	—	76	—		Energía
"Surfin'" (Kid Cudi featuring Pharrell)	2016	—	77	—	—	—	—	—	—	—	—		Passion, Pain & Demon Slayin'
"Go Up" (Cassius featuring Cat Powers & Pharrell Williams)	2017	—	—	—	—	—	—	—	—	—	—		Ibifornia
"Heatstroke" (Calvin Harris featuring Young Thug, Pharrell Williams and Ariana Grande)	2017	96	23	53	—	85	—	—	— (Note: "Heatstroke" did not enter the NZ Top 40 Singles Chart, but peaked at number one on the NZ Heatseekers Singles Chart.)	40	25	RIAA: Gold; ARIA: Gold; BPI: Silver; RMNZ: Platinum	Funk Wav Bounces Vol. 1
"Feels" (Calvin Harris featuring Pharrell Williams, Katy Perry and Big Sean)	2017	20	3	5	6	9	3	62	2	6	1	RIAA: 2× Platinum; ARIA: 6× Platinum; BPI: 2× Platinum; BVMI: Platinum; RMNZ: 4× Platinum; SNEP: Platinum	Funk Wav Bounces Vol. 1
"Uno Mas" (N.O.R.E. featuring Pharrell Williams)	2018	—	—	—	—	—	—	—	—	—	—		5E
"Midsection" (Kaytranada featuring Pharrell Williams)	2019	—	—	—	—	—	—	—	—	—	—		Bubba
"10 Missed Calls" (Black Coffee featuring Pharrell Williams and Jozzy)	2020	—	—	—	—	—	—	—	—	—	—		Subconsciously
"Dat Right There" (Summer Walker featuring Pharrell Williams)	2020	—	—	—	—	—	—	—	—	—	—		Still Over It
"Juggernaut" (Tyler, the Creator featuring Lil Uzi Vert and Pharrell Williams)	2021	40	49	30	—	—	—	—	36	—	—	RIAA: Gold	Call Me If You Get Lost
"Hide" (Cassie featuring Pharrell Williams)	2021	—	—	—	—	—	—	—	—	—	—		Non-album single
"Neck & Wrist" (Pusha T featuring Jay-Z and Pharrell Williams)	2022	76	—	69	—	—	—	—	—	—	—		It's Almost Dry
"At the Party" (Kid Cudi featuring Pharrell Williams and Travis Scott)	2023	—	47	—	—	—	—	—	— (Note: "At the Party" did not enter the NZ Top 40 Singles Chart, but peaked at number 16 on the NZ Hot Singles Chart.)	—	—		Insano
"Can't Hold Me Down" (Lil Wayne, Lil Yachty, and Doodles featuring Pharrell Williams and Kyle Richh)	2024	—	—	—	—	—	—	—	—	—	—		Non-album singles
"Doodleverse" (Doodles, Lil Yachty, and Swae Lee featuring Pharrell Williams)	2024	—	—	—	—	—	—	—	—	—	—		Non-album singles
"LV Bag" (Don Toliver, Speedy, and J-Hope featuring Pharrell Williams)	2025	83	—	95	—	—	—	—	— (Note: "LV Bag" did not enter the NZ Top 40 Singles Chart, but peaked at number eight on the NZ Hot Singles Chart.)	—	93		Non-album singles
"—" denotes a single that did not chart or was not released in that territory.

== Other charted and certified songs ==
List of songs, with selected chart positions, showing year released and album name
Title	Year	Peak chart positions						Certifications	Album
Title	Year	US	AUS	CAN	FRA	ICE	UK	Certifications	Album
"IFHY" (Tyler, the Creator featuring Pharrell Williams)	2013	—	—	—	—	—	—	RIAA: Platinum; RMNZ: Gold	Wolf
"Brand New" (with Justin Timberlake)	2014	124	—	—	63	13	104		Girl
"Hunter"	2014	—	—	—	51	—	—		Girl
"Gush"	2014	—	—	—	113	—	—		Girl
"Lost Queen"	2014	—	—	—	198	—	—		Girl
"Know Who You Are" (with Alicia Keys)	2014	—	—	—	76	—	—		Girl
"Neon Guts" (Lil Uzi Vert featuring Pharrell Williams)	2017	79	—	—	—	—	—	RIAA: 2× Platinum; RMNZ: Gold	Luv Is Rage 2
"Skeletons" (Travis Scott featuring Pharrell Williams, Tame Impala, and the Weeknd)	2018	47	—	42	110	—	—	RIAA: 2× Platinum; MC: 2× Platinum; BPI: Silver	Astroworld
"Juggernaut" (Tyler, the Creator featuring Lil Uzi Vert and Pharrell Williams)	2021	40	49	30	—	—	—	RIAA: Gold	Call Me If You Get Lost
"Spoiled" (Pop Smoke featuring Pharrell Williams)	2021	—	—	99	—	—	—		Faith
"Dat Right There" (Summer Walker featuring Pharrell Williams)	2021	77	—	—	—	—	—	RIAA: Gold	Still Over It
"Movie Stars" (Jack Harlow featuring Pharrell Williams)	2022	— (Note: "Movie Stars" did not enter the Billboard Hot 100, but peaked at number one on the Bubbling Under Hot 100 Singles chart.)	89	63	—	—	—		Come Home the Kids Miss You
"—" denotes a song that did not chart in that territory.

== Guest appearances ==
List of non-single guest appearances with other performing artists, showing year released and album name
Title	Year	Other artist(s)	Album
"Blow My Whistle"	2001	Foxy Brown, Hikaru Utada, Chad Hugo	Def Jam's Rush Hour 2 Soundtrack
"What's Yo Name"	2001	T.I.	I'm Serious
"Blind Situation" (credited as "D.R.U.G.S.")	2001	Shea Seger	The May Street Project
"Mr. Baller"	2002	Royce da 5'9", Clipse, Tré Little	Rock City
"Crew Deep" (The V.A. Remix)	2002	Skillz, Clipse, Missy "Misdemeanor" Elliott	"Crew Deep" single
"The Art of Noise"	2004	Cee Lo Green	Cee-Lo Green... Is the Soul Machine
"Let's Stay Together"	2004	Cee Lo Green	Cee-Lo Green... Is the Soul Machine
"Hot Sauce to Go"	2004	Jadakiss	Kiss of Death
"Play It Off"	2004	Nelly	Suit
"Class System"	2004	Handsome Boy Modeling School, Julee Cruise	White People
"When I Get You Home (A.I.O.U.)"	2004	Twista, Jamie Foxx	The Day After
"Goin' Out"	2005	Faith Evans, Pusha T	The First Lady
"Already Platinum"	2005	Slim Thug	Already Platinum
"Goodlife"	2006	T.I., Common	King
"Gettin' Some Head"	2006	Lil Wayne	Dedication 2
"Gettin' Some" (Remix)	2006	Shawnna, Ludacris, Lil Wayne, Too Short	Block Music
"Vente Mami"	2006	N.O.R.E., Zion	N.O.R.E. y la Familia...Ya Tú Sabe
"Anything"	2006	Jay-Z, Usher	Kingdom Come
"Yummy"	2006	Gwen Stefani	The Sweet Escape
"Cheers"	2007	DJ Drama, Clipse	Gangsta Grillz: The Album
"Sets Up"	2008	Snoop Dogg	Ego Trippin'
"Patron"	2008	Sean Garrett	Turbo 919
"Let It Go (Lil Mama)"	2008	Nelly	Brass Knuckles
"Gladiator"	2008	Common	Universal Mind Control
"Ay Man"	2009	Lil Wayne	none
"Stress Ya"	2009	Jadakiss	The Last Kiss
"Kill Dem"	2009	Busta Rhymes, Tosh	Back on My B.S.
"So Ambitious"	2009	Jay-Z	The Blueprint 3
"Let It Loose"	2009	Wale	Attention Deficit
"Special"	2009	Snoop Dogg, Brandy	Malice n Wonderland
"Fun, Fun, Fun"	2010	none	Despicable Me soundtrack
"Minion Mambo"	2010	The Minions, Lupe Fiasco	Despicable Me soundtrack
"Prettiest Girls"	2010	none	Despicable Me soundtrack
"Rocket's Theme"	2010	none	Despicable Me soundtrack
"Haterade"	2010	Gucci Mane, Nicki Minaj	The Appeal: Georgia's Most Wanted
"Amazing"	2010	T.I.	No Mercy
"In My '64"	2011	Game, Snoop Dogg	Purp & Patron
"Dedicated"	2011	Game	Purp & Patron
"It Must Be Me"	2011	Game	none
"Bang Bang"	2011	Swizz Beatz, Pusha T	Monster Mondays Vol. 1
"If You Want To"	2011	Travis Barker, Lupe Fiasco	Give the Drummer Some
"Real"	2011	The-Dream	1977
"Raid"	2011	Pusha T, 50 Cent	Fear of God II: Let Us Pray
"MMG the World Is Ours"	2012	Rick Ross, Meek Mill, Stalley	Rich Forever
"Lil' Homie"	2012	Tyga	Careless World: Rise of the Last King
"When My Niggas Come Home"	2012	Game, Snoop Dogg	California Republic
"It Must Be Tough"	2012	Game, Mysonne	California Republic
"They Don't Want None"	2012	Game, Shyne	California Republic
"Roll My Shit"	2012	Game, Snoop Dogg	California Republic
"Chasin' Paper"	2012	Currensy	The Stoned Immaculate
"Twisted"	2012	Usher	Looking 4 Myself
"Lift Off"	2012	Conor Maynard	Contrast
"As Far As They Know"	2012	Buddy	Idle Time
"Errybody"	2012	Masia One, Game, Isis	none
"Presidential" (Remix)	2012	Rick Ross, Rockie Fresh	The Black Bar Mitzvah
"Rise Above"	2012	Wiz Khalifa, Tuki Carter, Amber Rose	O.N.I.F.C.
"Pretty Flacko" (Remix)	2013	ASAP Rocky, Gucci Mane, Waka Flocka Flame	Long. Live. ASAP
"IFHY"	2013	Tyler, The Creator	Wolf
"The Problem (Lawwwddd)"	2013	N.O.R.E.	Student of the Game
"IDGAF"	2013	Mike Posner	none
"Hugs"	2013	The Lonely Island	The Wack Album
"Feet to the Fire"	2013	Kelly Rowland	Talk a Good Game
"Wanderlust"	2013	The Weeknd	Kiss Land
"IDGAF"	2013	Nelly, T.I.	M.O.
"S.N.I.T.C.H."	2013	Pusha T	My Name Is My Name
"See That Boy Again"	2014	Mary J. Blige	Think Like a Man Too (soundtrack)
"Oh Yeah"	2014	T.I.	Paperwork
"Paperwork"	2014	T.I.	Paperwork
"Light 'Em Up (RIP Doe B)"	2014	T.I., Watch the Duck	Paperwork
"Keep Da O's"	2015	Tyler, The Creator	Cherry Bomb
"Tease"	2015	Jamie Foxx	Hollywood: A Story of a Dozen Roses
"Last Kiss"	2015	Overdoz.	2008
"Stretch 2-3-4"	2015	Watch the Duck	The Trojan Horse
"What a Year"	2015	Big Sean	none
"Hear Me"	2016	A$AP Rocky	none
"123 Victory (Remix)"	2016	Kirk Franklin	Non-album single
"Numbers"	2016	Skepta	Konnichiwa
"Flight at First Sight / Advanced"	2016	Kid Cudi	Passion, Pain & Demon Slayin'
"The Turn Down"	2017	Thundercat	Drunk
"Aries (Yugo)"	2017	Mike Will Made It	Ransom 2
"Icha Gicha"	2017	Kap G	Supa Jefe
"Bring Dem Things"	2017	French Montana	Jungle Rules
"Wings"	2017	Vic Mensa	The Autobiography
"Enjoy Right Now, Today"	2017	Tyler, The Creator	Flower Boy
"Bailan"	2017	2 Chainz	Pretty Girls Like Trap Music
"Neon Guts"	2017	Lil Uzi Vert	Luv Is Rage 2
"Stare"	2017	Ty Dolla $ign, Wiz Khalifa	Beach House 3
"I Got the Juice"	2018	Janelle Monáe	Dirty Computer
"Chanel"	2018	Rae Sremmurd, Swae Lee	SR3MM
"Skeletons"	2018	Travis Scott, Tame Impala, the Weeknd	Astroworld
"Blazed"	2018	Ariana Grande	Sweetener
"Saw Lightning"	2019	Beck	Hyperspace
"Are We Still Friends?"	2019	Tyler, the Creator	Igor
"Frontal Lobe Muzik"	2019	Daniel Caesar	Case Study 01
"Woah (Remix)"	2020	Snoh Aalegra	Non-album single
"Cherry Pie"	2020	Buju Banton	Upside Down 2020
"JU$T"	2020	Run the Jewels, Zack De La Rocha	RTJ4
"Certified Neptunes"	2021	Moneybagg Yo	A Gangsta's Pain
"Spoiled"	2021	Pop Smoke	Faith
"Movie Star"	2022	Jack Harlow	Come Home the Kids Miss You
"Functional Addict"	2022	Nigo, Gunna	I Know Nigo!
"Paper Plates"	2022	Nigo, A$AP Ferg	I Know Nigo!
"Falling Up"	2023	Adekunle Gold, Nile Rodgers	Tequila Ever After
"Rich MF"	2023	Yella Beezy	Non-album single
"Good Mornin'"	2024	Marley Bleu	Non-album single
"Committed"	2024	Rauw Alejandro	Cosa Nuestra
"U Gotta"	2024	Earthgang	Perfect Fantasy
"Spot"	2025	Snoop Dogg, Tonio Armani	Iz It a Crime?
"Horoscope"	2025	Jon Bellion	Father Figure
"Big Poe"	2025	Tyler, The Creator	Don't Tap The Glass
"Baby Breath"	2026	Quavo; ASAP Rocky; Tyler, the Creator	Qrömelife

== Videography ==
=== Video albums ===
- Apple Music Festival: London 2015 (2015)

=== Music videos ===
Year	Title	Album
2003	"Frontin'" (with Jay-Z)	Clones
2005	"Can I Have It Like That" (with Gwen Stefani)	In My Mind
2005	"Angel"	In My Mind
2006	"Number One" (with Kanye West)	In My Mind
2006	"That Girl" (with Snoop Dogg and Charlie Wilson)	In My Mind
2013	"Happy" (2 versions)	Despicable Me 2 soundtrack/Girl
2013	"Come Get It Bae" (with Miley Cyrus)	Girl
2014	"Marilyn Monroe"	Girl
2014	"Gust of Wind"	Girl
2014	"It Girl"	Girl
2015	"Freedom"	Despicable Me 3 soundtrack
2017	"Yellow Light"	Despicable Me 3 soundtrack
2020	"Entrepeneur" (with Jay-Z)	non-album
2022	"Cash In Cash Out" (with 21 Savage and Tyler, the Creator)	non-album
2022	"Down in Atlanta" (lyric video) (with Travis Scott)	non-album
2023	"Airplane Tickets" (with Swae Lee and Rauw Alejandro)	non-album
2024	"Doctor (Work It Out)" (with Miley Cyrus)	non-album
2024	"Double Life" (lyric video)	Despicable Me 4 soundtrack
2024	"Piece by Piece"	Piece by Piece soundtrack

=== Collaborations in music videos ===
ear	Title	Other Performer	Album
2000	"Shake Ya Ass"	Mystikal	Let's Get Ready
2002	"Pass the Courvoisier, Part II"	Busta Rhymes and Sean Combs	Genesis
2002	"Boys"	Britney Spears	Britney/Austin Powers in Goldmember soundtrack
2002	"When the Last Time"	Clipse and Kelis	Lord Willin'
2002	"From tha Chuuuch to da Palace"	Snoop Dogg	Paid tha Cost to Be da Boss
2002	"Beautiful"	Snoop Dogg and Charlie Wilson	Paid tha Cost to Be da Boss
2003	"Excuse Me Miss"	Jay-Z	The Blueprint 2: The Gift & The Curse
2003	"Light Your Ass on Fire"	Busta Rhymes	Clones
2003	"Change Clothes"	Jay-Z	The Black Album
2004	"Drop It Like It's Hot"	Snoop Dogg	R&G (Rhythm & Gangsta): The Masterpiece
2004	"Let's Get Blown"	Snoop Dogg	R&G (Rhythm & Gangsta): The Masterpiece
2005	"Wanna Love You Girl"	Robin Thicke	The Evolution of Robin Thicke
2006	"Mr. Me Too"	Clipse	Hell Hath No Fury
2006	"Wanna Love You Girl" (Remix)	Robin Thicke and Busta Rhymes	non-album
2006	"Margarita"	Sleepy Brown and Big Boi	Mr. Brown
2006	"Money Maker"	Ludacris	Release Therapy
2006	"Sex 'n' Money"	Paul Oakenfold	A Lively Mind
2007	"Give It Up"	Twista	Adrenaline Rush 2007
2007	"Blue Magic"	Jay-Z	American Gangster
2008	"I Know"	Jay-Z	American Gangster
2008	"Universal Mind Control" (2 versions)	Common	Universal Mind Control
2008	"Let It Go (Lil Mama)"	Nelly	Brass Knuckles
2009	"Blanco"	Pitbull	Fast & Furious soundtrack
2009	"I'm Good"	Clipse	Til the Casket Drops
2010	"ADD SUV"	Uffie	Sex Dreams and Denim Jeans
2010	"One (Your Name)"	Swedish House Media	Until One/Until Now
2010	"Ain't No Doubt About It"	The Game and Justin Timberlake	non-album
2012	"Celebrate"	Mika	The Origin of Love
2013	"Blurred Lines"	Robin Thicke and T.I.	Blurred Lines
2013	"Feds Watching"	2 Chainz	B.O.A.T.S. II: Me Time
2013	"Get Like Me"	Nelly and Nicki Minaj	M.O.
2013	"Lose Yourself to Dance"	Daft Punk and Nile Rodgers	Random Access Memories
2013	"Liar Liar"	Cris Cab	Where I Belong
2014	"Move That Dope"	Future, Pusha T and Casino	Honest
2014	"Hugs"	The Lonely Island and Tatiana Maslany	The Wack Album
2015	"California Roll"	Snoop Dogg and Stevie Wonder	Bush
2015	"Finna Get Loose"	Puff Daddy	No Way Out II
2015	"WTF (Where They From)"	Missy Elliott	Block Party
2016	"Safari"	J Balvin, BIA and nSky	Energía
2017	"Feels" (2 versions)	Calvin Harris, Katy Perry and Big Sean	Funk Wav Bounces Vol. 1
2018	"Aries (Yugo)"	Mike Will Made It, Quavo, Big Sean and Rae Sremmurd	Ransom 2

== See also ==
- Pharrell Williams production discography
- N.E.R.D. discography
- Child Rebel Soldier discography
- The Neptunes production discography
