= Back to the Basics (EP) =

EP by Twista
- Released: December 10, 2013
- Recorded: 2013
- Genre: Hip hop
- Length: 23:11
- Label: GMG
- Producer: The Legendary Traxster; DJ Tight Mike; Lo-Key

Twista chronology
The Perfect Storm (2010)	Back to the Basics (2013)	Dark Horse (2014)

Back to the Basics is the second extended play (EP) by American hip hop recording artist Twista, released on December 10, 2013 under his record label, GMG Entertainment. The project is the Chicago emcee's second EP of his career – the first one is 2 for 10 (2005) – and follows his eighth studio album, The Perfect Storm (2010). It served as a lead up to his ninth album, Dark Horse (2014). The seven-track EP features production from The Legendary Traxster, DJ Tight Mike and Lo-Key, and two guest appearances, from Dra Day and DJ Victoriouz. The EP was preceded by two music videos – "Intro/Freestyle," and "Beast."

== Background ==
In an interview with The Real Hip-Hop in December 2013, Twista explained that the title his EP "pertains" to him "more than the industry". "Sometimes I'll lose sense of self trying to try so many things. I'm so creative that I'll try different things that's out the box and when I feel like I'm going too far out the box I bring it back in. Right at that time when I was bringing it back in I said I wanted to title my new EP Back to the Basics [because] that's what [I'm going to] get to as far as the Twista sound and doing what I do that I know people like."

The Chicago emcee selected a few songs that he felt was "a good warm-up for people to get reacquainted with Twista" before releasing his upcoming full-length album, titled The Dark Horse, in 2014.

== Critical reception ==
Professional ratings
Review scores
Source	Rating
XXL	(L)

Upon its release, Back to the Basics received generally mixed reviews from music critics. M.T. Richards of XXL gave the album an L, saying "There’s a certainly a shortage of radio fodder on Back to the Basics: the hooks are modest, the beats conservative. Technique is Twista’s weapon of choice and foremost priority. We listen to the Rust Belt legend for stuttery but graceful thickets of rhyme, verses that wind like a labyrinth and smoke like black powder."

== Track listing ==
No.	Title	Writer(s)	Producer(s)	Length
1.	"Intro/Freestyle"	C. Mitchell; S. Lindley	The Legendary Traxster	2:47
2.	"Ferocious"	C. Mitchell; S. Lindley	The Legendary Traxster	3:12
3.	"Just Like That" (featuring Dra Day)	C. Mitchell; M. Moore	DJ Tight Mike	3:19
4.	"Beast"	C. Mitchell; M. Moore	DJ Tight Mike	3:32
5.	"Put It Down"	C. Mitchell; D. Parker; S. Lindley	The Legendary Traxster	3:17
6.	"Swagga Like a Dopeboy"	C. Mitchell; M. Moore	DJ Tight Mike	3:14
7.	"Want My Love" (featuring DJ Victoriouz)	C. Martin; C. Mitchell; D. Woods	Lo-Key	3:50
Total length:				23:11

Notes

- Track 4 "Beast" & Track 7 "Want My love" were also released on Twista's 9th album The Dark Horse in 2014.

== Charts ==
Chart (2013)	Peak position
US Top R&B/Hip-Hop Albums (Billboard)	49
