= The Perfect Storm (album) =

Studio album by Twista
- Released: November 9, 2010
- Genre: Hip-hop
- Length: 40:20
- Labels: Get Money Gang; EMI
- Producers: The Legendary Traxster; Tight Mike; Streetrunner; J.U.S.T.I.C.E. League; The Kray Twinz; Xcel; Scorp Diesel; Don Vito; Reese G; No I.D.

Twista chronology
Category F5 (2009)	The Perfect Storm (2010)	Back to the Basics (2013)

Singles from The Perfect Storm
- 1. "I Do" Released: July 13, 2010; 2. "Make a Movie" Released: August 24, 2010

Professional ratings
Review scores
Source	Rating
About.com	3/5 stars
Allmusic	2.5/5 stars
DJBooth	3/5 stars
HipHopDX	2.5/5 stars
Prefix Magazine	(positive)
RapReviews	(7.5/10)
The Smoking Section	3/5 stars

The Perfect Storm is the eighth album by the American rapper Twista, released through his record label Get Money Gang and EMI on November 9, 2010.

It debuted at number 38 on the Billboard 200 with 14,939 units sold in its first week. By 2014, the album sold 61,000 copies. The album was largely produced by the Legendary Traxster.

== Singles ==
The first buzz single was originally scheduled to be "Ringtone" which featured additional production by Timbaland and leaked via the internet in June 2010. Because of its leak the song was scrapped as a single choice and "I Do" was released instead on July 13, 2010. The album's lead single is Make a Movie. It was released on August 24, 2010. The single originally featured R&B singer T-Pain rather than Chris Brown (both of whom made a song together), but was changed due to sample clearance.

== Track listing ==
No.	Title	Writer(s)	Producer(s)	Length
1.	"Darkness" (featuring DaWreck of Triple Darkness)	Carl Mitchell; Samuel Lindley; Samill Johnson; Curtis Kincaid	The Legendary Traxster	4:16
2.	"Up to Speed"	Mitchell; Michael Moore	Tight Mike	4:03
3.	"Make a Movie" (featuring Chris Brown)	Mitchell; Lindley; Faheem Najm; Aaron Brunson	The Legendary Traxster	3:20
4.	"I Do" (featuring Lil' Play)	Mitchell; Lindley; Derrelle Davidson	The Legendary Traxster	3:22
5.	"2012" (featuring Tia London)	Mitchell; Lindley; Latia Bell	The Legendary Traxster	4:06
6.	"Sweating" (featuring Scotty)	Mitchell; Lindley; Byron Scott Dorris	Tight Mike	3:41
7.	"Back to the Basics"	Mitchell; Lindley	The Legendary Traxster	3:32
8.	"Hands Up, Lay Down" (featuring Waka Flocka Flame)	Mitchell; Lindley; Juaquin Malphurs	The Legendary Traxster	3:35
9.	"Call the Police" (featuring Ray J)	Mitchell; Lindley; Brunson	The Legendary Traxster	3:01
10.	"Cocaine" (featuring Yo Gotti)	Mitchell; Nicholas Warwar; Mario Mims; Michael Aiello; Paolo Prudencio	Streetrunner & I.L.O.	4:22
11.	"3 Minute Murder"	Mitchell; Jatinder Hayer; Jasbir Hayer	Kray Twinz	3:02

iTunes Bonus Tracks
No.	Title	Producer(s)	Length
12.	"Give It to Me" (featuring Teala Chenae)	The Legendary Traxster	3:30
13.	"Go" (featuring Zamica)	Julkeyz; Wayne Wilkins	3:12

Best Buy Bonus Tracks
No.	Title	Producer(s)	Length
12.	"Pussy Whipped"	XCel	3:05
13.	"Bad Girl" (featuring Lloyd)	Scorp Diesel; Don Vito	4:20
14.	"Panties Off" (featuring 3pc)	Reese G	4:19
15.	"Hate in You" (featuring Gritz)	DJ Tight Mike; Street Heat	3:31
16.	"The Heat" (featuring Raekwon)	No I.D.; The Legendary Traxster	3:24
