= Dark Horse (Twista album) =

Studio album by Twista
- Released: August 12, 2014
- Recorded: 2011–2014
- Genre: Hip-hop
- Length: 48:15
- Label: Get Money Gang Entertainment; Caroline Records
- Producer: The Legendary Traxster; Xcel; DJ Tight Mike; Maxwell Smart; Cozmo; Oddz N Endz; Jonathan Whynock; Lo-Key; Trebo Beatz; P. Flawz; Chris Millionaire; R. Kelly; Twista; C-Sick

Twista chronology
Back to the Basics (2013)	Dark Horse (2014)	Crook County (2017)

Singles from Dark Horse
- 1. "Throwin' My Money" Released: May 21, 2013; 2. "It's Yours" Released: May 19, 2014

Dark Horse is the ninth album by the American rapper Twista. The album was released on August 12, 2014, by Get Money Gang Entertainment and Caroline Records. The album features guest appearances from Tyme, Dra Day, Tia London, Tech N9ne, Wiz Khalifa, Berner, DJ Victoriouz, Gritz, R. Kelly, Chief Keef and Stunt Taylor.

== Background ==
On August 16, 2011, Twista announced he had begun working on his ninth album, tilted The Dark Horse. In a May 2012, interview with AllHipHop, he spoke about where the album fits in with what he's done in the past, saying, "I think it fits in perfectly. I look at it as a continuum, or a protocol. Everybody looks forward to hearing what the Twista’s next album will sound like, in the hopes that it sounds like the original material they’ve heard. And I feel like you can always do different projects and venture out, but I definitely feel like when I go down my lane to give them the next Twista album, that I need to make sure that I satisfy the fans, so they can be like ‘yeah!’ It’s going to be the hard music mixed with the melodic music for the radio."

He also spoke about the style of the album, saying: "It’s going to be that die hard Twista style mixed in with a little bit of the new vibe. I definitely pay attention to younger artists that come out and new sounds that come out. I definitely want to make sure I’m able to artistically incorporate what I’m hearing. I like to pay attention to it and stay current. I’m always listening to the new mixtapes so that I can naturally stay on pace with the younger cats when I’m making my album. I don’t like to force it, I don’t like to sit down and think, ‘OK, let me make a song like this person.’ What I do is just keep my ear open and stay current and listen to things with what’s coming out so I can naturally."

He explained the album title, saying: "If you listen to it, and look at some of the old cats who’ve used the title before, one of The Beatles [George Harrison] was actually called “the dark horse” before, because you didn’t know how much of his musical involvement had a hand in what Beatles material came out. The dark horse meaning, like, the least expected person to win the race, or the least expected person to win the Super Bowl. I look at the dark horse as the person that you don’t always expect to see coming out on top. I consider myself a dark horse in the industry."

In a February 2014, interview with Nah Right, he spoke about what to expect from the album, saying: "New music that you expect. One thing that I’ve learned is to not steer too far from my fan base because they really appreciate what you do. You can never change the way you came out. It’s cool to try new things but you always want to give them what they expect too. So the thing that I’m happy about with this project is how much it sounds like an Adrenaline Rush anniversary almost. The songs don’t sound the same, but they definitely sound like I’m giving you what you’ve been missing from Twista. That’s what I’m happy about with this project, that it’s dope as hell."

In a July 2014, interview with XXL, he spoke about what type of songs would be on the album, saying: "For me, it’s vintage Twista giving you some feel-good songs. Meshing with people in different aspects of hip-hop. Like people might say, “Man, I want to hear Twista and Tech N9ne just rip it on a track together.” So I give you that. If you are into that laid-back or getting high vibe, you like that Wiz Khalifa vibe, me and him got the joint in there where we getting in. You on that turn up drill vibe, you gonna hear me and Chief Keef getting in on the album. Besides all of that, I am still giving you that vintage Twista sound where I am just being me. You know, I might be talking about anything from the streets to parallel universes. The subject matter is everywhere with it."

== Singles ==
On May 21, 2013, the album's first single "Throwin' My Money" featuring R. Kelly was released. On May 19, 2014, the album's second single "It's Yours" featuring Tia London was released. In a July 2014, interview with XXL, he spoke about the second single "It's Yours", saying: "Really, [its] just a song for the ladies. If you follow that traditional Twista sound when it comes to the singles, you know that I make those smooth, laid-back, melodic songs for the ladies that they always turn up to and kind of want to make YouTube videos to. It’s just following suit. Doing what I do, making one of them jams for the ladies they love that they always drop before the release of the album. This one is like a lady singing in a nice tone and telling me that it is mine. So it is me telling you that it is yours. I think people can appreciate a vintage Twista, ya dig?" On July 26, 2014, the music video was released for "It's Yours" featuring Tia London. On July 30, 2014, the music video was released for "Got Away".

== Critical reception ==
Professional ratings
Review scores
Source	Rating
AllMusic	3.5/5 stars
XXL	3/5 (L)
RapReviews	7/10

Dark Horse was met with generally positive reviews. David Jeffries of AllMusic said, "The bad news is that there's no "Overnight Sensation"-styled single, but the good news is there's no shameless effort to re-create the crossover hit. The Dark Horse may damn the corporate music industry for not giving Twista an in, but this rough-and-tumble album filled with standoffish street cuts proves that indie life suits the rapper, so expect more punch and less perfection." Kellan Miller of XXL stated, "The problem with The Dark Horse really comes down to lacking any sense of direction rather than a display of mediocre talent. Too often Twista is dragged down by the performances of his superfluous guests, or an overall misguided push for imaginative ventures. Recent veterans like Nas and Mobb Deep have cooled their attempts to nestle in the contemporary mix, effectively transitioning to the paths that propelled them past their competition in the first place. On “6 Rings,” Twista reverts to his “Kill Us All” days and ends things on a high-voltage note. One can only hope that Twista follows suit with his next project."

== Commercial performance ==
The album debuted at number 40 on the Billboard 200 chart, with first-week sales of 6,722 copies in the United States.

== Track listing ==
No.	Title	Producer(s)	Length
1.	"The Dark Horse" (featuring Tyme)	The Legendary Traxster	3:25
2.	"I Am Such a Mobsta"	The Legendary Traxster	3:25
3.	"Devil’s Angel"	P. Flawz	3:10
4.	"Beast"	DJ Tight Mike	3:32
5.	"Getting Paper" (featuring Dra Day)	DJ Tight Mike	4:03
6.	"It’s Yours" (featuring Tia London)	The Legendary Traxster	3:29
7.	"One More Joog"	Lo-Key	3:50
8.	"Crisis" (featuring Tech N9ne)	Xcel	3:23
9.	"Burnin" (featuring Wiz Khalifa and Berner)	Maxwell Smart; Cozmo	4:21
10.	"Want My Love" (featuring DJ Victoriouz)	Lo-Key	3:50
11.	"Nothing Like Me" (featuring Gritz)	The Legendary Traxster	3:47
12.	"Me and You"	The Legendary Traxster	3:24
13.	"6 Rings"	Trebo Beatz	4:36

Deluxe edition bonus tracks
No.	Title	Producer(s)	Length
14.	"Throwin' My Money" (featuring R. Kelly)	Chris Millionaire; R. Kelly; Twista	3:59
15.	"D.O.A."	DJ Tight Mike	2:56
16.	"No Friend of Me" (featuring Chief Keef and Stunt Taylor)	C-Sick	3:33
17.	"Got Away"	Oddz N Endz; Jonathan Whynock	3:07

== Charts ==
Chart (2014)	Peak position
US Billboard 200	40
US Top R&B/Hip-Hop Albums (Billboard)	8
