= Give It Up (Twista song) =

Single by Twista featuring Pharrell Williams

from the album Adrenaline Rush 2007
- Released: July 2007
- Recorded: 2006
- Genre: Hip-hop
- Length: 3:31
- Label: Atlantic
- Songwriters: Carl Mitchell; Pharrell Williams
- Producer: The Neptunes

Twista singles chronology
"Hell No (Leave Home)" (2007)	"Give It Up" (2007)	"5000 Ones" (2007)

Pharrell Williams singles chronology
"Sex 'n' Money" (2006)	"Give It Up" (2007)	"Blue Magic" (2007)

"Give It Up" is the first single from Twista's album Adrenaline Rush 2007. The song features Pharrell Williams. The edited version of the song is called "Live It Up".

== Music video ==
The music video premiered on AOL Music and on BET. It was directed by Hype Williams, and references the video for Kanye West's "Gold Digger", which was also directed by Williams. The song also has a reference to the Red Hot Chili Peppers' song, "Give It Away".

== Charts ==
Chart (2007)	Peak Position
U.S. Billboard Hot R&B/Hip-Hop Songs	88
