= Despicable Me 3 =

2017 American animated film

- Theatrical release poster
- Directed by: Pierre Coffin; Kyle Balda
- Written by: Cinco Paul; Ken Daurio
- Produced by: Chris Meledandri; Janet Healy
- Starring: Steve Carell; Kristen Wiig; Trey Parker; Pierre Coffin; Miranda Cosgrove; Steve Coogan; Jenny Slate; Dana Gaier; Nev Scharrel; Julie Andrews
- Edited by: Claire Dodgson
- Music by: Heitor Pereira
- Production companies: Universal Pictures; Illumination
- Distributed by: Universal Pictures
- Release dates: June 14, 2017 (Annecy); June 30, 2017 (United States)
- Running time: 89 minutes
- Country: United States
- Language: English
- Budget: $75−80 million
- Box office: $1.035 billion

Despicable Me 3 is a 2017 American animated comedy film directed by Pierre Coffin and Kyle Balda and written by Cinco Paul and Ken Daurio. Produced by Universal Pictures and Illumination, it is the third main installment and the fourth overall installment in the Despicable Me franchise. The film stars the voices of Steve Carell (in a dual role), Kristen Wiig, Trey Parker, Coffin, Miranda Cosgrove, Steve Coogan, Jenny Slate, Dana Gaier, Nev Scharrel and Julie Andrews. Some time after the events of Despicable Me 2 (2013), Gru teams up with his long-lost twin brother Dru to stop Balthazar Bratt (Parker), a former child actor of the 1980s, from destroying Hollywood after his show was canceled years ago.

Development on a third main Despicable Me film began in 2013 with Coffin returning as director alongside Balda. The film was in the early writing stages by 2014, while the cast was announced in 2016. Heitor Pereira and Pharrell Williams returned to compose the score.

Despicable Me 3 debuted at the Annecy International Animated Film Festival on June 14, 2017, and was theatrically released in the United States on June 30 by Universal Pictures. It received mixed reviews from critics, and grossed $1.035 billion worldwide, becoming the fourth-highest-grossing film of 2017 and the fourth-highest-grossing animated film of all time during its theatrical run. A further sequel, Despicable Me 4, was released in 2024.

== Plot ==
Married Anti-Villain League (AVL) agents Gru and Lucy Wilde are sent to recover the stolen Dumont Diamond from Balthazar Bratt, a former child star who became a supervillain after his show, Evil Bratt, was canceled. Gru recovers the diamond, while Bratt escapes. At the AVL headquarters, director Silas Ramsbottom announces his retirement, and appoints board member Valerie Da Vinci as the new director. Da Vinci dismisses Gru and Lucy from the AVL, believing they should have captured Bratt during the mission.

When Gru and Lucy return home, they tell their adopted daughters—Margo, Edith, and Agnes—of their dismissal, but assure them they will soon have new jobs. When Gru refuses to return to being a supervillain, and with his assistant Dr. Nefario accidentally frozen in carbonite, (Note: Carbonite is a fictional substance originating from the 1980 film The Empire Strikes Back.) most of his Minions abandon him to find new jobs. They are eventually prosecuted for trespassing at a television studio.

A butler named Fritz arrives at Gru's home with an invitation from his long-lost twin brother Dru, who lives in the distant country of Freedonia. The family travels to meet Dru and are surprised by his immense wealth and mansion. Meanwhile, Bratt steals the diamond again, intending to use it to power a giant robot that will destroy Hollywood, as revenge for his show's cancelation. Dru reveals to Gru that their late father was a supervillain known as "the Bald Terror", whose villainous activities and technological advances are the real source of the family's wealth. Dru wants Gru to teach him how to become a villain, but Gru refuses to revert to his old ways. While Lucy struggles with her new tasks as a mother, Dru and Gru become closer after joyriding in their father's high-tech vehicle.

Gru and Dru decide to steal the diamond; however, Gru secretly intends to bring it to the AVL to convince Da Vinci to rehire him and Lucy. They narrowly escape with the diamond and are rescued by Lucy. Dru, finding out Gru's true motives, is upset that Gru lied about teaching him how to be a villain. In return, Gru berates Dru for his incompetence, disowns him, and decides to leave Freedonia.

Bratt kidnaps the girls and reacquires the diamond. Discovering this, Gru and Dru put aside their differences; the brothers and Lucy follow Bratt in the Bald Terror's vehicle. The Minions, having escaped jail, encounter and follow them. With his robot's laser powered by the diamond, Bratt terrorizes Hollywood, covering it in superpowered chewing gum designed to lift the city into outer space. Lucy rescues the girls from a falling skyscraper as Bratt sends Gru and Dru crash-landing into the streets of Hollywood. Bratt tries to kill Gru with the robot's laser, but Dru risks his life to break into the robot and power it down from the inside. Gru engages Bratt in a final dance fight before stealing his weaponized keytar to defeat him, and send him floating away in bubble gum. Dru and Gru reconcile, and share an embrace with Lucy, Margo, Edith and Agnes.

Gru and Lucy are reinstated into the AVL. The newly-united family celebrates in Gru's home, and the girls acknowledge Lucy as their mother. Still wishing to be a supervillain, Dru, along with most of the Minions, steals Gru's rocket-powered aircraft and flies away. Gru and Lucy give them a five-minute head-start before engaging in pursuit.

== Voice cast ==
- Steve Carell as Gru, a spy and former villain turned Anti-Villain League agent. He is the adoptive father of Margo, Edith and Agnes, and Lucy's husband.
  - Carell also voices Dru, the long-lost twin brother of Gru, and the girls' adoptive uncle.
- Kristen Wiig as Lucy Wilde, an Anti-Villain League agent who is the wife of Gru, and the girls' adoptive mother
  - Wiig also voices Balthazar Bratt when he disguises himself as Lucy during his last attempt to steal the Diamond in which he also kidnaps the girls after unknowingly following Gru, Dru, and Lucy back to Freedonia.
- Trey Parker as Balthazar Bratt, a super-villain and former actor star who grew up to become obsessed with the character that he played in the 1980s and is bent on world domination Parker briefly uses a French accent for Bratt disguised as a overweight diamond inspector to steal the Dumont Diamond from a Paris museum in the beginning of the movie.
- Pierre Coffin as the Minions
  - Coffin also voices a museum director and does additional voices with Kyle Balda
- Miranda Cosgrove as Margo, the oldest and clever adopted daughter of Lucy and Gru
- Dana Gaier as Edith, the middle and mischievous adopted daughter of Lucy and Gru
- Nev Scharrel as Agnes, the youngest and innocent adopted daughter of Lucy and Gru. She was originally voiced by Elsie Fisher in the first two films
- Jenny Slate as Valerie Da Vinci, a tyrannical member of the Anti-Villain League who becomes the new AVL director
- Steve Coogan as Silas Ramsbottom, the director of the Anti-Villain League, who retires at the beginning of the film
  - Coogan also voices Fritz, Dru's butler.
- Julie Andrews as Gru and Dru's mother

Additionally, Andy Nyman voices Clive the robot, Bratt's sidekick, and Adrian Ciscato voices Niko, a boy from Freedonia who falls in love with Margo.

== Production ==
=== Development ===
Development on Despicable Me 3 began in 2013 after the release of Despicable Me 2, when production and character designer Eric Guillon began supervising the process as a co-director with Pierre Coffin and Kyle Balda, both of whom had concluded work on Minions (2015). While the development was underway in 2014, Illumination CEO Chris Meledandri reported that the film was in early writing stages. The production team intended to give each Despicable Me film its own "larger narrative positioning", allowing the expansion of the main characters' stories.

=== Casting ===
In April 2016, it was reported that Steve Carell would reprise his role as Gru and also voice his twin brother Dru, and that Trey Parker was cast as Balthazar Bratt. Parker said he accepted the role to have a work that he could watch with his infant daughter, adding that he had seen and liked Illumination's films with her, and that he found amusing doing something that was not written by him, the first time he had done so since BASEketball in 1998. He compared Balthazar Bratt to Kirk Cameron, who "got really religious, and he just seemed so pissed" and considered imitating Cameron for his performance. In September 2016, it was announced that Miranda Cosgrove and Kristen Wiig would reprise their roles as Margo and Lucy Wilde, respectively, and that Nev Scharrel would replace Elsie Fisher as Agnes.

== Music ==
The soundtrack for Despicable Me 3 was released on June 23, 2017. Pharrell Williams released the new song "Yellow Light" for the soundtrack, which was made available through digital download and streaming.

== Marketing and release ==
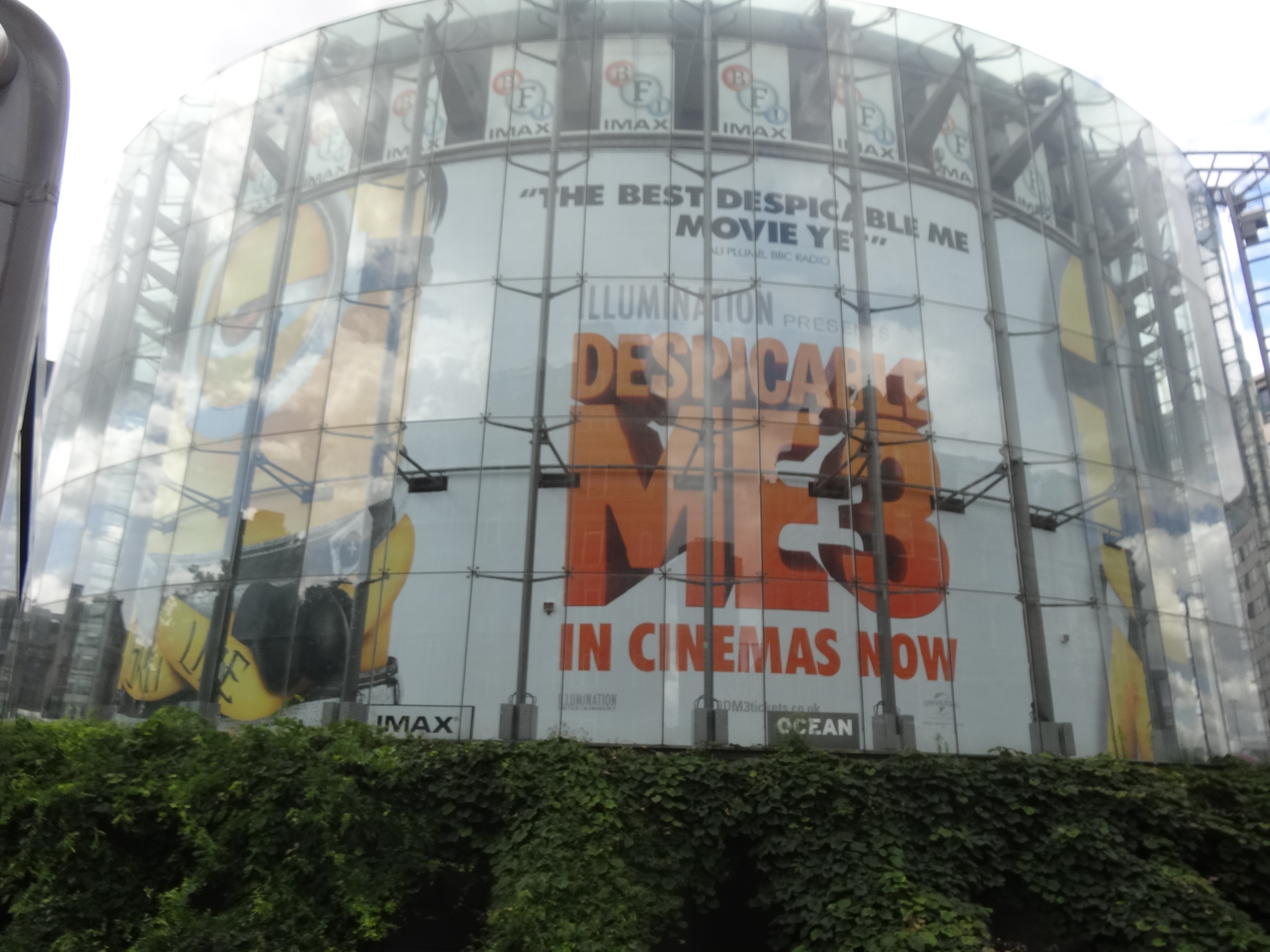
Poster for the film at the BFI IMAX in London, England

The marketing campaign of Despicable Me 3 included promotions, such as the star ratings being replaced with the Minions during Amazon's "Minion Day", and BuzzFeed's "character takeover" badges. In New York City, 600 taxicabs had the sculpted Minions atop of them, of which had a Minionese greeting. Additional marketing partners for the film included 23 & Me, Chiquita, Ferrero, Kellogg's, McDonald's, Procter & Gamble, Topps and Yummy Spoonfuls.

Despicable Me 3 debuted at the Annecy International Animated Film Festival on June 14, 2017, followed by a premiere on June 24, at the Shrine Auditorium in Los Angeles. The film was released in the United States on June 30.

=== Home media ===
Universal Pictures Home Entertainment released Despicable Me 3 for digital download on November 21, 2017, and on 4K Ultra HD Blu-ray, Blu-ray and DVD on December 5. Physical copies contain The AVL Database, behind-the-scenes featurettes, character descriptions, a Freedonian map, a deleted scene, a "Doowit" sing-along version, Minion mugshots and posters, a short film entitled The Secret Life of Kyle, and a "Yellow Light" music video.

== Reception ==
=== Box office ===
Despicable Me 3 earned $264.6 million in the United States and Canada and $770.2 million in other territories for a worldwide total of $1.035 billion. It was the fourth-highest-grossing film of 2017 and the fourth-highest-grossing animated film of all time. Deadline Hollywood calculated its net profit at $366.2 million, accounting for production budgets, marketing, talent participation and other costs; box-office grosses and home media revenues placed it third on their list of 2017's "Most Valuable Blockbusters".

In the United States and Canada, Despicable Me 3 was released with The House and Baby Driver. The film grossed $29.2 million on its first day, including $4.1 million from Thursday night previews. During its opening weekend, Despicable Me 3 grossed $75.4 million across 4,529 theaters, which was increased to 4,535 the following week, making it the number-one film. This surpassed the record of The Twilight Saga: Eclipse's (2010) 4,468 theaters to become the widest release ever until Avengers: Endgame (2019) took over with 4,662. (Note: Attributed to multiple references:) The film fell to number two in its second weekend with a gross of $34 million, and number six in its third with $19.4 million. Despicable Me 3 left theaters by December 21, 2017.

Worldwide, Despicable Me 3 grossed $9.9 million during its opening weekend in five markets on June 16. This was followed by its third weekend, grossing $95.6 million with an increased market count of 46. Its top international markets were China ($158.2 million), Japan ($66.2 million), the United Kingdom ($62.7 million), Germany ($43.8 million) and France ($41.4 million).

=== Critical response ===
The film has an approval rating of 58% based on 193 professional reviews on the review aggregator website Rotten Tomatoes, with an average rating of 5.7/10. Its critical consensus reads, "Despicable Me 3 should keep fans of the franchise consistently entertained with another round of colorful animation and zany—albeit somewhat scattershot—humor." Metacritic (which uses a weighted average) assigned the film a score of 49 out of 100 based on 37 critics, indicating "mixed or average" reviews. Audiences polled by CinemaScore gave the film an average grade of "A−" on an A+ to F scale, down from the first two films' and Minions's (2015) "A".

Alex Welch of IGN gave the film a six out of ten score, saying, "It's not much, but Despicable Me 3 is at least enough for the younger fans of the franchise." Peter Debruge of Variety wrote, "Despicable Me 3 is unwieldy, but it mostly works, as co-directors Pierre Coffin (who also voices the Minions) and Kyle Balda never lose sight of the film's emotional center, packing the rest with as much humor as they can manage. The jokes come so fast and furious, the movie can hardly find room for Heitor Pereira's funky score, and though Pharrell Williams has contributed five new songs to sell soundtracks (including the sweet "There's Something Special"), the movie hardly needs them." Alonso Duralde of TheWrap gave the film a mixed review, saying: "Ultimately, none of these flaws will matter to the throngs of little kids who have made the previous Despicable Me movies (and the superior Minions spin-off) into giant global hits."

Sandy Schaefer for Screen Rant gives the film a three stars out of five saying "Despicable Me 3 offers enough in the way of zany, irreverent entertainment (with a dose of heart) to please steadfast fans of the franchise." In a four out of five review, Tara Brady of The Irish Times wrote, "Think of it, in terms of quality, as The Good, The Bad and The Ugly of the Despicable Me films." Jordan Mintzer for The Hollywood Reporter gave the film a positive review saying "This rather clever, breakneck-paced cartoon gives fans exactly what they want: Like the new nemesis voiced by Trey Parker, it shoots multiple machine-gun bursts of bubblegum at the audience, asking them to chew and enjoy" Peter Travers of Rolling Stone gave the film three stars out of four, saying "Pierre Coffin (who voices the Minions) and co-director Kyle Balda keep the plot spinning merrily. Pharrell Williams contributes five new songs to the mix, including the hummable "There's Something Special." It's no mystery why Illumination's franchise is still something special after three go-rounds—the box-office gross is a whopping $1.5 billion and counting." Leah Greenblatt of Entertainment Weekly gave the film a 'B' grade, saying "What shines through is the visual wit and innate sweetness of the storytelling, and Carell's cackling, cueball-skulled misanthrope a (mostly) reformed scoundrel who can still have his cake, and arsenic too."

The Minions' nonsense pastiche of the "Major-General's Song" was termed "amusing" (in an otherwise negative review) and "the film's finest moment"; it was uploaded to YouTube by Illumination as a singalong challenge and had garnered more than 19 million views as of 2023.

== Accolades ==
Accolades received by Despicable Me 3
Award	Date of ceremony	Category	Recipient(s)	Result	Ref.
American Cinema Editors Awards	January 26, 2018	Best Edited Animated Feature Film	Claire Dodgson	Nominated	
Annie Awards	February 3, 2018	Best Animated Feature	Despicable Me 3	Nominated	
Annie Awards	February 3, 2018	Outstanding Achievement for Animated Effects in an Animated Production	Bruno Chauffard, Frank Baradat, Nicolas Brack and Milo Riccarand	Nominated	
Annie Awards	February 3, 2018	Outstanding Achievement for Character Design in a Feature Production	Eric Guillon	Nominated	
Art Directors Guild Awards	January 27, 2018	Excellence in Production Design for an Animated Film	Olivier Adam	Nominated	
Cinema Audio Society Awards	February 24, 2018	Outstanding Achievement in Sound Mixing for a Motion Picture – Animated	Carlos Sotolongo, Randy Thom, Tim Nielson, Brandon Proctor, Greg Hayes and Scott Curtis	Nominated	
Critics' Choice Movie Awards	January 11, 2018	Best Animated Film	Despicable Me 3	Nominated	
Golden Reel Awards	February 18, 2018	Outstanding Achievement in Sound Editing – Sound Effects, Foley, Dialogue and ADR for Animated Feature Film	Dennis Leonard, Tim Nielsen, Matthew Hartman, Mac Smith, Andre J.H. Zweers, Christopher Flick, Richard Gould, John Roesch, Shelley Roden and Slamm Andrews	Nominated	
Golden Trailer Awards	June 6, 2017	Best Animation/Family	"Brothers" (Motive Creative)	Nominated	
Golden Trailer Awards	June 6, 2017	Best Animation/Family Poster	"Oh Brother Poster" (Lindeman & Associates)	Nominated	
Golden Trailer Awards	May 31, 2018	Best Animation/Family	"Mojo" (Workshop Creative)	Nominated	
Golden Trailer Awards	May 31, 2018	Best Animation/Family TV Spot	"Evil Mastermind" (Workshop Creative)	Nominated	
Hollywood Music in Media Awards	November 17, 2017	Best Original Song in an Animated Film	Pharrell Williams for "There's Something Special"	Nominated	
Houston Film Critics Society Awards	January 6, 2018	Best Animated Film	Despicable Me 3	Nominated	
Movieguide Awards	February 2, 2018	Best Movies for Families	Despicable Me 3	Nominated	
Nickelodeon Kids' Choice Awards	March 24, 2018	Favorite Animated Movie	Despicable Me 3	Nominated	
Producers Guild of America Awards	January 20, 2018	Best Animated Motion Picture	Chris Meledandri and Janet Healy	Nominated	
Saturn Awards	June 27, 2018	Best Animated Film	Despicable Me 3	Nominated	
St. Louis Film Critics Association Awards	December 17, 2017	Best Animated Film	Despicable Me 3	Nominated	
Visual Effects Society Awards	February 13, 2018	Outstanding Visual Effects in an Animated Feature	Pierre Coffin, Chris Meledandri, Kyle Balda and Eric Guillon	Nominated	
Visual Effects Society Awards	February 13, 2018	Outstanding Animated Character in an Animated Feature	Eric Guillon, Bruno Dequier, Julien Soret, and Benjamin Fournet for "Bratt"	Nominated	
Visual Effects Society Awards	February 13, 2018	Outstanding Created Environment in an Animated Feature	Axelle De Cooman, Pierre Lopes, Milo Riccarand, and Nicolas Brack for "Hollywood Destruction"	Nominated	
Visual Effects Society Awards	February 13, 2018	Outstanding Model in a Photoreal or Animated Project	Eric Guillon, Francois-Xavier Lepeintre, Guillaume Boudeville, and Pierre Lopes for "Dru's Car"	Nominated	
Visual Effects Society Awards	February 13, 2018	Outstanding Effects Simulations in an Animated Feature	Bruno Chauffard, Frank Baradat, Milo Riccarand and Nicolas Brack	Nominated	
Washington D.C. Area Film Critics Association Awards	December 8, 2017	Best Animated Feature	Despicable Me 3	Nominated	

== Sequel ==
A sequel, Despicable Me 4, was released on 3 July 2024. Despite garnering mixed critical reception, the film saw box office success, grossing $986.7 million on a $100 million budget.

== Works cited ==
- Croll, Ben (July 12, 2022). The Art of Eric Guillon: From the Making of Despicable Me to Minions, The Secret Life of Pets, and More. San Rafael, California: Insight Editions. ISBN 9781683836810.
