= Make a Movie =

Single by Twista featuring Chris Brown

from the album The Perfect Storm
- Released: August 24, 2010
- Recorded: 2010
- Genre: Hip hop; R&B
- Length: 3:20
- Label: Get Money Gang Entertainment; EMI
- Songwriters: Carl Terrell Mitchell; Samuel Lindley; Faheem Najm
- Producer: The Legendary Traxster

Twista singles chronology
"I Do" (2010)	"Make a Movie" (2010)	"Welcome to My Hood (Remix)" (2011)

Chris Brown singles chronology
"Deuces" (2010)	"Make a Movie" (2010)	"Yeah 3x" (2010)

"Make a Movie" is a song by American rapper Twista featuring American singer Chris Brown, released by Get Money Gang and EMI on August 24, 2010 as the second single from the former's eighth studio album, The Perfect Storm (2010). Written by Twista alongside its producer the Legendary Traxster and American singer T-Pain, it is the only song from the album to enter the Billboard Hot 100—on which it peaked at number 71.

== Background ==
The song was put down as being unoriginal, as there been other songs titled "Make a Movie" about making sex tapes, such as "Make a Movie" by Chamillionaire, which Twista is featured on. The original version of the track featured T-Pain on the hook but the final version features Chris Brown. The collaboration was said to be unexpected and geared towards a pop audience. Twista explained that the collaboration came around due to mutual respect between the two. The song was described by Rap-Up as "Twista spiting his rapid flow while Chris Brown croons over the seductive track."

== Critical reception ==
The critical reception to "Make A Movie" was generally mixed. AllMusic's David Jeffries was also critical: "when Twista compares his shutter speed to his sex speed on 'Make a Movie', it's a cringe-worthy moment even R. Kelly would avoid". DJBooth.net also wrote a mixed review: "Make a Movie, a quasi-R rated jam that brings on recovering superstar Chris Brown for a Kardashian inspired ode to cinematic intercourse. Like much of Twista's more radio ready work, it's not particularly impressive, but unless you're dead set against having a good time you won't be able to stop your head from nodding." William E. Ketchum III of HipHopDX wrote a more positive review: "Even though 'Make A Movie' is formulaic, it wins with its cheesy porno references, a solid Chris Brown chorus, and a silky instrumental." RapReviews was also positive about the song: "there are songs like 'Make a Movie' featuring Chris Brown which harken back to the freak flop flow of 'Slow Jamz', with the perfectly contradictory combination of fast slung lyrics to slow quiet storm grooves."

== Music video ==
The music video debuted on MTV on September 8, 2010. It was directed by Colin Tilley. It was described as tame compared to the subject matter.

== Charts ==
=== Weekly charts ===
Chart (2010–2011)	Peak position
US Billboard Hot 100	71
US Hot R&B/Hip-Hop Songs (Billboard)	6
US Hot Rap Songs (Billboard)	6
US Rhythmic Airplay (Billboard)	28

=== Year-end charts ===
Chart (2011)	Position
US Hot R&B/Hip-Hop Songs (Billboard)	22

== Certifications ==
Certifications from "Make a Movie"
Region	Certification	Certified units/sales
United States (RIAA)	Gold	500,000^{‡}
^{‡} Sales+streaming figures based on certification alone.

== Release history ==
Region	Date	Format
United States	August 24, 2010	Digital download
United States	November 9, 2010	CD track
United States	November 30, 2010	Radio airplay
