= Angel (Pharrell Williams song) =

Single by Pharrell

from the album In My Mind
- Released: December 12, 2005
- Recorded: 2005
- Genre: R&B
- Length: 2:45
- Label: Virgin; Star Trak; Interscope
- Songwriter: Pharrell Williams
- Producer: Pharrell Williams

Pharrell singles chronology
"I Ain't Heard of That" (2005)	"Angel" (2005)	"Mr. Me Too" (2006)

"Angel" is the second single from Pharrell Williams' debut album In My Mind (2006).

The song debuted on November 29, 2005 in the United Kingdom and was backed heavily by BBC Radio 1, where at one point it was their most played record. It was also made Record of the Week by DJ Scott Mills.

The single was not released in the United States or Australia due to the underperformance of "Can I Have It Like That" in both countries.

== Music video ==
There are two versions of the "Angel" music video. The first video, which was never released to television, combined both animation and live action shots. The second video, directed by Hype Williams, was the version released to television in the United Kingdom and is the more widely known version.

== Track listing ==
UK CD

1. "Angel" (radio version)
2. "Angel" (Axwell remix)

UK DVD

1. "Angel" (instrumental)
2. "Angel" (video)
3. "Can I Have It Like That" (featuring Gwen Stefani) (video)

UK vinyl

1. "Angel" (radio version)
2. "Angel" (instrumental)
3. "Angel" (Axwell remix)
4. "Angel" (a cappella)

UK promo CD

1. "Angel" (radio version)
2. "Angel" (album version) (explicit)
3. "Angel" (instrumental)
4. "Angel" (a cappella)

== Charts ==
Chart (2006)	Peak position
Australia (ARIA)	44
Belgium (Ultratip Bubbling Under Flanders)	3
Belgium (Ultratip Bubbling Under Wallonia)	12
Denmark (Tracklisten)	9
Germany (GfK)	62
Ireland (IRMA)	20
Italy (FIMI)	16
Netherlands (Dutch Top 40)	35
Netherlands (Single Top 100)	35
Scotland Singles (OCC)	20
UK Singles (OCC)	15
UK Hip Hop/R&B (OCC)	3

== Release history ==
Release dates and formats for "Angel"
Region	Date	Format	Label	Ref.
United States	December 12, 2005	CHR/rhythmic radio; urban radio	Interscope	
