= Roc Boys (And the Winner Is)... =

Single by Jay-Z

from the album American Gangster
- Released: October 10, 2007
- Recorded: 2007
- Genre: Hip hop; jazz rap
- Length: 4:12
- Label: Roc-A-Fella; Def Jam
- Songwriter: Shawn Carter
- Producer: Diddy, Skyz Muzik, The Hitmen

Jay-Z singles chronology
"Blue Magic" (2007)	"Roc Boys (And the Winner Is)..." (2007)	"I Know" (2007)

Music video
- "Roc Boys (And the Winner Is)..." on YouTube

"Roc Boys (And the Winner Is)..." is the second single from Jay-Z's tenth studio album, American Gangster. The song is produced by Diddy, Skyz Muzik, and two of his producers known as LV and Sean C from his production team, The Hitmen. It features additional vocals by Beyoncé, Kanye West and Cassie. The song samples "Make the Road by Walking" by The Menahan Street Band. On December 11, 2007, Rolling Stone named it the best song of 2007.

== Music video ==
The music video was directed by Chris Robinson and costume designed by June Ambrose. The video was shot in New York City in Jay-Z's The 40/40 Club.

The intro of the video contains the chorus from Hello Brooklyn 2.0. The video features cameo appearances by Nas, Rick Ross, Memphis Bleek, Diddy, Freeway, Terrence J, Tru Life, Young Gunz, Jadakiss, Yaya DaCosta, Swizz Beatz, Drew Sidora, Kristia Krueger, Chain 4, Chantel, Beanie Sigel, Cassie, DJ Clue, Larry Johnson, Tristan Wilds, Just Blaze, Zab Judah, The-Dream, Irv Gotti and Mariah Carey. Kanye West is not featured in the video because of a scheduling conflict, at the time he was on tour in Dubai, as posted in his blog.

The young Jay-Z was portrayed by actor Samgoma Edwards. Director Chris Robinson personally sought out Edwards for the role after Edwards and his older brother Samtubia Edwards and friend Chris Alvarez shot their own video project titled "The Young Hov Project", based on tracks from Jay-Z's The Black Album.

== Remixes and sampling ==
Beanie Sigel announced that he and Jadakiss had finished the official remix of the track, featuring both of them on vocals. An alternate remix features Young Chris of the Young Gunz and Busta Rhymes.

Rapper Asher Roth extensively samples "Roc Boys (And the Winner Is)..." in his own version, "Roth Boys", released on his debut mixtape, The Greenhouse Effect.

Numerous freestyles were recorded by artists such as Wale (on The Mixtape About Nothing) and Rick Ross.

The Game and Lil Wayne also sampled the song in "Red Magic", with Lil Wayne singing excerpts of the chorus.

A similarly titled song by rapper and Jay-Z collaborator Saigon appears on his debut album, The Greatest Story Never Told.

The song was also sampled in Girl Talk's song "Set It Off" and in a remix produced by Norwegian DJ Matoma.

== Charts ==
=== Weekly charts ===
Chart (2007)	Peak position
US Billboard Hot 100	63
US Hot R&B/Hip-Hop Songs (Billboard)	15
US Hot Rap Songs (Billboard)	8
US Rhythmic Airplay (Billboard)	21

=== Year-end charts ===
Chart (2008)	Position
US Hot R&B/Hip-Hop Songs (Billboard)	98

== In popular culture ==
The instrumental version of “Roc Boys” is played at San Francisco Giants home games at Oracle Park as starting lineups are introduced.

Blue Ash is a suburb of Cincinnati.

== See also ==
- List of songs recorded by Jay-Z
