= Announcement (song) =

Single by Common

from the album Universal Mind Control
- Released: July 1, 2008
- Recorded: 2008
- Genre: Hip-hop
- Length: 3:58
- Label: GOOD Music; Geffen
- Songwriters: Lonnie Lynn; Pharrell Williams; Charles Hugo
- Producer: The Neptunes

Common singles chronology
"Universal Mind Control" (2008)	"Announcement" (2008)	"Make Her Say" (2009)

Pharrell singles chronology
"Universal Mind Control" (2008)	"Announcement" (2008)	"I Apologize" (2009)

"Announcement" is the second single released by Common from his 2008 album Universal Mind Control. The single was produced by The Neptunes and features Pharrell. The song was released as a 3-track digital EP. It samples "Dreams" by The Notorious B.I.G.

== Track listing ==
Digital EP

1. "Announcement" (Explicit) - 3:58
2. "Universal Mind Control (UMC)" (Explicit) - 3:26
3. "Universal Mind Control (UMC) [Instrumental]"

== Chart positions ==
Chart (2008)	Peak position
US Hot R&B/Hip-Hop Songs (Billboard)	94
