= Number One (Pharrell Williams song) =

Single by Pharrell featuring Kanye West

from the album In My Mind
- B-side: "Swagger International"; "Raspy"
- Released: August 21, 2006
- Genre: Pop rap; R&B
- Length: 3:56
- Label: Virgin; Star Trak; Interscope
- Songwriters: Pharrell Williams; Kanye West
- Producer: Pharrell Williams

Pharrell singles chronology
"Money Maker" (2006)	"Number One" (2006)	"That Girl" (2006)

Kanye West singles chronology
"Grammy Family" (2006)	"Number One" (2006)	"Wouldn't Get Far" (2007)

"Number One" is a song by American musician Pharrell Williams featuring American rapper Kanye West, released by Star Trak Entertainment and Virgin Records on August 21, 2006 as the third single from Williams' debut studio album, In My Mind (2006). A synth-heavy love song, it was written by both performers. Production was handled by Williams, while West acts as the song's hype man and performs the third verse.

"Number One" became the second song from In My Mind to enter the Billboard Hot 100, where it peaked at number 57. The song was praised by critics, in contrast from its parent album.

== Music video ==
The music video was directed by Hype Williams, and features models Selita Ebanks, Miranda Kerr, and Rosie Huntington-Whiteley. There are two versions: one is a color version which features many bright colors and the other is in black and white. For unknown reasons, the official music video uploaded on YouTube is no longer available globally.

== Track listing ==
UK CD

1. "Number One" (Featuring Kanye West) (Explicit Album Version)
2. "Swagger International"
3. "Raspy"
4. "Number One" (Featuring Kanye West) (Video)

UK Vinyl

1. "Number One" (Featuring Kanye West) (Explicit Album Version)
2. "Raspy"

UK Promo CD

1. "Number One" (Featuring Kanye West) (Clean Version)

== Charts ==
Chart (2006)	Peak position
Belgium (Ultratip Bubbling Under Flanders)	8
Scottish Singles Sales (Official Charts)	38
UK Singles (Official Charts)	31
UK Hip Hop/R&B (Official Charts)	10
US Billboard Hot 100	57
US Hot R&B/Hip-Hop Songs (Billboard)	40
