= Adrenaline Rush 2007 =

Studio album by Twista
- Released: September 18, 2007
- Recorded: 2006–07
- Genres: Hip-hop; R&B; dirty rap
- Label: Atlantic
- Producers: Basement Beats; Cuzzo; Jazze Pha; R. Kelly; The Neptunes; Toxic

Twista chronology
| The Day After (2005) | Adrenaline Rush 2007 (2007) | Category F5 (2009) |

Singles from Adrenaline Rush 2007
- 1. "Give It Up" Released: 2007; 2. "Creep Fast" Released: 2007

Professional ratings
Review scores
| Source | Rating |
|---|---|
| AllHipHop | (8/10) |
| Allmusic | 3.5/5 stars |
| DJBooth.net | 4/5 stars |
| HipHopDX | 3.5/5 stars |
| The New York Times | (average) |
| Pitchfork Media | (4.4/10) |
| RapReviews | (5.5/10) |
| Vibe | (positive) |
| XXL | 4/5 stars |

Adrenaline Rush 2007 is the fifth studio album by Chicago rapper Twista. It was released on September 18, 2007. The "2007" in the title references the ten years passed since his third studio album Adrenaline Rush. The first official single from the album was "Give It Up", featuring Pharrell and "Creep Fast (Feat. T-Pain)" was the second single. The professional review from XXL states that the content of commercial and raw talent is a good mix. The album has received generally favorable reviews.

The album debuted at #10 on the U.S. Billboard 200 music chart, selling over 41,000 copies in its 1st week; this was marketed poorer than the first week performance of The Day After, which debuted #2 with about 130,000 copies sold. The album also dropped off the charts quickly, falling to #48 in its second week with over 20,000 copies sold, then falling off the Top 100.

As of June 2008, the album had sold over 365,000 copies.

== Track listing ==
| No. | Title | Writer(s) | Producer(s) | Length |
|---|---|---|---|---|
| 1. | "Adrenaline Rush the Saga Continues..." | | Toxic | 1:17 |
| 2. | "Charged" | Carl Mitchell; Frederick Taylor | Toxic | 2:47 |
| 3. | "What T Is?" (Skit) | | Toxic | 0:26 |
| 4. | "I Ain't That Nigga" | Mitchell; Taylor | Toxic | 3:22 |
| 5. | "Say Say" (featuring CeeLo Green, Jazze Pha, and Big Zak) | Mitchell; CeeLo Green; Phalon Alexander; Zachary Wallace; Stan Vincent; Clifton Chase; Edward Fletcher; Melvin Glover; Sylvia Robinson | Jazze Pha | 4:28 |
| 6. | "Whip Game Proper" (featuring Lil Wayne) | Mitchell; Michael Moore; Dwayne Carter | Cuzo | 4:19 |
| 7. | "No Pistols" (featuring Speedknot Mobstaz) | Mitchell; Taylor; Calvin Thomas; Jabari Bristow | Toxic | 3:57 |
| 8. | "Phone" (Skit) | | Toxic | 0:16 |
| 9. | "Love Rehab" (featuring R. Kelly) | Mitchell; Robert Kelly | R. Kelly | 3:58 |
| 10. | "Seven Day Hustle" (featuring Toxic) | Mitchell; Taylor; Doris Coley; Addie Harris; Beverly Lee; Shirley Owens | Toxic | 3:49 |
| 11. | "Creep Fast" (featuring T-Pain) | Mitchell; Taylor; Faheem Najm; Hal Davis; Herman Griffith | Toxic | 3:31 |
| 12. | "Wrist Stay Rocky" | Mitchell; Evan Fountaine | NonStop | 3:41 |
| 13. | "What Would Twista Do If He Wasn't Rappin'" (Skit) | | Toxic | 1:06 |
| 14. | "Give It Up" (featuring Pharrell) | Mitchell; Pharrell Williams | The Neptunes | 3:31 |
| 15. | "The Come Up" | Mitchell; Taylor | Toxic | 4:08 |
| 16. | "Ain't No Hoes" (featuring Bone Thugs-n-Harmony) | Mitchell; Moore; Anthony Henderson; Steven Howse | Cuzo | 5:13 |
| 17. | "Pimp Like Me" | Mitchell; Moore | Cuzo | 4:06 |
| 18. | "Ya With It or Ya Ain't" (Skit) | | Toxic | 1:52 |
| 19. | "Trouble" | Mitchell; Moore | Cuzo | 4:23 |
| 20. | "Be a Hustla" (Circuit City Bonus Track) | | Toxic | 4:09 |
| 21. | "Heist" (Circuit City Bonus Track) | | Toxic | 4:06 |
| 22. | "Bussin' No Discussin'" (iTunes Bonus Track) | | Cuzo | 4:03 |

Sample credits

- "Say Say" contains interpolations from the compositions:
  - "O-o-h Child", written by Stan Vincent.
  - "The Message", written by Clifton Chase, Edward Fletcher, Melvin Glover, and Sylvia Robinson.
- "Seven Day Hustle" contains a sample of "I Met Him on a Sunday", written by Doris Coley, Addie Harris, Beverly Lee, and Shirley Owens; as performed by The Shirelles.
- "Creep Fast" contains samples from "Can I", written by Hal Davis and Herman Griffith, as performed by Eddie Kendricks.

== Other Tracks ==
- "Blessed" (featuring Jessi Malay) (Produced by ???)
- "Well It's Time" (Produced by Kanye West)
- "Talk Hard" (featuring Kanjia, Pitbull, & E-40) (Produced by Core DJ's)
- "Two Times for My Nigga" (Produced by ???)
- "Ass Whoop" (featuring Saigon) (Produced by Just Blaze)

=== Singles ===
- "Give It Up"
- "Creep Fast"
- "Pimp Like Me"
