= Universal Mind Control =

2008 studio album by Common

Studio album by Common
- Released: December 9, 2008
- Recorded: 2008
- Genre: Hip-hop
- Length: 38:00
- Labels: GOOD; Geffen
- Producers: Pharrell Williams (exec.); The Neptunes (also co-exec.); Kanye West (also co-exec.); Common (co-exec.); Derek Dudley (co-exec.); Mike Chavez (co-exec.); Mr. DJ

Common chronology
Finding Forever (2007)	Universal Mind Control (2008)	The Dreamer/The Believer (2011)

Singles from Universal Mind Control
- 1. "Universal Mind Control" Released: July 1, 2008; 2. "Announcement" Released: July 1, 2008

Universal Mind Control is the eighth studio album by American rapper Common. Originally scheduled to be released on June 24, 2008 under the name Invincible Summer, the release date was pushed back to September 30, 2008 due to Common's acting gig in the film Wanted. However, on September 10, 2008, it was announced that the title would be changed to Universal Mind Control and the release date was set for November 11, 2008. Later, the release was pushed back to December 9, 2008.

The album's first single, titled "Universal Mind Control", was officially released on July 1, 2008 via the US iTunes Store as part of the Announcement EP (sold as "Universal Mind Control-EP" in the UK). The Announcement EP included an additional track titled "Announcement". The album features executive production and extensive creative involvement from The Neptunes, namely Pharrell Williams. The album is Common's third and final project released under Geffen Records and Kanye West's record label GOOD Music, as well as his final album to feature any involvement from West.

The video for "Universal Mind Control" was filmed in September by director Hype Williams. The album was sold for 79 points (roughly $.99) on Zune Marketplace to help promote the album. In 2010, the album was nominated for a Grammy Award for Best Rap Album but lost to the Eminem album Relapse.

== Reception ==
Professional ratings
Aggregate scores
Source	Rating
Metacritic	53/100
Review scores
Source	Rating
AllMusic	2.5/5 stars
Entertainment Weekly	C
The Guardian	4/5 stars
Los Angeles Times	2.5/4 stars
Pitchfork	2.8/10
PopMatters	3/10
RapReviews	5.5/10
Rolling Stone	3/5 stars
Sputnikmusic	1.5/5
Vibe	2/5 stars

Billboard magazine has described the sound as "electro-tinged" and "techno-inspired." The album has largely divided critics and fans, with Pitchfork awarding just 2.8 out of 10, yet The Guardian gave it 4 stars of out 5; USA Today gave it three-and-a-half out of four stars; Spin gave it seven out of ten; and XXL gave it three out of five stars. Metacritic, the score aggregator, calculated a score of 53 out of 100, indicating "mixed or average reviews".

Uncut gave it a score of four out of five stars and said, "Tough and determinedly sexed-up, here you'll find talk of beefs, booty and bitches, rather than brotherhood. Producers Neptunes and OutKast's Mr DJ oversee this exercise in alluringly modern hip hop." The A.V. Club gave it a C+ and said, "Common stops trying to save the world and uplift the human spirit, and gets in touch with his inner freak, with results that are often more bewildering than sexy." Paste gave it a score of 5.3 out of 10 and said, "Common's inability to sound sincere about a man he spent two years championing is the most telling part of this consciously shallow caricature of hip-hop's dregs." Slant Magazine gave it a score of two stars out of five and said that although the album "represents a serious step backward from the successes of his recent projects with Kanye, it would be remiss to say the album is the death knell for Common's career or that he has fallen off in any significant way." Canadian magazine Now also gave it a score of two out of five and said it had "no shortage of sick beats, but Common’s decision to dumb down his rhymes to a rude and rudimentary level comes off horribly crass at best and at worst downright embarrassing."

=== Commercial performance ===
In its first week, Universal Mind Control sold 81,663 in the United States. As of December 31, 2008, the album has sold 211,781.

== Track listing ==
No.	Title	Writer(s)	Producer(s)	Length
1.	"Intro / Universal Mind Control" (featuring Pharrell)	Lonnie Lynn; Pharrell Williams; Chad Hugo	The Neptunes	3:34
2.	"Punch Drunk Love (The Eye)" (featuring Kanye West)	Lynn; Williams; Hugo; Kanye West	The Neptunes	4:15
3.	"Make My Day" (featuring Cee-Lo Green)	Lynn; Thomas Callaway; Jeff Bowden; Jason Boyd; David Sheats; Dukes Of Daville	Mr. DJ	3:59
4.	"Sex 4 Suga"	Lynn; Williams; Hugo	The Neptunes	4:03
5.	"Announcement" (featuring Pharrell)	Lynn; Williams; Hugo	The Neptunes	3:46
6.	"Gladiator" (featuring Pharrell)	Lynn; Williams; Hugo	The Neptunes	4:07
7.	"Changes" (featuring Muhsinah and Omoye Assata Lynn)	Lynn; Sheats; Bowden	Mr. DJ	3:58
8.	"Inhale"	Lynn; Williams; Hugo	The Neptunes	3:12
9.	"What a World" (featuring Chester French)	Lynn; Williams; Hugo	The Neptunes	3:58
10.	"Everywhere" (featuring Martina Topley-Bird)	Lynn; Sheats; Martina Topley-Bird	Mr. DJ	3:15

iTunes bonus track
No.	Title	Writer(s)	Producer(s)	Length
11.	"Break My Heart" (Live)	Lynn; West	Kanye West	3:26

UK bonus track
No.	Title	Writer(s)	Producer(s)	Length
11.	"Punch Drunk Love" (Booty Shake Remix) (featuring Pharrell)	Lynn; Williams; Hugo	The Neptunes	4:33

== Charts ==
=== Weekly charts ===
Chart (2008)	Peak position
US Billboard 200	12
US Top R&B/Hip-Hop Albums (Billboard)	4
US Top Rap Albums (Billboard)	1

=== Year-end charts ===
Chart (2009)	Position
US Billboard 200	149
US Top R&B/Hip-Hop Albums (Billboard)	39

== Release history ==
Country	Date
United States	December 9, 2008
Canada	December 9, 2008
United Kingdom	March 6, 2009
Poland	March 6, 2009
Mexico	December 24, 2008
Spain	April 7, 2009
Brazil	May 12, 2009
China	December 10, 2008
Russia	December 10, 2008
Japan	January 6, 2009
New Zealand	November 17, 2008
Europe	November 17, 2008
Australia	November 17, 2008
