= I Know (Jay-Z song) =

Single by Jay-Z

from the album American Gangster
- Released: November 4, 2007
- Recorded: 2007
- Genre: Hip-hop
- Label: Roc-A-Fella; Def Jam
- Songwriters: Shawn Carter; Pharrell Williams
- Producer: The Neptunes

Jay-Z singles chronology
| "Roc Boys (And the Winner Is)..." (2007) | "I Know" (2007) | "Roc-A-Fella Billionaires" (2007) |

Music video
- "I Know" on YouTube

"I Know" is a song by the American rapper Jay-Z. Produced by the Neptunes (Pharrell and Chad Hugo), the song was released on November 4, 2007, as the third and final single from Jay-Z's tenth album, American Gangster.

== Music video ==
The music video was leaked to the internet on Yahoo! Music on January 28, 2008. It premiered on Yahoo! on February 26, 2008.

The video (directed by Philip Andelman) features Zoë Kravitz playing multiple roles. The director described it as "a surreal, daydream-like blending of four separate and unrelated stories, four unique trips taken on by four girls in one night in New York City."

Each girl experiences a different "high"—one, a seemingly well-to-do young woman, appears under the influence while in her apartment, another experiences the joy of love, another is taken with the beauty of the night sky in New York City to the confusion of her friends, and finally, the last young woman becomes "high" through music while at a night club.

== Charts ==
=== Weekly charts ===
| Chart (2007–2008) | Peak position |
|---|---|
| US Bubbling Under Hot 100 (Billboard) | 18 |
| US Hot R&B/Hip-Hop Songs (Billboard) | 26 |
| US Hot Rap Songs (Billboard) | 11 |

=== Year-end charts ===
| Chart (2008) | Position |
|---|---|
| US Hot R&B/Hip-Hop Songs (Billboard) | 94 |
