= In My Mind (Pharrell Williams album) =

Studio album by Pharrell Williams
- Released: July 25, 2006
- Genre: Hip-hop; R&B
- Length: 64:20
- Label: Star Trak; Interscope; Virgin
- Producer: Pharrell Williams

Pharrell Williams chronology
In My Mind (2006)	Girl (2014)

Singles from In My Mind
- 1. "Can I Have It Like That" Released: October 10, 2005; 2. "Angel" Released: January 21, 2006; 3. "Number One" Released: August 21, 2006; 4. "That Girl" Released: October 30, 2006

In My Mind is the debut studio album by American musician Pharrell Williams. The album was released on July 25, 2006, by Star Trak Entertainment, Virgin Records and Interscope Records. It debuted at number 3 on the US Billboard 200, selling 142,000 copies in its first week of release. The album is also certified Silver in the United Kingdom for sales of over 60,000 copies. In My Mind would go on to receive a nomination for Best Rap Album at the 49th Annual Grammy Awards.

== Background ==
In June 2003, after having produced and being featured on several songs by other artists, Williams released his debut single "Frontin'", featuring Jay-Z. Despite insisting that the single was a one-off, and that he was purely a producer and not an artist in his own right, it was announced that Williams would release his own studio album.

The album includes the three already-released singles "Can I Have It Like That" (featuring Gwen Stefani), "Angel" (only released in the UK) and "Number One" (featuring Kanye West) and performances featuring Jay-Z, Nelly, Slim Thug, Snoop Dogg, Lauren London, Jamie Cullum and Pusha T of Clipse. Originally the album had been slated for release on November 15, 2005, but the date was delayed at Williams' request. Most recently, a music video for "That Girl" (featuring Snoop Dogg) was released and has been receiving airplay on VH1. On this album, Pharrell makes his solo production debut without his partner Chad Hugo. In an interview on the delay, he stated that he felt the album needed more work. Nearly six months later, it was finally released.

== Critical reception ==
Professional ratings
Aggregate scores
Source	Rating
Metacritic	52/100
Review scores
Source	Rating
AllMusic	3/5 stars
The A.V. Club	B
Entertainment Weekly	C+
The Guardian	3/5 stars
NME	7/10
Pitchfork	3.9/10
PopMatters	4/10
Rolling Stone	2.5/5 stars
Slant Magazine	2/5 stars
Stylus Magazine	D

The album received generally mixed reviews from critics. Christian Hoard of Rolling Stone called it "still only so-so, offering a series of modestly tuneful, sometimes snoozy soul-pop-hip-hop songs". Entertainment Weekly said the album "seems divided against itself, rest assured that all of the songs have something in common: they're not remotely catchy". For AllMusic, Andy Kellman wrote that "it's not like any part of it is flat-out poor, but it's a shame it didn't turn out better". In his consumer guide for MSN Music, Robert Christgau gave the album a two-star honorable mention rating, indicating a "likable effort consumers attuned to its overriding aesthetic or individual vision may well enjoy". He cited "Raspy Shit" and "Number One" as highlights and quipped, "keepin' it playa like he says, for exactly what that's worth".

=== Accolades ===
The album was nominated for Best Rap Album at the 49th Annual Grammy Awards, but lost to Release Therapy by Ludacris.

== Commercial performance ==
In My Mind debuted at number three on the US Billboard 200 behind LeToya's self-titled debut album and the compilation's Now 22, selling 142,000 copies in its first week. The album dropped to the number nine in its second week, selling an additional 51,000 units, for a two-week total of 193,000 copies sold. As of March 2014, In My Mind has sold 406,000 copies in the United States. The album has sold 2,889,025 copies worldwide.

== Track listing ==
All songs written and produced by Pharrell Williams; songs with co-writers are noted.

No.	Title	Writer(s)	Length
1.	"Can I Have It Like That" (featuring Gwen Stefani)		3:55
2.	"How Does It Feel?"		3:36
3.	"Raspy Shit"		3:35
4.	"Best Friend"		4:41
5.	"You Can Do It Too" (featuring Jamie Cullum)		5:22
6.	"Keep It Playa" (featuring Slim Thug)	Stayve Thomas	4:19
7.	"That Girl" (featuring Snoop Dogg and Charlie Wilson)	Calvin Broadus, Jr.	4:01
8.	"Angel"		2:45
9.	"Young Girl"/"I Really Like You" (featuring JAY-Z)	Shawn Carter	8:14
10.	"Take It Off (Dim the Lights)"		4:07
11.	"Stay with Me" (featuring Pusha T)	Terrence Thornton	4:07
12.	"Baby" (featuring Nelly)	Cornell Haynes, Jr.	4:06
13.	"Our Father"		3:27
14.	"Number One" (featuring Kanye West)	Kanye West	3:57
15.	"Skateboard P Presents: Show You How to Hustle" (featuring Lauren)		4:14
16.	"Swagger International" (Japan bonus track)		4:14

== Charts ==
=== Weekly charts ===
Chart (2006)	Peak position
Australian Albums (ARIA)	15
Austrian Albums (Ö3 Austria)	41
Belgian Albums (Ultratop Flanders)	5
Belgian Albums (Ultratop Wallonia)	28
Canadian Albums (Billboard)	8
Danish Albums (Hitlisten)	21
Dutch Albums (Album Top 100)	3
Finnish Albums (Suomen virallinen lista)	27
French Albums (SNEP)	29
German Albums (Offizielle Top 100)	14
Irish Albums (IRMA)	21
Italian Albums (FIMI)	12
Japanese Albums (Oricon)	8
New Zealand Albums (RMNZ)	13
Norwegian Albums (VG-lista)	9
Scottish Albums (Official Charts)	12
Swedish Albums (Sverigetopplistan)	34
Swiss Albums (Schweizer Hitparade)	5
UK Albums (Official Charts)	7
UK R&B Albums (Official Charts)	1
US Billboard 200	3
US Top R&B/Hip-Hop Albums (Billboard)	2

=== Year-end charts ===
Chart (2006)	Position
US Billboard 200	190
US Top R&B/Hip-Hop Albums (Billboard)	51

== Certifications ==
Region	Certification	Certified units/sales
United Kingdom (BPI)	Silver	60,000^{^}
^{^} Shipments figures based on certification alone.
