= Universal Mind Control (song) =

Single by Common

from the album Universal Mind Control
- Released: July 1, 2008
- Recorded: 2008
- Genre: Hip-hop; hip house
- Length: 3:33 (album version); 2:52 (radio edit)
- Label: GOOD; Geffen
- Songwriters: Lonnie Lynn; Pharrell Williams; Charles Hugo
- Producer: The Neptunes

Common singles chronology
"I Want You" (2007)	"Universal Mind Control" (2008)	"Announcement" (2008)

Pharrell singles chronology
"My Drive Thru" (2008)	"Universal Mind Control" (2008)	"Announcement" (2008)

"Universal Mind Control" is the first single released by Common from his 2008 album of the same name. The single features vocals from Pharrell Williams, who co-produced the song with Chad Hugo under their production team The Neptunes. The music video premiered on Common's official YouTube channel on October 6, 2008. In a 2008 Microsoft Zune commercial, Common tells Afrika Bambaataa that, when writing this song, he was influenced by Bambaataa's song "Planet Rock", which the song samples. It is Common's second highest-charting single in the U.S. as it peaked at #62 on the Billboard Hot 100. Common uses an interpolation from Gil Scott-Heron's song "No Knock" at the end of his first verse.

== Music video ==
The music video, directed by Hype Williams, premiered on October 6, 2008 on Common's official YouTube account. The music video features Common in black and white clothes with a metal background. Pharrell, wearing a white Billionaire Boys Club T-shirt, is featured in the video, although his head is replaced with a robot skull. In the beginning and end of the video, a red Zune 80 can be seen. The song was featured in the video game DJ Hero.

An alternate official version of the video leaked on September 30, 2008.

== Chart positions ==
Chart (2008-2009)	Peak position
US Billboard Hot 100	62
US Hot R&B/Hip-Hop Songs (Billboard)	60
US Hot Rap Songs (Billboard)	13
