= American Gangster (album) =

Studio album by Jay-Z
- Released: November 6, 2007
- Studios: Audiovision Studio and South Beach Studios in Miami; SoundTrap Studios in Atlanta; Hot Beats Recording Studios in Atlanta; and Baseline Studios, Daddy's House, KMA Studios, and Rock The Mic in New York
- Genres: East Coast hip-hop; mafioso rap
- Length: 58:38
- Labels: Roc-A-Fella; Island Def Jam
- Producers: Sean "Diddy" Combs with The Hitmen; Bigg D; Chris Flame; Danja; Idris "Driis" Elba; Jermaine Dupri; Just Blaze; The Neptunes; No I.D.; Swizz Beatz; Timbaland; Toomp; Mario Winans

Jay-Z chronology
Kingdom Come (2006)	American Gangster (2007)	The Blueprint 3 (2009)

Singles from American Gangster
- 1. "Blue Magic" Released: September 20, 2007; 2. "Roc Boys (And the Winner Is)..." Released: October 10, 2007; 3. "I Know" Released: November 4, 2007

American Gangster is the tenth studio album by American rapper Jay-Z. It was conceived as a concept album—inspired by the 2007 film of the same name—and was released on November 6 of that year through Roc-A-Fella Records. The album features production from Diddy & the Hitmen, Timbaland, Swizz Beatz, Just Blaze, Danja and the Neptunes, among others. It also includes guest appearances by Beanie Sigel, Lil Wayne, Pharrell, and Nas. The album's production is built around 1970s soul and funk, with instruments featured on the album played by professional musicians including, horns, string arrangements, drummers, and unconventional percussion created with bottles. The album's theme is based around the gangster lifestyle, the American Dream, and Jay-Z's memories of growing up in Brooklyn, New York's Marcy.

American Gangster received widespread critical acclaim and was viewed by music critics as a return to form for Jay-Z following the critical disappointment of Kingdom Come (2006). It was ranked among the best albums of 2007 in several publications' year-end lists, including The Austin Chronicle, who ranked it number one. Rolling Stone also named the album's second single, "Roc Boys (And the Winner Is)...", the best song of 2007.

The album was also a commercial success, debuting at number one on the US Billboard 200, selling over 425,000 copies in its first week. This became Jay-Z's tenth number-one album, tying him with Elvis Presley for the second most number-one albums on the chart. A month after its release, it was certified platinum by the Recording Industry Association of America (RIAA) in December 2007. This would be Jay-Z's last album released under Def Jam Recordings before signing with Live Nation two years later.

== Recording and production ==
American Gangster was recorded in sessions at Audiovision Studio and South Beach Studios in Miami; SoundTrap Studios in Atlanta; Hot Beats Recording Studios in Atlanta; and Baseline Studios, Daddy's House, KMA Studios, and Rock The Mic in New York. Jay-Z would have the film American Gangster playing on the monitors above the recording booth as a source of motivation during the recording sessions. In an interview with MTV, producer LV from the Hitmen said, "Jay would have the beats...He'd do the record, and he'd send it back to us. We'd fill in the blanks as far as making them full records. From having live horns, live strings, live drummers. This percussion dude, he was coming in with bottles, banging on bottles, just sprinkles of shit. We went all out. We brought in musicians to bring it out. Jay probably just heard a sample and some drums. Once we got the vocals back, we brought in all the extra candy".

The Neptunes provided production twice on the album, with the first single "Blue Magic", which is the fourteenth track, and the eighth track "I Know". Diddy and two of his producers known as LV & Sean C, who are from his production team, the Hitmen, are responsible for six tracks on the album. They are credited with the second single, "Roc Boys (And the Winner Is)...", "American Dreamin'" (where his other production partner Mario Winans assists), "No Hook", "Party Life", "Pray", and "Sweet". DJ Toomp delivers one track for the album, while Just Blaze is credited for a bonus track and the re-make of "Ignorant Shit". Kanye West mentor No I.D. gives two tracks also, one which he co-produces with Jermaine Dupri and vice versa. Finally, three lesser known producers lend hand to the "Intro", which is credited to Chris Flames and co-production from Idris "Driis" Elba, while Bigg D produces the Beastie Boys–sampling Lil Wayne assisted track "Hello Brooklyn 2.0".

Jay-Z originally stated he recorded nine tracks for the album, but the final track listing accumulated 15 overall cuts (including two bonus tracks). Def Jam executive Tracey Waples noted each track from the album would have its own "mini-film". The album cover and music videos were costume designed by June Ambrose.

== Music and lyrics ==
According to Yahoo! Music journalist Angus Batey, American Gangster used "a selection of beats built from '70s soul and funk" to reflects "the period setting; lyrically, its primary theme is an investigation of the evolution of the gangsta archetype, looking at how the drug dealer became a semi-sympathetic outlaw figure, examining the contradictions inherent in those who chase the American Dream on the far side of legality, and ruminating on what this period of US history might yet come to mean". Jay-Z stated that almost every song is based on a specific scene from the film. In an interview on the Charlie Rose Show, he elucidated the inspiration behind the album:

It's a New York City true story, you know. So as soon as the movie came on, it was like familiar, things that my pop seen and my uncles seen and, you know, different things like that, things I've seen growing up. So they resonated with me in a way, the story, as well as, I mean, even though everything happens, you know, the way it turns out, you know, it's one of those movies that where you champion the bad guy, because the bad guy, you know, he don't seem like a bad guy, and the good guy — I mean the good guys are bad. You know, that complex — the complexity of human beings in this thing was amazing to me. I loved the complexity of the human beings.

Although Jay-Z says American Gangster was inspired by the movie, songs such as "Say Hello" touch on the topics of censorship and the Jena 6 controversy. Jay-Z also drew on personal memories he had not touched on in a while, specifically memories from his early life when he lived in Brooklyn, New York City, New York's Marcy.

== Release and promotion ==
American Gangster was made available for digital download in its entirety, at Amazon.com, Roc-A-Fella's website, and Rhapsody on November 6, 2007. Jay-Z had the album removed from the iTunes Store, explaining that "as movies are not sold scene by scene, this collection will not be sold as individual singles." It was eventually released to iTunes in 2011.

Jay-Z promoted the album with the American Gangster Live concert tour, performing material only from the album in five smaller sized venues across the US, starting on November 6 in Los Angeles and ending on November 12 in Philadelphia. According to a statement from Roc-A-Fella.com, the five-city club tour sold out in less than 60 seconds.

== Critical reception ==
Professional ratings
Aggregate scores
Source	Rating
Metacritic	83/100
Review scores
Source	Rating
AllMusic	4/5 stars
The A.V. Club	A−
Entertainment Weekly	B+
The Irish Times	4/5 stars
NME	2.5/5 stars
Pitchfork	8.6/10
Q	4/5 stars
Rolling Stone	4/5 stars
Uncut	4/5 stars
USA Today	3.5/4 stars

According to the review aggregator Metacritic, American Gangster received "universal acclaim" based on a weighted average score of 83 out of 100 from 25 critic scores.

Reviewing the album for Rolling Stone, Rob Sheffield deemed it a vast improvement over Jay-Z's previous record, Kingdom Come, adding that the rapper "sounds relaxed, no longer worried about impressing anyone." In Entertainment Weekly, Neil Drumming said it was more than "a throwback album" and that Jay-Z adjusts his flow to each production while "emerging cockier than ever on the next track". Village Voice critic Amy Linden praised its live instrumentation, finding it lush, sexy, and "tailor-made for the '70s theme ... without being shamelessly retro". According to The Observer's Steve Yates, "it's Jay-Z's and American Gangster's triumph that reflecting on his appetite seems to have reawakened it". Nathan Rabin from The A.V. Club called the record a "surprisingly strong return to form", while Hot Press journalist Chris Wasser found its songs smooth and clever, "intelligent numbers that, instead of bombarding us with stale rhyming schemes and plastic beats, groove ever so effectively." Greg Kot was impressed by the complexity of Jay-Z's metaphors about drug trafficking, making music, and relationships; he wrote in the Chicago Tribune that the rapper offers the kind of multidimensional lyrics that characterize classic hip-hop.

Some reviewers expressed reservations. Kelefa Sanneh wrote in The New York Times that Jay-Z's reluctance to indulge in the gangsta rap lyricism of his past resulted in wavering, equivocal songs such as "No Hook" and "Say Hello". "Once, words just seemed to flow out of him, as if he couldn't help himself", Sanneh said. "Now it's clearer than ever that he's choosing them carefully." Louis Pattison of NME was more critical and called it a regression from the "slightly bloated" Kingdom Come, lamenting the shortage of "don't-give-a-fuck attitude" highlighted on "Success" in favor of less effective raps exploiting Jay-Z's entrepreneurial personage. In MSN Music, Robert Christgau cited "Say Hello" and "Blue Magic" as highlights while humorously using sampled film dialogue from the latter track to frame his lukewarm opinion of the album: "Jay-Z, that's a brand name, like Pepsi, that's a brand name – he stands behind it, he guarantees it, even if you don't know him any more than you know the chairman of Universal Music". He later assigned it a one-star honorable mention.

American Gangster was ranked in the top ten of several music publications' end-of-year lists, including The Austin Chronicle (number one), Spin (number eight), and Rolling Stone magazine (number three). Rolling Stone also named the album's second single, "Roc Boys (And the Winner Is)...", the best single of 2007. In The Village Voice's annual Pazz & Jop critics poll, American Gangster finished 18th in the best albums voting. In an interview with Jeff Johnson of cable network BET, President Barack Obama said he was a fan of the album.

== Commercial performance ==
American Gangster debuted at number one in the US Billboard 200 chart, selling 425,000 copies in its first week, according to Nielsen Soundscan. This became Jay-Z's tenth US number one album, tying him with Elvis Presley at second most number-one albums in the US with the record is being held by The Beatles. In its second week, the album dropped to number eight on the chart, selling an additional 131,000 copies. In its third week, the album sold 86,500 copies, and by that point had sold 683,000 copies overall. On December 6, 2007, the album was certified platinum by the Recording Industry Association of America (RIAA) for shipments of over one million copies. As of August 2009, the album has sold 1,131,000 copies in the United States.

== Track listing ==
American Gangster track listing
No.	Title	Writer(s)	Producer(s)	Length
1.	"Intro" (performed by Idris Elba)	Idris "Driis" Elba; Angel Wood	Elba; Chris Flame^{[a]}	2:00
2.	"Pray"	Shawn Carter; Sean Combs; Deleno Matthews; Levar Coppin; Alan Hawkshaw	Diddy; Sean C; LV	4:24
3.	"American Dreamin'"	Carter; Combs; Matthews; Coppin; Marvin Gaye; Arthur Ross; Leon Ware	Diddy; Sean C; LV; Mario Winans^{[a]}	4:47
4.	"Hello Brooklyn 2.0" (featuring Lil Wayne)	Carter; Dwayne Carter; Derrick Baker	Bigg D	3:55
5.	"No Hook"	S. Carter; Combs; Matthews; Coppin; Barry White	Diddy; Sean C; LV	3:13
6.	"Roc Boys (And the Winner Is)..."	S. Carter; Combs; Matthews; Coppin; Thomas Brenneck; Dave Guy; Mike Deller; Leon Michels; Bosco Mann	Diddy; Sean C; LV	4:12
7.	"Sweet"	S. Carter; Combs; Matthews; Coppin; Rudy Love	Diddy; Sean C; LV	3:26
8.	"I Know"	S. Carter; Pharrell Williams	The Neptunes	3:42
9.	"Party Life"	S. Carter; Combs; Matthews; Coppin; Willie Hale; David Stone	Diddy; Sean C; LV	4:29
10.	"Ignorant Shit" (featuring Beanie Sigel)	S. Carter; Justin Smith; Dwight Grant; Rudolph Isley; O'Kelly Isley; Ronald Isley; Marvin Isley; Ernie Isley; Chris Jasper	Just Blaze	3:41
11.	"Say Hello"	S. Carter; Aldrin Davis; Tom Brocker	Toomp	5:26
12.	"Success" (featuring Nas)	S. Carter; Ernest Wilson; Nasir Jones; Larry Ellis	No I.D.; Jermaine Dupri^{[a]}	3:30
13.	"Fallin'"	S. Carter; Jermaine Dupri; Tony Hester	Dupri; No I.D.^{[a]}	4:06
14.	"Blue Magic" (bonus track)	S. Carter; Williams; Denzil Foster; Thomas McElroy; Terry Ellis; Cindy Herron; Maxine Jones; Dawn Robinson; Bernhard Kaun	The Neptunes	4:10
15.	"American Gangster" (bonus track)	S. Carter; Smith; Curtis Mayfield	Just Blaze	3:40
Total length:				58:38

=== Notes ===
- ^{^[a]} signifies a co-producer
- "I Know" and "Blue Magic" features additional vocals by Pharrell Williams.
- "Roc Boys (And the Winner Is)..." features additional vocals by Beyoncé, Kanye West and Cassie.
- "Fallin'" features additional vocals by Bilal

=== Sample credits ===
- "Roc Boys (And the Winner Is)..." samples "Make the Road by Walking" by Menahan Street Band.

== Personnel ==
#	Title	Notes
1	"Intro"	Arrangers: Hector Delgado & Idris Elba; Guitar: Marty Reid; Additional strings: Timon Abuptah; Additional vocals: Angel Wood; Dialogue from the 2007 biographical crime film American Gangster, dialogue excerpts spoken by Denzel Washington
2	"Pray"	Songwriters: S. Carter, S. Combs, D. Matthews, L. Coppin, and A. Hawkshaw; Sample: "New Earth" by Hank Marvin; Strings & drums: Mario Winans; Bass clarinet & bass trombone: Aaron J. Johnson; Bass & guitar: James Lewis; Vocals: Adonis Shropshire, Carmen Cameron, Cheri Dennis, Leisa Johnson, Shannon Jones, Jayms Madison & A.J. Walker; Additional vocals: Beyoncé Knowles (uncredited)
3	"American Dreamin"	Songwriters: S. Carter, S. Combs, D. Matthews, L. Coppin, M. Gaye, A. Ross, L. Ware; Samples: "Soon I'll Be Loving You Again" by Marvin Gaye; Bass, piano & strings: Arden "Keys" Altino; Live drums & strings: Mario Winans; Background vocals: Keon Bryce Jack Knight
4	"Hello Brooklyn 2.0"	Songwriters: S. Carter, D. Carter, D. Baker; Sample: "B-Boy Bouillabaisse" (Section 5, "Hello Brooklyn") by the Beastie Boys; All instruments: Bigg D
5	"No Hook"	Songwriters: S. Carter, S. Combs, D. Matthews, L. Coppin, B. White; Sample: "Love Serenade" by Barry White; Percussion: Bashiri Johnson; Bass & guitar: Ed "Wolverine" Goldson; Strings & drums: Mario Winans; Keyboards, strings, Rhodes & piano: Arden "Keyz" Altino; Vocals: Jayms Madison
6	"Roc Boys (And the Winner Is)..."	Songwriters: S. Carter, S. Combs, D. Matthews, L. Coppin, T. Brenneck, D. Guy, M. Deller, L. Michels, B. Mann; Sample: "Make the Road by Walking" by Menahan Street Band; Arrangement & tenor saxophone: Kenneth Whalum; Trumpet: Keyon Harrold & Cameron Johnson; Trombone: Saunders Sermon; Bass & guitar: Ed "Wolverine" Goldson; Percussion: Bashiri Johnson; Drums: Mario Winans; Addition vocals: Beyoncé Knowles, Cassie & Kanye West
7	"Sweet"	Songwriters: S. Carter, S. Combs, D. Matthews, L. Coppin, R. Love; Sample: "Does Your Mama Know" by Rudy Love & The Love Family; Bass & guitar: Ed "Wolverine" Goldson; Percussion: Bashiri Johnson; Additional vocals: Cassie, Carmen Cameron & A.J. Walker
8	"I Know"	Songwriters: S. Carter, P. Williams; Additional vocals: Pharrell Williams
9	"Party Life"	Songwriters: S. Carter, S. Combs, D. Matthews, L. Coppin, W. Hale, D. Stone; Sample: "Get into the Party Life" by Little Beaver; Bass & guitar: Ed "Wolverine" Goldson; Percussion: Bashiri Johnson; Drums: Mario Winans; Trumpet: Keyon Harrold; Additional vocals: Shannon Jones
10	"Ignorant Shit"	Songwriters: S. Carter, J. Smith, D. Grant, R. Isley, O. Isley, R. Isley, M. Isley, E. Isley, C. Jasper; Sample: "Between the Sheets" by The Isley Brothers
11	"Say Hello"	Songwriters: S. Carter, A. Davis, T. Brocker; Sample: "The Love We Share Is The Greatest Of Them All" by Tom Brock; Production coordination: Keke & Amy; Background vocals: Rhonda Robinson
12	"Success"	Songwriters: S. Carter, E. Wilson, N. Jones, L. Ellis; Sample: "Funky Thing (Part 1)" by Larry Ellis & The Black Hammer; Background vocals: Juan "OG" Perez; Interpolation: I'm Back By Eminem from the album The Marshall Mathers LP; Dialogue from the 2007 biographical crime film American Gangster, dialogue excerpts spoken by Armand Assante
13	"Fallin'"	Songwriters: S. Carter, J. Dupri, T. Hester; Sample: "Fell for You" by The Dramatics; Background vocals: Bilal
14	"Blue Magic"	Songwriters: S. Carter, P. Williams, D. Foster, T. McElroy, T. Ellis, C. Herron, M. Jones, D. Robinson and B. Kaun; Sample: "Hold On" by En Vogue; Sample: "Main Title/Neighbor Burial" by Bernhard Kaun; Additional vocals: Pharrell Williams; Dialogue from the 2007 biographical crime film American Gangster, dialogue excerpts spoken by Denzel Washington; Dialogue from the 1931 horror film Frankenstein Directed by James Whale
15	"American Gangster"	Songwriters: S. Carter, J. Smith, C. Mayfield; Sample: "Short Eyes" by Curtis Mayfield; Live drums: Stillphil; Additional piano: Canei Finch; Alto saxophone: Andy Snitzer; Tenor saxophone: Charles Pillow; Trombone: Mike David; Trumpet: Jeff Kievet; Violins: Sandra Park, Sharon Yamada, Sarah Boyle, Jeanine Wynton, Lisa Kim, Minyoung Chang, Matt Lehmann, Liz Lim; Violas: Dawn Hannay & Sue Pray; Cellos: Eileen Moon & Jeanne LeBlanc; Strings contractor: Sandra Park

== Charts ==
=== Weekly charts ===
Chart (2007)	Peak position
Belgian Albums (Ultratop Flanders)	88
Canadian Albums (Billboard)	3
Dutch Albums (Album Top 100)	64
French Albums (SNEP)	58
German Albums (Offizielle Top 100)	99
Irish Albums (IRMA)	59
Norwegian Albums (VG-lista)	29
Scottish Albums (Official Charts)	36
Swiss Albums (Schweizer Hitparade)	17
UK Albums (Official Charts)	30
US Billboard 200	1
US Top R&B/Hip-Hop Albums (Billboard)	1
US Top Rap Albums (Billboard)	1

=== Year-end charts ===
Chart (2007)	Position
US Billboard 200	115
US Top R&B/Hip-Hop Albums (Billboard)	28

Chart (2008)	Position
US Billboard 200	57
US Top R&B/Hip-Hop Albums (Billboard)	10

== Certifications ==
Region	Certification	Certified units/sales
Canada (Music Canada)	Gold	50,000^{^}
United Kingdom (BPI)	Silver	60,000^{^}
United States (RIAA)	Platinum	1,000,000^{^}
^{^} Shipments figures based on certification alone.

== See also ==
- List of number-one albums of 2007 (U.S.)
- List of number-one R&B albums of 2007 (U.S.)
