= Can I Have It Like That =

2005 single by Pharrell Williams

Single by Pharrell featuring Gwen Stefani

from the album In My Mind
- Released: October 10, 2005
- Recorded: 2005
- Genre: Hip-hop; funk; R&B
- Length: 3:55
- Label: Star Trak; Interscope; Virgin
- Songwriter: Pharrell Williams
- Producer: Pharrell Williams

Pharrell singles chronology
"Wanna Love You Girl" (2005)	"Can I Have It Like That" (2005)	"I Ain't Heard of That" (2005)

Gwen Stefani singles chronology
"Cool" (2005)	"Can I Have It Like That" (2005)	"Luxurious" (2005)

Music video
- "Can I Have It Like That" on YouTube

"Can I Have It Like That" is a song written, produced, and performed by American musician Pharrell Williams featuring vocals from American singer Gwen Stefani. From the former's 2006 debut album In My Mind, it is the opening track. The song's hook comes from a one-line contribution from Stefani, used as part of a call and response in the chorus. "Can I Have It Like That" was released as the album's lead single October 10, 2005.

The song was mildly successful in the United States, but fared somewhat better worldwide. A rock remix of the song featured Travis Barker playing the drums and Williams playing the guitar. It was later included as one of the songs in NBA 2K15.

== Background and composition ==
P. Diddy was originally designated to use the track that Williams created. Several other artists were also interested in using it, but Williams changed his mind and decided to use the song himself. In mid-2005, he worked with Stefani in Miami, Florida on her second solo album The Sweet Escape (2006). While she was in the booth recording "Breakin' Up", he told her that he had a song he thought would be his first single. Stefani asked to hear it, and he said that he wanted to record her for the track after the two finished working on "Breakin' Up". Stefani, however, insisted that they work on "Can I Have It Like That" then, and Williams recorded her performing the song's hook. She contributed one line, which she performed twice, to the song.

"Can I Have It Like That"
Most of the song uses an irregular drum loop and prominent bass.

Williams' rap is in a throaty baritone, described as a "honey-coated version" of the styles of Snoop Dogg and Dr. Dre. He raps about his current lifestyle as well as his life and achievements. The rap is set over a rhythm section consisting of an irregular beat and a grinding bass. The track reflects Williams' minimalist style, and it is inflected with jazz music, including a trumpet part during the bridge.

== Critical reception ==
Josh Tyrangiel of Entertainment Weekly called the song an "odd opener" to In My Mind and remarked that Williams "never commits to putting his hips into it", leaving the track without any climax. The Observer's Luke Bainbridge, however, referred to the song as "a grinding instant smash". For IGN, Spence Abbott described Williams' rapping as "a little sticky, but…ruggedly appealing in a manner of speaking", and commented that "it's the shuffling and infectious beat…that will have you swerving and slinking like a cobra with epilepsy." In his review for Slant Magazine, Preston Jones characterized the song as "curiously inert", adding that it sounded better as a sample on Girl Talk's 2006 mashup album Night Ripper. About.com's Ivan Rott commented that the song's funk-influenced sound "definitely knocks", but was disappointed in Stefani's contribution, finding its repetition tedious. Evan McGarvey of Stylus Magazine also found it repetitive, and described "Can I Have It Like That" as "a brief distillation of everything calamitous about [Williams'] and Chad Hugo's production style". The Guardian stated that Stefani's part was the only catchy hook on In My Mind, but added that it "seems to be built around a one-line cast-off found on the Love. Angel. Music. Baby. factory floor." Finding "Can I Have It Like That" a "slow burner" that offered a "promising hint at what else is to come" on In My Mind, Claire Simpson stated in her musicOMH review that Stefani's contribution was "purely cosmetic and clearly a transparent means of getting her name on the single to not only boost her own credentials but to help draw Pharrell to the attention of her increasingly mainstream following."

== Chart performance ==
"Can I Have It Like That" was commercially unsuccessful in the United States. It debuted at number 97 on the Billboard Hot 100 and peaked at number 49 three weeks later. It exited the chart after eight weeks. It was somewhat more successful in urban contemporary and rhythmic contemporary markets, reaching number 20 on the Hot Rap Tracks, number 31 on the Rhythmic Top 40, and number 32 on the Hot R&B/Hip-Hop Songs. It had some crossover success in mainstream music and reached number 51 on the Billboard Pop 100.

The single was more successful in Europe, where it reached number 11 on the Billboard European Hot 100 Singles chart. In the United Kingdom, "Can I Have It Like That" debuted and peaked at number three on the UK Singles Chart, behind Arctic Monkeys' "I Bet You Look Good on the Dancefloor" and Westlife's cover of You Raise Me Up. It left the chart after 11 weeks. The single remained Williams' highest-charting release in Britain until 2013 when he topped the charts three times with Robin Thicke's "Blurred Lines", Daft Punk's "Get Lucky", and as the solo artist in "Happy". The song was less successful throughout the rest of Europe and reached the top 20 in Finland, Ireland, and Norway; the top 40 in Belgium, Germany, the Netherlands, and Switzerland; and the top 80 in Austria and France.

"Can I Have It Like That" was somewhat successful elsewhere. It debuted at number 21 on the ARIA Singles Chart and after gradually descending the chart, reached a second peak at number 31 seven weeks later. It remained on the chart for a total of 12 weeks. After debuting at number 20, the song peaked at number 18 on the New Zealand Singles Chart.

== Music video ==
Stefani and Williams performing in front of a sort of equalizer.

The song's music video was directed by Paul Hunter. It depicts Williams being watched by a secret organization. Aware that he is being watched, he talks to a woman, revealed to be Stefani, on the phone. He makes appearances at an exclusive boat party and at another party in his penthouse. There are intercut sequences of people including Williams and Stefani dancing in front of a large equalizer, Williams standing in front of explosions, and people skateboarding. And the video also shows Pharrell's Enzo Ferrari.

The music video was filmed in late September 2005. The cinematography is designed so that the music video becomes the secret organization's surveillance of Williams. It uses shifting camera angles to create tension. The scenes in front of the equalizer were filmed in front of a greenscreen, and the explosion sequences were shot live on the streets of Los Angeles, California. In the penthouse scene, he is accompanied by two naked women with leopard-pattern body paint and a baby cougar. Hunter came up with the idea of showing body-painted women, and Williams suggested sitting with the cougar because he "wanted to exude power."

The video had little success on video chart programs. To date, it is Williams' only video as a main artist to debut on MTV's Total Request Live. It was on the program's countdown for three days, reaching number nine. The video was unable to make MuchMusic's Countdown.

== Track listings ==
12-inch vinyl single

1. "Can I Have It Like That" (clean) – 3:57
2. "Can I Have It Like That" (dirty) – 3:57
3. "Can I Have It Like That" (instrumental) – 3:57
4. "Can I Have It Like That" (acappella) – 3:49

American 7-inch vinyl single

1. "Can I Have It Like That" (clean) – 3:57
2. "Can I Have It Like That" (dirty) – 3:57

British CD single

1. "Can I Have It Like That" – 3:59
2. "Can I Have It Like That" (the Travis Barker remix) – 4:10

== Charts ==
=== Weekly charts ===
Weekly chart performance for "Can I Have It Like That"
Chart (2005–2006)	Peak position
Australia (ARIA)	21
Australian Urban (ARIA)	7
Austria (Ö3 Austria Top 40)	47
Belgium (Ultratop 50 Flanders)	32
Belgium (Ultratop 50 Wallonia)	35
Canada (Nielsen SoundScan)	29
Denmark (Tracklisten)	8
Finland (Suomen virallinen lista)	10
France (SNEP)	78
Germany (GfK)	37
Greece (IFPI)	22
Ireland (IRMA)	12
Italy (FIMI)	16
Netherlands (Dutch Top 40)	25
Netherlands (Single Top 100)	15
New Zealand (Recorded Music NZ)	18
Norway (VG-lista)	15
Scotland Singles (OCC)	4
Sweden (Sverigetopplistan)	60
Switzerland (Schweizer Hitparade)	28
UK Singles (OCC)	3
UK Hip Hop/R&B (OCC)	1
US Billboard Hot 100	49
US Hot R&B/Hip-Hop Songs (Billboard)	32
US Hot Rap Songs (Billboard)	20
US Rhythmic Airplay (Billboard)	31

=== Year-end charts ===
Year-end chart performance for "Can I Have It Like That"
Chart (2005)	Position
UK Urban (Music Week)	24

== Sales ==
Sales for "Can I Have It Like That"
Region	Certification	Certified units/sales
United Kingdom	—	126,000

== Release history ==
Release dates and formats for "Can I Have It Like That"
Region	Date	Format(s)	Label(s)	Ref.
United States	October 10, 2005	Rhythmic contemporary radio	Star Trak Entertainment; Interscope	
United Kingdom	October 31, 2005	CD	Star Trak Entertainment; Virgin	
Australia	November 14, 2005	CD	Star Trak Entertainment; Virgin	
