= Blue Magic (song) =

Single by Jay-Z

from the album American Gangster
- Released: September 20, 2007
- Recorded: 2007
- Genre: Hip-hop
- Length: 4:10
- Label: Roc-A-Fella; Def Jam
- Songwriters: Shawn Carter; Pharrell Williams; Bernard Kaun; Denzil Foster; Thomas McElroy; Terry Ellis; Cindy Herron; Maxine Jones; Dawn Robinson
- Producer: The Neptunes

Jay-Z singles chronology
| "Umbrella" (2007) | "Blue Magic" (2007) | "Roc Boys (And the Winner Is)..." (2007) |

Music video
- "Blue Magic" on YouTube

"Blue Magic" is the first single from American rapper Jay-Z's tenth album, American Gangster. The song was released as a single on September 20, 2007. In the chorus, American musician Pharrell sings an interpretation of "Hold On" by the R&B girl group En Vogue, who are also featured in the song. The name "Blue Magic" is a reference to a potent form of heroin sold by Frank Lucas at the height of his drug trade in Harlem, New York. An official remix features Pharrell and American singer Trey Songz.

== Music video ==
The music video was directed by Hype Williams with costumes designed by June Ambrose. It was first shown on BET's 106 & Park on October 11, 2007. The video shows the recording artist and dancer Teyana Taylor, dancing and popping throughout the video. The video appeared at the bottom of BET's Notarized: Top 100 Videos of 2007 on December 31, 2007. The video was noted for prominently featuring wads and a suitcase full of 500 Euro notes, and it was noted that the video gave the euro media attention at a time when the U.S. dollar had sharply lost in value against most major world currencies such as the euro, pound Sterling and Canadian dollar.

== Charts ==
| Chart (2007–2008) | Peak position |
|---|---|
| Canada Hot 100 (Billboard) | 69 |
| Lithuania (EHR) | 6 |
| US Billboard Hot 100 | 55 |
| US Hot R&B/Hip-Hop Songs (Billboard) | 31 |
| US Hot Rap Songs (Billboard) | 17 |
| US Pop 100 (Billboard) | 52 |
