= Twista =

American rapper (born 1973)

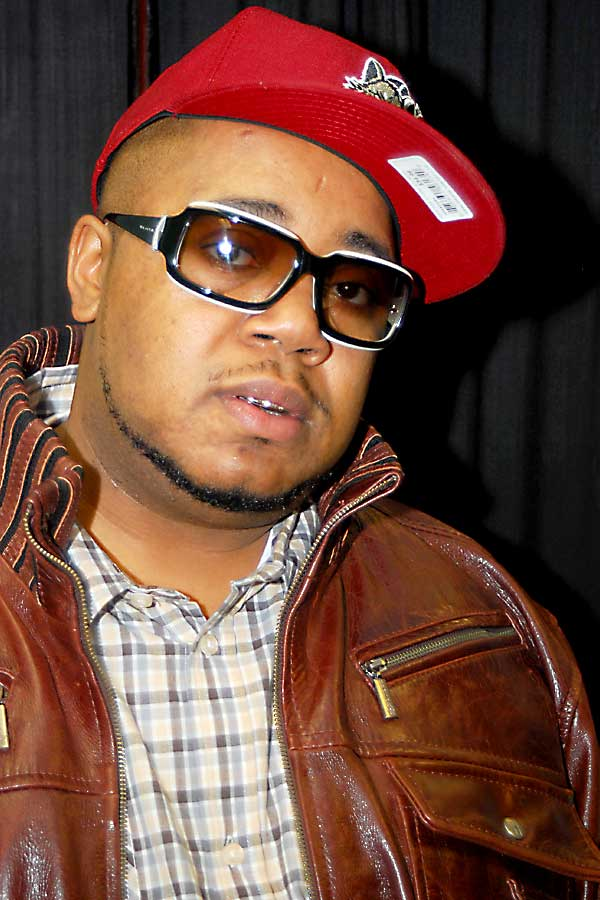
- Twista in 2010

Background information
- Also known as: Tung Twista
- Born: Carl Terrell Mitchell; November 27, 1973 (age 52); Chicago, Illinois, U.S.
- Genres: Hip-hop; chopper; gangsta rap
- Occupations: Rapper; songwriter; record producer
- Years active: 1991–present
- Labels: Get Money Gang; Capitol; EMI; Big Beat; Atlantic; Loud; Zoo; BMG
- Producer(s): The Legendary Traxster

Carl Terrell Mitchell (born November 27, 1973), better known by his stage name Twista (originally Tung Twista), is an American rapper. He is best known for his chopper style of rapping and for once holding the title of fastest English-speaking rapper in the world according to Guinness World Records in 1992, being able to pronounce 598 syllables in 55 seconds.

In 1997, after appearing on Do or Die's hit single "Po Pimp", produced by the Legendary Traxster, Twista signed with Big Beat and Atlantic Records, where he released his third album Adrenaline Rush and formed the group Speedknot Mobstaz, in 1998. His 2004 album Kamikaze topped the U.S. Billboard 200, after the success of the Billboard Hot 100 number-one single "Slow Jamz", featuring Kanye West and Jamie Foxx.

== Early life ==
Carl Terrell Mitchell was born on November 27, 1973, and grew up in the K-Town area of the West Garfield Park neighborhood on the West Side of Chicago, Illinois, and began rapping at the age of 12. However, before starting his professional career, he worked at several other jobs including working at a factory, selling shoes, working at McDonald's, working as a security guard, and even cutting hair.

== Career ==
Mitchell released his debut single "Mr. Tung Twista" in 1991. In 1992, he released his first album, Runnin' Off at da Mouth, as Tung Twista.

His second album, Resurrection, was set to be released in 1994, but due to problems with his record label at the time Atlantic Records and marketing issues involving fellow Chicago rapper Common's album of the same name, the album was only released in the city of Chicago and thus got little national attention.

In 1996, he teamed with Chicago producer the Legendary Traxster and Creator's Way / CWAL artists Do or Die on the track "Po Pimp" produced by the Legendary Traxster, which became a hit single. This led to a CWAL's label deal with Atlantic Records, which released Adrenaline Rush in 1997. Twista had by then dropped the "Tung" from his stage name. Adrenaline Rush became Twista's first charting album, as it peaked at #77 on the Billboard 200. The album also spawned a Billboard Hot 100 hit in "Get It Wet" produced by the Legendary Traxster, which peaked at #96.

In 1998, Twista teamed with other Chicago area rappers to form Speedknot Mobstaz. They released their first album, Mobstability, produced entirely by the Legendary Traxster, in 1998. Twista then joined label Legit Ballin', which released two compilation albums: Legit Ballin' in 1999 and Legit Ballin' Vol. 2: Street Scriptures in 2001. The label later released Respect the Game, Vol. 3 in 2002 and Volume 4: Tha Truth in 2006. In 2000, Twista collaborated with Ruff Ryders and Drag-On on the album Ryde or Die Vol. 2, on the track "Twisted Heat". He also collaborated with Memphis Bleek on "Is That Your Chick (The Lost Verses)" on the album The Understanding.

Beginning in 2002, Twista began recording his album Kamikaze with rappers like Kanye West and Ludacris. Kamikaze was released in 2004 and debuted at the top spot of the US Billboard 200 album chart. Its first single "Slow Jamz" (also featured on West's debut album The College Dropout), featured West and Jamie Foxx and became a number-one hit in the US. Other singles included "Overnight Celebrity" and "So Sexy" (featuring R. Kelly); the album sold around two million copies. The remix of the song "Jook Gal" by Elephant Man featured Twista and the YoungBloodZ. Kamikaze and its singles gave Twista a new level of success and rose his profile significantly within the rap community.

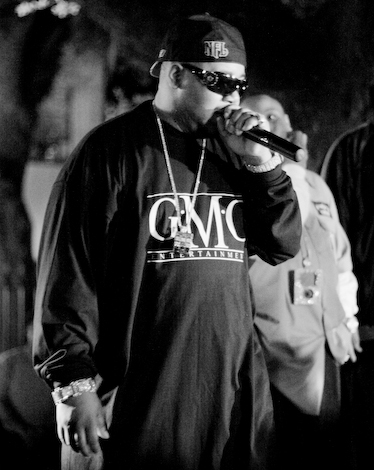
Twista in 2008

Twista's album The Day After was released in 2005. It featured the hit singles "Girl Tonite" (featuring Trey Songz), "Hit the Floor" (featuring Pitbull), and "So Lonely" (featuring Mariah Carey). His next album, Adrenaline Rush 2007, was released in 2007. Also in 2007, Pitbull released the song "Candyman" featuring Twista off the album The Boatlift. Its singles were "Give It Up" (featuring Pharrell) and "Creep Fast" (featuring T-Pain). This album sold poorly compared to Twista's earlier albums. Twista appeared on the single "Hell No (Leave Home)" from Monica's 2006 album The Makings of Me. In 2008, Twista launched a new record label called Get Money Gang Entertainment and the album Category F5 with the hit, "Wetter". In 2009, Twista appeared on the single "Legendary" with fellow Chicago rappers AK-47 of Do or Die and Saurus and Bones.

Twista released his eighth solo album, The Perfect Storm on November 9, 2010. The first single from the album, "Make a Movie" produced by the Legendary Traxster, featuring Chris Brown, was released on August 24, 2010. Two buzz singles were released, "I Do" produced by Traxster and "Heat" produced by fellow Chicago producers No I.D. and the Legendary Traxster. The album features artists such as Waka Flocka Flame, Raekwon, Tia London, Sean "Diddy" Combs, Ray J, and others. Production on the album is mainly by the Legendary Traxster along with Streetrunner, the Kray Twinz, Tight Mike, and No I.D., Twista discussed his new documentary, directed by Vlad Yudin and the making of The Perfect Storm, including his belief that artists need to do more than just record songs and that they need to become more involved with the community around them.

A documentary film, Mr. Immortality: The Life and Times of Twista, was released in November 2010.

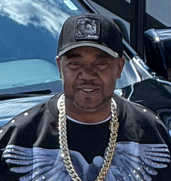
Twista in 2025

In January 2013, Twista was featured in a remix of Lil Reese's song "Traffic". As of 2013, Twista was working on his ninth studio album, Dark Horse. He also was rumored to be in the works of signing a record deal with Kanye West's record label GOOD Music, although in an interview with HipHopDX, Twista denied the rumor. The first single was "Throwin' My Money" (featuring R. Kelly) and produced by Chris Millionaire. Twista appeared on the song "Jewels n' Drugs" by Lady Gaga on the album Artpop. "It's Yours" (featuring Tia London) was released on May 6, 2014, as the second single of the aforementioned album. It was serviced to urban contemporary radio in the US on May 27, 2014, by Capitol Records. Dark Horse was released on August 12, 2014.

Twista is featured on the song "Gossip" from When Music Worlds Collide released in May 2015. Twista released his mixtape Summer 96 in 2019. It includes the song "Home Invasion" which features "Do or Die" and was produced by Hearon Tracks.

Twista appeared on the TV game show To Tell the Truth (on ABC) in 2017. In 2019, he appeared as a judge on the rap competition series Rhythm + Flow on Netflix.

== Personal life ==
Twista was married from 1991 to 1999 and had a daughter with his ex-wife.

During the holiday season in 2010, Twista and his team Get Money Gang worked together with Chicago Food Bank's Producemobile program to feed hungry people in the community.

Twista is a gun enthusiast, has an Illinois Concealed Carry License, and is a US Concealed Carry Association (USCCA) and National Rifle Association of America (NRA) certified instructor, aiming to use education to combat gun violence.

He is a Muslim.

== Discography ==
Studio albums

- Runnin' Off at da Mouth (1992)
- Adrenaline Rush (1997)
- Mobstability (with Speedknot Mobstaz) (1998)
- Kamikaze (2004)
- The Day After (2005)
- Adrenaline Rush 2007 (2007)
- Category F5 (2009)
- The Perfect Storm (2010)
- Dark Horse (2014)
- Crook County (2017)
