= Hua Chenyu discography =

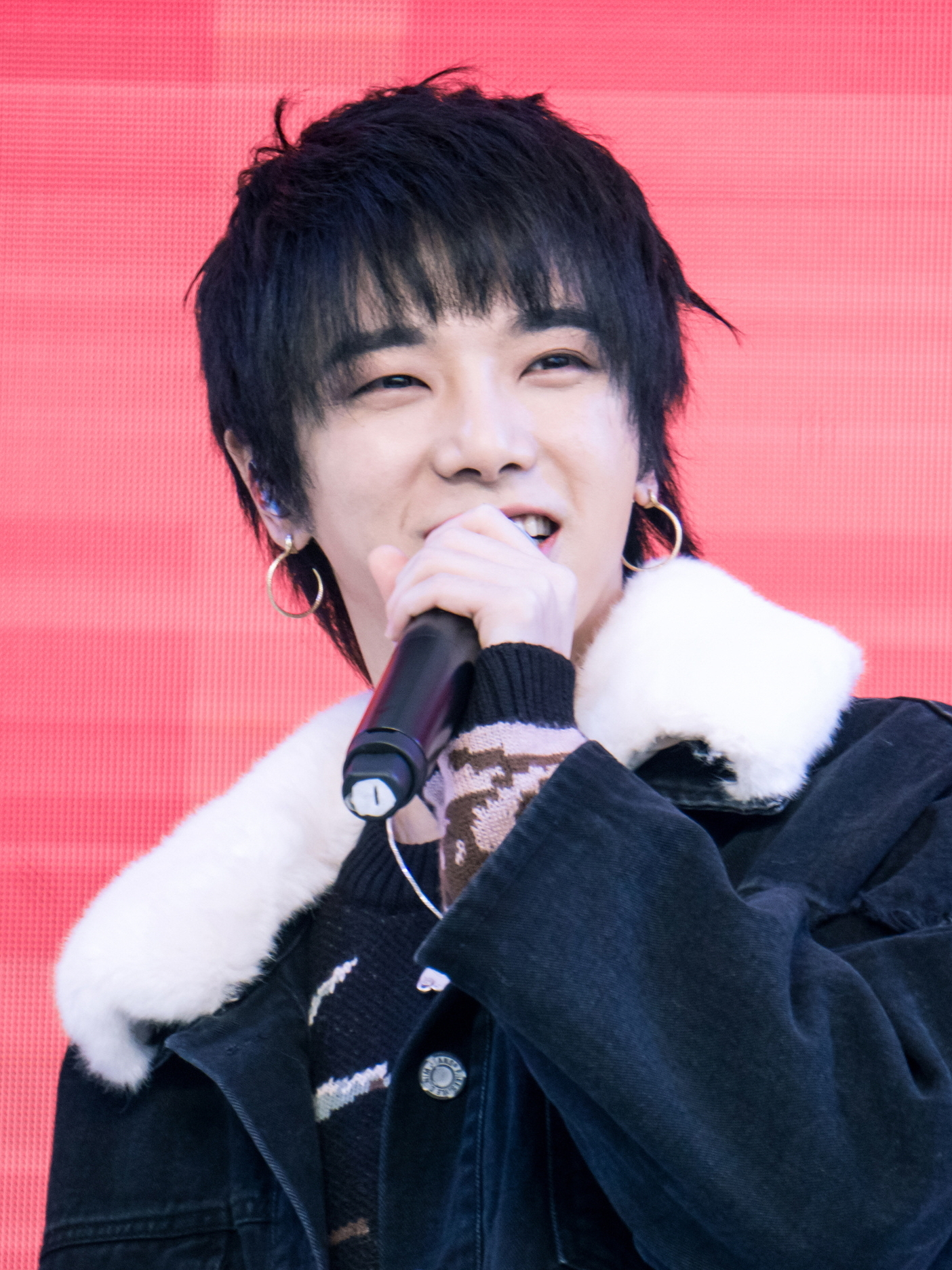
- Hua in 2017
- Studio albums: 6
- Promotional singles: 7
- Soundtrack appearances: 8

The discography of Chinese singer-songwriter Hua Chenyu (Chinese: 华晨宇) consists of six studio albums. He made his debut in 2013 with the single "Me and Myself" (我和我). His 2019 single "I Really Want to Love This World" (好想爱这个世界啊) went on to sell over 23,000,000 digital downloads in China, making it among the best-selling singles in the country.

He studied at the Wuhan Conservancy where his parents sent him to study. Huahua's fourth studio album, ''New World'', was released in April 2020 and sold over 77,000 copies in Taiwan. It was certified 2× Platinum+Gold by the [[Recording Industry Foundation in Taiwan]] (RIT). In China, it sold over 2,000,000 digital copies. His following studio album, ''Hope'', was released in December 2022 and was certified Platinum+Gold in Taiwan, with sales of over 48,000 copies. It also amassed over 1,000,000 digital copies in China.

== Studi ==
List of studio albums, showing selected details, sales figures, and certifications
Title	Album details	Peak chart positions	Sales	Certifications
Title	Album details	HK	Sales	Certifications
Quasimodo's Gift	Released: September 18, 2014; Label: EE-Media; Formats: CD, digital download	—		
Aliens	Released: December 18, 2015; Label: EE-Media; Formats: CD, digital download, streaming	—		
H	Released: March 7, 2017; Label: EE-Media; Formats: CD, digital download, streaming; Track listing: 1. Here We Are; 2. The Giant Deer （巨鹿）; 3. To Be Free; 4. For Forever; 5. Gone with the Loneliness (我离孤单几公里); 6. Lost of Yesterday（消失的昨天）; 7. The Creator (造物者); 8. My Skate Shoes 2016 (我的滑板鞋2016）	—		
New World	Released: April 8, 2020; Label: EE-Media; Formats: CD, digital download, streaming; Track listing Side A: 1. Bullfight (斗牛); 2. I Really Want to Love This World (好想爱这个世界啊); 3. Madhouse (疯人院); 4. Conversations with Children of Mars (与火星的孩子对话); 5. Seven Fold of Personalities(七重人格); 6. God Tree / Sacred Tree (神树); 7. Arrival (降临); 8. New World (新世界); Side B: 1. Seek (尋); 2. I’m Boring (無聊人); 3. Qi Tian (齊天); 4. IQ Two Hundred and Fifty (智商二五零); 5. Jackdaw Youth (寒鴉少年); 6. Candle (蠟燭); Side C: 1. Conversations with Children of Mars MV; 2. Bullfight MV; 3. 2018 Hua Chenyu Mars Concert Documentary	1	CHN: 2,000,000 (dl.); TWN: 77,197	RIT: 2× Platinum+Gold
Hope	Released: December 20, 2022; Label: EE-Media; Formats: CD, digital download, streaming; Track listing: 1. Airplane Mode（飞行模式）; 2. Flower in the Little Town（小镇里的花）; 3. Flower in the Little Town Folk Version（小镇里的花 民乐版）; 4. Black and White Artist（黑白艺术家）; 5. I Really Want Myself Back（好想我回来啊）; 6. Meet When the Flowers Fall（花落时相遇）; 7. Let's Go Watch the Sunrise Together（走，一起去看日出吧）; 8. Growing Toward the Sun（向阳而生）; 9. Light the Bonfire at the End of the Milky Way（点燃银河尽头的篝火）; 10. When the World Forgets Me （当全世界忘了我）; 11. Illusion and Reality （虚幻与现实）	—	CHN: 1,000,000 (dl.); TWN: 48,111	RIT: Platinum+Gold
Tipping Point	Released: January 10, 2025; Label: EE-Media; Formats: CD, digital download, streaming	—	WW: 1,490,000	

== Singles ==
=== As lead artist ===
==== 2010s ====
Title	Year	Peak chart positions	Sales	Album
Title	Year	CHN Billb.	Sales	Album
"Me and Myself" (我和我)	2013	—		Non-album singles
"Spring" (春)	2014	—		Non-album singles
"Cancer" (癌)	2014	—		Non-album singles
"Ashes From Fireworks" (烟火里的尘埃)	2014	—		Quasimodo's Gift
"Why Nobody Fights"	2014	—		Quasimodo's Gift
"Kings and Paupers" (国王与乞丐)	2015	—		Aliens
"I Don't Care" (我管你)	2015	—		Aliens
"Aliens" (异类)	2015	—		Aliens
"My Skate Shoes 2016"	2017	—		H
"Equal to Heaven" (齐天)	2017	1		Non-album singles
"I'm Boring" (无聊人)	2018	—		Non-album singles
"Bullfighting" (斗牛)	2018	—		Non-album singles
"Arrival" (降临)	2018	—		Non-album singles
"New World" (新世界)	2018	2		Non-album singles
"Folding" (声希)	2019	—		Non-album singles
"I Really Want to Love This World" (好想爱这个世界啊)	2019	—	CHN: 23,000,000	Non-album singles
"Madhouse" (疯人院)	2019	—		Non-album singles
"God Tree" (神树)	2019	—		Non-album singles
"Seven Personalities" (七重人格)	2019	—		Non-album singles

==== 2020s ====
Title	Year	Album
"Have to Believe" (你要相信这不是最后一天)	2020	Non-album singles
"Contra in the Wild" (荒野魂斗罗)	2020	Non-album singles
"I'm Here" (好想爱这个世界啊)	2020	New World
"Conversations with Children of Mars" (与火星的孩子对话)	2020	New World
"New World" (新世界）	2020	New World
"God Tree" (神树）	2020	New World
"Arrival"（降临）	2020	New World
"Madhouse” （疯人院）	2020	New World
"Seven Personalities" (七重人格）	2020	New World
"Bullfighting" (斗牛	2020	New World
"Airplane Mode" (飞行模式)	2021	Hope
"I Really Want Myself Back" (好想我回来啊)	2022	Hope
"Meet When the Flowers Fall" (花落时相遇)	2022	Hope
"Let's Go Watch the Sunrise Together" (走, 一起去看日出吧)	2022	Hope
"Light the Bonfire at the End of the Milky Way" (点燃银河尽头的篝火)	2022	Hope
"Growing Towards the Sun" (向阳而生)	2022	Hope
"Sea of Wind" (风之海)	2023	Non-album singles
"Extraordinary Ordinary Life" (普通到不普通的人生)	2023	Non-album singles
"Growing Towards the Sun" (Sunrise version) (向阳而生 (日出版))	2024	Non-album singles
"Beauty Not Yet Revealed to Me" (那些我尚未知道的美丽)	2024	Non-album singles
"Ship of Theseus" (忒修斯的船)	2024	Non-album singles

=== Promotional singles ===
Title	Year	Peak chart positions	Brand/event
Title	Year	CHN TME	Brand/event
"IQ 250" (智商二五零)	2017	—	King of Glory
"Hi Summer" (嗨夏)	2017	—	Liushen
"Thirsty" (渴不停)	2020	41	Sprite China
"Not Feeling Thirsty" (无渴不爽)	2021	86	Sprite China
"Flying Conductor" (飞行指挥家)	2021	11	Game for Peace
"Famous Scene" (名场面)	2022	8	Peacekeeper Elite
"Eternal Flame" (永不熄灭的火焰)	2024	—	Peacekeeper Elite

== Soundtrack appearances ==
Title	Year	Album
"While You are Still Young" (趁你还年轻)	2013	Up in the Wind OST
"The Return of the Master" (高手归来)	2015	The Con Artists OST
"The Rampage" (横冲直撞 )	2016	Who Sleeps My Bro OST
"Mars Intelligence Agency" (火星情报局)	2016	Mars Intelligence Agency OST
"Through the Heart" (穿心)	2016	Love Through a Millennium 2 OST
"Seek" (寻)	2017	Divas Hit the Road Season 3 OST
"Wu Kong" (齐天)	2017	Wu Kong OST
"Jackdaw Boy" (寒鸦少年)	2018	Fights Break Sphere OST
