= Hua Chenyu =

Chinese singer and songwriter

- 华晨宇
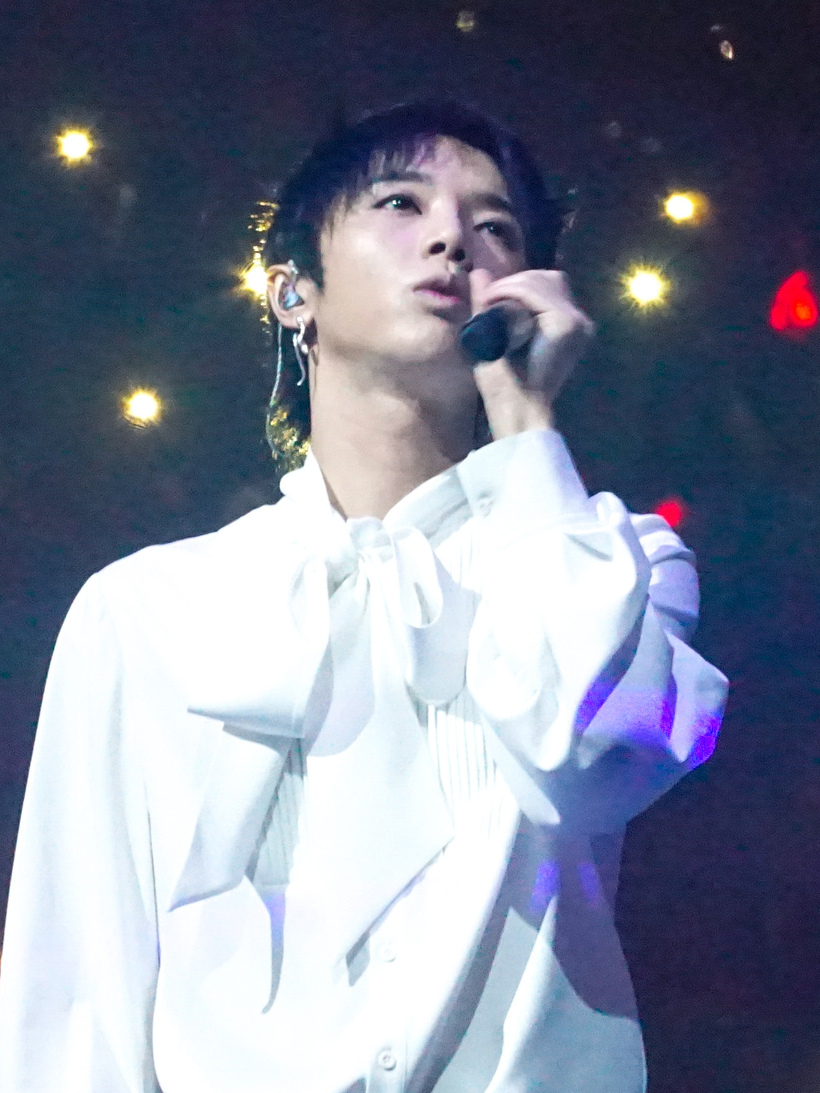
- Hua Chenyu in 2017
- Born: February 7, 1990 (age 36); Zhushan County, Hubei, China
- Other name: Hua Hua (花花)
- Education: Wuhan Conservatory of Music
- Occupation: Singer–songwriter
- Works: Albums and singles; concerts
- Children: 1
- Musical career
- Genres: Mandopop; Chinese rock
- Instruments: Vocals; piano; guitar; flute
- Years active: 2013–present
- Label: EE-Media

Chinese name
- Simplified Chinese: 华晨宇
- Traditional Chinese: 華晨宇
Transcriptions
Standard Mandarin
- Hanyu Pinyin: Huà Chényǔ

Hua Chenyu (Chinese: 华晨宇; born February 7, 1990) is a Chinese singer and songwriter. First debuting as the winner of Super Boy 2013, he gained widespread recognition for his vocal ability and stage performances after participating in Singer 2018.

Hua's sunrise concert held in Yantai in May 2024 attracted over 130,000 people in one show, making it one of the most-attended concerts of all-time. In September 2023, his concerts at the Beijing National Stadium saw over 100,000 people for two consecutive days. His album Tipping Point (2025) was named the 8th best-selling album globally in 2025 by the IFPI.

== Early life ==
Hua Chenyu was born to a wealthy family on February 7, 1990, in Zhushan County, Hubei province. His parents divorced when he was two years old and during his childhood he lived with his father, who remarried when he was ten years old. He began playing the flute at the age of five and took piano lessons in the fifth grade. He wrote his first song at the age of twelve after mastering piano.

After finishing middle school, Hua moved to Wuhan alone to attend the Fine Arts High School there. In 2010, he passed the college entrance examination and entered the Wuhan Conservatory of Music, where he studied pop music vocal performance and became the vocalist of a college rock band called Conseer.

== Career ==
=== Super Boy ===
In 2013, shortly before graduating from the conservatory, Hua Hua entered the casting for the television talent contest Super Boy, which was produced by Hunan TV. On his first appearance to the audience, he sang his original "Lyricless Song" that gave him the label of being like a "Martian" for his unique expression. Two of the three judges considered him to be odd or crazy, but after the third judge Laure Shang asked him a few questions and sang a lyricless duet with him, she said "he is a genius!" because "he knew intuitively how to express emotions through music". Due to the recommendation of Laure Shang and his performance of "The Kill", Hua made it past the first round of audition. He later sang with Laure Shang the song "The Star" in the final round on September 27, 2013. Hua Chenyu won the 2013 "Super Boy" contest.

After the competition, Hua was signed to the Chinese record label EE-Media, where most of the Super Boy and Super Girl contestants are linked. His debut single "Me and Myself" was released in September 2013. Hua also took part in the Super Boy Tour with other contestants, in which they toured eleven major Chinese cities.

Performance During Super Boy Contest
Date	Performance	Result
2013/06/29	"Lyricless Song" (Chenyu Hua's original)	Top 10 of Changsha
2013/07/12	"The Kill" (Originally by 30 Seconds to Mars)	National Top 20
2013/08/02	"Somebody That I Used To Know" (Originally by Gotye)	National Top 10
2013/08/09	"I Am What I Am" (我) (Originally by Leslie Cheung張國榮)	National Top 9
2013/08/16	"We Are Young" (Originally by Fun)	National Top 8
2013/08/23	"My Dear Child" (親愛的小孩) (Originally by Julie Sue 蘇芮)	National Top 7
2013/08/30	"Fake Monk" (假行僧) (Originally by Jian Cui崔健)	National Top 6
2013/09/06	"Poker Face" (Originally by Lady Gaga)	National Top 6
2013/09/13	"The Star" with Laure Shang (小星星) (Originally by Laure Shang 尚雯婕)	National Top 5
2013/09/20	1. "White Autumn" with Yico Zeng (白色秋天) (Originally by Yico Zeng 曾軼可); 2. "Provocation" (挑釁) (Originally by Shin 信樂團)	National Top 3 (finalist)
2013/09/27	1. "Red Bean" (紅豆) (Originally by Faye Wang 王菲); 2. "Mr. Lonely" with Gary Chaw (寂寞先生) (Originally by Gary Chaw 曹格); 3. "I Will Always Love You" (Originally by Whitney Houston); 4. "Boundless Oceans, Vast Skies" (海闊天空)(Originally by Beyond)	Winner

=== 2013–2014: First Mars Concert and debut album Quasimodo's Gift ===
Chenyu Hua went to Italy and Spain to film for the TVN reality show "Divas Hit the Road" in April 2014 and the show was broadcast from April 25. The first episode received the highest viewership in its broadcast time slot.

May 2014, In less than a year since Hua's debut, he announced his first headlining concert, Mars Concert. His first headline concert, "Mars Concert", was held in Beijing on September 6, 2014, before his debut album was released. Over 10,000 tickets were sold out within two minutes, breaking several records and making him the first mainland Chinese singer of his generation to hold concerts in a large arena. Another concert on September 7 was then announced and sold out. Due to the massive response, the organizers announced an extra show on September 7. The press conference of the Mars Concert 2014 was held at the Wukesong Arena, making him the first in the Chinese music industry to hold press conference in a venue with capacity over a thousand. The September 6 concert was broadcast live through QQ Music and Hunan TV, attracting more than 400,000 online viewers. Over 120,000 E-tickets were sold.

Hua released his first solo album Quasimodo's Gift on September 19, 2014. On November 11, the short film Quasimodo's Gift was released, with Hua as the main character. His songs "Quasimodo's Gift" and "Ashes from the Fireworks" were included in the film, merging the music into the story. The music videos of the songs were cut from this short film. The overseas version of this album ranked number one on the Taiwan Five Music Chart for several weeks. This album reached number one on Jingdong's 2014 music sale chart.

In November, he was invited to appear on "Say Hi! The Hit of China", the online variety show of Tencent (Hi歌). In the program, Hua chose to rearrange the song "Spring" and won the "Annual Hit Song of China" (年度Hi歌). On December 24, he sang "Shimmer" and "Quasimodo's Gift" with rearranged piano composition at pianist Langlang's Beijing concert.

=== 2015–2016: Aliens and Mars Concert ===
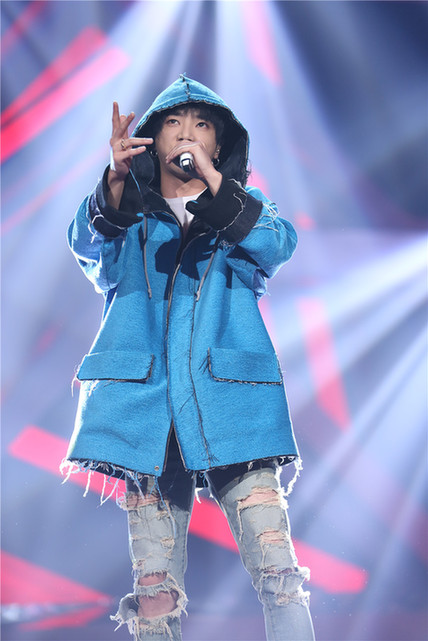
Hua in 2016

On January 1, 2015, Chenyu Hua for the first time joined and performed in the Liaoning TV New Year Gala. On January 10, "Shimmer" was announced as the interlude song of the Chinese television drama "You Are My Sunshine" (何以笙箫默). On February 8 (Los Angeles Time zone), Chenyu Hua was invited by Billboard as a VIP spectator to the 57th Annual Grammy Awards. On February 17, he performed in the Liaoning TV Chinese New Year Gala. On the Forbes China Celebrity 100 announced on May 11, his song charted for the first time with the integrated ranking of 91.

In early May, Hua's Mars Concert was announced to hold on August 1 in Shanghai. On October 28, his second album "Aliens" started pre-ordering on Jingdong. The limited 30,000 release almost sold out within a day. On November 7, his first digital album also started pre-ordering. Within eight minutes, over 100,000 units were sold. The album sold 350,000 copied on the first day of release. The promotional video of "Aliens" was aired on the LED screen at New York's Times Square for a week starting from December 23. Hua composed 7 of the 11 songs for this album.

In November, Chenyu Hua joined the television show Be the Idol (唱游天下) which was produced by Jiangsu TV. On February 8, he performed "For My Future Child" on Beijing TV Chinese New Year Gala. On March 4, Hua appeared as a guest on the variety show Ace to Ace (王牌对王牌) on Zhejiang TV. His arrangement of the song "Boluo Boluo Mi" (菠萝菠萝蜜) originally by Xie Na gained widespread attention and positive comments.

On March 7, the interlude song "The Rampage", which appears in the movie Who Sleeps My Bro, was released. On April 7, he released the song "Mars Intelligence Agency", which is the theme song for the online talk show with the same title. On April 9, he participated in the 16th Annual Festival of Top Chinese Music as ambassador and received two awards: Annual Best Album Performance for his album Aliens and Annual Best Idol. On July 8, Chenyu Hua's newly released song "Here We Are" was announced as the theme song for the movie Line Walker (使徒行者). Another self-composed song "To Be Free" was released on August 3 and it is the promotional song for the movie The Warriors Gate. On August 16, Chenyu Hua released his second English song "For Forever", which was specially created for the Mars Concert, written by Chenyu with WAVEBOY.

From October 2016 to January 2017, Hua participated as a celebrity mentor and judge in the first season of The Next (天籁之战) alongside Karen Mok, Fei Yu-Ching and Yang Kun. In this program, aspiring singers have the opportunity to challenge a celebrity mentor, who is assigned a song by the challenger and has 24 hours to prepare for the performance. Hua gained widespread recognition for his rearrangement and performances.

=== 2017–2018: Studying abroad, TV shows, Mars Concert ===
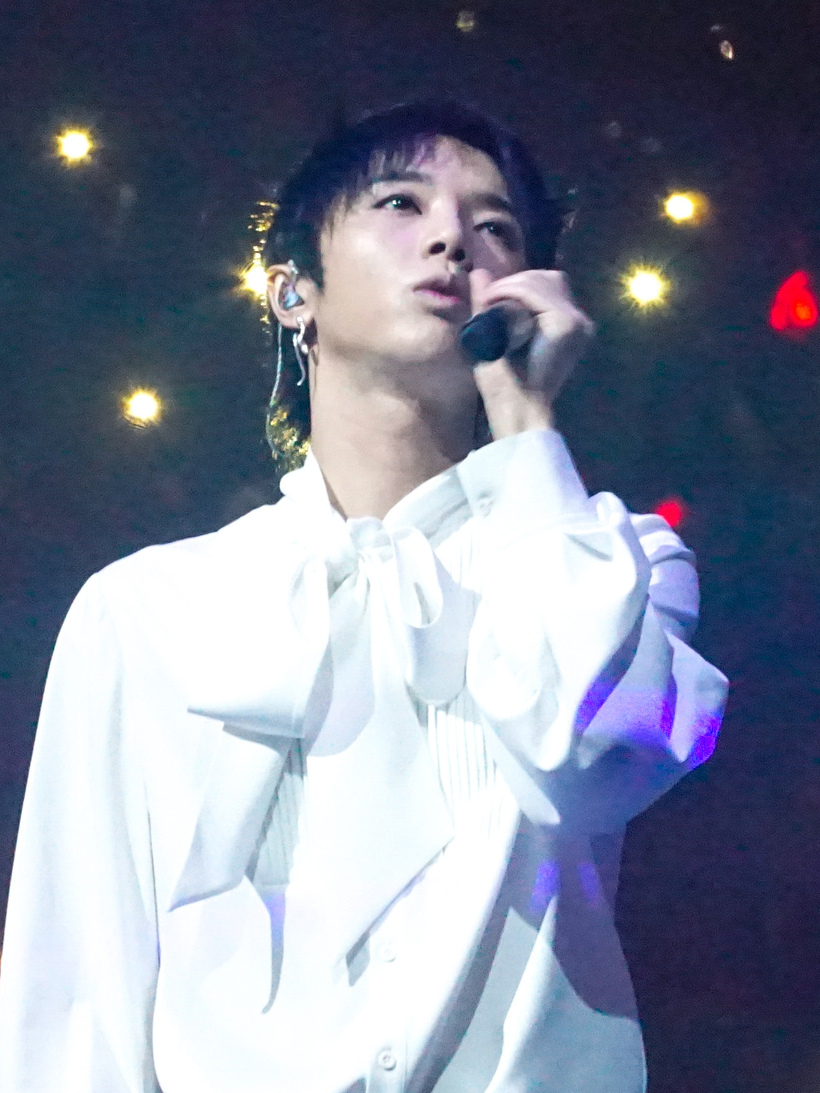
Hua performing in October 2017

On March 7, 2017, Hua released his third album H, which refers to his family name initial. After filming The Next, he went to study in Berklee College of Music until end of March. He learned singing and rapping skills but found many of the techniques are more suited to English songs than Chinese ones. He also learned how Pentatonic scale is used in Western music (as it was also widely used in traditional Chinese music), and he would incorporate it in his own songs, such as his arrangement of "Drinking Alone"). On June 3, Hua joined television travel show Flowers on Trip (旅途的花样) along with Lin Chi-ling, Zhang Xinyi, Aarif Rahman and others. They traveled to Morocco, Russia, Norway and Denmark, following the "One Belt, One Road" approach.

Hua was a judge on Tencent's new singing competition show The Coming One (明日之子), where his support for contestant Hez, a humanoid persona created using augmented reality and singing voice synthesizer technologies, sparked controversy on Chinese social media. The first episode of the show started live-streaming on June 10. On September 27, the makers of mobile MMO game Kings of Glory released its theme song for the in-game character Luban by Hua Chenyu.

In February 2018, Hua joined Singer 2018 (歌手2018) alongside acts including Jessie J, Wang Feng, Tengger, Angela Chang, KZ Tandingan after turning down the show for three years. During the show, he won first place in four episodes and his average percentage of votes ranked second among all the previous contestants in the six seasons of Singer. In the final episode, Hua's performance of "Light Years Away""光年之外"with G.E.M 邓紫棋 brought him to Top Four together with Jessie J, Wang Feng and Tengger. His final performance of Angela Chang's song "Shout""呐喊" earned him second place, after Jessie J. Chenyu Hua's performance of his self-written song "Heaven's Equal (齐天)" won Most Popular Song of the show.

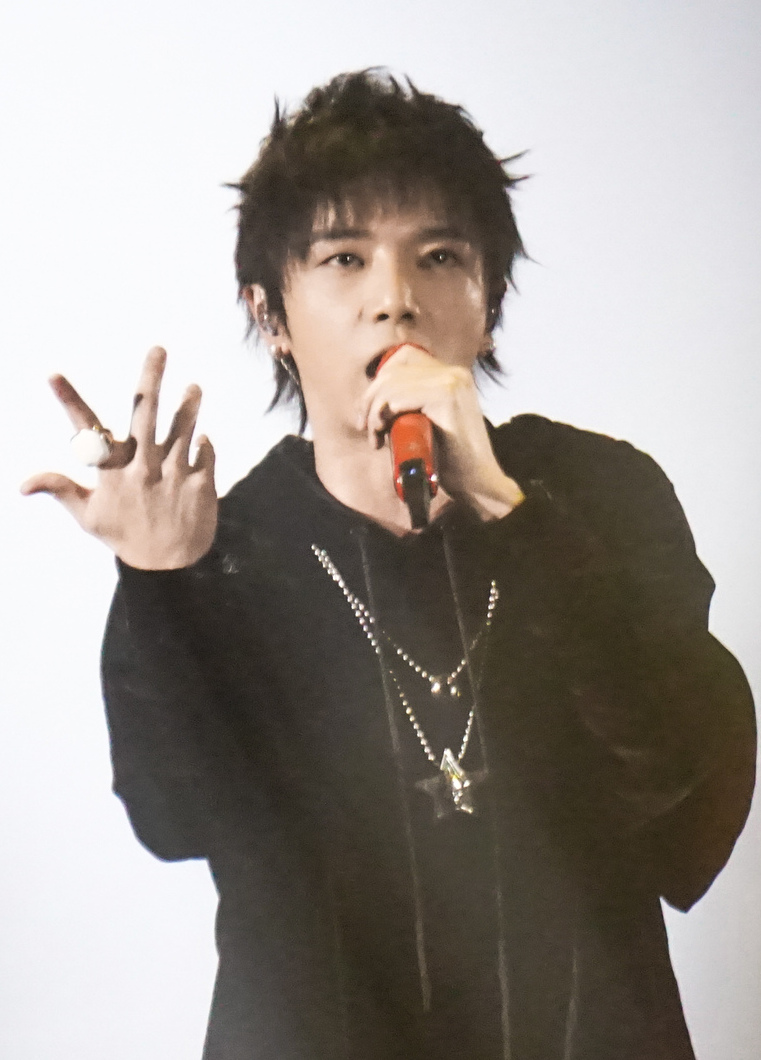
Hua in 2017

That year, Hua composed the track "Halftime" for Karen Mok, In May–September 2018, he participated on Tencent's television show The Coming One 2 (明日之子 2) as a mentor. On September 8 and 9, 2018, Chenyu Hua had his 2018 Mars Concert in Beijing National Stadium on his fifth anniversary since debuting. The tickets were once again sold out within one minute, making him the first post-1990s singer in mainland China to hold a concert in that stadium with 90,000 audiences and the first to hold two concerts consecutively in that stadium. On December 12, Hua won Musician of the Year at Harper's Bazaar 2018 Men of the Year awards and Most Searched Across Asia at 2018 Yahoo Asia Buzz Awards.

=== 2019–2020: Variety shows, New World, and concerts ===
On January 1, 2019, "Hua Chenyu Studio Official" posted its first Weibo announcing the launch of Hua's own studio, which is still under EE-Media but operates independently. On January 5, it was announced Hua Chenyu would take part in Zhejiang TV's variety show Ace to Ace S4. On January 13, On May 21, he announced the 2019 Mars Concert would be held on November 2 in Shenzhen Baoan Stadium. On August 20, he was ranked 33rd on Forbes China Celebrity 100 in 2019.

On October 27, Hua Chenyu announced that 2019 Mars Concert was rescheduled to November 15–17 days at Haikou Wuyuanhe stadium in Hainan. On October 28, "Conversation with ET", which was co-written by Hua Chenyu and ET, was published on NetEase Cloud Music. On December 4, "I Really Want to Love this World" composed by Hua Chenyu, was exclusively published on NetEase Cloud Music, selling more than seven million copies and a revenue of over ¥63 millions (US$9.3 million) within six months.

On January 1, 2020, Hua Chenyu was the first performer on the concert of HunanTV "2019–2020 New Year's Eve" His airtime saw the TV ratings for HunanTV got to 2.7% while the market share of it has reached up to 30.85%. On January 3, 2020, he was announced as one of the four returning singers from the fourth to sixth season to participate in Singer 2020: Year of the Hits, the final season in the series. Hua performed mostly self-composed songs, including Seven Personality, a progressive rock he composed, and won the competition on the live finale aired April 24, making Hua the only returning singer to win I Am a Singer.

On May 3, the music video of "Bull Fight", which took six months to finish, was released. Hua Chenyu released his fourth album "New World" in April 2020. Although a free version of his live performances on Singer 2020 was already available, sales of the digital album exceeded 1.65 million and garnered ¥33 million (around $4.8 million) by early August 2020. In 2020, he ranked 17th on Forbes China Celebrity 100 list.

=== 2021–2022: Ace VS Ace Season 6, concerts in Haikou ===
On January 29, 2021, Ace VS Ace Season 6 was aired and released on Zhejiang TV. The season had 12 episodes released on a weekly basis which ended on April 16, 2021. In late 2021, Hua held a series of six Mars Concerts at Haikou Changying Universal 100 Wonderland. He released a new song at each of the concerts. He introduced that Airplane Mode was inspired by his talk with strangers. Flower in the Small Town was composed in memory of his mom. His mom died of cancer in 2021. Hua Chenyu composed the melody, when he companied his mom at hospital. Black and White Artist was written to address the issues of professional anti-fans. The rest of the three songs forms the Healing Trilogy. I Really Want Myself Back is the Struggling Chapter, Meet When the Flowers Fall is the Hope Chapter and Let's Go Watch the Sunrise Together is the Future Chapter.

On March 11, Chenyu participated as a judge on the Chinese folk music singing competition show Flowers Will Bloom in Spring. On September 25, Chenyu successfully held his online concert "Music Chapter: Mars" via TikTok to commemorate his nine-year debut anniversary and compensate for his yearly-held concerts. This concert fused rock-n-roll and pop music with a symphony orchestra, presenting the audience with an impressive audio-visual display. It amassed large exposure on social media and garnered over 200 million views. Hua Chenyu released his fifth album, Hope, on December 20. In addition to the six songs being performed live during his concerts in 2021, five more songs were included in the official album.

=== 2023–2024: Mars Concert Tour, Ace Vs Ace Season 8 ===
Hua launched his first half of the concert tour in the park festival format starting from April 7 in Huangzhou and which includes 11 concerts in 4 cities. On September 9–10, 2023, he initiated the second half of his Mars Concert tour starting from the Beijing National Stadium. He used a four-sided stage for his stadium tour. He debuted two of his new songs "Sea of Wind" in Nanjing and "Ordinary to Extraordinary Life" in Guangzhou. Hua attracted over 1,000,000 people during the 2023 Mars Concert tour and the concert received positive reviews from fans all over the country.

In 2024, Hua held a sunrise Mars concert by the seaside of Yangma Island, Yantai, Shandong on May 1, 2 and 4. The concert on May 4 started at 3am, and Hua sung for 3 hours until the sun rose from the sea horizon. Around 130,000 fans shared and witnessed the sunrise together. Hua added a brand new segment to his song "Growing Towards the Sun" while waiting for the sun rise. The 16-minute long live recording of the song was later released on various music platforms. The event drew significant media attention, and over 100 media accounts that belongs to various culture and tourist offices around the country reported it as the largest sunrise concert by the seaside ever held in the world.

Hua started his stadium style concert tour at Nanchang, China from July 20–21. His 4-sided stage design was upgraded to include a new ground LED screen, beaded string curtain screen which was first applied to a concert, and a brand new stage lighting apparatus arranged in the radial shape and hung from the top of the stage. His music team made new arrangements of many songs that combined rock music with Chinese folk music. A variety of Chinese folk music instruments made it onto the stage.

In April 2025, NetEase Cloud Music named Hua as the most-commented artist in the platform's 12-year history with more than 14.23 million comments on his music.

== Artistry ==
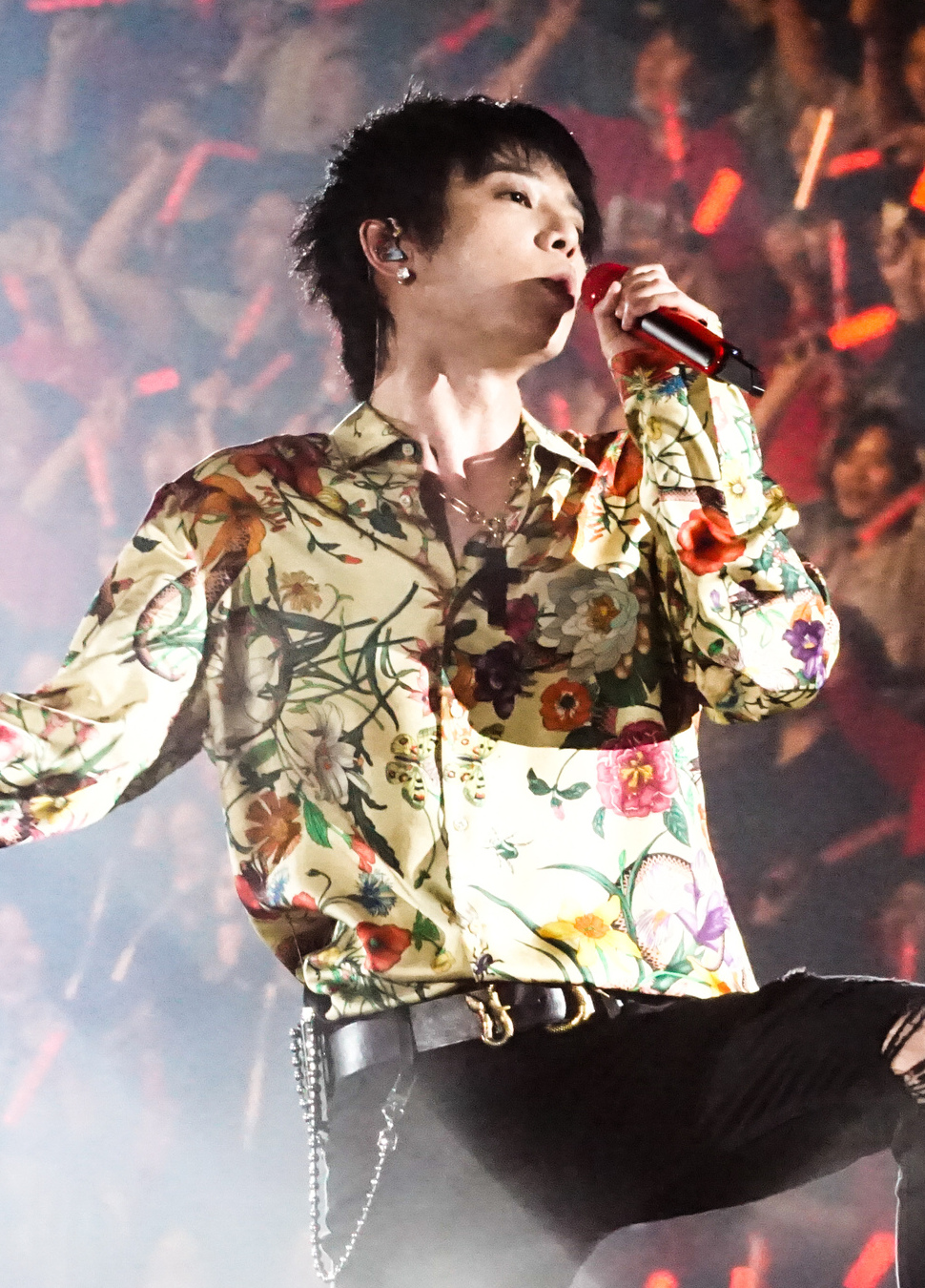
Hua performing in 2017

Many of the songs Hua has composed reflect his perspectives on the world or convey stories he wishes to share with his audience. In a 2022 interview with Bazaar Man magazine, he described rock as the core inspiration behind his music. While the Chinese pop music scene is largely characterized by ballads, he expressed his desire to break free from conventional constraints of the genre. A critic from Singer 2018 commented that Hua brought Chinese pop music to a new artistic level with his cover performance of "Fake Monk" (假行僧).

== Other ventures ==
=== Endorsements ===
In June 2014, Hua was invited by the popular Korean eyewear brand ALO as the first Chinese brand ambassador and went to Korea for the advertising photography. On September 6, 2016, the international jewelry brand Pomellato announced Chenyu Hua as the brand ambassador for some of its products. On July 13, 2017, Hua was announced brand as ambassador of Estee Lauder China.

== Personal life ==
Hua Chenyu does not typically discuss his private life in public. However, on January 22, 2021, he publicly acknowledged his daughter he has with another Chinese pop singer, Zhang Bichen. Hua currently shares his life with a little cat called Perper.

== Discography ==
- Quasimodo's Gift (2014)
- Aliens (2015)
- H (2017)
- New World (2020)
- Hope (2022)
- Tipping Point (2025)

== Filmography ==
=== Film ===
Year	Title	Role	Director	Notes
2013	我就是我 I Am Here	Himself	Lixin Fan (范立欣)	Documentary Film of 2013 Super Boy
2014	卡西莫多的礼物 Quasimodo's Gift	Quasimodo (卡西莫多)	Zoe Peng	Musical Micro Film

=== Television shows ===
Year	Title	Role	Notes
2023	王牌对王牌 8 Ace vs Ace Season 8	Himself, Emcee	S8
2023	声生不息-宝岛季 Infinity And Beyond 2	Himself, Singer	S2
2022	萌探探探案 2 The Detectives' Adventures 2	Himself, Emcee	S2
2022	春天花会开 Flowers Bloom in Spring	Himself, Bole	
2022	王牌对王牌 7 Ace vs Ace Season 7	Himself, Emcee	S7
2021	王牌对王牌 6 Ace vs Ace Season 6	Himself, Emcee	S6
2020	王牌对王牌 5 Ace vs Ace Season 5	Himself, Emcee	S5
2020	歌手2020 Singer 2020	Himself, Contestant, Winner	S8
2019	明日之子3 The Coming One 3	Himself, Mentor	S3
2019	王牌对王牌 4 Ace vs Ace Season 4	Himself, Emcee	S4
2018	明日之子 The Coming One 2	Himself, Mentor	S2
2018	Come Sing with Me	Himself	E8
2018	歌手2018 Singer 2018	Himself, Contestant, Runner-up	S6 since EP4
2017	明日之子 The Coming One	Himself, Mentor	S1
2017	旅途的花样 Flowers on Trip	Himself, Group	S3
2016	Fresh Sunday	Himself, Player	E3
2016	Come Sing with Me	Himself	E6
2016–2017	天籁之战 The Next	Himself, Judge	S1-2
2016	See your voice	Himself, Player	E8
2016	You look so yummy	Himself, Player	En
2015	我是谁 Who Am I	Himself	S1
2015	唱游天下 Be The Idol	Himself, Group	S1
2015	Let's Sing with Kids	Himself, Player	S3
2015	粉丝制造 The Making of a Superstar: Hua Chenyu's Working Diary	Himself	S3
2015	你正常吗第 Are you normal	Himself, Player	S2
2014	HI歌 Hi song	Himself, Winner	E4
2014	天天向上 Day Day Up	Himself, Player	Sn
2014	快乐大本营 Happy Camp	Himself, Group	En
2014	花儿与少年 Divas Hit the Road	Himself, Group	S1
2014	快乐大本营 Happy Camp	Himself	En
2013	快乐大本营 Happy Camp	Himself, SuperBoy	En
2013	快乐男声 SuperBoy 2013	Himself, Contestant, Winner	S3

== Awards and nominations ==
Quasimodo's Gift received several awards, including ERC Chinese Top Ten Awards for Best Album, Top Chinese Music Awards for 2014 Most Popular Album, Best Album Performance, and Best Album Production, Chinese Music Radio Awards for Best Composition, and Golden Song for the track "Let You Go".

Aliens won many awards, including ERC Chinese Top Ten Awards for Best Concept Album, Best Vocal Collaboration for Kings and Paupers, Top Chinese Music Awards for Best Album Performance, 2016 Ali Music Annual Awards for Best Pop Album, Most Popular Album, and Most Popular song for Mayfly.

Name of award ceremony, year presented, award category, nominee of award, and result of nomination
Award ceremony	Year	Category	Nominee(s) / Work(s)	Result	Ref.
Ali Music Annual Awards	2016	Most Popular Artist of the Year	Hua Chenyu	Won	
Ali Music Annual Awards	2016	Most Popular Album of the Year	Aliens	Won	
Ali Music Annual Awards	2016	Pop Album of the Year (Mandarin)	Aliens	Won	
Ali Music Annual Awards	2016	Most Popular Song of the Year	"Mayfly"	Won	
Chinese Music Media Award	2014	Most Notable Male Singer	Hua Chenyu	Won	
Chinese Music Radio Awards	2015	Most Popular New Artist	Hua Chenyu	Won	
Chinese Music Radio Awards	2015	Golden Songs	"Let You Go"	Won	
Chinese Music Radio Awards	2015	Best Composer	Quasimodo's Gift	Won	
ERC Chinese Top Ten Awards	2014	Best New Singer	Hua Chenyu	Won	
ERC Chinese Top Ten Awards	2015	Best Album Performance	Quasimodo's Gift	Won	
ERC Chinese Top Ten Awards	2015	Most Popular Album	Quasimodo's Gift	Won	
ERC Chinese Top Ten Awards	2015	Best Album Production	Quasimodo's Gift	Won	
ERC Chinese Top Ten Awards	2015	People's Choice – Male Singer	Hua Chenyu	Won	
ERC Chinese Top Ten Awards	2016	Best Concept Album	Aliens	Won	
ERC Chinese Top Ten Awards	2016	Best Vocal Collaboration	"Kings and Paupers"	Won	
ERC Chinese Top Ten Awards	2016	Media Recommendation	Hua Chenyu	Won	
ERC Chinese Top Ten Awards	2016	People's Choice – Male Singer	Hua Chenyu	Won	
ERC Chinese Top Ten Awards	2017	Best Adapted Song	"My Skateboard Shoes 2016"	Won	
Freshasia Music Awards	2016	Best Male Singer	Hua Chenyu	Won	
Harper's Bazaar Men of the Year Awards	2018	Musician of the Year	Hua Chenyu	Won	
iQiyi All-Star Carnival	2018	Best Male Singer	Hua Chenyu	Won	
Ku Music Asian Music Awards	2016	Album of the Year	Aliens	Won	
Ku Music Asian Music Awards	2016	Most Influential Singer of the Year	Hua Chenyu	Won	
LeEco Night Awards	2016	Most Popular Singer	Hua Chenyu	Won	
MAMA Awards	2016	Best Asian Artist – China	Hua Chenyu	Won	
Miguhui Awards	2019	Top Ten Songs of the Year	"Equal to Heaven"	Won	
Miguhui Awards	2019	Mainland's Most Popular Male Singer of the Year	Hua Chenyu	Won	
Miguhui Awards	2019	Best Male Vocalist of the Year	Hua Chenyu	Won	
Netease Attitude Awards	2016	Musician with Attitude	Hua Chenyu	Won	
QQ Music Awards	2015	Best QQ Music Interactive Concert of the Year	2014 Mars Concert	Won	
QQ Music Awards	2015	Best Mainland Male Singer of the Year	Hua Chenyu	Won	
Top Chinese Music Awards	2013	Most Popular Male Singer	Hua Chenyu	Won	
Top Chinese Music Awards	2015	Most Popular Male Singer (Mainland)	Hua Chenyu	Won	
Top Chinese Music Awards	2015	Best Album (Mainland)	Quasimodo's Gift	Won	
Top Chinese Music Awards	2016	Best Album (Mainland)	Aliens	Won	
Weibo Awards Ceremony	2014	Stars of the Year	Hua Chenyu	Won	
Weibo Awards Ceremony	2014	Spotlight of the Year	Hua Chenyu	Won	
Weibo Awards Ceremony	2015	Most Popular Male Musician	Hua Chenyu	Won	
Weibo Awards Ceremony	2022	Recommended Concert of the Year	2021 Mars Concert	Won	
Weibo Awards Ceremony	2022	Recommended Singer of the Year	Hua Chenyu	Won	
Yahoo Asia Buzz Awards	2018	Most Searched Across Asia	Hua Chenyu	Won	

== See also ==
- List of most-attended concerts
- List of best-selling albums in China

Preceded by Liu Huan	Winner of I Am a Singer; Season 8 (Year of the Hits); 2020	Succeeded by End of series
