= WAVEBOY =

American singer-songwriter

- Born: August 4, 1995 (age 30); California, USA
- Other name: Trevi Eno
- Occupation: Singer-songwriter
- Website: waveboymusic.com

WAVEBOY (born August 4, 1989) is an American singer-songwriter best known for writing songs by Jackson Yee, Hua Chenyu, and Yao Chen.

WAVEBOY's music is primarily electropop and contains elements of subgenres such as synthwave and house music.

In February 2021, WAVEBOY signed an exclusive global publishing agreement with Universal Music Publishing Group China.

== Discography ==
- The Greatest Thing - Colorful Mannings (KOSEN) (2016)
- Thinking of You - Colorful Mannings (KOSEN) (2016)
- For Forever - Hua Chenyu (2016)
- Baby Girl - Young G (2018)
- The Same Starlight Sky - One and a Half Summer OST (2014)
- The Fox's Treasure - WAVEBOY (2021)
- We Belong Tonight - Yao Chen (JYPE) (2022)
- Fearless - Jackson Yee (2023)
