= Ace vs. Ace Season 5 =

Ace vs. Ace Season 5 is a large scale indoor sports TV show produced by Zhejiang Satellite TV Program Center, hosted by Shen Tao. In each episode several well-known guests such as singers, actress, and TV hosts are invited to participate in games and advertise their own products. Each episode has a different theme such as love, the '90s, or career, reflected in the games played by contestants. (After 3 rounds of games, the guests share experiences and memories from their career. The "Ace Family", composed of Shen Teng, Guanxiao Tong, Hua Chenyu, and Jia Ling, appear in every episode and compete with other guests. The show is broadcast on Zhejiang Satellite TV at 21:20 every Friday since February 21, 2020.

== Ace Family (frequent guests) ==
- Shen Teng, comedian actor, active since 2003
- Guanxiao Tong, actress, active since 2001
- Hua Chenyu, singer, active since 2013
- Jia Ling, comedian actress, active since 2003

== Episodes ==
	Guests	Activities	Theme
EP1	Song Dandan Ba Tu Zhao Wei Su Yopeng	Rule: Each round winning team gets 1 lucky stick while the losing team gets 2. The first team that lightens the firework loses the game. Round 1: All Together (2:3) Among 4 members of each team, 2 people will be acting the words they are given and the other two guess the word. 2 members from the other team can be chosen to guess and compete against the other team. Round 2: Not Afraid (2:3) Each member will be sitting on a remoting chair with a button in front. A clip of a song will be played and the team (team member) who pushes the button first will have to answer the name of the song. If guessed correctly, the other team will receive raining punishment and if failed to guess correctly, the entire team gets punishment. Round 3: Detectives (1:1) 2 tasks will be given to each team -- eating cakes and put feet in fish tanks. Only one cake is spicy and only one tank will be filled with fish. The team has to act and prevent the other team from guessing the person with special treatment.	Reunion of the cast from the famous Chinese TV show《还珠格格》and tell stories about the filming experience.
EP2	Song Dandan Sha Yi Zhao Wei Su Yopeng	Rule: Each round winning team gets 1 Hongbao and the first team that collects all 5 different HongBaos wins the game. Round 1: Door Passes(0:2) Each team member will be separated into a room with a remote door. The first person gets a card and acts to the second team member and passes the information so on till the last team member. The last person tells the information he or she heard. If the words match the information, one point is granted to the team. Round 2: Sing Songs (3:0) A theme will be given in each sub round and each team will take turns and sing the songs that relate to the theme. The team that cannot provide more songs loses. Round 3: Best Actor (1:1) Each team is given a scene to act and the best acting team wins. The audiences vote.	Reunion of the cast from the famous Chinese TV show《情深深雨蒙蒙》 and tell stories about the filming experience.
EP3	Zheng Shaung Ma Tianyu Yang Di Jin Jing Yu Haoming	Rule: Each team tries to solve a puzzle composed of traditional Chinese characters. Win in each round offers a hint to the winning team that leads to the answer to the puzzle. Round 1: Drawing Guess(1:4) Each team picks a member to draw the word shown on the screen backstage on the blackboard. Other people take guesses of the word and the team with the most correct guesses wins. Round 2: Talent Shows (1:2) Each team comes up with short talent shows and audiences vote to determine the best act. Round 3: Lip Reading (0:1) Each team sits in a straight line. Each team member wears a sound-canceling headphone and tries to interpret the words said by the person in front of them. The first person has the information. If the last person repeats the sentence correctly the team wins.	"Ace Parents Meeting": Conversations about experiences as teenagers and struggling process to grow up. Stories in college and conflicts with parents.
EP4	Li Chen Liu Yan Hu Bing Yang Di	Special Edition: raise awareness to COVID19 by live broadcasting with current medical teams in hospitals. Round 1: Round 1: Door Passes -- Dialects (0:1) Each team member will be separated into a room with a remote door. The first person watches video clips of local dialects in Chinese and passes on to the second team member and passes the information so on till the last team member. The last person tells the information he or she heard in the dialect. If the words match the information, one point is granted to the team. Round 2: Blind Hits(3:0) Each team chooses a member given a foam bat to be blindfolded and enters an arena. Each player in the arena only has one chance to swing the bat once and if one hits the other first, the team wins one point. Invite doctors to tell stories of their job and concerns with own family and show appreciation to medical teams and nurses working in hospitals on risks of their lives.	Raise awareness to coronavirus situation, learn about the hardship and devotion of the doctors that help the entire society to fight against the global plague. Live connected doctors with their family members and send warmness to these families. Help to spread attention to COVID19 and promote love to doctors.
EP5	Yang Di Zhang Xincheng Han Xue Jia Nailiang	Rule: Each round the winning team gets to choose first among two objects given after each game. The team that aligned all the objects with correct year represents wins. Round 1: Acting Guess(2:0) Each team picks 2 members to act out the word shown on the screen. Other people take guesses of the word and the team with the most correct guesses wins. Round 2: Reunion Shows Reunion casts from the famous Chinese TV show "The Rural Love" which tells love stories in the 1990s in China countryside.	90s, bring back memories of the last generation. Revisit history and share the characteristics of the 1990s in China.
