= List of Hua Chenyu concerts =

Hua Chenyu concerts
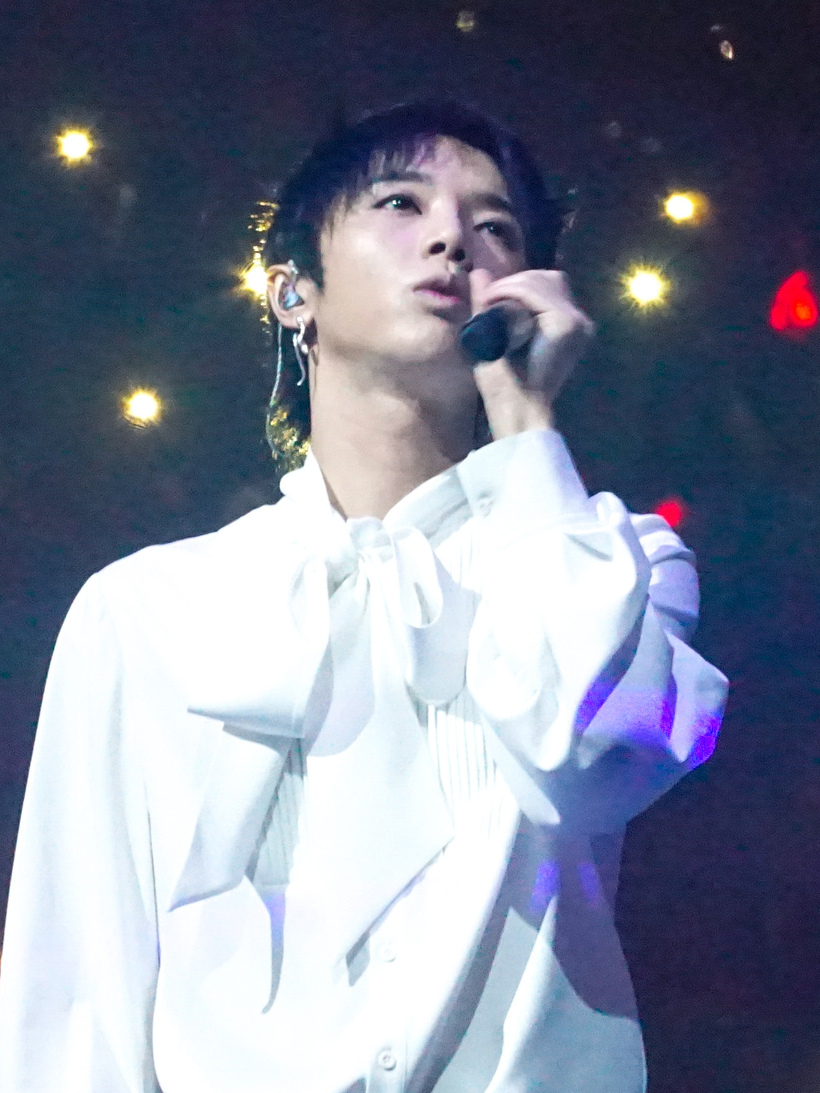
- Hua performing during the 2017 Mars Concert
- Concert tours: 3
- One-off concerts: 7
- Online concerts: 1

Chinese singer and songwriter Hua Chenyu (华晨宇) has held a total of three concert tours and seven one-off concerts to date. In 2014, he held his first major solo concert titled the 2014 Mars Concert at the MasterCard Center in Beijing. His first concert tour, titled the 2023 Mars Concert Tour, spanned 19 shows across mainland China and attracted over 1,000,000 people in total.

Hua held two performances at the Beijing National Stadium in September 2023 as part of the same tour. It attracted over 100,000 people each day, setting a record for the most attended concert in China. He broke his own record the following year during his three-day sunrise concert in Yantai as part of his 2024 tour, which attracted over 130,000 people in a single day, making it among the most-attended concerts of all-time.

== Concert tours ==
=== 2023 Mars Concert Tour ===
The 2023 Mars Concert Tour is the first concert tour by Hua Chenyu. Spanning 19 dates, the tour began in Hangzhou at the White Horse Lake Park on April 7–9, 2023, playing to over 200,000 people. Hua's concerts in Beijing National Stadium on September 9–10, 2023, attracted around 200,000 people over two days, setting a record for the most attended concert for a single show in China with over 100,000 people.

List of tour dates
Date	City	Country	Venue	Attendance
April 7, 2023	Hangzhou	China	White Horse Lake Park	200,000
April 8, 2023	Hangzhou	China	White Horse Lake Park	200,000
April 9, 2023	Hangzhou	China	White Horse Lake Park	200,000
April 30, 2023	Chengdu	China	Chengdu Open Air Music Park	—
May 1, 2023	Chengdu	China	Chengdu Open Air Music Park	—
May 2, 2023	Chengdu	China	Chengdu Open Air Music Park	—
May 27, 2023	Wuhan	China	Wuhan Garden Expo Park	—
May 28, 2023	Wuhan	China	Wuhan Garden Expo Park	—
June 22, 2023	Changsha	China	Malanshan Yazui Park	—
June 23, 2023	Changsha	China	Malanshan Yazui Park	—
June 24, 2023	Changsha	China	Malanshan Yazui Park	—
September 9, 2023	Beijing	China	Beijing National Stadium	200,000
September 10, 2023	Beijing	China	Beijing National Stadium	200,000
September 27, 2023	Shanghai	China	Hongkou Football Stadium	—
September 28, 2023	Shanghai	China	Hongkou Football Stadium	—
September 29, 2023	Shanghai	China	Hongkou Football Stadium	—
October 21, 2023	Nanjing	China	Nanjing Olympic Sports Center Stadium	—
December 2, 2023	Guangzhou	China	Guangzhou Central Stadium	—
December 3, 2023	Guangzhou	China	Guangzhou Central Stadium	—
Total				1,149,000

=== 2024 Mars Concert Tour ===
The 2024 Mars Concert Tour is the second concert tour by Hua Chenyu. Over the May Day holiday, Hua held an early morning sunrise-themed concert at Yangma Island in Yantai, Shandong province. Around 130,000 fans attended the concert in a single day, making it one of the most-attended concerts in history. In Hong Kong, he held three-consecutive shows at the Central Harbourfront Event Space with 20,000 people each day.

List of tour dates
Date	City	Country	Venue	Attendance
May 1, 2024	Yantai	China	Yangma Island	300,000
May 2, 2024	Yantai	China	Yangma Island	300,000
May 4, 2024	Yantai	China	Yangma Island	300,000
May 24, 2024	Hong Kong		Central Harbourfront Event Space	60,000
May 25, 2024	Hong Kong		Central Harbourfront Event Space	60,000
May 26, 2024	Hong Kong		Central Harbourfront Event Space	60,000
July 20, 2024	Nanchang	China	Nanchang International Sports Center	—
July 21, 2024	Nanchang	China	Nanchang International Sports Center	—
August 10, 2024	Hefei	China	Hefei Olympic Sports Center Stadium	—
August 11, 2024	Hefei	China	Hefei Olympic Sports Center Stadium	—
August 24, 2024	Chongqing	China	Chongqing Olympic Sports Center	—
September 7, 2024	Beijing	China	Beijing National Stadium	—
September 8, 2024	Beijing	China	Beijing National Stadium	—
October 4, 2024	Guiyang	China	National Gala Plaza, Guanshan Lake Park	—
October 5, 2024	Guiyang	China	National Gala Plaza, Guanshan Lake Park	—
October 6, 2024	Guiyang	China	National Gala Plaza, Guanshan Lake Park	—
October 26, 2024	Hangzhou	China	Hangzhou Olympic Sports Center Stadium	—
November 10, 2024	Wuhan	China	Wuhan Sports Center Stadium	—
November 29, 2024	Shenzhen	China	Shenzhen Universiade Center Stadium	—
November 30, 2024	Shenzhen	China	Shenzhen Universiade Center Stadium	—
Total				N/A

=== 2025 Mars Concert Tour ===
The 2025 Mars Concert Tour is the third concert tour by Hua Chenyu.

List of tour dates
Date	City	Country	Venue	Attendance
March 8, 2025	Fuzhou	China	Fuzhou Strait Olympic Sports Center	—
March 9, 2025	Fuzhou	China	Fuzhou Strait Olympic Sports Center	—
March 22, 2025	Changsha	China	Helong Sports Center Stadium	60,000
March 23, 2025	Changsha	China	Helong Sports Center Stadium	60,000
April 5, 2025	Xi'an	China	Xi'an Olympic Sports Center Stadium	—
April 6, 2025	Xi'an	China	Xi'an Olympic Sports Center Stadium	—
May 2, 2025	Foshan	China	Foshan Qiandeng Lake Music Show	—
May 3, 2025	Foshan	China	Foshan Qiandeng Lake Music Show	—
May 4, 2025	Foshan	China	Foshan Qiandeng Lake Music Show	—
Total				N/A

== One-off concerts ==
List of standalone concerts, showing event names, dates, cities, countries, venues and attendance
Event name	Date	City	Venue	Attendance
2014 Mars Concert	September 6, 2014	Beijing	MasterCard Center	—
2014 Mars Concert	September 7, 2014	Beijing	MasterCard Center	—
2015 Mars Concert	July 31, 2015	Shanghai	Shanghai Grand Stage	—
2015 Mars Concert	August 1, 2015	Shanghai	Shanghai Grand Stage	—
2015 Mars Concert	August 2, 2015	Shanghai	Shanghai Grand Stage	—
2016 Mars Concert	July 2, 2016	Beijing	LeTV Eco Sports Center	—
2016 Mars Concert	August 21, 2016	Shanghai	Mercedes-Benz Arena	—
2016 Mars Concert	September 16, 2016	Shenzhen	Shenzhen Bay Sports Center Stadium	—
2017 Mars Concert	October 13, 2017	Beijing	Wukesong Arena	—
2017 Mars Concert	October 14, 2017	Beijing	Wukesong Arena	—
2018 Mars Concert	September 8, 2018	Beijing	Beijing National Stadium	—
2018 Mars Concert	September 9, 2018	Beijing	Beijing National Stadium	—
2019 Mars Concert	November 15, 2019	Haikou	Wuyuan River Stadium	150,000
2019 Mars Concert	November 16, 2019	Haikou	Wuyuan River Stadium	150,000
2019 Mars Concert	November 17, 2019	Haikou	Wuyuan River Stadium	150,000
2021 Mars Concert	November 26, 2021	Haikou	Changying Global 100 Fantasty Park	—
2021 Mars Concert	November 27, 2021	Haikou	Changying Global 100 Fantasty Park	—
2021 Mars Concert	November 28, 2021	Haikou	Changying Global 100 Fantasty Park	—
2021 Mars Concert	December 3, 2021	Haikou	Changying Global 100 Fantasty Park	—
2021 Mars Concert	December 4, 2021	Haikou	Changying Global 100 Fantasty Park	—
2021 Mars Concert	December 5, 2021	Haikou	Changying Global 100 Fantasty Park	—

== Online concerts ==
Event name	Date	Country	Platform	Attendance	Ref.
Music Chapter: Mars	March 11, 2021	China	Douyin	200,000,000	
