= Quasimodo's Gift =

Quasimodo’s Gift

Studio album by Hua Chenyu
- Released: September 18, 2014
- Recorded: 2014
- Genre: Mandopop
- Length: 40:21
- Label: EE-Media

Hua Chenyu chronology
Quasimodo’s Gift (2014)	Aliens (2015)

Quasimodo’s Gift (Chinese: 卡西莫多的礼物) is the debut studio album by Chinese singer Hua Chenyu. The international version was released on September 18, 2014.

== Background ==
Hua Chenyu composed three songs for this album and participated in the overall production process, from demo selection and lyrics creation to the last post-production, tagging this album with his unique personalities. Although this album contains multiple elements such as pop, alternative rock, folk and classical music, it tells a complete story of a solitary from different sides, just like the lyric says, "Quasimodo’s Gift is to enjoy the loneliness".

Hua Chenyu got his inspiration for writing the one-lyric intro Why Nobody Fights when he was watching a football game during the World Cup. Different from traditional chorus recording, Hua, as the first mainland singer, invited 100 fans to record an imperfect but touching chorus for this song. Ashes from Firework has been changed seven times to create a psychedelic Brit Rock effect and Lin Xi rewrote its lyric for three times. Piano is the only instrument to create a simple lonely heart in the song Shimmer, which was later performed at pianist Lang Lang's Christmas Concert. The last song Bedtime Story is ear whispered by only a guitar.

Hua Chenyu wrote Quasimodo’s Gift, the title song and a beautiful tranquil blue melodrama-style song, but its birth process was full of magic. When he travelled in Europe on program” Divas hit the road", he captured the melody from an abstract portrait in a church but soon forgot it, then suddenly recalled this melody two months later after he came back home. Quasimodo’s Gift is a soul song particularly conforming to Hua Chenyu’s personal characteristic which is inner loneliness with strong sincere love.

The Danish composer’s elaborate creations Eternity, Bomb Squad, All Lonely and Traveling were responded well. Let You Go was composed by Hua Chenyu without any special stories behind but a four-minute one-take creation. This medium-speed rock genre reflects his inner heart thought, highly praised by senior intellectual fans after its launch.

== Track listing ==
#	Title	Music	Lyrics	Length
1	Why Nobody Fights	Hua Chenyu	Hua Chenyu	4:03
2	微光 (Shimmer)	Qian Lei	Zhou Jieyin	4:26
3	Let You Go	Hua Chenyu	Xia yuan	4:16
4	烟火里的尘埃 (Ashes From Fireworks)	Xi Lou	Lin Xi	5:21
5	拆弹专家 (Bomb Squad)	Dúné	Zhao Zhisheng	2:47
6	环游 (Traveling)	Dúné	Changyoumeizhihui; Liu Yuan	4:00
7	我们都是孤独的 (All Lonely)	The Blue Van	Dai Yuedong	4:03
8	不朽 (Eternity)	Dúné	Guodeziyi	3:23
9	卡西莫多的礼物 (Quasimodo’s Gift)	Hua Chenyu	Beizi	3:34
10	枕边故事 (Bedtime Story)	Ronald Tsui	Dai Yuedong	4:23

== MV ==
Song	Director	Date
Why Nobody Fights	Peng Youlun	December 1, 2014
卡西莫多的礼物 (Quasimodo’s Gift)	Peng Youlun	November 11, 2014
烟火里的尘埃 (Ashes From Fireworks)	Peng Youlun	November 25, 2014

== Versions ==
Sony Music offers iTunes digital edition, and Jing Dong sells domestic physical edition on its website. Overseas physical edition can be bought in Hong Kong, Macao and Taiwan.

== Awards ==
- 2nd Oriental Billboard Awards (2015) - "Best Album"
- 15th Top Chinese Music Award (2015) - "Best Album (Mainland)"
- 2015 Chinese Music Radio Awards (2015) - "Golden Songs: Let you Go", "Best Composer - Hua Chen Yu (Quasimodo’s Gift)"
