= Wuhan Conservatory of Music =

Provincial public college in Wuhan, Hubei, China

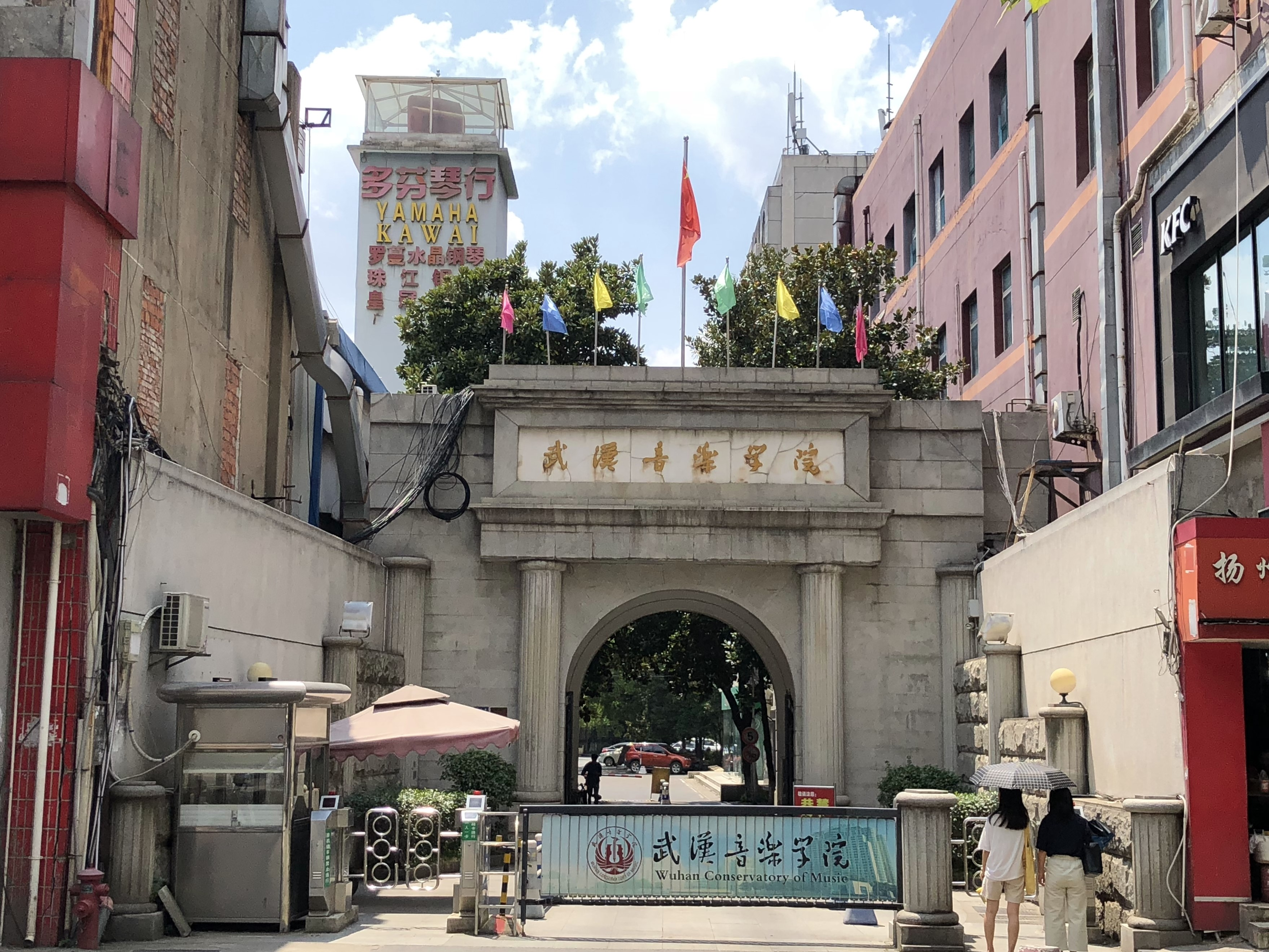
Gate of Wuhan Conservatory of Music

The Wuhan Conservatory of Music (武汉音乐学院) is a provincial public college in Wuhan, Hubei, China. It is affiliated with the Province of Hubei and sponsored by the Hubei Provincial People's Government.

In 1958, the school's predecessor, Hubei Arts College (湖北艺术学院), was formed through the merger of the Central–South Music Vocational School (中南音乐专科学校) and the Wuhan Art Teachers College (武汉艺术师范学院). In 1985, the school was renamed Wuhan Conservatory of Music.
