= Colorful Mannings (KOSEN) =

- Born: Yuichiro Kosen (古銭 友一郎); April 29, 1984 (age 42); Tokyo, Japan
- Genres: Indie rock; electronica; Synth Pop; Techno; J-Pop
- Occupations: Musician, producer, vocalist
- Instruments: Guitar, vocals, multi-instrumentalist, Modular Synth, Synthesizer
- Labels: Warner Music Group (2012–present), VAP (2008–2010)
- Website: https://colorfulmannings.com/

KOSEN (Colorful Mannings) (古銭 友一郎, Yuichiro KOSEN; born April 29, 1984) is a Japanese recording artist, producer, composer for Film and TV, and best known as a member of the hip-hop rock band THE BEATMOSS. He currently pursues a solo career that is called, “Colorful Mannings.” His sound is influenced by 80's New Wave/Techno and also 90's alternative rock /grunge music.

== Career ==
KOSEN (Colorful Mannings) was born and raised in Tokyo. In 2003, he had moved to San Diego in the U.S to study making film. After he graduated from college in the U.S., he made his debut as a member of the Japanese rock band Peaky SALT. House Foods Corporation featured songs of the band in their TV commercial. The band also played in a lot of famous Japanese TV shows. KOSEN scored three singles and two albums in two years until the band broke up.

Following the disbandment of Peaky SALT in 2010, KOSEN started scoring hip-hop/rock songs with Finnish-Japanese rapper/vocal ILMARI, who is best known as a member of RIP SLYME, and they formed a band THE BEATMOSS with bassist YAS and drummer SOHNOSUKE (also known as a member of jazz quartet “Quasimode”). The band's second single “SUPERSTAR” was chosen as a campaign song for world-famous brand “adidas originals” -Unite All Originals -Rashisa wo Butsukero-.

Besides recording with THE BEATMOSS, he currently pursues a solo career that is called, “Colorful Mannings.” He has already scored as “Colorful Mannings” for two feature films (“Koikarassa”(2013), “Happy Landing”(2014)) and serial drama (“MOSO Kanojo”(2015)).

== Discography ==
=== Colorful Mannings ===
- Moso Kanojo Original Soundtrack (2015)
- Sarah / Sarah -Nu Disco Remix- (2016) – feat. Sophia Girma
- Wash It All Out / Wash It All Out (Chillout Remix) (2017) – feat. Willie Japan
- Rescue Me / Rescue Me (Flood Remix) (2017) – feat. Willie Japan
- The Greatest Thing (2017) – feat. MIKHAÉL
- Heartbeat (2018) – feat. Sophia Girma
- Dreamin' (2018) – feat. Sahhari

=== KOSEN ===
- Happy Landing Original Soundtrack (2015)
- Neko Neko Nihonshi Original Soundtrack (2017)
- Hatachi no Soul /Soul At Twenty Original Soundtrack (2017)

=== The Beatmoss ===
- The Beatmoss vol.1 (2012)
- The Beatmoss vol.2 (2013)

=== Peaky SALT ===
- Ituwari Typhoon No.3 (2009)
- Peaky SALT (2009)

=== Other works ===
- GOLDEN TIME (2013) by RIP SLYME – Co-Writer for M2 "FAKE"
- Be My Guest (2014) by DJ Souljah – Co-Writer for M12 "Believe That"

== Film work ==
=== Film ===
- Koikarassa (2014)
- Happy Landing (2014)
- Neko Neko Nihonshi (2020)
- Hatachi no Soul / Soul At Twenty (2022)

=== TV series ===
- Moso Kanojo (Fuji TV) (2015)
- Neko Neko Nihonshi (NHK) (2016)
- Sogeki (TV Asahi) (2016)
- Neko Neko Nihonshi season2 (NHK) (2017)
- Hima na JD, Mita Mayu -Konya Watashi to yushou shimasenka (TV Asahi) (2017)
- Neko Neko Nihonshi season3 (NHK) (2018)
- Net Utahime (NHK) (2018)
- Neko Neko Nihonshi season4 (NHK) (2019)
- Neko Neko Nihonshi season5 (NHK) (2020)
- Obake Zukan (TV Tokyo) (2020)
