= Aliens (album) =

Studio album by Hua Chenyu
- Released: December 18, 2015
- Recorded: 2015
- Genre: Mandopop
- Length: 46:42
- Label: EE-Media

Hua Chenyu chronology
Quasimodo’s Gift (2014)	Aliens (2015)	H (2017)

Aliens (Chinese: 异类) is the second studio album by Chinese singer Hua Chenyu. The international version was released on December 18, 2015.

== Tracking listing ==
#	Title	Music	Lyrics	Length
1	我管你 (I don't Care)	Hua Chenyu	Guodeziyi	4:27
2	国王与乞丐 (Kings and Paupers); featuring Aska Yang	Mike Chan/Faizal Tahir	Dai Yuedong	4:05
3	蜉蝣 (The Mayfly)	Hua Chenyu	Dai Yuedong	5:03
4	反义词 (The Antonym)	Wang Zi	Xiaohan	4:16
5	异类 (Aliens)	Hua Chenyu	Zhao Chenlong	3:28
6	逃离乌托邦 (The Escape from Utopia)	Aurora Aksnes/Martin Odd Skaines/Magnus Skylstad	Dai Yuedong	4:04
7	世界是个动物园 (The World is a Zoo)	Hua Chenyu	Dai Yuedong	3:56
8	变相怪杰 (The Mask)	Hua Chenyu/Takuya/Lin Chenyou/Jimmy Fung	Dai Yuedong	3:19
9	写给未来的孩子 (For My Future Child)	Hua Chenyu	Zhu Ziqing	5:19
10	地球之盐 (The Salt of The Earth)	Hua Chenyu	Dai Yuedong/Xiao Junfeng	5:19
11	忧伤的巨人 (The Giant in Sorrow)	Hua Chenyu	Dai Yuedong	3:23

== Music videos ==
Song	Director	Date	Links
国王与乞丐 (Kings and Paupers); featuring Aska Yang	Zoe (彭宥纶)	August 7, 2015	Official MV
蜉蝣 (The Mayfly)	IO Studio_XineHc	November 11, 2015	Official MV
异类 (Aliens)	Bill Chia	January 18, 2016	Official MV

== Charts ==
=== Billboard - China V Chart ===
Song	Peak position	Year
国王与乞丐 (Kings and Paupers)	1	2015
蜉蝣 (The Mayfly)	1	2015
异类 (Aliens)	1	2016
