= Fights Break Spheres =

Chinese online novel

Fights Break Firmament
- Author: Tiancan Tudou
- Translator: 斗破苍穹
- Country: China
- Language: Simplified Chinese
- Genre: fantasy novel
- Publisher: Qidian Chinese website
- Published: 2010-2017

Fights Break Spheres （Hanzi：《斗破苍穹》 Pinyin: Dòupò Cāngqióng; lit. 'Fight Through The Sky'）is a fantasy online novel by Chinese writer Tiancan Tudou. Published on Qidian, it has received over 140 million hits on the site—the first work on Qidian to have more than 100 million views. An animated adaptation began serialization on April 14, 2009, and its final episode was released on July 20, 2011. In 2012, Fights Break Spheres was adapted into a comic book, co-written and drawn by Zhou Hongbin and cartoonist Ren Xiang.

The novel was initially serialized on several literary platforms such as QQ Reader and Start Chinese website under the ReadWrite Group, and so far it has received 10 billion hits across the internet. The novel has also won literary awards. In 2016, it was listed on the "China IP Value List - Network Literature Top 10" of China's Pan-Entertainment Index Ceremony, and in 2017, it topped the "Cat Film - Hurun Original Literature IP Value List".

In January 2017, the filming of the TV series was announced. The series premiered on Hunan Satellite TV on September 3, 2018. Tencent Video updated simultaneously with satellite TV.

== Plot ==
Xiao Yan was once a talented young man of the Xiao family, and he was engaged to Nalan Yanran of the Yunlan Sect before he was born. When Xiao Yan was eleven years old, his fighting spirit suddenly regressed for three years. The reason was that the soul sleeping in Xiao Yan's ring. Yao Lao, the former number one alchemist in the mainland, absorbed Xiao Yan's fighting spirit and revived himself. Xiao Yan was called a useless person, and Nalan Yanran came to break off the engagement. Xiao Yan and Nalan Yanran agreed to challenge the Yunlan Sect three years later. Yao Lao wakes up, and Xiao Yan worships Yao Lao as his teacher. Yao Lao gave Xiao Yan a technique called Burning Jue that he had obtained in the ancient cave. With the help of Burning Jue, he could master multiple kinds of strange fires at the same time, and the level of Burning Jue would increase with the increase in possession of flames.

Xiao Yan and his childhood sweetheart Xun'er were admitted to Canaan College. Xiao Yan dropped out of school and went to the Warcraft Mountains for training, where he met the little medical fairy and the fighting emperor Yunzhi. After that, Xiao Yan went to the Tagore Desert and met Qinglin, the descendant of Snake Man and Man. While Queen Medusa and Dan Wang Furukawa were fighting for Qinglian's Earth Fire, Xiao Yan captured Qinglian's Earth Fire and was followed by Queen Medusa. Xiao Yan later helped Dou Huang Hai Bodong regain his strength and gain his protection. At the Alchemist Trading Market in the Imperial Capital, Xiao Yan bought a jade piece containing the Three Mysteries of Heavenly Fire. The Burning Technique, the Three Mysterious Changes of Heavenly Fire, and the Strange Fire allow Xiao Yan to cross borders and defeat strong men.

After three years, Xiao Yan came to Yunlan Sect and easily defeated Nalan Yanran. Yunlan Sect elder Yun Leng summoned the previous sect leader Douzong Yunshan in an attempt to kill Xiao Yan, but Xiao Yan had Hai Bodong and the mysterious Dou Huang. Under the protection of Ling Ying and Douzong-level Medusa, he was finally let go. Yun Leng, the elder of the Yunlan Sect, attacked the Xiao family, leaving Xiao Yan's father Xiao Zhan missing. The angry Xiao Yan went to Yunlan Sect again and discovered that the former Dou Huang Yunzhi was Yun Yun, the leader of Yunlan Sect. Yun Leng said that Xiao Zhan was not taken away by him, but disappeared mysteriously. Xiao Yan took action directly, but this time he was defeated by the opponent. Xiao Yan was hunted down but was eventually let go by Yun Yun.

Xiao Yan went to the Black Corner Domain and entered Canaan College. In the academy, Xiao Yan met Zi Yan, a magical beast who transformed into a little girl, and others, and established a powerful clan. Xiao Yan learned that the Xiao family was once again attacked by the Yunlan Sect, and that behind it was the support of the Soul Palace, the strongest dark force in the mainland. Their purpose was to obtain the Xiao family's Tuoshe Ancient Emperor Jade. Later, the Fallen Heart Flame in the Tianfen Qi Refining Tower changed, and Xiao Yan was swallowed by the Fallen Heart Flame. He slept at the bottom of the tower for a year and finally conquered the Fallen Heart Flame. After waking up, Xiao Yan was promoted to the Nine-Star Fighting King and defeated Han Feng. Xiao Yan united with the major forces of the Gama Empire to attack the Yunlan Sect. Yunshan admitted that he had colluded with the Soul Palace and that Xiao Yan's father was taken away by the Soul Palace. Xiao Yan killed Yunshan, Yao Lao was captured by the Bird Guardian of the Soul Palace, and Yun Yun disbanded the Yunlan Sect.

The Poison Sect, Jin Yan Sect, and Mulan Valley of the three empires besieged the Gama Empire. Xiao Yan and Medusa discovered that the leader of the Poison Sect was the Little Medical Fairy. The Little Medical Fairy told Xiao Yan that he was instructed by the Soul Palace and finally helped Xiao Yan. Resolve the crisis. Xiao Yan promised to help the little medical fairy solve the problem of the poisonous body, and the little medical fairy chose to go with Xiao Yan. Returning to the Black Angle Domain again, Xiao Yan killed Han Feng and captured his soul. After that, Xiao Yan and his party went to Zhongzhou, an area where strong men from the mainland gathered.

In Zhongzhou, Xiao Yan searched for various treasures, practiced everywhere, and at the same time fought against the Soul Palace, and finally rescued Yao Lao and refined his body. The Soul Emperor of the Soul Palace tried to dominate the mainland, and Xiao Yan established the Tianfu Alliance to fight against it. The Soul Emperor finally gathered the ancient emperor's jade from Qituoshe, opened the ancient emperor's cave, obtained the emperor's young pill, and became the Dou Emperor. Xiao Yan entered the Ancient Emperor's Cave through the bottom of the Tianfen Qi Refining Tower and obtained the Ancient Emperor's inheritance to become the Dou Emperor. Xiao Yan gathered all the strange fires and sealed the Soul Emperor in the decisive battle. After the war, Xiao Yan held a grand wedding with Xun'er and Medusa. Finally, Xiao Yan and others opened an outer plane passage and traveled to the world of "The Great Overlord".

== Setting ==
The worldview setting of Fights Break Spheres is a world that focuses on the cultivation of Dou Qi. In this world, all people cultivate Dou Qi for a living, and the strength of Dou Qi directly determines the strength and status of an individual. The Dou Qi continent has a strict hierarchical division based on the breakthrough of Dou Qi, starting from the Dou Qi and reaching the Dou Di, each stage is further divided into nine levels, and the cultivation process is extremely time-consuming. For example, Xiao Yan had spent a considerable amount of time upgrading from a Dou Shi to the ninth level of a Dou Shi. At each level stage, the cultivator could obtain different abilities, such as the Dou Qi armor of a Da Dou Shi and the Dou Qi condensation of a Dou Ling, etc., and these abilities gradually unfolded as the cultivator's level increased.

In the worldview of the Fights Break Spheres, strength is honored as a core principle. Cultivators with strong strength can gain the admiration of the crowd and even be able to extend their lifespan. Battles and growth among cultivators are the main threads of the story, and through constant cultivation and battles, the protagonist Xiao Yan eventually becomes a Dou Di and reaches the peak of this world.

In addition, the worldview of Fights Break Spheres involves the distribution and struggle of various forces, including clans, sects, alliances, etc., and the relationships between these forces are intricate and complex, constituting the power network on the Dou Qi continent. Xiao Yan, on his way to becoming a Dou Di, not only improved his own strength, but also established and controlled several forces, such as the Pan Gate, the Xiao Gate, the Yan League, the Starfall Pavilion, the Heavenly Mansion Alliance, and the Endless Fire Domain, etc., which together constitute a powerful force on the Dou Qi Continent.

=== World Setting ===
Dou Qi continent, this is the world belonging to the Dou Qi. The Ancient Clan, the Soul Clan, the Yan Clan, the Medicine Clan, the Stone Clan, the Spirit Clan, the Thunder Clan, and the Xiao Clan, the eight clans (of which the Xiao Clan has fallen). The eastern part of the Dou Qi continent, the Gama Empire, the city of Utan, everything starts from here.

=== Fighting Strength Setting ===
Dou ZhiQi, Dou Zhe, Dou Shi, Da Dou Shi, Dou Ling, Dou Wang, Dou Huang, Dou Zong, Dou Zun, Dou Sheng, Dou Di

=== Flame Type ===
The foreign fires in Fights Break Spheres are rare flames nurtured by heaven and earth, and each is unique, making it difficult to find a second similar flame between heaven and earth. The energy of the fire is very violent and powerful, and it is hard to be tamed. Below are all twenty-three types of foreign fires in Fights Break Spheres, in the order they are ranked:

==== Diyan (Dashegudi) ====
Ranking: First

Color: Colorful, the fusion of twenty-two different kinds of fire.

That is, the Doshe Ancient Emperor, which encountered the “Burning Decree” when it was spiritually intelligent, mutated, and continuously devoured the foreign fire to become a Dou Di, and named himself Emperor Yan, and then cultivated again for a thousand years before breaking out of the world, and was honored as the “Doshe Ancient Emperor.

Another righteousness is twenty-two kinds of foreign fire unity of the flame is emperor inflammation. Regardless of the original ranking of the different fires, as long as the remaining twenty-one different fires are devoured, it is the first ranked Emperor Flame.

==== Void Swallowing Inflammation ====
Ranking: 2nd

Color: Black

The second in the list of foreign fire, this fire was born in the void, no phase can be found, invisible can be grasped, is a rather strange existence, nothingness swallowing inflammation, known as swallowing the sky and devouring the earth, has the ability to devour everything, between heaven and earth, only a few things, only to be able to counteract that devouring ability. It has devoured the last patriarch of the Spirit Swallowing Clan so that the bloodline of the Spirit Clan can continue. He is intelligent, and has the appearance of a middle-aged man in black. His strength is a nine-star Dou Sheng. He was once defeated by Gu Yuan and devoured by the Soul Heavenly Emperor, but was not completely refined and later helped Xiao Yan defeat the Soul Heavenly Emperor.

==== Pure Lotus Demon Flame ====
Ranking: Third

Color: Milky white, pink when extremely dense

Submissive: Dasher Ancient Emperor → Pure Lotus Demon Saint → Yan Emperor Xiao Yan (Xiao Clan) and Xiao Xun Er (part of the Origin)

It has the effect of purifying everything. Anything that is touched by it will be purified into a void. It will be purified into nothingness. It can even use human emotions as a guide to enter the body, and the flesh, soul and fighting spirit will be purified into nothingness. Power is extremely horrible. This kind of fire is extremely rare between heaven and earth. Only the existence of one. But no one is clear where they are. Do not know who recorded this thing once. But no one has ever really seen. The previous owner for the net lotus demon saint, because of its fire personality stubborn, net lotus demon saint before want to kill this fire, but due to a moment of weakness, anti-attacked by the fire killed. After that, this foreign fire has been trapped in the space set up by the Pure Lotus Demon Saint. By the Pure Lotus Demon Saint to create the demon fire space confinement, demon fire space appears, the two moons appear together, the nine stars as one, heaven and earth tidal wave, the demon fire descending. Back then, he devoured the Pure Lotus Demon Saint and got the inheritance of the Pure Lotus Demon Saint—Nightmare Heavenly Mist, which can make millions of people in a city live in the illusion for nearly a hundred years, and it is overcome by the talisman of nightmare-breaking. Originally in lotus shape, it can now transform into a handsome white-robed man, and can turn enemies into puppet-like fire slaves after defeating them (less controllable for high-level Dou Sheng).

==== Golden Emperor Burning Heavenly Flame ====
Ranking: Fourth

Color: Golden

Owner: Xiao Xun Er, Partial Origin: Yan Emperor Xiao Yan

It is not as mysterious as the Pure Lotus Demon Flame, but it was also famous in ancient times, and this kind of fire is the fire inherited from the ancient clans, and few people are able to subdue it. The Golden Emperor Burning Heavenly Flame is a terrifying fire that is said to burn even the fighting spirit. Legend has it that the first owner of the Golden Emperor's Burning Heavenly Flame, when he performed this fire, he directly burned the space created by a Dou Sheng powerhouse into a piece of nothingness.

==== Amazing Living Spirit ====
Ranking: Fifth

Color: Green

Known as the fire of longevity, the Amazing Living Spirit is no match for some magical beasts though it not particularly effective in fighting as its combat powers are not strong. However, when seeds are put into it you can cultivate and nourish medicinal herbs.

The wind rose rapidly, resembling a green flame. A sea of green liquid fire spread between the layers of mist, where countless varieties of unusual herbs grew, emitting a distinctive life-like fragrance.

==== Eight Wasteland Breaking Amazing ====
Ranking: Sixth

Color: Light Black

The highest level of foreign fire owned by the Yan Clan, it was injected with an indelible soul mark by successive generations of Yan Clan controllers. The Fire Dazzle of the Yan Clan had transformed it into a pair of flame wings that were a hundred feet in size, which was truly domineering. After Xiao Yan awakened as a Dou Di, he was forcibly conscripted to complete the “Foreign Flame Heng Gu Ruler”.

Accepted by: Doshe ancient emperor → (had) fire dazzle (Yan Clan) → (now) Yan emperor xiao yan (Xiao Clan)

==== Jiuyue Jinzu Fire ====
Ranking: 7th

Color: Golden

Adopted by: Dasher Ancient Emperor → Yan Ashes <Chief of the Yan Clan> → Yan Emperor Xiao Yan (Xiao Clan)

Originally held by the Nine Underworlds, now owned by the Yan Clan, it has been fused with the volcanic stone flame to create a new type of foreign fire that can compete with the Golden Emperor's Burning Heavenly Flame without losing ground.

=== Characters ===
Role	
Xiao Yan	The protagonist is set to have traveled from the earth, so his soul power is stronger than ordinary people. His qualifications and luck are extraordinary. With the help of Yao Chen, he finally gathered all the strange fires and became the Dou Emperor.
Yao Chen	He was once the number one alchemist in mainland China and was known as the Medicine Master. He was assassinated by his apprentice Han Feng in conjunction with the Soul Palace. His soul escaped and was kept in a black ring. It was obtained by Xiao Yan and secretly absorbed Xiao Yan's fighting spirit for three years to awaken. After waking up, he became Xiao Yan's master.
Nalan Yanran	Zeng and Xiao Yan were engaged to each other before they were born. Later, Xiao Yan came to the house to terminate the engagement after he became a loser due to his inability to practice. After losing to Xiao Yan in the three-year contract, the Yunlan Sect was disbanded and went to other parts of the mainland to make a living.
Xun'er	Xiao Yan's childhood sweetheart was actually the eldest daughter of the ancient clan. When she was young, she was sent to the Xiao family by her father (the patriarch of the ancient clan) to secretly search for the Tuoshe Ancient Emperor Jade. He and Xiao Yan had a son named Xiao Lin.
Queen Medusa	The queen of the snake tribe in the Tagore Desert of the Jiama Empire. It was originally planned to use the Qinglian Earth Core Fire to attack Douzong, but after evolving into the Colorful Sky-Swallowing Python, the body was taken away by Xiao Yan. From then on, he coexisted with the Colorful Sky-Swallowing Python and stayed with Xiao Yan. Xiao Yan had an accidental relationship with the sequelae of the Qinglian Earth Heart Fire and the Fallen Heart Flame, so she and Xiao Yan had a daughter.
little Medical Fairy	One of Xiao Yan's confidants has a "poisonous body". He only needs to take poison to improve his cultivation, but the toxins will accumulate in his body. Later, under the guidance of Yao Lao, the Enan Poison Body was completely refined.
Tuoshegudi	Cultivated by flames, it devours all the strange fires on the continent. He is the last Dou Emperor in the Dou Qi Continent that can be found by the ancient clan. He left behind a Doudi Mansion in the void space. It is a rare well-preserved Dou Emperor relic. What is left in it is very likely to help people break through to the Dou Emperor level. The Tuoshe Ancient Emperor Jade is the key to unlocking the ruins, and there are eight pieces in total (divided up by the eight ancient tribes in a great war).
Xiao Xiao	The daughter of Xiao Yan and Cai Lin is very powerful. She was born into a strong Dou Sect. When Xiao Yan was promoted to Dou Emperor, she became an Eight-Star Dou Sage. Meet Muchen in "The Great Master".
Xiao Lin	The son of Xiao Yan and Xun'er is very powerful. Meet Muchen in "The Great Master".
Xiao Chen	Xiao Xuan's cousin and ancestor of Xiao Yan, nicknamed "Blood Ax Xiao Chen". After getting rid of the control of the Pure Lotus Demon Fire, he followed Xiao Yan back to Tianfu, in the middle stage of the Five Star Fighting Saint.
Xiao Zhan	Xiao Yan's father, who was once a great fighting master, dotes on Xiao Yan very much. He encouraged Xiao Yan a lot when Xiao Yan was considered a waste. He later disappeared and was confirmed to have been abducted by Yunshan in collusion with the Soul Palace and imprisoned in the Soul Palace. Realm was promoted to Douhuang by the Soul Clan using elixirs. Later, Xiao Yan exchanged it for the Xiao Clan's Tuoshe Ancient Emperor Jade.
Xiao Ding	The eldest brother Xiao Yan, the former head of the Motie mercenary group, was a vindictive man and had a deep relationship with Xiao Yan. He led the remaining members of the Xiao family to escape the pursuit of the Yun Lan Sect in the Jia Ma Empire but ended up with disabled legs and was later cured by Xiao Yan. good. Strength is fighting spirit.
Xiao Li	The second brother of Xiao Yan, the former leader of the Second Desert Iron Mercenary Regiment, belongs to the fighting spirit of thunder and has a deep relationship with Xiao Yan. Xiao Yan was dragged into the underground magma by the Fallen Heart Flame and then madly took revenge on the Blood Sect. By chance, he died by taking the Life-eating Pill. His strength skyrocketed to the Dou Wang level, but his vitality was seriously overdrawn. Later, he took the Qingming Shou Dan refined by Xiao Yan to temporarily relieve the backlash of the Shengsheng Dan. Break through the Fighting King, be promoted to the Fighting King, and break through the backlash of the Life-devouring Pill.
Xiao Lin	Xiao Yan's grandfather and Nalan Jie's best friend, together they made a marriage contract between Xiao Yan and Nalan Yanran, and their strength became the fighting king.
Xiao Ning	Xiao Yu's younger brother pursues Xiao Xun'er and has an unspeakable jealousy towards Xiao Yan. Defeated by Xiao Yan at the coming-of-age ceremony, he later reconciled with Xiao Yan due to family upheaval.
Xiao Mei	Xiao Yan's cousin, she liked Xiao Yan before Xiao Yan's three-year waste period. Her relationship with Xiao Yan was no less than that of Xiao Xun'er. After Xiao Yan became a waste, she alienated Xiao Yan. After Xiao Yan regained his reputation as a genius, he wanted to The relationship with Xiao Yan was restored, but because Xiao Yan had been hurt, the relationship with Xiao Yan has been difficult to make progress, and the relationship is average. Eventually the relationship was restored.
Xiao Yu	Xiao Ning's sister has a pair of round and slender legs. She had a grudge against Xiao Yan because she accidentally saw him taking a bath when she was a child. Later, she reconciled. In the final battle, her strength was Douzong, and in the finale, she was Douzong level. He has an admiration for Xiao Yan, but it is doomed to be fruitless because they are siblings.
Hai bodong	The Ice Emperor was one of the top ten strongest men in the previous generation of Jia Ma Empire. He was the supreme elder of the Miter family. He was aloof and arrogant in nature. He was extremely good at ice-type fighting energy and his strength was that of a five-star fighting emperor. He was once sealed by Queen Medusa, and his strength dropped to Dou Ling. Later, he met Xiao Yan and was released from the seal by Yao Lao's refining medicine, and his strength returned to a two-star Dou Huang. He helped Xiao Yan many times during the conflict with the Yunlan Sect and later rescued the survivors when the Soul Palace and the Yunlan Sect massacred the Xiao family. Before the crusade against Yunlan Sect, he took Xiao Yan's Purple Spirit Pill, and his strength increased from a five-star Dou Huang to one close to the peak of Dou Huang. He has a good relationship with Xiao Yan. Already a Douzong (comic: Xiao Yan and Yao Lao made his body look like a child. Novel: Yao Lao added Bone Spirit Cold Fire to his medicine.)
Yunshan	The former head of the Yunlan Sect, Master Yun Yun, spent many years in seclusion and became a strong Douzong expert with the help of the Soul Palace. He first appeared as a one-star Douzong and finally became a three-star Douzong. After Yun Ling was killed, he took action against Xiao Yan. He even sent people to cooperate with the Soul Palace to hunt down the Xiao family. Later, he was killed by Xiao Yan who came for revenge, and his soul was devoured and detonated by the protector of the Soul Palace. The body was collected by Xiao Yan as the main material for refining the body of Lord Medicine and later refined the body of Lord Tianhuo.
Ling Ying	Sent by the ancient clan as Xun'er's bodyguard, he once secretly protected Xiao Yan. He came out to help Xiao Yan during the Yunlan Sect war. He has a dark attribute and his debut strength is the Seven-Star Dou Huang.
Jia xingtian	Dou Huang's peak strength, half-stepped into Dou Zong, the guardian of the royal family of the Jia Ma Empire, with earth fighting spirit, once fought with Queen Medusa and escaped unscathed. (now Douzong)
Fa Ma	Dou Huang's strength is that he is an old antique of the same age as Hai Bodong and Jiaxing Tian. He is a fifth-grade peak alchemist (should be promoted to a seventh-grade alchemist). He is second only to Furukawa among the alchemists of the Jiama Empire. President of the Pharmacists Association. When he was young, he received the guidance of Yao Lao while traveling in the mainland, and now he is the master of Yanmeng Dan Hall. (now Douzong)
Gu He	One of the ten most powerful men in the Garma Empire, a six-star Dou Wang, a sixth-grade alchemist, and the number one person in the Garma Empire's alchemy world. He looks gentle and gentle, but his strength cannot be underestimated. He once went deep into the desert snake man's territory to find strange things. The Fire Rebellion was captured by Xiao Yan. Xiao Yan, who was defeated by the three-star Dou King in Yunlan Mountain when he was defeated by the peak Dou King, had an older brother named Gu Te. He has formed an alliance with Xiao Yan and is now the deputy master of Yanmeng Dan Hall (currently a seventh-grade peak alchemist).
Liu Ling	A disciple of Gu He, a fourth-grade alchemist, and the pursuer of Nalan Yanran. He once met Xiao Yan in the alchemist competition and lost to Xiao Yan. Later, he was invited by Xiao Yan to join the Yan League with Furukawa.
Ruolin	Mentor of Xiao Yan, Xun'er and Xiao Yu at Canaan College. He first appeared at the five-star fighting master level.
Wu Hao	A member of the Canaan College Law Enforcement Team, he practices a bloody fighting spirit and is bloodthirsty. He is convinced of Xiao Yan's strength and vows to defeat Xiao Yan one day. He is also an upright person. After entering the inner courtyard, he had a good relationship with Xiao Yan, Xun'er, and the founder of "Panmen". Now he is the dean of Canaan College. In the final battle, he is a one-star Dou Zun. (One of the protagonist's friends)
Lin Xiuya	The second master on the inner court rankings, his strength is at the peak of Dou Ling, he has half a foot in Dou Wang, and he has a good impression of Xiao Yan. He was defeated by Xun'er within ten rounds in the exhibition match after the Strong Ranking Competition, and then followed Xiao Yan to the Yunlan Sect for revenge. (One of the protagonist's friends, his strength should be Dou Zun level in the future)
Hujia	The granddaughter of the vice-president of the outer courtyard of Canaan College, a sexually oriented woman, a stunning beauty, outstanding talent, and a maverick personality. She is a lesbian and covets Xun'er. After entering the inner courtyard, she lives with Xiao Yan, Xun'er and Wu Hao. Create "Panmen" and have a good relationship. He is the dean of Canaan College. The decisive battle was the peak of Douzong. (One of the protagonist's friends)
Han Yue	A former student of the inner courtyard, with a rather cool silver dress and long dazzling silver hair, he has considerable reputation and strength in the inner courtyard. He once met Xiao Yan for the first time in front of the Tianfen Qi Training Tower, and later inspired his violent bloodline The Snow Demon Sky Ape's subordinate was rescued by Xiao Yan, who had just cultivated Three Thousand Thunderbolts, and had a good impression of Xiao Yan. The eldest daughter of the Han family in Zhongzhou, her younger sister Han Xue, is a powerful fighter. Xiao Yan once helped the Han family through a difficult time.
Liu Qing	The third master on the inner court's strong list, his strength is similar to Lin Xiuya's. Due to a grudge between her cousin Liu Fei and Xiao Yan, they fought to the death with Xiao Yan in the strong ranking competition until the end, and they were tied for tenth on the strong ranking. He once followed Xiao Yan to Yunlan Sect for revenge. He is the head of the Liu family in Zhongzhou, and his strength is the Seven-Star Dou Huang (now Dou Zun). After Xiao Yan solved the family troubles for him, he felt grateful to Xiao Yan. Now the head of the Liu family. (One of the protagonist's friends)
Lin Yan	Among the top five masters in the inner court, Xiao Yan once expelled the fire poison for him in exchange for the Green Wood Immortal Vine, and has now become Xiao Yan's follower and friend. He once followed Xiao Yan to Yunlan Sect for revenge, and later met Xiao Yan at the Sifang Pavilion Conference. With the strength of four-star Dou Huang (now Dou Zun), he went to the Dan Realm with Xiao Yan. Now he is staying at Liu's house. (One of the protagonist's friends)
Han Feng	Nicknamed "Medicine Emperor", he is a rebellious disciple of Yao Lao and a sixth-grade peak alchemist. His first appearance is at the peak of Dou Huang. He possesses the strange fire "Sea Heart Flame" and can materialize the strange fire. In order to seize the "Burning Technique" and " Bone Spirit Cold Fire" and colluded with the Soul Palace to kill the master. During the outbreak of "Falling Heart Flame", a large number of strong men were gathered to invade the inner courtyard, but Xiao Yan was seriously injured and repelled. Later, a black alliance was formed in the Black Corner Domain to confront Canaan College. A year later, his strength increased to half a foot and he entered the Douzong. After his second fight with Xiao Yan and his physical death, his soul was sucked away by the Soul Palace, and his wealth was acquired by Xiao Yan. Later, he donated his Hai Xinyan to The Lord of the Soul Palace got a Dou Zong body and integrated his soul into it, so he was promoted to Dou Zong (around four stars). Now that he has been killed again and his soul has been captured, Hai Xinyan is owned by the Soul Palace (now owned by Xiao Yan).
Hugan	The vice president of the outer courtyard of Canaan College, the grandfather of the college enchantress Hu Jia, a peak Dou Huang warrior, admired Xiao Yan very much. (After that, the strength should be Douzong level)
Ye Xinlan	A fifth-grade alchemist, a member of the Ye family, one of the five major families in the Zhongzhou Dan Region, but the family has gradually declined and lost his position as the elder of the Alchemy Pagoda. Xiao Yan was invited to help his family re-enter the Danta in exchange for the news of Sanqianyanyanhuo. He went to Central Continent with Xiao Yan, and was separated from Xiao Yan when he encountered a space storm in a space wormhole. When he met Xiao Yan, he helped Xiao Yan rescue the little fairy doctor and return to the Ye family. (His father asked Xiao Yan to compete on behalf of the Ye family as Xinlan's fiancé. Xiao Yan refused this identity and later competed on behalf of the Ye family as a foreign aid)
Su Qian	The great elder of the inner courtyard of Canaan Academy has a strength of about two-star Douzun in the appearance. In the finale, his strength should be around two-star to three-star Douzun (the book mentions that Wu Hao's strength is one-star Douzun, and Su Qian is slightly stronger than Wu Hao). Xiao Yan admired it very much.
Two old men of gold and silver	A pair of twin brothers, both at the peak of Dou Huang's strength, claimed that they could fight Dou Zong together. They were invited by Han Feng to participate in the invasion of the inner courtyard by the powerful men from the Black Angle Domain during the outbreak of "Fallen Heart Flame", and later joined the Black Alliance to continue. He is an enemy of Canaan Academy and has fought against Su Qian many times, but he is extremely afraid of Medusa.
Lingquan	The leader of the ancient Black Annihilation Army took Xiao Xun away from the inner courtyard of Canaan College and humiliated Xiao Yan as a child. Later, he once again invited Xiao Xun back to the Ye family in Zhongzhou, where he was a five-star Douzong when he was a child, and humiliated Xiao Yan again, but was easily defeated by Xiao Yan. His fighting spirit is empty and not cultivated by himself. He has a crush on Xiao Xun'er, but he is a small person and is not worthy of being called Xiao Yan's love rival. He was defeated by Xiao Yan and was later defeated by Xiao Yan in the ancient holy city. His strength is now a one-star Dou Zun, will no longer be the protagonist's opponent in the future.
Mo Cheng	The great elder of the Mo family in the northeastern part of the Jia Ma Empire, a powerful five-star fighting spirit, kidnapped Qing Lin in order to obtain the "Blue Snake Three Flower Pupils". He was killed by Xiao Yan because he refused to hand over Qing Lin.
Nalanjie	The powerful Dou Wang, Nalan Yanran's grandfather, Xiao Yan once expelled the "branded poison" for him in exchange for the "Seven Fantasy Green Spirit Saliva". During the Yunlan Sect war, he broke his promise and stood aside, which further cooled the relationship between the Nalan family and Xiao Yan.
Miter Tengshan	The eldest elder of the Miter family, a strong King of Fighters, had a good relationship with Xiao Yan under the promotion of Hai Bodong and others.
Moya	The young master of the Black Emperor Sect, a six-star fighting emperor, admired the Little Medical Fairy, but was secretly poisoned by Zi Yan and the Little Medical Fairy when they got close.
Mang Tianchi	The dean of the inner courtyard of Canaan College and the elder of the Thunder Clan. He is a semi-saint strongman at the end. He likes to travel around. He met Xiao Yan in the Void Thunder Pond in Zhongzhou, appeared in the Ancient Clan, and helped Xiao Yan.
old devil	The founder of Demon Flame Valley, the Seven Star Dou Sect, with ice attributes, has been killed by Bai Lao. The body was originally planned to be used as Yao Lao's body, but was later used by Xiao Yan to refine the Heavenly Demon Puppet.
Yao Tianhuo	Lord Tianhuo, the former master of Fallen Heart Flame, a powerful Five-Star Dou Zun. He is old and immortal, well-informed, and has answered Xiao Yan's problems many times. After merging with Xiao Yan's refined body, his strength returned to a one-star Dou Zun, accompanying Xiao Yan. Later, Xiao Yan used elixirs to restore part of his strength to the Three-Star Dou Zun, and accompanied Xiao Yan to the Dead Souls Mountains to rescue Yao Lao. When Xiao Yan went to Huazong to deal with Yun Yun, he stayed in Xingyun Pavilion. When Gulongdao returned to Xingyun Pavilion, he had returned to his peak with the help of Yao Lao. Accompany Xiao Yan to the ancient world. He is the guest elder of Xingyun Pavilion. Later, when his strength reached the peak of Dou Zun, Xiao Yan secretly vowed to help him reach semi-saint status.
Bailie, Qianmu	Known as the "Qianbai Erlao", they are all half powerful when they appear. At the end, they are all seven-star warriors and the guardians of Canaan Academy.
Feng Qinger	At the peak of the third-level Dou Zun, he is a closed disciple of Venerable Lei, the master of Fenglei Pavilion. His real body is the alien beast Sky Demon Phoenix. He has taken the initiative to provoke troubles many times, which led to a lot of enmity between him and Xiao Yan. He was defeated by Xiao Yan in the Sifang Pavilion Conference, and the Skeleton Mountains In the ancient ruins, they clashed with Xiao Yan and others to compete for the original fruit of dragon and phoenix. Later, he fought against Xiao Yan at the Ancient Domain Terrace and was knocked unconscious by Xiao Yan.
Mu Qingluan	A young master of the Xingyun Pavilion, the incarnation of the Tianluan clan of Warcraft, Yao Lao is a disciple of Lord Feng, and has a good impression of Xiao Yan. After coming out of the Tianshan Blood Pool, I had already half-stepped into Douzong. The strength is Douzong.
Gu Ling	Feng Zunzhe, whose real name is Feng Xian, is Yao Chen's life-and-death friend. His appearance is Four-Star Dou Zun. He is the deputy master of Xingyun Pavilion and the actual person in charge. After Xiao Yan's identity was exposed at the Sifang Pavilion conference, he came forward to help Xiao because of Yao Chen. Yan retreated, and then went to the Dead Souls Mountains with Xiao Yan to rescue Yao Chen.
Sword Master	The master of Wanjiang Pavilion and Tang Ying's teacher. The strength is Samsung Dou Zun.
Lord Huangquan	The master of Huangquan Pavilion, Wang Chen's teacher, was once defeated by Master Feng within a hundred rounds and harbored resentment. He is cruel and domineering by nature and will do whatever it takes to achieve his goals. The strength is about two-star Dou Zun.
Lord Lei	The master of Fenglei Pavilion, Samsung Douzun, Feng Qing'er's teacher, has quite a grudge against Xiao Yan and Xingyun Pavilion. Because of Feng Qing'er, he has a close relationship with the Sky Demon Phoenix Clan. The Dragon and Phoenix Origin Fruit, an ancient ruin in the Skeleton Mountains One of the participants in the battle. He had been slapped to death by Xiao Yan.
Wang Chen	The disciple of Venerable Huang Quan was cruel and ruthless. Lin Yan almost died in his hands, but was saved by Xiao Yan. Half a foot stepped into Douzong.
Tang Zhen	The owner of the Burning Flame Valley, a powerful Five-Star Dou Zun, controls the "Nine Dragons Thunder Gang Fire". He once cooperated with Xiao Yan to refine the "Fire Buddha Pill" and admired Xiao Yan very much.
Tang Huoer	The daughter of Tang Zhen, the owner of the Burning Flame Valley, has a good attitude towards Xiao Yan because Xiao Yan refined the "Fire Buddha Pill" to save his life. She is a strong figure in Douzong.
Qinghai	The Soul Lord of the Soul Palace, a powerful two-star Dou Zun, rushed to rescue the bird protector in the middle of a mission and intended to capture Xiao Yan. The soul was collected by Xiao Yan.
Cao Xiu	The young master of the Cao family, a seventh-grade intermediate alchemist, is one of the three pillars of the younger generation of the Cao family.
Mu Gu	Grade-eight medicine refiner, three-star peak Dou Zun, a respected elder of the Soul Temple, and someone who was highly valued by the temple master. He was once a disciple of Han Shan Shan, along with Yao Chen. However, he was expelled by Han Shan Shan due to his practice of using living humans for medicine refining. He once fought with Yao Chen in the space of light and shadow to compete for the Burning Technique. He provoked Han Feng to frame Yao Chen, repeatedly pursued Xiao Yan to seize the heterogeneous fire and the Burning Technique, but failed. Commissioned by the temple master, he plotted to seize the "Three Thousand Blazing Flames" during the Pill Conference. He originally possessed the Sea Heart Flame, which was sacrificed by Han Feng (now taken by Xiao Yan), but he was killed by Xiao Yan.
Xuan Kongzi	President of the Dante Tower's Medicine Refiner Association, an old friend of Yao Chen, one of the three giants of the Dante Tower, and a peak Grade-eight medicine refiner (or an initial Grade-nine medicine refiner). He secretly helped Xiao Yan to fend off the old man Mu Gu before the Dante Convention. His strength is that of an initial semi-sage.
Star-catching old ghost	The Heavenly Elder of the Soul Temple branch in the Perishing Souls Mountain where Yao Chen was imprisoned, possesses a peak-level power of five-star Dou Zun. He lost an arm after being gravely injured by Xiao Yan's destructive fire lotus during the battle to rescue Yao Chen in the Perishing Souls Mountain. Later, he failed to seize the Dou Sheng skeleton from Xiao Yan during their clash at the ancient ruins in the Bones Mountain Range. In the subsequent massacre of the Xingyun Pavilion, he was killed by Xiao Yan using the Great Heavenly Creation Palm.
Black and white Tianzun	Soul Palace Tianzun, whose strength is at the peak of Five-Star Dou Zun, is slightly stronger than Star Reaching Tianzun. At the end of the battle in the Dead Soul Mountain Range, he appeared to pursue Xiao Yan, Feng Zunzhe and others but failed. After the bloodbath of Xingyun Pavilion incident, he was promoted to Semi-Saint. The drug-lao was seriously injured.
Lord Iron Sword	Erxing Douzun, in order to repay Yao Chen's great kindness, participated in the battle of the Soul Mountain to rescue Yao Chen. During the evacuation, he tried to self-destruct to buy time to stop the enemy, but was rescued by Zhu Li, the third elder of the Taixu Ancient Dragon Clan, to Gu Long Island.
Huangxuan	Five-star Dou Zun, the elder of the Sky Demon Phoenix Clan, competed with Xiao Yan, Zi Yan and others for the origin of the dragon and phoenix in the ancient ruins of the Skeleton Mountains, but failed.
Black Qing	An elder of the Taixu Ancient Dragon Clan, he helped Xiao Yan and others get out of trouble in the ancient ruins of the Skeleton Mountains, and rescued Xiao Yan from Jiutian Zun and others. His strength was Eight-Star Dou Zun, and he was very friendly to Xiao Yan. The actual strength is the peak of Rank 8 Douzun.
Granny Hua	Formerly known as Hua Yu, the former head of Hua Zong, Dou Zun was at the peak of his strength. He died and passed on his lifelong fighting spirit to Yun Yun.
Hua Jin	The adopted daughter of Granny Hua and the acting head of Hua Zong, she is a four-star Dou Zun. She is extremely jealous of Yun Yun. She has been attacked by Hei Qing and her life and death are unknown.
Demon flower and evil king	The male companion of the acting leader of the Hua Zong, a six-star Dou Zun, who coveted Yun Yun's beauty, had been killed by Xiao Yan who was behind the Vajra Glaze.
Holy One of Creation	He is dead, a strong fighting saint in the ancient ruins of the Skeleton Mountains. He died for unknown reasons, and his bones were divided between Star Reacher, Xiao Yan and others. The self-created heaven-level fighting skill "Great Heaven's Fortune Palm (low-level heaven-level fighting skill)" was left on three ribs and was obtained by Xiao Yan.
Huo Zhi	A member of the Yan Clan, he possesses the eighth-ranked Red Lotus Karmic Fire.
Gu Yao	The Shura Dutong of the ancient tribe's Black Annihilation Army, with the strength of the Eight-Star Dou Zun, challenged Xiao Yan at the ancient tribe's coming-of-age ceremony, but was defeated by Xiao Yan. Then there is a tendency to reconcile with it.
Gu Qingyang	The leader of the ancient Black Annihilation Army, he was a nine-star Dou Zun strongman when he appeared on the stage, and later broke through to the Dou Saint.
Gu Yuan	The patriarch of the ancient tribe and Xun'er's father, he was at the peak of his strength as a Dou Sheng, and later broke through to become a Dou Emperor (Five Emperors Break Through the Sky).
Yao Xingji	A member of the Medicine Clan, an intermediate-level eighth-grade alchemist, nicknamed "Human Medicine Son", he inherited the "Nine Nether Wind Flame" and is hostile to Xiao Yan.
Youquan	Female, a disciple of Xingyun Pavilion, reached the Dou Wang level at the age of 17. Her talent was noticed by Yao Lao, who asked Xiao Yan to accept her as his registered disciple. She also has a crush on Xiao Yan.
Soul Jade	The specific strength is unknown, but it should be above the peak of the eighth level Dou Zun. The owner of the Soul Clan's divine bloodline. On the surface, he is gentle, but in fact, he is cruel and ruthless. He used the power of others to break through the beast tide, causing nine-tenths of the team that attacked the beast tide to be killed or injured. He was seriously injured by Xiao Yan at the Bodhi Ancient Tree.
Jiufeng	His specific strength is at the peak of the Ninth Transformation Dou Zun. He is the next leader of the Heavenly Phoenix Clan. He is hostile to Xiao Yan.
Fire Cloud Ancestor	The ancestor of Fenyan Valley, the former valley master, has the strength of a one-star Dou Sheng in the middle stage.
Yao Ming	The leader of the Nine Netherworld Python clan. He was attacked by his own brother, suffered severe injuries, and was sealed at the bottom of the Yellow Spring Pool. He was later rescued by Xiao Yan. He has killed his own brother and regained the position of clan leader. His strength is the late two-star Dou Sheng.
Soul Palace Master	Hun Mie Sheng, when he first appeared, his strength was at the early stage of the five-star Douluo, and he possessed the Void Swallowing Flame. In the great battle with the Tianfu Alliance, his strength was at the middle stage of the five-star Douluo, and he was killed by Xiao Yan. His broken soul was taken away by Hun Qianmo. After his resurrection, his strength reached the seven-star Douluo.
Danta Patriarch	Green Ox Shepherd Boy, early stage of six-star Douluo.
The Pure Lotus Demon Saint	Half-Emperor, once possessed the Pure Lotus Demon Fire. At the end of his life, he failed to seal the Pure Lotus Demon Fire and was devoured by it. His inheritance was obtained by Xiao Yan, and he was known as the person who was closest to the Dou Emperor in that era.
Hung Feng	The Soul Clan's young patriarch, a two-star Douluo in the late stage.
Northern Dragon King	The Dragon King of Beilong Island, who has one foot in the realm of four-star Douluo, absorbed the blood of the West Dragon King and the South Dragon King to reach the realm of six-star Douluo. He was killed by Xiao Yan's destructive fire body, and was refined by Xiao Yan into the Heavenly Demon Kui with the strength of five-star Douluo. After absorbing the black magic thunder, he can rival the six-star Douluo. The protagonist is named the King of the North.
Yao Wan Gui	The elder of the Medicine Clan is in charge of punishment and is in the early stage of a four-star Douluo.
Mu Snake	A two-star fighter, the leader of the Wolf Head Mercenary Group in Qingshan Town. He had a grudge against Xiao Yan because of Zi Muli, and later chased Xiao Yan into the depths of the Warcraft Mountains, and was later killed by Xiao Yan.
Muli	The son of Mu Snake, with a strength of seven-star fighter. He became enemies with Xiao Yixian and Xiao Yan because of the treasure left in the cave, and was later killed by Xiao Yan.
Luobu	The leader of the Sand Mercenary Group in Shimo City, he is a great fighter. He had a grudge against Xiao Yan because of the Mo Clan. He was shocked by Xiao Yan's strength borrowed from Yao Lao and was forced to disband the Sand Mercenary Group and then join the Desert Iron Mercenary Group.
Yanli	The vice president of the Izumo Empire Alchemist Guild. In order to get enough votes, he used elixirs to disguise himself and participated in the Gama Empire Alchemist Conference. He was defeated by Yan Xiao and was killed by Hai Bodong, Jia Lao and Fama when he tried to escape.
Musang	The city guard of Daling City, a member of the Yunlan Sect, issued a wanted order in the city to curry favor with the Yunlan Sect when Xiao Yan fled to the Jiama Empire.
Monra	Fighting Master, son of Meng Li, deputy commander of the Ghost Pass. When Xiao Yan fled to the Jia Ma Empire, he saw through Xiao Yan's disguise at the Ghost Pass and was severely injured by Xiao Yan's punch.
Mengli	Dou Ling, a member of the Yun Lan Sect, the deputy commander of the Ghost Gate, tried to stop Xiao Yan when he was passing the gate, but was defeated by Xiao Yan controlled by Yao Lao
Mutie	A Dou Wang strongman, a member of the Mu family, one of the three major families in the Jia Ma Empire, and the commander of the Ghost Pass, appeared to stop Meng Li from arresting Xiao Yan.
Yuan Yi	The leader of the Six Gates, a long-established force in the Black Horn Region, and one of the top ten masters on the Black List.
Fan Ling	The young leader of the Black Horn Blood Sect, a powerful Dou Ling. When Xiao Yan was bidding for the map fragments, he bid with him because he was suspicious. Later, when he was trying to kill Morhan in the Black Skull Tomb, he was killed by Xiao Yan who was waiting behind.
Mo'er han	The Black Skull Tomb Man, who deliberately raised the price at the Black Horn Auction House and was hated by Fan Ling, was later ambushed and killed by Fan Ling.
Fan Lao	A four-star Dou Huang, the leader of the Black Horned Blood Sect, he once ambushed Elder Qing of the Sky Snake House to seize the Yin-Yang Mysterious Dragon Pill. He was later killed by Xiao Yan.
Su Xiao	One of the leaders of the old student hunting team that Xiao Yan met before entering the inner courtyard, and was defeated by Xiao Yan
Leng bai	One of the leaders of the old students' hunting team that Xiao Yan met before entering the inner courtyard. He was defeated by Bai Shan. Later, Bai Shan was shot by Bai Shan because he was jealous of Xiao Yan being respected and admired by the new students.
Xiuyan	One of the leaders of the old student hunting team Xiao Yan met before entering the inner courtyard, and was defeated by Wu Hao
Shatie	The captain of the Black Evil Team of the Old Student Hunting Team is about to enter the Douling Spirit. He has a gold Dou Qi and wanted to catch the bird from behind. In the end, he was besieged by Xiao Yan, Xun'er and Hu Jia and automatically admitted defeat.
Luo Hou	The captain of the White Evil Team of the Old Student Hunting Team, a Douling strongman, was besieged by Xiao Yan, Xun'er, Wu Hao, and Hu Jia with ease. Later, when Xiao Yan was defeated by the small fire lotus, he was saved by Elder Su
Fu Ao	A member of the Bai Gang in the inner courtyard of Canaan College. A three-star Douling. When he followed Bai Shan to Panmen to cause trouble, he was defeated by Xiao Yan.
Bai Cheng	The leader of the Bai Gang in the inner courtyard of Canaan College, Bai Shan's cousin, a six-star Douling, ranked 34th on the inner courtyard strong list
Liu Fei	Liu Qing's cousin, she had a grudge against Xiao Yan because Xiao Yan accidentally occupied her designated training room. After being punished by Elder Liu, she hated Xiao Yan and caused her pursuers and brother Liu Qing to deal with Xiao Yan. After Xiao Yan tied with Liu Qing, she was afraid of his strength and stopped provoking Xiao Yan. After Xiao Yan saved the inner courtyard, she admired him and her attitude improved.
Rainer	In the Tianfen Refining Tower, in order to please Liu Fei, he made enemies with Xiao Yan. He was a four-star Dou Ling and was almost seriously injured by Xiao Yan's fire lotus, but was burned into a big bald head. Elder Liu arrived in time to resolve the problem, and was then punished.
Han Xian	The leader of the inner courtyard medicine gang, possesses the phantom gold fire produced by the hatching of the seventh-level phantom fire scorpion dragon hand cub. He is a fourth-grade alchemist. He had a rift with Panmen because of the sale of elixirs. In the alchemy competition with Xiao Yan, he was worried that he could not refine the fifth-grade medicine prescription given by Elder He, so he retreated and refined a semi-finished product and lost to Xiao Yan.
Lan Yan	The strong man who ranked in the middle of the list was a young man in blue clothes, about 24 or 25 years old. He met Liu Qing in the first round of the Strong List Competition and was defeated in one move.
Yao Sheng	He is ranked fifteenth on the Strong List. Initially, he had a grudge against Xiao Yan because of his admiration for Liu Fei. After a fight, he was stopped by Liu Qing. Later, he met Xiao Yan in the second round of the Strong List Competition and was defeated.
Qian Mo	At the peak of Dou Ling, he ranks eighth on the Strong List. In the inner courtyard, Qian Mo has a nickname, Qian Shihuan. He is quite fat, and cultivates wind-attributed Dou Qi. When competing for the top ten in the Strong List competition, he met Yan Hao and admitted defeat after failing to break his defense.
Qin Town	He ranked sixth on the Strong List. When he was competing for the top ten in the Strong List competition, he met Zi Yan and said that he felt sick to his stomach and gave up the competition.
Tie Wu	The leader of the Mad Lion Gang, known as the Mad Lion Tiewu, a Douhuang powerhouse. When he, Su Mei and the Yin Bone Old Man were threatening the Xiao Clan, he was frightened by the arrival of Xiao Yan and Medusa, and was coerced and induced by Xiao Yan to cooperate. He returned to the Jia Ma Empire with Xiao Yan to attack the Yun Lan Sect, and was later invited to participate in the battle to kill Han Feng.
Su Mei	When the leader of Luosha Sect, a Douhuang strongman, and Tiewu and Yin Gu Old Man were threatening Xiao Sect, they were frightened by the arrival of Xiao Yan and Medusa, and were coerced and induced by Xiao Yan to cooperate. They returned to the Jia Ma Empire with Xiao Yan to attack the Yunlan Sect, and were later invited to participate in the battle to kill Han Feng.
Yin bone old man	The leader of the Tianyin Sect, a Douhuang powerhouse, was intimidated by Xiao Yan and Medusa when he, Su Mei, and Tiewu threatened the Xiao Clan. He was coerced and induced by Xiao Yan to cooperate and returned to the Jia Ma Empire with Xiao Yan to attack the Yunlan Sect. Later, he was invited to participate in the battle to kill Han Feng.
Yunfan	An elder of the Yunlan Sect with the strength of a Dou Wang. When Xiao Yan returned to the Yunlan Sect three years later, he encountered Meng Li who wanted to seize the military power of Zhengui Pass. When he threatened Mu Tie, he was killed by Xiao Yan.
Wild Geese Falling from the Sky	A two-star Dou Zong, the leader of the Golden Goose Sect of the Luoyan Empire. When the three empires attacked the Jia Ma Empire, he and the three elders of Mulan besieged Queen Medusa. Xiao Yan, who arrived, pinned down the three elders of Mulan but was later killed by Queen Medusa who sneaked in.
Mulan Three Elders	All three were at the peak of Dou Huang and practiced the Three Beasts Savage Art. Their combined attack was comparable to that of Dou Zong. When the three empires attacked the Gama Empire, they besieged Queen Medusa together with Yan Luotian. One of them was injured by Xiao Yan who arrived. Later, Xiao Yan sneaked in and killed one of them, and the remaining two were killed by Medusa.
Xiebiyan	A four-star Dou Zong peak of the Wanxie Sect of the Izumo Empire. He was defeated after fighting with Xiao Yixian and released a demonic poison that invaded Xiao Yan's body. He was then killed by the angry Medusa.
Wu Ya	The former leader of the Wutianfu in the Izumo Empire, he surrendered and joined the Poison Sect when they were besieged by the Poison Sect led by Xiao Yixian. He was at the peak of the Douhuang level but was actually a spy of the Wanxie Sect. When Xiao Yixian attacked the Wanxie Sect, he led his people to rebel. He launched a sneak attack on Xiao Yixian but was stopped by Xiao Yan, and was later killed by Xiao Yan.
Iron Guardian	A human-level guardian of the Soul Palace, a four-star Dou Zong, he appeared in the decisive battle between the Poison Sect of the Izumo Empire and the Ten Thousand Scorpion Sect. He was entangled by Medusa, and after taking the Emperor Seal from Dou Huang Xiao Yan, his strength was weakened and he was captured alive by Medusa. He was handed over to Xiao Yan, and his soul was later used to refine the Earth Demon Puppet.
Wu ying	Dharma Protector Wu, an earth-level Dharma Protector of the Soul Palace, an eight-star Dou Zong, appeared when Xiao Yan destroyed the Yunlan Sect. Yao Lao fought hard with him but was captured after being defeated. When he wanted to capture and kill Xiao Yan, he was stopped by Medusa. Later, he retreated because of Medusa's strength and was later captured by Xiao Yan in the encirclement and suppression of the Ye family.
Xie Zhen	The fourth elder of the Demon Flame Valley, known as the Eagle Claw Old Man by the people of the Black Horn Region, was approximately six-star Dou Huang in strength.He led people to besiege the Canaan Academy led by Wu Hao when they were training freshmen, and seriously injured Wu Hao. He was frightened away by Xiao Yan, and was accidentally poisoned to death by the Little Medical Fairy while escaping.
Han Chi	The head of the Zhongzhou Han family, the father of Han Xue and Han Yue, and a Douhuang powerhouse.
Han Xue	Han Yue's sister, with the strength of a Dou Wang. After Xiao Yan was injured and arrived in Zhongzhou, she met Han Xue's convoy and was rescued by her. She fell in love with Xiao Yan because she was rescued by Xiao Yan many times, and once risked her life to block an attack on Xiao Yan.
Han Tian	The Han family of Tianbei City, the second uncle of Han Yue and Han Xue, an eight-star Dou Huang with wind attribute.
Shen Yun	One of the four elders of the North Pavilion of Fenglei Pavilion, a four-star Dou Zong. When Xiao Yan was helping the Han family fight Hong Chen, he was recognized by him as the Three Thousand Thunders. He immediately identified Xiao Yan as a thief who stole the martial arts and was killed by Xiao Yan.
Hong Chen	A member of Zhongzhou Hong Family, a five-star Dou Huang, he lost to the Han Family's foreign aid Xiao Yan in a gambling battle with the Han Family. After that, his sneak attack failed and he was beaten to a point where he was left with only a tiny bit of strength
Luo Cheng	The ancestor of the Luo family in Tianya City, a five-star Dou Zong.
Han Chong	A deacon of the Han family in Tianbei City, at the peak of Dou Ling.
Demonic snake Xia Mang	A sixth-level magical beast, he was severely injured by Xiao Yan because he was extremely lustful and attacked Han Xue.
Fei Tian	He is called Tian Lei Zi, the leader of the Feng Lei Bei Pavilion. He was an eight-star Dou Zong when he first appeared. When he married Xiao Yan, hioneclone was destroyed by Xiao Yan, causing Xiao Yan to learn his clone technique by accident. Later, he reached the peak of Dou Zong and became hostile to Xiao Yan.
Wolf King	A seventh-level magical beast, equivalent to a two-star Dou Zong, it fought with Xiao Yan because it had no berries.
Jinshi	A seventh-rank magical beast, the leader of the Gold-Eating Rat Clan, they became friends because Xiao Yan cured him of his fire poison.
White Eagle	The most outstanding young alchemist of the Bai family among the five major families in Danta.
Cao Ying	The most outstanding young alchemist of the Cao family, one of the five major families in Danta, is known as the "witch girl". Her alchemy skills are no less than Xiao Yan. She refined three-color elixirs in the Alchemy Competition but unfortunately lost to Xiao Yan and Old Man Mu Gu, who had greatly improved their strength. She fell in love with Xiao Yan because Xiao Yan saved her life.
Cao Dan	One of the three most outstanding alchemists of the younger generation of the Cao family, one of the five major families in Danta. He was defeated by Xiao Yan in a fire control competition.
Dan Chen	The most outstanding young generation of alchemists among the five major families of Danta, the Dan family.
Dan Xuan	One of the most outstanding young alchemists in the Dan family, one of the five major families in Danta.
Qiu Ji	The most outstanding young alchemist of the Qiu family among the five major families in Danta.
Hun Xuzi	

=== Tianding Ranking ===
Similar to the Different Fire Ranking, there is also a Heavenly Cauldron Ranking in the alchemy world. As the name suggests, the list of outstanding medicine cauldrons is recorded in the Heavenly Cauldron Ranking.There are thirteen cauldrons in the Heavenly Cauldron Ranking, and each of them has magical powers that attract countless alchemists.

The pill cauldrons that appear in the novels: the Black Demon Cauldron, the Ten Thousand Beasts Cauldron, and the Mountain Melting Cauldron, the rest of the novels are not mentioned, and the other ones circulating on the internet are all cottage versions. The seventh-ranked Holy Yew Cauldron appears in The Legend of Medicine Old Man.

Medicine cauldron name	Tianding Ranking	introduce
Black Demon Cauldron	Ranking: 7th Owner: Obtained by a master. First appearance: The Legend of Yao Lao, Volume 4, The First Alchemist, Chapter 6, The Transformation of the Black Demon Cauldron	The light and shadow space is produced by a very small part of the origin of light in the world, which is opposite to the Black Demon Cauldron.
Ten Thousand Beasts Cauldron	Ranking: 8th (the only one with a clear ranking) Owner: Yao Chen (Yao Lao) First appearance: Chapter 239 Hidden in the Deep. Yao Lao used it to refine the sixth-grade elixir "Po Evil Pill" in his soul state.	The black medicine cauldron is quite sturdy in size, with a calm aura lingering all over its body. Lifelike flame totems are painted on the surface of the cauldron. As the cauldron slowly rotates, these flame totems are actually like real objects. Invisibly, a faint flame energy is condensing around the cauldron.
Mountain Melting Cauldron	Ranking: Unknown (not mentioned in the novel) Owner: Xiao Yan (the trophy obtained by Xiao Yan after killing Han Feng) First appearance: Chapter 627, Pill Auction. The name was unknown at that time. In Chapter 633, Materials for Refining the Body, Yao Lao first mentioned its name.	The medicine cauldron is quite large, and is covered with all kinds of strange patterns all over. On the body of the cauldron, there are lifelike images of ferocious beasts carved. When their ferocious mouths are wide open, if you listen carefully, you can seem to hear faintly some strange roars coming from the medicine cauldron. All these strange phenomena show the extraordinary nature of this red medicine cauldron.
Holy Yaoding	Ranking: Unknown (not mentioned in the novel) Owner: Tang Zhen (Master of Burning Flame Valley) First appearance: Chapter 1028: Fire Bodhisattva Pill. It was used by Xiao Yan, Tang Zhen, and Master Huan when they worked together to refine the seventh-grade high-level pill "Fire Bodhisattva Pill".	A huge medicine cauldron that is about ten feet in size. The entire cauldron is fiery red, and on the round wall of the cauldron, there are patterns like a volcanic eruption. At first glance, a violent aura suddenly comes towards you.

== Game ==
=== "Fights Break Spheres: The Strange Fire Reignited" ===
Fights Break Spheres: The Strange Fire Reignited is a large-scale immersive 3D MMORPG crafted and published by China's Shenzhen Tencent Computer Systems Limited.Developed by the TiMi Studio Group . The game was officially launched on January 10, 2020, for public beta testing.

Game Support Platform : Android, IOS, PC Emulator

The game received very hot attention upon its release, with the same plot as the novel, and has many followers in China's Baidu posting forums who actively discuss the game's content. It has also received high ratings for its gaming experience in the Apple Store.

== Reception ==
Wang Gaixia, associate professor at the School of Foreign Languages of Neijiang Normal University, wrote an article stating that in the novel Fights Break the Sky (English version), Xiao Yan is the main character and uses a "growing brave" as his character image, which is in line with the expectations of readers at home and abroad. The structure of the novel is "Dou Qi Continent" which is a combination of Chinese and Western cultures. Its English version is not only conducive to the spread of Chinese culture but also conducive to the development of Chinese culture represented by popular literature represented by online novels.
