= MTV Video Music Award Japan for Best Rock Video =

Annual Japanese music award

Best Rock Video (最優秀ロックビデオ賞)

== Results ==
The following table displays the nominees and the winners in bold print with a yellow background.

=== 2000s ===
Year	Artist	Video
**2002** (1st)	**Dragon Ash**	
**2002** (1st)	Aerosmith	
**2002** (1st)	Limp Bizkit	
**2002** (1st)	Love Psychedelico	
**2002** (1st)	U2	
**2003** (2nd)	**Red Hot Chili Peppers**	**"By the Way"**
**2003** (2nd)	Coldplay	"In My Place"
**2003** (2nd)	Dragon Ash	"Fantasista"
**2003** (2nd)	Foo Fighters	"All My Life"
**2003** (2nd)	Sum 41	"Still Waiting"
**2004** (3rd)	**Good Charlotte**	**"The Anthem"**
**2004** (3rd)	175R	"Sora ni Utaeba" (空に唄えば)
**2004** (3rd)	Dragon Ash	"Morrow"
**2004** (3rd)	Linkin Park	"Somewhere I Belong"
**2004** (3rd)	Metallica	"St. Anger"
**2005** (4th)	**Hoobastank**	**"The Reason"**
**2005** (4th)	Asian Kung-Fu Generation	"Kimi no Machi Made" (君の街まで)
**2005** (4th)	Good Charlotte	"Predictable"
**2005** (4th)	Linkin Park	"Breaking The Habit"
**2005** (4th)	Sambomaster	"Utsukushiki Ningen no Hibi" (美しき人間の日々)
**2006** (5th)	**Green Day**	**"Boulevard Of Broken Dreams"**
**2006** (5th)	Asian Kung-Fu Generation	"World Apart"
**2006** (5th)	Coldplay	"Speed of Sound"
**2006** (5th)	Ellegarden	"Red Hot"
**2006** (5th)	Sambomaster	"Sekai wa Sore o Ai to Yobundaze" (世界はそれを愛と呼ぶんだぜ)
**2007** (6th)	**My Chemical Romance**	**"Welcome to the Black Parade"**
**2007** (6th)	Asian Kung-Fu Generation	"Aru Machi no Gunjō" (或る街の群青)
**2007** (6th)	Ellegarden	"Salamander"
**2007** (6th)	Fall Out Boy	"This Ain't a Scene, It's an Arms Race"
**2007** (6th)	Radwimps	"Setsunarensa" (セツナレンサ)
**2008** (7th)	**Radwimps**	**"Order Made" (オーダーメイド)**
**2008** (7th)	9mm Parabellum Bullet	"Discommunication"
**2008** (7th)	Foo Fighters	"The Pretender"
**2008** (7th)	L'Arc-en-Ciel	"Seventh Heaven"
**2008** (7th)	Linkin Park	"What I've Done"
**2009** (8th)	**Maximum the Hormone**	**"Tsume Tsume Tsume" (爪爪爪)**
**2009** (8th)	9mm Parabellum Bullet	"Living Dying Message"
**2009** (8th)	Acidman	"I Stand Free"
**2009** (8th)	Fall Out Boy	"I Don't Care"
**2009** (8th)	Franz Ferdinand	"Ulysses"

=== 2010s ===
Year	Artist	Video
**2010** (9th)	**Superfly**	**"Dancing on the Fire"**
**2010** (9th)	9mm Parabellum Bullet	"Inochi no Zenmai" (命ノゼンマイ)
**2010** (9th)	Green Day	"Know Your Enemy"
**2010** (9th)	Muse	"Uprising"
**2010** (9th)	Radwimps	"Oshakanshama" (おしゃかしゃま)
**2011** (10th)	**Tokio Hotel**	**"Darkside of the Sun"**
**2011** (10th)	Linkin Park	"The Catalyst"
**2011** (10th)	Marina and The Diamonds	"Hollywood"
**2011** (10th)	One Ok Rock	"Jibun Rock" (じぶんROCK)
**2011** (10th)	Radwimps	"Dada"
**2012** (11th)	**One Ok Rock**	**"Answer is Near" (アンサイズニア)**
**2012** (11th)	Bon Iver	"Holocene"
**2012** (11th)	Radwimps	"Kimi to Hitsuji to Ao" (君と羊と青)
**2012** (11th)	Red Hot Chili Peppers	"The Adventures of Rain Dance Maggie"
**2012** (11th)	Sakanaction	"Bach no Senritsu o Yoru ni Kiita Sei Desu" (バッハの旋律を夜に聴いたせいです。)
**2013** (12th)	Fun featuring Janelle Monáe	"We Are Young"
**2013** (12th)	Man With A Mission	"Distance"
**2013** (12th)	Muse	"Follow Me"
**2013** (12th)	**One Ok Rock**	**"The Beginning"**
**2013** (12th)	Sakanaction	"Yoru no Odoriko" (夜の踊り子)
**2014** (12th)	Arctic Monkeys	"One for the Road (Arctic Monkeys song)"
**2014** (12th)	**One Ok Rock**	**"Be the light"**
**2014** (12th)	Radwimps	"Last Virgin"
**2014** (12th)	Sakanaction	"Good-Bye"
**2014** (12th)	Vampire Weekend	"Diane Young"

== See also ==
- MTV Video Music Award for Best Rock Video
- MTV Europe Music Award for Best Rock
