= Free Your Mind 33 =

Free Your Mind #33

Studio album by Dragon Ash
- Released: December 19, 1998
- Genre: Alternative rock, pop rock, rap rock
- Length: 37:07
- Label: Victor Entertainment

Dragon Ash chronology
| Buzz Songs (1998) | Free Your Mind #33 (1998) | Viva la Revolution (1999) |

Free Your Mind #33 is the first LP recording by Japanese group Dragon Ash, released in 1998.

Dragon Ash chose to release an LP format record because after the release of Buzz Songs in 1998, their new hip hop sound was escalating and there was a high demand for analogue versions of "陽はまたのぼりくりかえす" (Hi wa Mata Noborikuri Kaesu), which sampled drums from "We Will Rock You" by Queen, and "Under Age's Song (Album Mix)". In addition to these two tracks, they also updated "Fever" and "Baby Girl Was Born" from their 1997 album Mustang! with a more hip hop sound. Their collaboration with MIHO on this LP also set the groundwork for the production duo of Kj and BOTS collaborating with and producing future albums for other artists such as Sugar Soul, Wyolica, and Kaori Hifumi. This eventually led to the creation of the production team and hip hop group Steady & Co.

== Track listing ==
=== Side A ===
1. "Fever (Free Your Mind Mix)" feat. MIHO – 5:07
2. "Fever (Instrumental)" – 6:32
3. "陽はまたのぼりくりかえす" (Hi wa Mata Noborikuri Kaesu) – 6:32

=== Side B ===
1. "Baby Girl Was Born (Daddy's Mix)" feat. MIHO – 6:32
2. "Baby Girl Was Born (Instrumental)" – 6:32
3. "Under Age's Song (Album Mix)" – 6:32
