= Under Age's Song =

Single by Dragon Ash

from the album Buzz Songs
- B-side: "Face to Face"; "Mustang a Go Go !!!"
- Released: July 23, 1998
- Genre: Alternative rock, pop rock, rap rock
- Length: 15:41
- Label: Victor Entertainment

Dragon Ash singles chronology
"Hi wa Mata Noborikuri Kaesu" (1998)	"Under Age's Song" (1998)	"Free Your Mind #33" (1998)

"Under Age's Song" is the second maxi single by Japanese group Dragon Ash, released in 1998.

== Track listing ==
1. "Under Age's Song" – 6:00
2. "Face to Face" – 5:06
3. "Mustang a Go Go !!!" – 4:35
