= 2004 MTV Video Music Awards Japan =

Annual Japanese music awards ceremony

- Date: 23 May 2004
- Location: Tokyo Bay NK Hall, Urayasu, Chiba, Japan
- Hosted by: Tomomitsu Yamaguchi
- Website: mtvjapan.com/mvaj

Television/radio coverage
- Network: MTV Japan

The MTV Video Music Awards Japan 2004 were hosted by entertainer and singer Tomomitsu Yamaguchi at Tokyo Bay NK Hall in Urayasu, Chiba.

== Awards ==
Winners are in bold text.

=== Video of the Year ===
Missy Elliott — "Pass That Dutch"

- Mr. Children — "Kurumi"
- Mika Nakashima — "Seppun"
- Outkast — "Hey Ya!"
- Radiohead — "There There"

=== Album of the Year ===
Outkast — Speakerboxxx/The Love Below

- Missy Elliott — This Is Not a Test!
- Exile — Exile Entertainment
- Linkin Park — Meteora
- Mika Nakashima — Love

=== Best Male Video ===
Pharrell featuring Jay-Z — "Frontin'"

- Ken Hirai — "Style"
- Sean Paul — "Get Busy"
- Justin Timberlake — "Rock Your Body"
- Zeebra — "Touch The Sky"

=== Best Female Video ===
Ayumi Hamasaki — "Because of You"

- Beyoncé featuring Jay-Z — "Crazy in Love"
- BoA — "Double"
- Mika Nakashima — "Yuki no Hana"
- Britney Spears featuring Madonna — "Me Against the Music"

=== Best Group Video ===
Kick The Can Crew — "Saga Continue"

- The Black Eyed Peas — "Where Is the Love?"
- Blue — "Guilty"
- Dragon Ash — "Morrow"
- Rip Slyme — "Joint"

=== Best New Artist ===
Orange Range — "Shanghai Honey"

- Evanescence — "Bring Me to Life"
- Good Charlotte — "The Anthem"
- Halcali — "Strawberry Chips"
- Stacie Orrico — "Stuck"

=== Best Rock Video ===
Good Charlotte — "The Anthem"

- 175R — "Sora ni Utaeba"
- Dragon Ash — "Morrow"
- Linkin Park — "Somewhere I Belong"
- Metallica — "St. Anger"

=== Best Pop Video ===
Ayumi Hamasaki — "No Way to Say"

- Blue — "Guilty"
- Ketsumeishi — "Natsu no Omoide"
- Orange Range — "Shanghai Honey"
- Outkast — "Hey Ya!"

=== Best R&B Video ===
Namie Amuro — "Put 'Em Up"

- Mary J. Blige featuring Method Man — "Love @ 1st Sight"
- Double — "Destiny"
- Crystal Kay — "Candy"
- Alicia Keys — "You Don't Know My Name"

=== Best Hip-Hop Video ===
Zeebra — "Touch The Sky"

- 50 Cent — "21 Questions"
- Missy Elliott — "Pass That Dutch"
- Jay-Z featuring Pharrell — "Change Clothes"
- Rhymester — "The Great Amateurism"

=== Best Dance Video ===
BoA — "Double"

- Fire Ball — "Da Bala"
- Kylie Minogue — "Slow"
- Shinichi Osawa featuring Kj — "Shinin"
- Sean Paul — "Get Busy"

=== Breakthrough Video ===
Mika Nakashima — "Love Addict"

- The Black Eyed Peas — "Where Is the Love?"
- Halcali — "Giri Giri Surf Rider"
- Orange Range — "Shanghai Honey"
- Sean Paul — "Get Busy"

=== Best Video from a film ===
Pink featuring William Orbit — "Feel Good Time" (from Charlie's Angels: Full Throttle)

- Evanescence — "Bring Me to Life" (from Daredevil)
- Korn — "Did My Time" (from Lara Croft Tomb Raider: The Cradle of Life)
- Nelly, P. Diddy and Murphy Lee — "Shake Ya Tailfeather" (from Bad Boys 2)
- Quruli — "Highway" (from Josee, the Tiger and the Fish)

=== Best Collaboration ===
Beyoncé featuring Jay-Z — "Crazy in Love"

- Ken Hirai and Kyu Sakamoto — "Miagete Goran Yoru no Hoshi o"
- M-Flo Loves Crystal Kay — "Reeewind!"
- Crystal Kay Loves M-Flo — "I Like It"
- Britney Spears featuring Madonna — "Me Against the Music"
- Voice of Love Posse — "Voice of Love"

=== Best Live Performance ===
Ayumi Hamasaki

- Mary J. Blige
- Missy Elliott
- Good Charlotte
- M-Flo

=== Best buzz ASIA ===
==== Japan ====
Namie Amuro — "Put 'Em Up"

- Ai — "After the Rain"
- Chemistry — "Ashita e Kaeru"
- Ken Hirai — "Style"
- Hyde — "Horizon"
- Crystal Kay — "Can't be Stopped"
- Kick the Can Crew — "Vacation"
- Rip Slyme — "Joint"
- Hitomi Yaida — "Hitori Jenga"

==== South Korea ====
M — "Just One Night"

- Bada — "Music"
- Drunken Tiger — "Thumb"
- Eugene — "The Best"
- Jaurim — "Hey Guyz"
- Koo Jun Yup — "Escape"
- Wheesung — "With Me"
- Yoon Band — "I Will Forget"
- Yoon Gun — "By Chance"

==== Taiwan ====
Leehom Wang — "Last Night"

- 5566 — "Waiting"
- A-Mei — "Brave"
- Jay Chou — "In Name of Father"
- Elva Hsiao — "Password to Love"
- Vivian Hsu — "Mask"
- Mayday — "God of Gambling"
- David Tao — "Black Orange"
- Faye Wong — "Will Be Loving"

== Special awards ==
=== Best Director ===
The White Stripes — "The Hardest Button To Button" (directed by Michael Gondry)

=== Best Special Effects ===
The Chemical Brothers — "Get Yourself High" (Special Effects: Joseph Kahn)

=== Best style ===
Mika Nakashima — "Kissing"

=== Best Website ===
Kick the Can Crew (www.kickthecancrew.com)

=== Most Impressive Performance ===
Mary J. Blige

=== Inspiration Award ===
Janet Jackson

=== Legend Award ===
Ozzy Osbourne

== Live performances ==
- Ayumi Hamasaki — "Because of You"
- The Darkness — "I Believe in a Thing Called Love"
- Good Charlotte — "Walk Away"
- Janet Jackson — "All Nite (Don't Stop)"
- Mika Nakashima
- Missy Elliott — "Pass That Dutch"
- Namie Amuro — "Alarm"
- N.E.R.D — "She Wants to Move"
- Outkast
- Orange Range
- Zeebra — "Touch the sky"
