= Phantomime =

Phantomime may refer to:

- Phantomime (9mm Parabellum Bullet EP), a 2006 EP
- Phantomime (Ghost EP), a 2023 EP
- Phantomime, a 2024 album by Mori Calliope
- "Phantomime", an episode of The Ghosts of Motley Hall

== See also ==
- Pantomime
