= Gjallarhorn (disambiguation) =

Gjallarhorn refers to both a musical instrument and a drinking horn in Norse mythology.

Gjallarhorn may also refer to:

- Gjallarhorn (band), a Swedish language folk music band from Finland
- Gjallarhorn (album), 2005 album by Japanese band 9mm Parabellum Bullet
- Gjallarhorn, magazine published by the National Socialist Movement of Norway
- Gjallarhorn, fictional organization in the anime series Mobile Suit Gundam: Iron-Blooded Orphans
- Gjallarhorn, an exotic rocket launcher from the game Destiny
- Gjallarhorn (album), a 2017 album but Danheim for the single album
- Gjallarhorn (song), a song by Danheim from his album Munarvágr
