= Yume de Aetara =

Yume de Aetara ("If I see you in my dreams") refers to:

- Yume de Aetara (夢であえたら), a manga by HANAKO and the anime adaptation, serialized 1994–2000, distributed as If I See You in My Dreams in the United States
- "Yume de Aetara" (song) (夢で逢えたら), a 2006 song by Dragon Ash
