= Independiente (Dragon Ash album) =

Studio album by Dragon Ash
- Released: February 21, 2007
- Genre: Alternative rock; pop rock; rap rock
- Length: 57:09
- Label: Victor Entertainment

Dragon Ash chronology
Río de Emoción (2005)	Independiente (2007)	Freedom (2009)

Independiente is the seventh full-length album by Dragon Ash. It was released on February 21, 2007, and it serves as the group's 10th anniversary commemorative album, released exactly ten years after their debut release The Day Dragged On.

== Track listing ==
1. "Independiente (Intro)" – 2:04
2. "Develop the Music" – 4:00
3. "Stir" – 4:16
4. "Fly" – 4:02
5. "Ivory" – 4:16
6. "Libertad de Fiesta" – 4:06
7. "El Alma feat. SHINJI TAKEDA" – 4:00
8. "Rainy" – 4:11
9. "Step Show (Interlude)" – 2:06
10. "Samba'n'Bass" – 4:11
11. "Luz Del Sol feat. 大蔵 from ケツメイシ" (Luz Del Sol feat. Daizo from Ketsumeishi) – 4:17
12. "Few Lights till Night" – 4:35
13. "Beautiful" – 4:12
14. "夢で逢えたら" (Yume de Aetara) – 9:08
  "Hidden Track" (it starts 6:02 after track 14)

CD Extra (Video Clips)

1. "Ivory"
2. "Few Lights till Night"
3. "夢で逢えたら"
