= Harvest Remixes =

Remix album by Dragon Ash
- Released: March 24, 2004
- Genre: Techno, electronic rock
- Length: 57:56
- Label: Victor Entertainment

Dragon Ash chronology
Harvest (2003)	Harvest Remixes (2004)	Río de Emoción (2005)

Harvest Remixes is a remix album by Dragon Ash released in 2004. It includes remixes of ten tracks from their previous album, Harvest. The remixes were produced by the duo of Kj and BOTS from Dragon Ash under the name Fellows Inc. with help from other members Makoto Sakurai and Hiroki (who together called themselves Tekunokusu and have since formed endive). Other remixers include Dry & Heavy, Ganja Kru, and 3rd Force. The latter two may not have been actually involved, rather the songs might have been produced in the style of their music.

Harvest Remixes was also released as a vinyl LP on April 7, 2004, following the trend of their other analogue format releases in 2000.

== Track listing ==
1. "Canvas" (Riow Arai Mix) – 6:32
2. "Landscape" (Techno-x Mix) – 6:57
3. "Massy Evolution" (STROBO Mix) – 7:16
4. "Morrow" (DRY & HEAVY Mix) – 5:25
5. "House of Velocity" (Mold Mix) – 6:51
6. "Gymnopedie #1" (Pulse Programming Mix) – 3:51
7. "Byakuya" (HOOD Mix) – 3:24
8. "Sakuri Makori" (BOTS Mix) – 6:49
9. "United Rhythm" (Ganja Kru Mix) – 7:01
10. "Harvest" (3rd Force Mix) – 5:50
