= I Love Hip Hop =

Single by Dragon Ash
- B-side: "Freedom Of Expression" "Motor Headphone"
- Released: May 1, 1999
- Genre: Rap rock
- Length: 10:32
- Label: Victor Entertainment
- Songwriter(s): Kenji Furaya, Jake Hooker Richards, Allan Preston Sachs
- Producer(s): Dragon Ash, Mitsuo Konno, Shigenori Hashiba

Dragon Ash singles chronology
"Grateful Days" (1999)	"I Love Hip Hop" (1999)	"Deep Impact" (2000)

"I Love Hip Hop" is the fifth maxi single by Dragon Ash, released in 1999. It was released on the same day as "Grateful Days" and both singles quickly gained popularity in Japan.

"I Love Hip Hop" is performed to the tune of the famous 1975 song "I Love Rock 'n' Roll" by Arrows. Because of its remarkable karaoke-style singability, the song has been performed live by Dragon Ash on several occasions and remains a fan favorite. and this tune also samples the intro from "Clean Up Woman" by Betty Wright.

"Motor Headphone" is produced by members Ikuzo Baba and Makoto Sakurai and is named after their side project Motör Headphone.

== Track listing ==
1. "I Love Hip Hop" – 4:22
2. "Freedom of Expression" – 4:09
3. "Motor Headphone" – 2:01
