= Mustang! (Dragon Ash album) =

Studio album by Dragon Ash
- Released: November 21, 1997
- Studio: Hitokuchi-Zaka Studios; Bernie Grundman Mastering
- Genre: Hard rock; alternative rock
- Length: 64:08
- Label: Happy House (Victor)

Dragon Ash chronology
Public Garden (1997)	Mustang! (1997)	Buzz Songs (1998)

Professional ratings
Review scores
Source	Rating
Allmusic	link

Mustang! is the first full-length studio album by Dragon Ash, released on November 21, 1997. Even though chronologically it was already their third commercial release—preceded by two mini-albums (The Day Dragged On and Public Garden) earlier in the year—nevertheless, due to its full-length nature Mustang! is considered as the group's debut album, also marking their first major commercial release into the Japanese music market.

== Track listing ==
No.	Title	Length
1.	"One Way"	3:23
2.	"Rainy Day and Day"	3:25
3.	"Cowboy Fuck!"	5:09
4.	"Sleep"	4:28
5.	"Where Where Where"	5:35
6.	"My Friend"	5:39
7.	"N.J. Soul"	2:44
8.	"Baby Girl Was Born"	3:51
9.	"Siva (N.J. Mix)"	4:06
10.	"Generation Mind"	4:56
11.	"Sunday"	3:25
12.	"Monkey Punch Monkey Kick"	3:28
13.	"Maximum of Life"	4:37
14.	"Fever"	5:44
15.	"River"	6:18
Total length:		64:08
