= Buzz Songs =

Studio album by Dragon Ash
- Released: September 2, 1998
- Genres: Alternative rock, rap rock, pop rock
- Length: 52:06
- Label: Victor Entertainment

Dragon Ash chronology
Mustang! (1997)	Buzz Songs (1998)	Viva la Revolution (1999)

Professional ratings
Review scores
Source	Rating
Allmusic	3/5 stars

Buzz Songs is the second full-length album by Dragon Ash; released in 1998.

Buzz Songs is the first full-length album where Dragon Ash member DJ BOTS can be found supplying scratch and beat samples to several of the songs, before he officially joined in 1999.

== Track listing ==
1. "Intro (Bots' Show)" – 1:24
2. "Cool Boarders" – 4:27
3. "Don't Worry 'bout Me" – 4:28
4. "Cherub Rock" – 3:29
5. "Invitation (Buzz Mix)" – 2:58
6. "Under Age's Song (Album Mix)" – 7:10
7. "Perfect Government" – 5:20
8. "Pull Up Roots" – 3:56
9. "Melancholy" – 4:20
10. "Mustang A Go Go !!!" – 4:35
11. "陽はまたのぼりくりかえす" (Hi wa Mata Noborikuri Kaesu) – 8:12
12. "Iceman" (hidden track) – 4:46
