= Lily's E.P. =

Single by Dragon Ash

from the album Lily of da Valley
- Released: November 29, 2000
- Genre: Rap rock; nu metal; pop rock; alternative rock
- Length: 16:00
- Label: Victor Entertainment

Dragon Ash singles chronology
"Summer Tribe" (2000)	"Lily's E.P." (2000)	"Life Goes On" (2000)

Lily's E.P. is the eighth maxi single by Dragon Ash; released in 2000. It is stated on the CD packaging that both "Amploud" and "Shizuka na Hibi no Kaidan o" (静かな日々の階段を) are lead tracks, as opposed to the general trend in the music industry to dedicate singles to one lead or title track.

== Track listing ==
1. "Amploud" – 4:20
2. "Shizuka na Hibi no Kaidan o" (静かな日々の階段を) – 4:30
3. "Shizuka na Hibi no Kaidan o" (静かな日々の階段を; E.P. version) – 4:16
4. "Amploud" (Modern Beatnik Mix) – 3:34

== Charts ==
Weekly chart performance for Lily's E.P.
Chart (2000)	Peak position
Japan (Oricon)	2

== Certifications ==
Certifications for Lily's E.P.
Region	Certification	Certified units/sales
Japan (RIAJ)	Platinum	400,000^{^}
^{^} Shipments figures based on certification alone.
