= Movement (9mm Parabellum Bullet album) =

Studio album by 9mm Parabellum Bullet
- Released: June 15, 2011
- Genre: Rock, Hardcore, Punk
- Label: EMI Japan
- Producer: 9mm Parabellum Bullet

9mm Parabellum Bullet chronology
Revolutionary (2009)	Movement (2011)

Movement (ムーヴメント, Mūvumento) is the fourth full-length album of the Japanese rock band 9mm Parabellum Bullet, released on June 15, 2011. It peaked at number 6 on Oricon Albums Chart.

== Track listing ==
All lyrics are written by Takuro Sugawara, except track 7 by Yoshimitsu Taki.

Disc one
No.	Title	Music	Length
1.	"Arechi" (荒地)	Yoshimitsu Taki, Takuro Sugawara	2:55
2.	"Survive"	Yoshimitsu Taki	2:56
3.	"Atarashii Hikari" (新しい光)	Yoshimitsu Taki	4:04
4.	"Face To Faceless"	Yoshimitsu Taki	3:14
5.	"Gin Sekai" (銀世界)	Yoshimitsu Taki	3:39
6.	"Muddy Mouth"	Kazuhiko Nakamura	3:40
7.	"Hoshi ni Negai Wo" (星に願いを)	Yoshimitsu Taki	2:40
8.	"Monday"	Kazuhiko Nakamura	4:00
9.	"Endless Game"	Yoshimitsu Taki	3:44
10.	"Scenes"	Yoshimitsu Taki	3:34
11.	"Kamome" (カモメ (Seagull))	Yoshimitsu Taki	4:39
