= Nevermind Tribute =

Compilation album by Various artists
- Released: April 4, 2012
- Genre: Rock
- Length: 59:52
- Label: Far Eastern Tribe Records

Nevermind Tribute is a tribute album by Japanese rock artists released on April 4, 2012, to celebrate the 20th anniversary of Nirvana's album Nevermind. The album's release was announced on the official Facebook page regarding the project on February 20, 2012. A one-day live "Nevermind Tribute Live" was held to mark the release of the tribute album.

== Track listing ==
Nevermind Tribute track listing
No.	Title	Performed by	Length
1.	"Smells Like Teen Spirit"	One Ok Rock	5:07
2.	"In Bloom"	Low IQ 01	4:16
3.	"Come as You Are"	Back Drop Bomb	3:27
4.	"Breed"	10-Feet	3:52
5.	"Lithium"	Man with a Mission	3:40
6.	"Polly"	大橋トリオ (ohashiTrio)	3:09
7.	"Territorial Pissings"	9mm Parabellum Bullet	2:28
8.	"Drain You"	→Pia-no-jaC←	2:57
9.	"Lounge Act"	Four Minutes Til Midnight	3:48
10.	"Stay Away"	The Novembers	6:17
11.	"On a Plain"	Roach	2:52
12.	"Something in the Way"	SiM	4:15
13.	"Endless, Nameless" (Hidden Track)	不明	6:43
Total length:			49:15

== Charts ==
Chart (2012)	Peak position
Japanese Albums (Billboard)	15
Japanese Albums (Oricon)	17
