= Río de Emoción =

Studio album by Dragon Ash
- Released: September 9, 2005
- Genre: Latin rock, hip hop, soca, reggae, drum and bass
- Label: Victor Entertainment

Dragon Ash chronology
'Harvest Remixes' (2004)	Río de Emoción (2005)	'Independiente' (2007)

Río de Emoción is the sixth full-length album by Dragon Ash; released in 2005. It draws heavily on Spanish influences, with several of the tracks drawing influences from Latin music and instruments. The title of the album is also Spanish for River of Emotion. The track Resound ft. HIDE, 136 was featured in the 2006 movie The Fast and the Furious: Tokyo Drift. The album peaked at number 1 on Oricon Albums Chart and stayed on the chart for 11 weeks.

The track Los Lobos might be a reference to the band Los Lobos who are famous for their performances of Mexican mariachi and other folklore songs. The band might also have been an influence for the album.

== Track listing ==
1. "Intro" – 1:15
2. "Los Lobos" – 4:22
3. "Resound ft. HIDE, 136" – 4:45
4. "Palmas Rock ft. UZI-ONE" – 4:21
5. "Scarlet Needle" – 4:28
6. "夕凪Union" (Yuunagi Union) – 4:42
7. "The Narrow Way" – 3:36
8. "Cloverleaf" – 3:52
9. "Illogical" – 1:15
10. "Round Up" – 4:29
11. "Loca Burnin' ft. ainee, Shinji Takeda" – 4:15
12. "Crush The Window" – 4:17
13. "朝凪Revival" (Asanagi Revival) – 4:25
14. "See You In A Flash" – 3:57
15. "Something In View" (hidden track) – 3:44
