= Sugar Soul =

Japanese R&B group

- Origin: Japan
- Years active: 1996–2001
- Labels: Flava Records (1997); Warner Music Japan (1998—2001)
- Past members: Aiko, DJ Hasebe, Kawabe
- Website: www.wmg.jp/artist/sugarsoul

Sugar Soul (シュガー・ソウル, Shugā So'uru) was a Japanese three-member R&B group which formed in 1996. They soon made their debut in January 1997 on the Flava Records label. The members featured DJ Hasebe (programming), Aiko Machida (vocals) and Kawabe (composer). The band achieved success with the single "Garden" in 1999, which featured Kenji Furuya of Dragon Ash. The band was seen as one of the prominent new R&B-style musicians in Japan in the late 1990s.

In 2001, the band went on a permanent hiatus after the release of the single "Soulmate." Vocalist Aiko went on to become the vocalist of drum and bass band Kam in 2010.

Kumi Koda covered the Sugar Soul song "Ima Sugu Hoshii" in 2006, and in 2009 May J. covered "Garden."

== Discography ==
=== Original albums ===
Year	Album Information	Oricon Albums Charts	Reported sales
1999	On: Released: February 24, 1999; Label: Warner (WPC6-10006); Formats: CD, rental CD	10	139,000
2000	Uzu (うず; "Swirl"): Released: May 24, 2000; Label: Warner (WPC6-10083); Formats: CD, rental CD	3	340,000

=== Other albums ===
Year	Album Information	Oricon Albums Charts	Reported sales
2001	Sugar Soul Live: Balance: Live album; Released: January 24, 2001; Label: Warner (WPC6-10117/8); Formats: 2CD, rental CD	12	44,000
2002	Soul Jam: Remix album; Released: May 22, 2002; Label: Warner (WPC6-10117/8); Formats: CD, rental CD	97	3,000
2002	Soul Mix: Remix album; Released: October 23, 2002; Label: Warner (WPC6-10220); Formats: CD, rental CD	—	—
2003	Sugar Soul: Greatest hits album; Released: October 29, 2003; Label: Warner (WPCL-10016); Formats: CD, CD+DVD, rental CD	20	24,000

=== Singles ===
Release	Title	Notes	Oricon singles charts	Oricon sales	Album
1997	"Those Days"	Re-released in 1999, sales pertain to re-release	34	30,000	—
1998	"Kanashimi no Hana ni" (悲しみの花に; "To a Flower of Sadness")	Debut single under Warner	75	11,000	On
1998	"Sauce"	Produced by Shinichi Osawa	51	33,000	On
1999	"Namibia" (ナミビア)	Produced by Hirofumi Asamoto	50	13,000	On
1999	"Garden" feat. Kenji		2	923,000	Uzu
1999	"Siva 1999" feat. Zeebra		10	152,000	Uzu
2000	"Respectyourself"		15	76,000	Uzu
2000	"Ii yo" (いいよ; "It's Good")		79	2,600	Uzu
2001	"Soulmate"	Final release as a band	46	7,000	—
