= Talking Machine =

EP by 9mm Parabellum Bullet
- Released: October 2004
- Genres: Rock, Hardcore, Punk
- Producer: 9mm Parabellum Bullet

9mm Parabellum Bullet chronology
Talking Machine (2004)	Gjallarhorn (2005)

Talking Machine is an indies demo EP of Japanese rock band 9mm Parabellum Bullet. All of the songs listed appeared again on later releases.

== Track list ==
All lyrics are written by Takuro Sugawara.

Disc one
No.	Title	Music	Length
1.	"Talking Machine [demo ver.]"	Takuro Sugawara	3:00
2.	"Beautiful Target [demo ver.]"	Takuro Sugawara	3:31
3.	"Shonen no Koe [demo ver.]" (少年の声)	Takuro Sugawara	3:20
4.	"(teenage) Disaster [demo ver.]"	Takuro Sugawara	2:09

== Personnel ==
- Takuro Sugawara – lead vocals, lyricist, rhythm guitar, acoustic guitar (track 6)
- Yoshimitsu Taki – backing vocals, lead guitar
- Kazuhiko Nakamura – bass guitar, screaming (tracks 1 and 12)
- Chihiro Kamijo – drums
