= Discommunication e.p. =

Discommunication

EP by 9mm Parabellum Bullet
- Released: October 10, 2007
- Genres: Rock, Hardcore, Punk
- Labels: EMI Japan; TOCT-26365
- Producer: 9mm Parabellum Bullet

9mm Parabellum Bullet chronology
The World e.p. (2007)	Discommunication (2007)	Termination (2007)

Discommunication e.p. is a mini-album by Japanese rock band 9mm Parabellum Bullet released on October 10, 2007.

== Track listing ==
Disc one
No.	Title	Length
1.	"Discommunication"	3:16
2.	"35-Minute Live Track From “The World tour” 07.06.16 At Shinjuku LOFT"	35:55
