= Grateful Days =

Single by Dragon Ash

from the album Viva la Revolution
- Released: May 1, 1999
- Genre: Rap rock, pop rock
- Length: 20:42
- Label: Victor Entertainment

Dragon Ash singles chronology
"Let Yourself Go, Let Myself Go" (1999)	"Grateful Days" (1999)	"I Love Hip Hop" (1999)

"Grateful Days" is the fourth maxi single by Japanese group Dragon Ash, released in 1999. It was released on the same day as "I Love Hip Hop", and both singles quickly gained popularity in Japan.

The title track, "Grateful Days", samples the opening of "Today" by The Smashing Pumpkins and features fellow Japanese hip hop artist Zeebra and "The Queen of Japanese Lady Soul" Aco. The song quickly became a huge hit in Japan, reaching No. 1 on the Oricon charts, and remains a favorite among Dragon Ash fans.

The track also samples Pachelbel's Canon in the style of Coolio's "C U when U get there" and a live version of this track actually changes the chorus to the chorus of said track.

== Track listing ==
No.	Title	Length
1.	"Grateful Days"	4:56
2.	"Grateful Days" (remix)	4:59
3.	"Grateful Days" (live version)	6:07
4.	"Grateful Days" (unplugged mix)	4:40
Total length:		20:42
