= Lily of da Valley =

Studio album by Dragon Ash
- Released: March 14, 2001
- Genre: Rap rock; nu metal
- Length: 63:24
- Language: Japanese; English
- Label: Victor Entertainment
- Producer: Dragon Ash

Dragon Ash chronology
| Viva la Revolution (1999) | Lily of da Valley (2001) | Mob Squad (2003) |

Singles from Lily of da Valley
- 1. "Deep Impact" Released: March 15, 2000; 2. "Amploud" Released: November 29, 2000; 3. "Shizuka na Hibi no Kaidan o" Released: November 29, 2000

Professional ratings
Review scores
| Source | Rating |
|---|---|
| AllMusic | 2.5/5 stars |

Lily of da Valley is the fourth full-length album by Japanese rap rock group Dragon Ash; released in 2001. The album was preceded by the release of three singles, including "Shizuka na Hibi no Kaidan o", which was used as the ending theme for the 2000 film Battle Royale. The limited edition features "Episode 2" featuring Shun and Shigeo as a bonus track. The album also contains the hidden track "Hanakotoba".

In the language of flowers, lily of the valley represents the return of happiness.

== Critical reception ==
Ted Mills of AllMusic called the album a step down from Dragon Ash's preceding album Viva la Revolution (1999), writing that it was disappointing that the band's success following that album had "narrowed their focus" into making either "hardcore metal/hip-hop" tracks like "Let Yourself Go, Let Myself Go", or "soulful hip-hop" tracks with "female backing vocals" that follow the formula of another of their hits, "Grateful Days". While conceding that this does not mean the tracks "aren't exciting", Mills concluded it did mean that "the group has decided to turn the amps up to 11 without moving ahead".

== Commercial performance ==
Lily of da Valley debuted at number two on the Oricon Albums Chart, and was the 28th best-selling album of 2001 in Japan. It was eventually certified double platinum by the Recording Industry Association of Japan in March 2001, for shipments of 800,000 copies.

== Track listing ==
All songs written by Kenji Furuya unless otherwise stated.

1. "Intro" (Bots) – 1:08
2. "21st Century Riot" – 2:37
3. "Glory" – 5:00
4. "Amploud" – 4:16
5. "Bring It" – 4:32
6. "Sunset Beach" – 5:22
7. "My Friends' Anthem" – 3:07
8. "Yuri no Saku Basho De" (百合の咲く場所で) – 3:54
9. "Aim High" – 3:40
10. "Revolater" – 3:24
11. "Deep Impact" featuring Rappagariya, Yamadaman, Q, Kenji Furuya – 4:32
12. "Shizuka na Hibi no Kaidan o" (静かな日々の階段を) – 4:29
13. "Lily of da Valley" – 5:53
14. "Outro" (Bots) – 1:17
  - "Hanakotoba" (花言葉) (hidden track) – 8:45

=== Limited edition ===
The limited-edition version of the album features a bonus track added after "Outro", with "Hanakotoba" attached to the end of the track.

15. "Episode 2" featuring Shun & Shigeo from SBK – 2:42

== Charts ==
=== Weekly charts ===
Weekly chart performance for Lily of da Valley
| Chart (2001) | Peak position |
|---|---|
| Japanese Albums (Oricon) | 2 |

=== Year-end charts ===
Year-end chart performance for Lily of da Valley
| Chart (2001) | Position |
|---|---|
| Japanese Albums (Oricon) | 28 |

== Certifications ==
Certifications for Lily of da Valley
| Region | Certification | Certified units/sales |
|---|---|---|
| Japan (RIAJ) | 2× Platinum | 800,000^{^} |
^{^} Shipments figures based on certification alone.
