= Viva la Revolution (album) =

Studio album by Dragon Ash
- Released: July 23, 1999
- Genre: Alternative rock, rap rock, pop rock
- Length: 53:01
- Label: Victor Entertainment

Dragon Ash chronology
Buzz Songs (1998)	Viva la Revolution (1999)	Lily of da Valley (2001)

Professional ratings
Review scores
Source	Rating
Allmusic	3/5 stars

Viva la Revolution is the third full-length album by Dragon Ash, released in 1999. It is the first full-length album after Dragon Ash member DJ BOTS formally joined, creating the new hip hop/rock amalgamation sound for which they have since become known. It has been described as "the album where Kenji's polyphagia has been expressed best."

The song "Communication" is a new version of "I Love Hip Hop" with a different backing track and vocals to avoid copyright infringement of "I Love Rock 'n' Roll."

== Track listing ==
1. "Intro" – 0:52
2. "Communication" – 3:28
3. "Rock the Beat" – 3:26
4. "Humanity (Album Version)" – 2:58
5. "Attention" – 3:30
6. "Let Yourself Go, Let Myself Go" – 5:05
7. "Dark Cherries" – 4:01
8. "Drugs Can't Kill Teens" – 4:34
9. "Just I'll Say" – 3:17
10. "Fool Around" – 2:04
11. "Freedom of Expression" – 4:07
12. "Nouvelle Vague #2" – 2:35
13. "Viva la Revolution" – 5:00
14. "Grateful Days" – 4:49
15. "Outro" – 1:04
16. "Hot Cake" (hidden track) – 4:01

== Samples ==
"Communication"

- "Romeo and Juliet Break" & "Scratch Sentence One" from Super Duck Breaks by DJ Babu
- "Flash It to the Beat" by Flash & Furious 5
- "I'm Chief Kamanawanalea (We're the Royal Macadamia Nuts)" by The Turtles

"Rock the Beat"

- "I Can't Live Without My Radio" by LL Cool J
- "Kick & Loud" by Geisha Girls

"Attention"

- "Entropy" by DJ Shadow & The Groove Rubbers
- "That's the Joint" by Funky Four Plus One

"Dark Cherries"

- "Breakthrough" by Isaac Hayes

"Viva la Revolution"

- "Viva" by Tin Star

"Grateful Days"

- "Today" by Smashing Pumpkins
