= 2002 MTV Video Music Awards Japan =

Annual Japanese music awards ceremony

- Date: May 24, 2002
- Location: Tokyo International Forum, Tokyo, Japan
- Hosted by: London Boots Ichi-gō Ni-gō
- Website: mtvjapan.com/mvaj

Television/radio coverage
- Network: MTV Japan

The 2002 MTV Video Music Awards Japan were hosted by the Japanese comedy duo London Boots Ichi-gō Ni-gō at the Tokyo International Forum in Tokyo, Japan.

== Performances ==
- Namie Amuro
- Boyz II Men
- Chemistry
- Sheryl Crow – "Soak Up the Sun"
- Dragon Ash
- Ayumi Hamasaki – "Free & Easy"
- Jay-Z
- Joe
- Mr. Children
- Nickelback – "How You Remind Me"
- Oasis
- Rip Slyme

== Presenters ==
- Ayaka Seto – presented Best Video from a Film

== Winners and nominees ==
Finalists in 13 categories were chosen by MTV Japan viewers and a selection committee comprising MTV personnel and industry experts. Japanese and Western acts that released music and/or a music video in Japan between January 1, 2001, and February 28, 2002, were eligible for nomination. Winners were decided based on voting results and the committee's choice.

Winners are highlighted in bold.

Video of the Year	Best Male
**Mr. Children — "Kimi Ga Suki"**; Aerosmith — "Jaded"; Ayumi Hamasaki — "Dearest"; Janet Jackson — "All For You"; Hikaru Utada — "Traveling"	**Ken Hirai**; Cornelius; Eminem; Fatboy Slim; Jamiroquai
Best Female	Best Group
**Ayumi Hamasaki**; Janet Jackson; Misia; Britney Spears; Hikaru Utada	**Backstreet Boys**; Dragon Ash; Glay; Mr. Children; U2
Best New Artist	Best Rock
**Rip Slyme**; BoA; Chemistry; Alicia Keys; Linkin Park	**Dragon Ash**; Aerosmith; Limp Bizkit; Love Psychedelico; U2
Best Pop	Best R&B
**Chemistry**; Backstreet Boys; Ayumi Hamasaki; Pink; Britney Spears	**Hikaru Utada**; Mary J. Blige; Crystal Kay; Alicia Keys; Usher
Best Hip-Hop	Best Dance
**Rip Slyme**; Dabo; Missy Elliott; Jay-Z; Rhymester	**The Chemical Brothers**; Basement Jaxx; Daft Punk; Fatboy Slim; Gorillaz
Best Website	Best Video from a Film
**L'Arc-en-Ciel (www.LArc-en-Ciel.com)**; Björk (www.bjork.com); Dragon Ash (www.dragonash.co.jp); Eminem (www.eminem.com); Gorillaz (www.gorillaz.com)	**Christina Aguilera, Lil' Kim, Mýa and Pink — "Lady Marmalade" (from Moulin Rouge!)**; Destiny's Child — "Independent Women Part 1" (from Charlie's Angels); Dreams Come True — "Crystal Vine" (from Atlantis: The Lost Empire); L'Arc-en-Ciel — "Spirit Dreams Inside (Another Dream)" (from Final Fantasy: The Spirits Within); Zeebra (featuring Aktion) — "Neva Enuff" (from Brother)
Best Live Performance	
**Oasis**; Dragon Ash; Jay-Z; Rip Slyme; Rize	

== Special awards ==
=== Inspiration Award — Japan ===
Namie Amuro

=== Inspiration Award — International ===
Jay-Z

=== Best Asian Artist ===
Jay Chou

=== Legend Award ===
Jimmy Page
