= Public Garden (EP) =

EP by Dragon Ash
- Released: March 23, 1997
- Genre: Alternative rock, rap rock, punk rock
- Length: 31:10
- Label: Invitation (Victor)

Dragon Ash chronology
The Day Dragged On (1997)	Public Garden (1997)	Mustang! (1997)

Professional ratings
Review scores
Source	Rating
Allmusic	link

Public Garden is the second mini-album by Dragon Ash; released in 1997. "Realism II" was used as the theme for Asahi National Broadcasting Co.'s Sports Spotters show.

== Track listing ==
All tracks are written by Kenji Furuya

No.	Title	Length
1.	"Realism II"	2:55
2.	"Ability → Normal"	3:06
3.	"冬ノ道ノセイ" (Fuyu no Michi no Sei; "Cause of the Way of Winter")	3:35
4.	"Future"	4:47
5.	"People"	3:28
6.	"虹の彼方" (Niji no Kanata; "That Direction of a Rainbow")	3:07
7.	"Addiction"	3:01
8.	"Public Garden"	4:13
9.	"Cool Around" (hidden track)	1:22
Total length:		31:10
