= Shizuka na Hibi no Kaidan o =

Single by Dragon Ash

from the album Lily of da Valley
- Released: November 29, 2000
- Genre: Rap rock, Alternative hip hop, alternative rock
- Length: 17:32
- Label: Victor Entertainment

Dragon Ash singles chronology
"Amploud" (2000)	"Shizuka na Hibi no Kaidan o" (2000)	"Lily's E.P." (2000)

"Shizuka na Hibi no Kaidan o" (静かな日々の階段を, Climbing the Stairs of Quiet Days) is an extended play release by Dragon Ash, originally released on 12-inch vinyl in 2000. The title track was the ending theme for the popular Japanese film Battle Royale, also released in 2000. A version of the song appeared on their 2001 album Lily of da Valley.

== Track listing ==
=== Side A ===
1. "静かな日々の階段を" (E.P. version) (Shizuka na Hibi no Kaidan o) – 4:16
2. "静かな日々の階段を" (E.P. version instrumental) (Shizuka na Hibi no Kaidan o) – 4:16

=== Side B ===
1. "静かな日々の階段を" (Shizuka na Hibi no Kaidan o) – 4:30
2. "静かな日々の階段を" (instrumental) (Shizuka na Hibi no Kaidan o) – 4:30

== See also ==
- Battle Royale Original Soundtrack
