= Yume de Aetara (song) =

Single by Dragon Ash
- B-side: "Rainy"
- Released: December 6, 2006
- Genre: Alternative rock, pop rock
- Length: 18:08
- Label: Victor Entertainment

Dragon Ash singles chronology
| "'Few Lights Till Night'" (2006) | "Yume de Aetara" (2006) |

"Yume de Aetara" (official title: 夢で逢えたら) is the seventeenth maxi single by Dragon Ash; released in late 2006. Like their previous two singles, this single was part of the countdown to Dragon Ash's tenth anniversary album Independiente released in 2007.

The single also includes remixes of the title tracks from Dragon Ash's previous two singles, Ivory and Few Lights Till Night.

Yume de Aetara is also the name of a 1990s manga and subsequent anime series; though it shares nothing in common with the single except for its name, which translates to "if we met in my dream".

== Track listing ==
1. "To See You in My Dreams" (Yume de Aetara) – 4:43
2. "Rainy" – 4:16
3. "Ivory (Up, Bustle & Out Remix)" – 4:38
4. "Few Lights Till Night (Up, Bustle & Out Remix)" – 4:31
