= Gjallarhorn (EP) =

EP by 9mm Parabellum Bullet
- Released: December 8, 2005
- Genre: Rock, Hardcore, Punk
- Length: 20:15
- Label: under_bar ZNR-008
- Producer: 9mm Parabellum Bullet

9mm Parabellum Bullet chronology
Talking Machine (2004)	Gjallarhorn (2005)	Phantomime (2006)

Gjallarhorn (ギャラルホルン, Gyararuhorun) is the first mini-album of Japanese rock band 9mm Parabellum Bullet released on December 8, 2005. The song "Marvelous", as well as "Talking Machine" and "(Teenage) Disaster", were later re-recorded in The World e.p..

== Track list ==
All lyrics are written by 9mm Parabellum Bullet

Disc one
No.	Title	Music	Length
1.	"(Teenage) Disaster"	9mm Parabellum Bullet	2:06
2.	"Talking Machine"	9mm Parabellum Bullet	3:11
3.	"Interceptor"	9mm Parabellum Bullet	3:38
4.	"Atmosphere"	9mm Parabellum Bullet	3:26
5.	"Beautiful Target"	9mm Parabellum Bullet	3:23
6.	"Marvelous"	9mm Parabellum Bullet	2:50
7.	"Farther"	9mm Parabellum Bullet	1:42
Total length:			20:16

=== PV ===
- Farther

== Personnel ==
- Takuro Sugawara – lead vocals, lyricist, rhythm guitar
- Yoshimitsu Taki – backing vocals, lead guitar
- Kazuhiko Nakamura – bass guitar, screaming (track 4)
- Chihiro Kamijo – drums
