= 9mm Parabellum Bullet =

Japanese rock band

- Origin: Yokohama, Kanagawa, Japan
- Genres: Post-hardcore; alternative rock; heavy metal; punk rock; progressive rock
- Years active: 2004–present
- Labels: EMI Music Japan; Universal Music Japan; Sazanga
- Members: Takuro Sugawara; Yoshimitsu Taki; Kazuhiko Nakamura
- Past members: Chihiro Kamijo
- Website: 9mm.jp

9mm Parabellum Bullet (Japanese: キューミリ・パラベラム・バレット, Hepburn: Kyūmiri Paraberamu Baretto) is a Japanese rock band, formed in Yokohama in March 2004. The classic lineup featured vocalist and rhythm guitarist Takuro Sugawara, guitarist and backing vocalist Yoshimitsu Taki, bassist Kazuhiko Nakamura, and drummer Chihiro Kamijo, who came up with the band's name. Piano pieces included in some songs are performed by Taki, while the characteristic shouts are provided by Nakamura. After 21 years, Kamijo left the band at the end of 2025.

== History ==
=== 2005–2009: Early releases and major label debut ===
The band signed to under_bar, a sub-label of Reverb Records, and released two early mini-albums, Gjallarhorn in 2005 and Phantomime in 2006, and played live shows in Yokohama and Tokyo.

2007 saw the band signed to EMI Music Japan and the releases of The World e.p. which featured newly recorded version of songs from Gjallarhorn and two new tracks, and the Discommunication e.p., which features the song "Discommunication" and a 35-minute live recording. At the end of 2007 they released their first full album, Termination, after which they began their first solo tour.

In the summer of 2008 the band released the double A-side single "Supernova/Wanderland", which also included piano instrumentals of both songs and a third song called "Wildpitch". 9mm Parabellum Bullet were invited to play at Asian Kung-Fu Generation's Nano-Mugen Festival that year at the Yokohama Arena, a festival notable for featuring up-and-coming acts alongside more well known and foreign acts. They covered "Motorbreath" for the October 2008 Metallica tribute album Metal-ikka.

In October the band released their second full album Vampire and proceeded onto the Vampire Empire Tour 08/09. In April 2009, the band released their first live DVD, Act I, which contains 4 concerts from different points in their career.

=== 2009–2011: Revolutionary and Movement ===
In late spring of 2009, the band released the mini-album Black Market Blues e.p., which also included a recording of their free live performance at Yoyogi Park as a B-side. 2009 also saw 9mm Parabellum Bullet's first nomination at the MTV Video Music Awards Japan for "Best Rock Video", where they were nominated for the video of their song "Living Dying Message". They also performed this song live at the show.

9mm Parabellum Bullet appeared at numerous rock festivals across Japan notably including Rock in Japan Festival, Rising Sun Rock Festival and Space Shower's Sweet Love Shower. On September 9, 2009, 9mm Parabellum Bullet had their first show at the Nippon Budokan titled 999. This performance would appear on the Cold Edge e.p., released on September 30.

9mm Parabellum Bullet were invited to play at Countdown Japan 09/10. In early-January they released the single "Inochi no Zenmai", which was used as the theme for the live-action adaptation of the Higanjima manga. The single includes a cover of Linda Yamamoto's 1972 song "Dou ni mo Tomaranai". It was announced that April 21, 2010, would be the date of 9mm Parabellum Bullet's third full album release, titled Revolutionary. It was followed by a tour across Japan. In late March, a music video was shot for the last track of the new album, called "The Revolutionary".

On May 18, 2011, the single "Atarashii Hikari" was released. The band's fourth album Movement was released on June 15. They also performed at Yokohama Arena on June 26.

=== 2012–present: Dawning and Waltz on Life Line ===
9mm Parabellum Bullet covered "Territorial Pissings" for the album Nevermind Tribute, which was released on April 4, 2012 and is composed of various Japanese bands covering the entirety of Nirvana's highly acclaimed album Nevermind. Their first acoustic performance for MTV Unplugged was held at Billboard Live Tokyo with a limited capacity of 150 fans and released on home video on May 27. Their fourth single "Heart ni Hi wo Tsukete" followed on October 24, 2012.

On April 1, 2013, EMI Music Japan was completely merged into Universal Music Japan as a sublabel by the name EMI Records Japan as a result of Universal Music's purchase of EMI in September 2012. All the artists from EMI Music Japan will continue releasing material at Universal Music Japan while still maintaining the catalogue code (TOCT). Their fifth single "Answer and Answer" was released on May 29. 9mm Parabellum Bullet released their fifth album Dawning on June 26, 2013.

They performed a cover of "Instant Music" for the February 2014 The Pillows tribute album, Rock and Sympathy.

The band took part in the first day of Luna Sea's Lunatic Fest at Makuhari Messe on June 27, 2015. Luna Sea bassist J joined them onstage for "Cold Edge". 9mm Parabellum Bullet released a quadruple A-side single, "Hangyaku no March/Dark Horse/Daremo Shiranai/Mad Pierrot", on September 9. They also contributed a cover to a November 2015 tribute album for The Telephones, We are Disco!!! ~Tribute to The Telephones~.

In January 2016, 9mm Parabellum Bullet announced they had switched to the independent record label Sazanga Records. The album Waltz on Life Line was released on April 27, 2016. The band provided the opening theme songs "Inferno" and "Sacrifice" for the Berserk anime adaptation.

On December 31, 2025, 9mm Parabellum Bullet announced that drummer Chihiro Kamijo was no longer a member of the band after 21 years. They had held numerous discussions together, before coming to the decision.

== Band members ==
Current

- Takuro Sugawara (菅原 卓郎, Sugawara Takurō) – vocals, rhythm guitar (2004–present)
- Yoshimitsu Taki (滝 善充, Taki Yoshimitsu) – lead guitar, piano, drums, backing vocals (2004–present)
- Kazuhiko Nakamura (中村 和彦, Nakamura Kazuhiko) – bass, screams (2004–present)

Former

- Chihiro Kamijo (かみじょう ちひろ, Kamijō Chihiro) – drums (2004–2025)

== Equipment ==
=== Sugawara ===
- Guitars - ESP
  - ESP Snapper-S/AL (Black, Vintage White)
  - Gibson Les Paul Special
  - Edwards Jr. Custom
  - Navigator N-LP-480CTM
  - Navigator N-LP-480LTD
  - ESP TYG (Takuro Sugawara Signature Model)
  - ESP Bricoleur (Takuro Sugawara Signature Model)
  - ESP Truckster (James Hetfield Signature Model)
- Amps - Marshall, Fender
  - Fender Twin Reverb
  - Marshall JCM2000
  - Marshall Vintage Modern 2466 Amp Head
  - Marshall 1960AV
  - Marshall JCM800 2203
  - Marshall 1960X

=== Taki ===
- Guitars - ESP
  - ESP Snapper-S/AS (Honey Blond, Burner)
  - ESP Snapper-S/AS Matte Black (SUFFER Protomodel)
  - ESP Potbelly-STD (Amber Cherry Sunburst)
  - ESP Suffer (Yoshimitsu Taki Signature Model)
  - ESP Suffer Proto Type
  - ESP Max Cavalera AX (Max Cavalera Signature Model)
  - Edwards Karmaster
- Amps - Mesa/Boogie
  - Mesa/Boogie Dual Rectifier
  - Mesa/Boogie Triple Rectifier
  - Mesa/Boogie F-100
  - Yamaha F50-112

=== Nakamura ===
- Guitars - ESP
  - ESP AP 220 (Black)
  - ESP AP Custom Mat Black (Untitled Protomodel)
  - ESP Untitled (Kazuhiko Nakamura Signature Model)
  - ESP PB Type Custom
  - ESP Amaze-CTM (See Thru Black)
  - ESP X-JB (Acrylic Body)
  - Sepia Crue EAB-430 Acoustic Bass
  - Landscape SWB-Artist Electric Upright Bass
- Amps - SWR
  - SWR 750x

=== Kamijo ===
Kamijo is a full endorser of Yamaha drums, Remo drumheads, and Zildjian cymbals and drumsticks. Kamijo was a former user of Ludwig drums (notably the Vistalite series) prior to his switch to Yamaha, and has his signature model of drumsticks on Zildjian's website.

- Drums - Yamaha Birch Custom Absolute, Blue Ice Sparkle
  - 8"x10" Tom
  - 8"x12" Tom
  - 13"x14" Floor Tom
  - 15"x16" Floor Tom
  - 22"x18" Bass Drum (x2)
  - 6"x14" Snare Drum (as side snare)
  - 6.5"x14" Copper Snare
- Cymbals - Zildjian
  - 14" A Custom Hi-Hats
  - 6" Zil-Bel Small
  - 8" A Custom Splash
  - 10" A Custom Splash
  - 12" Z3 Splash
  - 12" A Zildjian Special Recording Hi-hat Bottom
  - 18" A Custom Projection Crash
  - 19" Z3 Rock Crash
  - 19" Z3 Thrash Ride
  - 20" A Custom China
  - 20" FX Oriental China "Trash"
- Drumheads - Remo
  - Bass Drums - Powerstroke 3 Clear (batter) | Ebony Powerstroke 3 (reso)
  - Toms - Emperor Clear (batter) | Ambassador Clear (reso)
  - Snare - Controlled Sound Reverse Dot (main, batter) / Black Suede Emperor (side, batter) | Ambassador Snare Side (reso)
- Hardware – Yamaha, DW
  - Yamaha FP9500 Direct Drive Single Pedal (x2)
  - DW 9000 Pedal (x2)
- Drumsticks – Zildjian
  - Zildjian 3A Wood Tip
  - Zildjian Chihiro Kamijo Artist Series Drumsticks
- Guitar – Gibson
  - Gibson Les Paul Standard (Blue)

== Discography ==
=== Studio albums ===
Year	Title	Peak chart positions	Ratings
Year	Title	JPN	Ratings
2007	Termination: Released: November 14, 2007	10	AllMusic
2008	Vampire: Released: October 15, 2008	2	AllMusic
2010	Revolutionary: Released: April 21, 2010	4	AllMusic
2011	Movement: Released: June 15, 2011	6	
2013	Dawning: Released: June 26, 2013	10	AllMusic
2016	Waltz on Life Line: Released: April 27, 2016	12	
2017	Babel: Released: May 10, 2017	10	
2019	Deep Blue: Released: September 9, 2019	18	
2022	Tightrope: Released: August 24, 2022	19	
2024	You Need Freedom to Be You: Released: October 23, 2024	30	

=== Mini albums ===
Year	Title	Oricon charts
2005	Gjallarhorn: Released: December 8, 2005	—
2006	Phantomime: Released: September 9, 2006	—
2007	The World e.p.: Released: May 16, 2007	22
2007	Discommunication e.p.: Released: October 10, 2007	9
2009	Black Market Blues e.p.: Released: June 3, 2009	5
2009	Cold Edge e.p.: Released: September 30, 2009	5
2011	Kamome e.p. (カモメ e.p.): Released: September 7, 2011	11

=== Singles ===
Year	Title	Oricon Singles Chart	Billboard Japan Hot 100
2008	"Supernova/Wanderland": Released: May 21, 2008	12	–
2010	"Inochi no Zenmai" (命ノゼンマイ): Released: January 6, 2010	8	7
2011	"Atarashii Hikari" (新しい光): Released: May 18, 2011	9	49
2012	"Heart ni Hi wo Tsukete" (ハートに火をつけて): Released: October 24, 2012	9	–
2013	"Answer and Answer": Released: May 29, 2013	10	–
2014	"Seimei no Waltz" (生命のワルツ): Released: December 10, 2014	17	53
2015	"Hangyaku no March/Dark Horse/Daremo Shiranai/Mad Pierrot" (反逆のマーチ/ダークホース/誰も知らない/Mad Pierrot): Released: September 9, 2015	19	27
2016	"Inferno" (インフェルノ): Released: July 20, 2016	23	55
2017	"Sacrifice" (サクリファイス): Released: June 6, 2017	25	68
2019	"Namonaki Hero" (名もなきヒーロー): Released: April 10, 2019	20	
2020	"Byakuya no Hibi" (白夜の日々): Released: September 9, 2020	19	

=== Compilation albums ===
Year	Title	Oricon charts
2014	Greatest Hits: Released: July 9, 2014	12

=== Covers ===
Year	Title	Original artist	Released on	Notes
2008	"Motorbreath"	Metallica	Metal-ikka	A tribute album to Metallica in celebration of their new album Death Magnetic (released on October 22, 2008).
2009	"TV no Singer"	The Yellow Monkey	This is For You ~ The Yellow Monkey Tribute Album	A tribute album to The Yellow Monkey (released on December 9, 2009).
2010	"Dou ni mo Tomaranai"	Linda Yamamoto	"Inochi no Zenmai"	A cover included on a 9mm Parabellum Bullet single (released on January 6, 2010).
2012	"Territorial Pissings"	Nirvana	Nevermind Tribute	A tribute album by Japanese artists to celebrate the 20th anniversary of Nirvana's album Nevermind (released on April 4, 2012).
2014	"Instant Music"	The Pillows	Rock and Sympathy -Tribute to the Pillows-	A second tribute album in honor of the 25th anniversary of The Pillows (released on February 26, 2014).
2015	"Monkey Discooooooo"	The Telephones	We are Disco!!! ~Tribute to The Telephones~	A tribute album to The Telephones who went on indefinite hiatus. (released on November 4, 2015)
2015	"Robinson"	Spitz	Just Like Honey ~Spitz 20th Anniversary Tribute~	A tribute album to Spitz (released on December 23, 2015)
2017	"Melodic Storm"	Straightener	Pause ~Straightener Tribute Album~	A tribute album to Straightener (released on October 18, 2017)
2019	"Tettōtetsubi Yonayona Drive"	Unison Square Garden	Thank You, Rock Bands! ~Unison Square Garden 15th Anniversary Tribute Album~	A tribute album to Unison Square Garden (released on July 24, 2019)

=== Demos ===
Year	Title
2004	Talking Machine

=== Home videos ===
Year	Title	Oricon DVD chart	Oricon Blu-ray chart
2009	Act I: Released: April 1, 2009	12	–
2010	Act II: Released: September 9, 2010	–	–
2010	Act III: Released: September 9, 2010	–	–
2010	Act II+III: Released: September 9, 2010	2	–
2012	Act IV: Released: April 18, 2012	10	14
2012	MTV Unplugged: Released: August 29, 2012	3	–
2014	Act O: Released: May 7, 2014	–	–
2014	Act E: Released: May 7, 2014	–	–
2014	Act O+E: Released: May 7, 2014	13	8
2019	Act VII: Released: June 26, 2019	46	38

== Awards and nominations ==
MTV Video Music Awards Japan

2008	"Discommunication"	Best Rock Video	Nominated
2009	"Living Dying Message"	Best Rock Video	Nominated
2010	"Inochi no Zenmai"	Best Rock Video	Nominated

== See also ==
- Japanese rock
