= Phantomime (9mm Parabellum Bullet EP) =

EP by 9mm Parabellum Bullet
- Released: September 9, 2006
- Genre: Rock, Hardcore, Punk
- Label: under_bar ZNR-019
- Producer: 9mm Parabellum Bullet

9mm Parabellum Bullet chronology
Gjallarhorn (2005)	Phantomime (2006)	The World e.p. (2007)

Phantomime (ファントマイム, Fantomaimu) is the second mini-album of Japanese rock band 9mm Parabellum Bullet. It was released on September 9, 2006. The CD contains a DVD featuring music videos of "(Teenage) Disaster" and "Talking Machine". The songs "Sector" and "Mr. Suicide" were later re-recorded for The World e.p..

== Track listing ==
All lyrics are written by 9mm Parabellum Bullet.

Disc one (CD)
No.	Title	Music	Length
1.	"Caucasus"	9mm Parabellum Bullet	3:28
2.	"Mr. Suicide"	9mm Parabellum Bullet	3:30
3.	"Vortex"	9mm Parabellum Bullet	2:27
4.	"Shonen no Koe" (少年の声)	9mm Parabellum Bullet	3:39
5.	"Sector"	9mm Parabellum Bullet	2:28

Disc two (DVD)
No.	Title	Music	Length
1.	"(Teenage) Disaster" (music video)	9mm Parabellum Bullet	2:09
2.	"Talking Machine" (music video)	9mm Parabellum Bullet	3:15

=== PV ===
- Mr. Suicide

== Personnel ==
- Takuro Sugawara – lead vocals, lyricist, rhythm guitar
- Yoshimitsu Taki – backing vocals, lead guitar
- Kazuhiko Nakamura – bass guitar, screaming (tracks 2 and 5)
- Chihiro Kamijo – drums
