= The World (EP) =

The World e.p.

EP by 9mm Parabellum Bullet
- Released: May 16, 2007
- Genre: Rock, Hardcore, Punk
- Length: 20:33
- Label: EMI Japan; TOCT-26246
- Producer: Junji Ishiwatari; 9mm Parabellum Bullet

9mm Parabellum Bullet chronology
Phantomime (2006)	The World e.p. (2007)	Discommunication e.p. (2007)

The World e.p. (ザ・ワールド イーピー, Za Wārudo ī pī) is a limited-edition mini-album by Japanese rock band 9mm Parabellum Bullet released on May 16, 2007. The album contains re-recordings of songs from previous albums as well as two new songs, "The World" and "Heat-Island". The album peaked at 22 on the Oricon charts.

== Track listing ==
Disc one
No.	Title	Music	Length
1.	"The World"	Takuro Sugawara	4:01
2.	"Heat-Island"	Takuro Sugawara	2:52
3.	"(Teenage) Disaster [New Recording]"	9mm Parabellum Bullet	2:04
4.	"Mr. Suicide [New Recording]"	9mm Parabellum Bullet	3:27
5.	"Marvelous [New Recording]"	9mm Parabellum Bullet	2:39
6.	"Talking Machine [New Recording]"	9mm Parabellum Bullet	3:10
7.	"Sector [New Recording]"	9mm Parabellum Bullet	2:23
Total length:			20:36

=== PV ===
- The World
- Heat-Island

== Personnel ==
- Takuro Sugawara – Lead vocals, lyricist, rhythm guitar
- Yoshimitsu Taki – Backing vocals, lead guitar
- Kazuhiko Nakamura – bass guitar, screaming (tracks 2, 4, and 7)
- Chihiro Kamijo – drums
