= Rainy Day and Day =

Single by Dragon Ash

from the album Mustang!
- B-side: "Invitation"
- Released: October 22, 1997
- Genre: Alternative rock, hard rock
- Length: 6:20
- Label: Victor Entertainment

Dragon Ash singles chronology
"Rainy Day and Day" (1997)	"Hi wa Mata Noborikuri Kaesu" (1998)

"Rainy Day and Day" is the first single by the Japanese group Dragon Ash, which was released in 1997. Their subsequent releases (not including full albums) were either maxi singles or LPs containing three or more tracks until the 2008 release of Velvet Touch, which contains only the title track and B-Side "cover" "La Bamba". The following single "Tsunagari Sunset" was also true to its name, with only the title track and B-side "Thought and Action". However, 2009's "Unmei Kyōdōtai" saw a return to their maxi single releases.

The title track "Rainy Day and Day" was the opening theme to Television Tokyo Channel 12, Ltd.'s 1997 anime series Virus Buster Serge.

== Track listing ==
1. "Rainy Day and Day" – 3:27
2. "Invitation" – 2:53
