= Fantasista (song) =

Single by Dragon Ash

from the album Harvest
- B-side: "Mob Squad"; "Patience"
- Released: March 6, 2002
- Genre: Rap rock, nu metal, punk rock
- Length: 4:30
- Label: Victor Entertainment
- Songwriter(s): Dragon Ash

Dragon Ash singles chronology
"Life Goes On" (2002)	"Fantasista" (2002)	"Morrow" (2003)

Fantasista is the tenth maxi single by Dragon Ash; released in 2002. Fantasista was one of the official songs of 2002 FIFA World Cup. Incidentally, the song is named after one of the names for a striker in football. It is named after Japanese footballer Shunsuke Nakamura.

In April 2011, the song was certified as a gold download to cellphones by the RIAJ, for legal downloads in excess of 100,000.

== Track listing ==
1. "Fantasista" – 4:30
2. "Mob Squad" – 4:04
3. "Patience" – 4:15
