= The Day Dragged On =

EP by Dragon Ash
- Released: February 21, 1997
- Genre: Punk rock
- Length: 26:23
- Label: Victor Entertainment

Dragon Ash chronology
The Day Dragged On (1997)	Public Garden (1997)

Professional ratings
Review scores
Source	Rating
Allmusic	2.5/5 stars

The Day Dragged On is the first commercial release and first mini-album by Dragon Ash; released in 1997. The song 天使ノロック (Tenshi no Rokku) became a Buzz Clip (a song deemed popular enough to have its video placed on high rotation) on MTV Japan for one week.

The hidden track Normal consists of a telephone call which plays a demo of the song Ability → Normal from their upcoming release Public Garden, followed by a busy signal indicating that the party on the other line has hung up.

== Track listing ==
1. "The Day Dragged On" – 2:12
2. "Siva" – 4:03
3. "天使ノロック" (Tenshi no Rokku) – 2:49
4. "Chime" – 4:54
5. "チェルノブイリに悲しい雨が降る" (Cherunobuiru ni Kanashii Ame ga Furu) – 2:37
6. "Realism" – 3:33
7. "羊を数えても夜は終わらない" (Hitsuji o Kazoete mo Yoru wa Owaranai) – 2:38
8. "Fake X Life" – 3:42
9. "Normal" (hidden track) – 1:55
