= Harvest (Dragon Ash album) =

Studio album by Dragon Ash
- Released: July 23, 2003
- Genre: Rap rock, nu metal
- Length: 59:57
- Label: Mob Squad, Victor Entertainment

Dragon Ash chronology
Mob Squad (2003)	Harvest (2003)	Harvest Remixes (2004)

Singles from Harvest
- 1. "Fantasista" Released: March 6, 2002; 2. "Morrow" Released: June 25, 2003

Harvest is the fifth studio full-length album by Dragon Ash, released in 2003. The album peaked at number 1 on Oricon Albums Chart and stayed on the chart for 14 weeks.

== Track listing ==
1. "Intro" – 0:58
2. "House of Velocity" – 4:30
3. "Posse in Noise" – 4:00
4. "Revive" – 4:34
5. "United Rhythm ft. 43K, EIG" – 4:16
6. "Byakuya" – 1:13
7. "Morrow" – 4:25
8. "Landscape" – 2:34
9. "Art of Delta" – 0:56
10. "Mob Squad (RITMO ACELERADO Remix)" – 4:13
11. "Episode 4 ft. SHUN, SHIGEO" – 4:59
12. "Massy Evolution" – 4:25
13. "Day 6" – 0:27
14. "Fantasista" – 4:30
15. "Canvas" – 4:33
16. "Gymnopedie #1" – 2:45
17. "Harvest" – 4:25
  - "Sakurimakori" (2:08) is a hidden track on the record.
