= Dragon Ash =

Japanese rap rock group

- Origin: Tokyo, Japan
- Genres: Rap rock; alternative rock; nu metal; reggae fusion; samba rock
- Years active: 1996–present
- Label: Victor Entertainment/Mob Squad
- Members: KJ; Makoto Sakurai; Bots; Hiroki
- Past members: Iküzöne; Dri-V; Atsushi
- Website: dragonash.co.jp

Dragon Ash (ドラゴンアッシュ, Doragon Asshu) is a Japanese rap rock group founded in 1996 by Kenji "KJ" Furuya and Makoto Sakurai. They were one of the first groups to popularize hip-hop in Japan. Dragon Ash is a member of Mob Squad, which is an affiliation with the bands Source and Endive. Dragon Ash uses the French fleur-de-lis as their band logo/symbol.

== History ==
Dragon Ash started out as a punk rock group. Lead singer and guitarist Kenji Furuya, son of actor Ikko Furuya, met drummer Makoto Sakurai when they were junior high students in a Tokyo suburb, and the two started playing together. Though temporarily sidetracked into following in his father's footsteps, Furuya gave up the few acting gigs that he was getting on TV dramas to concentrate on music in high school. In 1996, they took on bass player Ikuzo Baba, ten years their senior. The group debuted in 1997 with two EPs at the beginning of the year, The Day Dragged On and Public Garden, influenced by Nirvana. By the end of the year and time of their release, Mustang!, the group had progressed to a blend of various pop and rock influences.

Through 1998 their popularity increased, and by the time of Buzz Songs, their sound had solidified to rap rock, helped with the mixing skills of DJ Bots, who occasionally appeared on some songs. Two singles – "Let Yourself Go, Let Myself Go" and "Grateful Days," the latter featuring hardcore rapper Zeebra and soulstress ACO – sold so well that they topped the Japanese single and album Oricon charts; also simultaneously, usually reserved for pop music.

Their fourth single, "Let Yourself Go, Let Myself Go", reached number 7 on the Oricon Weekly Singles chart, and eventually climbed to number 4, selling a total of 640,000 copies. The band simultaneously released their fifth and sixth singles, "Grateful Days" and "I Love Hip Hop", which debuted at number 3 and number 4, respectively. When these two singles debuted, "Let Yourself Go, Let Myself Go" had not yet dropped off the top 10 chart, giving Dragon Ash three top 10 singles at the same time.

The band finally reached the peak of their success when they released their third album, Viva la Revolution, in July 1999 and it hit number 1 on its debut week. The album has sold in excess of 2,000,000 copies.

During 1999, Dragon Ash had become a four-piece, with DJ Bots essential to the mix. In 2000, Dragon Ash undertook the Total Music Communication Tour, touring Japan with a lineup that included other rising rock acts, such as Missile Girl Scout, Penpals, and Skebou Kings. Meanwhile, Furuya and DJ Bots formed a duo of sorts, writing and producing songs for acts such as Sugar Soul under the name Steady & Co. Likewise, Baba and Sakurai sidelined as a remixing unit called Motor Headphone, popping up on various compilations. The full band released Lily of da Valley in 2001.

Dragon Ash collaborated with the hip-hop group Rappagariya on "Deep Impact" in 2000. In 2003 the group expanded to include its full current roster of members, bringing in Hiroki, Atsushi, and Dri-V. In 2007 they celebrated their 10th anniversary by simultaneously releasing two best-of albums, The Best of Dragon Ash with Changes Vol. 1 and The Best of Dragon Ash with Changes Vol. 2. Both albums hit number 1 upon their debut.

Bandleader Kenji Furuya released his first solo album Everything Becomes The Music from Victor Entertainment in mid-2015. Following his solo debut song "Swallow Dive" in March 2015, anime director Kenji Kamiyama directed a music video for "Stairway", the leading track from the album.

Dragon Ash covered "Rocket Dive" for the June 6, 2018 hide tribute album Tribute Impulse.

== Members ==
- Kenji "KJ" Furuya (降谷建志) – lead vocals, MC, guitar, latin percussion, songwriter, composer, producer, bandleader (1996–present)
  - As the front-man and founding member of Dragon Ash, Kenji is also a popular model in Japan and Asia for style and fashion magazines. As a model he has also promoted brands Levis, Stussy, Adidas & Ray-ban (including appearing in a Japanese commercials for these brands). Kenji Furuya had been the spokesperson for the Sony Walkman series in the late 1990s and early 2000s (during the Walkman popularity in Japan), appearing in many commercials featuring Dragon Ash's latest music releases. In July 2008, Kenji married Japanese singer/actress Megumi Yamano, whom he had been dating since 2005. Kenji has appeared in various Japanese movies with main and cameo roles, and has also made his J-Drama debut in 2013, appeared as an actor in the NHK drama Yae's Sakura. In 2017, Kenji starred in Japanese film Alley Cat. In 2018, Kenji starred in season 3 J-drama Moribito: Guardian of the Spirit. K.J.'s father Ikko Furuya was also a well known actor in Japan.
- Makoto "MAKOTO" Sakurai (桜井誠) – drums, percussion, backing vocals (1996–present)
  - Makoto is also a lover of cooking; he has written two cookbooks in Japan. Makoto also appears on AbemaTV broadcast "The Saku Kouichi Sambu Thursday The Night" showcasing his skills and hobby for Japanese slot machines.
- Tetsuya "DJ BOTS" Sato (佐藤哲也) – DJ, turntables, synthesizer, sampler, producer, latin percussion, backing vocals [support member] (1998–1999), [band member] (1999–present)
  - DJ BOTS joined Dragon Ash in 1999. In 2015 DJ Bots completed a DJ mix album for Dragon Ash, titled 'dodecahedron mix "by DJ BOTS". Tetsuya an avid fan for the sport of soccer; he is also the captain of his own official soccer team.
- Hiroki "HIROKI" Sugiyama (杉山弘樹) – electric guitar [support member] (2000–2003), [band member] (2003–present)
  - Hiroki was first a support member for Dragon ash from 2000, then became a full-time member in 2003 as the main guitarist.

Former members

- Ikuzo "IKÜZÖNE" Baba (馬場育三) – bass, mentor (1996–2012)
  - Ikuzone was a big fan of hide of X Japan. Ikuzone's musical influences came from Japanese metal. He died on April 21, 2012, from acute heart failure.
- Kensuke "KENKEN" Kaneko (金子賢輔) – bass (2011–2019)
  - KenKen is the full-time bass guitarist for the band Rize.
- Atsushi "ATSUSHI" Takahashi (高橋アツシ) – dance choreographer, dance, performing arts [support member] (2001–2003), [band member] (2003–2020)
  - In 2009, founded the dance movement/project "Power of Life".
- Masaki "DRI-V" Chiba (千葉雅紀) – dance, performing arts [support member] (2001–2003), [band member] (2003–2020)
  - Dri-V first joined Dragon Ash being introduced by Japanese Hiphop group Rip Slyme. He was first a support member for Dragon ash from 2001, then a full member in 2003. From 2015 Masaki has started his own project and YouTube channel called Dri-V Dance School.

Support member

- Tsuyoshi "T$UYO$HI" Ishikawa (石川剛) – bass (2019–present)
  - T$UYO$HI is also the full-time bass guitarist for the band The Bonez.

== Accomplishments timeline ==
1997

- Oricon Album Sales – Mustang! (200,000)

1998

- Oricon Album Sales – Buzz Songs (1 Million)
- Oricon Single Sales – "Hi wa Mata Noborikuri Kaesu" (200,000)
- Oricon Weekly Album Chart Top 10 Highest Ranking – Buzz Songs (No. 8)
- MTV JAPAN Presents Dragon Ash 'High Times Tour' (all four performances)
- MTV JAPAN Presents Dragon Ash 'FACE TO FACE National Tour' (all 10 performances)

1999

- Space Shower Music Video Awards – Best Artist Video – "Let Yourself Go, Let Myself Go" (Winner)
- Oricon Album Sales – Viva La Revolution (2 Million)
- Oricon Single Sales – "Grateful Days" (featuring Zeebra & Aco) (1 Million)
- Oricon Single Sales – "Let Yourself Go, Let Myself Go" (500,000)
- Oricon Single Sales – I ♥ Hip Hop (500,000)
- Oricon Weekly Album Chart Top 10 Highest Ranking – Viva La Revolution (No. 1)
- Oricon Weekly Single Chart Top 10 Highest Ranking – "Grateful Days" (featuring Zeebra & Aco) (No. 1)
- Oricon Weekly Single Chart Top 10 Highest Ranking – "Let Yourself Go, Let Myself Go" (No. 4)
- Oricon Weekly Single Chart Top 10 Highest Ranking – "I ♥ Hip Hop" (No. 4)
- Oricon Top 100 Best Selling Albums of the Year – Viva La Revolution (No. 13)
- Oricon Top 100 Best Selling Singles of the Year – "Grateful Days" (No. 13)
- Oricon Weekly Single Chart Top 10 Ranking 3 Singles At The Same Time (May 1999) – "Grateful Days" (featuring Zeebra & Aco) (No. 3), "I ♥ Hip Hop" (No. 4), "Let Yourself Go, Let Myself Go" (No. 7)
- 'Let Yourself Go' Dragon Ash National Tour (all 13 performances)
- 'Freedom of Expression' Dragon Ash National Tour (all 19 performances)
- Dragon Ash presents 'Total Music Communication 1999 Tour' (all two performances)

2000

- Japan Gold Disc Awards – Rock Album of the Year – Viva la Revolution (Winner)
- Oricon Single Sales – "Deep Impact" (featuring Rappagariya) (500,000)
- Oricon Single Sales – "Summer Tribe" (250,000)
- Oricon Single Sales – "TMC Graffiti" (Kenji Furuya & DJ BOTS [from Dragon Ash] with 'TMC ALLSTARS') (200,000)
- Oricon Weekly Single Chart Top 10 Highest Ranking – "Deep Impact" (featuring Rappagariya) (No. 2)
- Oricon Weekly Single Chart Top 10 Highest Ranking – Summer Tribe (No. 4)
- Dragon Ash presents 'Total Music Communication 2000 Spring Tour' (all 14 performances)
- Dragon Ash presents 'Total Music Communication 2000 Summer Tour' (all 18 performances)
- Dragon Ash (with SBK) 'DSM CIRCUIT Tour' (all 11 performances)

2001

- Oricon Album Sales – Lily of da Valley (1 Million)
- Oricon Single Sales – "Lily's E.P." (500,000)
- Oricon Weekly Album Chart Top 10 Highest Ranking – Lily of da Valley (No. 2)
- Oricon Weekly Single Chart Top 10 Highest Ranking – "Lily's E.P." (No. 2)
- Oricon Weekly Video/DVD Chart Top 10 Highest Ranking – Lily da Video (No. 2)
- Oricon Weekly Video/DVD Chart Top 10 Highest Ranking - Buzz Clips (No. 10)
- Dragon Ash '21st Century Riot National Tour' (all 27 performances)
- Dragon Ash presents 'Total Music Communication 2001 Tour' (all 13 performances)

2002

- MTV Video Music Awards Japan – Best Rock Artist (Winner)
- MTV Video Music Awards Japan – Best Group (Nomination)
- MTV Video Music Awards Japan – Best Live Performance (Nomination)
- MTV Video Music Awards Japan – Best Website (Nomination)
- Oricon Single Sales – "Life Goes On" (1 Million)
- Oricon Single Sales – "Fantasista" (500,000)
- Oricon Weekly Single Chart Top 10 Highest Ranking – "Life Goes On" (No. 1)
- Oricon Weekly Single Chart Top 10 Highest Ranking – "Fantasista" (No. 1)
- Oricon Top 100 Best Selling Singles of the Year – "Life Goes On" (No. 4)
- Dragon Ash presents 'Total Music Communication 2002 Tour' (all 14 performances)
- Dragon Ash '2002 Nationwide Tour' (all 29 performances)

2003

- Space Shower Music Video Awards – Best Rock Video – "Life Goes On" (Winner)
- Japan Countdown Awards – Best Group (Winner)
- MTV Video Music Awards Japan – Best Rock Video – Fantasista (Nomination)
- HMV Japan Top 100 Japanese Pop Artists of All Time – (No. 63)
- Oricon Album Sales – Mob Squad (200,000) (Dragon Ash with Mach25 & SOURCE)
- Oricon Album Sales – Harvest (500,000)
- Oricon Single Sales – "Morrow" (200,000)
- Oricon Weekly Album Chart Top 10 Highest Ranking – Harvest (No. 1)
- Oricon Weekly Single Chart Top 10 Highest Ranking – "Morrow" (No. 2)
- Oricon Weekly Album Chart Top 10 Highest Ranking – Mob Squad (No. 9) (Dragon Ash with Mach25 & SOURCE)
- Dragon Ash 'House of Velocity Nationwide Tour' (all 29 performances)

2004

- Japan Gold Disc Awards - Rock Album of the Year - Harvest (Winner)
- MTV Video Music Awards Japan - Best Rock Video - Morrow (Nomination)
- MTV Video Music Awards Japan - Best Group Video - Morrow (Nomination)
- Oricon Single Sales - Shade (100,000)
- Oricon Weekly Single Chart Top 10 Highest Ranking - Shade (No. 2)
- Dragon Ash (with Source) 'MOB SQUAD 2004 Tour' (all 11 performances)

2005

- Oricon Album Sales - Río de Emoción (200,000)
- Oricon Single Sales - crush the window (100,000)
- Oricon Single Sales - Yuunagi UNION (100,000)
- Oricon Weekly Album Chart Top 10 Highest Ranking - Río de Emoción (No. 1)
- Oricon Weekly Single Chart Top 10 Highest Ranking - crush the window (No. 2)
- Oricon Weekly Single Chart Top 10 Highest Ranking - Yuunagi Union (No. 4)
- Dragon Ash '~Río de Emoción~ National Tour' (all 22 performances)

2006

- Oricon Weekly Single Chart Top 10 Highest Ranking - Ivory (No. 10)
- Oricon Weekly Single Chart Top 10 Highest Ranking - few lights till night (No. 9)
- Oricon Weekly Single Chart Top 10 Highest Ranking - Yume de Aetara (No. 10)

2007

- MTV Video Music Awards Japan - Best BuzzAsia Japan - Ivory (Nomination)
- Oricon Album Sales - The Best of Dragon Ash with Changes Vol. 1 (250,000)
- Oricon Album Sales - The Best of Dragon Ash with Changes Vol. 2 (250,000)
- Oricon Album Sales - INDEPENDIENTE (200,000)
- Oricon Weekly Album Chart Top 10 Highest Ranking - INDEPENDIENTE (No. 4)
- Oricon Weekly Album Chart Top 10 Highest Ranking - The Best of Dragon Ash with Changes Vol. 1 (No. 3)
- Oricon Weekly Album Chart Top 10 Highest Ranking - The Best of Dragon Ash with Changes Vol. 2 (No. 2)
- Oricon Weekly DVD/Blu-ray Chart Top 10 Highest Ranking - The Best of Dragon Ash with Changes (No. 8)
- Oricon Weekly Album Chart Top 10 Ranking 2 Albums At The Same Time (September 2007) - The Best of Dragon Ash with Changes Vol. 2 (No. 2), The Best of Dragon Ash with Changes Vol. 1 (No. 3)
- Dragon Ash '~DEVELOP THE MUSIC~ National Tour' (all 22 performances)

2008

- Oricon Weekly Single Chart Top 10 Highest Ranking - Velvet Touch (No. 7)
- Oricon Weekly Single Chart Top 10 Highest Ranking - Tsunagari Sunset (No. 10)

2009

- Oricon Album Sales - Freedom (100,000)
- Oricon Weekly Album Chart Top 10 Highest Ranking - Freedom (No. 6)
- Dragon Ash '~FREEDOM~ National Tour' (all 19 performances)
- Summer Sonic Music Festival - Multiple Appearances (2000, 2002, 2009)
- Rising Sun Rock Festival - Multiple Appearances (1999, 2002, 2004, 2007, 2009)

2010

- Oricon Album Sales - Mixture (100,000)
- Oricon Weekly Single Chart Top 10 Highest Ranking - Ambitious (No. 8)
- Oricon Weekly Single Chart Top 10 Highest Ranking - Spirit of Progress E.P. (No. 9)
- Oricon Weekly Album Chart Top 10 Highest Ranking - Mixture (No. 7)
- MUSIC ON TV Music Festival - Multiple Appearances (2007, 2009-2010)

2011

- Oricon Weekly DVD/Blu-ray Chart Top 10 Highest Ranking - MIXTURE -VIDEO MIX & DOCUMENT- (No. 9)
- Dragon Ash '~RAMPAGE~ National Tour' (all 21 performances)

2012

- Oricon Album Sales - Loud & Peace (100,000)
- Oricon Weekly Album Chart Top 10 Highest Ranking - Loud & Peace (No. 3)
- Dragon Ash '~REST IN PEACE IKÜZÖNE~ National Tour' (all five performances)
- SETSTOCK Rock Festival - Multiple Appearances (2003, 2005, 2007, 2009, 2011-2012)

2013

- Oricon Weekly DVD/Blu-ray Chart Top 10 Highest Ranking - Live & Piece (No. 8)
- Shonan Oto Matsuri Festival - Consecutive Appearances (2006-2013)

2014

- Oricon Album Sales - The Faces (100,000)
- Oricon Weekly Album Chart Top 10 Highest Ranking - The Faces (No. 3)
- Oricon Weekly DVD/Blu-ray Chart Top 10 Highest Ranking - Live Tour THE SHOW MUST GO ON Final At BUDOKAN May 31, 2014 (No. 3)
- Dragon Ash '~THE SHOW MUST GO ON~ National Tour' (all 19 performances)
- Space Shower TV - Sweet Love Shower Music Festival - Multiple Appearances (2007, 2009, 2012, 2014)
- Monster Bash Rock Festival - Multiple Appearances (2002, 2005, 2007, 2009, 2011, 2013-2014)

2015

- Kyoto Strategy Rock Festival - Consecutive Appearances (2007-2015)

2016

- First Dragon Ash single with two music videos released (main song and b-side - Hikari no Machi & Headbang).

2017

- For the first time, Dragon Ash appeared on the number one weekly music Japanese program 'Music Station' on the 26 May 2017 episode, performing their song "Mix It Up". Music Station played a Dragon Ash career montage, displaying a compilation of music videos, analysis of record sales and Oricon weekly number 1 chart positions.
- Oricon Weekly Album Chart Top 10 Highest Ranking - Majestic (No. 3)
- Victor Entertainment Rock Matsuri Festival - Consecutive Appearances (2014-2017)
- RUSH BALL Rock Festival - Multiple Appearances (1999, 2001, 2003, 2005-2008, 2010, 2012-2013, 2015-2017)
- ROCK in JAPAN Festival - Consecutive Appearances (2000-2017)

2018

- Space Shower Music Video Awards 2018 – Best Punk/Loud Rock Artist (Nominee)

=== Album/single Oricon sales milestones ===
Albums

- [1997.11.21] Mustang! (200,000) [gold]
- [1998.09.02] Buzz Songs (1,000,000) [million]
- [1999.07.23] Viva La Revolution (2,000,000) [2 million]
- [2001.03.14] Lily Of Da Valley (1,000,000) [million]
- [2001.11.28] Chambers (500,000) [double platinum] ((Kenji Furuya & DJ Bots with 'Steady&Co.'))
- [2003.03.19] Mob Squad (200,000) [gold] ((Dragon Ash with Mach25 & SOURCE))
- [2003.07.23] Harvest (500,000) [double platinum]
- [2005.09.09] Río de Emoción (200,000) [gold]
- [2007.02.21] Independiente (200,000) [gold]
- [2007.09.05] The Best of Dragon Ash with Changes Vol. 1 (250,000) [platinum]
- [2007.09.05] The Best of Dragon Ash with Changes Vol. 2 (250,000) [platinum]
- [2009.03.04] Freedom (100,000) [gold]
- [2010.12.08] Mixture (100,000) [gold]
- [2012.08.22] Loud & Peace (100,000) [gold]
- [2014.01.15] The Faces (100,000) [gold]
- [2017.05.31] Majestic (100,000) [gold]

Singles

- [1998.05.21] "Hi wa Mata Noborikuri Kaesu" (200,000) [gold]
- [1999.03.03] "Let Yourself Go, Let Myself Go" (500,000) [double platinum]
- [1999.05.01] "Grateful Days" (feat. ZEEBRA & ACO) (1,000,000) [million]
- [1999.05.01] "I ♥ Hip Hop" (500,000) [double platinum]
- [2000.03.15] "Deep Impact" (feat. Rappagariya) (500,000) [double platinum]
- [2000.07.12] "Summer Tribe" (250,000) [platinum]
- [2000.11.29] "Lily's e.p." (500,000) [double platinum]
- [2001.07.08] "Stay Gold" (250,000) [platinum] ((Kenji Furuya & DJ Bots with 'Steady&Co.'))
- [2001.10.24] "Shunkashuutou" (250,000) [platinum] ((Kenji Furuya & DJ Bots with 'Steady&Co.'))
- [2002.01.23] "Life goes on" (1,000,000) [million]
- [2002.03.06] "Fantasista" (500,000) [double platinum]
- [2003.06.25] "Morrow" (200,000) [gold]
- [2004.07.14] "Shade" (100,000) [gold]
- [2005.06.01] "Crush the Window" (100,000) [gold]
- [2005.07.13] "Yuunagi Union" (100,000) [gold]

Best-selling music artists list in Japan (Top 50 of all time)

- [1996–present] Dragon Ash Total Sales (15,000,000+)

=== Top 5 highest weekly Oricon chart ranking milestones ===
Albums

- [1999.07.23] Viva La Revolution (No.1)
- [2001.03.14] Lily Of Da Valley (No.2)
- [2001.11.28] Chambers (No.2) (Kenji Furuya & DJ Bots with 'Steady&Co.')
- [2003.07.23] Harvest (No.1)
- [2005.09.09] Río de Emoción (No.1)
- [2007.02.21] Independiente (No.4)
- [2007.09.05] The Best of Dragon Ash with Changes Vol. 1 (No.3)
- [2007.09.05] The Best of Dragon Ash with Changes Vol. 2 (No.2)
- [2012.08.22] Loud & Peace (No.3)
- [2014.01.15] The Faces (No.3)
- [2017.05.31] Majestic (No.3) ((No.2)) ((Billboard Japan Hot 100))

Singles

- [1999.03.03] "Let Yourself Go, Let Myself Go" (No.4)
- [1999.05.01] "Grateful Days" (feat. Zeebra & ACO) (No.1)
- [1999.05.01] "I Love Hip Hop" (No.4)
- [1999.09.08] "Garden" (No.2) (Sugar Soul feat. Kenji Furuya of 'Dragon Ash')
- [2000.03.15] "Deep Impact" (feat. Rappagariya) (No.2)
- [2000.07.12] "Summer Tribe" (No.4)
- [2000.11.29] "Lily's e.p." (No.2)
- [2001.07.08] "Stay Gold" (No.2) (Kenji Furuya & DJ Bots with 'Steady&Co.')
- [2001.10.24] "Shunkashuutou" (No.2) (Kenji Furuya & DJ Bots with 'Steady&Co.')
- [2002.01.23] "Life goes on" (No.1)
- [2002.03.06] "FANTASISTA" (No.1)
- [2003.06.25] "Morrow" (No.2)
- [2004.07.14] "Shade" (No.2)
- [2005.06.01] "Crush the Window" (No.2)
- [2005.07.13] "Yuunagi Union" (No.4)
- [2010.06.16] "AMBITIOUS" ((No.4)) ((Billboard Japan Hot 100))

DVD/Blu-ray

- [2001.04.18] LILY DA VIDEO (No.2)

== Discography ==
=== EPs ===
- [1997.02.21] The Day Dragged On
- [1997.04.23] Public Garden

=== Albums ===
- [1997.11.21] Mustang!
- [1998.09.02] Buzz Songs
- [1999.07.23] Viva La Revolution
- [2001.03.14] Lily of da Valley
- [2003.07.23] Harvest
- [2005.09.09] Río de Emoción
- [2007.02.21] Independiente
- [2009.03.04] Freedom
- [2010.12.08] Mixture
- [2014.01.15] The Faces
- [2017.05.31] Majestic

=== Compilation albums ===
- [2007.09.05] The Best of Dragon Ash with Changes Vol. 1
- [2007.09.05] The Best of Dragon Ash with Changes Vol. 2
- [2012.08.22] Loud & Peace

=== Vinyl records ===
- [1998.12.19] Free Your Mind #33
- [2000.03.15] Deep Impact (feat. Rappagariya)
- [2000.07.12] Summer Tribe
- [2000.07.26] TMC Graffiti (Kenji Furuya & DJ BOTS with 'TMC ALLSTARS')
- [2000.08.23] Episode 2 (feat. Shun & Shigeo from SBK)
- [2000.11.29] Amploud
- [2000.11.29] Shizuka na Hibi no Kaidan wo (静かな日々の階段を; The Stair Steps of a Quiet Day)
- [2001.07.08] Stay Gold (Kenji Furuya & DJ BOTS with 'Steady&Co.')
- [2001.10.24] Shunkashuutou (春夏秋冬; Spring Summer Autumn Winter) (Kenji Furuya & DJ BOTS with 'Steady&Co.')
- [2001.12.01] One Holy Story (Kenji Furuya & DJ BOTS with 'Steady&Co.')
- [2004.03.24] Harvest Remixes

=== Singles ===
- [1997.10.22] Rainy Day and Day
- [1998.05.21] Hi wa Mata Noborikuri Kaesu (陽はまたのぼりくりかえす; The Sun Will Rise Again and Again)
- [1998.07.23] Under Age's Song
- [1999.03.03] Let yourself go, Let myself go
- [1999.05.01] Grateful Days (feat. Zeebra & Aco)
- [1999.05.01] I ♥ Hip Hop
- [2000.03.15] Deep Impact (feat. Rappagariya)
- [2000.07.12] Summer Tribe
- [2000.11.29] Lily's E.P.
- [2002.01.23] Life goes on
- [2002.03.06] Fantasista
- [2003.06.25] morrow
- [2004.07.14] Shade
- [2005.06.01] Crush the Window
- [2005.07.13] Yuunagi UNION (夕凪UNION; Twilight Union)
- [2006.07.19] Ivory
- [2006.09.27] Few Lights Till Night
- [2006.12.06] Yume de Aetara (夢で逢えたら; If We Met in My Dream)
- [2008.06.18] Velvet Touch
- [2008.12.03] Tsunagari SUNSET (繋がりSUNSET; Linking Sunset)
- [2009.02.04] Unmei Kyoudoutai (運命共同体; Fate Cooperative System)
- [2010.06.16] Ambitious
- [2010.11.03] Spirit of Progress E.P.
- [2012.09.19] Run to the Sun / Walk with Dreams
- [2013.05.29] Here I Am
- [2013.11.27] Lily
- [2016.11.09] Hikari no Machi (光りの街; The City of Light)
- [2017.03.29] Beside You
- [2019.07.19] Fly Over
- [2021.04.14] Endeavour

Digital download-limited singles

- [2009.08.01] Callin'
- [2010.10.20] Rock Band (feat. Ko-Ji Zero Three [from 'GNz-WORD'] & Satoshi [from 'YAMAARASHI'])
- [2012.07.04] Walk with Dreams
- [2014.01.22] Curtain Call
- [2017.02.21] Mix It Up

=== Collaborations ===
- [1998.12.19] "Fever" [Free Your Mind Remix] (feat. MIHO)
- [1999.05.01] "Grateful Days" (feat. Zeebra & ACO)
- [1999.07.23] "Nouvelle Vague #2" (feat. Mayumi Chiwaki)
- [1999.07.23] "Viva la Revolution" (feat. MIHO)
- [2000.03.15] "Deep Impact" (feat. Rappagariya)
- [2000.07.26] "TMC Graffiti" (Kenji Furuya & DJ BOTS [from Dragon Ash] with 'TMC ALLSTARS')
- [2000.08.23] "Episode 2" (feat. Shun & Shigeo from SBK)
- [2001.11.28] "Chambers" ((Kenji Furuya & DJ BOTS [from Dragon Ash], Shigeo [from SBK] & Illmari [from Rip Slyme] as 'Steady&Co.'))
- [2001.11.28] "One Holy Story" ((Kenji Furuya & DJ BOTS [from Dragon Ash], Shigeo [from SBK] & Illmari [from Rip Slyme] as 'Steady&Co. [feat. Azumi from 'Wyolica']))
- [2002.03.06] "Mob Squad" (feat. ONO-G, Kuro-nee [from 'Source'] & PASSER, HUNTER [from 'MACH25'])
- [2003.03.19] "Mob Squad II" (feat. ONO-G, Kuro-nee [from 'Source'] & PASSER, HUNTER [from 'MACH25'])
- [2003.07.23] "United Rhythm" (feat. 43K, EIG from POSSIBILITY)
- [2003.07.23] "Episode 4" (feat. Shun & Shigeo from SBK)
- [2005.06.01] "Resound" (feat. HIDE [from DT.] & 136)
- [2005.09.07] "Palmas Rock" (feat. UZI-ONE from AGGRESSIVE DOGS)
- [2005.09.07] "Loca Burnin'" (feat. Ainee [from Smorgas] & Shinji Takeda)
- [2007.02.21] "El Alma" (feat. Shinji Takeda)
- [2007.02.21] "Luz del Sol" (feat. Daizo from Ketsumeishi)
- [2007.09.05] "Wipe Your Eyes" (feat. Kaori Mochida from Every Little Thing)
- [2009.03.04] "Episode 6" (feat. Shun & Shigeo from SBK)
- [2010.06.16] "Sky Is the Limit" (feat. Takumi from 10FEET)
- [2010.06.16] "Beat Surf" (feat. PES [from Rip Slyme] & VERBAL [from M-Flo])
- [2010.11.03] "Ghost Remains" (feat. UZI-ONE from AGGRESSIVE DOGS)
- [2010.11.03] "Rock Band" (feat. Satoshi [from Yamaarashi] & KO-JI ZERO THREE [from GNZ-WORD)
- [2014.01.15] "Still Goin' On" (feat. 50caliber, HAKU the ANUBIZ & WEZ from YALLA FAMILY)
- [2014.01.15] "The Live" (feat. KenKen from RIZE)
- [2019.07.10] "Fly Over" (feat. T$UYO$HI [from 'The BONEZ'])

=== Remixes ===
- [1998.09.02] Invitation [Buzz Mix]
- [1998.12.19] Fever [Free Your Mind Remix] (feat. MIHO)
- [1999.05.01] Grateful Days [Remix] (feat. Zeebra & ACO)
- [2000.07.12] Summer Tribe [Komorebi Mix]
- [2000.11.29] Shizuka na Hibi no Kaidan wo [e.p. version]
- [2003.07.23] Mob Squad [RITMO ACELERADO Remix]
- [2004.03.24] Landscape [Techno-X Mix]
- [2015.03.09] Viva La Revolution [Paint the Lily Remix]

=== Cover songs ===
- [2008.06.18] "La Bamba" (Originally by Ritchie Valens)
- [2011.07.13] "Dreamin'" (Originally by BOØWY)
- [2013.12.18] "Saraba Seishun" (さらば青春; Farewell Youth) (Originally by Elephant Kashimashi)
- [2014.06.11] "That's the Way We Unite" (Originally by 'BACK DROP BOMB')
- [2014.10.08] "Tsuki Akari Shita De" (月灯りの下で; Under the Moon Light) (Originally by 'MONGOL800')
- [2018.06.06] "Rocket Dive" (Originally by 'HIDE')

=== Soundtrack and commercial songs ===
- [1997.04.23] "Realism II" (Asahi National Broadcasting Co.'s "Sports Spotters" official theme song)
- [1997.10.22] "Rainy Day and Day" (Virus Anime OST - featured as official opening theme song)
- [1998.07.23] "Hi wa Mata Noborikuri Kaesu" (陽はまたのぼりくりかえす; The Sun Will Rise Again and Again) (DT Eightron Anime OST)
- [2000.03.15] "Deep Impact" (Sony Walkman Official commercial song)
- [2000.11.29] "Amploud" (Sony Walkman Official commercial song)
- [2000.11.29] "Shizuka na Hibi no Kaidan wo" (静かな日々の階段を; The Stair Steps of a Quiet Day) (Battle Royale Movie OST - featured as official ending credits song))
- [2000.11.29] "Shizuka na Hibi no Kaidan wo" (e.p. version) (Sony Walkman Official commercial song)
- [2001.03.14] "Revolater" (DREAM Mixed Martial Arts official theme song)
- [2001.12.01] "One Holy Story" (Kenji Furuya & DJ BOTS with 'Steady&Co.') (Sony Walkman Official commercial song)
- [2002.01.23] "Life Goes On" (Sony Walkman Official commercial song)
- [2002.03.06] "Fantasista" (FIFA 2002 World Cup - Japan Official theme song)
- [2005.06.01] "Crush the Window" (Sony Walkman Official commercial song)
- [2005.09.09] "Palmas Rock" (feat. UZI-ONE) (Nissan Cube Official commercial song)
- [2006.12.20] "Resound" (feat. HIDE & 136) (The Fast and the Furious: Tokyo Drift Movie OST)
- [2007.02.21] "El Alma" (feat. Shinji Takeda) (Salaryman NEO J-Drama - Official insert song)
- [2007.02.21] "Rainy" (Kissmark Official commercial song)
- [2007.11.24] "Thought & Action" (Shabake J-Drama OST - featured as official ending credits song)
- [2008.06.18] "Velvet Touch" (FIFA Asia Cup 2008 - Japan Official theme song)
- [2008.06.18] "La Bamba" (Kyocera W64SA Mobile Phone commercial song)
- [2010.06.16] "Ambitious" (FIFA 2010 World Cup - Japan Official theme song)
- [2012.07.04] "Walk with Dreams" (Pocari Sweat Official commercial song)
- [2013.05.29] "Here I Am" (Fuji TV ONE - Variety Show 'Pachi Journey' official ending theme)
- [2013.05.29] "Trigger" (Resident Evil: Revelations Video Game official theme song)
- [2013.11.27] "Lily" (J-League Soccer Team TV Program - Official theme song)
- [2014.01.22] "Curtain Call" (Tenchu J-Drama - Official theme song)
- [2014.04.09] "Blow Your Mind" (Crows Explode Movie OST)
- [2016.11.09] "Hikari no Machi" (光りの街; The City of Light) (g.o.a.t app - Commercial Song)
- [2017.07.02] "Ode to Joy" (Budweiser - Commercial Song)

=== VHS/Videos ===
- [1999.10.21] Buzz Clips
- [2000.03.15] THE REAL BASS PLAY OF Dragon Ash
- [2001.04.18] Lily da Video
- [2003.12.24] Posse in Video

=== DVDs ===
- [2000.03.15] THE REAL BASS PLAY OF Dragon Ash
- [2001.04.18] Buzz Clips
- [2001.04.18] Lily da Video
- [2003.12.24] Posse in Video
- [2005.12.21] Video de Emoción
- [2007.09.26] The Best of Dragon Ash with Changes
- [2011.09.21] Mixture DVD -Video Mix & Document-
- [2013.07.03] Live & Piece
- [2014.09.03] Video the Faces
- [2014.09.17] Live Tour THE SHOW MUST GO ON Final At BUDOKAN May 31, 2014
- [2016.11.09] The Lives at Ishimaki Blue Resistance June 24, 2016
- [2017.03.29] 20 years of Dragon Ash Documentary
- [2017.05.31] DRAGON ASH 20TH ANNIVERSARY LIVE SHOW「MIX IT UP」AT EX THEATER ROPPONGI FEB/21/2017
- [2018.03.28] Live Tour MAJESTIC Final at YOKOHAMA ARENA

=== Blu-rays ===
- [2013.07.03] Live & Piece
- [2014.09.03] The Best of Dragon Ash with Changes
- [2014.09.03] Video the Faces
- [2014.09.17] Live Tour THE SHOW MUST GO ON Final At BUDOKAN May 31, 2014
- [2018.03.28] Live Tour MAJESTIC Final at YOKOHAMA ARENA

=== iTunes Store concert film downloads ===
- [2013.07.03] Dragon Ash: LIVE -1999.10.17 YOKOHAMA ARENA-
- [2013.07.03] Dragon Ash: LIVE -2001.05.05 Tokyo Bay NK Hall-
- [2013.07.03] Dragon Ash: LIVE -2003.11.23 Tokyo Bay NK Hall-
- [2013.07.03] Dragon Ash: LIVE -2009.05.08 Zepp Tokyo-
- [2013.07.03] Dragon Ash: LIVE -2011.04.22 Zepp Tokyo-
- [2014.09.17] Dragon Ash: LIVE -2014.05.31 BUDOKAN-

=== Photobooks ===
- [1999.12.01] Grateful Days
- [2003.08.13] Live Goes On~Dragon Ash Tour02
- [2013.07.03] Lice & Piece
- [2014.09.17] Dragon Ash Tour THE SHOW MUST GO ON

=== Mobile phone apps ===
- [2013.07.22] Dragon Ash Official App for Android
- [2013.12.06] Dragon Ash Official App for iPhone

== Music videos ==
1997

- "Tenshi no Rokku" ('天使ノロック; Angel Rock')
- "Ability→Normal"
- "Rainy Day and Day"

1998

- "Hi wa Mata Noborikuri Kaesu" ('陽はまたのぼりくりかえす; The Sun Will Rise Again and Again')
- "Under Age's Song"

1999

- "Let Yourself Go, Let Myself Go"
- "Grateful Days" (feat. ZEEBRA & ACO)
- " I ♥ HIP HOP"
- "Rock the beat"

2000

- "Deep Impact" (feat. Rappagariya)
- "Summer Tribe"
- "Amploud"
- "Shizuka na Hibi no Kaidan wo" ('静かな日々の階段を; The Stair Steps of a Quiet Day')
- "Bring It"

2001

- "Revolater"
- "Sunset Beach"
- "Stay Gold" (Kenji Furuya & DJ Bots [from 'Dragon Ash'] with 'Steady&Co.')
- "Shunkashuutou" (春夏秋冬; Spring Summer Autumn Winter) (Kenji Furuya & DJ Bots [from 'Dragon Ash'] with 'Steady&Co.')
- "Only Holy Story" (feat. Azumi [from 'Wyolica']) (Kenji Furuya & DJ Bots [from 'Dragon Ash'] with 'Steady&Co.')

2002

- "Life goes on"
- "Fantasista"

2003

- "morrow"
- "Revive"
- "Episode 4" (feat. SHUN & SHIGEO [from 'SBK'])
- "MOB SQUAD Part II" (feat. ONO-G, Kuro-nee [from 'Source'] & PASSER, HUNTER [from 'MACH25'] (Kenji Furuya [from 'Dragon Ash'] with 'MOB SQUAD')

2004

- "Shade"

2005

- "crush the window"
- "Yuunagi UNION" ('夕凪UNION; Twilight UNION')
- "Los Lobos"
- "Palmas Rock" (feat. UZI-ONE [from 'AGGRESSIVE DOGS'])
- "Scarlet Needle"

2006

- "Ivory"
- "few lights till night"
- "Yume de Aetara" ('夢で逢えたら; If We Met in My Dream')

2007

- "Fly"
- "Wipe Your Eyes" (feat. Kaori Mochida [from 'Every Little Thing'])

2008

- "Velvet Touch"
- "Tsunagari SUNSET" ('繋がりSUNSET; Linking Sunset')

2009

- "La Bamba"
- "Unmei Kyoudoutai" ('運命共同体; Fate Cooperative System')
- "Callin'"

2010

- "Ambitious"
- "Rock Band" (feat. Ko-Ji Zero Three [from 'GNz-WORD'] & Satoshi [from 'YAMAARASHI'])
- "Time of Your Life"

2011

- "Economy Class"
- "Fire Song"
- "Sky Is the Limit" (feat. Takuma [from '10-FEET'])

2012

- "Walk with Dreams"
- "Run to the Sun"

2013

- "Here I Am"
- "Trigger"
- "Lily"

2014

- "The Show Must Go On"
- "Blow Your Mind"
- "Curtain Call"
- "The Live" (feat. KenKen [from 'RIZE'])

2015

- "Dodecahedron Mix"
- "Everything Becomes the Music" (Kenji Furuya [from 'Dragon Ash'])
- "Swallow Dive" (Kenji Furuya [from 'Dragon Ash'])
- "Stairway" (Kenji Furuya [from 'Dragon Ash'])
- "One Voice" (Kenji Furuya [from 'Dragon Ash'])
- "Prom Night" (Kenji Furuya [from 'Dragon Ash'])

2016

- "Hikari no Machi (光りの街; The City of Light)
- "Headbang"

2017

- "Mix It Up"
- "Beside You"
- "Ode to Joy"

2018

- "Wonder Last" (Kenji Furuya [from 'Dragon Ash'])
- "Playground" (Kenji Furuya [from 'Dragon Ash'])
- "Where You Are" (Kenji Furuya [from 'Dragon Ash'])

2019

- "Fly Over" (feat. T$UYO$HI [from 'The BONEZ'])

2020

- "Golden Angle" (Kenji Furuya & Makoto Sakurai [from 'Dragon Ash' as 'The Ravens'])
- "Endeavour"
- "New Era"

=== Collaborative music videos ===
2004

- m-flo - "Way You Move" (featuring Dragon Ash)

== Tours ==
- 1998 MTV JAPAN Presents Dragon Ash 'High Times' Tour (all 4 performances)
- 1998 MTV JAPAN Presents Dragon Ash 'FACE TO FACE' National Tour (all 10 performances)
- 1999 'Let Yourself Go' Dragon Ash National Tour (all 13 performances)
- 1999 'Freedom of Expression' Dragon Ash National Tour (all 19 performances)
- 1999 Dragon Ash presents 'Total Music Communication' Tour (all 2 performances)
- 2000 Dragon Ash presents 'Total Music Communication' Spring Tour (all 14 performances)
- 2000 Dragon Ash presents 'Total Music Communication' Summer Tour (all 18 performances)
- 2000 Dragon Ash (with 'SBK') 'DSM CIRCUIT' Tour (all 11 performances)
- 2001 Dragon Ash '21st Century Riot National' Tour (all 27 performances)
- 2001 Dragon Ash presents 'Total Music Communication' Tour (all 13 performances)
- 2002 Dragon Ash presents 'Total Music Communication' Tour (all 14 performances)
- 2002 Dragon Ash 'Life Goes On' Nationwide Tour (all 29 performances)
- 2003 Dragon Ash 'House of Velocity' Nationwide Tour (all 29 performances)
- 2004 Dragon Ash (with 'Source') 'MOB SQUAD' Tour (all 11 performances)
- 2005 Dragon Ash '~Río de Emoción~' National Tour (all 22 performances)
- 2007 Dragon Ash '~DEVELOP THE MUSIC~' National Tour (all 22 performances)
- 2009 Dragon Ash '~FREEDOM~' National Tour (all 19 performances)
- 2011 Dragon Ash '~RAMPAGE~' National Tour (all 21 performances)
- 2012 Dragon Ash '~REST IN PEACE IKÜZÖNE~' National Tour (all 5 performances)
- 2014 Dragon Ash '~THE SHOW MUST GO ON~' National Tour (all 19 performances)
- 2016 Dragon Ash '~The Lives' National Tour~ (all 8 performances)
- 2017 Dragon Ash '~Majestic Tour 2017 (all 32 performances)

== Awards ==
- Space Shower Music Video Awards 1999 – Best Artist Video – "Let Yourself Go, Let Myself Go" (Winner)
- Japan Gold Disc Awards 2000 – Rock Album of the Year – Viva la Revolution (Winner)
- MTV Video Music Awards Japan 2002 – Best Rock Artist of the Year (Winner)
- Space Shower Music Video Awards 2003 – Best Rock Video – Life Goes On (Winner)
- Japan Countdown Awards 2003 – Best Group of the Year (Winner)
- Japan Gold Disc Awards 2004 – Rock Album of the Year – Harvest (Winner)
- Space Shower Music Video Awards 2018 – Best Punk/Loud Rock Artist (Nomination)
