= Ariel Rechtshaid production discography =

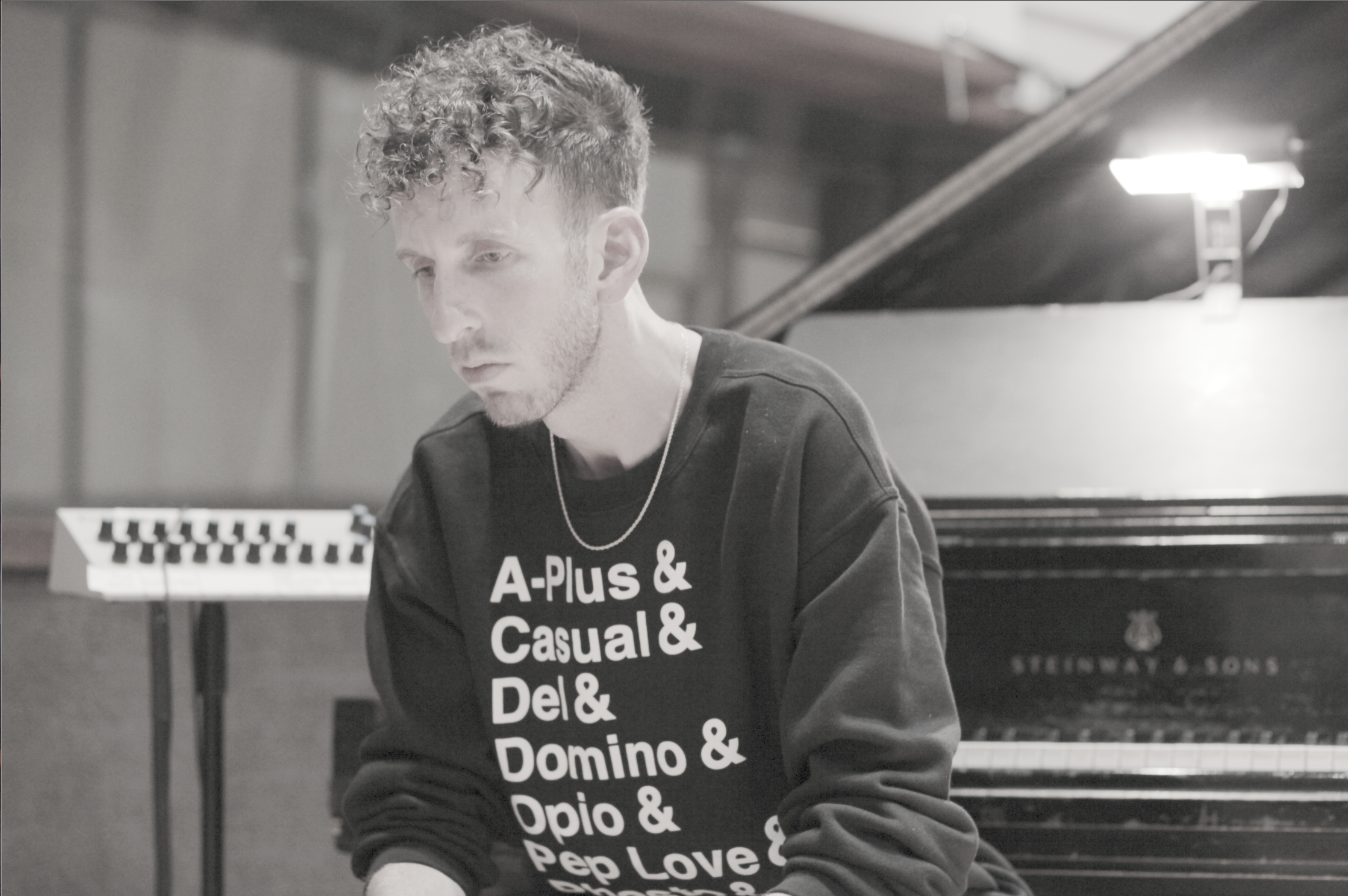
Rechtshaid in 2013

American record producer and songwriter Ariel Rechtshaid has written and produced songs for various musicians, including his bands The Hippos and Foreign Born.

In 2014, he was nominated for a Grammy Award for Producer of the Year, Non-Classical. He also won Album of the Year for producing Adele's 25 in 2017. Additionally, he received two awards for Best Alternative Music Album for producing Vampire Weekend's albums Modern Vampires of the City (2014) and Father of the Bride (2020).

== Albums ==
This is a list of albums produced by Ariel Rechtshaid in its entirety, solo or with other producers.

Album	Year	Artist(s)	Other producers	Ref.
Heads Are Gonna Roll	1999	The Hippos	Mark Trombino	
Dream to Make Believe	2003	Armor for Sleep	None	
The Hippos	2003	The Hippos	None	
All That We Needed	2005	Plain White T's	Loren Israel	
In the Remote Woods (Extended play)	2005	Foreign Born	Other members of Foreign Born	
With Love and Squalor	2005	We Are Scientists	None	
Lie Lover Lie	2006	The Blood Arm	The Blood Arm	
Crap Attack (Compilation)	2006	We Are Scientists	Peter Ducharme (on "The Great Escape Under the Sea")	
On the Wing Now	2007	Foreign Born	Other members of Foreign Born	
Brain Thrust Mastery	2008	We Are Scientists	None	
We All Need a Reason to Believe	2008	Valencia	None	
Person to Person	2009	Foreign Born	Other members of Foreign Born	
Catacombs	2009	Cass McCombs	Cass McCombs	
Barbara	2010	We Are Scientists	None	
Ring	2010	Glasser	Glasser	
Wit's End	2011	Cass McCombs	Cass McCombs	
You Are All I See	2011	Active Child	Active Child	
Humor Risk	2011	Cass McCombs	Cass McCombs; John Webster Johns (on "Mariah")	
Coastal Grooves	2011	Blood Orange	None	
Night Time, My Time	2013	Sky Ferreira	Justin Raisen (co.)	
Modern Vampires of the City	2013	Vampire Weekend	Rostam Batmanglij	
The Desired Effect	2015	Brandon Flowers	Brandon Flowers	
Something to Tell You	2017	Haim	Rostam Batmanglij; Twin Shadow; BloodPop (add.)	
Father of the Bride	2019	Vampire Weekend	Ezra Koenig; BloodPop; DJ Dahi; Rostam Batmanglij	
Women in Music Pt. III	2020	Haim	Danielle Haim; Rostam Batmanglij	
Tell Me That It's Over	2022	Wallows	Cole Preston (add.); John DeBold (add.)	
Only God Was Above Us	2024	Vampire Weekend	Ezra Koenig; Chris Tomson; Rostam Batmanglij	
TBA	2027	Keane	TBA	

== Songs ==
This is a list of song recordings written and/or produced by Ariel Rechtshaid.

Song	Writers	Producers	Album	Year	Ref.
"2nd Round" (Usher)	Usher; Diplo; Ariel Rechtshaid; Juan Najera	Diplo; Ariel Rechtshaid; Natural (vocal)	Looking 4 Myself	2012	
"All That" (Carly Rae Jepsen)	Carly Rae Jepsen; Dev Hynes; Ariel Rechtshaid	Dev Hynes; Ariel Rechtshaid	Emotion	2015	
"Altadena" (Kelela)	—N/a	Jam City; Ariel Rechtshaid (add.); Kwes (add.)	Take Me Apart	2017	
"Animal" (Troye Sivan)	Troye Sivan; Leland; Bram Inscore; Allie X Jam City; Ariel Rechtshaid; Buddy Ross	Ariel Rechtshaid; Bram Inscore (co.); Buddy Ross (co.); Jam City (co.); Leland (add.) (vocal); The Haxan Cloak (add.)	Bloom	2018	
"Ashtrays and Heartbreaks" (Snoop Lion featuring Miley Cyrus)	Snoop Lion; Andrew Hershey; Angela Hunte; Diplo; Ariel Rechtshaid	Major Lazer; Ariel Rechtshaid; Dre Skull	Reincarnated	2013	
"Belong to Heaven" (Cass McCombs)	—N/a	Cass McCombs; Ariel Rechtshaid	Heartmind	2022	
"Better" (Kelela)	—N/a	Mocky; Bok Bok; Ariel Rechtshaid; Kwes (add.)	Take Me Apart	2017	
"Better in the Morning" (Little Boots)	Little Boots; Ariel Rechtshaid	Ariel Rechtshaid	Working Girl	2015	
"Bike Dream" (Rostam)	—N/a	Rostam Batmanglij; Ariel Rechtshaid (add.)	Half-Light	2017	
"Bitch I'm Madonna" (Madonna featuring Nicki Minaj)	Madonna; Diplo; Ariel Rechtshaid; Mozella; Toby Gad; Nicki Minaj; Sophie	—N/a	Rebel Heart	2015	
"Black Roses" (Charli XCX)	Charli XCX; Ariel Rechtshaid; Justin Raisen	Ariel Rechtshaid	True Romance	2013	
"Blue Light" (Kelela)	—N/a	Dubbel Dutch; Bok Bok (add.); Ariel Rechtshaid (add.); Terror Danjah (add.); Asma Maroof (add.)	Take Me Apart	2017	
"Boulevard" (Snoop Lion featuring Jahdan Blakkamoore)	Snoop Lion; Diplo; Ariel Rechtshaid; Andrew Hershey; Wayne Henry; Andrew Bain; Jackie Mittoo	Major Lazer; Ariel Rechtshaid; Dre Skull	Reincarnated	2013	
"Bringing the House Down" (Cloves)	Cloves; Starsmith; Ariel Rechtshaid; Justin Parker	Ariel Rechtshaid; Starsmith (co.)	One Big Nothing	2018	
"Call Me" (Cherry Glazerr featuring Portugal. The Man)	—N/a	Ariel Rechtshaid	Non-album single	2019	
"Caroline" (Alex Clare)	—N/a	Switch; Ariel Rechtshaid (co.)	The Lateness of the Hour	2011	
"Cherry Flavored Stomach Ache" (Haim)	Alana Haim; Ariel Rechtshaid	Danielle Haim; Ariel Rechtshaid	Non-album single	2021	
"Climax" (Usher)	Usher; Diplo; Ariel Rechtshaid; Elijah Blake	—N/a	Looking 4 Myself	2012	
"Closer" (Rae Morris)	—N/a	Ariel Rechtshaid	Unguarded	2015	
"Cool to Cry" (MØ)	MØ; Sly; Caroline Ailin; Ariel Rechtshaid; Noonie Bao; Lotus IV	Ariel Rechtshaid; Jam City; Jim-E Stack; Jakob Littauer	Motordrome	2022	
"Days Ahead" (Bruce Hornsby featuring Danielle Haim)	—N/a	Bruce Hornsby; Tony Berg; Ariel Rechtshaid	'Flicted	2022	
"Days Are Gone" (Haim)	—N/a	Haim; Ariel Rechtshaid	Days Are Gone	2013	
"Do You Even Know?" (Rae Morris)	—N/a	Ariel Rechtshaid	Unguarded	2015	
"Doing It" (Charli XCX featuring Rita Ora)	Charli XCX; Ariel Rechtshaid; Jarrad Rogers; Noonie Bao; Burns	Ariel Rechtshaid; Jarrad Rogers	Sucker	2014	
"Don't Go" (Rae Morris)	—N/a	Ariel Rechtshaid	Unguarded	2015	
"Easy Distraction" (James Bay)	James Bay; Brandon Flowers; Ariel Rechtshaid; Tommy King	—N/a	Changes All the Time	2024	
"Enough" (Kelela)	—N/a	Arca; Ariel Rechtshaid (add.); Kwes (add.)	Take Me Apart	2017	
"Falling" (Haim)	—N/a	Haim; Ariel Rechtshaid	Days Are Gone	2013	
"Feel Nothing" (Amen Dunes with Sleaford Mods)	—N/a	Damon McMahon; Ariel Rechtshaid	Non-album single	2021	
"Feel the Thunder" (Haim)	Haim; Ariel Rechtshaid	Ariel Rechtshaid	The Croods: A New Age (Original Motion Picture Soundtrack)	2020	
"For Her" (The Chicks)	The Chicks; Ariel Rechtshaid; Sarah Aarons	—N/a	Gaslighter	2020	
"For You" (Rae Morris)	Rae Morris; Ariel Rechtshaid; Simon Robbs	Ariel Rechtshaid	Unguarded	2015	
"Forever" (Haim)	—N/a	Ludwig Göransson; Haim; Ariel Rechtshaid (add.)	Days Are Gone	2012	
"Friends" (Francis and the Lights featuring Bon Iver and Kanye West)	—N/a	BJ Burton; Francis Farewell Starlite; Justin Vernon; Rostam Batmanglij; Aaron Lammer; Ariel Rechtshaid; Benny Blanco; Cashmere Cat; Kanye West	Farewell, Starlite!	2016	
"Fruit Juice" (Snoop Lion featuring Mr. Vegas)	Snoop Lion; Andrew Bain; Noel Davey; Wayne Henry; Lloyd James; Diplo; Ariel Rechtshaid; Mr. Vegas; Ian Smith	Major Lazer; Ariel Rechtshaid	Reincarnated	2013	
"Get Away" (Snoop Lion featuring Angela Hunte)	Snoop Lion; Elan Atias; Angela Hunte; Diplo; Ariel Rechtshaid	Major Lazer; Ariel Rechtshaid	Reincarnated	2013	
"Go Slow" (Haim)	—N/a	Ludwig Göransson; Haim; Ariel Rechtshaid (add.)	Days Are Gone	2013	
"Golden Boy" (Kylie Minogue)	Ariel Rechtshaid; Justin Raisen; Dan Nigro	Ariel Rechtshaid	Kiss Me Once	2014	
"Gomenasai" (Kelela)	Kelela; Sam Dew; Asma Maroof; Daniel Pineda; Ariel Rechtshaid	MA Nguzu; NA Nguzu (add.); Ariel Rechtshaid (add.)	Hallucinogen	2015	
"The Good Side" (Troye Sivan)	Troye Sivan; Leland; Bram Inscore; Allie X Jam City; Ariel Rechtshaid	Ariel Rechtshaid; Bram Inscore; Jam City (add.); Leland (vocal)	Bloom	2018	
"Hanging On" (Active Child)	Active Child; Ariel Rechtshaid	Ariel Rechtshaid	You Are All I See	2011	
"Hardcore" (August Ponthier)	August Ponthier; Ariel Rechtshaid; Nick Long	Ariel Rechtshaid	Shaking Hands with Elvis	2022	
"Harder Times" (Snoop Lion featuring Jahdan Blakkamoore)	Snoop Lion; Diplo; Ariel Rechtshaid; Ken Boothe; William Cole; Andrew Hershey; Wayne Henry; Andrew Bain	—N/a	Reincarnated	2013	
"Heartbeat" (Carly Rae Jepsen)	Carly Rae Jepsen; Noah Beresin; Ariel Rechtshaid; Asia Whiteacre	Ariel Rechtshaid; Buddy Ross	Dedicated Side B	2020	
"Hello, Hi, Goodbye" (Rita Ora)	The-Dream; Switch; Diplo; Ariel Rechtshaid	—N/a	Ora	2012	
"Here Comes the King" (Snoop Lion featuring Angela Hunte)	Snoop Lion; Raoul Gonzalez; Angela Hunte; Diplo; Ariel Rechtshaid	Major Lazer; Ariel Rechtshaid; 6Blocc	Reincarnated	2013	
"High Dive" (Shaed)	Shaed; Ariel Rechtshaid; Jherek Bischoff	Shaed; Ariel Rechtshaid	High Dive	2020	
"Honey & I" (Haim)	—N/a	Haim; Ariel Rechtshaid	Days Are Gone	2013	
"How Can I" (Charli XCX)	Charli XCX; Ariel Rechtshaid; Justin Raisen	Ariel Rechtshaid	True Romance	2013	
"How Much Is Weed?" (Dominic Fike)	—N/a	Dominic Fike; Ariel Rechtshaid; Jim-E Stack	Sunburn	2023	
"Hummingbird" (Alex Clare)	Alex Clare; Diplo; Switch; Ariel Rechtshaid; Antony Genn; Martin Slattery	Diplo; Switch; Mike Spencer (add.); Ariel Rechtshaid (add.)	The Lateness of the Hour	2011	
"Hush" (Little Boots)	Little Boots; Ariel Rechtshaid	Tim Goldsworthy; Ariel Rechtshaid	Nocturnes	2013	
"I Am Not Afraid" (G Flip)	G Flip; Ariel Rechtshaid; Alister Wright	G Flip; Ariel Rechtshaid	About Us	2019	
"I Believe" (Caroline Polachek)	Caroline Polachek; Danny L Harle; Ariel Rechtshaid	Caroline Polachek; Danny L Harle; Ariel Rechtshaid	Desire, I Want to Turn Into You	2023	
"I Cannot Lie" (Cass McCombs)	—N/a	Ariel Rechtshaid; Chet "JR" White	A Folk Set Apart	2015	
"I Want You to Shake" (Francis and the Lights)	Francis Farewell Starlite; BJ Burton; Benny Blanco; Ariel Rechtshaid; Nate Fox; Nico Segal	Francis Farewell Starlite; BJ Burton; Benny Blanco; Ariel Rechtshaid; Nate Fox; Nico Segal	Farewell, Starlite!	2016	
"I'm Sorry" (Arlo Parks)	Arlo Parks; Ariel Rechtshaid; Buddy Ross	Ariel Rechtshaid; Buddy Ross	My Soft Machine	2023	
"If Only" (Kylie Minogue)	Ariel Rechtshaid; Justin Raisen; Dan Nigro	Ariel Rechtshaid	Kiss Me Once	2014	
"Joel the Lump of Coal" (The Killers featuring Jimmy Kimmel)	—N/a	Ariel Rechtshaid	Don't Waste Your Wishes	2014	
"Karaoke" (Cass McCombs)	—N/a	Cass McCombs; Ariel Rechtshaid	Heartmind	2022	
"Kindness" (MØ)	MØ; Ariel Rechtshaid; Jam City; Jakob Littauer	Ariel Rechtshaid; Jam City; Jim-E Stack; Jakob Littauer	Motordrome	2022	
"Kingdom" (Charli XCX and Simon Le Bon)	—N/a	Ariel Rechtshaid; Rostam Batmanglij	The Hunger Games: Mockingjay – Part 1 (soundtrack)	2014	
"La La La" (Snoop Lion)	Snoop Lion; Diplo; Ariel Rechtshaid; Joelle Clarke; Ken Boothe; William Cole	Major Lazer; Ariel Rechtshaid	Reincarnated	2013	
"Let Me Go" (Haim)	—N/a	Haim; Ariel Rechtshaid	Days Are Gone	2013	
"Lighters Up" (Snoop Lion featuring Mavado and Popcaan)	Snoop Lion; Andrew Bain; Mavado; Wayne Henry; Andrew Hershey; Diplo; Ariel Rechtshaid; Popcaan	—N/a	Reincarnated	2013	
"Lightning" (Charli XCX)	—N/a	Ariel Rechtshaid	Crash	2022	
"Lights" (Hurts)	Hurts; Ariel Rechtshaid; Nick Hodgson	Ariel Rechtshaid	Surrender	2015	
"Lights of Home" (U2)	U2; Haim; Ariel Rechtshaid	—N/a	Songs of Experience	2017	
"Living for Love" (Madonna)	Madonna; Diplo; Mozella; Toby Gad; Ariel Rechtshaid	Madonna; Diplo; Ariel Rechtshaid	Rebel Heart	2014	
"Lock You Up" (Charli XCX)	Charli XCX; Ariel Rechtshaid	Ariel Rechtshaid	True Romance	2013	
"Lost Man" (Jim-E Stack featuring Octavian)	—N/a	Jim-E Stack; Ariel Rechtshaid	EPHEMERA	2020	
"Lost Track" (Haim)	—N/a	Danielle Haim; John DeBold; Ariel Rechtshaid	Non-album single	2022	
"Love You" (Alex Clare)	—N/a	Diplo; Switch; Mike Spencer (add.); Ariel Rechtshaid (add.)	The Lateness of the Hour	2011	
"Moscow Rules" (Liam Gallagher)	—N/a	Andrew Wyatt; Ezra Koenig; Ariel Rechtshaid	C'mon You Know	2022	
"My Song 5" (Haim)	Haim; Ariel Rechtshaid	Haim; Ariel Rechtshaid	Days Are Gone	2013	
"No Guns Allowed" (Snoop Lion featuring Drake and Cori B)	Snoop Lion; Andrew Bain; Zach Condon; Drake; Wayne Henry; Andrew Hershey; Angela Hunte; Diplo; Ariel Rechtshaid	Major Lazer; Ariel Rechtshaid; Dre Skull; Zach Condon	Reincarnated	2013	
"No Other Way" (Shaed)	Shaed; Ariel Rechtshaid	Shaed; Ariel Rechtshaid	High Dive	2020	
"No Way To Relax When You Are On Fire" (Dora Jar)	Dora Jar; John DeBold; Jared Solomon; Scott Zhang; Cole Carmody; Henry Kwapis; Ariel Rechtshaid	—N/a	No Way To Relax When You Are On Fire	2024	
"Nobody" (Hozier)	—N/a	Hozier; Ariel Rechtshaid	Wasteland, Baby!	2019	
"Nobody Gets Me (Like You)" (Wallows)	—N/a	John DeBold; Sachi DiSerafino; Ariel Rechtshaid	Remote	2020	
"Not Knowing" (Rae Morris)	—N/a	Ariel Rechtshaid	Unguarded	2015	
"Nuclear Seasons" (Charli XCX)	Charli XCX; Ariel Rechtshaid; Justin Raisen	Ariel Rechtshaid	True Romance	2011	
"Old Bone" (Wet)	Wet; Ariel Rechtshaid; Shane O'Connell	Ariel Rechtshaid	Non-album single	2019	
"Onanon" (Kelela)	—N/a	Arca; Ariel Rechtshaid (add.)	Take Me Apart	2017	
"Ondine" (Lower Dens)	—N/a	Jana Hunter; Chris Coady; Ariel Rechtshaid (add.)	Escape from Evil	2015	
"Pray to God" (Calvin Harris featuring Haim)	Calvin Harris; Haim; Ariel Rechtshaid	Calvin Harris; Ariel Rechtshaid (add.)	Motion	2014	
"Puppy" (Arlo Parks)	Arlo Parks; Ariel Rechtshaid; Buddy Ross	Ariel Rechtshaid; Buddy Ross	My Soft Machine	2023	
"Push and Shove" (No Doubt featuring Busy Signal and Major Lazer)	Gwen Stefani; Tony Kanal; Tom Dumont; Busy Signal; Diplo; Switch; Ariel Rechtshaid	Mark "Spike" Stent; Major Lazer; Ariel Rechtshaid (add.)	Push and Shove	2012	
"Rebel Way" (Snoop Lion)	Snoop Lion; Andrew Bain; Wayne Henry; Andrew Hershey; Diplo; Ariel Rechtshaid	—N/a	Reincarnated	2013	
"Relationships" (Haim)	Haim; Ariel Rechtshaid; Tobias Jesso Jr. Rostam Batmanglij; Buddy Ross	—N/a	I Quit (album)	2025	
"Relax My Beloved" (Alex Clare)	Alex Clare; Diplo; Switch; Ariel Rechtshaid	Diplo; Switch; Ariel Rechtshaid (add.)	The Lateness of the Hour	2011	
"Remedy" (Snoop Lion featuring Busta Rhymes and Chris Brown)	Snoop Lion; Angela Hunte; Ariel Rechtshaid; Diplo; Busta Rhymes; Andrew Williams; Abdul Wahab Lafta; Johnson Etienne	Major Lazer; Ariel Rechtshaid	Reincarnated	2013	
"Rescue" (James Bay)	—N/a	Ariel Rechtshaid	Oh My Messy Mind	2019	
"Rewind" (Kelela)	Kelela; Jeremiah Raisen; Samuel Obey; Philip Gamble; Ezra Rubin; Ariel Rechtshaid	—N/a	Hallucinogen	2015	
"Ring Off" (Beyoncé)	—N/a	Mike Caren; Beyoncé; Cook Classics (co.); HS87 (Hit-Boy, HazeBanga & Preach Bal4) (add.); Mike Dean (add.); Ariel Rechtshaid (add.); Derek Dixie (add.)	Beyoncé: Platinum Edition	2014	
"Rudy" (Rostam)	—N/a	Rostam Batmanglij; Ariel Rechtshaid (add.)	Half-Light	2017	
"Running If You Call My Name" (Haim)	Haim; Ariel Rechtshaid	Haim; Ariel Rechtshaid	Days Are Gone	2013	
"Running Towards a Place" (The Killers)	Brandon Flowers; Ronnie Vannucci Jr. Ariel Rechtshaid; Tommy King	Ariel Rechtshaid; Shawn Everett; Jonathan Rado	Imploding the Mirage	2020	
"Sanctuary" (Alex Clare)	—N/a	Diplo; Switch; Ariel Rechtshaid (add.)	The Lateness of the Hour	2011	
"Satellite" (Little Boots)	Little Boots; Ariel Rechtshaid	Tim Goldsworthy; Ariel Rechtshaid	Nocturnes	2013	
"Seasons Bloom" (Kacy Hill)	Kacy Hill; John Carroll Kirby; Jim-E Stack; Ariel Rechtshaid	Ariel Rechtshaid; Jim-E Stack; Kacy Hill	Simple, Sweet, and Smiling	2021	
"See Her Out (That's Just Life)" (Francis and the Lights)	—N/a	Francis Farewell Starlite; Justin Vernon; BJ Burton; Aaron Lammer; Benny Blanco; Cashmere Cat; Rostam Batmanglij; Ariel Rechtshaid; Daniel Aged; Eli Kanat	Farewell, Starlite!	2016	
"Set Me Free" (Charli XCX)	Charli XCX; Ariel Rechtshaid; Dimitri Tikovoï	Ariel Rechtshaid; Dimitri Tikovoï	True Romance	2013	
"Sidelines" (Bruce Hornsby and Ezra Koenig featuring Blake Mills)	—N/a	Bruce Hornsby; Tony Berg; Wayne Pooley; Ariel Rechtshaid	'Flicted	2022	
"Skin" (Rae Morris)	—N/a	Ariel Rechtshaid	Unguarded	2015	
"So Good" (Dove Cameron)	Dove Cameron; Ariel Rechtshaid; Julia Michaels; Justin Tranter; Tommy King	Ariel Rechtshaid	Non-album single	2019	
"So Long" (Snoop Lion featuring Angela Hunte)	Snoop Lion; Laurent Alfred; Andrew Bain; David Goldfine; Wayne Henry; Angela Hunte; Diplo; Ariel Rechtshaid	—N/a	Reincarnated	2013	
"Someone Out There" (Rae Morris)	—N/a	Fryars; Ariel Rechtshaid; Fred	Someone Out There	2018	
"Stay Away" (Charli XCX)	Charli XCX; Ariel Rechtshaid	Ariel Rechtshaid	True Romance	2013	
"Stop It" (Theophilus London)	Theophilus London; Ariel Rechtshaid; Edwin Birdsong	Ariel Rechtshaid	Timez Are Weird These Days	2011	
"Strange Birds" (Birdy)	Birdy; Sia Furler; Ariel Rechtshaid	—N/a	Fire Within	2013	
"Sumer" (Rostam)	—N/a	Rostam Batmanglij; Ariel Rechtshaid (add.)	Half-Light	2017	
"Sweet Summer Sweat" (Jim-E Stack featuring Dijon)	Jim-E Stack; Ariel Rechtshaid; Dijon	Jim-E Stack; Ariel Rechtshaid	EPHEMERA	2020	
"Take Me Apart" (Kelela)	—N/a	Al Shux; Jam City; Ariel Rechtshaid (add.); Arca (add.); Loric Sih (add.); Kwes (add.)	Take Me Apart	2017	
"Take My Hand" (Charli XCX)	Charli XCX; Ariel Rechtshaid; Justin Raisen	Ariel Rechtshaid	True Romance	2013	
"This Is My Guitar" (Christopher Owens)	—N/a	Christopher Owens; Ariel Rechtshaid; Jacob Portrait	I Wanna Run Barefoot Through Your Hair	2024	
"This Time" (Rae Morris)	—N/a	Ariel Rechtshaid	Unguarded	2015	
"Thought of You" (Justin Bieber)	Justin Bieber; Ariel Rechtshaid; Diplo; Eric Bellinger	Ariel Rechtshaid; Diplo; Kuk Harrell (vocal)	Believe	2012	
"Tightrope" (Alex Clare)	Alex Clare; Diplo; Switch; Ariel Rechtshaid; Antony Genn; Martin Slattery	Diplo; Switch; Mike Spencer (add.); Ariel Rechtshaid (add.)	The Lateness of the Hour	2011	
"TIME 2" (half•alive)	half•alive Ariel Rechtshaid; Dan Nigro	Ariel Rechtshaid half•alive (add.)	Non-album single	2021	
"To Noise Making (Sing)" (Hozier)	—N/a	Hozier; Ariel Rechtshaid	Wasteland, Baby!	2019	
"Too Close" (Alex Clare)	—N/a	Diplo; Switch; Ariel Rechtshaid (add.)	The Lateness of the Hour	2011	
"Torn Apart" (Snoop Lion featuring Rita Ora)	Snoop Lion; John Hill; Angela Hunte; Diplo; Ariel Rechtshaid; Switch	Major Lazer; John Hill; Ariel Rechtshaid	Reincarnated	2013	
"Unapologetic Bitch" (Madonna)	—N/a	Madonna; Shelco Garcia & Teenwolf; BV; Diplo; Ariel Rechtshaid	Rebel Heart	2015	
"Up All Night" (Alex Clare)	Alex Clare; Diplo; Switch; Ariel Rechtshaid	Diplo; Switch; Mike Spencer (add.); Ariel Rechtshaid (add.)	The Lateness of the Hour	2010	
"Veni Vidi Vici" (Madonna featuring Nas)	Madonna; Diplo; Ariel Rechtshaid; Mozella; Toby Gad; Nas; Joelistics	—N/a	Rebel Heart	2015	
"Waitin" (Kelela)	—N/a	Jam City; Ariel Rechtshaid (add.); Kwes (add.)	Take Me Apart	2017	
"Warning Intruders" (Rostam)	—N/a	Rostam Batmanglij; Ariel Rechtshaid (add.)	Half-Light	2017	
"When I Needed You" (Carly Rae Jepsen)	Carly Rae Jepsen; Nate Campany; Tavish Crowe; Ariel Rechtshaid; Dan Nigro	Ariel Rechtshaid; Dan Nigro (add.)	Emotion	2015	
"When" (Rostam)	—N/a	Rostam Batmanglij; Ariel Rechtshaid (add.)	Half-Light	2017	
"When We Were Young" (Adele)	—N/a	Ariel Rechtshaid	25	2015	
"Whispering" (Alex Clare)	—N/a	Diplo; Switch; Mike Spencer (add.); Ariel Rechtshaid (add.)	The Lateness of the Hour	2011	
"Why Do You Love Me" (Adele)	—N/a	Ariel Rechtshaid	25	2015	
"Why Even Try?" (Theophilus London featuring Sara Quin)	—N/a	Ariel Rechtshaid	Timez Are Weird These Days	2011	
"The Wire" (Haim)	—N/a	Haim; Ariel Rechtshaid	Days Are Gone	2013	
"Without You" (Tobias Jesso Jr.)	—N/a	Ariel Rechtshaid	Goon	2015	
"You're No Good" (Major Lazer featuring Santigold, Vybz Kartel, Danielle Haim and Yasmin)	Diplo; Switch; Santigold; Vybz Kartel; Yasmin; Ariel Rechtshaid	Major Lazer; Ariel Rechtshaid	Free the Universe	2013	
"You're the One" (Charli XCX)	—N/a	Patrik Berger; Ariel Rechtshaid (add.)	True Romance	2012	
