= Snoop Dogg singles discography =

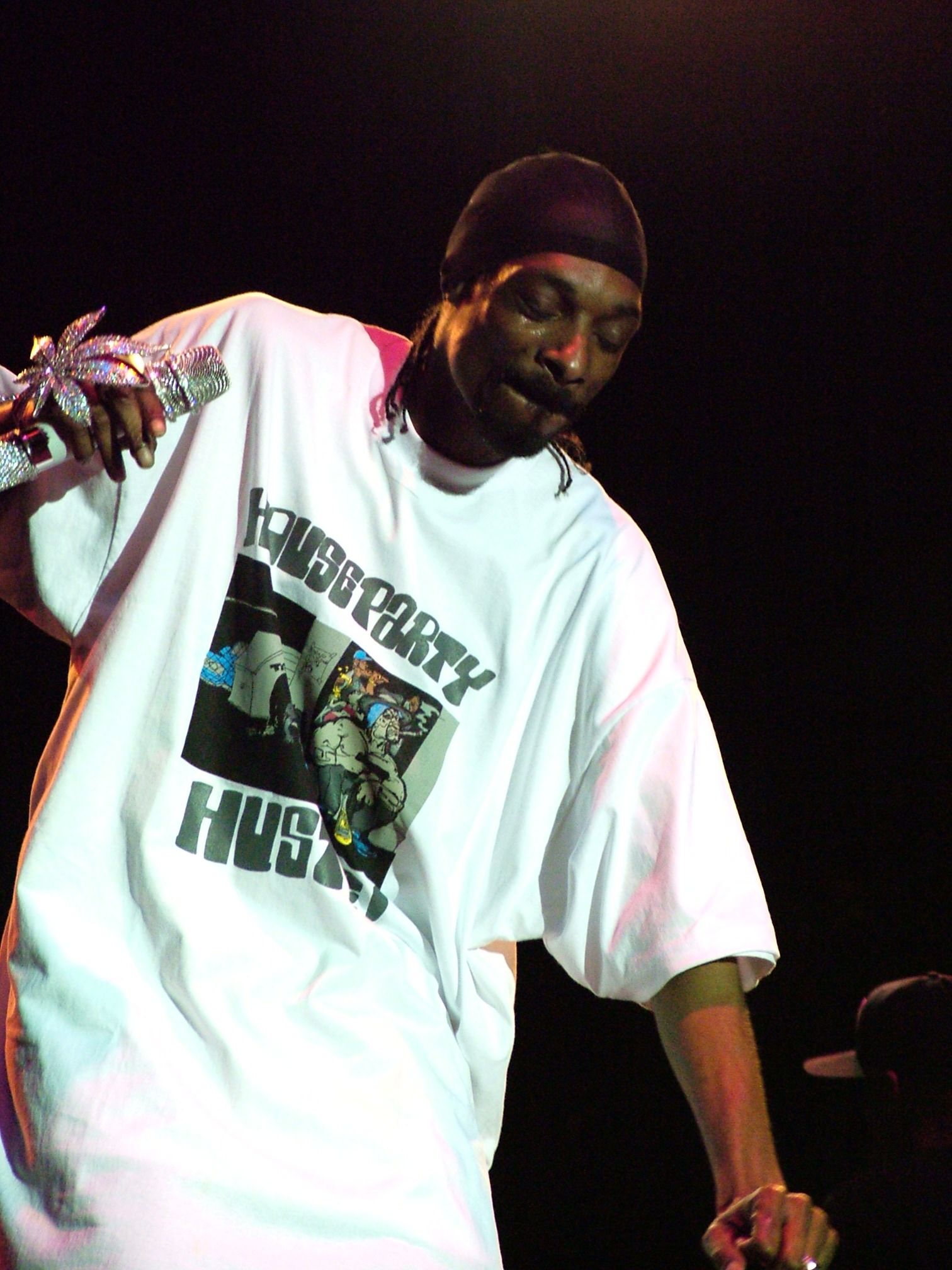
- Snoop Dogg performing at City Stages in March 2006
- As lead artist: 175
- As featured artist: 112
- Promotional singles: 16

The American rapper Snoop Dogg has released 175 singles (including 112 as a featured artist), and 16 promotional singles. He also has garnered 14 top ten singles on the Billboard Hot 100 (including eight as a featured artist).

== As lead artist ==
=== 1990s ===
List of singles as lead artist, with selected chart positions and certifications, showing year released and album name
Title	Year	Peak chart positions										Certifications (sales threshold)	Album
Title	Year	US	US R&B	AUS	BEL	FRA	GER	NL	NZ	SWI	UK	Certifications (sales threshold)	Album
"What's My Name?"	1993	8	8	13	22	11	20	8	4	21	20	RIAA: Gold; BPI: Gold; RMNZ: 2× Platinum	Doggystyle
"Gin and Juice"	1994	8	13	49	—	—	—	—	11	—	39	RIAA: Gold; BPI: Gold; RMNZ: 3× Platinum	Doggystyle
"Doggy Dogg World" (featuring Tha Dogg Pound and The Dramatics)	1994	—	25	—	—	—	—	—	—	—	32		Doggystyle
"Snoop's Upside Ya Head" (featuring Charlie Wilson)	1996	—	37	46	58	—	34	32	7	—	12	RMNZ: Gold	Tha Doggfather
"Vapors" (featuring Teena Marie and Charlie Wilson)	1997	—	—	—	—	—	—	—	7	—	18		Tha Doggfather
"Doggfather"	1997	—	—	—	—	—	—	—	20	—	36		Tha Doggfather
"We Just Wanna Party with You" (featuring Jermaine Dupri)	1997	—	58	28	57	—	82	—	10	—	21		Men in Black: The Album
"Still a G Thang"	1998	19	16	—	—	—	—	—	—	—	—		Da Game Is to Be Sold, Not to Be Told
"Woof" (featuring Fiend and Mystikal)	1999	62	31	—	—	—	—	—	—	—	—		Da Game Is to Be Sold, Not to Be Told
"G Bedtime Stories"	1999	—	—	—	—	—	—	—	—	—	—		No Limit Top Dogg
"Bitch Please" (featuring Xzibit and Nate Dogg)	1999	77	26	—	—	—	—	—	—	—	—	RMNZ: Platinum	No Limit Top Dogg
"—" denotes a recording that did not chart or was not released in that territory.

=== 2000s ===
List of singles as lead artist, with selected chart positions and certifications, showing year released and album name
Title	Year	Peak chart positions										Certifications (sales threshold)	Album
Title	Year	US	US R&B	AUS	BEL	FRA	GER	NL	NZ	SWI	UK	Certifications (sales threshold)	Album
"Snoop Dogg (What's My Name Pt. 2)" (Note: "Snoop Dogg (What's My Name Pt. 2)" and "Lay Low" charted as a double A-side single on the Hot Rap Singles chart in the United States.)	2000	77	20	—	—	—	—	58	—	—	13	BPI: Silver	Tha Last Meal
"Hennesey n Buddah" (featuring Kokane)	2001	—	—	—	—	41	—	—	—	—	—		Tha Last Meal
"Lay Low" (featuring Master P, Nate Dogg, Butch Cassidy and Tha Eastsidaz)	2001	50	8	—	—	81	49	33	—	48	—	RIAA: Gold; RMNZ: Gold	Tha Last Meal
"Just a Baby Boy" (featuring Tyrese and Mr. Tan)	2001	90	40	—	—	—	—	—	—	—	—		Baby Boy (soundtrack)
"Loosen' Control" (featuring Soopafly and Butch Cassidy)	2001	—	—	—	—	—	—	—	—	—	—		Tha Last Meal
"Undercova Funk (Give Up the Funk)" (featuring Mr. Kane, Bootsy Collins, Quaze and Fred Wesley)	2002	—	—	—	—	—	—	—	—	77	—		Undercover Brother (soundtrack)
"From tha Chuuuch to da Palace" (featuring Pharrell)	2002	77	23	—	—	—	75	97	—	—	27		Paid tha Cost to Be da Boss
"Mission Cleopatra" (with Jamel Debbouze)	2002	—	—	—	—	8	—	—	—	—	—	SNEP: Gold	Asterix & Obelix: Mission Cleopatra (soundtrack)
"Beautiful" (featuring Pharrell and Charlie Wilson)	2003	6	3	4	64	39	27	13	4	19	23	RIAA: Platinum; ARIA: Gold; BPI: Gold; RMNZ: 2× Platinum	Paid tha Cost to Be da Boss
"It Blows My Mind"	2003	—	68	—	—	—	—	—	—	—	—		The Neptunes Present... Clones
"Drop It Like It's Hot" (featuring Pharrell)	2004	1	1	4	9	21	8	7	1	3	10	RIAA: 2× Platinum; ARIA: Gold; BPI: Platinum; BVMI: Gold; FIMI: Gold; RMNZ: 3× Platinum	R&G (Rhythm & Gangsta): The Masterpiece
"Let's Get Blown" (featuring Pharrell)	2004	54	19	—	42	—	—	35	19	22	13	RIAA: Platinum	R&G (Rhythm & Gangsta): The Masterpiece
"Signs" (featuring Justin Timberlake and Charlie Wilson)	2005	46	—	1	11	13	3	6	4	5	2	RIAA: Gold; ARIA: Gold; BPI: Platinum; BVMI: Gold; RMNZ: Platinum	R&G (Rhythm & Gangsta): The Masterpiece
"Ups & Downs" (featuring Bee Gees)	2005	—	67	25	3	—	84	78	—	46	36		R&G (Rhythm & Gangsta): The Masterpiece
"Vato" (featuring B-Real)	2006	—	85	55	—	—	—	—	—	—	—		Tha Blue Carpet Treatment
"That's That" (featuring R. Kelly)	2006	20	9	64	—	30	39	73	18	37	38	RMNZ: Gold	Tha Blue Carpet Treatment
"Candy (Drippin' Like Water)" (featuring E-40, MC Eiht, Goldie Loc, Daz Dillinger and Kurupt)	2006	—	—	—	—	—	—	—	—	—	—		Tha Blue Carpet Treatment
"Boss' Life" (featuring Nate Dogg or Akon)	2007	—	65	—	—	—	—	—	—	—	—		Tha Blue Carpet Treatment
"Sensual Seduction"	2007	7	5	52	30	52	15	39	36	10	22	RIAA: Platinum; BPI: Gold	Ego Trippin'
"Neva Have 2 Worry" (featuring Uncle Chucc)	2008	—	—	—	—	—	—	—	—	—	—		Ego Trippin'
"Life of da Party" (featuring Too Short and Mistah F.A.B.)	2008	— (Note: "Life of da Party" did not enter the Billboard Hot 100, but peaked at number 5 on the Bubbling Under Hot 100 Singles chart, which acts as a 25-song extension to the Hot 100.)	48	—	—	—	—	—	—	—	—		Ego Trippin'
"Those Gurlz"	2008	—	91	—	—	—	—	—	—	—	—		Ego Trippin'
"My Medicine" (featuring Willie Nelson)	2008	—	—	—	—	—	—	39	—	—	—		Ego Trippin'
"Gangsta Luv" (featuring The-Dream)	2009	35	24	—	68	—	—	—	13	—	—	RMNZ: Platinum	Malice n Wonderland
"That's tha Homie"	2009	—	—	—	—	—	—	—	—	—	—		Malice n Wonderland
"I Wanna Rock"	2009	41	10	—	—	—	—	—	—	—	—		Malice n Wonderland
"Pronto" (featuring Soulja Boy)	2009	—	—	—	—	—	—	—	—	—	—		Malice n Wonderland
"—" denotes a recording that did not chart or was not released in that territory.

=== 2010s ===
List of singles as lead artist, with selected chart positions and certifications, showing year released and album name
Title	Year	Peak chart positions										Certifications (sales threshold)	Album
Title	Year	US	US R&B	AUS	BEL	FRA	GER	NL	NZ	SWI	UK	Certifications (sales threshold)	Album
"That Tree" (featuring Kid Cudi)	2010	—	—	—	—	—	—	—	—	—	—		More Malice
"Wet" (Note: A remix of the song by David Guetta was released as a single outside the United States.)	2010	— (Note: "Wet" did not enter the Billboard Hot 100, but peaked at number 13 on the Bubbling Under Hot 100 Singles chart, which acts as a 25-song extension to the Hot 100.)	40	1	1	1	2	6	5	2	4	ARIA: 4× Platinum; BPI: Platinum; BVMI: 3× Gold; IFPI SWI: Platinum; RMNZ: Platinum	Doggumentary
"Boom" (featuring T-Pain)	2011	76	— (Note: "Boom" did not enter the Hot R&B/Hip-Hop Songs chart, but peaked at number 4 on the Bubbling Under R&B/Hip-Hop Singles chart, which acts as a 25-song extension to the Hot R&B/Hip-Hop Songs chart.)	40	65	—	—	—	—	—	56		Doggumentary
"Young, Wild & Free" (with Wiz Khalifa featuring Bruno Mars)	2011	7	56	4	9	6	15	11	2	6	44	RIAA: 6× Platinum; ARIA: 5× Platinum; BPI: Gold; BVMI: 5× Gold; IFPI SWI: Gold; MC: 3× Platinum; RMNZ: 6× Platinum	Mac & Devin Go to High School soundtrack
"Here Comes the King" (featuring Angela Hunte)	2012	—	—	—	—	124	—	—	—	—	—		Reincarnated
"Lighters Up" (featuring Mavado and Popcaan)	2012	— (Note: The song did not enter the Billboard Hot 100, but peaked at number 3 on the Reggae Songs chart.)	—	—	29	—	—	—	—	—	195		Reincarnated
"No Guns Allowed" (featuring Drake and Cori B)	2013	— (Note: The song did not enter the Billboard Hot 100, but peaked at number 2 on the Reggae Songs chart.)	58	—	61	—	—	—	—	—	—		Reincarnated
"Ashtrays and Heartbreaks" (featuring Miley Cyrus)	2013	— (Note: The song did not enter the Billboard Hot 100, but peaked at number 1 on the Reggae Songs chart.)	—	—	70	—	—	—	—	—	—		Reincarnated
"Peaches N Cream" (featuring Charlie Wilson)	2015	— (Note: "Peaches N Cream" did not enter the Billboard Hot 100, but peaked at number 16 on the Bubbling Under Hot 100 Singles chart, which acts as a 25-song extension to the Hot 100.)	41	93	3	73	—	13	—	—	58		Bush
"So Many Pros"	2015	—	—	—	—	169	—	—	—	—	—		Bush
"California Roll" (featuring Stevie Wonder)	2015	—	49	—	22	140	—	27	—	—	—		Bush
"Kush Ups" (featuring Wiz Khalifa)	2016	—	—	—	—	199	—	—	—	—	—		Coolaid
"Point Seen Money Gone" (featuring Jeremih)	2016	—	—	—	—	—	—	—	—	—	—		Coolaid
"Promise You This"	2017	—	—	—	—	—	—	—	—	—	—		Neva Left
"Mount Kushmore" (featuring Redman, Method Man and B-Real)	2017	—	—	—	—	—	—	—	—	—	—		Neva Left
"What Is This?" (featuring October London)	2017	—	—	—	—	—	—	—	—	—	—		TBA
"Words Are Few" (featuring B. Slade)	2018	—	—	—	—	—	—	—	—	—	—		Bible of Love
"One More Day" (featuring Charlie Wilson)	2018	—	—	—	—	—	—	—	—	—	—		Bible of Love
"I Wanna Thank Me" (featuring Marknoxx)	2019	—	—	—	—	—	—	—	—	—	—		I Wanna Thank Me
"—" denotes a recording that did not chart or was not released in that territory.

=== 2020s ===
List of singles as lead artist, with selected chart positions, showing year released and album name
Title	Year	Peak chart positions					Certifications	Album
Title	Year	US	US Latin	AUS	NZ Hot	UK	Certifications	Album
"Black Man in America"	2020	—	—	—	—	—		Non-album singles
"CEO"	2021	—	—	—	—	—		From tha Streets 2 tha Suites
"Roaches in My Ashtray"	2021	—	—	—	39	—		From tha Streets 2 tha Suites
"Gorgeous" (with Dr. Dre and Jhené Aiko)	2024	—	—	—	22	—		Missionary
"Outta Da Blue" (with Dr. Dre and Alus)	2024	—	—	—	23	—		Missionary
"Another Part of Me" (with Dr. Dre featuring Sting)	2024	—	—	—	16	—		Missionary
"Gunz In Smoke" (with Dr. Dre featuring Eminem and 50 Cent)	2024	—	—	—	12	—		Missionary
"Me n OG Snoop"	2025	—	—	—	—	—		Iz It a Crime?
"Gifts"	2025	—	—	—	—	—		Non-album single
"Slid Off"	2026	—	—	—	—	—		10 Til' Midnight
"Stop Counting My Poccets"	2026	—	—	—	—	—		10 Til' Midnight
"Step" (featuring Swizz Beatz)	2026	—	—	—	—	—		10 Til' Midnight
"—" denotes a recording that did not chart or was not released in that territory.

== As featured artist ==
=== 1990s ===
List of singles as featured or collaborating artist, with selected chart positions and certifications, showing year released and album name
Title	Year	Peak chart positions										Certifications (sales threshold)	Album
Title	Year	US	US R&B	US Rap	AUS	AUT	GER	IRL	NZ	SWI	UK	Certifications (sales threshold)	Album
"Deep Cover" (Dr. Dre featuring Snoop Doggy Dogg)	1992	—	46	4	—	—	—	—	—	—	—		Deep Cover (soundtrack)
"Nuthin' but a 'G' Thang" (Dr. Dre featuring Snoop Doggy Dogg)	1993	2	1	1	63	—	—	—	39	—	31	RIAA: Platinum; BPI: Gold; RMNZ: 3× Platinum	The Chronic
"Fuck wit Dre Day (And Everybody's Celebratin')" (Dr. Dre featuring Snoop Doggy Dogg)	1993	8	6	13	—	—	—	—	49	—	59	RIAA: Gold	The Chronic
"Afro Puffs" (The Lady of Rage featuring Snoop Doggy Dogg)	1994	57	31	5	—	—	—	—	—	—	—		Above the Rim (soundtrack)
"What Would You Do" (Tha Dogg Pound featuring Snoop Doggy Dogg and Jewell)	1994	—	—	—	—	—	—	—	—	—	—		Murder Was the Case (soundtrack)
"New York, New York" (Tha Dogg Pound featuring Snoop Doggy Dogg)	1995	—	—	—	—	—	—	—	—	—	—		Dogg Food
"2 of Amerikaz Most Wanted" (2Pac featuring Snoop Doggy Dogg)	1996	—	—	—	—	—	—	—	—	—	—	BPI: Silver; RMNZ: 2× Platinum	All Eyez on Me
"Never Leave Me Alone" (Nate Dogg featuring Snoop Dogg)	1996	33	22	—	—	—	—	—	2	—	—		G-Funk Classics, Vol. 1 & 2
"Wanted Dead or Alive" (2Pac and Snoop Doggy Dogg)	1997	—	—	—	41	—	—	—	3	—	16		Gridlock'd (soundtrack)
"Only in California" (Mack 10 featuring Ice Cube and Snoop Dogg)	1998	—	—	—	—	—	—	—	—	—	—		Based on a True Story
"Unify" (Kid Capri featuring Slick Rick and Snoop Dogg)	1998	— (Note: "Unify" did not enter the Billboard Hot 100, but peaked at number 13 on the Bubbling Under Hot 100 Singles chart, which acts as a 25-song extension to the Hot 100.)	62	24	—	—	—	—	—	—	—		Soundtrack to the Streets
"Come and Get with Me" (Keith Sweat featuring Snoop Dogg)	1998	12	6	—	74	—	—	—	16	—	58	RIAA: Gold	Still in the Game
"We Be Puttin' It Down!" (Bad Azz featuring Snoop Dogg)	1999	—	62	8	—	—	—	—	—	—	—		Word on tha Streets
"Cali Chronic" (Harlem World featuring Snoop Dogg)	1999	—	87	—	—	—	—	—	—	—	—		The Movement
"Still D.R.E." (Dr. Dre featuring Snoop Dogg)	1999	23	32	11	—	48	38	14	—	15	6	BPI: 2× Platinum; BVMI: 3× Gold; RMNZ: 7× Platinum	2001
"Chin Check" (N.W.A featuring Snoop Dogg)	1999	—	71	—	—	—	—	—	—	—	—		Next Friday (soundtrack)

=== 2000s ===
List of singles as featured or collaborating artist, with selected chart positions and certifications, showing year released and album name
Title	Year	Peak chart positions										Certifications (sales threshold)	Album
Title	Year	US	US R&B	US Rap	AUS	AUT	GER	IRL	NZ	SWI	UK	Certifications (sales threshold)	Album
"Bow Wow (That's My Name)" (Lil' Bow Wow featuring Snoop Dogg)	2000	21	9	1	6	18	9	13	17	4	6	ARIA: Platinum	Beware of Dog
"Crybaby" (Mariah Carey featuring Snoop Dogg)	2000	28	23	—	—	—	—	—	—	—	—		Rainbow
"The Next Episode" (Dr. Dre featuring Snoop Dogg, Kurupt and Nate Dogg)	2000	23	11	9	—	—	34	11	—	34	3	BPI: 2× Platinum; BVMI: Gold; RMNZ: 4× Platinum	2001
"Ya Style" (Sylk-E. Fyne featuring Snoop Dogg and Bizzy Bone)	2000	—	—	17	—	—	—	—	—	—	—		Tha Cum Up
"Game Don't Wait" (Remix) (Warren G featuring Nate Dogg, Snoop Dogg and Xzibit)	2000	—	58	—	—	—	—	—	—	—	—		I Want It All
"Down for My N's" (C-Murder featuring Magic and Snoop Dogg)	2000	— (Note: "Down for My N's" did not enter the Billboard Hot 100, but peaked at number 11 on the Bubbling Under Hot 100 Singles chart, which acts as a 25-song extension to the Hot 100.)	29	—	—	—	—	—	—	—	—		Trapped in Crime
"WW III" (Ruff Ryders featuring Yung Wun, Scarface, Jadakiss & Snoop Dogg)	2001												Ryde or Die Vol. 2
"You" (Lucy Pearl featuring Snoop Dogg and Q-Tip)	2001	—	64	—	—	—	—	—	—	—	—		Lucy Pearl
"Pop Lockin'" (Silkk the Shocker featuring Snoop Dogg and Goldie Loc)	2001	—	64	—	—	—	—	—	—	—	—		My World, My Way
"Wrong Idea" (Bad Azz featuring Snoop Dogg, Kokane and Lil' ½ Dead)	2001	—	75	—	—	—	—	—	—	—	—		Personal Business
"The Wash" (Dr. Dre featuring Snoop Dogg)	2001	— (Note: "The Wash" did not enter the Billboard Hot 100, but peaked at number 7 on the Bubbling Under Hot 100 Singles chart, which acts as a 25-song extension to the Hot 100.)	43	—	—	—	—	—	—	—	—		The Wash (soundtrack)
"Do U Wanna Roll (Dolittle Theme)" (R.L., Snoop Dogg and Lil' Kim)	2001	84	52	—	—	—	—	—	—	—	—		Dr. Dolittle 2 (soundtrack)
"Welcome to Atlanta" (Coast 2 Coast Remix) (Jermaine Dupri featuring Snoop Dogg, Murphy Lee, P. Diddy, Ludacris)	2002												Instructions
"The Streets" (WC featuring Snoop Dogg and Nate Dogg)	2002	81	43	20	—	—	—	38	—	—	48		Ghetto Heisman
"Bigger Business" (Swizz Beatz featuring Ron Isley, P. Diddy, Birdman, Jadakiss, Snoop Dogg and Cassidy)	2002	—	72	—	—	—	—	—	—	—	—		Swizz Beatz Presents G.H.E.T.T.O. Stories
"Holidae In" (Chingy featuring Ludacris and Snoop Dogg)	2003	3	2	2	13	—	56	27	4	43	35	RIAA: Gold; ARIA: Gold; RMNZ: Gold	Jackpot
"P.I.M.P. (Remix)" (50 Cent featuring Snoop Dogg, Lloyd Banks and Young Buck)	2003	3	2	1	2	12	3	4	2	4	5	RIAA: Gold; ARIA: Platinum; BVMI: 3× Gold; RMNZ: Gold; BPI: Platinum	Get Rich or Die Tryin'
"Red Light-Green Light" (Limp Bizkit featuring Snoop Dogg)	2003	—	—	—	—	—	—	—	—	—	—		Results May Vary
"The Way I Am" (Knoc-turn'al featuring Snoop Dogg)	2004	—	78	—	—	—	—	—	—	—	—		The Way I Am
"S.O.Z." (Soz featuring Snoop Dogg)	2004	—	—	—	—	—	—	—	—	—	—		The Initiative
"I Wanna Thank Ya" (Angie Stone featuring Snoop Dogg)	2004	—	61	—	—	—	—	—	—	—	31		Stone Love
"Why Cry" (Oowee featuring Snoop Dogg)	2005	—	— (Note: "Why Cry" did not enter the Hot R&B/Hip-Hop Songs chart, but peaked at number 13 on the Bubbling Under R&B/Hip-Hop Singles chart, which acts as a 25-song extension to the Hot R&B/Hip-Hop Songs chart.)	—	—	—	—	—	—	—	—		Non-album single
"Don't Stop" (Beanie Sigel featuring Snoop Dogg)	2005	—	67	—	—	—	—	—	—	—	—		The B. Coming
"Blackout" (Note: Two single versions of "Blackout" were released: the first features Nas, and the second features Snoop Dogg.) (Mashonda featuring Nas or Snoop Dogg)	2005	—	96	—	—	—	—	—	—	—	—		January Joy
"Real Soon" (DPGC featuring Snoop Dogg and Nate Dogg)	2005	—	— (Note: "Real Soon" did not enter the Hot R&B/Hip-Hop Songs chart, but peaked at number 3 on the Bubbling Under R&B/Hip-Hop Singles chart, which acts as a 25-song extension to the Hot R&B/Hip-Hop Songs chart.)	—	49	—	—	—	—	—	—		Welcome to tha Chuuch: Da Album
"Say Somethin'" (Mariah Carey featuring Snoop Dogg)	2006	79	—	—	26	—	63	23	—	55	28		The Emancipation of Mimi
"Buttons" (The Pussycat Dolls featuring Snoop Dogg)	2006	3	—	—	2	1	4	4	1	3	3	RIAA: 5× Platinum; ARIA: Platinum; BPI: Platinum; BVMI: Gold; RMNZ: 2× Platinum	PCD
"Keep Bouncin'" (Too Short featuring Snoop Dogg and will.i.am)	2006	—	93	—	—	—	—	—	—	—	—		Blow the Whistle
"Gangsta Zone" (Daddy Yankee featuring Snoop Dogg)	2006	—	—	—	—	—	—	—	—	—	—		Barrio Fino en Directo
"Cali Iz Active" (Tha Dogg Pound featuring Snoop Dogg)	2006	—	— (Note: "Cali Iz Active" did not enter the Hot R&B/Hip-Hop Songs chart, but peaked at number 14 on the Bubbling Under R&B/Hip-Hop Singles chart, which acts as a 25-song extension to the Hot R&B/Hip-Hop Songs chart.)	—	—	—	—	—	—	—	—		Cali Iz Active
"Gangsta Walk" (Coolio featuring Snoop Dogg)	2006	—	—	—	67	75	—	—	—	56	67		The Return of the Gangsta
"Go to Church" (Ice Cube featuring Snoop Dogg and Lil Jon)	2006	— (Note: "Go to Church" did not enter the Billboard Hot 100, but peaked at number 21 on the Bubbling Under Hot 100 Singles chart, which acts as a 25-song extension to the Hot 100.)	67	25	—	—	—	—	—	—	—		Laugh Now, Cry Later
"I Wanna Love You" (Akon featuring Snoop Dogg)	2006	1	3	—	6	29	14	2	2	16	3	RIAA: 6× Platinum; ARIA: 3× Platinum; BPI: Platinum; RMNZ: 3× Platinum	Konvicted
"Hollywood Divorce" (Outkast featuring Snoop Dogg and Lil Wayne)	2006	—	— (Note: "Hollywood Divorce" did not enter the Hot R&B/Hip-Hop Songs chart, but peaked at number 20 on the Bubbling Under R&B/Hip-Hop Singles chart, which acts as a 25-song extension to the Hot R&B/Hip-Hop Songs chart.)	—	—	—	—	—	—	—	—		Idlewild
"That Girl" (Pharrell featuring Snoop Dogg and Charlie Wilson)	2006	—	—	—	—	—	—	—	—	—	—		In My Mind
"Favourite Spot" (Bohemia featuring Snoop Dogg and Sin)	2006	—	—	—	—	—	—	—	—	—	—		Pesa Nasha Pyar
"My 64" (Mike Jones featuring Bun B and Snoop Dogg)	2007	— (Note: "My 64" did not enter the Billboard Hot 100, but peaked at number 1 on the Bubbling Under Hot 100 Singles chart, which acts as a 25-song extension to the Hot 100.)	53	22	—	—	—	—	—	—	—		The American Dream
"What a Job" (Devin the Dude featuring Snoop Dogg and André 3000)	2007	—	— (Note: "What a Job" did not enter the Hot R&B/Hip-Hop Songs chart, but peaked at number 24 on the Bubbling Under R&B/Hip-Hop Singles chart, which acts as a 25-song extension to the Hot R&B/Hip-Hop Songs chart.)	—	—	—	—	—	—	—	—		Waitin' to Inhale
"9mm"} (David Banner featuring Akon, Lil Wayne and Snoop Dogg)	2007	— (Note: "9mm" did not enter the Billboard Hot 100, but peaked at number 15 on the Bubbling Under Hot 100 Singles chart, which acts as a 25-song extension to the Hot 100.)	66	—	—	—	—	—	—	—	—		The Greatest Story Ever Told
"Real Man" (Lexington Bridge featuring Snoop Dogg)	2007	—	—	—	—	66	16	—	—	—	—		The Vibe
"Vibe" (Tha Dogg Pound featuring Snoop Dogg)	2007	—	—	—	—	—	—	—	—	—	—		Dogg Chit
"Ghetto" (Kelly Rowland featuring Snoop Dogg)	2007	—	— (Note: "Ghetto" did not enter the Hot R&B/Hip-Hop Songs chart, but peaked at number 9 on the Bubbling Under R&B/Hip-Hop Singles chart, which acts as a 25-song extension to the Hot R&B/Hip-Hop Songs chart.)	—	—	—	—	—	—	—	—		Ms. Kelly
"Lose Your Life" (The Alchemist featuring Snoop Dogg, Jadakiss and Pusha T)	2008	—	—	—	—	—	—	—	—	—	—		Chemical Warfare
"I'm Toe Up" (Remix) (Problem featuring DJ Felli Fel, DJ Quik, Kurupt, Terrace Martin and Snoop Dogg)	2008	—	—	—	—	—	—	—	—	—	—		Non-album single
"Bottle Pop" (The Pussycat Dolls featuring Snoop Dogg)	2009	—	—	—	17	—	—	—	—	—	—		Doll Domination
"Day Dreaming" (DJ Drama featuring Akon, Snoop Dogg and T.I.)	2009	—	88	—	—	—	—	—	33	—	—		Gangsta Grillz: The Album (Vol. 2)
"I Do" (Lil Jon featuring Snoop Dogg and Swizz Beatz)	2009	—	— (Note: "I Do" did not enter the Hot R&B/Hip-Hop Songs chart, but peaked at number 9 on the Bubbling Under R&B/Hip-Hop Singles chart, which acts as a 25-song extension to the Hot R&B/Hip-Hop Songs chart.)	—	—	—	—	—	—	—	—		Non-album single
"Swagger" (Grandmaster Flash featuring Red Café, Snoop Dogg and Lynda Carter)	2009	—	—	—	—	—	—	—	—	—	—		The Bridge (Concept of a Culture)
"Groove On" (Timati featuring Snoop Dogg)	2009	—	—	—	—	—	62	—	—	—	—		The Boss
"Light My Fire" (Mr. Capone-E featuring Snoop Dogg)	2009	—	—	—	—	—	—	—	—	—	—		Diary of a G
"Dime Piece" (LiLana featuring Snoop Dogg and Big Sha)	2009	—	—	—	—	—	—	—	—	—	—		Non-album single
"Hot Girl" (Belly featuring Snoop Dogg)	2009	—	—	—	—	—	—	—	—	—	—		Back for the First Time Vol. 1 / Sleepless Nights 1.5
"Oh Yeah" (Jaicko featuring Snoop Dogg)	2009	—	— (Note: "Oh Yeah" did not enter the Hot R&B/Hip-Hop Songs chart, but peaked at number 4 on the Bubbling Under R&B/Hip-Hop Singles chart, which acts as a 25-song extension to the Hot R&B/Hip-Hop Songs chart.)	—	—	—	—	—	—	—	—		Can I

=== 2010s ===
List of singles as featured or collaborating artist, with selected chart positions and certifications, showing year released and album name
Title	Year	Peak chart positions											Certifications (sales threshold)	Album
Title	Year	US	US R&B	US Rap	AUS	AUT	FRA	GER	IRL	NZ	SWI	UK	Certifications (sales threshold)	Album
"All I Do Is Win" (DJ Khaled featuring T-Pain, Ludacris, Snoop Dogg and Rick Ross)	2010	24	8	6	—	—	—	—	—	—	—	98	RIAA: 3× Platinum; BPI: Gold; MC: Platinum; RMNZ: Platinum	Victory
"Last Night (Kinkos)" (Omarion featuring Snoop Dogg)	2010	—	88	—	—	—	—	—	—	—	—	—		Ollusion
"California Gurls" (Katy Perry featuring Snoop Dogg)	2010	1	—	—	1	3	—	3	1	1	4	1	RIAA: Diamond; ARIA: 11× Platinum; MC: 4× Platinum; BPI: Platinum; BVMI: Platinum; IFPI AUT: Platinum; IFPI SWI: Platinum; RMNZ: 4× Platinum	Teenage Dream
"Get 'Em Girls" (Jessica Mauboy featuring Snoop Dogg)	2010	—	—	—	19	—	—	—	—	—	—	—		Get 'Em Girls
"Mr. Romeo" (Emii featuring Snoop Dogg)	2010	—	—	—	—	—	—	—	—	—	—	—		Non-album singles
"Kush" (Dr. Dre featuring Snoop Dogg and Akon)	2010	34	43	11	81	—	—	—	—	—	59	57	RMNZ: Gold	Non-album singles
"It's in the Mornin'" (Robin Thicke with Snoop Dogg)	2010	— (Note: "It's in the Mornin'" did not enter the Billboard Hot 100, but peaked at number 17 on the Bubbling Under Hot 100 Singles chart, which acts as a 25-song extension to the Hot 100.)	25	—	—	—	—	—	—	—	—	—		Sex Therapy: The Session
"Boyfriend" (Big Time Rush featuring Snoop Dogg)	2011	72	—	—	—	55	—	49	—	—	—	76	RIAA: Platinum; RMNZ: Gold	B.T.R.
"Mr Endowed" (Remix) (D'banj featuring Snoop Dogg)	2011	—	—	—	—	—	—	—	—	—	—	—		Non-album singles
"Last Night" (Ian Carey featuring Snoop Dogg and Bobby Anthony)	2011	—	—	—	15	—	—	—	—	—	—	—	ARIA: Platinum; MC: Gold	Non-album singles
"If I Was You (OMG)" (Far East Movement featuring Snoop Dogg)	2011	—	—	—	63	—	—	—	—	18	—	—		Free Wired
"Turtleneck & Chain" (The Lonely Island featuring Snoop Dogg)	2011	—	—	—	—	—	—	—	—	—	—	—		Turtleneck & Chain
"The Mack" (Mann featuring Snoop Dogg and Iyaz)	2011	—	—	—	68	—	—	—	—	—	—	28		Mann's World
"I Drink I Smoke" (Belly featuring Snoop Dogg)	2011	—	—	—	—	—	—	—	—	—	—	—		Sleepless Nights 1.5
"I'm Day Dreaming" (Redd featuring Akon and Snoop Dogg)	2012	—	—	—	—	41	—	53	—	—	29	71		Non-album singles
"Never Let U Go" (Kato featuring Snoop Dogg and Brandon Beal)	2012	—	—	—	—	—	—	—	—	—	—	—		Non-album singles
"Slow Motion" (Lee.M and J. Pearl featuring Iyaz and Snoop Dogg)	2012	—	—	—	—	—	—	—	—	—	—	—		Non-album singles
"Emergency" (Audio Playground featuring Snoop Dogg)	2012	—	—	—	—	—	—	—	—	—	—	—		Non-album singles
"Major Distribution" (50 Cent featuring Snoop Dogg and Young Jeezy)	2013	— (Note: "Major Distribution" did not enter the Billboard Hot 100, but peaked at number 13 on the Bubbling Under Hot 100 Singles chart, which acts as a 25-song extension to the Hot 100.)	43	—	—	—	—	—	—	—	—	166		Non-album singles
"That Kinda Girl" (RC & The Gritz featuring Snoop Dogg and Raheem DeVaughn)	2013	—	—	—	—	—	—	—	—	—	—	—		Non-album singles
"Red Light" (Eddie Murphy featuring Snoop Lion)	2013	—	—	—	—	—	—	—	—	—	—	—		9
"Dynamite" (Afrojack featuring Snoop Dogg)	2014	—	—	—	—	—	—	—	—	—	—	—		Forget the World
"Wiggle" (Jason Derulo featuring Snoop Dogg)	2014	5	3	—	3	4	—	6	10	9	8	8	RIAA: 3× Platinum; ARIA: 3× Platinum; BPI: Platinum; BVMI: Gold; IFPI AUT: Gold; IFPI SWI: Gold; RMNZ: Platinum	Talk Dirty
"Hangover" (Psy featuring Snoop Dogg)	2014	26	—	3	—	—	—	—	—	—	—	—		Non-album single
"Summer Time" (Jike Junyi featuring Snoop Dogg)	2014	—	—	—	—	—	—	—	—	—	—	—		吉克隽逸 (Jike Junyi)
"You and Your Friends" (Wiz Khalifa featuring Ty Dolla Sign and Snoop Dogg)	2014	82	21	18	—	—	—	—	—	—	—	—	RIAA: Gold	Blacc Hollywood
"Stuck on a Feeling" (Prince Royce featuring Snoop Dogg)	2014	43	—	—	34	—	—	—	—	—	—	—	RIAA: Gold	Double Vision
"Dumb Shit" (Tyrese featuring Snoop Dogg)	2015	—	—	—	—	—	—	—	—	—	—	—		Black Rose
"Koko yö" (Elastinen featuring Snoop Dogg)	2015	—	—	—	—	—	—	—	—	—	—	—		Iso kuva
"My Cutie Pie" (Lil Jon featuring T-Pain, Problem & Snoop Dogg)	2015	—	—	—	—	—	—	—	—	—	—	—		Non-album single
"Professional Rapper" (Lil Dicky featuring Snoop Dogg)	2015	—	—	—	—	—	—	—	—	—	—	—	RIAA: Gold; RMNZ: Gold	Professional Rapper
"Flip It" (Charlotte Devaney featuring Snoop Dogg)	2015	—	—	—	12	—	—	—	—	—	—	—	ARIA: Gold	Non-album single
"No Social Media" (Wiz Khalifa featuring Snoop Dogg)	2015	—	—	—	—	—	—	—	—	—	—	—		Rolling Papers 2: The Weed Album
"Smoke Bomb" (Datsik featuring Snoop Dogg)	2015	—	—	—	—	—	—	—	—	—	—	—		Non-album single
"No Pressure" (Classified featuring Snoop Dogg)	2015	—	—	—	—	—	—	—	—	—	—	—		Greatful
"Problematic" (Ricky Dillon featuring Snoop Dogg)	2016	—	—	—	—	—	—	—	—	—	—	—		Gold
"Do the Damn Thang" (Da YoungFellaz featuring Snoop Dogg, George Clinton & Nipsey Hussle)	2016	—	—	—	—	—	—	—	—	—	—	—		Non-album single
"Westside" (Fetty Wap featuring Snoop Dogg)	2016	—	—	—	—	—	—	—	—	—	—	—		King Zoo
"OMG" (Arash featuring Snoop Dogg)	2016	—	—	—	—	—	—	—	—	—	—	—		Non-album singles
"Get It Get It" (Savant featuring DMX & Snoop Dogg)	2016	—	—	—	—	—	—	—	—	—	—	—		Non-album singles
"All the Way Up (Westside Remix)" (Fat Joe and Remy Ma featuring French Montana, Infared, Snoop Dogg, The Game and E-40)	2016	27	9	—	—	—	85	—	—	—	—	157	RIAA: 2× Platinum; BPI: Silver; SNEP: Platinum	Plata O Plomo
"California Dreaming" (Arman Cekin featuring Snoop Dogg & Paul Rey)	2017	—	—	—	—	—	—	—	—	—	—	—		Non-album singles
"Way Back" (TLC featuring Snoop Dogg)	2017	—	—	—	—	—	—	—	—	—	—	—		TLC
"I'm On 3.0" (Trae tha Truth featuring T.I., Dave East, Tee Grizzley, Royce da 5'9", Curren$y, DRAM, Snoop Dogg, Fabolous, Rick Ross, Chamillionaire, G-Eazy, Styles P, E-40, Mark Morrison and Gary Clark, Jr.)	2017	—	—	—	—	—	—	—	—	—	—	—		Tha Truth, Pt. 3
"Woofer" (Dr. Zeus featuring Snoop Dogg, Zora Randhawa and Nargis Fakhri)	2017	—	—	—	—	—	—	—	—	—	—	—		Global Injection
"Lil Bit" (Bobby V featuring Snoop Dogg)	2018	—	—	—	—	—	—	—	—	—	—	—		Electrik
"Smile (Living My Best Life)" (Lil Duval featuring Snoop Dogg and Ball Greezy)	2018	56	25	23	—	—	—	—	—	—	—	—	RIAA: Gold	Non-album single
"Top of the World (remix)" (Kimbra featuring Snoop Dogg)	2018	—	—	—	—	—	—	—	—	— (Note: "Top of the World" did not enter the NZ Top 40 Singles Chart, but peaked at number 1 on the NZ Artists Heatseeker Singles Chart.)	—	—		Primal Heart
"Bounce" (Dimitri Vegas & Like Mike vs. Julian Banks and Bassjackers featuring Snoop Dogg)	2018	—	—	—	—	—	—	—	—	—	—	—		Non-album singles
"Bang With The O" (Steff Da Campo featuring Snoop Dogg)	2018	—	—	—	—	—	—	—	—	—	—	—		Non-album singles
"Moves" (Olly Murs featuring Snoop Dogg)	2018	—	—	—	—	—	—	—	—	—	—	46	BPI: Silver	You Know I Know
"How You Love Me" (Hardwell featuring Conor Maynard and Snoop Dogg)	2018	—	—	—	—	—	—	—	—	—	—	—		Non-album singles
"Sirens" (Kaan featuring Snoop Dogg and Eleni Foureira)	2019	—	—	—	—	—	—	—	—	—	—	—		Non-album singles
"Give It to Me" (Sơn Tùng M-TP featuring Snoop Dogg)	2019	—	—	—	—	—	—	—	—	—	—	—		Non-album singles
"International Love" (ADL featuring Snoop Dogg)	2019	—	—	—	—	—	—	—	—	—	—	—		Non-album singles
"Hallelujah" (Ray J featuring Snoop Dogg)	2019	—	—	—	—	—	—	—	—	—	—	—		Non-album singles
"—" denotes a recording that did not chart or was not released in that territory.

=== 2020s ===
List of singles as featured or collaborating artist, with selected chart positions and certifications, showing year released and album name
Title	Year	Peak chart positions						Certifications (sales threshold)	Album
Title	Year	US	US R&B	US Latin	AUS	NZ Hot	UK	Certifications (sales threshold)	Album
"Respect My Cryppin' (Remix)" (Blueface featuring Snoop Dogg)	2020	—	—	—	—	—	—		Famous Cryp Reloaded
"Callin" (YoungBoy Never Broke Again featuring Snoop Dogg)	2020	— (Note: "Callin" did not chart on the Billboard Hot 100, but peaked at number 3 on the Bubbling Under Hot 100 Singles chart.)	42	—	—	—	—	RIAA: Gold	Top
"Mi Tío Snoop" (Alemán featuring Snoop Dogg)	2020	—	—	—	—	—	—		Non-album singles
"Qué Maldición" (Banda MS and Snoop Dogg)	2020	— (Note: "Que Maldicion" did not enter the Billboard Hot 100, but peaked at number 1 on the Bubbling Under Hot 100 Singles chart.)	—	4	—	—	—	RIAA: 9× Platinum (Latin)	Non-album singles
"Grandes Ligas" (Lupillo Rivera, Alemán and Santa Fe Klan featuring Snoop Dogg and B-Real)	2021	—	—	—	—	—	—		Non-album singles
"We Dem" (OSB Feezy and AyoChungking featuring Snoop Dogg)	2021	—	—	—	—	—	—		Non-album singles
"Peaches" (Remix) (Justin Bieber featuring Ludacris, Usher, and Snoop Dogg)	2021	—	—	—	—	—	—		Non-album singles
"Dim My Light" (Problem and Snoop Dogg)	2021	—	—	—	—	—	—		Non-album singles
"From the D 2 the LBC" (Eminem and Snoop Dogg)	2022	72	—	—	64	7	51		Curtain Call 2
"Bad Decisions" (Benny Blanco, BTS and Snoop Dogg)	2022	10	—	—	31	3	53	RIAA: Gold	Non-album single
"Satellite" (Bebe Rexha and Snoop Dogg)	2023	—	—	—	—	—	—		Bebe
"High Rise" (Sleepy Brown featuring Snoop Dogg)	2024	—	—	—	—	—	—		Non-album singles

== Promotional singles ==
List of promotional singles, with selected chart positions, showing year released and album name
Title	Year	Peak chart positions		Certifications	Album
Title	Year	US R&B	BEL	Certifications	Album
"G's Iz G's" (Remix) (Tash featuring Snoop Dogg, Kurupt and Xzibit)	2000	—	—		—N/a
"Bitch Please II" (Eminem featuring Dr. Dre, Nate Dogg, Snoop Dogg and Xzibit)	2000	61	—	RIAA: Gold; ARIA: Platinum; RMNZ: 2× Platinum	The Marshall Mathers LP
"Double Up" (R. Kelly featuring Snoop Dogg)	2007	— (Note: "Double Up" did not enter the Hot R&B/Hip-Hop Songs chart, but peaked at number 1 on the Bubbling Under R&B/Hip-Hop Singles chart, which acts as a 25-song extension to the Hot R&B/Hip-Hop Songs chart.)	—		Double Up
"Ice Cream Paint Job" (West Coast Remix) (Dorrough featuring Snoop Dogg, Nipsey Hussle, Soulja Boy, E-40 and Jim Jones)	2009	—	—		—N/a
"Ghetto Commandments" (T-Pain featuring Snoop Dogg and Mack Maine)	2010	—	—		Freaknik: The Musical soundtrack
"New Year's Eve" (featuring Marty James)	2010	66	—		Doggumentary
"She Smashed the Homie" (E-40 featuring Snoop Dogg and Ray J)	2010	—	—		—N/a
"Black and Yellow" (G-Mix) (Wiz Khalifa featuring Juicy J, Snoop Dogg and T-Pain)	2010	—	—		—N/a
"Gangbang Rookie"	2011	—	—		Doggumentary
"Oh Yeah" (Chris Brown featuring Snoop Dogg and 2 Chainz)	2012	—	—		Fortune
"La La La"	2012	—	71		Reincarnated
"Ain't Worried About Nothin'" (Remix) (French Montana featuring Diddy, Rick Ross and Snoop Dogg)	2013	—	—		—N/a
"Back Up"	2015	—	—		Beach City
"I'm from Long Beach"	2015	—	—		—N/a
"Late Nights"	2016	—	—		—N/a
"U Name It Holiday Anthem" (featuring Battlecat, & Shirley Caesar)	2016	—	—		
"—" denotes a recording that did not chart.

== Other charted and certified songs ==
List of songs, with selected chart positions, showing year released and album name
Title	Year	Peak chart positions							Certifications	Album
Title	Year	US	US R&B	BEL	FRA	GER	SWI	NZ Hot	Certifications	Album
"Lodi Dodi"	1994	— (Note: "Lodi Dodi" did not enter the Billboard Hot 100, but peaked at number 63 on the Hot 100 Airplay chart.)	—	—	—	—	—	—		Doggystyle
"Murder Was the Case"	1994	— (Note: "Murder Was the Case" did not enter the Billboard Hot 100, but peaked at number 67 on the Hot 100 Airplay chart.)	—	—	—	—	—	—		Doggystyle
"Ain't No Fun (If the Homies Can't Have None)" (featuring Nate Dogg, Warren G and Kurupt)	1994	—	—	—	—	—	—	—	RMNZ: Platinum	Doggystyle
"All About U" (2Pac featuring Snoop Doggy Dogg, Nate Dogg and Dru Down)	1996	—	—	—	—	—	—	—	RMNZ: Platinum	All Eyez on Me
"Santa Claus Goes Straight to the Ghetto" (featuring Daz Dillinger, Nate Dogg, Tray Deee and Bad Azz)	1996	—	— (Note: "Santa Claus Goes Straight to the Ghetto" did not enter the Billboard Hot R&B/Hip-Hop Songs, but peaked at number 75 on the Hot R&B/Hip-Hop Airplay chart.)	—	—	—	—	—		Christmas on Death Row
"Midnight Love" (featuring Daz Dillinger and Raphael Saadiq)	1997	—	— (Note: "Midnight Love" did not enter the Billboard Hot R&B/Hip-Hop Songs, but peaked at number 69 on the Hot R&B/Hip-Hop Airplay chart.)	—	—	—	—	—		—N/a
"Feels So Good" (Eastsiders featuring Snoop Dogg)	1998	—	— (Note: "Feels So Good" did not enter the Hot R&B/Hip-Hop Songs chart, but peaked at number 6 on the Bubbling Under R&B/Hip-Hop Singles chart, which acts as a 25-song extension to the Hot R&B/Hip-Hop Songs chart.)	—	—	—	—	—		Ride soundtrack
"I Can't Take The Heat" (with Mia X)	1998	41	32	—	—	—	—	—		Da Game Is to Be Sold, Not to Be Told
"Snoopafella"	1999	—	— (Note: "Snoopafella" did not enter the Hot R&B/Hip-Hop Songs chart, but peaked at number 16 on the Bubbling Under R&B/Hip-Hop Singles chart, which acts as a 25-song extension to the Hot R&B/Hip-Hop Songs chart.)	—	—	—	—	—		No Limit Top Dogg
"Fuck You" (Dr. Dre featuring Snoop Dogg and Devin the Dude)	1999	—	61	—	—	—	—	—	RMNZ: Platinum	2001
"WW III" (with Yung Wun, Scarface and Jadakiss)	2000	—	77	—	—	—	—	—		Ryde or Die Vol. 2
"Ladies & Gents" (Angie Martinez featuring Snoop Dogg)	2001	—	— (Note: "Ladies & Gents" did not enter the Hot R&B/Hip-Hop Songs chart, but peaked at number 17 on the Bubbling Under R&B/Hip-Hop Singles chart, which acts as a 25-song extension to the Hot R&B/Hip-Hop Songs chart.)	—	—	—	—	—		Up Close and Personal
"Paper'd Up" (featuring Kokane and Traci Nelson)	2002	—	—	—	58	—	—	—		Paid tha Cost to Be da Boss
"Doh Doh" (featuring Soopafly, E. White and Mr. Kane)	2002	—	121	—	—	—	—	—		Doggy Style Allstars Vol. 1
"Dance with Me" (with Marvin Gaye)	2003	—	— (Note: "Dance with Me" did not enter the Hot R&B/Hip-Hop Songs chart, but peaked at number 23 on the Bubbling Under R&B/Hip-Hop Singles chart, which acts as a 25-song extension to the Hot R&B/Hip-Hop Songs chart.)	—	—	—	—	—		True Crime: Streets of LA soundtrack
"Girl Like U" (featuring Nelly)	2004	—	— (Note: "Girl Like U" did not enter the Hot R&B/Hip-Hop Songs chart, but peaked at number 15 on the Bubbling Under R&B/Hip-Hop Singles chart, which acts as a 25-song extension to the Hot R&B/Hip-Hop Songs chart.)	—	—	—	—	—		R&G (Rhythm & Gangsta): The Masterpiece
"Happy Summertime" (R. Kelly featuring Snoop Dogg)	2005	—	— (Note: "Happy Summertime" did not enter the Hot R&B/Hip-Hop Songs chart, but peaked at number 19 on the Bubbling Under R&B/Hip-Hop Singles chart, which acts as a 25-song extension to the Hot R&B/Hip-Hop Songs chart.)	—	—	—	—	—		TP.3 Reloaded
"Imagine" (featuring D'Angelo and Dr. Dre)	2006	—	— (Note: "Imagine" did not enter the Hot R&B/Hip-Hop Songs chart, but peaked at number 7 on the Bubbling Under R&B/Hip-Hop Singles chart, which acts as a 25-song extension to the Hot R&B/Hip-Hop Songs chart.)	—	—	—	—	—		Tha Blue Carpet Treatment
"Platinum" (featuring R. Kelly)	2011	—	60	—	—	—	—	—		Doggumentary
"Smokin' On" (with Wiz Khalifa, featuring Juicy J)	2011	— (Note: "Smokin' On" did not enter the Billboard Hot 100, but peaked at number 17 on the Bubbling Under Hot 100 Singles chart, which acts as a 25-song extension to the Hot 100.)	—	—	—	—	—	—		Mac & Devin Go to High School
"Bad Mutha" (Verse Simmonds featuring Snoop Dogg)	2012	—	— (Note: "Bad Mutha" did not enter the Hot R&B/Hip-Hop Songs chart, but peaked at number 12 on the Bubbling Under R&B/Hip-Hop Singles chart, which acts as a 25-song extension to the Hot R&B/Hip-Hop Songs chart.)	—	—	—	—	—		Sex, Love & Hip Hop
"La La La"	2012	—	—	21	—	—	—	—		Reincarnated
"Smoke the Weed" (featuring Collie Buddz)	2013	—	—	—	—	78	60	—		Reincarnated
"Torn Apart" (featuring Rita Ora)	2013	—	—	44	—	—	—	—		Reincarnated
"Institutionalized" (Kendrick Lamar featuring Bilal, Anna Wise and Snoop Dogg)	2015	99	35	—	—	—	—	—		To Pimp a Butterfly
"Pain" (De La Soul featuring Snoop Dogg)	2016	—	—	49	—	—	—	—		And the Anonymous Nobody...
"Best Life" (Lil Duval featuring Snoop Dogg and Ball Greezy)	2016	83	—	—	—	—	—	—		—N/a
"Holiday" (Calvin Harris featuring Snoop Dogg, John Legend and Takeoff)	2017	—	—	—	174	—	—	—		Funk Wav Bounces Vol. 1
"That's My Nigga" (with Meek Mill and YG)	2017	—	—	—	—	—	—	—	RMNZ: Platinum	Bright: The Album
"Dope Niggaz” (Lil Wayne featuring Snoop Dogg)	2018	39	27	—	—	—	—	—		Tha Carter V
"Beauty in the Benz" (Tory Lanez featuring Snoop Dogg)	2019	87	40	—	—	—	—	—		Chixtape 5
"Last Dance with Mary Jane" (with Dr. Dre and Jelly Roll)	2024	—	—	—	—	—	—	9		Missionary
"Thank You" (with Dr. Dre)	2024	—	—	—	—	—	—	20		Missionary
"—" denotes a recording that did not chart.

== Production discography ==
List of production and songwriting credits (excluding features, interpolations, and samples)
Track(s)	Year	Credit	Artist(s)	Album
8. "A Nigga wit a Gun"	1992	Songwriter	Dr. Dre	The Chronic
8. "This D.J."	1994	Songwriter	Warren G	Regulate... G Funk Era
"Beware Of My Crew"	1995	Producer (with LT Hutton)	LBC Crew	Non-album single
1. "Santa Claus Goes Straight to The Ghetto"	1996	Producer	Snoop Doggy Dogg	Christmas on Death Row
15. "(O.J.) Wake Up"	1996	Producer	Snoop Doggy Dogg	Tha Doggfather
"Ride On (Caught Up)"	1997	Producer	Snoop Doggy Dogg, Kurupt	—N/a
3. "G-Funk"; (featuring Isaac Reese and Nanci Fletcher)	1997	Producer (with LT Hutton)	Nate Dogg	G-Funk Classics, Vol. 1 & 2
9. "Dirty Ho's Draws"; (featuring Big Chuck, L.T. Hutton, Salim and Val Young)	1997	Producer (with LT Hutton)	Nate Dogg	G-Funk Classics, Vol. 1 & 2
D2; 6. "Almost In Love" (featuring Isaac Reese)	1997	Producer (with LT Hutton)	Nate Dogg	G-Funk Classics, Vol. 1 & 2
12. "D.O.G.'s Get Lonely Too"	1998	Producer	Snoop Dogg	Da Game Is to Be Sold, Not to Be Told
17. "Pay For P..."	1998	Producer	Snoop Dogg	Da Game Is to Be Sold, Not to Be Told
"Midnight Love"	1998	Producer	Snoop Dogg	—N/a
"Caught Up"	1998	Producer	Snoop Dogg	—N/a
11. "LBC and the ING" (featuring Snoop Dogg)	1998	Producer	Mack 10	The Recipe
8. "Don't Be Foolish"	2001	Producer	Daz Dillinger	Who Ride wit Us: Tha Compalation, Vol. 1
16. "Suited N Booted"	2002	Producer	Snoop Dogg	Paid tha Cost to Be da Boss
"Doh' Doh"	2002	Producer	Doggy Style Allstars	—N/a
19. "Church" (featuring Don Magic Juan)	2004	Producer	Pomona City Rydaz	Walking Game
17. "All Hang Out"	2007	Producer	J-Ro	Rare Earth B-Boy Funk
2. "Overdue"	2007	Producer	RBX	Broken Silence
5. "Neva Have 2 Worry"	2008	Producer (with Terrace Martin)	Snoop Dogg	Ego Trippin'
14. "Been Around the World"	2008	Producer (with Terrace Martin)	Snoop Dogg	Ego Trippin'
1. "Intro"	2009	Producer	Snoop Dogg	Malice N Wonderland
12. "Outro"	2009	Producer	Snoop Dogg	Malice N Wonderland
7. "U Should Know Better" (featuring Snoop Dogg)	2010	Producer	Robyn	Body Talk Pt. 2
9. "Malice N Wonderland: The Movie"	2010	Producer	Snoop Dogg	More Malice
3. "Out The Moon" (featuring Soopafly)	2010	Producer (with LT Hutton and DJ Pooh)	LBC Crew	Haven't You Heard
4. "Get Up 2 Get Down" (featuring Lil J, Sho Shot and Shorty K)	2010	Producer (with LT Hutton and DJ Pooh)	LBC Crew	Haven't You Heard
5. "Feels Good to be DPG"	2010	Producer (with LT Hutton and DJ Pooh)	LBC Crew	Haven't You Heard
11. "I'll Smoke to Dat"	2010	Producer (with LT Hutton and DJ Pooh)	LBC Crew	Haven't You Heard
All tracks	2014	Producer, executive producer	IZA Lach	Flower in the Jungle

== See also ==
- 213 discography
- Tha Eastsidaz discography
- Snoop Dogg filmography
