= That's My Work, Volume 1 =

Mixtape by Snoop Dogg and Tha Dogg Pound
- Released: November 27, 2012
- Recorded: 2012
- Genre: Hip hop
- Length: 73:02
- Label: Doggystyle, Gangsta Gangsta Online Distribution

Snoop Dogg chronology
Stoner's EP (2012)	That's My Work, Vol. 1 (2012)	Reincarnated (2013)

Singles from That's My Work, Volume 1
- 1. "That's My Work" Released: November 27, 2012

That's My Work, Volume 1 is a collaborative mixtape by American rappers Snoop Dogg, Tha Dogg Pound, and others. It was released free for digital download via SoundCloud on November 27, 2012. It is the first mixtape in the That's My Work series, being followed by That's My Work 2 in 2013.

== Track listing ==
No.	Title	Artist	Length
1.	"Intro"	Tha Dogg Pound	5:13
2.	"Gotta Hustle"	Snoop Dogg featuring The Hustle Boyz & Pilot P	4:09
3.	"Taste"	Pac Div	4:22
4.	"The Hood"	Daz Dillinger	3:55
5.	"Funny Hoes"	Mac Lucci featuring Snoop Dogg	4:00
6.	"Keep a Nigga High" (produced by League of Starz)	Snoop Dogg featuring Daz Dillinger	3:27
7.	"U Hear Me"	Mac Shawn 100	4:02
8.	"In Dank We Trust" (produced by Soopafly)	Spanky Danky featuring Kurupt	3:54
9.	"We Came Here to Party"	Soopafly featuring Speak Lo	3:24
10.	"Keepit Craccn Like"	Snoop Dogg featuring Kreayshawn & V-Nasty	4:29
11.	"Goin Gorilla"	Daz Dillinger	3:33
12.	"Getta Grip"	Snoop Dogg featuring Kurupt	3:06
13.	"Fuc Yo Crew"	Soopafly	3:43
14.	"We Gonna Do It Again"	Snoop Dogg featuring Dom Kennedy	4:04
15.	"Why They Call U Bitch"	AV featuring Kurupt	2:43
16.	"All Around the World"	Tha Dogg Pound	4:24
17.	"Executive Branch"	Snoop Dogg	2:39
18.	"Take a Hike"	The 9inch Dix	3:31
19.	"Chicken Outro"		4:17
Total length:			73:02
