= Lighters Up =

Lighters Up may refer to:

- Lighters Up (Lil' Kim song)
- Lighters Up (Snoop Dogg song)
