= A (Cass McCombs album) =

Studio album by Cass McCombs
- Released: May 20, 2003
- Recorded: 2001–2003
- Genre: Rock, folk
- Length: 46:45
- Label: Monitor Records

Cass McCombs chronology
Not the Way (2002)	A (2003)	PREfection (2005)

Professional ratings
Review scores
Source	Rating
AllMusic	4/5 stars
Pitchfork	7.7/10

A is the debut studio album by Cass McCombs. It was released on May 20, 2003, via Monitor Records.

== Track listing ==
No.	Title	Length
1.	"I Went to the Hospital"	5:14
2.	"Bobby, King of Boys Town"	3:47
3.	"What Isn't Nature"	4:48
4.	"Aids in Africa"	5:42
5.	"A Comedian is Someone Who Tells Jokes"	3:30
6.	"Gee, It's Good to Be Back Home"	2:59
7.	"Meet Me Here at Dawn"	3:39
8.	"When the Bible Was Wrote"	4:06
9.	"My Pilgrim Dear"	4:50
10.	"Bedding Down Post Xmas Time"	3:54
11.	"My Master"	4:20
Total length:		46:45

== Personnel ==
- Cass McCombs (Composer, Primary Artist)
- Chris Cohen (Guitar)
- Anthony Lukens (Organ)
- Matt Popieluch (Electric Piano)
- Jason Quever (Drums, Engineering)
- Luke Top (Bass)
- Brian DeRan (Cover Art)
- Dutch Germ (Artwork)
- Trevor Shimizu (Artwork)
- JJ Golding (Mastering)
