= Tip of the Sphere =

Studio album by Cass McCombs
- Released: February 8, 2019
- Studios: Figure 8, Brooklyn, New York, USA
- Genres: Folk rock, Americana
- Length: 57:30
- Label: Anti-

Cass McCombs chronology
Mangy Love (2016)	Tip of the Sphere (2019)	Heartmind (2022)

Singles from Tip of the Sphere
- 1. "Sleeping Volcanoes" Released: October 30, 2018

Professional ratings
Aggregate scores
Source	Rating
Metacritic	79/100
Review scores
Source	Rating
AllMusic	3.5/5 stars
American Songwriter	3.5/5 stars
Clash	6/10
DIY	4/5 stars
NME	3/5 stars
Paste	7.5/10
Pitchfork	8.0/10

Tip of the Sphere is the ninth studio album by American singer-songwriter Cass McCombs. It was released on February 8, 2019, through Anti- Records.

"Sleeping Volcanoes" was released as the first single from the album on October 30, 2018.

== Track listing ==
All tracks are written by Cass McCombs.

No.	Title	Length
1.	"I Followed the River South to What"	7:36
2.	"The Great Pixley Train Robbery"	4:00
3.	"Estrella"	4:36
4.	"Absentee"	2:48
5.	"Real Life"	5:15
6.	"Sleeping Volcanoes"	4:27
7.	"Sidewalk Bop After Suicide"	4:27
8.	"Prayer for Another Day"	4:53
9.	"American Canyon Sutra"	4:45
10.	"Tying Up Loose Ends"	4:34
11.	"Rounder"	10:09

Deluxe vinyl edition bonus tracks
No.	Title	Length
12.	"Confidence Man"	4:42
13.	"Root Hog or Die"	5:04
14.	"The Open Door"	4:07

== Charts ==
Chart (2019)	Peak position
UK Americana Albums (Official Charts)	3
US Heatseekers Albums (Billboard)	7
US Independent Albums (Billboard)	19
