= PREfection =

Studio album by Cass McCombs
- Released: January 11, 2005
- Length: 47:23
- Label: 4AD

Cass McCombs chronology
| A (2003) | PREfection (2005) | Dropping the Writ (2007) |

Professional ratings
Review scores
| Source | Rating |
|---|---|
| Pitchfork | (7.4/10) |
| Music Emissions | 4/5 stars |

PREfection is the second studio album by Cass McCombs, released in 2005. It is a follow-up to his 2003 debut album A.

== Track listing ==
1. "Equinox" – 3:35
2. "Subtraction" – 3:49
3. "Multiple Suns" – 5:22
4. "Tourist Woman" – 3:47
5. "Sacred Heart" – 4:06
6. "She's Still Suffering" – 5:20
7. "Cuckoo" – 4:05
8. "Bury Mary" – 2:18
9. "City of Brotherly Love" – 4:29
10. "All Your Dreams May Come True" – 10:32

== Personnel ==
- Cass McCombs (Composer, Primary Artist)
- Natalie Conn (Keyboards, Vocals)
- Dutch Germ (Drums, Vocals)
- Trevor Shimizu (Bass, Sampling, Vocals, Photography)
- Bill Skibbe (Engineer)
- Jessica Ruffins (Engineer)
- Steve Rooke (Mastering)
- Chris Coady (Mixing)
- Asha Schecter (Layout Design)
