= Mangy Love =

Studio album by Cass McCombs
- Released: August 26, 2016
- Genres: Indie rock, soft rock
- Length: 59:11
- Label: Anti-
- Producers: Rob Schnapf, Dan Horne

Cass McCombs chronology
A Folk Set Apart (2015)	Mangy Love (2016)	Tip of the Sphere (2019)

Professional ratings
Review scores
Source	Rating
Drowned in Sound	8/10
Flood Magazine	7/10
The Guardian	3/5 stars
Paste	7.9/10
Pitchfork	8.1/10

Mangy Love is the eighth full-length album by American musician Cass McCombs, released on August 26, 2016.

== Rankings ==
Publication	List	Rank	Ref.
American Songwriter	Top 50 Albums of 2016	33	
Mojo	The 50 Best Albums of 2016	26	
Stereogum	The 50 Best Albums of 2016	31	

== Track listing ==
All tracks are written by Cass McCombs.

No.	Title	Length
1.	"Bum Bum Bum"	4:59
2.	"Rancid Girl"	4:22
3.	"Laughter Is the Best Medicine"	5:18
4.	"Opposite House"	4:14
5.	"Medusa's Outhouse"	4:55
6.	"Low Flyin' Bird"	6:01
7.	"Cry"	4:45
8.	"Run Sister Run"	5:51
9.	"In a Chinese Alley"	3:15
10.	"It"	5:11
11.	"Switch"	4:14
12.	"I'm a Shoe"	6:06

== Personnel ==
- Cass McCombs – banjo, guitar, harmonium, piano, primary artist, producer, vocals
- Stuart Bogie – flute, horn, jaw harp
- Goat Carson – vocals
- Rachael Cassells – photography
- Mark Chalecki – mastering
- Mike Gordon – guitar, vocals
- Kurt Heasley – vocals
- Trevor Hernandez – layout
- Albert Herter – illustrations
- Dan Horne – bass, guitar, mixing, producer, programming
- Jesse Lee – drums
- Blake Mills – guitar
- Jack Name – synthesizer
- Angel Olsen – vocals
- Sam Owens – mixing, producer
- Lee Pardini – keyboards, organ, piano, electric piano
- Ariel Rechtshaid – programming
- Brian Rosemeyer – engineer
- Joe Russo – drums, percussion
- Ryan Sawyer – congas
- Farmer Dave Scher – keyboards
- Rob Schnapf – mixing, producer
- Jon Shaw – bass
- Bongo Sidibe – percussion
- Aaron Sperske – drums
- Maxwell Wang – vocals
- Wilder Zoby – keyboards, synthesizer

== Charts ==
Chart (2016–17)	Peak position
Belgian Albums (Ultratop Flanders)	137
Spanish Albums (PROMUSICAE)	58
US Independent Albums (Billboard)	39
US Heatseekers Albums (Billboard)	15
