= Joy (7669 song) =

Single by 7669

from the album 7669
- Released: 1994
- Genre: R&B

7669 singles chronology
"So High" (1993)	"Joy" (1994)

Music video
- "Joy" Video on YouTube

Joy is a dance/R&B single by 7669. It was the second single released from her debut album 7669. The single charted on the Billboard R&B/Hip Hop Singles chart on May 14, 1994.

== Chart positions ==
Chart (1997)	Peak position
U.S. Billboard Hot R&B/Hip-Hop Songs	72
