= Dropping the Writ =

Studio album by Cass McCombs
- Released: October 9, 2007
- Genre: Folk
- Length: 42:50
- Label: Domino

Cass McCombs chronology
PREfection (2005)	Dropping the Writ (2007)	Catacombs (2009)

Professional ratings
Review scores
Source	Rating
AllMusic	3.5/5 stars
PrefixMag	8/10 stars
Pitchfork	(6.6/10)

Dropping the Writ is the third studio album released by musician Cass McCombs. The album was released on October 9, 2007 by Domino Records.

== Track listing ==
All tracks by Cass McCombs

1. "Lionkiller" – 4:31
2. "Pregnant Pause" – 3:29
3. "That's That" – 4:15
4. "Petrified Forest" – 3:59
5. "Morning Shadows" – 2:56
6. "Deseret" – 3:54
7. "Crick in My Neck" – 4:19
8. "Full Moon or Infinity" – 4:25
9. "Windfall" – 4:48
10. "Wheel of Fortune" – 6:14

== Personnel ==
- Rob Barbato – theremin
- Aaron Shugart Brown – design, photography
- Ben Chappell – layout design
- Jerry Di Rienzo – engineer
- Travis Graves – vocals
- Albert Herter – paintings
- George Horn – mastering
- Claire Lin – layout design
- Cass McCombs – bass, guitar, piano, sound effects, vocals, engineer, design, photography
- Orpheo McCord – percussion, drums
- Matt Popieluch – acoustic Guitar, piano, vocals
- Garrett Ray – drums
- Andrew Scheps – mixing
- Trevor Shimizu – guitar
- Luke Top – bass, vocals, engineer
