= That's My Work 2 =

Mixtape by Snoop Dogg
- Released: October 29, 2013
- Recorded: 2013
- Genre: Hip hop
- Label: Doggystyle

Snoop Dogg chronology
Reincarnated (2013)	That's My Work 2 (2013)	Royal Fam (2013)

That's My Work 2 is a mixtape by American rapper Snoop Dogg, hosted by DJ Drama. It was released free for digital download via DatPiff on October 29, 2013.

== Track listing ==
No.	Title	Artist	Length
1.	"Intro - Tha Dogg in Me"	Snoop Dogg	3:08
2.	"Bad 4 Me"	Snoop Dogg	3:43
3.	"No Ordinary Affair"	Iza	3:18
4.	"Let the K Spray"	Snoop Dogg	3:46
5.	"Take Your Time"	Daylyric	3:39
6.	"Faddin"	Snoop Dogg	5:40
7.	"Catch Me in Traffic"	Mac Lucci	4:04
8.	"All My Hoes"	Snoop Dogg featuring Suga Free	3:39
9.	"RMM"	Snoop Dogg	2:06
10.	"Ball Till We Ball"	Tha Broadus Boyz	4:40
11.	"Passenger Seat"	Snoop Dogg	5:16
12.	"Because I'm Black"	Snoop Dogg	3:25
13.	"La La La Remix"	Snoop Dogg	2:33
14.	"Let Me Explain"	Snoop Dogg featuring Erick Sermon and Method Man	3:29
15.	"Panties Off"	Snoop Dogg featuring Tha Dogg Pound	3:20
16.	"What's the Difference"	Iza	3:11
17.	"Groove Thang"	Snoop Dogg	3:35
18.	"No Regrets"	Snoop Dogg featuring T.I.	3:24
19.	"Bonus - Outro" (Bonus: "I'm Gone")	Deacon of tha Chuuch featuring T. Gotti and Hard Head	4:41
