= Here Comes the King (song) =

Single by Snoop Lion featuring Angela Hunte

from the album Reincarnated
- Released: December 3, 2012
- Recorded: 2012
- Genre: Reggae fusion
- Length: 3:24
- Label: Berhane Sound System; Vice; Mad Decent; RCA
- Songwriters: Calvin Broadus; Raoul Gonzalez; Angela Hunte; Thomas Wesley Pentz; Rechtshaid
- Producers: Major Lazer; Ariel Rechtshaid; 6Blocc - aka R.A.W

Snoop Lion singles chronology
"La La La" (2012)	"Here Comes the King" (2012)	"Lighters Up" (2012)

"Here Comes the King" is a song by American rapper Snoop Lion featuring Angela Hunte. Was released on December 3, 2012 as the first single of his twelfth studio album Reincarnated, with the record labels Berhane Sound System, Vice Records, Mad Decent and RCA.

== Music video ==
The official video was released on February 12, 2013 in the singer account at VEVO platform. The music video was directed by Hatem Abusitta.

== Track listing ==
- Download digital
1. Here Comes the King (featuring Angela Hunte) — 3:24

== Chart performance ==
Chart (2013)	Peak position
France (SNEP)	73
