= Big Wheel and Others =

Studio album by Cass McCombs
- Released: October 15, 2013
- Genre: Indie rock
- Length: 85:23
- Label: Domino
- Producer: Cass McCombs

Cass McCombs chronology
Humor Risk (2011)	Big Wheel and Others (2013)	A Folk Set Apart (2015)

Professional ratings
Review scores
Source	Rating
AllMusic	3/5 stars
Pitchfork	7.9/10
Drowned in Sound	8/10
Paste	9.2/10

Big Wheel and Others is the seventh full-length album by American musician Cass McCombs. It was released on October 15, 2013.

== Track listing ==
All tracks are written by Cass McCombs, except where noted.

Disc one
No.	Title	Length
1.	"Sean I"	0:58
2.	"Big Wheel"	3:40
3.	"Angel Blood"	3:43
4.	"Morning Star"	3:57
5.	"The Burning of the Temple, 2012"	6:03
6.	"Brighter!"	3:57
7.	"There Can Be Only One"	4:17
8.	"Name Written in Water"	2:53
9.	"Joe Murder"	5:52
10.	"Everything Has to Be Just-So"	9:00

Disc two
No.	Title	Length
1.	"It Means a Lot to Know You Care"	3:33
2.	"Dealing"	3:19
3.	"Sooner Cheat Death Than Fool Love"	3:12
4.	"Satan Is My Toy"	2:39
5.	"Sean II"	1:12
6.	"Home on the Range"	6:38
7.	"Brighter!"	3:51
8.	"Untitled Spain Song"	3:58
9.	"Sean III"	0:52
10.	"Honesty Is No Excuse" (Phil Lynott)	5:24
11.	"Aeon of Aquarius Blues"	3:37
12.	"Unearthed"	2:54

== Personnel ==
Adapted from AllMusic.

- Cass McCombs – guitars, vocals
- Karen Black – featured artist
- Tim Cedar – engineer
- Arthur Elletson – engineer
- Sean Paulson – engineer
- Ariel Rechtshaid – engineer
- Nicolas Vernhes – engineer
- Gabe Wax – engineer
- Chet "JR" White – mixing
- Malcolm Pullinger – editing
- Mike Gordon – bass ("There Can Be Only One")
- Chris Lux – titles
- Perry Lubin – layout
- Joe Lambert – mastering
- Albert Herter – cover art, drawing
