= No Guns Allowed =

Single by Snoop Lion featuring Drake & Cori B

from the album Reincarnated
- Released: March 20, 2013
- Genre: Reggae fusion; R&B
- Length: 3:31
- Label: Berhane Sound System; Vice; Mad Decent; RCA
- Songwriters: Calvin Broadus; Bain; Zach Condon; Aubrey Graham; Henry; Hershey; Hunte; Rechtshaid; Thomas Wesley Pentz
- Producers: Major Lazer; Ariel Rechtshaid; Dre Skull; Zach Condon

Snoop Lion singles chronology
"Lighters Up" (2013)	"No Guns Allowed" (2013)	"Ashtrays and Heartbreaks" (2013)

Drake singles chronology
"No New Friends" (2013)	"No Guns Allowed" (2013)	"Hold On, We're Going Home" (2013)

Cori B singles chronology
"Daddy’s Girl" (2012)	"No Guns Allowed" (2013)	"Sittin’ In My Room" (2016)

"No Guns Allowed" is a song by American rapper Snoop Lion featuring Canadian rapper Drake and singer Cori B. Was released on March 20, 2013 as the third single of his twelfth studio album Reincarnated, with the record labels Berhane Sound System, Vice Records, Mad Decent and RCA.

The track samples parts of a song by Beirut called Nantes, especially the opening of the song.

== Lyrics ==
According to Snoop, the songs message is to promote peace. Drake's verse mentions a shooting on Danzig Street in Toronto in summer 2012.

== Music video ==
The official video was released on April 2, 2013.

== Track listing ==
- Download digital
1. No Guns Allowed (featuring Cori B and Drake) — 3:46

== Charts ==
Chart (2013)	Peak position
Belgium (Ultratop 50 Flanders)	61
Belgium Urban (Ultratop Flanders)	38
US Bubbling Under R&B/Hip-Hop Singles (Billboard)	8
US R&B Streaming Songs (Billboard)	22
US Reggae Digital Songs (Billboard)	2
