= A Folk Set Apart =

Compilation album by Cass McCombs
- Released: December 18, 2015
- Genre: Indie rock
- Length: 1:14:22
- Label: Domino

Cass McCombs chronology
Big Wheel and Others (2013)	A Folk Set Apart (2015)	Mangy Love (2016)

Professional ratings
Aggregate scores
Source	Rating
Metacritic	73/100
Review scores
Source	Rating
AllMusic	3.5/5 stars
Pitchfork	7.0/10
Drowned in Sound	8/10
PopMatters	7/10
Under the Radar	7/10
Glide Magazine	7/10
The Guardian	3/5 stars

A Folk Set Apart is a compilation album by American musician Cass McCombs. It was released in December 2015 through Domino Records.

== Track listing ==
No.	Title	Length
1.	"I Cannot Lie"	3:00
2.	"A.Y.D."	4:06
3.	"Oatmeal"	2:33
4.	"Twins"	5:32
5.	"Minimum Wage"	3:05
6.	"Poet's Day"	2:45
7.	"An Other"	3:55
8.	"Bradley Manning"	3:54
9.	"Evangeline"	3:31
10.	"Empty Promises"	4:25
11.	"If You Loved Me Before…"	3:55
12.	"Three Men Sitting on a Hollow Log"	4:41
13.	"Lost River/Old River"	2:14
14.	"Old as Angry"	4:40
15.	"Texas"	6:22
16.	"Night of the World"	2:23
17.	"Traffic of Souls"	5:02
18.	"Catacombs Cow Cow Boogie [Instrumental]"	3:53
19.	"The State Will Take Care of Me"	4:26
