= Cass McCombs =

American musician (born 1977)

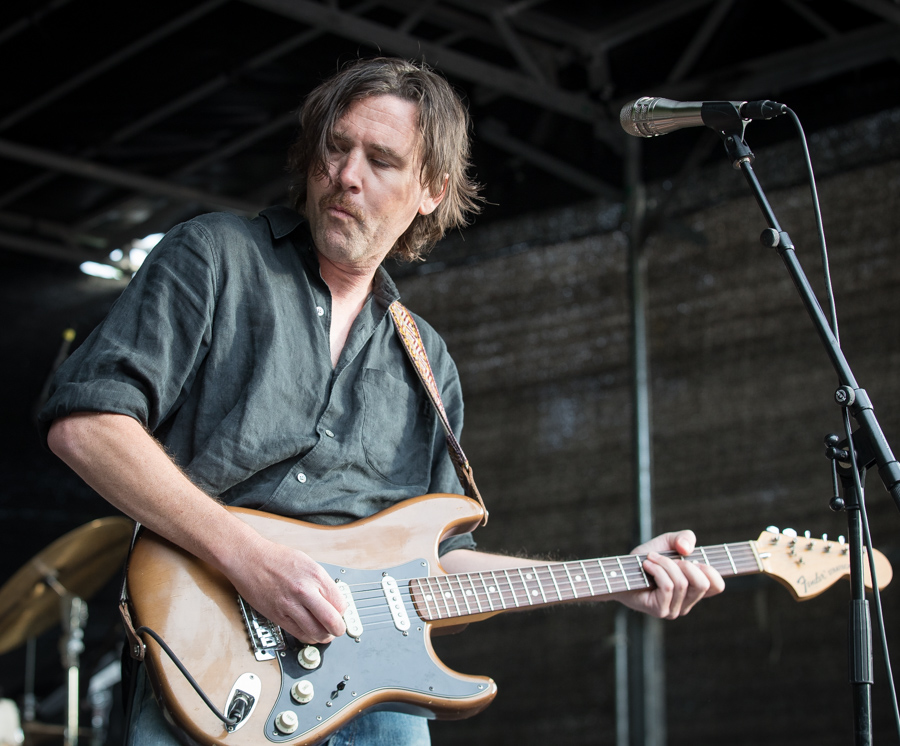
- McCombs performing in 2017

Background information
- Born: November 13, 1977 (age 48); Concord, California, U.S.
- Genres: Indie rock; indie folk; folk rock; psychedelic folk
- Occupation: Singer-songwriter
- Instruments: Vocals; guitar; keyboards
- Years active: 1990s–present
- Labels: Monitor; 4AD; Domino; Anti-
- Member of: The Skiffle Players
- Website: cassmccombs.com

Cass McCombs (born November 13, 1977) is an American singer-songwriter.

== Career ==
McCombs has played in numerous bands in the Bay Area during the 1990s before relocating to New York City. He released his debut EP Not the Way E.P. (2002), debut album A (2003), and follow-up PREfection (2005) via Monitor Records and 4AD. In 2007, McCombs signed to Domino Records and released Dropping the Writ (2007). Domino Records released his following four records including Catacombs (2009), which was voted one of the "50 Top Albums on the Year" by Pitchfork. It was followed by Wit's End (2011), Humor Risk (2011), and Big Wheel and Others (2013). He toured with John Cale in 2012.

His single "Bradley Manning" premiered on the Democracy Now News Hour in 2012. His songs have been featured in films including the surf film The Present (2009), and Ralph Arlyck documentary Following Sean, as well as notable skate videos featuring Jason Dill, Jerry Hsu, Chima Ferguson and Dylan Rieder.

In 2014, he did a co-headlining tour with the Meat Puppets. In June 2016, McCombs performed at the Primavera Sound and Field Day music festivals.

McCombs ANTI- Records debut, Mangy Love was released on August 26, 2016, which NME referred to as "McCombs' richest ever recording." On February 8, 2019 he released Tip of the Sphere on ANTI- Records. In 2020, Spurl Editions published McCombs' debut poetry collection Toy Fabels. His tenth studio album, Heartmind, was released on ANTI- Records on August 19, 2022.

In 2023, McCombs and Mr Greg, a San Francisco school teacher, released the album Mr Greg & Cass McCombs Sing and Play New Folk Songs for Children on Smithsonian Folkways.

== Discography ==
=== Studio albums ===
- A (2003)
- PREfection (2005)
- Dropping the Writ (2007)
- Catacombs (2009)
- Wit's End (2011)
- Humor Risk (2011)
- Big Wheel and Others (2013)
- Mangy Love (2016)
- Tip of the Sphere (2019)
- Heartmind (2022)
- Mr. Greg & Cass McCombs Sing and Play New Folk Songs for Children (With Mr Greg) (2023)
- Seed Cake on Leap Year (2024)
- Interior Live Oak (2025)

=== EPs ===
- Not the Way E.P. (2002)

=== Compilations ===
- A Folk Set Apart (2015)
