= Humor Risk (album) =

Studio album by Cass McCombs
- Released: November 8, 2011
- Genre: Indie folk, indie rock
- Length: 41:11
- Label: Domino
- Producer: Cass McCombs, Ariel Rechtshaid, John Webster Johns

Cass McCombs chronology
Wit's End (2011)	Humor Risk (2011)	Big Wheel and Others (2013)

Professional ratings
Aggregate scores
Source	Rating
Metacritic	78/100
Review scores
Source	Rating
Spin	—
Pitchfork	7.6/10
NME	3/5 stars
Drowned in Sound	8/10
The Quietus	—

Humor Risk is the sixth full-length album by Cass McCombs. It was released on November 8, 2011, just seven months after the release of McCombs' previous album, Wit's End. In an interview with the Pitchfork website, McCombs said the two albums were made simultaneously. He explained: "Wit's End was started years ago and it slowly made its way to the finish line. Humor Risk was just punched out. They're friends but they're different. Wit's End is like a stew; Humor Risk is the raw food diet."

"Robin Egg Blue" was the first single released, on November 28, 2011.

== Track listing ==
All songs written by Cass McCombs

1. "Love Thine Enemy" – 3:56
2. "The Living Word" – 5:44
3. "The Same Thing" – 6:13
4. "To Every Man His Chimera" – 5:21
5. "Robin Egg Blue" – 3:42
6. "Mystery Mail" – 7:50
7. "Meet Me at the Mannequin Gallery" – 4:28
8. "Mariah" – 3:55

== Personnel ==
- Cass McCombs - vocals, electric guitar, acoustic guitar, piano, percussion
- Dan Altaire - drums
- Rob Barbato - bass, vocals
- Will Canzoneri - organ, piano, clavinet, Hammond B3
- Chris Cohen - electric guitar
- Ariel Rechtshaid - synth
- Parker Kindred - drums
- Brad Truax - bass
- Dave Schiffman - percussion
- John Webster Johns - synths, electric guitars
- Liza Thorn - vocals
