= Catacombs (album) =

Studio album by Cass McCombs
- Released: June 1, 2009
- Genre: Alternative country, folk
- Length: 51:50
- Label: Domino
- Producer: Ariel Rechtshaid, Cass McCombs

Cass McCombs chronology
Dropping the Writ (2007)	Catacombs (2009)	Wit's End (2011)

Professional ratings
Aggregate scores
Source	Rating
Metacritic	76/100
Review scores
Source	Rating
AllMusic	3.5/5 stars
Rockfeedback	3/5 stars
Prefix Mag	9/10
Pitchfork	8.2/10
Gigwise.com	3.5/5 stars
NME	8/10

Catacombs is the fourth full-length album by Cass McCombs released on June 1, 2009 in the UK, and on July 7 in North America via Domino Records. The first single, "Dreams Come True Girl", was released on May 25, 2009. The single also features Academy Award-nominee Karen Black as backing vocals. The album was voted one of the 50 greatest albums of 2009 by Pitchfork Media. Music videos have been released for the songs "Dreams-Come-True-Girl", "You Saved My Life", and "The Executioner's Song".

== Track listing ==
1. "Dreams-Come-True-Girl" – 5:20
2. "Prima Donna" – 4:53
3. "You Saved My Life" – 5:24
4. "Don't Vote" – 5:26
5. "The Executioner's Song" – 4:21
6. "Harmonia" – 6:06
7. "My Sister, My Spouse" – 5:14
8. "Lionkiller Got Married" – 5:34
9. "Eavesdropping on the Competition" – 3:53
10. "Jonesy Boy" – 4:44
11. "One Way to Go" – 2:55

== Personnel ==
- Cass McCombs (Artwork, Audio Production, Composer, Guitars, Harmonica, Piano, Synthesizer, Vocals)
- Rob Barbato (Acoustic Guitar, Synthesizer, Tom-Tom, Vocals)
- Will Canzoneri (Organ)
- Greg Leisz (Pedal Steel Guitar)
- Orpheo McCord (Percussion, Vocals)
- Ariel Rechtschaid (Audio Engineer, Synthesizer)
- Daniel Rukasin (Trombone)
- Walker Teret (Bass, Piano, Vocals)
- Luke Top (Acoustic Guitar)

=== Other personnel ===
- Gelett Burgess (Composer)
- Aaron Shugart Brown (Artwork)
- Karen Black (Featured Artist)
- Asha Schechter (Photography)
- Christopher Wilson (Photography)
- Dave Shultz (Mastering)
