= Smoke the Weed =

Song by Snoop Lion featuring Collie Buddz

from the album Reincarnated
- Released: December 23, 2013
- Recorded: 2013
- Genre: Reggae fusion
- Length: 3:28
- Label: Berhane Sound System; Vice; Mad Decent; RCA
- Songwriters: Calvin Broadus; Collie Buddz Bain; M. Chin; Ted Chung; Henry; Nellee Hooper; Hunte; Simon Law; Larry Marshall; Paul Preston Palmer; Dwayne Chin Quee; Berrisford Romeo; Caron Wheeler
- Producers: Supa Dups; Major Lazer; Jus Bus

"Smoke the Weed" is a song by American recording artist Snoop Lion featuring recording artist Collie Buddz. It was released on December 23, 2013, by Berhane Sound System, Vice Records, Mad Decent, and RCA Records. "Smoke the Weed" is the eighth track from his twelfth studio album Reincarnated (2013).

== Charts performance ==
Chart (2013)	Peak position
Germany (GfK)	78
Switzerland (Schweizer Hitparade)	60
US Reggae Digital Songs (Billboard)	3
