= Better in the Morning =

Single by Little Boots

from the album Working Girl
- Released: 5 May 2015
- Recorded: 2015
- Genre: Dance-pop
- Length: 3:24
- Label: On Repeat Records
- Songwriters: Little Boots, Ariel Rechtshaid

Little Boots singles chronology
"Satellite" (2013)	"Better in the Morning" (2015)	"No Pressure" (2015)

"Better in the Morning" is a 2015 song by British singer and songwriter Little Boots. It was released as the lead single from her third studio album, "Working Girl."

Upon release, "Better in the Morning" was met with a high positive reception from critics, and is often regarded as one of Hesketh's best releases. On 4 June 2015, a music video was released to accompany the song, which also received praise from music critics.

== Background and composition ==
"Better in the Morning" has been described as "sleek pop" and "hip-hop inspired." It samples "Genius of Love" by The Tom Tom Club.

== Release ==
"Better in the Morning" was released as an audio download on 6 May 2015, to accompany Little Boots' announcement of her new album. A CD single of the song was also made available for pre-order.

== Critical reception ==
The song received highly positive reviews upon its release. Spin called the song "sunny" and "spectacularly hooky," and noted the song's catchiness. Billboard commented that "Little Boots may have finally found a producer that can magnify her dance-pop sensibilities," going on to praise her coyness but criticize her "deadpan" delivery. Stereogum's Gabriela Tully Claymore felt that the song "rides on the same kind of nostalgic computer-pop production technique that’s propelled PC Music to the forefront over the course of the past year, minus the irony."

== Music video ==
A music video was released on 4 June 2015 to promote the song. It features Little Boots in front of various pastel-colored backdrops, getting ready for work.
