= Wit's End =

Studio album by Cass McCombs
- Released: April 26, 2011
- Length: 47:19
- Label: Domino
- Producer: Ariel Rechtshaid, Cass McCombs

Cass McCombs chronology
Catacombs (2009)	Wit's End (2011)	Humor Risk (2011)

Professional ratings
Aggregate scores
Source	Rating
Metacritic	74/100
Review scores
Source	Rating
Tiny Mix Tapes	4/5 stars
Pitchfork	8.4/10

Wit's End is the fifth full-length album by Cass McCombs. It was released on Domino Records in April 2011, becoming the first of two albums released by McCombs that year. The first single from the album, "County Line", was accompanied by two different music videos.

== Track listing ==
All songs written and composed by Cass McCombs.

No.	Title	Length
1.	"County Line"	5:37
2.	"The Lonely Doll"	5:37
3.	"Buried Alive"	5:37
4.	"Saturday Song"	5:12
5.	"Memory's Stain"	7:23
6.	"Hermit's Cave"	4:19
7.	"Pleasant Shadow Song"	4:11
8.	"A Knock Upon the Door"	9:23
Total length:		47:19

== Personnel ==
=== Musicians ===
- Cass McCombs – vocals, acoustic guitar, synthesizer, piano, electric piano, percussion
- Will Canzoneri – Hammond B3, clavinet, celeste
- Chris Cohen – electric guitar, 12-string acoustic guitar
- Walker Teret – upright bass, vocals, banjo
- Orpheo McCord – drums, percussion
- Garrett Ray – drums, percussion
- Rob Barbato – bass, vocals
- Robbie Lee – bass clarinet, accordion, chalumeau, portatif organ
- Justin Meldal-Johnsen – bass
- Parker Kindred – drums, percussion
- Brad Truax – bass
- Peter Moren – miniature acoustic guitar

=== Production ===
- Cass McCombs – production, additional engineering
- Ariel Rechtshaid – production, engineering
- Dave Schiffman – engineering, mixing
- Chris Coady – additional engineering
- Eric Spring – additional engineering
- Bernie Grundman – mastering
- Albert Herter – drawings
- Malcolm Pullinger – cover design
- Philippe Remond – cover photograph
