= Torn Apart (Snoop Lion song) =

Song by Snoop Lion featuring Rita Ora

from the album Reincarnated
- Released: 2013
- Length: 3:30
- Label: Berhane Sound System, Vice Records, Mad Decent and RCA
- Songwriters: Calvin Broadus, John Hill, Angela Hunte, Thomas Pentz, Rechtshaid, David Taylor
- Producers: Major Lazer, John Hill, Ariel Rechtshaid

"Torn Apart" is a song by American rapper Snoop Lion featuring British singer Rita Ora. It was released in 2013 on his twelfth studio album, Reincarnated (2013).

== Music video ==
The official video was released on July 1, 2013, on the singer's YouTube VEVO platform.

== Charts ==
| Chart (2013) | Peak position |
|---|---|
| Belgium (Ultratop 50 Flanders) | 44 |
| Belgium Urban (Ultratop Flanders) | 41 |
