= Ashtrays and Heartbreaks =

Single by Snoop Lion featuring Miley Cyrus

from the album Reincarnated
- Released: April 4, 2013
- Studio: Geejam Studios (Portland, Jamaica)
- Genre: Reggae fusion
- Length: 4:06
- Label: Berhane Sound System; Vice; Mad Decent; RCA
- Songwriters: Calvin Broadus; Thomas Pentz; Ariel Rechtshaid; Andrew Hershey; Angela Hunte
- Producers: Major Lazer; Ariel Rechtshaid; Dre Skull

Snoop Lion singles chronology
"No Guns Allowed" (2013)	"Ashtrays and Heartbreaks" (2013)	"Faden Away" (2013)

Miley Cyrus singles chronology
"Decisions" (2012)	"Ashtrays and Heartbreaks" (2013)	"Fall Down" (2013)

Music video
- "Ashtrays and Heartbreaks" on YouTube

"Ashtrays and Heartbreaks" is a song by American recording artist Snoop Lion featuring American recording artist Miley Cyrus. It was released on April 4, 2013 by Berhane Sound System, Vice Records, Mad Decent, and RCA Records as the fourth single from his twelfth studio album Reincarnated (2013).

== Background ==
"Ashtrays and Heartbreaks" premiered on Major Lazer's SoundCloud account on April 3, 2013. The song is performed by Snoop Dogg (under the name Snoop Lion) as a lead artist and Miley Cyrus as a featured artist, and produced by Major Lazer, Ariel Rechtshaid, and Dre Skull. The following day, the track was released as a digital single on iTunes by Berhane Sound System. The feature was Miley Cyrus' first single since 2012. A lyric video was uploaded to Snoop's Vevo channel on YouTube. In the United States, the single officially impacted rhythmic contemporary radio on April 29, 2013 and then contemporary hit radio on May 28.

== Music video ==
The video was filmed in April, 2013 by director P. R. Brown and premiered on Snoop Lion's Vevo on May 30, 2013. It features a cameo of Diplo, a member of Major Lazer.

== Charts ==
Chart performance for "Ashtrays and Heartbreaks"
Chart (2013)	Peak position
Belgium (Ultratip Bubbling Under Flanders)	51
Belgium (Ultratip Bubbling Under Wallonia)	20
US Reggae Digital Songs (Billboard)	1

== Release history ==
"Ashtrays and Heartbreaks" release history
Region	Date	Format	Label(s)	Ref.
Various	April 4, 2013	Digital download	Berhane Sound System	
United States	April 29, 2013	Rhythmic contemporary radio	RCA	
United States	May 28, 2013	Contemporary hit radio	Berhane Sound System; RCA	
