= Reincarnated (album) =

Studio album by Snoop Lion
- Released: April 23, 2013
- Recorded: 2012–13
- Genres: Reggae; dancehall; reggae fusion
- Length: 44:17
- Labels: Berhane Sound System; RCA
- Producers: Diplo; Major Lazer (also exec.); 6Blocc; Ariel Rechtshaid; Dre Skull; John Hill; Terrace Martin; Jus Bus; Kyle Townsend; Supa Dups; Zach Condon; Zion I Kings

Snoop Lion chronology
That's My Work, Volume 1 (2012)	Reincarnated (2013)	That's My Work 2 (2013)

Singles from Reincarnated
- 1. "Here Comes the King" Released: December 3, 2012; 2. "Lighters Up" Released: December 18, 2012; 3. "No Guns Allowed" Released: April 2, 2013; 4. "Ashtrays and Heartbreaks" Released: April 4, 2013

Reincarnated is the twelfth studio album by American rapper Snoop Dogg, his sole release using the reggae persona Snoop Lion. Berhane Sound System and RCA Records released the album April 23, 2013.

The album features guest appearances from Busta Rhymes, Akon, Chris Brown, Mavado, Popcaan, Mr. Vegas, Collie Buddz, Miley Cyrus, Rita Ora, and Drake among others. The album's production was handled by Major Lazer, Ariel Rechtshaid, 6Blocc, Dre Skull, Supa Dups and Diplo, who also served as executive producer. It is a companion project to the documentary film Reincarnated.

Reincarnated was nominated for Best Reggae Album at the 56th Annual Grammy Awards.

== Background ==
Snoop Lion has traveled to Jamaica and studied in the Nyabinghi branch of the Rastafari movement. He has cited reggae musicians such as Bob Marley, Peter Tosh, Bunny Wailer, Gregory Isaacs and Jimmy Cliff as influences for the album. Snoop has said, in regards to his new musical direction, "I feel like I've always been Rastafari, I just didn't have my third eye open." Diplo, Major Lazer, Ariel Rechtshaid and Dre Skull are the album's main producers, with Diplo serving as executive producer as well. Other producers, including 6Blocc and Supa Dups, among others.

== Singles ==
The first promotional single was "La La La", a track produced by Major Lazer, was released on July 20, 2012. The music video, directed by filmmaker Eli Roth, was released on October 31, 2012. The first single, "Here Comes the King", which is also a Major Lazer produced track with Ariel Rechtshaid and 6Blocc, features singer-songwriter Angela Hunte, who is best known for writing Jay-Z and Alicia Keys successful 2009 hit "Empire State of Mind". It was released on December 3, 2012, with its music video, directed by Andy Capper, being released on February 7, 2013.

The second single, "Lighters Up", produced by Dre Skull and Major Lazer, featuring Jamaican musicians Mavado and Popcaan, with an uncredited Jahdan Blakkamoore on chorus. It was released to iTunes on December 18, 2012, and its music video directed by Andy Capper was released exclusively to VEVO on February 2, 2013. "Lighters Up" was official sent to Italian radio stations on February 8, 2013.

The album's third single was "No Guns Allowed" which features Snoop Lion's daughter Cori B and Canadian rapper Drake. It was premiered and performed live on Conan on March 12, 2013. The song was released for retail on April 2, 2013, along with the pre-order of the album. On April 2, 2013, the music video was released for "No Guns Allowed" featuring Cori B and Drake. "No Guns Allowed" was official serviced to Italian radio stations on April 5, 2013.

On April 4, 2013, "Ashtrays and Heartbreaks" featuring Miley Cyrus – produced by Major Lazer, Ariel Rechtshaid and Dre Skull – was made available for purchase via digital download as the lead single from the album. It officially impacted U.S. Rhythmic contemporary radio on April 29, 2013 and then U.S Top 40/Mainstream radio on May 28, 2013. On May 30, 2013, the music video was released for "Ashtrays and Heartbreaks" featuring Miley Cyrus.

On July 1, 2013, the music video was released for "Torn Apart" featuring Rita Ora. On August 22, 2013, the music video was released for "The Good Good" featuring Iza. On November 22, 2013, the music video was released for "Tired of Running" featuring Akon. On December 23, 2013, the music video was released for "Smoke the Weed" featuring Collie Buddz. On January 3, 2014, the music video was released for "Get Away" featuring Angela Hunte.

== Critical reception ==
Professional ratings
Aggregate scores
Source	Rating
Metacritic	53/100
Review scores
Source	Rating
AllMusic	2.5/5 stars
Billboard	7.5/10
The Boston Globe	4/10
Consequence of Sound	2.5/5 stars
Exclaim!	4/10
The Guardian	2/5 stars
The Independent	4/5 stars
Pitchfork	5.0/10
Rolling Stone	3.5/5 stars
Spin	4/10

Reincarnated was met with mixed reviews from music critics. At Metacritic, which assigns a weighted mean rating out of 100 to reviews from mainstream critics, the album received an average score of 53, based on 22 reviews. David Jeffries of Allmusic gave the album two and a half stars out of five, saying "A little backstory goes a long way when it comes to this one, so fans who have seen the Reincarnated documentary and relate to the rapper's rebirth can go up one letter grade. Otherwise, Reincarnated the album is all heart and heart-in-the-right-place, threatening to mash up the system without ever even harshing the mellow." Simon Vozick-Levinson of Rolling Stone gave the album three and a half stars out of five, saying "Reincarnated is Snoop's most consistently enjoyable record in years. A righteous new name wasn't all he brought home from his Jamaican pilgrimage. He also forged a creative partnership with executive producer Diplo, who serves up a tasty swirl of sticky-sweet bass lines and electro crunch. Snoop does the job with surprising grace, stretching his laid-back flow into a blissful croon. There's a winning sincerity to his sunny jams extolling peace, love and gun control; even the weed anthems feel less phoned-in than usual. It's hard not to give it up for such a big, goofy bear hug to the universe." Andy Gill of The Independent gave the album four out of five stars, saying "This debut offering as Snoop Lion has much to recommend it, not least the infectious grooves devised by Diplo's Major Lazer production team, an engaging blend of languid roots modes and propulsive electro methods."

Alexis Petridis of The Guardian gave the album two out of five stars, saying "As a pop-reggae album it's patchily OK; as an addition to the canon of righteous Rastafarian spiritual music, it's profoundly unconvincing and a bit insulting. If you were Bunny Wailer, you too might get a bit cross about the reductive, cartoonish depiction of your religious beliefs. Then again, Snoop might argue, that's par for the course: he's been in the business of perpetuating cartoonish stereotypes from the start. People love them, and him, maybe more than they love his music, which has been patchy for decades. Taking that into account, they might love this. And if they don't, he can always go back to the Nine Inch Dicks." Kevin Jones of Exclaim! gave the album a four out of ten, saying "While the humanity and personal growth shown in Snoop Lion's Reincarnated documentary granted the legendary rapper some sympathetic cover for his dubious rebirth as a reggae-singing Rasta, the eponymous album at the heart of that story affords him no such luxury. The Diplo-directed record is a somewhat sloppy mish-mash of reggae cuts that rarely attain an authentic air, a couple of Rita Ora- and Miley Cyrus-assisted pop write-offs, and one bit of Major Lazer-lite, in the oddly-placed "Get Away." Brent Faulkner of PopMatters gave the album a six out of ten, saying "Uneven though sometimes enjoyable, Reincarnated is surprisingly better than expected. That said, the effort still stumbles into the pitfalls of a musician altering his direction and leaving his comfort zone. Snoop Lion pulls off this album off stronger than Lil Wayne did rock (Rebirth), but still, Snoop is best suited spitting over luxurious west-coast beats."

Craig Jenkins of Pitchfork Media gave the album a 5.0 out of ten, saying "Too much of it is an ill-advised cultural safari that's too weird to fly but too monied to fail. But where it succeeds, Reincarnated forces you to forget the principal ridiculousness of the enterprise, and that is no small feat." Keith Harris of Spin gave the album a four out of ten, saying "Reincarnated's highlight is "Ashtrays and Heartbreaks," with, yes, Miley Cyrus, still in her first flush of post-teen stonerdom, sounding every bit like the sort of suburban teen was led not-quite-astray by Snoop's previous incarnation. Yet, it may just make you feel sad for the minors of the future to whose delinquency Snoop will have nothing to contribute." Patricia Meschino of Billboard gave the album a 7.5 out of ten, saying "Reincarnated stands as an enjoyable pop record laced with an assortment of roots and dancehall reggae references. Its sprinkling of Rasta ideology has, laudably, redirected Snoop's gangsta lyrical exploits towards enriching themes such as ending gang wars and curbing gun violence." Omar Burgess of HipHopDX gave the album three out of five stars, saying "The road to discounted and discarded albums is paved with good intentions. Listeners fortunate enough to get the complete Reincarnated experience saw both Snoop’s moving documentary and got a brief taste of the music as well. Sadly, the album in and of itself doesn’t offer that similar window into Snoop’s evolution. Snoop Lion has transcended Hip Hop and possibly music in general. He’s courting some listeners who had either yet to be born or were too young to remember exactly what he’s being reincarnated from."

== Commercial performance ==
The album debuted at number 16 on the Billboard 200 chart, with first-week sales of 21,000 copies in the United States. In its second week, the album sold 8,600 more copies. In its third week, the album sold 4,700 more copies. In its fourth week, the album sold 2,900 more copies. The album topped Billboard Top Reggae Albums for 34 non-consecutive weeks. Reincarnated was the best-selling reggae album in the United States in 2013. As of May 2015, the album has sold 104,000 copies in the United States.

== Track listing ==
No.	Title	Writer(s)	Producer(s)	Length
1.	"Rebel Way"	Calvin Broadus; Andrew Bain; Wayne Henry; Andrew Hershey; Thomas Pentz; Ariel Rechtshaid	Dre Skull; Major Lazer	4:44
2.	"Here Comes the King" (featuring Angela Hunte)	Broadus; Raoul Gonzalez; Angela Hunte; Pentz; Rechtshaid	Major Lazer; Ariel Rechtshaid; 6Blocc	3:25
3.	"Lighters Up" (featuring Mavado and Popcaan)	Broadus; Bain; David Brooks; Henry; Hershey; Pentz; Rechtshaid; Andrae Sutherland	Dre Skull; Major Lazer	3:48
4.	"So Long" (featuring Angela Hunte)	Broadus; Laurent Alfred; Bain; David Goldfine; Henry; Hunte; Pentz; Rechtshaid	Major Lazer; Zion I Kings	3:40
5.	"Get Away" (featuring Angela Hunte)	Broadus; Elan Atias; Hunte; Pentz; Rechtshaid	Major Lazer; Ariel Rechtshaid	3:27
6.	"No Guns Allowed" (featuring Drake and Cori B)	Broadus; Bain; Zach Condon; Aubrey Graham; Henry; Hershey; Hunte; Pentz; Rechtshaid	Major Lazer; Ariel Rechtshaid; Dre Skull; Zach Condon	3:31
7.	"Fruit Juice" (featuring Mr. Vegas)	Broadus; Bain; Noel Davey; Henry; Lloyd James; Pentz; Rechtshaid; Clifford Smith; Ian Smith	Major Lazer; Ariel Rechtshaid	2:37
8.	"Smoke the Weed" (featuring Collie Buddz)	Broadus; Bain; Mitchum Chin; Ted Chung; Colin Harper; Henry; Nellie Hooper; Hunte; Simon Law; Larry Marshall; Paul Preston Palmer; Dwayne Chin Quee; Berrisford Romeo; Caron Wheeler	Supa Dups; Major Lazer; Jus Bus	3:28
9.	"Tired of Running" (featuring Akon)	Broadus; Leslie Brathwaite; Aliaune Thiam; Giorgio Tuinfort	Akon; Leslie Brathwaite	4:10
10.	"The Good Good" (featuring Iza)	Diane Warren	Terrace Martin; Kyle Townsend	3:54
11.	"Torn Apart" (featuring Rita Ora)	Broadus; John Hill; Hunte; Pentz; Rechtshaid; David Taylor	Major Lazer; John Hill; Ariel Rechtshaid	3:30
12.	"Ashtrays and Heartbreaks" (featuring Miley Cyrus)	Broadus; Hershey; Hunte; Pentz; Rechtshaid	Major Lazer; Ariel Rechtshaid; Dre Skull	4:06
Total length:				44:17

Deluxe edition bonus tracks
No.	Title	Writer(s)	Producer(s)	Length
13.	"Boulevard" (featuring Jahdan Blakkamoore)	Broadus; Pentz; Rechtshaid; Hershey; Henry; Bain; Donat Roy Jackie Mittoo	Major Lazer; Ariel Rechtshaid; Dre Skull	3:12
14.	"Remedy" (featuring Busta Rhymes and Chris Brown)	Broadus; Hunte; Rechtshaid; Pentz; Trevor Smith; Andrew Williams; Abdul Wahab Lafta; Johnson Etienne	Major Lazer; Ariel Rechtshaid	3:00
15.	"La La La"	Broadus; Pentz; Rechtshaid; Joelle Clarke; Ken Boothe; William Cole	Major Lazer; Ariel Rechtshaid	3:27
16.	"Harder Times" (featuring Jahdan Blakkamoore)	Broadus; Pentz; Rechtshaid; Ken Boothe; William Cole; Hershey; Henry; Bain	Dre Skull; Major Lazer	3:32

== Personnel ==
Credits for Reincarnated adapted from Allmusic.

=== Musicians ===
- Elan Atias - vocals
- Cori B. - vocals
- Jahdan Blakkamoore - vocals, background vocals
- Mike Bolger - hammond b3, piano, trombone
- Shante Broadus - background vocals
- Collie Buddz - vocals
- Stewart Copeland - percussion
- Miley Cyrus - vocals
- Willy Dintenfass - guitar
- Drake - vocals
- Andrew Gouche - bass
- Angela Hunte - vocals
- IZA - vocals
- Trevor Lawrence Jr. - percussion
- Danny Levin - trumpet
- Mavado - vocals
- Mr. Vegas - vocals
- David Moyer - baritone, tenor, section leader
- Rita Ora - vocals
- Javonte Pollard - background vocals
- Popcann - vocals
- Dan Ubick - guitar, bass, rhythm
- Wendi Vaughn - background vocals
- Wyann Vaughn - background vocals
- Diane Warren - guitar
- Marlon Williams - guitar

=== Production ===
- 6Blocc - producer
- Akon - vocals, producer
- Leslie Brathwaite - mixing, producer
- David Byrnes - music business affairs
- Zach Condon - producer
- Rich Costey - mixing
- Dre Skull - additional production, producer
- Chris Gehringer - mastering
- Serban Ghenea - mixing
- Tasha Hayward - hair stylist
- Bo Hill - assistant
- John Hill - producer
- Chris "Bronski" Jablonski - engineer
- Jus Bus - producer
- Derrick K. Lee - music business affairs
- Justin Li - A&R
- Mario Luccy - engineer
- Major Lazer - executive producer, producer
- Terrace Martin - arranger, producer, saxophone
- Mr. Morgan - A&R
- Neil Pogue - mixing
- Luca Pretolesi - mixing
- Dwayne "Supa Dups" Chin Quee - producer
- Ariel Rechtshaid - engineer, producer, vocal producer
- Nick Rowe - vocal editing
- Phil Seaford - assistant engineer
- Kevin Seaton - additional production
- Snoop Lion - executive producer, primary artist
- Justin "Create" Toledo - design, packaging
- Willie Toledo - photography
- Kyle Townsend - producer
- Irina Volodarsky - music business affairs
- James M. Wisner - engineer, mixing
- Zion I Kings - producer

== Charts ==
=== Weekly charts ===
Chart (2013–14)	Peak position
Australian Albums (ARIA)	23
Austrian Albums (Ö3 Austria)	12
Belgian Albums (Ultratop Flanders)	50
Belgian Albums (Ultratop Wallonia)	126
Canadian Albums (Billboard)	14
Dutch Albums (Album Top 100)	75
French Albums (SNEP)	56
German Albums (Offizielle Top 100)	20
Italian Albums (FIMI)	89
New Zealand Albums (RMNZ)	31
Scottish Albums (Official Charts)	58
Swiss Albums (Schweizer Hitparade)	13
Spanish Albums (Promusicae)	90
UK Albums (Official Charts Company)	34
UK R&B Albums (Official Charts Company)	4
US Billboard 200	16
US Independent Albums (Billboard)	3
US Reggae Albums (Billboard)	1

=== Year-end charts ===
Chart (2013)	Position
US Independent Albums (Billboard)	43
US Top Reggae Albums (Billboard)	1

Chart (2014)	Position
US Top Reggae Albums (Billboard)	3

== Certifications and sales ==
Region	Certification	Certified units/sales
United States	—	104,000
