= Lighters Up (Snoop Dogg song) =

Single by Snoop Lion featuring Mavado and Popcaan

from the album Reincarnated
- Released: December 18, 2012
- Recorded: 2012
- Genre: Reggae fusion
- Length: 3:46
- Label: Berhane Sound System; Vice; Mad Decent; RCA
- Songwriter(s): Calvin Broadus; Bain; David Brooks; Henry; Hershey; Pentz; Rechtshaid; Andrae Sutherland
- Producer(s): Major Lazer; Dre Skull

Snoop Lion singles chronology
"Here Comes the King" (2012)	"Lighters Up" (2012)	"No Guns Allowed" (2013)

"Lighters Up" is a song by American singer Snoop Lion featuring Mavado and Popcaan. Was released on December 18, 2012 as the second single of his twelfth studio album Reincarnated, with the record labels Berhane Sound System, Vice Records, Mad Decent and RCA.

== Music video ==
The official video was released on February 1, 2013 in the singer account at VEVO platform. The music video was directed by Andy Capper.

== Track listing ==
- Download digital
1. Lighters Up (featuring Mavado and Popcaan) — 3:46

== Chart performance ==
Chart (2013)	Peak position
Belgium (Ultratop 50 Flanders)	29
Belgium Urban (Ultratop Flanders)	31
UK Singles (OCC)	195
US Reggae Digital Songs (Billboard)	3
