= La La La (Snoop Lion song) =

Promotional single by Snoop Lion

from the album Reincarnated
- Released: July 20, 2012
- Recorded: 2012
- Genre: Reggae, dancehall, reggae fusion
- Length: 3:27
- Label: BERHANE SOUND SYSTEM
- Songwriters: Calvin Broadus, Ariel Rechtshaid, Ken Boothe, Thomas Pentz, Joelle Clarke, William Cole
- Producers: Major Lazer, Dre Skull

"La La La" is a song by American rapper Snoop Lion (mainly known as Snoop Dogg), taken from Snoop Lion's twelfth studio album Reincarnated (2013). The song was written by Snoop, Ariel Rechtshaid, Ken Boothe, Thomas Pentz, Joelle Clarke and William Cole, with production handled by Major Lazer and Dre Skull. "La La La" was released on July 20, 2012 as the promotional single from the album.

== Music video ==
The music video, directed by filmmaker Eli Roth, was released on October 31, 2012.

== Charts ==
Chart (2012)	Peak position
Belgium (Ultratop 50 Flanders)	21

== See also ==
- Kâtibim
