= 7669 (group) =

American R&B girl group

- Born: Brooklyn, New York, U.S.
- Genres: R&B, new jack swing
- Occupation: Vocal group
- Instrument: Vocals
- Years active: 1993–1995
- Label: Motown
- Past members: Angela Hunte; Marcy Roberts; El-Melek A. Moore; Mallore Irvine

7669 was an American R&B girl group, who were signed to Motown Records in the 1990s. The name 7669 was a fusion of US independence (1776) and the sexual revolution (1969). The group was composed of members Angela "Big Ange" Hunte, Marcy "Shorti 1 Forti" Roberts, El-Melek A. "El Boog-E" Moore and Mallore "Thicknezz" Irvine.

Their debut album, 7669 East from a Bad Block, was released on November 2, 1993, and scored two minor hits on the Billboard R&B chart: "So High", which peaked at 35, and "Joy", which peaked at 72. The latter also peaked at number 60 in the UK singles Chart in June 1994.

The band appeared on a 1993 episode of Soul Train. Group member Angela Hunte was later credited on Jay-Z's 2009 single "Empire State of Mind" and won a Grammy award for Best Rap Song.

== Discography ==
=== Albums ===
Album information
7669 East From a Bad Block

Released 1993

=== Singles ===
Year	Title	Album	US R&B
1993	"So High"	7669 East From a Bad Block	35
1994	"Joy"	7669 East From a Bad Block	72
1994	"Heree Ah Cumm"	7669 East From a Bad Block	-
