= Plain White T's discography =

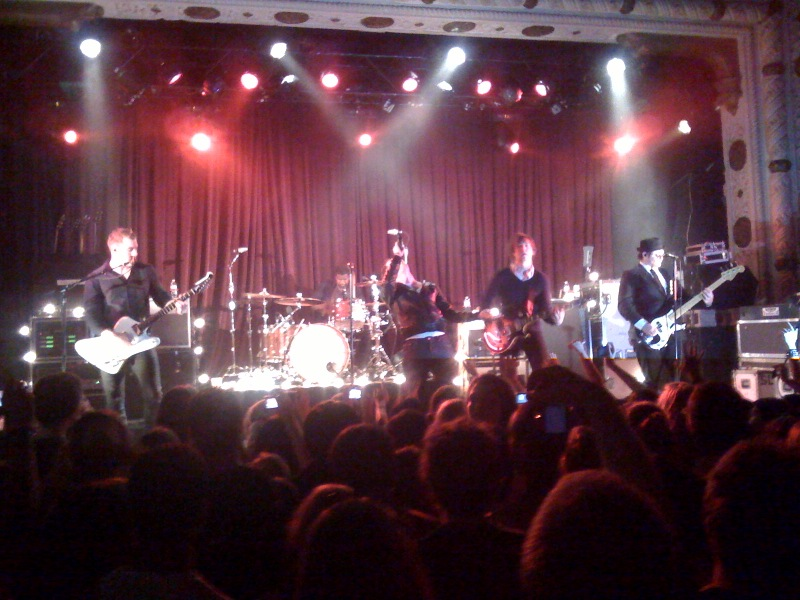
- Studio albums: 9
- Extended plays: 3
- Singles: 21
- Music videos: 18

The discography of American pop punk band Plain White T's consists of nine studio albums, three extended plays, twenty-one singles and eighteen music videos.

== Studio albums ==
List of studio albums, with selected chart positions and certifications
Title	Album details	Peak chart positions										Certifications
Title	Album details	US	AUS	AUT	BEL (FL)	FRA	GER	IRL	NLD	SWI	UK	Certifications
Come On Over	Released: June 9, 2000 (US); Formats: CD	—	—	—	—	—	—	—	—	—	—	
Stop	Released: August 20, 2002 (US); Label: Fearless; Formats: CD, digital download	—	—	—	—	—	—	—	—	—	—	
All That We Needed	Released: January 25, 2005 (US); Label: Fearless; Formats: CD, digital download	— (Note: All That We Needed did not enter the US Billboard 200, but peaked at number 26 on the US Heatseekers Albums Chart.)	—	—	—	—	—	—	—	—	—	RIAA: Gold
Every Second Counts	Released: September 12, 2006 (US); Label: Hollywood; Formats: CD, digital download	10	45	27	98	65	26	2	66	66	3	RIAA: Platinum; BPI: Gold; IRMA: Gold
Big Bad World	Released: September 23, 2008 (US); Label: Hollywood; Formats: CD, digital download	33	—	—	—	—	—	—	—	—	—	
Wonders of the Younger	Released: December 7, 2010 (US); Label: Hollywood; Formats: CD, digital download	149	—	—	—	—	—	—	—	—	— (Note: Wonders of the Younger did not enter the UK Albums Chart but peaked at number 81 on the UK Album Downloads Chart.)	
American Nights	Released: March 31, 2015 (US); Label: MRI; Formats: CD, digital download	—	—	—	—	—	—	—	—	—	—	
Parallel Universe	Released: August 24, 2018 (US); Label: Fearless Records; Formats: CD, digital download	—	—	—	—	—	—	—	—	—	—	
Plain White T's	Released: November 17, 2023 (US); Label: Fearless Records; Formats: CD, digital download	—	—	—	—	—	—	—	—	—	—	
"—" denotes a recording that did not chart or was not released in that territory.

== Extended plays ==
List of extended plays
Title	EP details
I'm Dreaming of a Plain White Christmas	Released: 1999 (US); Formats: CD
Rip Off the Hits	Released: 2001 (US); Formats: CD
Hey There Delilah EP	Released: May 9, 2006 (US); Label: Hollywood; Formats: CD, digital download
Should've Gone to Bed	Released: April 9, 2013 (US); Label: Hollywood; Formats: CD, digital download

== Singles ==
List of singles, with selected chart positions and certifications, showing year released and album name
Title	Year	Peak chart positions										Certifications	Album
Title	Year	US	AUS	AUT	BEL (FL)	CAN	GER	IRL	NLD	SWI	UK	Certifications	Album
"All That We Needed"	2004	—	—	—	—	—	—	—	—	—	—		All That We Needed
"Take Me Away"	2005	—	—	—	—	—	—	—	—	—	—		All That We Needed
"Hate (I Really Don't Like You)"	2006	68	—	—	—	—	—	—	—	—	53		Every Second Counts
"Hey There Delilah"	2006	1	3	3	2	1	1	2	8	9	2	RIAA: 7× Platinum; ARIA: Platinum; BPI: 3× Platinum; BVMI: Platinum; MC: 3× Platinum	Every Second Counts
"Our Time Now"	2007	90	37	—	—	—	87	—	—	— (Note: "Our Time Now" did not enter the Swiss Singles chart, but charted at number 77 on the Swiss Airplay chart.)	114	RIAA: Gold	Every Second Counts
"Natural Disaster"	2008	— (Note: "Natural Disaster" did not enter the Billboard Hot 100, but peaked at number 25 on the Bubbling Under Hot 100 Singles chart, which acts as an extension to the Hot 100.)	—	—	—	—	—	—	—	— (Note: "Natural Disaster" did not enter the Swiss Singles chart, but charted at number 91 on the Swiss Airplay chart.)	—		Big Bad World
"1, 2, 3, 4"	2008	34	—	22	—	—	27	—	—	— (Note: "1, 2, 3, 4" did not enter the Swiss Singles chart, but charted at number 47 on the Swiss Airplay chart.)	—	RIAA: 2× Platinum	Big Bad World
"Rhythm of Love"	2010	38	85	—	— (Note: "Rhythm of Love" did not enter the Ultratop 50, but peaked at number 30 on the Flemish Ultratip chart.)	98	—	—	76	— (Note: "Rhythm of Love" did not enter the Swiss Singles chart, but charted at number 50 on the Swiss Airplay chart.)	60	RIAA: Platinum	Wonders of the Younger
"Boomerang"	2011	—	—	—	—	—	—	—	—	—	—		Wonders of the Younger
"Nuttin' for Christmas"	2011	—	—	—	—	—	—	—	—	—	—		Non-album single
"Should've Gone to Bed"	2013	—	—	—	—	—	—	—	—	—	—		Should've Gone to Bed
"The Giving Tree"	2013	—	—	—	—	—	—	—	—	—	—		Should've Gone to Bed
"Pause"	2015	—	—	—	—	—	—	—	—	—	—		American Nights
"Land of the Living"	2017	—	—	—	—	—	—	—	—	—	—		Non-album single
"Light Up The Room"	2018	—	—	—	—	—	—	—	—	—	—		Parallel Universe
"Let's Lay Low"	2019	—	—	—	—	—	—	—	—	—	—		Parallel Universe
"Winter Wonderland"	2021	—	—	—	—	—	—	—	—	—	—		Non-album single
"Spaghetti Tattoo"	2023	—	—	—	—	—	—	—	—	—	—		Plain White T's
"Happy"	2023	—	—	—	—	—	—	—	—	—	—		Plain White T's
"Would You Even"	2023	—	—	—	—	—	—	—	—	—	—		Plain White T's
"Red Flags"	2023	—	—	—	—	—	—	—	—	—	—		Plain White T's
"—" denotes a recording that did not chart or was not released in that territory.

== Other appearances ==
Title	Year	Album
"Recluse" (Stacy Clark featuring Plain White T's)	2007	Apples and Oranges
"Little Miss Obsessive" (Ashlee Simpson featuring Tom Higgenson)	2008	Bittersweet World
"Bored of Your Love" (Meg and Dia featuring Tom Higgenson)	2009	Here, Here, and Here
"U and I" (Crash! Boom! Bang! featuring Tom Higgenson)	2009	Gold Rush
"What Would You Say?" (Breathe Electric featuring Tom Higgenson)	2009	Emotion

== Music videos ==
- "Stop" (2002)
- "Please Don't Do This" (2002)
- "Take Me Away" (2005)
- "Hey There Delilah" (2006)
- "Hate (I Really Don't Like You)" (2006)
- "Our Time Now" (2006)
- "Making a Memory" (2007)
- "Figure It Out" (2007)
- "Natural Disaster" (2008)
- "1,2,3,4" (two versions) (2008)
- "Sunlight" (2009)
- "Rhythm of Love" (2010)
- "Boomerang" (2011)
- "Pet Sematary" (Ramones cover) (2012)
- "Should've Gone to Bed" (2013)
- "The Giving Tree" (two versions, 2013)
- “Land of the Living” (2017)

== Compilation appearances ==
- "Bruises", from Oil: Chicago Punk Refined
- "Song 2" (Blur cover), on the album Punk Goes '90s
- "Season of a Lifetime", on the album Taste of Christmas
- "It's So Easy", on the album Sound of Superman
- "Better Luck Next Time", on the album Dead Bands Party: A Tribute to Oingo Boingo
- "When I See an Elephant Fly", on the album DisneyMania 6
- "Miss Kneel", on the album Elmhurst vs. Villa Park
- "Cell Phone Number" and "Move On" on the album Songs from a Scene
- "Poor Jack", on the album Nightmare Revisited (2008)
- "Natural Disaster", on the DVD Take Action: Volume 8
- "Welcome to Mystery" on the album Almost Alice (2010)
- "Pet Sematary" on the album Frankenweenie Unleashed! (2012)
- "Surface Pressure" from Encanto on the album A Whole New Sound (2024)
