= Loren Israel =

American record producer

- Born: Loren Israel
- Origin: Hollywood, California
- Genres: Rock, alternative rock, punk, pop punk
- Occupations: Musician, record producer, A&R, manager
- Instruments: Guitar, vocals
- Years active: 1997–present
- Website: http://www.bandbootcamp.com

Loren Israel is a Los Angeles–based music producer and record executive who specializes in developing independent artists. A manager and former A&R executive at Capitol Records, Israel is best known for working with bands such as Jimmy Eat World, Plain White T's, Neon Trees, Sugarcult, Less Than Jake and more.

== Biography ==
Loren Israel grew up in Hollywood, California, and later moved to the San Fernando Valley. His career in the music industry began at age 15, when he played in several bands. He toured the country with these bands, opening for bands like Bad Religion, the Sugarcubes, Soul Asylum, Social Distortion, the Damned, and the Smithereens. One successful band that he was in was called One Day, where he played guitar and wrote songs. Later, he switched gears and went to college. However, he could not stay away from music and put on several benefit concerts because he enjoyed it. As a result, he was scouted by an A&R executive who saw him at these shows, and ended up offering Loren an internship at Capitol Records. A few years later, Loren was offered a permanent job at Capitol as an A&R executive.

== Career ==
As an A&R executive for Capitol, Loren signed Less Than Jake and Jimmy Eat World. He independently produced and signed The Hippos to Interscope Records, and Automatic 7 to A&M / Vagrant Records. He served as an A&R consultant to Jimmy Eat World's self-titled CD for DreamWorks.

Outside of Capitol Records, Loren began developing independent artists in 2001. He worked extensively with Rock Kills Kid from 2001 to 2004 and produced and managed the band's first EP release on Fearless Records in 2003. This led to the band being signed to Reprise Records and in 2006 released their first major record label record, Are You Nervous?.

Loren also scouted and developed the Plain White T's. He produced and managed the band's first two albums Stop (2001) and All That We Needed (2005). He was directly responsible for the band establishing a marketing presence on MySpace with 200,000+ friends. The popularity of the band garnered them a deal with Hollywood Records in 2006 and released Every Second Counts September, 2006.

In addition, Loren worked on Sugarcult's 2006 album Lights Out. He worked as management for Neon Trees during the release of their album Habits.

He published The Sound of the Future. Songwriting in the Age of AI. in 2025.

Loren currently does A&R consulting for Virgin Records, Epic Records, and Warner Bros. Records, and also runs two companies. The first, Band Boot Camp, is a program in which Loren personally assists artists in the areas of songwriting, stage presence, and self marketing in a one-day workshop in a studio in Hollywood. The other, his Music Mentor Program, allows him to work with emerging artists on a more long-term basis.

== Discography ==
Year	Artist	Label	Role
2018	The Unlikely Candidates	Sony Music Entertainment	Executive Producer (album: Danger to Myself EP)
2017	The Unlikely Candidates	Century Media	Executive Producer (album: Bed of Liars EP)
2013	The Unlikely Candidates	Atlantic Records	Producer
2011	Marissa Jack	Warner Bros. Records	Artist development, management
2010	Neon Trees	Mercury Records	Artist development
2008	2 AM Club	J Records	Artist development
2008	Them Terribles		Artist development
2008	Ryan Gillmor	EMI Music	Producer, artist development (album: Counting the Days)
2008	The Airlines		Producer, artist development
2007	Midnight Hour	Interscope Records	Producer, artist development
2007	Lala		Artist development
2006	Plain White T's	Hollywood Records	Artist development (album: Every Second Counts}
2006	Sugarcult	Fearless Records	Artist development (album: Lights Out)
2006	Rock Kills Kid	Reprise Records	Artist development (album: Are You Nervous?)
2006	Stacy Clark		Executive producer, artist development (album: Unusual)
2005	Plain White T's	Fearless Records	A&R, executive producer (album: All That We Needed)
2003	Rock Kills Kid	Fearless Records	Producer
2003	Death on Wednesday		Producer (album: Songs to To)
2002	Plain White T's	Fearless Records	Producer, artist development (album: Stop)
2001	Jimmy Eat World	DreamWorks	A&R (album: Bleed American)
1997	The Hippos	Fueled by Ramen/Vagrant Records	Producer (album: Forget the World)
1996	Automatic 7	BYO Records	Producer
