= Hate (I Really Don't Like You) =

Single by Plain White T's

from the album Every Second Counts
- Released: August 15, 2006
- Recorded: 2006
- Genre: Emo
- Length: 3:45
- Label: Hollywood, Fearless
- Songwriter(s): Tom Higgenson
- Producer(s): Johnny K

Plain White T's singles chronology
"Hey There Delilah" (2006)	"Hate (I Really Don't Like You)" (2006)	"Our Time Now" (2007)

"Hate (I Really Don't Like You)" is a song by the Plain White T's. It was the first single from their fourth studio album Every Second Counts, released in 2006. This song has an acoustic version available on the Best Buy version of Every Second Counts. The song became one of the band's highest charting singles.

== Music video ==
The video has been seen on MTV, Kerrang!, MTV2 and Fuse TV. The music video shows lead singer Tom Higgenson taking a stroll in the city while many scenes of chaos are happening. It also has shots of the band performing in what seems to be a warehouse. His ex-girlfriend, played by Italia Ricci, comes along, and in surprise continues to watch him perform. It was filmed in Toronto, Canada.

== Track listings ==
Promo CD single

1. "Hate (I Really Don't Like You)" (album version) — 3:45
2. "Hate (I Really Don't Like You)" (instrumental) — 3:45
3. "Hate (I Really Don't Like You)" (acoustic demo) — 3:28

Digital download

1. "Hate (I Really Don't Like You)" (album version) — 3:45

== In popular culture ==
- It has been released in Australia through The Hot Hits.
- It featured on the Saints Row 2 soundtrack.
- It featured on an episode of the second season of The Hills.

== Weekly charts ==
Chart (2007–2008)	Peak position
Scotland (OCC)	44
UK Singles (OCC)	53
US Billboard Hot 100	68
US Alternative Airplay (Billboard)	25
