= The Hippos (album) =

Studio album by The Hippos
- Released: November 9, 2003
- Recorded: June–September 2000
- Genre: Power pop, synthpop, pop-punk
- Label: Olympic Records, Fanscape Music
- Producer: Ariel Rechtshaid

The Hippos chronology
Heads Are Gonna Roll (1999)	The Hippos (2003)

The Hippos is the third and final album by the Los Angeles, California rock band The Hippos, released in 2003 by Olympic Records and Fanscape Music. It was released posthumously after their breakup in 2002. The material for the album had been recorded in 2000 after the departure of original drummer Kyle Briggs, but even while working on it the other band members had begun to drift into other musical projects and eventually the album was shelved and the group disbanded. However, due to numerous requests from fans in the years immediately following the material was resurrected and released independently, mostly at the behest of lead singer Ariel Rechtshaid. It was promoted as "the album they wanted their fans to hear" and its cover art includes the message "Suonava tra: Marzo del 1996 e Settembre del 2000. Grazie per tutto. Fine," which from Italian loosely translates to "Created music from March 1996 to September 2000. Thanks for everything. The end."

Musically the album completed the band's transition from third wave ska and ska-punk to power pop, marking a departure from the Southern California ska scene from which they had spawned. It relies heavily on the use of synthesizers and keyboards as opposed to the horn-driven arrangements of their early releases. To illustrate this the album's cover shows several analog synthesizers including the Korg VC-10 Vocoder and ARP 2600 Semi-modular Synthesizer.

The last five tracks of the album are listed as "bonus tracks" on the sleeve. When the album was originally tracked in 2000 these songs were not included, but once the band decided to put out the album as their final release they elected to include them.

== Track listing ==
All songs written by Rechtshaid/Castle/Bairian

1. "We're Here"
2. "Summertime"
3. "Hold On"
4. "I Know"
5. "Run Away and Hide"
6. "Slow it Down"
7. "Bad Grammar"
8. "Say You Love Me"
9. "Your Time Has Come"
10. "Going Home"
11. "Los Angeles"*
12. "Beats Don't Stop"*
13. "Australia"*
14. "Stephen"*
15. "Thinking of You"*

*Tracks 11–15 are listed as "bonus tracks" on the album. Although they appear on all pressings, when the album was originally planned these tracks were omitted. However, since the band decided that this would be their final release, they elected to include these tracks rather than cut them.

== Personnel ==
- Ariel Rechtshaid - vocals, guitar, keyboards, programming, percussion
- James Bairian - bass
- Louis Castle - trumpet, vocals, keyboards, programming
- Rich Zahniser - trombone, keyboards, programming
- Danny Rukasin - trombone
- Blair Sinta - drums, percussion
- Nate Morton - drums, percussion
- Garrett Ray - drums

== Album information ==
- Record label: Olympic Records, Fanscape Music
- Produced, engineered, and mixed by Ariel Rechtshaid
- Recorded and mixed in Ariel Rechtshaid's garage in Van Nuys, California June–September 2000
- Mastered by Mike Bozzi at Bernie Grundman Mastering in Hollywood, California
- Digitally edited by Andrew Garver
- All songs written by Ariel Rechtshaid, Louis Castle, and James Bairian
- Cover photograph by James Bairian
- Artwork concept by Ariel Rechtshaid
