= Lost It =

Lost It may refer to:

- "Lost It", song by Boz Scaggs from Some Change
- "Lost It", song by Rich the Kid from The World Is Yours
- "Lost It", a song by ska punk band The Hippos from Heads Are Gonna Roll
