= Forget the World =

Forget the World may refer to:

- Forget the World (Afrojack album)
- Forget the World (The Hippos album)
