= LØLØ =

Canadian singer-songwriter

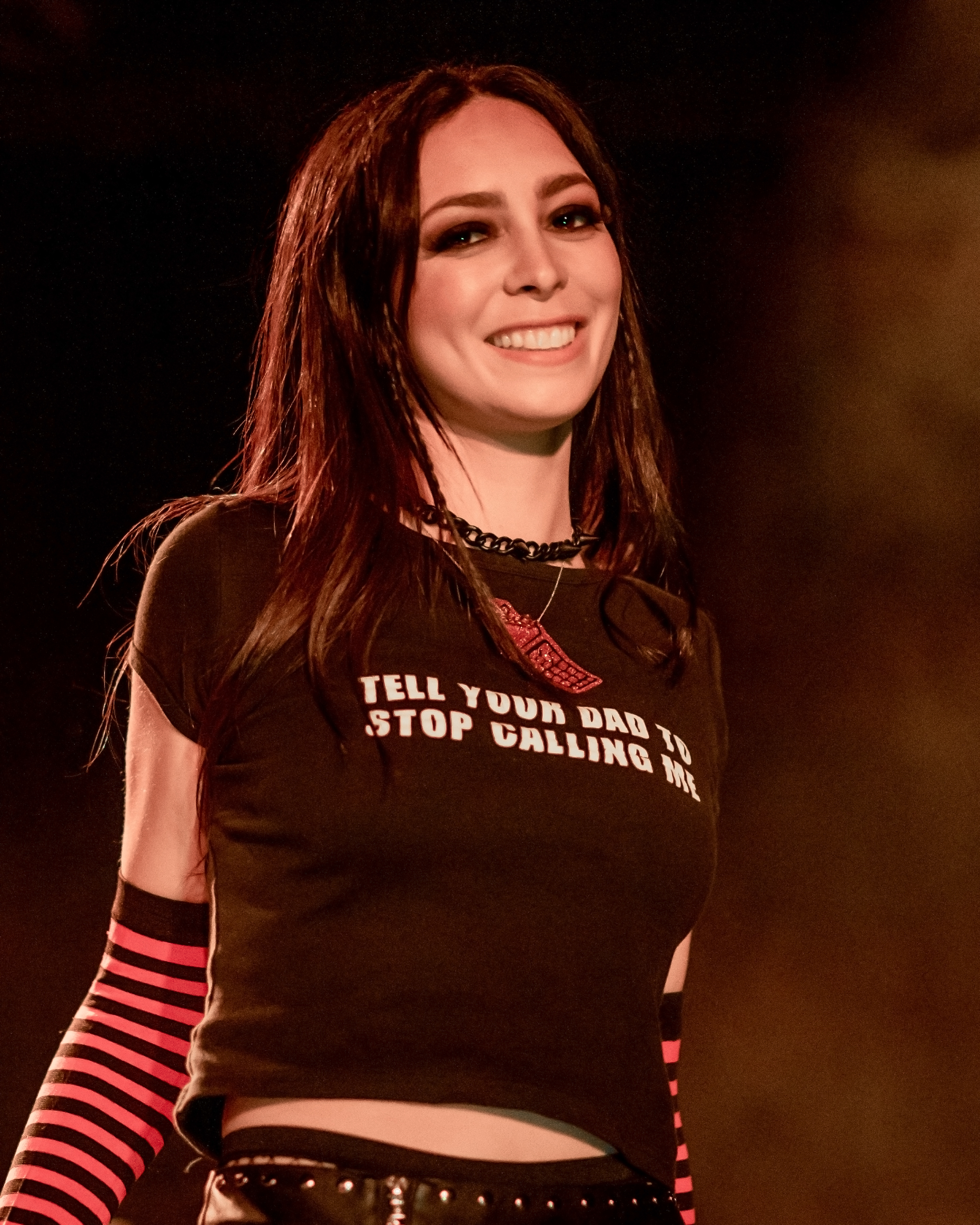

Background information
- Born: Lauren Mandel; Toronto, Ontario, Canada
- Genres: Pop; pop rock; pop-punk; indie pop; alternative pop
- Occupations: Singer; songwriter; guitarist
- Years active: 2018–present
- Labels: Fearless; Hopeless
- Website: itslolomusic.com

Instagram information
- Page: lolo
- Followers: 318 thousand

TikTok information
- Page: lolopopgurl
- Followers: 178 thousand

YouTube information
- Channel: lolopopgurl
- Views: 21.7 million
- Last updated: May 15, 2026

Lauren Mandel, known by her stage name LØLØ, is a Canadian singer-songwriter. She has released two albums, falling for robots & wishing i was one (2024) and god forbid a girl spits out her feelings! (2026) as well as four EPs.

== Early life ==
Mandel was born and raised in Toronto. She has a younger sister and a younger brother. As a child, she idolized Shirley Temple, studied tap dancing, and dreamed of performing in Broadway theatre.

In the 9th grade, she started taking guitar lessons to keep up with her younger sister. Her guitar teacher, Elliott Bernstein, taught her to play songs by Green Day, her favorite band. He also forced her to write her own songs and gave her encouragement.

Mandel got her start performing at open mics around Toronto. She initially used the stage name Lo Lo, but later stylized it as LØLØ to avoid conflict with American singer Lolo.

== Career ==
Mandel independently released her debut single, "Yours", in 2018. It reached number 21 on Canadian radio. She was also named an IHeartRadio Future Star.

Her debut EP, Sweater Collection, was released in May 2019.

That same year, she released a cover of Bruce Springsteen's "Dancing in the Dark".

During the COVID-19 lockdowns, Mandel gained greater popularity on TikTok with a series of alternate POV covers of popular songs, including Taylor Swift's "Betty", The Kid Laroi's "Without You", and Adele's "Someone Like You".

In June of that year, she released the single "Dead Inside", and the following month she filmed an exclusive bedroom performance of the song for Ones to Watch.

This and two subsequent singles, "Hate U" and "Dear First Love,", were announced as part of a sophomore EP entitled Permanent Damage, but the EP did not materialize.

In February 2021, Mandel signed a publishing deal with APG. A new single, "lonely & pathetic", was released shortly after the announcement.

In October 2021, Mandel signed to Hopeless Records and released the single "u look stupid".

In February 2022, Mandel collaborated with Maggie Lindemann on the single "debbie downer". They had met during a writing session. The song and music video reference the 2000 film Bring It On.

Two more singles were released over the next few months: "junkie", whose video pays homage to the crime drama Breaking Bad, and "THE FLOOR IS LAVA!!".

A third EP, Debbie Downer, was released in September via Hopeless.

In October, she teamed up with Simple Plan for an Amazon Music-exclusive 20th anniversary rerecording of the latter's song "I'm Just a Kid".

In March 2023, she released "5, 6, 7, 8", a collaboration with Travis Mills' band Girlfriends, with production by John Feldmann, The Futuristics, and Brock. She was announced to perform at that spring's Slam Dunk Festival in May. In July, she released a new single, "hot girls in hell", and embarked on a fall US tour supporting Boys Like Girls, State Champs, and the Summer Set on the former's Speaking Our Language Tour.

She released two more singles, "faceplant" and the acoustic song "*snow in berlin*", before the year's end.

In January 2024, she was included on "The Sound of 2024" list of "new artists redefining alternative music" by Kerrang!. That same month, she released the single "2 of us". Another single, "poser" was released the following month.

In April 2024, she released her single "u & the tinman". She later released her debut album Falling for Robots and Wishing I Was One in June 2024.

In September 2024, LØLØ covered "Let It Go" for A Whole New Sound, a compilation album featuring pop-punk covers of songs from classic Disney films.

In February 2025, she released the deluxe edition of falling for robots and wishing i was one (deluxe).

Her second full album, god forbid a girl spits out her feelings!, was released in April 2026.

== Artistry ==
Mandel's music has been described as alternative pop, indie pop, alternative rock, pop rock, pop-punk, grunge, bedroom pop, and bubblegum pop. Her sound has been compared to Green Day, Avril Lavigne, Paramore, Renforshort, Charlotte Sands, Upsahl, Wens, Liz Lokre, and BRDGS.

Mandel has cited Green Day, Avril Lavigne, Simple Plan, Weezer, Hilary Duff, Taylor Swift, Julia Michaels, Alanis Morissette, Boygenius, and Broadway musicals as inspirations.

In regards to her genre, Mandel has said, "I feel like I have a couple of different sides to me — one being upbeat, like pop rock, and another one being more singer-songwriter-y, and I try to get both of those elements in my songs. [...] Everyone always calls it pop punk, when I don't think that it's pop punk at all. But I'm like, you know what? Call my music whatever you want." She has described her music as "psychotically sentimental".

== Personal life ==
LØLØ suffered a fall in March 2023, breaking her nose, chin, and jaw and requiring four stitches and implants. The incident left her unable to open her mouth for several months, and inspired her song "faceplant".

In March 2026, she broke up with her boyfriend.

== Discography ==
=== Studio albums ===
List of studio albums, with select release details
Title	Details
falling for robots & wishing i was one	Released: June 7, 2024; Deluxe Edition released: February 7, 2025; Label: Hopeless; Formats: CD, digital download, vinyl
god forbid a girl spits out her feelings!	Released: April 17, 2026; Label: Fearless; Formats: CD, digital download

=== Extended plays ===
List of extended plays, with select release details
Title	Details
Sweater Collection	Released: May 3, 2019; Label: Independent; Formats: Digital download
Overkill	Released: November 12, 2021; Label: Hopeless; Formats: Digital download
debbie downer	Released: September 30, 2022; Label: Hopeless; Formats: Digital download
u & the tin man	Released: April 4, 2024; Label: Hopeless; Formats: Digital download

=== Singles ===
List of singles, with selected chart positions
Title	Year	Peak chart positions		Album
Title	Year	CAN CHR	CAN HAC	Album
"Yours"	2018	33	27	Sweater Collection
"Dancing in the Dark"	2019	—	—	Non-album single
"Stranger's Arms" (Remix)	2019	—	—	Sweater Collection
"Dead Inside"	2020	—	—	Non-album singles
"Hate U"	2020	—	—	Non-album singles
"Dear First Love,"	2020	—	—	Non-album singles
"lonely & pathetic"	2021	—	—	overkill
"death wish"	2021	—	—	overkill
"die without u"	2021	—	—	overkill
"u look stupid"	2021	—	—	overkill
"christmas vacation"	2021	—	—	Non-album single
"debbie downer" (ft. Maggie Lindemann)	2022	—	—	debbie downer
"junkie"	2022	—	—	debbie downer
"THE FLOOR IS LAVA!!"	2022	—	—	debbie downer
"u turn me on (but u give me depression)"	2022	—	—	falling for robots & wishing i was one
"5,6,7,8" (ft. girlfriends)	2023	—	—	Non-album single
"faceplant"	2023	—	—	falling for robots and wishing i was one
"omg"	2023	—	—	falling for robots and wishing i was one
"hot girls in hell"	2023	—	—	falling for robots and wishing i was one
"*snow in berlin*"	2023	—	—	falling for robots and wishing i was one
"2 of us"	2024	—	—	falling for robots and wishing i was one
"poser"	2024	—	—	falling for robots and wishing i was one
"DON'T"	2024	—	—	falling for robots and wishing i was one
"the devil wears converse"	2025	—	—	god forbid a girl spits out her feelings!
"american zombie"	2025	—	—	god forbid a girl spits out her feelings!
"me with no shirt on"	2025	—	—	god forbid a girl spits out her feelings!
"007"	2026	—	—	god forbid a girl spits out her feelings!
"the punisher"	2026	13	14	god forbid a girl spits out her feelings!
"pretty little wreck"	2026	—	—	Non-album single
"—" denotes a recording that did not chart or was not released to that format.

=== Featured singles ===
List of singles as a featured artist
Title	Year	Album
"Last Christmas" (Virginia to Vegas featuring Tyler Shaw, LØLØ, New Friends, noelle, and Shawn Hook)	2023	Non-album single
"Nervous System" (Taylor Acorn featuring LØLØ)	2025	Survival in Motion (Deluxe)
"Hey There Delilah" (Plain White T's featuring LØLØ)	2026	Non-album single

=== Other appearances ===
List of songs appearing on other artists' albums or compilations
Title	Other artist(s)	Year	Album
PTLD	Vanic	2021	Here & Now
"The Internet"	MILES	2022	Never Have I Ever
"till the day i ___"	carobae	2023	still scared to go to sleep
"Permanent Damage"	Joshua Golden	2023	Ellie
"Let It Go"	—N/a	2024	A Whole New Sound
"Be OK"	Letdown.	2024	Be OK
"Reasons - TDWP Version"	The Devil Wears Prada	2024	Chemical (Acoustic)
"Perfect"	—N/a	2026	Mile End Kicks

=== Music videos ===
Year	Title	Director
2018	"Yours"	Justin Alexis
2019	"Stranger's Arms (Remix)"	Justin Alexis
2020	"Hate U"	Iris Kim
2020	"Dear First Love,"	Justin Alexis
2021	"lonely & pathetic"	Justin Alexis
2021	"death wish"	Justin Alexis
2021	"die without u"	Justin Alexis
2021	"u look stupid"	Justin Alexis
2021	"hurt less"	Justin Alexis
2022	"debbie downer"	Jake Johnston
2022	"junkie"	Jake Johnston
2022	"THE FLOOR IS LAVA!!"	Qran Zhu
2022	"u turn me on (but u give me depression)"	Justin Alexis
2022	"boohoo"	Jake Johnston
2023	"omg"	Jake Woodbridge
2023	"hot girls in hell"	Justin Alexis
2023	"faceplant"	Justin Alexis
2024	"2 of us"	Justin Alexis
2024	"poser"	Josiah Van Dien
2024	"kill the girl"	Justin Alexis
2024	"Don't"	Justin Alexis
2025	"Possibility"	Justin Alexis
2025	"the devil wears converse"	Justin Alexis
2025	"american zombie"	Deathcats
2025	"me with no shirt on"	Whitney Otte
2026	"007"	thatgoodgraphic
2026	"dumbest girl in the world"	Whitney Otte

== Tours and shows ==
=== Opening act ===
- "Pop Punk's Still Not Dead" - Simple Plan and New Found Glory (September 2021)
- New Found Glory, Less Than Jake, and Hot Mulligan (October 2021: United States)
- Leah Kate - Alive & Unwell Tour (October–November 2022)
- Against the Current (November–December 2023: UK & Europe)
- Jxdn - When the Music Stops Tour (July 2024)
- Simple Plan - "Bigger Than You Think" tour (August–September 2025)

=== Headliner ===
- "U Tour Me On" (UK and Europe: October–November 2025 and June 2025; United States and Toronto: February–March 2025)

=== Festivals ===
- Lollapalooza (2022)
- Sad Summer Festival (2022)
- All Your Friends (August 2024)

=== Table ===
Tour name	Participating bands	Participating from – to	Locations
Pop Punk's Still Not Dead Tour	New Found Glory, Less Than Jake, Hot Mulligan, LØLØ	August 31 – October 17, 2021	US
Sad Summer Fest	Waterparks, LØLØ, Neck Deep, Mayday Parade, Hot Mulligan, Hot Milk	July 23 – August 5, 2022	US
Alive & Unwell Tour	Leah Kate, LØLØ	October 28 – November 20, 2022	UK, Europe
Speaking Our Language Tour	Boys Like Girls, LØLØ, State Champs, The Summer Set, 3OH!3	September 17 – November 1, 2023	US
When the Music Stops Tour	Jxdn, LØLØ, Gunnar	July 6–28, 2024	US
Nightmares & Daydreams Tour	Against the Current, LØLØ	November 10 – December 6, 2023	Europe, UK
The Force of Nature Tour	Marianas Trench, LØLØ	November 16 – December 12, 2024	Canada
U TOUR ME ON	LØLØ, Gus (UK, Europe, US & Canada), Ella Red (US)	October 22 - November 3, 2024 (UK & Europe); February 9 - March 14, 2025 (US & Canada); June 9–10, 2025 (Europe)	UK, Europe, US, Canada
Bigger Than You Think! Tour	Simple Plan, Bowling for Soup, 3OH!3, LØLØ	August 9 - September 6, 2025	US
god forbid a girl goes on tour!	LØLØ, Ella Red (UK & Europe)	April 25 - May 13, 2026 (UK & Europe); September 17 - October 26, 2026 (US & Canada)	UK, Europe, US, Canada
