= PassmoreLab =

San Diego-based stereoscopic 3D film studio

- Type: Private
- Industry: Film and Television
- Founded: August 2001
- Founder: Greg Passmore
- Headquarters: San Diego, California, USA
- Key people: Greg Passmore, CEO Jennifer Hilbert, CFO James Humann, Director of Business Affairs and Development Sabine Bredow, Senior Production Coordinator
- Products: Library of films and music videos
- Services: 3D conversion of catalog films, new releases, documentaries, trailers, commercials, and music videos. Native 3D production services for features, shorts, documentaries, commercials, and music videos.
- Website: http://www.passmorelab.com

PassmoreLab is a San Diego–based stereoscopic 3D film studio that specializes in conversion of 2D films to 3D format, native 3D film productions, and 3D film distribution.

== Background ==
As an independent film production company, PassmoreLab produces its own 3D films, including science and nature shorts, broadcast television programming, and documentary and feature films. It also has a separate distribution and sales division that licenses 3D content to independent theaters, science centers, museums, planetarium, 3D television broadcasts, and 3D mobile devices.

PassmoreLab licenses its conversion technology and also converts films “in-house.” Films Passmore has worked on include Plan 9 from Outer Space, the restored, colorized version of Night of the Living Dead, Iron Doors, The Nutcracker in 3D, and Ocean Voyagers narrated by Meryl Streep. The company also does production for music videos and has worked alongside Osaka Popstar, Slash, Plain White T's, Semi Precious Weapons, Linkin Park, and Devo.

== History ==
In 2007, PassmoreLab announced development of its prototype multi-camera array, and by 2008 the lab had created a 3D documentary film on Burning Man. Passmore then expanded its work to include stereoscopic microscopy. The company began converting Ripley’s film archives into 3D format. The company produced a music video with Sammy Hagar, won several awards at the inaugural 3-D Film & Interactive Festival (3DFF) held in Orlando and Cocoa Beach, Florida. The company also converted the film Night of the Living Dead into 3D format.

In 2009, PassmoreLab converted MGM Studios simulator ride Stargate 3000 from 2D to 3D. and with its conversion of Anthony Lucas' 1999 claymation film Slim Pickings, became the first in the industry to convert clay animation to 3D.

In 2009 ABC News Nightline interviewed company founder Greg Passmore about his new science documentary "The Extreme Nature of Bats". PassmoreLab also completed and premiered their 3D conversion of Night of the Living Dead, Now in 3D! at the Hollywood Forever Cemetery as a part of the 5th Annual Johnny Ramone Memorial Tribute.

In 2010, PassmoreLab held the world premiere of its psychological thriller feature film Iron Doors 3D. The film won 'Best 3D Feature Film' (Narrative) at the Hollywood 3D Film Festival, and then screened at the Raindance Film Festival in London, the Hof International Film Festival in Germany, and American Film Market in Los Angeles. Also in 2010, Passmore completed the first-ever 3D music video for Slash's By the Sword with Andrew Stockdale, and Beautiful Dangerous with Fergie. as well as completing 3D music videos for Linkin Park's Waiting for the End, and for Hollywood Records' Plain White T's Rhythm of Love. PassmoreLab also became the first content provider to broadcast a 3D title, by sharing Slash’s By the Sword music video on Rogers Communications 3DTV Cable Channel, and announced their partnership with Feodor Pitcairn Productions to create Ocean Voyagers in 3D. Passmore film Night of the Living Dead, Now in 3D! began its theatrical run with National Amusements in the US and UK. The lab's film The Extreme Nature of Bats won the award for 'Best Short Documentary' at the Arizona Underground Film Festival and the award for 'Best Cinematography' at the Dark Carnival Film Festival in Bloomington, Illinois, and premiered in Transylvania on Halloween as a moving theatre ride. PassmoreLab also completed 3D production on Ed Wood's horror film Plan 9 from Outer Space, and presented Night of the Living Dead in 3D. 2010 also had PassmoreLab signing a $200 million 3D conversion deal with Grizzly Adams Productions, completing their tutorial video Shooting 3D for beginner filmmakers, premiering Physics of Surfing at the 3D Film Festival in Hollywood, and selling Microworlds to Discovery Channel 3D.

In 2011, PassmoreLab announced a 2-Year content licensing deal with NVIDIA for new web-based content portal deliver. In March 2011, the company debuted their 3D music videos and science adventure content at CeBIT Live in Hannover, Germany, and Plan 9 from Outer Space, Now in 3D! premiered at the Cinequest Film Festival in San Jose. In May 2011, PassmoreLab announced conversion of the Starfish Cove animated series and in June the company finished conversion of Feodor Pitcairn’s Ocean Voyagers, and Linkin Park’s Transformers: Dark of the Moon theme song, "Iridescent", which has screened in select theaters nationwide. In July 2011, Nintendo premiered PassmoreLab's 3D animated short film, "Sunday Jog", as part of an initiative to help launch the Nintendo 3DS' 3D streaming service, Nintendo Video. Also in July, Passmorelab, in conjunction with The Collective, converted Memphis High's latest music video, Criminal Love, into 3D.

In 2012, the company completed a 3D production titled Flower Power, it converted the film Fighter Pilot to 3D and released the film Fighter Pilot 3D at the Museum of Flight in Seattle, Washington, and began work on a 3D series titled Glimpse 3D.
