= Orange County ska =

Orange County Ska refers to the Ska Punk music scene from Orange County, California, United States.

The Orange County third wave ska scene during the 1990s was large and influential. Many of the bands that emerged from that scene continue to have success, with some moving into other music genres.

Anaheim's No Doubt has had the most enduring commercial success of the Orange County ska bands. They had several #1 singles and a diamond-certified album, Tragic Kingdom. In the mid-1980s, No Doubt used to open for Los Angeles bands such as The Untouchables and Fishbone.

Another third wave ska band originating in Orange County that had commercial success is Reel Big Fish, whose song "Sell Out" reached #10 on the Billboard Modern Rock charts in 1997. The Hippos and Save Ferris have experienced some commercial success with the albums "Heads Are Gonna Roll" and "It Means Everything", respectively. Both acts were featured on several major film soundtracks during the 1990s. The Aquabats remain one of the few original Orange County third wave ska bands who still play today. However, the band generally doesn't play ska-influenced music in their most recent release, Charge!!. The same applies to Goldfinger, who, despite once being an active forerunner in the scene, dropped the ska sound in 2001.

After emerging out of Orange County's suburban ska scene in the 1990s, the band Pharmaceutical Bandits later became known as Rx Bandits and altered their sound to embrace pop punk, emo and prog rock influences. The band's members met at Los Alamitos High School in Orange County, where members of Save Ferris, Reel Big Fish and Bad Religion were also students. Reno ska jazz band Keyser Soze has Southern California roots, including members from Orange County and Los Angeles (which borders Orange County).

== Notable bands ==
- The Aquabats
- The Forces of Evil
- Goldfinger
- The Hippos
- Jeffries Fan Club
- Mealticket
- My Superhero
- GOGO13
- No Doubt
- O.C. Supertones
- Reel Big Fish
- Rx Bandits
- Save Ferris
- Slightly Stoopid
- Starpool
- Sublime
- Suburban Legends
- Suburban Rhythm
