= American Nights =

Studio album by Plain White T's
- Released: March 31, 2015
- Genre: Alternative rock, indie rock
- Length: 36:18
- Label: MRI
- Producer: Augie Schmidt; Dan Monahan; Plain White T's; Sam Kearney; Sam Sumser; Sean Small; Ian Kirkpatrick; Mudrock; Nick Rucker

Plain White T's chronology
| Should've Gone to Bed (2013) | American Nights (2015) | Parallel Universe (2018) |

Singles from American Nights
- 1. "Pause" Released: February 20, 2015

American Nights is the seventh studio album by American rock band Plain White T's. It was released by Megaforce Records on March 31, 2015. The album spawned only one single: "Pause".

== Background ==
American Nights was originally scheduled for a 2014 release by Hollywood Records. During production, however, the band had creative disagreements with the label's executives, which led Hollywood to delay the album's release. Lead vocalist Tom Higgenson said of the conflict, "They were pushing for songs that the band wasn't 100 percent on. It was kind of like, 'You don't want us to record this song that everybody loves, but you want us to do this one that one of the five guys don't like at all?' It was a really annoying process." After the album was completed, the band decided to leave Hollywood Records altogether and recut the album according to their vision.

== Promotion ==
On March 25, 2015, the band premiered the music video for "Pause" on Billboard, produced in affiliation with Lipton's "Be More Tea" campaign. Directed by Mike Venezia, the video starts out as a "derailed road trip" turning into "a roadside concert", and culminating into "an all-out desert party". The video also featured actor Thomas Ian Nicholas. On November 23, the band released the music video for the album's title track, directed by Pete Jones. The video stars Higgenson's then 6-year old son Lennon, fronting a grade-school version of the band and falling in love along the way. Three days later, the band performed the title track at the 89th annual Macy's Thanksgiving Day Parade, as part of the Royal Caribbean International float.

== Critical reception ==
Professional ratings
Review scores
| Source | Rating |
|---|---|
| AllMusic | 3.5/5 stars |
| Renowned for Sound | 2.5/5 stars |

AllMusic's Stephen Thomas Erlewine noted how the band took stabs at replicating Vampire Weekend ("Heavy Rotation") and Mumford & Sons ("Dance Off Time") throughout the album while also "alternating between giddy, gilded AAA pop ("American Nights," "Never Working") and fleet-footed acoustic ditties ("Time to Move On"). He concluded that, "As befitting their plain-Jane name, there's nothing particularly flashy about the pop of Plain White T's, but on American Nights they construct it and execute it as well as they ever have." Andja Curcic of Renowned for Sound felt the record was at odds with itself over its track listing, praising the title track, "Pause" and "Never Working" for their pop-rock/pop-punk elements but found the folk aesthetics of "Dance Off Time" and "Here Comes That Sunrise" oft-putting, saying that "In the end, the tracks don’t fit together and you wonder what the Plain White T’s are trying to achieve." She concluded that, "Though there are decent tracks on the album, I felt quite disappointed because nothing felt as honest and emotional as "Hey There Delilah". The Plain White T’s are really good at pop-rock ballads and I think that is where they should stay."

== Track listing ==
| No. | Title | Length |
|---|---|---|
| 1. | "American Nights" | 3:13 |
| 2. | "Pause" | 3:11 |
| 3. | "Never Working" | 2:58 |
| 4. | "Heavy Rotation" | 2:59 |
| 5. | "Stay" | 3:23 |
| 6. | "You Belong" | 3:43 |
| 7. | "Dance Off Time" | 3:42 |
| 8. | "Someday You're Gonna Love Me" | 4:04 |
| 9. | "Love Again" | 2:58 |
| 10. | "Time to Move On" | 3:03 |
| 11. | "Here Come that Sunrise" | 3:06 |
