= The Hippos =

American rock band

- Origin: Los Angeles, California
- Genres: Ska; ska punk; pop rock; synth-pop; power pop
- Years active: 1995–2002
- Labels: Fueled by Ramen; Vagrant; Interscope; Olympic; Stiff Dog
- Past members: Ariel Rechtshaid; Louis Castle; Danny Rukasin; Kyle Briggs; James Bairian; Brandon Bairian; Roman Flyscher; Rich Zahniser; Nate Morton; Garrett Ray; Blair Sinta

The Hippos were an American rock band formed in 1995 in Los Angeles, California, and disbanded in 2002. The band released three full-length albums. Their early work is best classified as part of the third wave of ska music, or as ska-punk, though in the later years of their career the band transitioned to a more synthesizer-driven power pop and rock sound.

== Band history ==
=== Formation ===
The Hippos formed in Los Angeles, California in 1995 with a lineup of Ariel Rechtshaid on vocals and guitar, James Bairian on bass, Louis Castle on trumpet, Danny Rukasin on trombones, Roman Flyscher on saxophone, James' older brother Brandon Bairian on auxiliary percussion, and Kyle Briggs on drums. They self-released two cassette demos entitled Spreading the Cheese and Attack of the Killer Cheese and began playing shows around southern California, establishing themselves among a prolific ska scene including bands such as Reel Big Fish, No Doubt, Buck-O-Nine, Dance Hall Crashers, Save Ferris, and The Aquabats.

=== Forget the World ===
By 1996, the band added Rich Zahniser, formerly of The Goodwin Club, on trombone and had attracted the attention of Fueled by Ramen Records and Stiff Dog Records and entered the studio with producer Loren Israel to record their first album, Forget the World. Jointly released February 1997 through Fueled by Ramen and Stiff Dog Records, the album was essentially a traditional ska punk effort focusing on upbeat tempos and heavy brass instrumentation. It afforded the band their first national tours at a time when ska and punk rock were gaining national attention. The band toured on and off in support of Forget the World for over a year. In 1998, the band's relationship with Stiff Dog Records ended and the record was re-pressed, this time by Vagrant Records. Around this time saxophone player Roman Fleysher and auxiliary percussion player Brandon Bairian both left the band, with Roman going on to join The Mighty Mighty Bosstones. A track from the album, “Irie”, was used on the soundtrack of the movie The Extreme Adventures of Super Dave, which was released straight to video in January 2000.

=== Heads Are Gonna Roll ===
By 1999 the band had signed to major label Interscope Records and released their second album, Heads Are Gonna Roll. Musically the album found the band transitioning to a more power pop sound, using fewer ska rhythms and instead incorporating synthesizers. It was their most successful album and their only major-label release. The song “Wasting My Life” received airplay on some radio stations and had a music video directed by The Malloys. The band toured the United States and Australia in support of the album, including stints on the Warped Tour during 1999 and 2000.

=== Final days and beyond ===
In early 2000, during tours in support of Heads Are Gonna Roll, drummer Kyle Briggs left the group. Over the next few years the band rehearsed and recorded new songs with Nate Morton, Blair Sinta, and Garrett Ray, expanding their use of keyboards, synthesizers, and programming. However, the members drifted into other projects and it became apparent that the band would not continue on together. Though they played their last show in Australia in late 2000, the Hippos officially announced they had broken up on December 15, 2002. On November 11, 2003 they released a posthumous self-titled album through Olympic Records. The product of several months of recording demos in 2000, the album completed their transition from traditional ska punk to synth-driven power pop.

Following the band's breakup, the members moved on to other musical projects. Louis Castle and James Bairian formed the now defunct band Dirty Little Secret. They later co-founded and currently operate a commercial music house called Headquarters Music. They have done film scoring, starting with the direct-to-video title Connor’s War in 2006, which was directed by Castle's father Nick Castle. As The Gifted, the duo handle music production and composition, and scored Southbound, a 2015 Horror anthology film. They have also scored or contributed music to XX, Body at Brighton Rock, and Ready or Not.

Ariel Rechtshaid played in Dirty Little Secret for a brief period before joining the group Foreign Born, but more recently has focused exclusively on music production and songwriting work, working with artists such as Haim, Vampire Weekend, Taking Back Sunday, We Are Scientists, Plain White Tees, Cass McCombs, Snoop Dogg, and many more. In addition to being nominated for Producer of the Year Grammy at the 2014 Grammy Awards, two albums featuring his production work have won Grammy awards: Modern Vampires of the City by Vampire Weekend won Best Alternative Music Album at the 2014 Grammy Awards and 25 by Adele won Album of the Year at the 2017 Grammy Awards.

Rich Zahniser formed the now defunct band Southbase, performed as a touring member with several bands, and is active in music production and composition as one half of The Trust.

Danny Rukasin became an Artist Manager for developing artists Hellogoodbye, Man Overboard, the producer Eric Palmquist, his former bandmates James Bairian and Louis Castle (The Gifted), later discovered and co-managing Billie Eilish and Finneas O'Connell, co-founded a Music Management Company, Best Friends Music, and also started managing Role Model, Bishop Briggs, and others.

Saxophone player Roman Fleysher went on to join The Mighty Mighty Bosstones in 1998 and played with them for several years.

Kyle Briggs went on to form the band Tripod, in which he played from 2000 to 2003. In 2006 he relocated to Portland, Oregon where he released a solo album under the name Long Distance Runner and joined the bands Junkface and Pine. He has also acted as editor, sound mixer, producer, and composer as well.

Nate Morton, who drummed on some tracks on The Hippos (2003) and toured with the band in the U.S. after the departure of Briggs, is now the drummer of the house band of The Voice, among many other accomplishments.

Garrett Ray, another of three drummers on The Hippos (2003), was the original drummer of Dirty Little Secret and Foreign Born, and is currently a frequent collaborator with Rechtshaid on the records he produces.

Blair Sinta, the final of the three drummers on The Hippos (2003) and the touring drummer for their final Australian tour, has toured with Josh Groban, Alanis Morissette, Annie Lennox, and Stevie Nicks among many others, and now runs a home drum tracking business.

== Members ==
Final lineup

- Ariel Rechtshaid – lead vocals, guitar, keyboards (1995–2002)
- James Bairian – bass, backing vocals (1995–2002)
- Blair Sinta – drums (2000–2002); drums on The Hippos
- Louis Castle – trumpet, keyboards, backing vocals (1995–2002)
- Danny Rukasin – trombone (1995–2002)
- Rich Zahniser – trombone, keyboards, backing vocals (1996–2002)

Previous members

- Roman Flyscher – saxophone (1995–1997)
- Brandon Bairian – percussion (1995–1997)
- Kyle Briggs – drums (1995–2000)
- Nate Morton – drums (2000); drums on The Hippos
- Garrett Ray – drums (2000); drums on The Hippos

Timeline

== Discography ==
=== Albums ===
Year	Title	Label	Other information
1997	Forget the World	Fueled by Ramen/Vagrant/Stiff Dog Records	First album. Last album with saxophonist Roman Flyscher and percussionist Brandon Bairian.
1999	Heads Are Gonna Roll	Interscope	Last album with drummer Kyle Briggs.
2003	The Hippos	Olympic Records	Final album.

=== Singles ===
Year	Song	Label	Other information
1999	"Wasting My Life"	Interscope	Out of print.

=== Non-album tracks ===
Year	Album title	Label	Song(s)	Notes
1996	California Ska-Quake, Vol. 2: The Aftershock	Caroline Records	"So What?"	Last recording made before Rich Zahniser joined the band.
1997	Take Warning: The Songs of Operation Ivy	Glue Factory Records	"Freeze Up"	Originally performed by Operation Ivy.
1997	Christmas Gone Wrong	Drive Thru Records	"Do They Know It's Christmas?"	Originally performed by Band Aid (band) - The Hippos along with Cousin Oliver were the studio band and Ariel and Louis were among several singers featured.
1998	Five Years on the Streets	Vagrant	"Lost It (Live)"	—N/a
1998	The Radiolistener Remixes	Vegas Records	"Asleep at the Wheel (The Boom Shaka remix)"	—N/a
1999	Before You Were Punk 2	Vagrant	"Our Lips Are Sealed"	Originally performed by The Go-Go's.
1999	No album	No label	"1999"	Outtake from "Heads Are Gonna Roll," available as a download from the band's official website.
1999	No album	No label	"You Got Me"	Theme song Season 1 of 100 Deeds for Eddie McDowd.
1999	No album	No label	"Shake It Up"	Appears in the pilot episode of Roswell and the film Love Wrecked.
2000	Just Not Punk Enough	Missing Words Records	"Man of the 90's"	Recorded in 1995, from the Spreading the Cheese demo.
2000	No album	No label	"The Aliens Are Here"	Appears in Scooby-Doo and the Alien Invaders.

=== Demos ===
Year	Title	Label	Other information
1995	Spreading the Cheese	Self-released	Contained "Bones Brigade," "Man of the '90s," "Rocky Ground," and "Blazin' Saddles." The re-recorded "Bones Brigade" is the secret track on "Forget the World."
1995	Attack of the Killer Cheese	Self-released	Contained "Get Away", "Asleep At The Wheel", "Rocky Ground", and "The Boss." "Asleep At The Wheel" was re-recorded for "Forget the World." "The Boss" served as the basis for "Celebrate" on that album as well, though it was pretty drastically re-written. Out of print.
1998	Heads Are Gonna Roll	Self-released	Demos for 1999 album including early versions of "Thinking," "Pollution," and a cover of "Gigantic" by the Pixies.
