= All That We Needed =

Studio album by Plain White T's
- Released: January 25, 2005
- Recorded: March 29, 2004 – April 21, 2004
- Studio: Hard Drive Studio; (North Hollywood, Los Angeles, California)
- Genre: Pop-punk; pop rock; power pop; emo
- Length: 40:14
- Label: Fearless
- Producer: Ariel Rechtshaid; Loren Israel

Plain White T's chronology
Stop (2003)	All That We Needed (2005)	Every Second Counts (2006)

Professional ratings
Review scores
Source	Rating
AbsolutePunk.net	(92%)
AllMusic	4/5 stars
PopMatters	7/10 stars

All That We Needed is the third studio album by American rock band Plain White T's, released on January 25, 2005. This is Plain White T's second album with Fearless Records. In July 2007, after the release of Every Second Counts (2006), the song "Hey There Delilah" was re-issued as a single and sold unexpectedly well, reaching number one on the US Billboard Hot 100. The album was certified gold by the Recording Industry Association of America (RIAA). It is the first album without Ken Fletcher and Steve Mast who were replaced by Tim Lopez and Mike Retondo and De'mar Hamilton as their new drummer.

== Commercial performance ==
All That We Needed missed the Billboard 200 chart, but still managed to appear on the US Heatseekers Albums chart. The album peaked at number 26 on the chart. On July 31, 2017, the album was certified gold by the Recording Industry Association of America (RIAA) for combined sales and album-equivalent units of over 500,000 units in the United States.

== Track listing ==
All tracks are written by Tom Higgenson, except where noted.

No.	Title	Writer(s)	Length
1.	"All That We Needed"	Higgenson, Shelly Peiken	3:41
2.	"Revenge"		3:26
3.	"Take Me Away"	Higgenson, Danny Wilde	2:42
4.	"My Only One"	Higgenson, Mike Retondo	3:49
5.	"Sad Story"		2:57
6.	"Breakdown"		3:34
7.	"What More Do You Want?"		2:24
8.	"Lazy Day Afternoon"		2:15
9.	"Anything"		2:59
10.	"Sing My Best"		2:51
11.	"Faster"		2:51
12.	"Last Call"		2:53
13.	"Hey There Delilah"		3:52
Total length:			40:14

== Personnel ==
- Tom Higgenson – lead vocals, acoustic guitar
- Tim G. Lopez – lead guitar, backing vocals
- Dave Tirio – rhythm guitar
- Mike Retondo – bass guitar, backing vocals
- De'Mar Hamilton – drums, percussion

== Charts ==
Chart performance for All That We Needed
Chart (2005)	Peak position
US Heatseekers Albums (Billboard)	26
US Independent Albums (Billboard)	31

== Certifications ==
Certifications for All That We Needed
Region	Certification	Certified units/sales
New Zealand (RMNZ)	Gold	7,500^{‡}
United States (RIAA)	Gold	500,000^{‡}
^{‡} Sales+streaming figures based on certification alone.
