= Falling for Robots & Wishing I Was One =

falling for robots & wishing i was one

Studio album by LØLØ
- Released: June 7, 2024
- Genres: Pop punk; pop rock; power pop; indie-pop
- Length: 39:33
- Label: Hopeless Records
- Producer: Mike Robinson

LØLØ chronology
u & the tin man (2024)	falling for robots & wishing i was one (2024)	god forbid a girl spits out her feelings! (2026)

Singles from falling for robots & wishing i was one
- 1. "omg" Released: May 12, 2023; 2. "hot girls in hell" Released: July 21, 2023; 3. "faceplant" Released: October 6, 2023; 4. "*snow in berlin*" Released: December 1, 2023; 5. "2 of us" Released: January 12, 2024; 6. "poser" Released: February 23, 2024; 7. "kill the girl" Released: May 2, 2024

falling for robots & wishing i was one is the debut studio album by Canadian singer-songwriter LØLØ, released on June 7, 2024, by Hopeless Records.

The album explores themes of heartbreak, emotional sensitivity, and the desire to become less affected by one's feelings. Its title refers to two complementary ideas: falling in love with people who appear emotionally detached, or wishing to become similarly detached oneself. LØLØ drew inspiration for the album's concept from The Wizard of Oz, particularly its Tin Man character, and structured the album around the tension between emotional vulnerability and the desire to feel nothing.

== Background and release ==
LØLØ began developing the album's concept around her experiences with relationships and emotional sensitivity after moving from Toronto to Los Angeles. She described the album's central idea as either “falling for robots”—people who seem to lack emotions—or “wishing I was one” because of the difficulty of feeling emotions so intensely.

The first song written for the album was "u & the tin man". Mandel wrote the song after comparing a former partner to the Tin Man from The Wizard of Oz, and later used the concept as the basis for the album's title and thematic direction. The album's final opening track, "intro", was among the last songs written and was intended to establish the emotional tone of the record.

The album incorporates material that LØLØ had released before its official release. "u turn me on (but u give me depression)" originally appeared on her 2022 EP debbie downer, released September 30, 2022. Seven other album tracks—"omg", "hot girls in hell", "faceplant", "*snow in berlin*", "2 of us", "poser", and "u & the tin man"—were collected on the seven-track EP u & the tin man, released April 4, 2024. "u & the tin man" was also released as a single on the same date and was accompanied by the announcement of the debut album.

== Music and themes ==
falling for robots & wishing i was one combines elements of pop punk, alternative rock, indie pop, and acoustic singer-songwriter music. Critics noted the contrast between its energetic guitar-driven songs and quieter acoustic material.

The album's lyrics center largely on romantic relationships, heartbreak, insecurity, anger, self-doubt, and emotional exhaustion. The recurring robot imagery represents emotional detachment and the desire to escape the vulnerability associated with being human. "wish i was a robot" develops the album's central metaphor most directly, while "u & the tin man" connects it to the Tin Man from The Wizard of Oz.

The sequencing was designed as an emotional arc. "intro" establishes the album's central feeling of exhaustion, while songs such as "omg", "faceplant", "2 of us", and "hot girls in hell" move between excitement, infatuation, anger, and heartbreak. The quieter tracks provide moments of reflection before the album concludes with "u & the tin man".

== Promotion ==
Following the release of the album, LØLØ toured in support of the record. She joined Jxdn's tour during summer 2024 before embarking on headline dates in the United Kingdom and Europe in October and November 2024, followed by a North American headline tour in February and March 2025.

The album's release was accompanied by music videos and visual material for its songs. "wish i was a robot" was released as a focus single on June 7, 2024, alongside a video.

== Track listing ==
All tracks are written by Lauren Mandel, except where noted.

No.	Title	Length	Writer(s)	Producer(s)
1.	"intro"	0:55	Lauren Mandel	Mike Robinson
2.	"omg"	2:34	Mandel, Robinson, Benjamin Thomas, Marisa Maino	Robinson
3.	"faceplant"	2:42	Mandel, Robinson, Maino	Robinson
4.	"2 of us"	2:46	Mandel, Robinson, Maino	Robinson
5.	"gloria"	3:49	Mandel, Robinson, Maino	Robinson
6.	"u turn me on (but u give me depression)"	2:27	Mandel, Geoff Warburton, Robinson	Robinson, Thomas, Giordan Postorino
7.	"wish i was a robot"	2:57	Mandel, Robinson, Andrew Haas, Ian Franzino	Robinson
8.	"hot girls in hell"	2:51	Mandel, Robinson, Maino	Robinson
9.	"*thoughts from the shower*"	2:42	Mandel	Robinson
10.	"poser"	2:49	Mandel, Robinson, David Arkwright	Robinson, Arkwright
11.	"*snow in berlin*"	2:39	Mandel	Robinson
12.	"kill the girl"	2:30	Mandel, Robinson, Warburton	Robinson
13.	"i would fix u if i could"	2:35	Mandel	Robinson
14.	"suck it up"	2:49	Mandel, Maino	Thomas, Postorino
15.	"u & the tin man"	2:28	Mandel	Robinson

== Deluxe edition ==
A deluxe edition, titled falling for robots & wishing i was one (deluxe), was released on February 7, 2025. It expanded the album from 15 to 20 tracks and added five previously unreleased or alternate recordings: "DON'T!", "possibility", "hot girls in hell (sad version)", "die without u (live version)", and "u & the tin man (demo)".

== Reception ==
Professional ratings
Review scores
Source	Rating
Kerrang!	4/5 stars
Distorted Sound	8/10 stars

falling for robots & wishing i was one received mixed reviews from critics. Kerrang! gave the album four out of five stars, describing it as a collection spanning alternative, indie, pop, pop-rock and pop-punk styles. Distorted Sound awarded it 8 out of 10, praising its mixture of acoustic and rock-oriented material and its progression across the track listing. Other reviews were more critical of the songwriting and production, while still noting the strength of individual songs and hooks.

Rock Sound ranked falling for robots & wishing i was one at number 24 on its list of the top 24 albums of 2024.

== Commercial performance ==
falling for robots & wishing i was one charted on several United Kingdom album charts. It reached its highest position on the UK Independent Album Breakers Chart, where it peaked at number 5.

Chart	Peak position
Scottish Albums Chart	86
UK Albums Sales Chart	72
UK Physical Albums Chart	68
UK Record Store Chart	23
UK Independent Albums Chart	24
UK Independent Album Breakers Chart	5

== Personnel ==
- LØLØ – vocals, songwriting
- Mike Robinson – production, songwriting, mixing
- Benjamin Thomas – production, songwriting
- Giordan Postorino – production, songwriting
- Marisa Maino – songwriting
- Geoff Warburton – songwriting
- David Arkwright – production, songwriting
- Andrew Haas – songwriting
- Ian Franzino – songwriting
