= Heavy Duty (music) =

Heavy Duty music production

- Company type: Private
- Industry: Music industry
- Founded: 2010
- Founder: Josh Kessler; Ariel Rechtshaid
- Headquarters: Los Angeles, United States
- Area served: Worldwide
- Key people: Josh Kessler; Ariel Rechtshaid; Kate Urcioli
- Services: Publishing; Music consulting; Supervision; Custom music
- Subsidiaries: Heavy Duty Music Publishing; Heavy Duty Projects
- Website: heavydutymusic.com

Heavy Duty is a music publishing and production house based in Los Angeles. It comprises Heavy Duty Music Publishing and Heavy Duty Projects.

== History ==
Heavy Duty Music Publishing was founded in 2010 by Grammy-winning record producer Ariel Rechtshaid, who has written and produced for artists including Vampire Weekend, Haim, Adele, and Usher, and music industry veteran Josh Kessler. Rechtshaid is the executive creative director, and Kessler is CEO. Their past and present roster includes Daniel Nigro, Cass McCombs, Miya Folick, Cherry Glazerr, Jim-E Stack, BJ Burton, Buddy Ross, Justin Raisen, Nightfeelings, Anthoine Walters, Gabe Goodman, and Whitmer Thomas. Their writers and producers have received credits on songs by Frank Ocean, Bon Iver, Miley Cyrus, Drake, Nicki Minaj, and Travis Scott. Jeremiah Raisen (pka Sadpony), signed to Heavy Duty Music, wrote and produced "Trollz" by 6ix9ine and Nicki Minaj, which reached number 1 on the Billboard Hot 100.

The music agency Heavy Duty Projects was established in 2015, with Kate Urcioli as partner and executive producer. They offer original composition, production, mixing, sound design, and music supervision, for television, films, video games, and commercials. Heavy Duty Projects has created original music for ad campaigns for brands including American Eagle, Bud Light, Chase, Apple, Google, Postmates, Nintendo, Marriott, Gatorade, Target, and Gillette.

In 2019, the company launched Heavy Duty Trailers, with Kevin Seaton as creative director. The division provides original and licensed music for feature film trailers and television series promos.

In 2023, Heavy Duty Projects had songs on the soundtrack album for The Muppets Mayhem, which reached number 1 on the Billboard Kid Albums chart, on the animated film Spider-Man: Across the Spider-Verse, and on the Netflix series Beef. Heavy Duty composer-producer Amanda Yamate scored the Netflix films Do Revenge and You Are So Not Invited to My Bat Mitzvah and the Netflix series Dream Academy.

== Divisions ==
Division	Formed	Description
Heavy Duty Music Publishing	2010	A music publishing company with a roster of songwriters, producers, and artists.
Heavy Duty Projects	2015	Offers music supervision, original compositions, artist collaborations, remixes, and post-production services such as sound design and mixing, with studios in Los Angeles, New York, and London.
Heavy Duty Trailers	2019	Provides original and licensed music for film trailers and television promos.

== Awards ==
At the 2022 AMP Awards for Music & Sound, Heavy Duty Projects won Best in Show for the spot Keep Walking; Best Use of Music in a Promo, Trailer or Title Sequence for Film, TV or Game for Shillin, created for the TV series Atlanta; and Outstanding Adaptation/Arrangement. Heavy Duty Projects won the 2024 AMP Award for Most Effective Use of Music in a Campaign, for the Etsy campaign Your Mission. They won a 2023 Guild of Music Supervisors Award for Best Music Supervision for a Video Game (Synch) for their work on Saints Row.
