= Sweater Collection =

EP by LØLØ
- Released: May 3, 2019
- Recorded: 2018
- Genre: Pop; alternative pop; indie pop; bubblegum pop
- Length: 21:56
- Label: Flying Colours Music, Inc.
- Producer: Lauren Mandel; Benjamin Thomas Nudds; Giordan Postorino; Colin Munroe; Derek Hoffman

LØLØ chronology
Sweater Collection (2019)	overkill (2021)

Singles from Sweater Collection
- 1. "Yours" Released: 2018; 2. "Convenient" Released: 2018; 3. "Sweater Collection" Released: March 8, 2019

Sweater Collection is the debut EP by LØLØ (stylized as "Lo Lo" at the time of release) released on May 3, 2019, by Flying Colours Music, Inc.

== Track listing ==
Sweater Collection track listing
No.	Title	Writer(s)	Length
1.	"Yours"	Lauren Mandel, Benjamin Thomas Nudds, Giordan Postorino, Seth Meyer	2:47
2.	"Stay Up"	Mandel, Nudds, Derik John Baker, Meyer	2:54
3.	"Convenient"	Mandel, Nudds, Postorino	2:58
4.	"Sweater Collection"	Mandel, David Charles Fischer, Derek Hoffman	3:03
5.	"Stranger's Interlude"	Mandel, Nudds, Postorino	0:36
6.	"Stranger's Arms" (featuring DCF)	Mandel, Fischer, Postorino, Nathan Ferraro, Shaya Motamed	3:14
7.	"Champagne 4every1"	Mandel, Nudds, Postorino, Ferraro, Meyer	3:06
8.	"Champagne Interlude"	Mandel, Nudds, Postorino	0:32
9.	"Convenient (Acoustic)"	Mandel, Nudds, Postorino	2:46
Total length:			21:56

== Charts ==
Chart performance for "Yours"
Song	Chart (2018)	Peak position
Yours	Canada Hot AC	27
Yours	Canada CHR/Top 40	33
