= Big Bad World =

Studio album by Plain White T's
- Released: September 23, 2008
- Recorded: Groovemaster Studios (Chicago)
- Genre: Pop punk, indie rock
- Length: 33:57
- Label: Hollywood, Fearless
- Producer: Johnny K

Plain White T's chronology
Every Second Counts (2006)	Big Bad World (2008)	Wonders of the Younger (2010)

Singles from Big Bad World
- 1. "Natural Disaster" Released: August 8, 2008; 2. "1, 2, 3, 4" Released: January 16, 2009

Big Bad World is the fifth studio album by American rock band Plain White T's. It was released on September 23, 2008, by Hollywood Records. The creation of this album was a follow-up album to Every Second Counts in hopes of breaking free from being the "Hey There Delilah" Band. To promote the album, the Plain White T's launched a few webisodes, which together form the series Meet Me in California. The majority of the album was written while on the road, in planes, in hotels, and on buses.

== Production ==
The producer of this album, Johnny K, and mixer Andy Wallace approached the recordings as if it were an old recording. Typically, a recording studio would "layer the guitars," by recording everyone separately. Instead, Tom Higgenson revealed his ultimate goal: that he would rather the band "reflect back onto The Beatles to 'bring that back- the real songs, the classic kind of feel.'" Both producers decided to let the "ambiance of the room fill out the recording rather than layer the performances." To produce this kind of sound, the album was recorded in one room with the P.A. monitors and wedges, and no headphones. They even decided to use live drum recordings, rather than fiddling with the artificial sounds of an electric set.

== Promotion ==
The clothing store Aéropostale started selling the album. Buying it from there includes a limited edition Plain White T's T-shirt; also trying on a pair of jeans there gets you a code to type on Aeropostale's website for a free song download titled "Love at 10th Sight". This was also done with the latest Fall Out Boy album to increase awareness of the Aero brand. The free download is no longer available due to it being limited until midnight of the album release.

The single "Natural Disaster" is featured as downloadable content for the Rock Band series.

- Natural Disaster
- Hey There Delilah
- Hate (I Really Don't Like You)
- Our Time Now
- Making Of 'Big Bad World'
- UK Tour Footage
- Making Of 'Natural Disaster'
- Rodders

== Critical reception ==
Professional ratings
Aggregate scores
Source	Rating
Metacritic	47/100
Review scores
Source	Rating
AllMusic	3.5/5 stars
Alternative Press	3/5 stars
The A.V. Club	D
Blender	3/5 stars
Entertainment Weekly	B
PopMatters	1/10
Q	2/5 stars
Sputnikmusic	1.5/5

The album received mixed reviews, with The Album Project giving the album a score of 2/5 and saying; "the new Plain White T's seem to be making music with the intention of not simply becoming a one hit wonder ("Hey There Delilah") and "making it big" but in the process have watered down everything." AbsolutePunk.net reviewer Chris Fallon gave the album a score of only 24%, saying "the band continues their steep decline by writing some of the cheesiest, most gimmicky songs even Kidz Bop wouldn't consider covering". AbsolutePunk later lampooned the record by claiming that album had sold 10 million copies, as their April Fool's Day joke of 2009.

However, the album also gained a positive reception from critics. AllMusic reviewer Andrew Leahey gave the album 3 and-a-half out of 5 stars, saying "the[y] [Plain White T's] never attempt to recreate the magic that fueled "Hey There Delilah," focusing instead on slick, sunny songcraft with nary an acoustic guitar in sight," calling it "a refreshingly smart release that emphasizes the band's pop/rock leanings" and that they "deserve points for remaining grounded after a meteoric year."

== Track listing ==
All songs written by Tom Higgenson except for when noted

Standard edition
No.	Title	Writer(s)	Length
1.	"Big Bad World"	Higgenson, Chris Tompkins	3:07
2.	"Natural Disaster"	Higgenson, Ian Kirkpatrick, Tim Lopez, Mike Retondo	3:40
3.	"Serious Mistake"		3:32
4.	"Rainy Day"	Higgenson, Tompkins	3:11
5.	"1, 2, 3, 4"		3:18
6.	"That Girl"		3:07
7.	"Sunlight"	Higgenson, Lopez, Reed Calhoun	3:50
8.	"I Really Want You"		2:58
9.	"Meet Me in California"	Higgenson, Tompkins	3:34
10.	"Someday"	Higgenson, Lopez, Evan Frankfort	3:40
Total length:			33:57

Bonus Track
No.	Title	Length
11.	"Love at 10th Sight" (UK/iTunes Bonus Track)	2:59
12.	"I Get Screwed" (iTunes Bonus Track)	3:02

== Personnel ==
Credits adapted from the album's liner notes.

Plain White T's

- Tom Higgenson – lead vocals, piano (6, 7, 8, 9, 10), harmonica (8)
- Tim Lopez – lead guitar, backing vocals, co-lead vocals (7, 10)
- Dave Tirio – rhythm guitar
- Mike Retondo – bass guitar, bass clarinet (3), melodica (3), coronet (3), saxophone (1), backing vocals
- De'Mar Hamilton – drums, percussion

Additional musicians

- Johnny K – slide guitar (9), mellotron (7)
- William Hamilton – organ (7)
- Matt Harris – screamed vocals (6)
- Eric Remschneider – strings (3, 4, 10)
- Ian Kirkpatrick – horn arrangements (1, 3)
- Jon Brion – Chamberlin (5)

Production

- Justin Wilk – assistant engineering, digital editing
- Daniel Salcido – 2nd assistant engineer
- Andy Wallace – mixing
- John O'Mahony – mix engineer
- Jan Petrov – mix assistant
- Ted Jensen – mastering

Artwork

- David Snow – creative direction
- Enny Joo – art direction and design
- Jesse Frohman – photography

== Charts ==
Chart performance
Chart (2008)	Peak position
US Billboard 200	33
US Top Alternative Albums (Billboard)	10
US Top Rock Albums (Billboard)	14
