= Wonders of the Younger =

Studio album by Plain White T's
- Released: December 7, 2010
- Genres: Alternative rock, indie rock, emo pop
- Length: 49:45
- Label: Hollywood
- Producer: Ian Kirkpatrick

Plain White T's chronology
| Big Bad World (2008) | Wonders of the Younger (2010) | Should've Gone to Bed (2013) |

Singles from Wonders of the Younger
- 1. "Rhythm of Love" Released: October 3, 2010; 2. "Boomerang" Released: April 5, 2011

Wonders of the Younger is the sixth studio album by American rock band Plain White T's. It was released by Hollywood Records on December 7, 2010, and was produced by Ian Kirkpatrick. The collection of the songs was designed to evoke the feeling of awe and the yearning for adventure remembered from youth. On September 9, the album art was revealed on the band's official MySpace account. On September 13, the album finished up with mastering engineer Brian "Big Bass" Gardner at Bernie Grundman Mastering in Hollywood.

== Background ==
Frontman Tom Higgenson says of the album, "It's still very much a Plain White T's album. The songs are sincere and melodic, no matter what the subject matter. We want to create an experience that takes our fans to an unexpected place while still giving them songs to sing along to." In an interview with the Chicago Tribune, Higgenson said that: "The name of the album is 'The Wonders of the Younger.' We were in Vegas last year around Valentine's Day and saw the Cirque du Soleil show 'O.' The show had clowns, pirates and a bunch of crazy stuff and I walked out thinking 'I've got a great idea for our next album.' From that point on, my mind went wild."

In regards to Wonders of the Younger: "The scope is a lot bigger than anything we've done before," Higgenson says. "We definitely tried to get out of our comfort zone. Not that we wanted to sound like a different band. But we wanted to push ourselves outside of what the Plain White T's are accustomed to--exploring different arrangements and striving to be more adventurous and exciting lyrically, musically and thematically. It all has to give you that epic feeling that we wanted the album to have. Even the performances that we're doing and the video we made has to have that slightly surreal, slightly fantastic kind of vibe to it." Higgenson built and decorated the recording studio in the basement of his Chicago home with Wonders of the Younger as his thematic inspiration.

The album gets off to a faster start with "Irrational Anthem," a sort of thematic overture for the record. "Lyrically," says Higgenson, "I think it says exactly what I want the album to say. I think the line that sums up the whole album is Let your mind go anywhere it wants to. Don't lose your imagination. Don't get so wrapped up in your day-to-day life that you forget to dream or be creative, or forget to recapture those things or at least remember them. That's the beauty of life. I'm a very nostalgic guy, so a lot of where my head lives is in memories. I spend a lot of my time looking back and smiling at past things that have happened in my life."

== Singles ==
"Rhythm of Love" is the first single from Plain White T's' upcoming studio album. Higgenson noted that the song is all about pushing the boundaries of their creativity and musical imagination combined with a dose of nostalgia. On this single, the lead singer Tom Higgenson was on harmony vocals only, with guitarist Tim Lopez taking the lead vocal duties.

Tom Higgenson said during a live chat on Stickam that the second single off Wonders of The Younger would be "Boomerang".

== Critical reception ==
Professional ratings
Aggregate scores
| Source | Rating |
|---|---|
| Metacritic | 57/100 |
Review scores
| Source | Rating |
| AbsolutePunk | (55%) |
| AllMusic | 3.5/5 stars |
| Entertainment Weekly | C+ |
| Rock Sound | 6/10 |
| Slant Magazine | 2/5 stars |

Wonders of the Younger received generally mixed reviews from music critics. At Metacritic, which assigns a normalized rating out of 100 to reviews from mainstream critics, the album received an average score of 57, based on 8 reviews, which indicates "mixed or average reviews". Andrew Leahey of AllMusic praised them for experimenting on different styles of instruments and vocals, and not relying exclusively on the midtempo songwriting that made them famous saying "As far as pop albums go, this one strikes a rare balance between familiarity and novelty". Amy Bangs of Rock Sound gave note that the band stuck with their sound as a response to the detractors. She concluded by saying "For the rest of us, there's no denying that 'Rhythm Of Love' and 'Killer' are guilty pleasures in the making – consider us thoroughly killed with kindness." Jon Dolan of Entertainment Weekly gave credit to Tom Higgenson for sticking with his priorities but found the album a bit dreary.

== Track listing ==
International edition
| No. | Title | Writer(s) | Length |
|---|---|---|---|
| 1. | "Irrational Anthem" | Tom Higgenson, Adam Watts, Andy Dodd | 3:37 |
| 2. | "Boomerang" | Higgenson, Jeremy Smith | 2:57 |
| 3. | "Welcome to Mystery" | Higgenson, Chris Tompkins | 4:27 |
| 4. | "Rhythm of Love" | Tim Lopez | 3:20 |
| 5. | "Map of the World" | Higgenson, John Feldmann | 3:39 |
| 6. | "Killer" | Higgenson, Marty Dodson | 2:38 |
| 7. | "Last Breath" | Higgenson, Feldmann | 3:46 |
| 8. | "Broken Record" | Higgenson, Zac Malloy, Tompkins | 3:31 |
| 9. | "Our Song" | Higgenson, Shakur Green | 3:15 |
| 10. | "Airplane" | Higgenson, Mike Retondo | 2:18 |
| 11. | "Cirque Dans La Rue" | Higgenson, Marty Dodson | 3:57 |
| 12. | "Body Parts" | Lopez | 3:35 |
| 13. | "Make It Up as You Go" | Higgenson, Dave Tirio | 3:44 |
| 14. | "Wonders of the Younger" | Higgenson, Sean McConnell | 5:08 |
| 15. | "Thanks for Nothing (Bonus)" | | 3:01 |
| 16. | "Hollywood Love (Bonus)" | | 3:42 |

United Kingdom bonus tracks
| No. | Title | Writer(s) | Length |
|---|---|---|---|
| 15. | "1, 2, 3, 4" | Higgenson | 3:18 |

== Personnel ==
Adapted from the Wonders of the Younger liner notes.

Plain White T's

- Tom Higgenson – vocals (lead on all tracks except 4 and 12), guitar, keyboards, celeste, percussion
- De'Mar Hamilton – drums, percussion, vocals
- Dave Tirio – guitar, vocals
- Tim G. Lopez – guitar, lead vocals on tracks 4 and 12, keyboards
- Mike Retondo – bass, vocals, keyboards, celeste, accordion, horns, woodwinds

Additional musicians

- Dan Monahan – celeste, guitar, accordion, bouzouki, drum programming
- Augie Schmidt – keyboards, synths, drum programming, strings, horns
- Nick Rucker – additional instrumentation on "Rhythm of Love"
- Jeremy Smith – piano on "Boomerang"
- Mike Daly – pedal steel on "Killer"
- Matt Rohde – piano on "Killer" and "Make It Up As You Go", B3 organ on "Make It Up As You Go"

Production

- Joe Zook – mixing
- Dan Piscina – assistant mixing
- Brian Gardner – mastering
- Nick Rucker – additional production on "Rhythm of Love"
- Dan Monahan, Augie Schmidt – additional production on "Irrational Anthem", "Our Song", "Cirque Dans La Rue" and "Make It Up As You Go"
- John Feldmann – additional production on "Map of the World" and "Last Breath"

Artwork

- Enny Joo – art direction and design
- Cliff Cramp – illustration
- Joseph Cultice – photography
- Plain White T's, Mike Venezia – cover concept

== Charts ==
Chart performance
| Chart (2010) | Peak position |
|---|---|
| UK Album Downloads (Official Charts) | 81 |
| US Billboard 200 | 149 |
| US Top Alternative Albums (Billboard) | 15 |
| US Top Rock Albums (Billboard) | 23 |
