= That Lying Bitch =

American punk rock band

- Origin: Chicago, Illinois, United States
- Genre: Punk rock
- Years active: 2013–present
- Label: Humans Were Here
- Members: Darren Vorel; Tom Higgenson; Dave Tirio; Eric Vorel

That Lying Bitch is an American punk rock band. Formed in 2013 by high school friends Tom Higgenson, Darren Vorel, Dave Tirio, and Eric Vorel. That Lying Bitch came together when singer/guitar player Darren Vorel was broken up with by girlfriend and former bandmate in his previous group, The Scissors. Band members Tom Higgenson and Dave Tirio are also the lead singer and guitarist (respectively) of popular American band Plain White T's.

That Lying Bitch released their self-titled debut album in 2018 and have since released four singles, "Good Times", "Be Mine or I'll Flatline", "You Killed Me", and "I Don't Wanna Think About It I Just Wanna Drink About It". on Higgenson's record label Humans Were Here.

== Band members ==
- Darren Vorel – lead vocals, guitar (2013–present)
- Eric Vorel – guitar, backing vocals (2013–present)
- Dave Tirio – bass, backing vocals (2013–present)
- Tom Higgenson – drums (2013–present)
