= God Forbid a Girl Spits Out Her Feelings! =

god forbid a girl spits out her feelings!

Studio album by LØLØ
- Released: April 17, 2026
- Genre: Pop rock
- Length: 37:01
- Label: Fearless
- Producers: Mike Robinson, Andrew Goldstein, Danen Reed Rector, Giordan Postorino, Gus van Go

LØLØ chronology
falling for robots & wishing i was one (2024)	god forbid a girl spits out her feelings! (2026)

Singles from god forbid a girl spits out her feelings!
- 1. "the devil wears converse" Released: July 25, 2025; 2. "american zombie" Released: September 5, 2025; 3. "me with no shirt on" Released: November 7, 2025; 4. "007" Released: January 16, 2026; 5. "the punisher" Released: February 27, 2026

god forbid a girl spits out her feelings! is the second studio album by Canadian singer-songwriter LØLØ. It was released on April 17, 2026, by Fearless Records, and is the follow-up to her 2024 debut studio album, falling for robots & wishing i was one.

The album explores emotional vulnerability, romantic obsession, heartbreak, self-doubt and the contradictions of knowing that a relationship may be unhealthy while continuing to pursue it. It represents a thematic reversal of LØLØ's debut, which centered on the desire to suppress emotions and become emotionally detached. On the second album, she instead embraces emotional sensitivity and the act of openly expressing her feelings.

== Background and release ==
Following the release and touring cycle of falling for robots & wishing i was one, LØLØ began developing material for a second album that would approach its predecessor's themes from the opposite perspective. While the debut explored the wish to become emotionally numb, she wanted the new album to embrace the experience of feeling things deeply and expressing those emotions without restraint.

The album's title came from LØLØ's concerns about how women are perceived when they openly express their emotions. She described the phrase as sarcastic while also reflecting the criticism she had received for writing openly about romantic relationships and breakups. The title became a central statement for the album's emphasis on emotional honesty and vulnerability.

LØLØ wrote the album with a number of collaborators, including Mike Robinson, Andrew Goldstein, David Charles Fischer, David Arkwright, Caroline Romano, Spencer Jordan, Brian Logan Dales, Taylor Acorn, Danen Reed Rector, Giordan Postorino, Braden Bales and Gus McMillan. Robinson and Goldstein produced multiple tracks, while additional production was provided by Rector, Postorino and Gus van Go.

== Music and themes ==
god forbid a girl spits out her feelings! has been described as a pop-rock and pop-punk album, with elements of alternative rock and acoustic singer-songwriter music.

The album is characterized by diaristic songwriting and a mixture of humor, sarcasm and emotional vulnerability. Its songs frequently examine romantic fixation, toxic relationships, self-deprecation and the tendency to repeat unhealthy patterns despite recognizing them.

The opening title track establishes the album's central idea of openly expressing feelings rather than suppressing them. "the dumbest girl in the world" uses self-deprecation to examine repeated romantic mistakes, while "me with no shirt on" focuses on the insecurity associated with losing another person's attention. "the punisher" addresses the compulsive behavior of monitoring an ex-partner online after a breakup.

Several songs use humor and exaggeration to address similar themes. "007" incorporates spy-film imagery into a song about attraction and suspicion, while "american zombie" uses a zombie metaphor to describe being drawn to an emotionally damaged person. The album closes with "lobotomy & u", which returns to the desire to escape the emotional consequences of a relationship.

== Promotion ==
The album's promotional campaign began with "the devil wears converse", released July 25, 2025, alongside LØLØ's announcement that she had signed with Fearless Records. The song was described by LØLØ as being about the temptation of falling for someone she knows is bad for her.

"american zombie" was released September 5, 2025, followed by "me with no shirt on" on November 7. Both songs were accompanied by music videos.

"007" was released January 16, 2026, alongside the announcement of the album. "the punisher" was released February 27, 2026, as the final pre-release single. “the punisher” was LØLØ’s first radio single, as it’s gotten radio play on several Canadian stations and peaked at No. 17 on Billboard Canada’s CHR Airplay chart.

== Track listing ==
All tracks are written by Lauren Mandel, except where noted.

No.	Title	Length	Writer(s)	Producer(s)
1.	"god forbid a girl spits out her feelings!"	2:50	Lauren Mandel	Mike Robinson
2.	"me with no shirt on"	2:48	Mandel, Andrew Goldstein, David Charles Fischer	Goldstein
3.	"the dumbest girl in the world"	2:22	Mandel, Robinson, David Arkwright	Robinson
4.	"hung up on u"	2:44	Mandel, Goldstein, Fischer	Goldstein
5.	"delusional darling"	3:10	Mandel, Robinson, Caroline Romano	Robinson
6.	"the punisher"	3:09	Mandel, Goldstein, Fischer	Goldstein
7.	"007"	2:50	Mandel, Danen Reed Rector, Brian Logan Dales, Taylor Acorn	Rector
8.	"the devil wears converse"	2:39	Mandel, Robinson, Spencer Jordan	Robinson
9.	"stuff like that"	3:16	Mandel	Giordan Postorino
10.	"whiskey & coke"	2:58	Mandel, Robinson, Braden Bales	Robinson
11.	"american zombie"	2:33	Mandel, Robinson, Jordan	Robinson
12.	"boy who doesn’t want to"	3:13	Mandel, Gus McMillan	Gus van Go
13.	"lobotomy & u"	2:29	Mandel, Robinson, Jordan	Robinson

== Reception ==
Professional ratings
Review scores
Source	Rating
Frontstage Magazine	8.3/10 stars
Kerrang!	4/5 stars
Out of Rage	10/10 stars
The Spill Magazine	9/10 stars

god forbid a girl spits out her feelings! received generally positive reviews from critics. Kerrang! awarded the album four out of five stars, praising its diaristic songwriting, catchy choruses and combination of vulnerability, humor and pop-rock songwriting. The Spill Magazine gave the album 9 out of 10, emphasizing its emotional intimacy and its depiction of unreciprocated feelings and romantic uncertainty. Out of Rage awarded it 10 out of 10, praising its emotional specificity, pop-rock sound and self-aware approach to heartbreak.

Frontstage Magazine gave the album an 8.3 out of 10, praising its combination of pop appeal and emotional openness and describing it as a development from LØLØ's debut.

Several reviewers highlighted the album's diaristic quality and its treatment of emotional oversharing. When The Horn Blows described it as a more emotionally exposed counterpart to LØLØ's debut, noting that the album treats emotional oversharing as a source of strength while also observing that its consistent tone can cause some tracks to blur together. Melodic Magazine praised the balance between sarcasm and sincerity and highlighted "hung up on u", "me with no shirt on" and "the dumbest girl in the world" as standout tracks.

HEAVY Magazine described the album as more intimate, immediate and stripped-back than its predecessor, with heartbreak serving as a central element of its lyrical narrative. MoreCore gave the album 6 out of 10, similarly noting its more vulnerable and subdued approach compared with the debut while praising LØLØ's humor, direct lyrics and emotional perspective.

== Commercial performance ==
The album reached number 80 on the UK Album Downloads Chart and number 32 on the UK Record Store Chart.

Chart	Peak position
UK Album Downloads Chart	80
UK Record Store Chart	32

== Personnel ==
- LØLØ – vocals
- Mike Robinson – production, programming, recording, songwriting
- Andrew Goldstein – production, programming, recording, background vocals, songwriting
- Danen Reed Rector – production, programming, recording, songwriting
- Giordan Postorino – production, programming, recording, mixing, songwriting
- Gus van Go – production, recording, mixing, songwriting
- Alex Ghenea – mixing
- Matt Huber – mixing
- Chris Gehringer – mastering
