= Heads Are Gonna Roll =

Studio album by The Hippos
- Released: August 24, 1999
- Recorded: 1998
- Genres: Ska; ska punk; pop rock; power pop
- Length: 39:31
- Label: Interscope
- Producers: Mark Trombino, Chris Fudurich, Ariel Rechtshaid, Rich Zahniser

The Hippos chronology
Forget the World (1997)	Heads Are Gonna Roll (1999)	The Hippos (2003)

Professional ratings
Review scores
Source	Rating
Allmusic	3/5 stars

Heads Are Gonna Roll is the second album by the Los Angeles, California ska band The Hippos, released in 1999 by Interscope Records. It was the band's first album for a major record label and was their most successful, with the single "Wasting My Life" receiving some airplay on rock radio stations in the United States. Musically the album found the band transitioning from the ska-based structure of their debut album to a more pop-rock sound, using fewer ska rhythms and instead incorporating synthesizers. It includes a new version of the song "Far Behind" from their debut album Forget the World. The album's art is a reference to The Animals' self-titled album.

Heads Are Gonna Roll was The Hippos' last proper album as a committed band. Although they would continue to perform and record over the next few years, they did not release any other albums until the posthumous The Hippos in 2003, after quietly disbanding.

== Track listing ==
All tracks are written by Ariel Rechtshaid, except where noted.

No.	Title	Length
1.	"Lost It"	2:24
2.	"Wasting My Life"	2:39
3.	"Struggling"	3:03
4.	"Pollution"	3:26
5.	"Thinking"	2:41
6.	"Something"	2:08
7.	"Always Something There to Remind Me" (originally performed by Lou Johnson) (Burt Bacharach, Hal David)	3:38
8.	"Better Watch Your Back"	2:33
9.	"The Sand"	2:46
10.	"Paulina"	3:08
11.	"Far Behind" (Louis Castle, Rechtshaid, Rich Zahniser)	3:28
12.	"All Alone" (Castle, Rechtshaid)	3:05
13.	"He Said"	3:55
14.	"Paulina (Reprise)"	0:37
Total length:		39:31

== Performers ==
- Ariel Rechtshaid - vocals, guitar, synthesizer
- James Bairian - bass
- Louis Castle - trumpet, backing vocals
- Rich Zahniser - trombone, Moog synthesizer, Farfisa organ, keyboards
- Danny Rukasin - trombone
- Kyle Briggs - drums, percussion

== Album information ==
- Record label: Interscope Records
- Produced by and engineered by Mark Trombino except "Always Something There to Remind Me" produced by Chris Fudurich, Ariel Rechtshaid, and Rich Zahniser and engineered by Chris Fudurich
- Additional engineers: Jordan D'Aleffio, Dale Lawton, Robert Read, Billy Bowers, Brian Foxworthy, and Nick Raskaulincez
- Recorded at Mad Hatter in Silver Lake, California, Sound City in Van Nuys, California, The Music Box in Hollywood, California, The Complex in west Los Angeles, California, and Chateau Chaumont in Hollywood, California
- Mixed by Phil Nicolo at Studio 4 in Conshohocken, Pennsylvania
- Mix engineer: Dirk Grobelny
- Mastered by Stephen Marcussen at A&M Mastering Studios in Hollywood, California
- Digitally edited by Andrew Garver
- All songs written by Ariel Rechtshaid except "All Alone" by Louis Castle and Ariel Rechtshaid, "Far Behind" by Rich Zahniser, Louis Castle, and Ariel Rechtshaid, and "Always Something There to Remind Me" by Hal David and Burt Bacharach
- Photos by Rocky Schenck
- Art direction and design by Francesca Restrepo

== Charts ==
Chart performance for Heads Are Gonna Roll
Chart (2000)	Peak position
Australian Albums (ARIA)	163
