= Forget the World (The Hippos album) =

Studio album by The Hippos
- Released: March 10, 1998
- Genres: Ska, ska punk, pop rock
- Length: 72:00
- Labels: Vagrant, Fueled by Ramen

The Hippos chronology
Forget the World (1998)	Heads Are Gonna Roll (1999)

Professional ratings
Review scores
Source	Rating
Allmusic	3/5 stars

Forget the World is the 1997 debut album of The Hippos, jointly released by Stiff Dog Records and Fueled by Ramen Records originally, with Vagrant Records later replacing the former. The band was offered the chance to record the album based on the song of the same name, which became the album's title track. A track from the album, Irie, was used on the soundtrack of the movie The Extreme Adventures of Super Dave, which was released straight to video in January 2000.

== Track listing ==
No.	Title	Writer(s)	Length
1.	"Far Behind"	Louis Castle, Ariel Rechtshaid, Rich Zahniser	3:22
2.	"Please"	Castle, Rechtshaid, Zahniser	3:27
3.	"When Will I Learn"	Castle, Rechtshaid, Zahniser	2:10
4.	"Diane"	Castle, Rechtshaid, Zahniser	2:19
5.	"Don't Worry"	Castle, Rechtshaid, Zahniser	3:19
6.	"Celebrate"	Castle, Rechtshaid, Zahniser	2:45
7.	"Irie"	Castle, Rechtshaid, Zahniser	3:19
8.	"Asleep at the Wheel"	Castle, Rechtshaid, Zahniser	2:51
9.	"So Lonely" (Originally performed by The Police)	Sting	3:44
10.	"Rock 'n' Roll"	Castle, Rechtshaid, Zahniser	2:13
11.	"Forget the World" (Contains hidden track "Bones Brigade")	Castle, Rechtshaid, Zahniser	42:26
Total length:			72:00
