= 1, 2, 3, 4 (Plain White T's song) =

2008 single by Plain White T's

Single by Plain White T's

from the album Big Bad World
- Released: December 2008
- Recorded: 2008
- Genre: Folk rock
- Length: 3:18
- Label: Hollywood
- Songwriter: Tom Higgenson
- Producer: Johnny K

Plain White T's singles chronology
"Natural Disaster" (2008)	"1, 2, 3, 4" (2008)	"Rhythm of Love" (2010)

Music video
- "1, 2, 3, 4" on YouTube

"1, 2, 3, 4" (sometimes subtitled "I Love You") is the second single from the Plain White T's second worldwide album, Big Bad World. It reached #34 on the U.S. Billboard Hot 100 in April 2009 and was certified Platinum in June 2011, having sold over 1 million digital copies. The record has since gone 2× Platinum.

== Chart performance ==
Since its release in December 2008, the song has been compared to the band's earlier hit "Hey There Delilah" because of its acoustic rock sound. In February 2009, "1, 2, 3, 4" began to climb on the U.S. Billboard Hot 100 chart, reaching a peak of No. 34, becoming their biggest hit on the chart after "Hey There Delilah".

On the Adult Top 40 chart, the song spent 26 weeks on the chart and peaked at No. 5.

== Music video ==
The music video for the song premiered on the MySpace main page January 16, 2009 and was subsequently released on MTV, MTVU, VH1, Fuse, Music Choice and YouTube. It found success on the weekly VH1 Top 20 Video Countdown, charting over five months straight between January and May, peaking at #5. It was listed on the VH1 Top 40 Videos of 2009 at #31.

Directed by Mike Venezia, the video depicts vocalist Tom Higgenson in 18-degree weather around Chicago on December 28, 2008, as he busks with acoustic guitar for passing couples — captions identify each couple, along with tidbits about how and when they met, or what they were up to that time.

Due to its low budget viral nature and success, the making of the video was reported on by CNN News, Chicago Sun Times, WGN News and The Bonnie Hunt Show. Additionally, a feature was added online allowing viewers to personalize the video by incorporating their own pictures.

== Charts ==
=== Weekly charts ===
Weekly chart performance
Chart (2009)	Peak position
Austria (Ö3 Austria Top 40)	22
Germany (GfK)	27
US Billboard Hot 100	34
US Adult Contemporary (Billboard)	10
US Adult Pop Airplay (Billboard)	5
US Pop Airplay (Billboard)	32

=== Year-end charts ===
Annual chart rankings
Chart (2009)	Position
US Adult Contemporary (Billboard)	19
US Adult Top 40 (Billboard)	26
US Digital Song Saless (Billboard)	70

== Certification ==
Region	Certification	Certified units/sales
United States (RIAA)	2× Platinum	2,000,000^{‡}
^{‡} Sales+streaming figures based on certification alone.

== Release history ==
Release dates and formats for "1, 2, 3, 4"
Region	Date	Format	Label(s)	Ref.
United States	March 17, 2009	Mainstream airplay	Hollywood	
