= A Whole New Sound =

Compilation album by Various artists
- Released: September 6, 2024
- Studio: Various
- Genre: Pop-punk
- Length: 34:00
- Label: Walt Disney

Singles from A Whole New Sound
- 1. "Can You Feel the Love Tonight" Released: July 12, 2024; 2. "I2I" Released: July 26, 2024; 3. "Part of Your World" Released: August 15, 2024

A Whole New Sound is a compilation album produced and released by Walt Disney Records, consisting of twelve Disney songs covered by alternative rock and pop punk artists. The album was digitally released on September 6, 2024, and on vinyl formats on October 4.

Simple Plan's cover of Elton John's "Can You Feel the Love Tonight" was the first single from the album released to coincide with the 30th anniversary of The Lion King.

== Track listing ==
No.	Title	Writer(s)	Artist	Length
1.	"Part of Your World" (from The Little Mermaid)	Alan Menken, Howard Ashman	New Found Glory	2:58
2.	"Remember Me" (from Coco)	Kristen Anderson-Lopez, Robert Lopez	Mayday Parade	2:46
3.	"Can You Feel the Love Tonight" (from The Lion King)	Elton John, Tim Rice	Simple Plan	2:53
4.	"I2I" (from A Goofy Movie)	Patrick DeRemer, Roy Freeland	Magnolia Park	3:00
5.	"A Whole New World" (from Aladdin)	Menken, Rice	Yellowcard & Chrissy Costanza	2:21
6.	"Go the Distance" (from Hercules)	Menken, David Zippel	We the Kings	3:08
7.	"Surface Pressure" (from Encanto)	Lin-Manuel Miranda	Plain White T’s	2:50
8.	"You've Got a Friend in Me" (from Toy Story)	Randy Newman	Meet Me @ The Altar	1:52
9.	"You'll Be in My Heart" (from Tarzan)	Phil Collins	Boys Like Girls	3:54
10.	"Colors of the Wind" (from Pocahontas)	Menken, Stephen Schwartz	Tokio Hotel	3:10
11.	"Let It Go" (from Frozen)	Anderson-Lopez, Lopez	LØLØ	3:25
12.	"Friend Like Me" (from Aladdin)	Menken, Ashman	Bowling for Soup	2:31
Total length:				34:00

== Charts ==
Chart performance for A Whole New Sound
Chart (2024)	Peak position
UK Album Downloads (OCC)	12
UK Compilation Albums (OCC)	16
US Billboard 200	195
US Kid Albums (Billboard)	1

== See also ==
- Nightmare Revisited
- Muppets: The Green Album
