= Rhythm of Love (Plain White T's song) =

2010 single by Plain White T's

Single by Plain White T's

from the album Wonders of the Younger
- Released: October 3, 2010
- Recorded: 2010
- Genre: Reggae; soft rock; pop rock
- Length: 3:21 (single version); 3:08 (radio edit)
- Label: Hollywood
- Songwriter: Tim Lopez
- Producers: Ian Kirkpatrick; Nick Rucker

Plain White T's singles chronology
"1, 2, 3, 4" (2008)	"Rhythm of Love" (2010)	"Boomerang" (2011)

Music video
- ”Rhythm of Love” on YouTube

"Rhythm of Love" is a song by American rock band Plain White T's. It is the first single from their sixth studio album Wonders of the Younger. The song debuted at number 96 on the Billboard Hot 100 and peaked at number 38. The song was featured in a fall 2010 promo for the season two premiere of Parenthood on NBC, and also during the closing credits of the 2011 film No Strings Attached. As of April 2011, the single has sold over one million copies.

The song is the only single released by the band to feature lead guitarist Tim Lopez on lead vocals.

== Music video ==
The music video was directed by Mike Venezia who also helmed the band's previous hit video for "1,2,3,4". Premiering August 14, 2010 on VH1, it was subsequently voted to the VH1 Top 20 Countdown fourteen weeks in a row, peaking at #6. The music video was also ranked one of the top seven clips of the year by tween magazine J-14, and accrued over 8 million hits on YouTube.

Filmed at Point Mugu, California, the video follows singer Tim Lopez as he walks and sings his way through a beach party along the edge of the shore. Band performance also occurs in front of a circus themed red and white striped wall, surrounded by dancers. The wall was later recreated as an illustration for the album cover of Wonders of the Younger, and physically re-constructed as a backdrop for official live tour performances.

On January 22, 2011, the "Rhythm of Love" music video was re-released in 3D by PassmoreLab and added to the official Mitsubishi 3D reel in over 11,000 retail locations, and made available for distribution worldwide.

== Chart performance ==
"Rhythm of Love" debuted at number 96 on the Billboard Hot 100 on the week of August 28, 2010 before falling off the next week. It re-charted at number 99 on the week of September 28, 2010 before falling off again two weeks later. On the week of October 23, 2010, the song re-charted again at number 89 and continually climbed up until the week of February 19, 2011 where it made its final appearance by peaking at number 38, their third Top 40 hit on that chart to date.

=== Weekly charts ===
Chart (2010–11)	Peak position
Australia (ARIA)	85
Canada Hot 100 (Billboard)	98
Scottish Singles Sales (Official Charts)	57
UK Singles (Official Charts)	60
US Billboard Hot 100	38
US Pop Airplay (Billboard)	20
US Adult Pop Airplay (Billboard)	5
US Adult Contemporary (Billboard)	4

=== Year-end charts ===
Chart (2010)	Position
US Adult Top 40 (Billboard)	48
Chart (2011)	Position
US Adult Contemporary (Billboard)	8
US Adult Top 40 (Billboard)	27

== Certifications ==
Region	Certification	Certified units/sales
New Zealand (RMNZ)	Gold	7,500^{*}
United States (RIAA)	Platinum	1,000,000^{*}
^{*} Sales figures based on certification alone.

== Release history ==
Release dates and formats for "Rhythm of Love"
Region	Date	Format	Label(s)	Ref.
United States	October 19, 2010	Mainstream airplay	Hollywood	
