= Natural Disaster (Plain White T's song) =

Single by Plain White T's

from the album Big Bad World
- Released: August 8, 2008
- Recorded: 2008
- Genre: Pop rock
- Length: 3:40
- Label: Hollywood
- Songwriters: Tom Higgenson; Tim Lopez; Mike Retondo; Ian Kirkpatrick
- Producer: Johnny K

Plain White T's singles chronology
"Our Time Now" (2007)	"Natural Disaster" (2008)	"1, 2, 3, 4" (2008)

"Natural Disaster" is the first single from the Plain White T's fifth studio album Big Bad World. It was released to pop radio on August 8, 2008, and peaked at No. 25 on the Billboard Bubbling Under Hot 100 Singles chart and No. 38 on the U.S. Billboard Modern Rock Tracks chart.

== Music video ==
The music video for the song became available in August 2008 and was released in many music channels, such as MTV and VH1. It begins with the famous line "Frankly, my dear, I don't give a damn" as the camera pans the Plain White T's. The video shows the band playing on a club and each member of the band is seduced by a beautiful model. One of the girls seducing Tom Higgenson is Tiffany Dupont, who was known for playing Frannie Morgan on ABC Family TV series Greek in seasons 1 & 2, which the band has many affiliations with. The song is available for download as a playable track in Rock Band and Rock Band 2.

== Charts ==
Chart (2008)	Peak position
U.S. Billboard Bubbling Under Hot 100 Singles	25
U.S. Billboard Modern Rock Tracks	38
