= Our Time Now =

Single by Plain White T's

from the album Every Second Counts
- Released: November 6, 2007
- Recorded: 2006
- Genre: Pop punk
- Length: 2:50
- Label: Hollywood, Fearless
- Songwriters: Tom Higgenson, Mia Post, Mike Daly
- Producer: Johnny K

Plain White T's singles chronology
"Hey There Delilah" (2007)	"Our Time Now" (2007)	"Natural Disaster" (2008)

"Our Time Now" is the third single from the Plain White T's from their album Every Second Counts. It was shipped to Pop Radio on November 6, 2007. It peaked at number 90 on the Billboard Hot 100 and number 29 on US Modern Rock charts.

The song was featured during a montage of people getting approved to go to Hollywood during American Idol on January 29, 2008. The promo caused the song to jump 20 spots on iTunes from 75 to 55 overnight.

"Our Time Now" was written by Tom Higgenson, Mia Post (Mia Koo) and Michael Daly and produced by Johnny K.

The band performed the song on the Nickelodeon sitcom iCarly in the Season 1 episode "iRue the Day."

== Music video ==
The music video was inspired by the film The Graduate. It stars the band performing the song on a theater stage with a crew working around them. A family appears at the start of the second verse having an outdoor party with a pool. The ending shows Tom stopping a wedding and running off with the bride.

== Charts ==
Chart (2007–08)	Peak position
Australia (ARIA)	37
Germany (GfK)	87
UK Singles (Official Charts Company)	114
US Billboard Hot 100	90
US Pop 100 (Billboard)	66
US Alternative Airplay (Billboard)	29
