= Every Second Counts (album) =

Studio album by Plain White T's
- Released: September 12, 2006
- Recorded: 2003–2006
- Studios: The Pass (Los Angeles, California); Slideaway Music Studio (Los Angeles, California); Pinewood Studios (Los Angeles, California)
- Genres: Alternative rock; pop-punk; pop rock; indie rock; emo
- Length: 44:09
- Labels: Hollywood; Fearless
- Producer: Johnny K

Plain White T's chronology
| All That We Needed (2005) | Every Second Counts (2006) | Big Bad World (2008) |

Singles from Every Second Counts
- 1. "Hey There Delilah" Released: May 9, 2006; 2. "Hate (I Really Don't Like You)" Released: August 15, 2006; 3. "Our Time Now" Released: September 25, 2007

Professional ratings
Review scores
| Source | Rating |
|---|---|
| AllMusic | 3.5/5 stars |
| Rocklouder | 3/5 stars |
| Entertainment.ie | 1/5 stars |

Every Second Counts is the fourth studio album by American rock band Plain White T's, released on September 12, 2006. It is the first Plain White T's album to be released on Hollywood Records along with Fearless Records. Its title is derived from a lyric in the song "Let Me Take You There".

The album peaked at number ten on the US Billboard 200 chart. The album was certified platinum by the Recording Industry Association of America (RIAA) in March 2025.

== Commercial performance ==
Every Second Counts debuted at number 89 on the US Billboard 200 chart on the week of September 30, 2006. The album reached its peak at number ten on the chart on the date issued August 11, 2007, selling 39,000 copies that week. On July 3, 2007, the album was certified gold by the Recording Industry Association of America (RIAA) for sales of over 500,000 copies in the United States.

In the United Kingdom, the album peaked at number three on the UK Albums Chart. On July 22, 2013, the album was certified gold by the British Phonographic Industry (BPI) for sales of over 100,000 copies in the UK.

== Track listing ==
| No. | Title | Writer(s) | Length |
|---|---|---|---|
| 1. | "Our Time Now" | Tom Higgenson; Mia Koo; Mike Daly | 2:50 |
| 2. | "Come Back to Me" | Higgenson; Bret Mazur; Kraig Tyler | 3:23 |
| 3. | "Hate (I Really Don't Like You)" | Higgenson | 3:47 |
| 4. | "You and Me" | Higgenson | 2:18 |
| 5. | "Friends Don't Let Friends Dial Drunk" | Higgenson; Mazur; Tyler | 3:22 |
| 6. | "Making a Memory" | Higgenson; Daly | 2:49 |
| 7. | "So Damn Clever" | Higgenson; Matthew Gerrard | 3:03 |
| 8. | "Tearin' Us Apart" | Higgenson | 2:36 |
| 9. | "Write You a Song" | Higgenson | 4:01 |
| 10. | "Gimme a Chance" | Higgenson; Koo | 2:57 |
| 11. | "Figure It Out" | Higgenson; Daly | 2:45 |
| 12. | "Let Me Take You There" | Higgenson | 3:46 |
| Total length: | | | 44:09 |

Bonus edition
| No. | Title | Writer(s) | Length |
|---|---|---|---|
| 13. | "Hey There Delilah^{[a]}" | Higgenson | 3:52 |

International edition bonus track
| No. | Title | Writer(s) | Length |
|---|---|---|---|
| 14. | "Take Me Away" | Higgenson | 2:44 |

iTunes Store bonus track
| No. | Title | Writer(s) | Length |
|---|---|---|---|
| 14. | "Hold On" | Higgenson | 2:40 |

Deluxe edition bonus tracks
| No. | Title | Writer(s) | Length |
|---|---|---|---|
| 13. | "Hey There Delilah" | Higgenson | 3:53 |
| 14. | "We Can Work It Out" | Lennon-McCartney | 2:15 |
| 15. | "Hold On" | Higgenson | 2:40 |

Notes

- ^{^[a]}"Hey There Delilah" appears as track one on some editions of the album.

=== DVD ===
The DVD includes a live concert in the band's hometown, Chicago. The set list was:

1. "Our Time Now"
2. "Revenge"
3. "All That We Needed"
4. "Stop"
5. "Friends Don't Let Friends Dial Drunk"
6. "You and Me"
7. "Come Back to Me"
8. "Write You a Song"
9. "Tearin' Us Apart"
10. "So Damn Clever"
11. "Let Me Take You There"
12. "Hate (I Really Don't Like You)"
13. "Hey There Delilah"
14. "Take Me Away"

== Personnel ==
Plain White T's

- Tom Higgenson – lead vocals, acoustic guitar
- Tim G. Lopez – lead guitar, backing vocals
- Dave Tirio – rhythm guitar
- Mike Retondo – bass guitar, backing vocals
- De'Mar Hamilton – drums, percussion

Additional musicians

- Stephen Barber – keyboards

== Charts ==
=== Weekly charts ===
Weekly chart performance for Every Second Counts
| Chart (2007–2008) | Peak position |
|---|---|
| Australian Albums (ARIA) | 45 |
| Austrian Albums (Ö3 Austria) | 27 |
| Belgian Albums (Ultratop Flanders) | 98 |
| Belgian Alternative Albums (Ultratop Flanders) | 50 |
| Canadian Albums (Nielsen SoundScan) | 24 |
| Dutch Albums (Album Top 100) | 66 |
| European Albums (Billboard) | 11 |
| French Albums (SNEP) | 65 |
| German Albums (Offizielle Top 100) | 26 |
| Irish Albums (IRMA) | 2 |
| Scottish Albums (Official Charts) | 7 |
| Swiss Albums (Schweizer Hitparade) | 66 |
| UK Albums (Official Charts) | 3 |
| US Billboard 200 | 10 |
| US Top Alternative Albums (Billboard) | 3 |
| US Top Rock Albums (Billboard) | 3 |

=== Year-end charts ===
Year-end chart performance for Every Second Counts
| Chart (2007) | Position |
|---|---|
| UK Albums (OCC) | 102 |
| US Billboard 200 | 107 |
| US Top Rock Albums (Billboard) | 23 |

== Certifications ==
Certifications and sales for Every Second Counts
| Region | Certification | Certified units/sales |
|---|---|---|
| Ireland (IRMA) | Gold | 7,500^{^} |
| United Kingdom (BPI) | Gold | 100,000^{*} |
| United States (RIAA) | Platinum | 1,000,000^{‡} |
^{*} Sales figures based on certification alone.^{^} Shipments figures based on certification alone.^{‡} Sales+streaming figures based on certification alone.
