= Ariel Rechtshaid =

American record producer

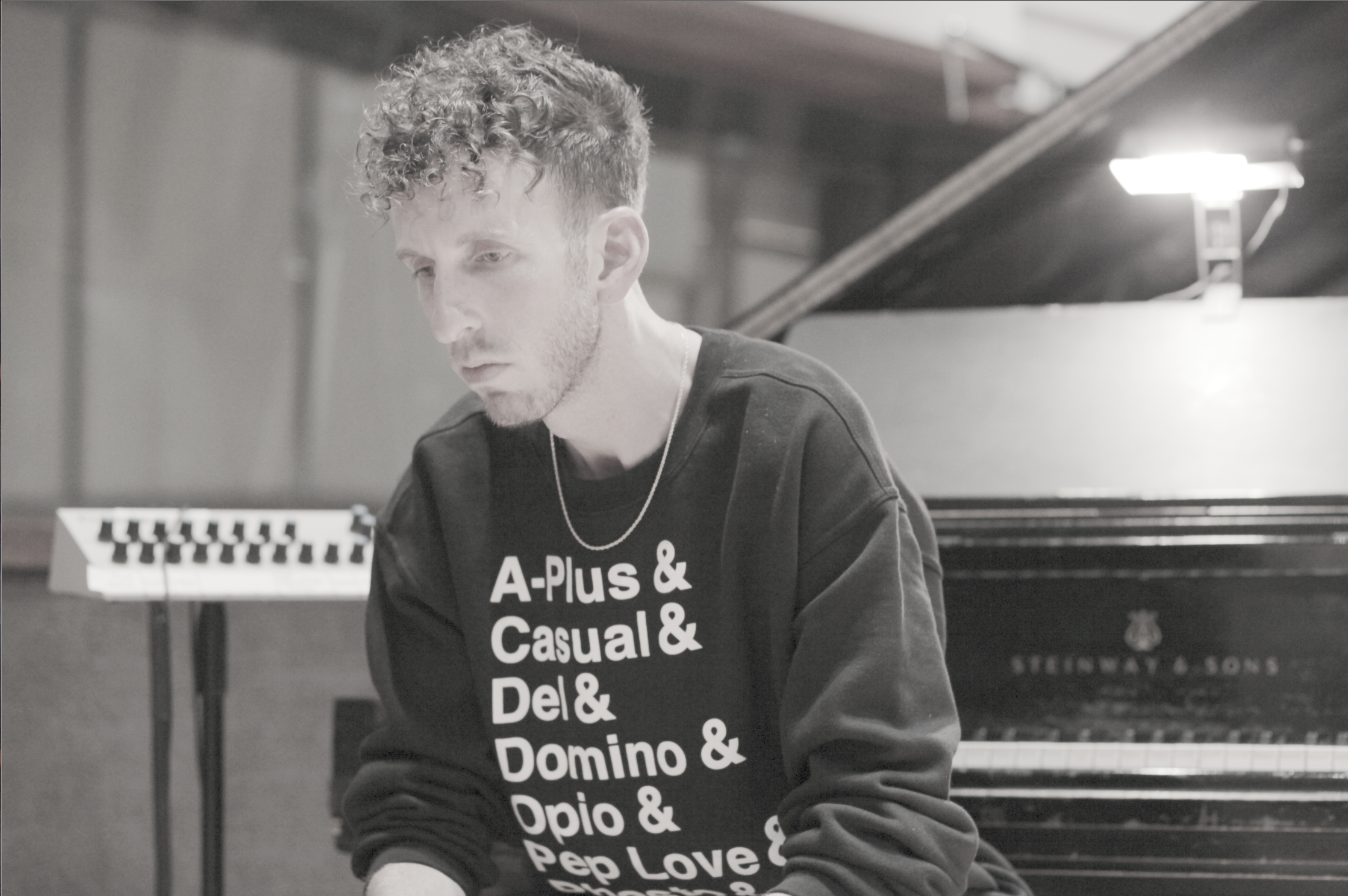
- Rechtshaid in 2013

Background information
- Born: Ariel Zvi Rechtshaid; Los Angeles, California, U.S.
- Occupations: Record producer; songwriter; audio engineer; mixer
- Instruments: Vocals; guitar; keyboards; bass; drums; percussion
- Formerly of: Foreign Born; The Hippos

Ariel Zvi Rechtshaid (/ˈrɛkʃaɪd/ REK-shyde;) is an American record producer, audio engineer, mixing engineer, multi-instrumentalist, and songwriter. His accolades include three Grammy Awards for music production.

Rechtshaid was the lead singer and guitarist of the ska/pop-punk band The Hippos, and the bassist and producer of indie folk-rock group Foreign Born. In 2006, he produced the Billboard Hot 100 number one-charting single "Hey There Delilah" by the Plain White T's. He co-wrote and produced Usher's 2012 single "Climax", which won the 2013 Grammy award for Best R&B Performance. Rechtshaid was nominated for the 2014 Grammy award for Producer of the Year. He has won Grammys for production on Vampire Weekend album Modern Vampires of the City (2013, Best Alternative Music Album), Adele album 25 (2015, Album of the Year), and for another Vampire Weekend album Father of the Bride (2019, again Best Alternative Music Album).

His production, songwriting, and mixing credits include Haim, Vampire Weekend, Madonna, Usher, Adele, Brandon Flowers, Charli XCX, Kelela, Cass McCombs, Solange Knowles, Tobias Jesso Jr., Murs, Sky Ferreira, Grace Ives, We Are Scientists, Kylie Minogue, U2, Glasser, Alex Clare, and Major Lazer.

== Early life ==
Rechtshaid was born and raised in Los Angeles, California, a second-generation American born to Israeli immigrants. He is Jewish. He attended Hamilton High School in the Los Angeles Unified School District, where he would form his first band, The Hippos. One of his high school classmates was rapper Murs, with whom he would later record and produce.

== Career ==
=== The Hippos ===
Rechtshaid would help form The Hippos in 1995, while he and other members were still in high school. He fronted the band as the singer and guitarist with friends James Bairian on bass, Louis Castle on trumpet, Brandon Bairian on percussion, Roman Fleysher on saxophone, Danny Rukasin on trombone, and Kyle Briggs on drums. They began to play shows around southern California, and recorded and self-released cassette demos titled Spreading the Cheese and Attack of the Killer Cheese. Shortly after this they were joined by Rich Zahniser on trombone. Despite their proximity to the Orange County ska scene, they found themselves shut out since they were from Los Angeles. Still, through perseverance and talent, they established themselves among a ska scene including bands such as Reel Big Fish, No Doubt, Dance Hall Crashers, and The Aquabats. The band would go on to release two full-length albums on Fueled By Ramen/Vagrant Records and Interscope, as well as a self-released third full-length consisting of demos produced by Rechtshaid from their later years.

"By the time [Rechtshaid] was 18/19, [he] knew [he] wasn't happy – and [he] quit. Part of the problem was benchmarking his efforts against his heroes". He later wrote the music in different genres for commercials.

=== Foreign Born ===
Rechtshaid joined the band as a bassist and producer in Los Angeles in late 2003. They self-released their first 12" single ("We Had Pleasure" b/w "Escape"), followed by their debut EP "In the Remote Woods" via StarTime International Records. While touring the US and UK with St. Vincent, Grizzly Bear, Vampire Weekend, Rogue Wave, Jason Collett, Cold War Kids, Giant Drag, and We Are Scientists, they recorded their first full-length album, On the Wing Now, in the fall/winter of 2005, and officially released the album with Dim Mak on August 21, 2007. They released their second album, Person to Person, on Secretly Canadian on June 23, 2009.

=== Production, writing, and mixing ===
After Plain White T's' 2006 single "Hey There Delilah", which Rechtshaid recorded and produced, eventually reached number 1 on the US and number 2 on the UK charts, he started getting approached by labels and managers.

Rechtshaid's production, songwriting, and mixing is found on a wide range of albums and genres. He has written with and produced for acts such as Haim, Vampire Weekend, Adele, Beyoncé, Madonna, Kylie Minogue, Usher, Blood Orange, Carly Rae Jepsen, Charli XCX, Kelela, Solange Knowles, Sky Ferreira, Plain White T's, Cass McCombs, Theophilus London, Glasser, We Are Scientists, Major Lazer, Foreign Born, Valencia, and Murs. He is also a founder and partner in music publishing and production company Heavy Duty.

He is a three-time Grammy award winner.

== Personal life ==
During the production of Haim's second studio album Something to Tell You (2017), Rechtshaid was diagnosed with stage I testicular cancer. He was in a relationship with Haim frontwoman Danielle Haim from 2013 to early 2022.

== Discography ==
=== Composer discography ===
- 2021: Gossip Girl soundtrack
- 2022: The Santa Clauses soundtrack

=== With The Hippos ===
- 2003: The Hippos, Olympic Records (LP)
- 1999 August: Heads Are Gonna Roll, Interscope (LP)
- 1997 February: Forget the World Fueled By Ramen/Stiff Dog/Vagrant Records (LP)

=== With Foreign Born ===
- 2009 June: Person to Person, Secretly Canadian (LP)
- 2007 August: On the Wing Now, Dim Mak (LP)
- 2005 June: In the Remote Woods, StarTime International Records (EP)
