= Hey There Delilah =

- Single cover

Single by Plain White T's

from the album All That We Needed and Every Second Counts
- B-side: "Easy Way Out"
- Written: 2002
- Released: May 9, 2006
- Recorded: April 21, 2004
- Studio: Hard Drive Studio (North Hollywood, Los Angeles, California)
- Genre: Folk-pop; emo pop; emo
- Length: 3:52
- Label: Hollywood; Fearless
- Songwriter: Tom Higgenson
- Producers: Jay Bolta; Robert Dimonda; Ariel Rechtshaid; Sean O'Keefe

Plain White T's singles chronology
"Take Me Away" (2005)	"Hey There Delilah" (2006)	"Hate (I Really Don't Like You)" (2006)

Music video
- "Hey There Delilah" on YouTube

"Hey There Delilah" is a song by American pop rock band Plain White T's. It was released in 2005, as an EP from their third studio album, All That We Needed (2005). The song was later released in 2007 as a single from their fourth studio album, Every Second Counts (2006), with added string instrumentation.

The song reached No. 1 on the US Billboard Hot 100 in July 2007. It was nominated at the 50th Grammy Awards in 2008 for Song of the Year and Best Pop Performance by a Duo or Group with Vocals.

== Background and writing ==
The song was written by frontman Tom Higgenson after meeting Delilah DiCrescenzo, a nationally ranked American steeplechase and cross country runner, through a mutual friend around 2002.

Higgenson stated: "I thought she was the most beautiful girl I had ever seen, I told her, 'I have a song about you already.' Obviously, there was no song. But I thought it was smooth." DiCrescenzo turned him down. Although she was dating somebody else at the time, she kept in touch with Higgenson. A year later, he had finished the song. About the actual writing, Higgenson said: "Because I wasn't with Delilah, I had to imagine, 'If I was with this girl, what would I want to tell her?'" In late 2004, Higgenson brought DiCrescenzo a disc with the finished song.

DiCrescenzo stated she found it difficult to deal with the popularity of a song written about her. "When I'm at the gym, it's playing; when I'm at the pool, it's playing. Part of me wants to scream at the top of my lungs that it's about me. Another part of me wants to cower and say it's not. [...] It was so beautifully written. There was pressure to live up to this ideal. I didn't know how to be polite but, you know, ditch him."

"Hey There Delilah" is written in the key of D major, with a tempo of 104 beats per minute in common time.

The song was recorded and produced by Ariel Rechtshaid in North Hollywood, Los Angeles. The band's fourth album, Every Second Counts, has "Hey There Delilah" as a bonus track with a string section written and performed by Eric Remschneider augmenting the original recording, also present in the song's official music video.

== Release ==
Plain White T's released the song in May 2006 as the third single from their third studio album All That We Needed. In 2007, over one year after the song's release, it became the band's first hit in the United States, eventually reaching number one on the Billboard Hot 100 in July, marking the first Hot 100 No. 1 entry for Hollywood Records and Disney Music Group in the chart. From July 3 through July 28, 2007, it was the most played song on radio and the most downloaded song on the US iTunes Music Store.

It was Plain White T's first major hit. It also reached number two in the UK. The song ended 2007 as the year's 14th biggest-selling single in the UK.

Since its release, it has sold over 4,000,000 digital copies in the US alone.

== Music video ==
The official music video was directed by Jay Martin. It features Higgenson singing the song while the band members are in another room behind him. The other band members are not playing in the song. The only other instruments are the strings provided by Eric Remschneider, who does not appear in the video. In a split-screen, it shows Delilah, played by model Melissa McNelis, who attends college in New York City.

== Critical reception ==
Time magazine named "Hey There Delilah" one of The 10 Best Songs of 2007, ranking it number seven. Music critic Josh Tyrangiel called it "an intimate love song that's damn near universal". Tyrangiel praised the Plain White T's for managing to make another "aching guy reaching out to distant girl song feel fresh", singling out singer Tom Higgenson's otherwise imperfect voice and "nasal delivery [for making] the nearly-comic sincerity of the lyrics seem completely genuine". AllMusic positively compared the song to "Thirteen" by Big Star.

The song was a double 2008 Grammy Award nominee, for Song of the Year (won by Amy Winehouse) and Best Pop Performance by a Duo or Group with Vocal (won by Maroon 5). DiCrescenzo attended the gala that year as the guest of Higgenson.

On VH1's Top 40 Videos of 2007, "Hey There Delilah" was number eight, ahead of "If Everyone Cared" by Nickelback and behind "Say It Right" by Nelly Furtado. VH1 had the song at number 78 on its list of the 100 Greatest Songs of the '00s.

In 2017, Jamie Milton of NME said the track was one of the worst songs of the 2000s. She wrote: "It's earnest, self-indulgent pap of the highest order. This song is so wet that it's given me swimmers' ear, which makes the narrator's self-regarding message – stand by myself while I take over the world with my forgettable, dreary acoustic guitar song – even more egregious."

== Personnel ==
Album version

- Tom Higgenson − vocals, acoustic guitar

Single version

- Tom Higgenson − vocals, backing vocals, acoustic guitar
- Eric Remschneider − strings

== Charts ==
=== Weekly charts ===
Weekly chart performance for "Hey There Delilah"
Chart (2007–2008)	Peak position
Australia (ARIA)	3
Austria (Ö3 Austria Top 40)	2
Belgium (Ultratop 50 Flanders)	2
Belgium (Ultratop 50 Wallonia)	29
Canada Hot 100 (Billboard)	1
Croatia (HRT)	4
Czech Republic Airplay (ČNS IFPI)	1
Denmark (Tracklisten)	21
Europe (Eurochart Hot 100 Singles)	1
France (SNEP)	26
Germany (GfK)	1
Germany Airplay (BVMI)	1
Italy (FIMI)	14
Ireland (IRMA)	2
Netherlands (Dutch Top 40)	8
Netherlands (Single Top 100)	8
New Zealand (Recorded Music NZ)	9
Norway (VG-lista)	15
Scottish Singles Sales (Official Charts)	5
Slovakia Airplay (ČNS IFPI)	4
Sweden (Sverigetopplistan)	6
Switzerland (Schweizer Hitparade)	9
UK Singles (Official Charts)	2
US Billboard Hot 100	1
US Adult Contemporary (Billboard)	3
US Adult Pop Airplay (Billboard)	1
US Alternative Airplay (Billboard)	3
US Pop Airplay (Billboard)	2
US Pop 100 (Billboard)	1

2026 weekly chart performance for "Hey There Delilah"
Chart (2026)	Peak position
Global 200 (Billboard)	198

=== Year-end charts ===
2007 year-end chart performance for "Hey There Delilah"
Chart (2007)	Position
Australia (ARIA)	21
Austria (Ö3 Austria Top 40)	37
Belgium (Ultratop 50 Flanders)	38
Brazil (Crowley)	136
Europe (Eurochart Hot 100 Singles)	12
Germany (Official German Charts)	23
Ireland (IRMA)	5
Netherlands (Dutch Top 40)	15
Netherlands (Single Top 100)	28
New Zealand (Recorded Music NZ)	34
Sweden (Sverigetopplistan)	63
Switzerland (Schweizer Hitparade)	54
UK Singles (OCC)	14
US Billboard Hot 100	7
US Adult Contemporary (Billboard)	20
US Adult Top 40 (Billboard)	10
US Alternative Airplay (Billboard)	9

2008 year-end chart performance for "Hey There Delilah"
Chart (2008)	Position
Canada (Canadian Hot 100)	73
Canada AC (Billboard)	14
Europe (Eurochart Hot 100 Singles)	65
Germany (Official German Charts)	98
US Adult Contemporary (Billboard)	16

=== Decade-end charts ===
Decade-end chart performance for "Hey There Delilah"
Chart (2000–2009)	Position
US Billboard Hot 100	97

== Certifications ==
Certifications for "Hey There Delilah"
Region	Certification	Certified units/sales
Australia (ARIA)	Platinum	70,000^{^}
Brazil (Pro-Música Brasil)	Gold	30,000^{‡}
Canada (Music Canada)	3× Platinum	120,000^{*}
Denmark (IFPI Danmark)	Platinum	90,000^{‡}
Germany (BVMI)	Platinum	300,000^{‡}
Italy (FIMI)	Platinum	50,000^{‡}
New Zealand (RMNZ)	5× Platinum	150,000^{‡}
Spain (Promusicae)	Gold	30,000^{‡}
United Kingdom (BPI)	3× Platinum	1,800,000^{‡}
United States (RIAA)	7× Platinum	4,476,000
^{*} Sales figures based on certification alone.^{^} Shipments figures based on certification alone.^{‡} Sales+streaming figures based on certification alone.

== Other versions ==
In March 2008, the Sugababes released a cover of the song as a B-side to "Denial".

The band was featured on Sesame Street in 2008 with the song "I'm the Letter T" (to the tune of "Hey There Delilah"). Higgenson provided the vocals for the animated letter T who sings the spoof. When asked if he was excited, Higgenson responded, "Yeah, hello! It's a dream. But it's just my voice. There's going to be some Muppet singing it on the screen."

In 2020, Kallista Rowan first published a version called "Hey it's Delilah" from Delilah's perspective in her enduring long-distance relationship with the singer of "Hey There Delilah". In the same year Jessica Ricca made a version also called "Hey it's Delilah" from Delilah's perspective after the long-distance relationship fell apart, the singer of "Hey There Delilah" had a new girlfriend and Delilah felt heartbroken. As of June 2023, this version has more than 10 million views on YouTube. Two years later Jessica made a second version of her "Hey it's Delilah" to finish Delilah's story with a goodbye song a week before Delilah's wedding to another man.

Also in 2020, American YouTuber Melody Martin made a parody named "Hey Jason Botterill', in which she takes shots at former Buffalo Sabres General Manager Jason Botterill.

American rapper Rod Wave interpolated the song on his 2021 single "By Your Side".

In 2023, an AI cover of the song using a vocal model based on Kanye West was brought to mainstream attention.

On July 31, 2026, Canadian singer LØLØ responds to "Hey There Delilah" by singing from the perspective of the girl in New York. LØLØ posted the cover on TikTok, catching the attention of frontman Tom Higgenson, who invited her to record it officially together.

=== Snowd4y version ===
In 2024, Canadian comedian Snowd4y and fellow Canadian rapper Drake released a rewritten version of the song infused with Toronto slang titled "Wah Gwan Delilah". It was one of Drake's first releases after his feud with Kendrick Lamar and was widely derided on social media. The excessive audio manipulation and poor overall quality of the song led many to falsely believe it was AI-generated, including the Plain White T's who captioned the rendition as leaving them "too stunned to speak;" Plain White T's frontman Tom Higgenson reacted to the cover with confusion, nonetheless remarking that it was "cool, whatever". It sparked wide internet confusion and mockery, and has divided people regarding its authenticity. Drake performed the song live for the first time at labelmate PartyNextDoor's Toronto concert on August 2 later in the year.

== Television series ==
In August 2018, it was announced by the band's frontman and songwriter, Tom Higgenson, that Lively McCabe Entertainment and Primary Wave, along with writer Jeremy Desmon, would be teaming up to develop a potential series based on the band's hit song. Expanding on the story within the song, the series is described as being a romantic dramedy telling the contemporary fairy tale of a long-distance flirtation between a struggling singer-songwriter and a New York City university student. The songwriter pledges to write a song for the young woman on the night they meet, and that promise changes their lives in unexpected ways. The series will be pitched to potential networks and streaming services.

== See also ==
- List of Billboard Hot 100 number-one singles of 2007
- List of Hot 100 number-one singles of 2007 (Canada)
- List of number-one hits of 2007 (Germany)
- List of European number-one hits of 2007
