= Plain White T's =

American rock band

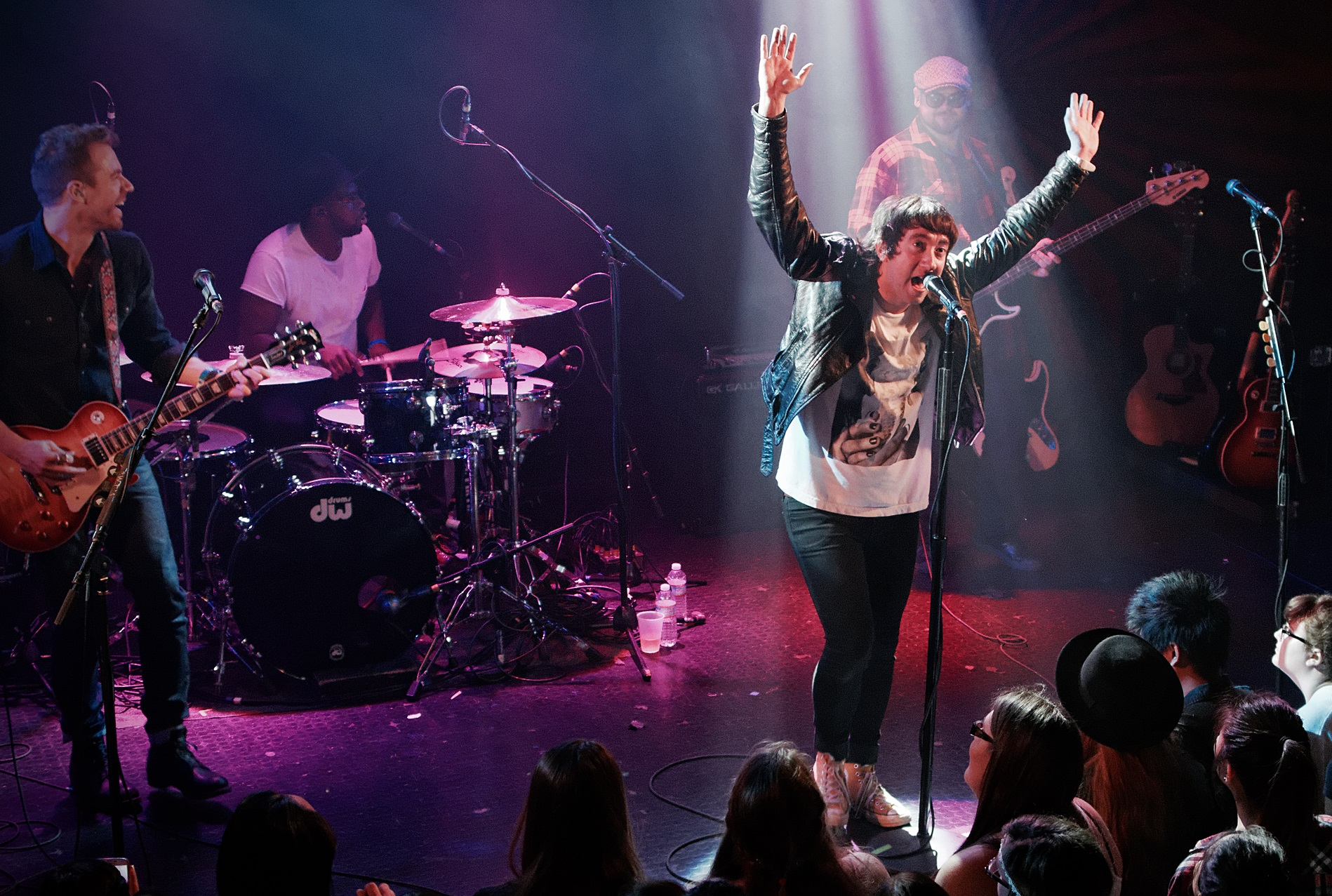
- Plain White T's performing in 2015; from left to right: Tim Lopez, De'Mar Hamilton, Tom Higgenson, Mike Retondo.

Background information
- Origin: Lombard, Illinois, U.S.
- Genres: Pop rock; pop-punk; soft rock; alternative rock; power pop; emo
- Works: Plain White T's discography
- Years active: 1997–present
- Labels: Fearless; Hollywood; Megaforce
- Spinoffs: That Lying Bitch
- Members: Tom Higgenson; Tim Lopez; Mike Retondo; De'Mar Hamilton
- Past members: Steve Mast; Ken Fletcher; Dave Tirio
- Website: plainwhitets.com

The Plain White T's is an American pop rock band from Lombard, Illinois, formed in 1997 by high school friends Tom Higgenson, Dave Tirio, and Ken Fletcher, and joined a short time later by Steve Mast. The group had a mostly underground following in Chicago basements, clubs, and bars in its early years.

The band is best known for their number-one hit song "Hey There Delilah", which achieved platinum status in 2007 and earned two Grammy nominations. The songs "1, 2, 3, 4" and "Rhythm of Love" were also certified platinum in 2009 and 2011 respectively. Founding member Tirio left the band in 2020, resulting in Higgenson remaining its sole original member.

== History ==
=== Formation (1997–1999) ===
The Plain White T's was formed in Lombard in early 1997. The group began as a trio, with Higgenson as singer and guitarist, Fletcher on bass guitar and Tirio on drums. The group played mostly local punk shows in Chicago's suburbs, eventually having gigs at the Metro in Chicago's Wrigleyville neighborhood. As the band began to establish itself in the local scene, a fourth member, Steve Mast, was recruited. He played lead guitar and sang backing vocals.

Higgenson broke several vertebrae in a car crash in 1999 while driving the band's van. He was in a back brace for three months and had to learn to walk again. Higgenson changed his songwriting process, choosing songs that were more meaningful to him, and the band began taking its music career more seriously.

=== Come on Over, Stop and lineup changes (1999–2003) ===
In 2000, the band recorded its first album, titled Come On Over. In 2002, the band self-financed the recording of Stop, a full-length album that attracted the attention of Fearless Records. While the band toured in support for the album, both Fletcher and Mast left in 2003; they were replaced by Tim Lopez and Mike Retondo. Shortly after, Tirio decided to switch from drumming to rhythm guitar and new drummer De'Mar Hamilton was added to the line-up.

=== All That We Needed (2004–2007) ===
The 2005 release, All That We Needed, was the first studio album from the reformed line-up, and featured the single "Hey There Delilah". In 2006 the band signed to Hollywood Records and recorded Every Second Counts, featuring a new version of "Hey There Delilah" with a string section. Every Second Counts was released in September 2006. That same year, "Hey There Delilah" reached #1 on the Billboard Hot 100 chart for two weeks. The song was written for the track star Delilah DiCrescenzo, whom Higgenson had met in 2002. The song received two Grammy nominations, and Every Second Counts was certified gold. In early 2006, the band teamed up with Motion City Soundtrack for a winter/spring tour.

=== Big Bad World (2007–2009) ===
In 2008, the group released the album Big Bad World. The album had two hit singles: "1, 2, 3, 4" and "Natural Disaster". Both were on the American Top 40 at numbers 1 and 2 for three consecutive weeks. By late 2008, the band had joined the Rock Band Live tour with Panic! at the Disco, Dashboard Confessional and The Cab. Later that year, the band played at the Give It a Name festival in the UK. In 2007, the band performed the single "Our Time Now" on an episode of the Nickelodeon television series, iCarly. "Our Time Now" was also played in commercials for the ABC Family dramedy series, Greek.

=== The Wonders of the Younger and Should've Gone to Bed EP (2009–2013) ===
The band's "Rhythm of Love" single was the first to be released from the group's 2010 album, The Wonders of the Younger. The song reached number five on the Hot AC chart, and was in the top ten in 2010 as well. In 2012, the band also covered the Ramones' "Pet Sematary" for the song soundtrack of the 2012 Disney film Frankenweenie. Should've Gone to Bed, a four-song EP, was released on April 9, 2013.

=== American Nights, Parallel Universe, and Plain White T's (2013–present) ===
The band left Hollywood Records after creative conflicts with the label during the production of the American Nights album. American Nights was released by Megaforce Records on March 31, 2015. The release date of American Nights was pushed back several times by their former record label, Hollywood Records. In 2015, they also appeared on Blues Traveler's album Blow Up the Moon, co-writing the song "Nikkia's Prom." On November 22, 2015, the band released a music video for "American Nights" featuring Higgenson's son, Lennon.

In May 2017, Plain White T's released a music video for their song "Land of the Living". The band, which had left their label Fearless in 2005, returned to the label. As of April 2017, the band has said that they are currently writing new music. The band performed "Hey There Delilah" at the 2017 Alternative Press Music Awards. In July 2017, the band closed the 2017 National Scout Jamboree, exactly 10 years after "Hey There Delilah" was number-one on the charts. In 2017, Plain White T's re-signed with Fearless Records. Their latest studio album, Parallel Universe, was released on August 24, 2018.

Tirio quit the band in October 2020, leaving Higgenson as the only remaining founding member.

After releasing six singles through 2023, Plain White T's officially released their self-titled studio album on November 17.

In September 2024, the band covered "Surface Pressure" for A Whole New Sound, a compilation album featuring pop-punk covers of songs from classic Disney films.

The band are confirmed to be making an appearance at Welcome to Rockville, which will take place in Daytona Beach, Florida in May 2026.

== Band members ==
=== Current ===
- Tom Higgenson – lead vocals, acoustic guitar, keyboards (1997–present), rhythm guitar (1997–2003, 2020–present)
- Tim G. Lopez – lead guitar, backing and occasional lead vocals (2003–present)
- Mike Retondo – bass, backing vocals (2003–present)
- De'Mar Randell Hamilton – drums, percussion (2003–present)

=== Former ===
- Steve Mast – lead guitar, backing vocals (1997–2003)
- Ken Fletcher – bass (1997–2003)
- Dave Tirio – drums, percussion (1997–2003), rhythm guitar (2003–2020)

== Discography ==
- Come On Over (2000)
- Stop (2002)
- All That We Needed (2005)
- Every Second Counts (2006)
- Big Bad World (2008)
- Wonders of the Younger (2010)
- American Nights (2015)
- Parallel Universe (2018)
- Plain White T's (2023)

== Tours ==
- 2005–2006: All That We Needed touring cycle
- 2006–2007: Every Second Counts touring cycle
- 2007–2008: Hey There Delilah / breakthrough touring period
- 2008–2009: Big Bad World Tour
- 2010–2011: Wonders of the Younger Tour
- 2015–2016: American Nights Tour
- 2018–2019: Parallel Universe Tour
- 2024–2025: Delilah vs. Juliet Tour (with We The Kings)
- 2026: Support act on the Up Up Down Down Tour with Yellowcard and New Found Glory

== Television ==
The following list includes a selection of television appearances made by the band and performances used by those and other shows:

- Greek – The band provides "Our Time Now" written by Mia Koo, Tom Higgenson and Mike Daly, as the theme for commercials and trailers for the show. The group appears playing the song as well as "Hey There Delilah" in the episode "The Rusty Nail". The group plays the songs "Friends Don't Let Friends Dial Drunk" and "Making a Memory" in the episode "Friday Night Frights", and the band also plays the songs "Come Back to Me", "You and Me" and "Let Me Take You There" in the episode "A New Normal". Tom and Dave also appear in the episode "The Great Cappie" as members of the Kappa Tau fraternity.
- iCarly – The band appears as a special guest for the webshow in the episode "iRue the Day", performing "Our Time Now".
- Hollyoaks – "Making a Memory" was featured in the final episode to feature Katy Fox (Hannah Tointon) in the UK soap opera, symbolizing what should be happening rather than what was happening.
- "Revenge" is used as the theme song to the NYC Media show Secrets of New York.
- "1234" and "Gimme a Chance" were featured in the teen drama 90210.
- "1234" was used in a Hallmark Cards commercial for Valentine's Day 2010 and the music video appeared in Beavis and Butt-Head's 8th season.
- "Rhythm of Love" was used in a fall 2010 promo for the season two premiere of Parenthood on NBC, in One Tree Hill, in a fall 2010 promo for the season premiere of Secret Life of the American Teenager on ABC Family, in a TV advertisement for a rental DVD company in the UK called LoveFilm, in the closing credits of the 2011 film No Strings Attached and in a TV advertisement for Estée Lauder Pleasures Eau Fraîche in 2012.
- Lead guitarist Tim Lopez was a bachelor contestant on NBC's reality show, Ready For Love.
- The song "Dance Off Time" was played in the season 3, episode 8 of Switched at Birth.
- The band performed in the 89th Macy's Thanksgiving Day Parade on November 26, 2015. They performed "American Nights" which was broadcast on NBC.

== Awards ==
Grammy Award

Year	Nominee / work	Award	Result
2008	"Hey There Delilah"	Song of the Year	Nominated
2008	"Hey There Delilah"	Best Pop Performance by a Duo or Group with Vocals	Nominated

Tony Awards

Year	Recipient	Award	Result
2018	SpongeBob SquarePants	Best Original Score	Nominated

Teen Choice Awards

Year	Nominee / work	Award	Result
2007	"Hey There Delilah"	Choice Summer Song	Won

American Music Award

Year	Nominee / work	Award	Result
2007	Plain White T's	New Artist of the Year	Nominated

MTV Video Music Award

Year	Nominee / work	Award	Result
2007	"Hey There Delilah"	Monster Single of the Year	Nominated

mtvU Woodie Awards

Year	Nominee / work	Award	Result	Ref.
2006	Plain White T's	Breaking Woodie	Won	
2006	"Hey There Delilah"	Streaming Woodie	Nominated	
