= Scoop DeVille production discography =

The following list is a discography of production by Scoop DeVille, an American hip hop record producer from Los Angeles, California. It includes a list of songs produced, co-produced and remixed by year, artist, album and title.

== Singles produced ==
| Year | Single | Chart positions | | | Certification | Album |
| Year | Single | US Hot 100 | US R&B | US Rap | Certification | Album |
|---|---|---|---|---|---|---|
| 2008 | "Life of da Party" (Snoop Dogg featuring Too Short & Mistah F.A.B.) | 105 | 48 | 14 | | Ego Trippin' |
| 2009 | "I Wanna Rock" (Snoop Dogg) | 41 | 10 | 3 | | Malice n Wonderland |
| 2010 | "(Ha Ha) Slow Down" (Fat Joe featuring Young Jeezy) | – | 54 | 23 | | The Darkside, Vol. 1 |
| 2010 | "Hurt Locker" (Xzibit) | – | – | – | | MMX1 |
| 2010 | "New Year's Eve" (Snoop Dogg featuring Marty James) | – | 66 | – | | Non-album single |
| 2011 | "Haters" (Tony Yayo featuring 50 Cent, Shawty Lo & Roscoe Dash) | – | 112 | – | | TBA |
| 2012 | "The Recipe" (Kendrick Lamar featuring Dr. Dre) | 103 | 38 | 23 | | good kid, m.A.A.d city |
| 2013 | "Poetic Justice" (Kendrick Lamar featuring Drake) | 26 | 8 | 6 | RIAA: Gold | good kid, m.A.A.d city |
| 2014 | "Calm Down" (Busta Rhymes featuring Eminem) | 94 | 29 | 16 | | Extinction Level Event 2: The Wrath of God (Reloaded) |

== 2005 ==
=== Frost - Welcome to Frost Angeles ===
- 02. "So Kold"
- 03. "When The Lights Go Down" (feat. Genovese)
- 04. "The Kaper" (feat. Jay Tee & Cameosis)
- 05. "It's Tha Kid"
- 06. "Can Not Fuck Wit These Gangsta's" (feat. Bad Boy)
- 07. "It Ain't The Same"
- 08. "Shake Them Ho's"
- 09. "Til The Morning Light" (feat. Krystál)
- 10. "Los Borachos" (feat. Vato Loco Tone)
- 11. "We Run Shit"
- 12. "Think We Playin'" (feat. Bad Boy, Kree, Ryu & Tonic)
- 13. "My Reincarnation"

=== Fort Minor - Fort Minor: We Major ===
- 10. "Get It" (Styles of Beyond)
- 12. "Respect 4 Grandma" (feat. Styles of Beyond and Celph Titled)

== 2007 ==
=== Styles of Beyond - Razor Tag ===
- 17. "Kill 'em In the Face" (feat. Scoop DeVille)

=== Baby Bash - Cyclone ===
- 06. "Mamacita" (feat. Marcos Hernandez)
  - Sample Credit: "Voyage to Atlantis" by The Isley Brothers

== 2008 ==
=== Snoop Dogg - Ego Trippin' ===
- 01. "A Word Witchya! (Intro)"
  - Sample Credit: "Distant Lover" by Marvin Gaye
- 07. "Life of da Party" (feat. Too Short & Mistah F.A.B.)
- 17. "Ridin' In My Chevy"
- 18. "Those Gurlz" (Produced with Teddy Riley & DJ Quik)
  - Sample Credit: "Too Much Heaven" by Bee Gees

=== Murs - Murs for President ===
- 04. "The Science" (Produced with DJ Quik)
- 05. "Can It Be (Half a Million Dollars and 18 Months Later)"
  - Sample Credit: "I Wanna Be Where You Are" by Michael Jackson

== 2009 ==
=== B-Real - Smoke N Mirrors ===
- 03. "Don't Ya Dare Laugh" (feat. Young De & Xzibit)

=== Get Busy Committee - Uzi Does It ===
- Entire album (along with Apathy)

=== Playaz Circle - Flight 360: The Takeoff ===
- 03. "Quit Flossin'" (feat. The Casey Boys of Jagged Edge) (Produced with Get Busy Committee)

=== Snoop Dogg - Malice n Wonderland ===
- 02. "I Wanna Rock"
  - Sample Credit: "It Takes Two" by Rob Base and DJ E-Z Rock
- 05. "Different Languages" (feat. Jazmine Sullivan) (Produced with Teddy Riley & PMG)

== 2010 ==
=== Snoop Dogg - More Malice ===
- 01. "I Wanna Rock (The Kings G-Mix)" (feat. Jay-Z)
  - Sample Credit: "It Takes Two" by Rob Base and DJ E-Z Rock

=== Game - The R.E.D. Room ===
- 02. "Ha Ha" (feat. Nipsey Hussle)
  - Sample Credit: "Back to Life (However Do You Want Me)" by Soul II Soul
- 08. "Gangs of New York" (feat. Jadakiss & Jim Jones)
- 18. "Slangin' Rocks"

=== Fat Joe - The Darkside Vol. 1 ===
- 06. "(Ha Ha) Slow Down" (feat. Young Jeezy)
  - Sample Credit: "Back to Life (However Do You Want Me)" by Soul II Soul
- 08. "No Problems" (feat. Rico Love)
  - Sample Credit: "Flash's Theme" by Queen
  - Sample Credit: "Terminator X to the Edge of Panic" by Public Enemy

=== Das Racist - Sit Down, Man ===
- 18. "Sit Down, Man" (feat. El-P)

=== Bishop Lamont - The Shawshank Redemption/Angola 3 ===
- 13. "Anything" (feat. Ryu & Mike Ant)

=== Snoop Dogg - New Year's Eve (song) ===
- 01. "New Year's Eve" (feat. Marty James)

== 2011 ==
=== Snoop Dogg - Doggumentary ===
- 11. "El Lay" (feat. Marty James)
- 13. "This Weed Iz Mine" (feat. Wiz Khalifa)
  - Sample Credit: "This Beat Is Mine" by Vicky D

=== Clyde Carson ===
- "Somethin' To Speak About" (featuring Game)

=== Tony Yayo ===
- Haters (featuring 50 Cent, Shawty Lo & Roscoe Dash)

=== Demrick aka Young De x Scoop DeVille - Neva LOOK Back! ===
- 01. Neva LOOK Back!
- 02. Ain’t Saying Nothing
- 03. What’s Good?! (feat. Brevi)
- 04. People Keep Telling Me (feat. Kurupt)
- 05. Ready 2 Go (feat. Scoop DeVille, Xzibit & Brevi)
- 06. RUN (feat. Scoop DeVille)
- 07. What’s Good?! (Remix) (feat. Scoop DeVille & Cliquo Nico)

=== 50 Cent - The Big 10 ===
- 07. "Wait Until Tonight"

== 2012 ==
=== Kendrick Lamar - good kid, m.A.A.d city ===
- 06. "Poetic Justice" (featuring Drake)
  - Sample: "Any Time, Any Place" by Janet Jackson
- 13. "The Recipe" (featuring Dr. Dre)
  - Sample: "Meet the Frownies" by Twin Sister

== 2013 ==
=== Tech N9ne - Something Else ===
- 16. "Meant to Happen" (featuring Scoop DeVille)

=== Jim Jones ===
- 00. "Greenlight" (featuring Swizz Beatz)

=== Jonwayne - Rap Album One ===
- 04. The Come Up Pt. 1 (featuring Scoop DeVille)
- 10. Black Magic

== 2014 ==
=== Vince Staples - Shyne Coldchain Vol. 2 ===
- 07. "Nate" (featuring James Fauntleroy)

=== Fatima - Yellow Memories ===
- 07. "Ridin Round"

=== Busta Rhymes - Extinction Level Event 2: The Wrath of God (Reloaded) ===
- "Calm Down" (featuring Eminem)

=== Nipsey Hussle - Mailbox Money ===
- 06. "Only A Case" (featuring G.I. Joe & Conrad)

== 2015 ==
=== The Legalizers (Paul Wall & Baby Bash) - The Legalizers: Legalize or Die, Vol. 1 ===
- 03. Cherry Pie & OG Kush

=== Scoop DeVille & Demrick - Loud Pack: Extracts ===
- 01. The Escape (feat. Stori)
- 02. All Time High
- 03. N Doe Smoke (feat. Asher Roth)
- 04. Blowing Money Fast (feat. B-Real & Berner)
- 05. Reefer Madness
- 06. Kush Cloud (feat. Paul Wall)
- 07. I'm Smoked Out
- 08. No Tint
- 09. Relieve
- 10. Zone
- 11. Murda Murda (feat. Berner & Paul Wall)

=== Paul Wall - Slab God ===
- 01. "Swangin' In The Rain"

=== Raekwon - Fly International Luxurious Art ===
- 07. "1,2 1,2" (featuring Snoop Dogg)

=== Summer Cocktail ===
- 01. Blitzkrieg Bop - WolfBlitzBop
- 02. Tin Man - Tin n Juice
- 03. Shout - Wolf Fears
- 04. This Charming Man - Vogue And Vodka
- 05. Take It Easy - Disco Darjeeling
- 06. I Get Around - Sex On The Beach
- 07. Corcovado - Lobo Lemonade

=== Watercolour Werewolf ===
- Tides
- Survival
- DontJuly

=== LBC Movement & DJ Drama - Beach City ===
- 01. Back Up (featuring Snoop Dogg)

== 2016 ==
=== Demrick - Collect Call ===
- 03. Watch This (feat. Lil Debbie)
- 05. Freak Show
- 06. Pocket Full Of Green
- 09. Broke Down The Walls
