= More Malice =

Studio album (reissue) by Snoop Dogg
- Released: March 23, 2010
- Recorded: 2009–10
- Genre: Hip hop
- Labels: Doggystyle; Priority
- Producers: Snoop Dogg (exec.); B-Don; Dae One; Diplo; Dr. Dre; Drumma Boy; Mayer Hawthorne; Nottz; Paul Devro; PMG; Sakke; Scoop DeVille; The-Dream; Tricky Stewart; Travis Barker

Snoop Dogg chronology
We da West, Vol. 1 (2010)	More Malice (2010)	Tha Unreleased, Vol. 1 (2010)

Singles from More Malice
- 1. "I Wanna Rock (The Kings' G-Mix)" Released: January 26, 2010; 2. "That Tree" Released: March 12, 2010

Professional ratings
Review scores
Source	Rating
Allmusic	3/5 stars
RapReviews	7.5/10 stars
HipHopDX	(3.75/5)

More Malice is the reissue of American recording artist Snoop Dogg's tenth studio album Malice n Wonderland (2009). All the songs from the album are on the re-release with five new tracks, four remixes, one song included on Malice n Wonderland and a movie, which stars Jamie Foxx, Xzibit, Denyce Lawton and DJ Quik, among others, which was simultaneously released with the album on March 23, 2010. The first single of the album is the remix of the original album's third single, "I Wanna Rock", known as "I Wanna Rock (The Kings G-Mix)", which features fellow American rapper Jay-Z. A new song titled "That Tree", featuring fellow American rapper Kid Cudi, was released in February 2010. Snoop Dogg also added the remix of "Pronto", which features Soulja Boy Tell 'Em and Bun B. On April 9, 2010, the music video for "That Tree", directed by Erick Peyton and VisualCreatures, was uploaded on Snoop Dogg's YouTube and Vevo account.

== Commercial performance ==
The re-release charted at number 29 on the US Billboard 200, selling 15,400 copies in the first week.

== Track listing ==
No.	Title	Writer(s)	Producer(s)	Length
1.	"I Wanna Rock (The Kings G-Mix)" (featuring Jay-Z)	Eric Barrier, Calvin Broadus, Shawn Carter, Elijah Molina, William Griffin	Scoop DeVille, Dr. Dre (mixing)	4:00
2.	"Protocol"	Broadus	Nottz	3:14
3.	"So Gangsta" (featuring Butch Cassidy)	Broadus, Danny Means	Dae One	3:47
4.	"House Shoes"	Broadus, Christopher Gholson	Drumma Boy	3:05
5.	"That Tree" (featuring Kid Cudi)	Broadus, Paul Devro, Scott Mescudi, Thomas Pentz	Diplo, Paul Devro (add.)	4:31
6.	"You're Gonna Luv Me" (featuring Mac Lucci)	Broadus	Sakke	3:03
7.	"Pronto (G-Mix)" (featuring Soulja Boy & Bun B)	Broadus, Bernard Freeman, DeAndre Way	B-Don, Super Ced (Co.)	5:21
8.	"Gangsta Luv" (featuring The-Dream)	Broadus, Terius Nash, Christopher Stewart	Tricky Stewart, The-Dream	4:17
Total length:				31:18

iTunes Deluxe edition bonus tracks
No.	Title	Writer(s)	Producer(s)	Length
9.	"Gangsta Luv (Mayer Hawthorne G-Mix)"	Broadus	Mayer Hawthorne	3:50
10.	"I Wanna Rock (Travis Barker G-Mix)"	Broadus	Travis Barker	4:00
Total length:				39:08

• (add.) Additional production
• (co.) Co-producer

Sample credits

- "I Wanna Rock (The Kings G-Mix)" contains a sample of "It Takes Two" as performed by Rob Base and DJ E-Z Rock, "Microphone Fiend" as performed by Eric B. & Rakim and "Think About It" as performed by Lyn Collins.
- "You're Gonna Love Me" contains a sample of "I Gave To You" as performed by The Delfonics.
- "That Tree" contains a sample of "Hey Gidî" Kurdish folk song as performed by Ibrahim Tatlises in 1989.

== Personnel ==
Credits adapted from Allmusic.

- Lucky Alvarez - design, layout
- B-Don - producer
- Mike Bozzi - assistant
- Aaron "A-Game" Brunson - keyboard
- Bun B - vocals
- Butch Cassidy - vocals
- Dae One - producer
- Makayla Davis - background - vocals
- Dee Dimes - background vocals
- Scoop DeVille - producer
- Paul Devro - additional producer
- Diplo - mixing, producer
- Dr. Dre - mixing
- Shon Don - engineer
- The-Dream - vocals, producer
- Brian Gardner - mastering
- Martin Gee - photography
- Drumma Boy - producer
- Donovan Gold - photography
- Todd Harris - artwork
- Tasha Hayward - hair stylist
- Dustin Hess - bass
- Richard Huredia - mixing, remixing
- Mauricio Iragorri - mixing
- Holli Joyce Ivory - background vocals
- Jaycen Joshua - mixing
- Jay-Z - vocals
- Young Guru - engineer
- Justin Keitt - background vocals
- Kid Cudi - vocals
- Cha'nelle Lewis - background vocals
- Kori Lewis - assistant
- Justin Li - A&R
- Giancarlo Lino - mixing assistant
- Mac Lucci - vocals
- Deborah Mannis-Gardner - sample clearance
- Ryan McNeely - logo
- Marq Moody - engineer
- Luis Navarro - assistant engineer
- Jesse Novak - assistant engineer
- Estevan Oriol - photographer
- Robert Reyes - assistant engineer
- April Roomet - wardrobe
- Marcus Rutledge - engineer
- Sakke - producer
- Snoop Dogg - arranger, executive producer, primary artist
- Soulja Boy - vocals
- Miguel Starcevich - photography
- Tricky Stewart - producer
- T'yana Shani Stewart - background vocals
- Ethan Sugar - engineer
- Paul Sun - photography
- Super Ced - drum programming, producer
- Brian "B-Luv" Thomas - engineer
- Pat Thrall - engineer
- Frank Vasquez - engineer
- Andrew Wuepper - engineer
- Damizza - engineer

== Charts ==
=== Weekly charts ===
Chart (2010)	Peak position
Canada Albums (Nielsen Soundscan)	131
Greek Albums (IFPI)	45
US Billboard 200	29
US Top R&B/Hip-Hop Albums (Billboard)	10
US Top Rap Albums (Billboard)	3

=== Year-end charts ===
Chart (2010)	Position
US Top R&B/Hip-Hop Albums	90
