= Terrace Martin production discography =

The following is a discography of production by Terrace Martin.

== Singles produced ==
- 2008
  - "Neva Have 2 Worry" (Snoop Dogg featuring Uncle Chucc)
- 2009
  - "L.O.V.E" (Frank Nitt featuring DJ Quik & J. Black)
  - "I'm Burnt" (Kurupt featuring Problem)
- 2010
  - "Upside Down" (Snoop Dogg featuring Nipsey Hussle & Problem)
  - "Frontline" (Crazy Toones featuring WC)
  - "In Gotti We Trust" (Kurupt featuring Xzibit)
  - "Questions" (Kurupt featuring Uncle Chucc)
  - "Go Girl" (Frank Nitt featuring Problem)
- 2011
  - "On Point" (Strong Arm Steady featuring Too Short)
- 2016
  - "Ghetto Boy" (Remix) (Lalah Hathaway featuring Snoop Dogg)

== 2004 ==
=== 213 - The Hard Way ===
- 12. "Joysticc"

=== Shawnna - Worth tha Weight ===
- 14. "Super Freak"

=== Chico & Coolwadda - Parallel ===
- 02. "Parallel"

== 2005 ==
=== Various Artists - Boss'n Up ===
- 03. "No Sticks, No Seeds" (9 Inch Dix)
- 04. "Shake That Shit" (Tiffany Foxx feat. Snoop Dogg & Young Walt)

=== Warren G - In the Mid-Nite Hour ===
- 10. "PYT" (feat. Snoop Dogg & Nate Dogg)

=== Snoop Dogg - Bigg Snoop Dogg Presents...Welcome to tha Chuuch: Da Album ===
- 02. "Shake That Shit" (Tiffany Foxx feat. Snoop Dogg & Young Walt)
- 06. "Sunshine" (J. Black) (Produced with Marlon Williams)
- 06. "If" (Wendi & YN feat. Snoop Dogg & J. Black)

== 2006 ==
=== Snoop Dogg - Tha Blue Carpet Treatment ===
- 08. "Gangbangin' 101" (feat. The Game)

== 2007 ==
=== Snoop Dogg - Snoop Dogg Presents The Big Squeeze ===
- 15. "Be Thankful" (Terrace Martin, J. Black & Uncle Chucc)

=== Talib Kweli - Eardrum ===
- 10. "Give 'Em Hell" (feat. Lyfe Jennings) (Produced with Battlecat)
  - Sample Credit: "I'm Glad You're Mine" by Al Green

=== Terrace Martin - Signal Flow ===
- 01. "Message From MC Wack"
- 02. "Signal Flow Intro" (feat. Snoop Dogg)
- 03. "Ridin'" (feat. Snoop Dogg, Problem & Scar)
- 04. "To The Top" (feat. The Game, Snoop Dogg & Uncle Chucc)
- 05. "Enemy Lines" (feat. Busta Rhymes, Chauncy Black & Spliff Starr)
- 06. "Watch Me Fall" (feat. Tru Life, Snoop Dogg & J. Black)
- 07. "Fear & Respect" (feat. Snoop Dogg)
- 08. "Be Thankful"
- 09. "Hoe Hoe Hoe" (feat. Nate Dogg & Snoop Dogg)
- 10. "All Night" (feat. Kurupt, Mykestro & Problem)
- 11. "Bitch" (feat. Too Short & Yung Walt)
- 12. "Problem Smoke Break For Terrace"
- 13. "No Violence" (feat. Kurupt)
- 14. "Blast/Apologize" (feat. Snoop Dogg & Kurupt)
- 15. "Ridin' Music" (feat. Kurupt & Problem)
- 16. "Westside" (feat. Snoop Dogg, J. Black & Tone)
- 17. "Conversation For The People" (feat. Problem)
- 18. "Listen" (feat. Problem)

== 2008 ==
=== Snoop Dogg - Ego Trippin' ===
- 05. "Neva Have 2 Worry" (feat. Uncle Chucc)
- 14. "Been Around Tha World"
- 00. "Shootem Up" (feat. Daz Dillinger)

=== Glasses Malone - The Electric Chair ===
- 29. "Just Another Day" (feat. Bloc Boyz)

=== Lalah Hathaway - Self Portrait ===
- 07. "1 Mile"
- 11. "UDO"

=== Murs - Murs for President ===
- 09. "Time Is Now" (feat. Snoop Dogg & LaToya Williams)
- 13. "A Part of Me"

=== Terrace Martin - Locke High (DJ Drama Edition) ===
- 01. "Intro" (feat. Snoop Dogg)
- 02. "Do What I Do" (feat. Uncle Chucc & T. Lee)
- 03. "Myspace Rappers" (feat. Problem)
- 04. "Bounce, Rock, Skate" (feat. DJ Drama, DJ Quik, Kurupt & Snoop Dogg)
- 05. "End of My Jam"
- 06. "I'm Good" (feat. T. Lee & Problem)
- 07. "I'm Toe Up (Remix)" (feat. DJ Felli Fel, DJ Quik, Problem, Kurupt & Snoop Dogg)
- 08. "Hello" (feat. DJ Quik, Tone, J. Black & Kurupt)
- 09. "How The Gangstas Do" (feat. Snoop Dogg & J. Black)
- 10. "No Violence" (feat. Kurupt)
- 11. "Sit Back" (feat. La the Darkman & Willie the Kid)
- 12. "He's a Problem" (feat. Problem)
- 13. "Hater PSA"
- 14. "Haters" (feat. Uncle Chucc & T. Lee)
- 15. "Misunderstood" (feat. YN)
- 16. "Ridin' & Rollin'" (feat. Snoop Dogg, Problem & Scar)
- 17. "GT" (feat. T. Lee)
- 18. "Ridaman" (feat. Snoop Dogg)
- 19. "Be Like Me" (feat. T. Lee & Uncle Chucc)
- 20. "Stay Humble" (feat. J. Black & Uncle Chucc)

== 2009 ==
=== Johnny Cash - Johnny Cash Remixed ===
- 04. "I Walk the Line" (feat. Snoop Dogg)

=== Kurupt ===
- 00. "Build You Up, Tear You Down" (feat. Snoop Dogg & Soopafly)

=== DJ Ill Will & DJ Rockstar: Marleik - Perfect Timing ===
- 12. "Secret Crush"

=== DJ Quik & Kurupt - BlaQKout ===
- 11. "The Appeal" (Produced with DJ Quik)

=== Lil Bam - The G.R.I.N.D. ===
- 03. "Change The Hood" (feat. Marleik)

=== DJ Quik ===
- 00. "Blueline Family Runnin' Thangs" (feat. Terrace Martin)

=== Snoop Dogg - Malice n Wonderland ===
- 03. "2 Minute Warning"
- 09. "Upside Down" (feat. Nipsey Hussle & Problem) (Produced with Jason Martin)

== 2010 ==
=== Snoop Dogg ===
- 00. "ICU" (feat. Terrace Martin)

=== Kurupt - Streetlights ===
- 01. "Intro"
- 02. "I'm Burnt" (feat. Problem)
- 03. "Questions" (feat. Uncle Chucc)
- 04. "In Gotti We Trust" (feat. Xzibit)
- 05. "Face Down" (feat. Terrace Martin, Tone & J. Black) (Produced with Larrance Dopson)
- 07. "All That I Want" (feat. Snoop Dogg & J. Black)
- 08. "I'm Drunk" (feat. J. Black)
- 09. "Scrape" (feat. Terrace Martin, Virginia Slim & Big Tri)
- 11. "I'm The Man" (feat. J. Black)
- 12. "I'm Burnt (Remix)" (feat. Roscoe, Snoop Dogg & Problem)
- 13. "Streetlights" (feat. Tone)
- 14. "Bounce, Rock, Skate (Kurupted Mix)" (feat. DJ Drama, DJ Quik, Terrace Martin & Snoop Dogg)
- 00. "Murder Fitness" (feat. Terrace Martin)

=== Crazy Toones ===
- 00. "Frontline" (feat. WC)

=== Brandi Kane - The Dopeman's Daughter ===
- 17. "Keep It Close" (feat. Stacee Adamz & J. Black)

=== Frank Nitt - Jewels in my Backpack (EP) ===
- 01. "Zoned Out" (feat. Kurupt)
- 02. "Go Girl" (feat. Problem)
- 03. "H.A.T.E."
- 04. "Psychedelic Freaky Girl"
- 05. "L.O.V.E." (feat. DJ Quik & J. Black)
- 06. "HollyHood"

=== Terrace Martin - Here, My Dear ===
- 01. "Intro" (feat. Tiffany Hobbs)
- 02. "Love Prelude"
- 03. "Thing For You" (feat. Tone Trezure & J. Black)
- 04. "Interlude Terrace Martin & Devi Dev"
- 05. "Give Me Some of You" (feat. Kendrick Lamar)
- 06. "I Had No Idea" (feat. Kendrick Lamar)
- 07. "Show Her The Way" (feat. Kurupt, Lady G (Da Real Deal), Problem & Dom Kennedy)
- 08. "Hey Girl" (feat. Snoop Dogg & J. Black)
- 09. "Interlude Terrace Martin, Devi Dev & Charlie Wilson"
- 10. "Special" (feat. U-n-i & Charlie Wilson)
- 11. "Interlude Terrace Martin & Devi Dev"
- 12. "I'm Done" (feat. Problem & Nico)
- 13. "Cheat" (feat. Snoop Dogg & Problem)
- 14. "Interlude Terrace Martin & Devi Dev"
- 15. "KOO KOO CYCO LOCO " (feat. Bad Lucc & Tee Lee)
- 16. "Makings of You" (feat. Kurupt & Overdoz)
- 17. "Call Me" (feat. Chris Starr)
- 18. "Interlude Terrace Martin & Devi Dev"
- 19. "What You Won't Do For Love" (feat. Don Dolla)
- 20. "Roll Up" (feat. Wiz Khalifa & Overdoz)
- 21. "Expectations" (feat. Murs, Badd Lucc & Lovely Jean)
- 22. "Interlude Terrace Martin & Devi Dev"
- 23. "Here, My Dear"

== 2011 ==
=== Murs & Terrace Martin - Melrose ===
- 01. "We on Melrose"
- 02. "Fresh Kicks"
- 03. "It's No Surprise"
- 04. "We Got Something"
- 05. "She's a Prostitute"
- 06. "Ding Dong"
- 07. "Dandruff"
- 08. "Hoodrat Blues"
- 09. "She's a Loser"
- 10. "Thank You"
- 11. "Cheating on Me"
- 12. "Thing For You"
- 13. "Doin Me"
- 14. "Hand In The Sky"

=== Strong Arm Steady - Arms & Hammers ===
- 07. "Blow My Horn" (feat. Kurupt)
- 10. "On Point" (feat. Too Short)

=== Snoop Dogg - PuffPuffPassTuesdays ===
- 00. "Keep Going"

=== Terrace Martin - Terrace Martin & Devi Dev Present... The Sex EP ===
- 01. "Sex Intro" (feat. Hi-Tek & Kenneth Crouch)
- 02. "Sex Prelude" (feat. T. Lee)
- 03. "Never Stop Loving You" (feat. 9th Wonder)
- 04. "With You" (feat. J. Black & Apage)
- 05. "In The Sheets" (feat. Lloyd)
- 06. "Cum Baby" (feat. Wow Jones)
- 07. "All The Things" (feat. Kenneth Crouch)
- 08. "Him & Her (Interlude)"
- 09. "Climax" (feat. Problem)
- 10. "All This Love" (feat. Kenneth Crouch)
- 11. "2 Court" (feat. Ill Camile, J. Black * Kenneth Crouch)

=== Kendrick Lamar - Section.80 ===
- 15. "Ab-Soul's Outro" (feat. Ab-Soul)

=== Jay Rock - Follow Me Home ===
- 12. "Just Like Me" (feat. J. Black)
- 15. "M.O.N.E.Y." (feat. J. Black)

=== Game - Hoodmorning (No Typo) ===
- 08. "Out of Towner"

=== Glasses Malone - Beach Cruiser ===
- 15. "Feel Good Music" (feat. Latoya Williams)

=== Glasses Malone - The Electric Chair ===
- 29. "Just Another Day" (Bloc Boyz)

== 2012 ==
=== Kendrick Lamar - good kid, m.A.A.d city ===
- 08. "m.A.A.d city" (featuring MC Eiht) (produced with Sounwave & THC)
- 11. "Real" (featuring Anna Wise)

== 2013 ==
=== Snoop Lion - Reincarnated ===
- 10. "The Good Good" (featuring Iza) (produced with Kyle Townsend)

=== Talib Kweli - Prisoner of Conscious ===
- 14. "Favela Love" (featuring Seu Jorge)

=== Terrace Martin - 3ChordFold ===
- 01. "Ab-Soul's Intro" (featuring Ab-Soul)
- 02. "Triangle Ship" (featuring Kendrick Lamar) (produced with 9th Wonder)
- 03. "Get Away"
- 04. "Something Else" (featuring Problem) (produced with 9th Wonder)
- 05. "Over Time" (featuring Musiq Soulchild)
- 06. "No Wrong No Right" (featuring Robert Glasper and James Fauntleroy)
- 08. "Move On" (produced with 9th Wonder)
- 09. "Motivation" (featuring Wiz Khalifa and Brevi)
- 10. "Happy Home (Freeloader, Renter, Buyer)"
- 12. "You're the One" (featuring Ty Dolla $ign)
- 13. "I'm For Real" (featuring Snoop Dogg and Lalah Hathaway)
- 14. "Gone" (featuring Robert Glasper) (produced with Quincy Jones)

=== Stalley - Honest Cowboy ===
- 07. "NineteenEighty7" (featuring Schoolboy Q)

=== Robert Glasper Experiment - Black Radio 2 ===
- 07. "Persevere" (featuring Snoop Dogg, Lupe Fiasco and Luke James) (produced with Robert Glasper)

== 2014 ==
=== Various Artists - 9th Wonder Presents: Jamla Is the Squad ===
- 14. Terrace Martin - "Shinin' Star" (produced with 9th Wonder)

=== Courtney Noelle - Love on the Run ===
- 09. "You Got Me" (featuring Wiz Khalifa)

=== YG - My Krazy Life ===
- 09. "Really Be (Smokin N Drinkin)" (featuring Kendrick Lamar) (produced with Ty Dolla $ign and Chordz)
- 14. "Sorry Momma" (featuring Ty Dolla $ign) (produced with DJ Mustard)

=== Terrace Martin - 3ChordFold Pulse ===
- 01. "Pulse" (featuring Preston Harris)
- 02. "It's Yours" (featuring Robert Glasper, James Fauntleroy and Thundercat)
- 03. "You and Me" (featuring Preston Harris)
- 04. "Lets Go Get Stoned" (featuring Snoop Dogg and Tone Trezure)
- 05. "Come and Get Me" (featuring Wyann Vaughn)
- 06. "Poetic Justice (Live In New York)" (Kendrick Lamar)
- 07. "All The Things" (ft. Don Dolla)
- 08. "Angel" (featuring 9th Wonder) (produced with 9th Wonder)
- 09. "Never Have 2 Worry (Live In New York)" (Snoop Dogg featuring Uncle Chucc)
- 10. "The Last Song" (featuring Teedra Moses)
- 11. "Alrite" (featuring J. Black)
- 12. "Beautiful" (featuring Wyann Vaughn and Preston Harris)
- 13. "Butterfly (Live)" (featuring Robert Glasper, Ethan Farmer, Craig Brockman, Maroln Willia and Ronald Bruner)

=== Ab-Soul - These Days... ===
- 09. "Kendrick Lamar's Interlude" (featuring Kendrick Lamar)

=== Big K.R.I.T. - Cadillactica ===
- 13. "Angels"

== 2015 ==
=== Kendrick Lamar - To Pimp a Butterfly ===
- 02. "For Free? (Interlude)"
- 03. "King Kunta" (produced with Sounwave)
- 05. "These Walls" (featuring Bilal, Anna Wise and Thundercat) (produced with Larrance Dopson and Sounwave)
- 08. "For Sale? (Interlude)" (produced with Taz Arnold AKA Ti$A and Sounwave)
- 12. "Complexion (A Zulu Love)" (featuring Rapsody) (produced with Thundercat, Sounwave and Antydote)
- 13. "The Blacker the Berry" (produced with Boi-1da and KOZ)

=== YG - Still Brazy ===
- 05. "Twist My Fingaz"
- 11. "Bool, Balm & Bollective"

=== Travis Scott - Rodeo ===
- 14. "Apple Pie" (co-produced with Travis Scott, Mike Dean and 1500 or Nothin')

=== Lalah Hathaway ===
- "Ghetto Boy" (Remix) (featuring Snoop Dogg)

== 2016 ==
=== Kendrick Lamar - Untitled Unmastered ===
- 05. “untitled 05|09.21.2014”

== 2017 ==
=== Kendrick Lamar - Damn ===
- 06. "Loyalty" (featuring Rihanna) (produced with DJ Dahi, Sounwave and Anthony Tiffith)

=== Overdoz - 2008 ===
- 04. "House Party"
- 10. "ULETTHEHOMIEHIT

=== Problem - Selfish ===
- 09. "Ain't Like You" (featuring Ne-Yo & Terrace Martin)

== 2018 ==
=== alt-J - Reduxer ===
- 07. "Last Year" (featuring GoldLink) (Terrace Martin Remix)

== 2020 ==
=== Busta Rhymes - Extinction Level Event 2: The Wrath of God ===
- 11. "Master Fard Muhammad" (featuring Rick Ross) (produced with Hi-Tek)

== 2024 ==
=== Kendrick Lamar - GNX ===
- 08. "Dodger Blue" (featuring Wallie the Sensei, Siete7x and Roddy Ricch) (credited as an additional producer)

== Film Soundtrack ==
Song	Year	Album	Co-Artist(s)
"Underdog"	2025	F1 the Album	D.A. Got That Dope
