= Morgan Stone =

Morgan Stone was a pioneer in the mainstream growth of the Action Sports. By the age of 25, he had co-created/produced Paved New World the first action sports and music lifestyle series that aired on ESPN, and the created one of the first multi-sport half-pipe tour for Six Flags during their annual spring break out, called Dare to Air featuring such stars as Tony Hawk and Dave Mirra, in 1993 and 1994, for McCann Erickson.

Stone later served as a creative consultant / shooter / producer for Winter and Summer X Games, the MTV Sports and Music Festivals, and national commercial clients including AT&T and Mountain Dew. In 2000 Stone was recruited to organize, manage and operate 900 Films for Tony Hawk. Stone served as president of 900 Films until 2004. At 900 Films, Stone produced many successful entertainment projects, including ESPN’s first reality based show Tony Hawk’s Gigantic Skatepark Tour which ran for 3 years, co-created and directed Tony Hawk’s Boom Boom Huck Jam national arena tour, and served as Executive Producer on Warner Bros. 2003 summer comedy feature film “Grind".

From 2004 to 2012, Stone has worked as a freelance producer for numerous corporate, commercial and entertainment clients, developing television pilots, producing award-winning campaigns for Station Casinos, Inc. (Green Valley Ranch & the launching commercial spot for Red Rock Casino), and music videos for Hip Hop Legend Snoop Dogg, including: “Candy”, "My Medicine", "Those Gurlz", and "Singh Is Kinng".

In 2013, Stone was recruited to Berlin, Germany and was tasked with designing and building a live streaming TV quality studio, capable of producing daily content focused on professional eSports. It successfully launched in 2014 producing 2 hours of daily eSport related gaming content with over 6 million views in the first 3 months.

In 2016, Stone returned stateside to work as in-house executive producer at Red Bull Media House to run the US side of a new daily “magazine-style” episodic showcasing the programming airing on a soon to be launching 24 hr RBTV network.

== Sources ==
- https://web.archive.org/web/20120229213140/http://www.videostatic.com/vs/2008/07/if-snoop-dogg-c.html<morgan stone>
- http://www.boomboomhuckjam.com/bbhjhistory.html
- https://www.youtube.com/watch?v=lkFDSZ6PzNU
- https://web.archive.org/web/20110207112439/http://cigapictures.com/Home.swf
- https://www.youtube.com/user/frontdeskllc
- http://www.priceminister.es/offer/buy/21745394/Tony-Hawk-s-Boom-Boom-Huck-Jam-North-American-Tour.html
