= Doggumentary =

Studio album by Snoop Dogg
- Released: March 29, 2011
- Recorded: 2010–2011
- Genres: Hip-hop; gangsta rap
- Length: 79:44
- Labels: Doggy Style; Capitol; Priority
- Producers: Snoop Dogg (exec.); Jake One; Battlecat; Rick Rock; DJ Khalil; Lex Luger (music producer); Fredwreck; T-Pain; the Cataracs; Scoop DeVille; Gorillaz; Mr. Porter; Warryn Campbell; David Banner; Meech Wells; Scott Storch; Willie Nelson; Ric Rude; David Guetta; Kanye West

Snoop Dogg chronology
Malice n Wonderland (2009)	Doggumentary (2011)	Mac & Devin Go to High School (2011)

Singles from Doggumentary
- 1. "Wet" Released: December 17, 2010; 2. "Boom" Released: March 8, 2011

Doggumentary is the eleventh studio album by American West Coast hip hop recording artist Snoop Dogg. It was released on March 29, 2011, on the Priority Records record label. The album was produced by Battlecat, The Cataracs, Gorillaz, David Banner, THX, DJ Khalil, Fredwreck, Jake One, David Guetta, Mike Dean, Jeff Bhasker, Lex Luger, Meech Wells, Mr. Porter, Rick Rock, Rick Rude, Scoop DeVille, Scott Storch, Warryn Campbell, Kanye West, DJ Reflex, among others.

It was supported by the singles "Wet" and "Boom".

Doggumentary received mixed reviews from most critics. The album debuted at number eight on the US Billboard 200. The album serves as the follow-up to Snoop's tenth studio album Malice n Wonderland (2009).

== Background ==
Snoop Dogg first announced that he was working on a sequel to his 1993 debut album Doggystyle during a studio session with Hip hop producer and rapper Swizz Beatz. The two stated they knocked out eighteen tracks and Snoop ended the video out saying he gave him some gangsta tracks, some R&B tracks and some Hip Hop tracks. Snoop Dogg called off plans to release the sequel to his classic debut Doggystyle, instead opting for the title Doggumentary Music for his 11th studio album, set for release in March 2011 on Priority/EMI Records. "I have been in the game for so long and still have the same passion I did when I first started. I want my fans to ride with me on this one and know that I am so focused on bringing good music to them," explained the veteran MC. "It's called Doggumentary Music because this is my life and I want to share my music, and my process of making it, with the fans."

== Recording and artwork ==
Rap-Up reported that Snoop Dogg has recorded with Wiz Khalifa on a track, titled “This Weed Iz Mine.” The smokers’ anthem is scheduled to appear on Snoop's 11th studio album Doggumentary Music, along with the Scoop DeVille-produced lead single “New Year's Eve and with other songs including “Rollin’ in My Malibu,” “Oh Boy,” and collaborations with Lil Jon and Swizz Beatz. The rapper announced plans to work with Katy Perry again after the pair's number one single "California Gurls" stating, "We're trying to get together and do something on my new album...so [I'm] definitely in contact with her." Snoop told OK! magazine about Perry, "She's a sweet girl, and I had fun making the record with her. Like I said, I'm looking forward to her being on my record as well." Snoop Dogg also recorded with Damon Albarn's animated alternative hip hop group Gorillaz. The song is reportedly left over from the Plastic Beach sessions, in which Snoop collaborated on the track "Welcome to the World of the Plastic Beach" Snoop said about the collaboration: "We did that record in London, England at their studio. The track made me wanna' sing & have fun & what not I don't give a fuck, it's like maybe I can smoke witchu' maybe I can't, you know what I'm saying?" Snoop Dogg revealed to MTV that he was looking to get a Britney Spears duet for the album. On November 27, 2010, Snoop Dogg was in the studio with producer David Banner who produced two beats for him.

The artwork shows a chair with Snoop Dogg's name above and the album title below.

On December 8, 2010, Snoop Dogg reported to Complex magazine that featured artists will include Daz Dillinger, Too Short, Bootsy Collins, Kokane, Ne-Yo, Marty James, Pilot, Gorillaz, John Legend, Trey Songz, Wiz Khalifa, and LaToiya Williams with production on the album from Scoop DeVille, Jake One, Fredwreck, the Cataracs, David Guetta, J-Kwon, Gorillaz, Denaun Porter, Warryn Campbell, David Banner, Meech Wells, Kanye West, Black Mob, Trylogy, and Rick Rude.

However, on February 9, 2011, EMI released a poster that announced some of the guests, which included Kanye West, Wiz Khalifa, Gorillaz, R. Kelly, T-Pain, Young Jeezy, E-40, and more. The producers include Kanye West, Lex Luger, Scott Storch, David Guetta, the Cataracs, Battlecat, Fredwreck, and more.

== Release and promotion ==
Snoop Dogg announced via Twitter that he would be joining the ranks of emcees Kanye West, Timbaland, Crooked I, and the many prior who released weekly songs in preparation for upcoming projects. Dubbed "Puff Puff Pass Tuesdays," Snoop plans to release a new song each week starting January 11, 2011 (with song "El Lay"), until the release of his album.

== Reception ==
Professional ratings
Aggregate scores
Source	Rating
Metacritic	58/100
Review scores
Source	Rating
AllMusic	3/5 stars
Dotmusic	2/10
The Guardian	3/5 stars
HipHopDX	2.5/5 stars
Los Angeles Times	3/4 stars
Pitchfork	5.5/10
RapReviews	7/10
Rolling Stone	2.5/5 stars
Slant Magazine	2/5 stars
Spin	5/10

Doggumentary received mixed reviews from most music critics. At Metacritic, which assigns a normalized rating out of 100 to reviews from mainstream critics, the album received an average score of 58, based on 15 reviews, which indicates "mixed or average reviews". Rave Magazine gave it two-and-a-half stars.

== Commercial performance ==
Doggumentary debuted at number eight on the US Billboard 200 chart, selling 50,000 copies in its first week, marking the fourth highest debut of the week. It serves as Snoop Dogg's eleventh top-ten album in the United States. The album dropped to the number 35 in its second week, selling an additional 14,000 units. In its third week, the album selling 7,800 copies, for a third-week total of 72,000 units.

== Singles ==
"New Year's Eve" was the first official promotional single released from Doggumentary, it was released on November 5, 2010, on the iTunes Store. The track peaked on the Hot R&B/Hip-Hop Songs at number 66. The song features American singer and songwriter Marty James and is produced by Scoop DeVille, producer of Snoop's 2009 single "I Wanna Rock". It did not however make the final cut of the album.

"Wet" the first official lead single from the album. The song was recorded specifically for Prince William's bachelor's party. Snoop's spokespeople bill the song as a sequel to 2007's "Sexual Eruption." Produced by the Cataracs of Far East Movement fame, Snoop spoke of the gift “When I heard the royal family wanted to have me perform in celebration of Prince William's marriage, I knew I had to give them a little something." He continued, “’Wet’ is the perfect anthem for Prince William or any playa to get the club smokin’." The song was released on iTunes on December 17, 2010. The edited version, entitled "Sweat" will be released to US urban radio stations on January 11, 2011. The single entered the Hot R&B/Hip-Hop Songs at number 57, it charted at number 25 on the Hot Rap Tracks chart. The official remix, featuring Jim Jones and Shawty Lo, was released on February 8, 2011, as a part of Snoop Dogg's Puff Puff Pass Tuesdays giveaway.

"Gangbang Rookie" was the second official promotional single from the album. The track features rapper Pilot and was released to the iTunes Store on January 14, 2011. The single was produced by Jake One.

"Platinum" was the third official promotional single from the album. The track features singer R. Kelly and was released to the iTunes Store on February 22, 2011. The single was produced by Lex Luger. Snoop Dogg revealed to MTV about the collaboration "I think me and Kells understand who we are and what we do to make each other better," Snoop said. "He has a deep love for music, and sometimes he goes over the head of the people that's listening just like myself, because we're too in-depth with music. We don't just listen to our genre. We find ourselves enjoying all walks of music." The song, however, almost didn't make the final cut, as Snoop had finished up recording the album. Snoop's friend previewed the Lex Luger track for the rapper, which impressed him enough to jot down a few bars. After sending his sketch to Kelly, the crooner replied with his own rough demo, leading the pair to finally complete the record.

"Boom" featuring singer T-Pain is the second official lead single from the album. Produced by Scott Storch the song features samples from 1980s’ hit Situation by Yazoo. The song was released in the iTunes Store on March 8, 2011, with the video set for release that same day. The single entered the Billboard Hot 100 at number 76.

Snoop Dogg has filmed seven more music videos for the album. The seven include one with guest rappers E-40 and Young Jeezy for "My Fuckin' House", a video with singer/producer Mr. Porter, the producer and featured artist for the song "My Own Way", one with rapper Pilot for "Gangbang Rookie", another with rapper Wiz Khalifa for "This Weed Iz Mine", one for "El Lay" featuring Marty James, an animated video for "Take U Home", featuring Too Short, Kokane, and Daz Dillinger, and a video for Snoop's song "The Way Life Used to Be".

== Track listing ==
No.	Title	Writer(s)	Producer(s)	Length
1.	"Toyz n da Hood" (featuring Bootsy Collins)	Calvin Cordozar Broadus, Jr.; George Clinton; Jacob Dutton; Phillip Walker; William Earl Collins	Jake One	2:40
2.	"The Way Life Used to Be"	Brian Holland; Broadus; Denzil Foster; Edward Holland, Jr.; Jay King; Kevin Gilliam; Lamont Herbert Dozier; Luther Ronzoni Vandross; Samuel Cooke; Thomas McElroy; William Henry Marcus Miller Jr.	Battlecat	3:43
3.	"My Own Way" (featuring Mr. Porter)	Armond Davis; Broadus; Denaun Porter; Tony Jackson	Mr. Porter	3:05
4.	"Wonder What It Do" (featuring Uncle Chucc)	Broadus; David Frank Paich; Charles Hamilton; Christian Gold; Gilliam; Kenton Nix; Michael Lawrence Denne; William Royce Scaggs	Battlecat	3:43
5.	"My Fucn House" (featuring Young Jeezy and E-40)	Broadus; Earl Stevens; Jay Wayne Jenkins	Rick Rock	5:07
6.	"Peer Pressure" (featuring Traci Nelson)	Broadus; Farid Karam Nassar; Leslie Sample; Tracie Nelson; Wilbur H. Jennings	Fredwreck	4:07
7.	"I Don't Need No Bitch" (featuring Devin the Dude and Kobe Honeycutt)	Brian Honeycutt; Broadus; Daniel Tannenbaum; Devin Copeland; Malik Jones; Khalil Abdul-Rahman; Terence Harden	DJ Khalil	3:59
8.	"Platinum" (featuring R. Kelly)	Broadus; Lexus Arnel Lewis; Robert Sylvester Kelly	Lex Luger	4:29
9.	"Boom" (featuring T-Pain)	Broadus; Faheem Rasheed Najm; Geneviève Alison Jane Moyet; Scott Storch; Vincent John Martin	Scott Storch	3:50
10.	"We Rest n Cali" (featuring Goldie Loc and Bootsy Collins)	Broadus; Collins; Keiwan Deshawn Spillman; Larry Troutman; Porter; Roger Troutman	Mr. Porter	4:10
11.	"El Lay" (featuring Marty James)	Broadus; Elijah Blue Molina; Marty James	Scoop DeVille	4:07
12.	"Gangbang Rookie" (featuring Pilot)	Broadus; Devlin Williams; Dutton; Jones; Michael Morgan	Jake One	3:46
13.	"This Weed Iz Mine" (featuring Wiz Khalifa)	Andre Booth; Broadus; Chad Bromley; Cameron Jibril Thomaz; Molina; Ryan Patrick Maginn	Scoop DeVille	3:43
14.	"Wet"	Broadus; David Benjamin, Niles Hollowell-Dhar	The Cataracs	3:45
15.	"Take U Home" (featuring Too $hort, Kokane, and Daz Dillinger)	Broadus; Cecil D. Womack, Jr.; Delmar Drew Arnaud; Jerry B. Long, Jr.; Sean Kenney; Todd Anthony Shaw	Meech Wells	3:55
16.	"Sumthin Like This Night" (featuring Gorillaz)	Broadus; Damon Albarn	Gorillaz	3:37
17.	"Superman" (featuring Willie Nelson)	Broadus; Willie Hugh Nelson	Willie Nelson	2:05
18.	"Eyez Closed" (featuring John Legend and Kanye West)	Broadus; James Bromley Spicer; Jacob Martin; John Stephens; Kanye West; Russell Wendell Simmons	Kanye West; Jeff Bhasker; Mike Dean (add.)	5:02
19.	"Raised in da Hood"	Broadus; Dino Hawkins; Eric Vidal, Nicholas Vidal; Harden; Troutman; Warryn Campbell	Warryn Campbell; DJ Reflex (co.)	3:39
20.	"It's D Only Thang"	Broadus; Christopher Goodman; Lavell William Crump	David Banner; THX (co.); Crane	3:16
21.	"Cold Game" (featuring Latoiya Williams)	Broadus; Latoiya Williams; Claude B. Cave, Carlos D. Wilson, Louis W. Wilson, Ricardo A. Wilson; Roger Thomas; Robert Lewis	Ric Rude	3:49
Total length:				79:44

iTunes pre-order bonus track
No.	Title	Writer(s)	Producer(s)	Length
22.	"Sweat" (David Guetta Remix) (removed from edited version)	Broadus; Benjamin; Hollowell-Dhar	David Guetta; The Cataracs	3:16

United Kingdom edition
No.	Title	Writer(s)	Producer(s)	Length
14.	"Wet" (David Guetta Remix)	Broadus; Benjamin; Hollowell-Dhar	David Guetta; The Cataracs	3:16

• (co.) Co-producer
• (add.) Additional production

Sample credits

- "Toyz N Da Hood" contains samples of "(Not Just) Knee Deep", written by George Clinton and Philippé Wynne.
- "The Way Life Used to Be" contains samples of "Why You Treat Me So Bad" written by Jay King, Thomas McElroy and Denzil Foster and performed by Club Nouveau; "Bad Boy (Having a Party)" written by Sam Cooke, Luther Vandross and Marcus Miller; "Reflections" written by Lamont Dozier, Brian Holland and Eddie Holland, and performed by The Supremes; and features excerpts of "The Way Life Used to Be" performed by Luther Vandross
- "Wonder What It Do" contains interpolations of "Oh Honey" written by Ken Gold and Michael Lawrence Denne; "Lowdown" written by David Paich and William Scaggs and performed by Boz Scaggs; and "Heart Beat" written by Kenton Nix.
- "Peer Pressure" contains interpolations of "Street Life" written by Will Jennings and Leslie Sample.
- "Boom" contains interpolations of "Situation" written by Geneviève Alison Jane Moyet and Vincent John Martin, and performed by Yazoo.
- "We Rest N Cali" contains samples of "Heartbreaker" written by Larry Troutman and Roger Troutman, and performed by Zapp.
- "This Weed Iz Mine" contains samples of "This Beat Is Mine" written by Andre Booth, and performed by Vicky D.
- "Eyez Closed" contains samples of "Money (Dollar Bill Y'all)", written by James Bromley Spicer and Russell Simmons, and performed by Jimmy Spicer.
- "Raised In da Hood" contains samples of "Pistol Grip Bump" written by Eric & Nick Vidal, Dino D. Hawkins and Roger Troutman, and performed by Volume 10.
- "Cold Game" contains samples and excerpts of "Gilly Hines (In Memory of Natalie Cerame)" written by Claude B. Cave, Carlos D. Wilson, Louis W. Wilson, Ricardo A. Wilson, and performed by Mandrill.

== Personnel ==
Credits for Doggumentary adapted from Allmusic.

=== Musicians ===
- Bad Lucc – vocals
- Calvin Broadus – composer
- Stephen Bruner – bass
- Antone "Chooky" Caldwell – bass
- George Clinton – composer
- Sam Cooke – composer
- Matthew Desantis, Jr. – vocals
- Dev – vocals
- DJ Pooh – vocals
- Lamont Dozier – composer
- Mamie Gunn – vocals
- Will Hamm – vocals
- Brian Holland – composer
- Eddie Holland – composer
- R. Kelly – composer
- Belinda Lipscomb – vocals
- Mickey Raphael – harmonica
- Amber Sibbett – vocals
- Larry Troutman – composer
- Roger Troutman – composer
- Luther Vandross – composer
- Kayla Waggoner – vocals
- LaToiya Williams – vocals

=== Technical personnel ===
- Deegan Mack Adams – engineer
- Tony Allen – drums
- David Banner – producer
- Dave Benck – assistant engineer
- Jeff Bhasker – keyboards
- Big Jerm – engineer
- Warryn "Baby Dubb" Campbell – producer
- The Cataracs – producer
- Mike Chav – engineer
- Ted Chung – engineer
- Bootsy Collins – drums, engineer, vocal arrangement
- Todd Cooper – engineer
- Devin Copeland – engineer
- Jason Cox – engineer
- Armond "Bamm" Davis – keyboards
- Andrew Dawson – engineer
- Daz – engineer
- Mike Dean – engineer, mixing
- Hector Delgado – engineer
- Scoop DeVille – producer
- DJ Battlecat – keyboards, mixing, percussion, producer, sound effects, talk box
- DJ Khalil – producer
- DJ Quik – mixing
- DJ Reflex – producer
- Toby Donohue – engineer
- Abel Garibaldi – engineer
- Noah Goldstein – engineer
- Gordon Groothedde – engineer
- Gorillaz – producer
- Richard Huredia – mixing
- Chris Jackson – mixing
- Tony "56" Jackson – keyboards
- Jake One – producer
- Danny Keyz – keyboards
- Anthony Kilhoffer – engineer
- Aaron "Lefty" Kimmerer – engineer
- Dennis Krinjen – assistant engineer
- Shon Lawon – engineer
- Sven Lens – engineer
- Ari Levine – mixing
- Lexus "Lex Luger" Lewis – producer
- David "Dizmix" Lopez – engineer
- Fabian Marasciullo – mixing
- Travis "Shaggy" Marshall – engineer
- Kenny McCloud – mixing
- Ian Mereness – engineer
- Alex Merzin – mixing
- Morris Mingo – keyboards
- Mr. Porter – mixing, producer
- "Fredwreck" Farid Nassar – guitar, keyboards, mixing, moog synthesizer, producer
- Willie Nelson – guitar
- Matt Price – engineer
- Khalil Abdul Rahman – drum programming, engineer, keyboards
- Erik "Mr. E." Ramos – engineer
- Erik Reichers – mixing
- James Reynolds – mixing
- Rick Rock – mixing, producer
- Ric Rude – engineer, producer
- Jason Schweitzer – mixing
- Stephen Sedgwick – engineer
- Snoop Dogg – executive producer
- Nico Solis – engineer
- Soopafly – mixing
- Scott Storch – producer
- THX – producer
- Truck Turner – engineer
- Javier Valverde – engineer
- Roel Verberk – engineer
- Vic Wainstein – engineer
- Meech Wells – producer
- Soul Mechanix – producer
- Kanye West – composer, producer
- Zoe A. Young – production coordinator
- Brian "Big Bass" Gardner – Mastering Engineer
- The Water Boyz – remix

== Charts ==
=== Weekly charts ===
Chart (2011)	Peak position
Australian Albums (ARIA)	12
Belgian Albums (Ultratop Flanders)	41
Belgian Albums (Ultratop Wallonia)	30
Canadian Albums (Billboard)	28
Dutch Albums (Album Top 100)	45
French Albums (SNEP)	36
German Albums (Offizielle Top 100)	44
New Zealand Albums (RMNZ)	35
Norwegian Albums (VG-lista)	36
Scottish Albums (Official Charts)	52
Swiss Albums (Schweizer Hitparade)	16
UK Albums (Official Charts Company)	44
UK R&B Albums (Official Charts Company)	5
US Billboard 200	8
US Top R&B/Hip-Hop Albums (Billboard)	4
US Top Rap Albums (Billboard)	2

=== Year-end charts ===
Chart (2011)	Position
US Top R&B/Hip-Hop Albums	64
