= My Medicine =

My Medicine may refer to:

- "My Medicine" (song), a 2008 song by Snoop Dogg
- "My Medicine", a song by The Pretty Reckless from the 2010 album Light Me Up
- My Medicine, a 2002 album by Wilt, or its title song
