= Think break =

1972 drum break and sample

"Yeah! Woo!"
The "Think break" as heard on the original single, "Think (About It)", looped and followed by the subsequent lyric

The Think break is a drum break that has been widely sampled in popular music. It comes from the 1972 song "Think (About It)" by the American funk and soul singer Lyn Collins, written and produced by James Brown. The drum break was performed by Jabo Starks.

== Background and impact ==
In 1987, "Think (About It)" was featured on the 16th volume of the drum break compilation Ultimate Breaks and Beats, a highly popular series among hip-hop record producers. That year marked the first known use of the "Woo! Yeah!" break, when the Beatmasters, an English electronic music group, sampled the break for Cookie Crew's song "Females (Get On Up)". While "Females" was a minor hit in the UK, the break did not receive major airplay and attention until the following year, when it was used as the backing loop for the 1988 song "It Takes Two" by Rob Base & DJ E-Z Rock. The song, which is almost entirely composed of sampled parts from "Think (About It)", became a platinum-selling hit.

In addition to the famous "Yeah! Woo!" sample, another part of the drum break has seen prominent use in songs of diverse breakbeat subgenres such as jungle, drum and bass and breakcore. The sample contains a short, ad-libbed shout by one of the musicians, and is usually played at a higher speed, giving the shout a very recognizable character.

== See also ==
- Amen break
- Breakbeat
- Breakcore
- Ultimate Breaks and Beats
