= Malice n Wonderland =

Studio album by Snoop Dogg
- Released: December 8, 2009
- Recorded: January–September 2009
- Genre: Hip hop
- Length: 54:04
- Label: Doggystyle; Capitol; Priority
- Producer: B-Don; Battlecat; Cool & Dre; Danja; Jason Martin; J. R. Rotem; J.U.S.T.I.C.E. League; Lil Jon; Nottz; PMG; Scoop DeVille; Scott Storch; Snoop Dogg; Super Ced; Teddy Riley; Tha Bizness; The Runners; The Neptunes; Terrace Martin; Tricky Stewart

Snoop Dogg chronology
Ego Trippin' (2008)	Malice n Wonderland (2009)	Doggumentary (2011)

Singles from Malice n Wonderland
- 1. "Gangsta Luv" Released: October 6, 2009; 2. "I Wanna Rock" Released: November 17, 2009

Malice n Wonderland is the tenth studio album by American rapper Snoop Dogg; it was released on December 8, 2009, by Doggystyle Records, Capitol Records and Priority Records. Production for the album took place from January 2009 to September 2009 at several recording studios and the production was handled by Battlecat, The-Dream, Tricky Stewart, The Neptunes, Teddy Riley, Lil Jon and Terrace Martin.

The album debuted at number 23 on the US Billboard 200 chart, selling 61,000 copies in its first week. Upon its release, Malice n Wonderland received generally mixed to positive reviews from music critics.

== Background ==
The album was originally planned to be released through a distribution deal with MTV, after his departure with Interscope Records. In 2009, Priority Records announced that Snoop Dogg was appointed creative chairman of Priority Records and the label also announced plans to release his tenth studio album on the label.

The album consists of fourteen tracks and features production from Teddy Riley, Nottz, The Neptunes, The-Dream, and Terrace Martin. Guest features include R. Kelly, Soulja Boy Tell 'Em, and Brandy.

Doggystyle Records president and Snoopadelic Films president Ted Chung, Snoop shooting a mini-movie to accompany the album (similar to his 1994 short film/soundtrack Murder Was the Case), portraying him as a "super gangster".

== Reception ==
Professional ratings
Aggregate scores
Source	Rating
Metacritic	61/100
Review scores
Source	Rating
AllMusic	4/5 stars
Entertainment Weekly	B−
Mojo	3/5 stars
musicOMH	4/5 stars
Now	4/5 stars
PopMatters	4/10
Q	3/5 stars
RapReviews	7.5/10
Slant Magazine	2.5/5 stars
The Source	4/5 stars

Malice n Wonderland was received with generally mixed to positive reviews, with Metacritic giving it 61 out of 100. The Smoking Section said "[Snoop's] one-of-a-kind flow and the knowledge of how to actually craft an enjoyable record will likely continue to serve as one of premiere blueprints in Hip-Hop."

== Singles ==
"Gangsta Luv" featuring The-Dream, was released as the album's lead single on October 6, 2009. The song was produced by American producers, The-Dream and Tricky Stewart, one of two such productions on the album.

The album's second single "That's tha Homie", was released for digital download on November 3, 2009.

The album's third single "I Wanna Rock" was released for digital download on November 17, 2009.

The album's fourth single, "Pronto" featuring Soulja Boy, was released for digital download on December 1, 2009.

== Promotion ==
Snoop Dogg hosted WWE Raw on October 19, 2009, to promote Malice n Wonderland.

== Commercial performance ==
Malice n Wonderland debuted at number 23 on the US Billboard 200, selling 61,000 copies in its opening week. It is his first album since Paid tha Cost to Be da Boss (2002) not to reach the top ten on the Billboard 200, his lowest charting album on the US R&B/Hip-Hop charts and his only album to miss the British and Australian Top 100. Malice n Wonderland has sold over 400,000 copies in the United States as of 2011.

== Track listing ==
Credits adapted from the album's liner notes.

No.	Title	Writer(s)	Producer(s)	Length
1.	"Intro"	Calvin Broadus	Snoop Dogg	0:14
2.	"I Wanna Rock"	Broadus; Elijah Molina; Robert Ginyard Jr.	Scoop DeVille	3:56
3.	"2 Minute Warning"	Broadus; Terrace Martin	Terrace Martin	1:53
4.	"1800" (featuring Lil Jon)	Broadus; Jonathan Smith; Kevin Randolph	Lil Jon	3:35
5.	"Different Languages" (featuring Jazmine Sullivan)	Broadus; Jazmine Sullivan; Molina; Teddy Riley	Teddy Riley; Scoop DeVille; PMG (co.)	4:44
6.	"Gangsta Luv" (featuring The-Dream)	Broadus; Terius Nash; Christopher Stewart	Tricky Stewart; The-Dream	4:16
7.	"Pronto" (featuring Soulja Boy)	Broadus; DeAndre Way; Brandon Matthews	B-Don; Super Ced (co.)	4:57
8.	"That's Tha Homie"	Broadus; Floyd Hills; Marcella Araica	Danja	5:43
9.	"Upside Down" (featuring Nipsey Hussle & Problem)	Broadus; T. Martin; Jason Martin; Ermias Asghedom	Terrace Martin; Jason Martin (co.)	4:44
10.	"Secrets" (featuring Kokane)	Broadus; Kevin Gilliam; Jerry Long; Andre Edwards; George Canler; Jimmy Marinos; Wally Palmar; Mike Skill; Peter Solley	Battlecat	4:53
11.	"Pimpin Ain't EZ" (featuring R. Kelly)	Broadus; Robert Kelly; Dominick Lamb; Ronald LaPread; Lionel Richie	Nottz	4:12
12.	"Luv Drunk" (featuring The-Dream)	Broadus; Nash; Stewart	Tricky Stewart; The-Dream	3:55
13.	"Special" (featuring Brandy & Pharrell)	Broadus; Pharrell Williams	The Neptunes	5:26
14.	"Outro"	Broadus	Snoop Dogg	1:31
15.	"Bootiez Automatic (iTunes exclusive bonus)"		Snoop Dogg	3:27

• (co.) Co-producer

Sample credits

- "I Wanna Rock" contains elements and samples from "It Takes Two" as performed by Rob Base and DJ E-Z Rock and "Think About It" as performed by Lyn Collins.
- "Secrets" contains interpolations from "Talking in Your Sleep" as performed by The Romantics.
- "Pimpin Ain't EZ" elements and samples from "Zoom" as performed by The Commodores.

== Personnel ==
Credits for Malice n Wonderland adapted from Allmusic.

=== Musicians ===
- Misty Anderson - background vocals
- Bokie - vocals
- Soulja Boy - vocals
- Brandy - vocals
- Shante Broadus - vocals, background vocals
- Dee Dimes - background vocals
- DJ Ez Dick - vocals
- Bryce Doherty - background vocals
- The-Dream - vocals, producer
- Eric Eylands - background vocals
- Andrew Gouche - bass
- Dustin Hess - bass guitar
- Nipsey Hussle - vocals
- Holli Joyce Ivory - background vocals
- R. Kelly - vocals
- Kokane - vocals
- Trevor Lawrence - percussion
- Cha'nelle Lewis - background vocals
- Bokie Loc - vocals
- Terrace Martin - accordion, arranger, keyboards, mixing, producer, saxophone
- Rona Mercado - background vocals
- Problem - vocals
- Kevin Randolph - keyboards
- Tricky Stewart - producer
- T'yana Shani Stewart - background vocals
- Jazmine Sullivan - vocals
- Marlon Williams - guitar
- Pharrell Williams - vocals
- Mansur Zafr - keyboards

=== Production ===
- Lucky Alvarez - design, layout
- Marcella "Ms. Lago" Araica - mixing
- B-Don - producer
- Jason Bale - assistant engineer
- Battlecat - mixing, producer
- Mike Bozzi - assistant
- Aaron "A-Game" Brunson - keyboard programming
- Smith Carlson - assistant
- Ted Chung - assistant, engineer
- Andrew Coleman - digital editing, engineer
- Danja - producer
- Scoop DeVille - producer
- Dr. Dre - mixing
- Shon Don - engineer
- Caliph Gamble - engineer
- Brian Gardner - mastering
- Abel Garibaldi - engineer
- Tasha Hayward - hair stylist
- Mauricio Iragorri - mixing
- Chris Jackson - A&R, engineer
- Jaycen Joshua - mixing
- Sam Kalandijan - engineer
- Justin Keitt - engineer, vocal arrangement
- Keke - production coordination
- Kori Lewis - assistant
- Justin Li - A&R
- Lil Jon - vocals, mixing, producer
- Giancarlo Lino - mixing assistant
- Deborah Mannis-Gardner - sample clearance
- Fabian Marasciullo - mixing
- Jason Martin - producer
- Ian Mereness - engineer
- Mister Cartoon - cover art
- Luis Navarro - assistant engineer
- The Neptunes - producer
- Nottz - producer
- Estevan Oriol - photography and design
- Erik "Mr. E." Ramos - engineer
- Erik Reichers - mixing
- Robert Reyes - assistant engineer
- Teddy Riley - producer
- Ramon Rivas - assistant
- April Roomet - wardrobe
- Marcus Rutledge - engineer
- Edward "Poeted" Sanders Jr. - assistant
- Constance Schwartz - marketing
- Ray Seay - mixing
- Kelly Sheehan - engineer
- Brent Smith - booking
- Snoop Dogg - arranger, executive producer, primary artist, producer
- Ethan Sugar - engineer
- Super Ced - drum programming, producer
- Brian "B-Luv" Thomas - engineer
- Pat Thrall - engineer
- Frank Vasquez - engineer
- Jordan "JMKM" Maldonado - assistant engineer
- Mark Vinten - engineer
- Andrew Wuepper - engineer

== Charts ==
=== Weekly charts ===
Chart (2009)	Peak position
French Albums (SNEP)	62
Swiss Albums (Schweizer Hitparade)	74
UK R&B Albums (OCC)	25
US Billboard 200	23
US Digital Albums (Billboard)	8
US Top R&B/Hip-Hop Albums (Billboard)	5

=== Year-end charts ===
Chart (2010)	Peak position
US Billboard 200	135
US Top R&B/Hip-Hop Albums (Billboard)	34
US Rap Albums (Billboard)	15

== Certifications and sales ==
Region	Certification	Certified units/sales
United States	—	400,000
