= Joy and Pain (Rob Base & DJ E-Z Rock song) =

Single by Rob Base & DJ E-Z Rock

from the album It Takes Two
- Released: 1989
- Songwriter: Robert Ginyard (Rob Base)

Rob Base & DJ E-Z Rock singles chronology
"Get on the Dance Floor" (1988)	"Joy and Pain" (1989)	"Break of Dawn" (1994)

"Joy and Pain" is a song by hip-hop duo Rob Base & DJ E-Z Rock.

== Charts ==
Chart (1989)	Peak position
US Billboard Hot 100	58
US Dance Club Songs (Billboard)	9
US Hot R&B/Hip-Hop Songs (Billboard)	11
