= Boom (Snoop Dogg song) =

Single by Snoop Dogg featuring T-Pain

from the album Doggumentary
- Released: March 8, 2011
- Recorded: 2010
- Genre: Hip hop
- Length: 3:51
- Label: Priority
- Songwriters: Calvin Broadus; Faheem Najm; Scott Storch; Vince Clarke
- Producer: Scott Storch

Snoop Dogg singles chronology
"Last Night" (2011)	"Boom" (2011)	"If I Was You (OMG)" (2011)

T-Pain singles chronology
"Welcome to My Hood" (2011)	"Boom" (2011)	"Best Love Song" (2011)

"Boom" is a song by American rapper Snoop Dogg featuring fellow American singer T-Pain. It serves as the second official single from the former's eleventh studio album Doggumentary. Produced by Scott Storch, it was leaked on March 4, 2011, and officially released on March 8, 2011, along with the video, which was produced by Dylan Brown.

This song with T-Pain is featured on the soundtrack for the video game Madden NFL 12.

== Background ==
Produced by Scott Storch, "Boom" contains an interpolation from the 1980s hit "Situation" by Yazoo.

== Chart performance ==
On March 19, 2011, "Boom" debuted on the Billboard Hot 100 at number 76 and on the Hot Digital Songs chart at number 53.

== Charts ==
Chart (2011)	Peak position
Australia (ARIA)	40
Belgium (Ultratip Bubbling Under Flanders)	15
Belgium (Ultratip Bubbling Under Wallonia)	28
Scotland Singles (OCC)	61
UK Hip Hop/R&B (OCC)	14
UK Singles (OCC)	56
US Billboard Hot 100	76
US Bubbling Under R&B/Hip-Hop Singles (Billboard)	4
