= It Takes Two (album) =

Studio album by Rob Base & DJ E-Z Rock
- Released: August 9, 1988
- Studios: Hillside, Englewood, NJ
- Genre: Hip-hop
- Length: 41:11
- Label: Profile
- Producers: Rob Base; William Hamilton; DJ E-Z Rock; Donald Dee Bowden; Thomas Dean

Rob Base & DJ E-Z Rock chronology
It Takes Two (1988)	Break of Dawn (1994)

Singles from It Takes Two
- 1. "It Takes Two" Released: August 2, 1988; 2. "Get on the Dance Floor" Released: 1988; 3. "Joy and Pain" Released: 1989

Professional ratings
Review scores
Source	Rating
AllMusic	4.5/5 stars
MusicHound R&B: The Essential Album Guide	3/5 stars

It Takes Two is the debut studio album by American hip-hop duo Rob Base & DJ E-Z Rock. It was released on August 9, 1988, through Profile Records. The recording sessions took place at Hillside Sound Studio in Englewood, New Jersey. The album was produced by William Hamilton, Donald Dee Bowden, Thomas Dean, Rob Base, and DJ E-Z Rock. Both the album and the title track/single were certified platinum by the Recording Industry Association of America on June 12, 1989, and December 28, 1989, respectively.

The album produced two minor hit singles, "It Takes Two" and "Joy and Pain", and the No. 1 Dance single produced by David "DJ" Wynn, "Get on the Dance Floor".

== Track listing ==
No.	Title	Length
1.	"It Takes Two"	5:00
2.	"Joy and Pain"	3:45
3.	"Don't Sleep on It"	4:00
4.	"Check This Out"	2:59
5.	"Crush"	5:29
6.	"Get on the Dance Floor"	4:23
7.	"Times Are Gettin' Ill"	3:38
8.	"Keep It Going Now"	3:50
9.	"Make It Hot"	4:19
10.	"Creativity"	3:48
Total length:		41:11

== Charts ==
=== Weekly charts ===
Chart (1988–89)	Peak position
Canada Top Albums/CDs (RPM)	12
US Billboard 200	31
US Top R&B/Hip-Hop Albums (Billboard)	4

=== Year-end charts ===
Chart (1989)	Position
Canada Top Albums/CDs (RPM)	46
US Billboard 200	36

== Certifications ==
Region	Certification	Certified units/sales
United States (RIAA)	Platinum	1,000,000^{^}
^{^} Shipments figures based on certification alone.
