= I Wanna Rock (Snoop Dogg song) =

Snoop Dogg single

Single by Snoop Dogg

from the album Malice n Wonderland
- Released: November 17, 2009
- Recorded: 2009
- Genre: West Coast hip-hop
- Length: 3:56
- Label: Priority; Doggystyle
- Songwriters: J. Brown; C. Broadus; R. Ginyard; E. Molina
- Producer: Scoop DeVille

Snoop Dogg singles chronology
"That's Tha Homie" (2009)	"I Wanna Rock" (2009)	"Pronto" (2009)

Music video
- "I Wanna Rock" on YouTube

"I Wanna Rock" is the third official single from American rapper, Snoop Dogg's tenth studio album, Malice n Wonderland. It was released digitally on iTunes on November 17, 2009, after the second single "That's Tha Homie". The song was produced by Scoop DeVille and mixed by Dr. Dre, and Snoop Dogg released it on a mixtape titled "I Wanna Rock" on November 23. The song was confirmed by BBC Radio 1 to be released in the UK on March 15, 2010 but is now listed as "Coming Soon".

The lines "Right about now" and "I wanna rock right now" as well as the beat are sampled from Rob Base and DJ E-Z Rock's 1988 song "It Takes Two." The main sample is from "Space Dust" by Galactic Force Band. The beat was produced by Scoop DeVille.

== Music video ==
The music video (directed by Erick Peyton) premiered on MTV Hits and MTV.com on November 26, 2009. It features Jamie Foxx, America's Best Dance Crew season 3 winners Quest Crew, Hip-Hop Group Far East Movement, professional skateboarder Terry Kennedy, Laurie Ann Gibson, and popular Jerkin' crew The Ranger$. The video takes place during an alley dance battle and Snoop rapping on top of a roof.

== Track listing ==
Digital single
No.	Title	Writer(s)	Producer(s)	Length
1.	"I Wanna Rock" (single edit)	J. Brown, C. Broadus, S. Carter, R. Ginyard, E. Molina	Scoop DeVille	3:56

CD single
No.	Title	Writer(s)	Producer(s)	Length
1.	"I Wanna Rock" (featuring Jay-Z; The Kings G-Mix)	J. Brown, A. Young, C. Broadus, R. Ginyard, E. Molina, S. Carter	Scoop DeVille	4:02
2.	"I Wanna Rock" (edited version) (featuring Jay-Z; The Kings G-Mix)	J. Brown, A. Young, C. Broadus, R. Ginyard, E. Molina, S. Carter	Scoop DeVille	4:00

== Charts ==
=== Weekly charts ===
Chart (2010)	Peak position
US Billboard Hot 100	41
US Hot R&B/Hip-Hop Songs (Billboard)	10
US Hot Rap Songs (Billboard)	3
US Rhythmic Airplay (Billboard)	12

=== Year-end charts ===
Chart (2010)	Position
US R&B/Hip-Hop Songs (Billboard)	57
US Rap Songs (Billboard)	22

== Remixes ==
"I Wanna Rock (The Kings' G-Mix)"

Single by Snoop Dogg featuring Jay-Z

from the album More Malice
- Released: January 26, 2010
- Recorded: 2009–2010
- Genre: Hip hop
- Length: 4:11
- Label: Priority/Doggystyle
- Songwriters: J. Brown; A. Young; C. Broadus; Shawn Carter; R. Ginyard; E. Molina
- Producer: Scoop DeVille

Snoop Dogg singles chronology
"Pronto" (2009)	"I Wanna Rock (The Kings' G-Mix)" (2010)	"That Tree" (2010)

Jay-Z singles chronology
"On to the Next One" (2009)	"I Wanna Rock (G-Mix)" (2010)	"Young Forever" (2010)

The official remix features Jay-Z and is referred to as "The Kings' G-Mix." The music video was released to YouTube through Snoop Dogg's official channel on March 25, 2010. The video has Jay-Z's vocals but he is not physically in the video Sometimes the Ludacris freestyle is added to the original or The Kings' G-Mix" on the radio as the remix. It features a vocal sample of "Microphone Fiend" by Eric B. & Rakim in Snoop Doggs new verse. It is the 1st track on the album's re-release, entitled More Malice.

The 2nd official remix has surfaced known as the "Interstate Trafficking Remix", and it features Roscoe Dash on the chorus, Rick Ross, Maino, OJ da Juiceman and Yo Gotti. It is produced by DJ Green Lantern with a whole different beat and a new verse by Snoop Dogg. It was leaked on February 15, 2010.

The 3rd official remix features Kardinal Offishall. It is known as the "TO Remix", and it has a new intro by Snoop Dogg.

The 4th official remix is the "Travis Barker Remix". It is the 2nd bonus track on the album's re-release, entitled More Malice.

Other remixes have been released, the "West Coast Remix", which features Tha Dogg Pound, Crooked I, Ras Kass and Nipsey Hussle., as well as the release of a "Queens Remix" featuring Lil' Kim and Lady of Rage. In addition, multiple rappers have freestyled over the beat, including:

- Yelawolf
- Ludacris
- Raekwon
- Kano
- Fat Joe
- Rock City
- Joell Ortiz
- Adil Omar
- Ras Kass
- Styles P
- Busta Rhymes
- Crooked I
- Cassidy
- Young Jeezy
- Tha Dogg Pound
- Bow Wow
- Nipsey Hussle
- Red Cafe
- Bun B
- Nu Jerzey Devil
- Juelz Santana
- Ace Hood
- Lil' Rob
- Trey Songz
- Tyga
- Sway
- Slick Rick
- Lil' Kim
- Jae Millz
- Lloyd Banks
- Chris Brown
- Jay-Z
