= Get on the Dance Floor =

Single by Rob Base and DJ E-Z Rock

from the album It Takes Two
- Released: 1988
- Length: 6:50 (The "Sky" King Remix); 4:24 (Album version)
- Songwriter(s): Robert Ginyard (Rob Base)

Rob Base and DJ E-Z Rock singles chronology
"It Takes Two" (1988)	"Get on the Dance Floor" (1988)	"Joy and Pain" (1988)

"Get on the Dance Floor" is a 1988 hip-hop single by Rob Base and DJ E-Z Rock. The single was their follow up to their highly successful recording, "It Takes Two". On the dance chart, "Get on the Dance Floor" was more successful than its predecessor, hitting number one for two weeks in January 1989. It also peaked at number eleven on the R&B singles chart.

"Get on the Dance Floor" samples The Jacksons 1979 song "Shake Your Body (Down to the Ground)" as well as the 1988 track "A Day in the Life" performed by Black Riot.

== Charts ==
Chart (1988)	Peak position
US Dance Club Songs (Billboard)	1
US Hot R&B/Hip-Hop Songs (Billboard)	11
