= The Incredible Base =

Studio album by Rob Base
- Released: November 21, 1989
- Recorded: 1989
- Studio: Hillside Sound Studio (Englewood, New Jersey)
- Genre: Hip-hop
- Length: 45:52
- Label: Profile
- Producer: William Hamilton (also exec.); Rob Base; David Wynn

Professional ratings
Review scores
Source	Rating
AllMusic	3/5 stars
The Village Voice	B+

The Incredible Base is the only solo studio album by American rapper Rob Base. It was released on November 21, 1989 through Profile Records. The recording sessions took place at Hillside Sound Studio in Englewood, New Jersey. It was produced by William Hamilton, Rob Base, and David Wynn. The album made it to No. 50 on the Billboard 200 and No. 20 on Billboard's Top R&B/Hip-Hop Albums chart, and was certified Gold by the Recording Industry Association of America.

== Track listing ==
All music is composed by Rob Base and William Hamilton, except tracks 3, 4, 5, 8, 9 co-produced with David Wynn.

No.	Title	Length
1.	"Turn It Out (Go Base)"	5:32
2.	"Get Up and Have a Good Time"	4:31
3.	"Rumors"	5:01
4.	"Hype It Up"	4:17
5.	"The Incredible Base"	3:50
6.	"War"	4:49
7.	"Outstanding"	4:47
8.	"If You Really Want to Party"	3:59
9.	"Dope Mix"	4:49
10.	"Ain't Nothing Like the Real Thing"	4:17
Total length:		45:52

== Charts ==
=== Weekly charts ===
Chart (1989–1990)	Peak position
Canada Top Albums/CDs (RPM)	44
US Billboard 200	50
US Top R&B/Hip-Hop Albums (Billboard)	20

=== Year-end charts ===
Chart (1990)	Position
US Top R&B/Hip-Hop Albums (Billboard)	69

== Certifications ==
Region	Certification	Certified units/sales
United States (RIAA)	Gold	500,000^{^}
^{^} Shipments figures based on certification alone.
