= Think (About It) (album) =

Studio album by Lyn Collins
- Released: September 27, 1972
- Recorded: April 29 – December 9, 1968 ("Just Won't Do Right", "Things Got to Get Better"); January 26, 1971 – April 24, 1972 (remainder of titles)
- Studio: King (Cincinnati, Ohio); Rodel (Washington, D.C.); Bobby Smith (Macon, Georgia); A & R (New York City); Cavern (Independence, Missouri)
- Genre: Funk; Soul
- Length: 30:35
- Label: People; 5602
- Producer: James Brown

Lyn Collins chronology
| Think (About It) (1972) | Check Me Out If You Don't Know Me by Now (1975) |

Singles from Think (About It)
- 1. "Wheels of Life / Just Won't Do Right" Released: December 1971; 2. "Think (About It) / Ain't No Sunshine" Released: May 5, 1972; 3. "Things Got To Get Better / Women's Lib" Released: 1972; 4. "Fly Me to the Moon" Released: 1973

Professional ratings
Review scores
| Source | Rating |
|---|---|
| AllMusic | 4/5 stars |

Think (About It) is the first studio album by Lyn Collins released on September 27, 1972, by People Records. The album includes two songs originally recorded in 1968 for Marva Whitney with Lyn Collins' voice overdubbed, "Just Won't Do Right" and "Things Got to Get Better".

== Track listing ==
Side one
| No. | Title | Writer(s) | Length |
|---|---|---|---|
| 1. | "Think (About It)" | James Brown | 3:21 |
| 2. | "Just Won't Do Right" | James Brown | 2:59 |
| 3. | "Wheels of Life" | Joe Valentine, Johnny Terry | 3:02 |
| 4. | "Ain't No Sunshine" | Bill Withers | 2:49 |
| 5. | "Things Got to Get Better" | James Brown, Alfred Ellis | 3:25 |

Side two
| No. | Title | Writer(s) | Length |
|---|---|---|---|
| 6. | "Never Gonna Give You Up" | Kenneth Gamble, Leon Huff, Jerry Butler | 3:02 |
| 7. | "Reach Out for Me" | Burt Bacharach, Hal David | 3:30 |
| 8. | "Women's Lib" | James Brown | 5:17 |
| 9. | "Fly Me to the Moon" | Bart Howard | 2:45 |

== Personnel ==
=== Musicians ===
- Lyn Collins – lead vocals

==== The James Brown Band (April 29, 1968) ====
"Things Got to Get Better"

- Waymon Reed – trumpet
- Fred Wesley – trombone
- Levi Rasbury – valve trombone
- Maceo Parker – tenor saxophone
- St. Clair Pinckney – baritone saxophone
- Alfred "Pee Wee" Ellis – electric organ
- Jimmy Nolen, Alfonzo Kellum – electric guitar
- Tim Drummond – bass guitar
- Clyde Stubblefield – drums

==== Studio band arranged by Pee Wee Ellis (December 9, 1968) ====
"Just Won't Do Right"

- Roberta DuBois, DeDe Kinard, Gigi Kinard – backing vocals
- Ken Tibbetts, probably Howard McGurty – trumpet
- Fred Wesley – trombone
- Alfred "Pee Wee" Ellis – alto saxophone, conducting
- Les Asch – tenor saxophone
- David Parkinson – baritone saxophone
- Tim Hedding – electric organ
- "Fat Eddie" Setser – electric guitar
- Dave Harrison – bass guitar
- probably Julius Reliford – congas
- William "Beau Dollar" Bowman – drums

==== The Original J.B.'s (January 26, 1971) ====
"Wheels of Life"

- Clayton "Chicken" Gunnels, Darryl "Hasaan" Jamison – trumpet
- Fred Wesley – trombone
- St. Clair Pinckney – tenor saxophone
- James Brown – piano
- Phelps "Catfish" Collins, Bobby Roach – electric guitar
- William "Bootsy" Collins – bass guitar
- Johnny Griggs – tambourine
- Don Juan "Tiger" Martin – drums

==== The J.B.'s (April 18, 1972) ====
"Think (About It)"

- James Brown, Hank Ballard, Vicki Anderson, various band members – backing vocals
- Russell Crimes, Isiah "Ike" Oakley – trumpet
- Fred Wesley – trombone
- Jimmy Parker – alto saxophone
- St. Clair Pinckney – tenor saxophone
- James Brown – electric organ
- Hearlon "Cheese" Martin or Bobby Roach – electric guitar
- Fred Thomas – bass guitar
- probably John "Jabo" Starks – tambourine
- John Morgan – drums

=== Production ===
- James Brown – arrangement ("Think (About It)", "Things Got to Get Better", "Women's Lib")
- Alfred "Pee Wee" Ellis – arrangement ("Just Won't Do Right")
- David Matthews – arrangement ("Wheels of Life", "Ain't No Sunshine", "Never Gonna Give You Up", "Reach Out for Me", "Fly Me to the Moon")
