= Break of Dawn (Rob Base & DJ E-Z Rock album) =

Studio album by Rob Base & DJ E-Z Rock
- Released: September 13, 1994
- Recorded: 1993–1994
- Genre: Hip-hop
- Length: 36:29
- Label: Funky Base
- Producer: DJ E-Z Rock, Rob Base, Al Dellentash, Dave Kowolski, Jeff Dovner, Kyle Robinson

Rob Base & DJ E-Z Rock chronology
It Takes Two (1988)	Break of Dawn (1994)

Professional ratings
Review scores
Source	Rating
AllMusic	2/5 stars
The Cincinnati Post	B+

Break of Dawn is the second and final studio album by Rob Base & DJ E-Z Rock. It was released in 1994 via Base's label, Funky Base Records. It was produced by DJ E-Z Rock, Rob Base, Al Dellentash, Dave Kowolski, Kyle Robinson and Jeff Dovner. Break of Dawn was met with lackluster sales; also, the album did not chart and its only single, "Break of Dawn", did chart at #18 on Hip-Hop billboard chart.

== Critical reception ==
The Cincinnati Post called the album "a pleasant surprise" and "slammin' big fun with stellar grooves."

== Track listing ==
1. "Interlude" - 0:26
2. "Break of Dawn" - 3:42
3. "Interlude" - 0:30
4. "Run Things" - 2:43
5. "Let the Funk Flow" - 3:17
6. "Symphony" - 3:20
7. "Interlude" - 1:50
8. "Are You With Me?" - 4:29
9. "Bike Tights" - 2:45
10. "Interlude" - 0:26
11. "Make It Hot" - 3:03
12. "Chillin'" - 3:50
13. "I'm Comin'... I'm Comin'... I Came" - 3:21
14. "Interlude" - 0:17
15. "Get Your Hands Up" - 3:20
