= Platinum (Snoop Dogg song) =

Promotional single by Snoop Dogg featuring R. Kelly

from the album Doggumentary
- Released: February 22, 2011
- Genre: Hip-hop
- Length: 4:29
- Label: Priority
- Songwriters: Calvin Broadus, Lexus Arnel Lewis and Robert Sylvester Kelly
- Producer: Lex Luger

"Platinum" is a song by American rapper Snoop Dogg, released as the third promotional single from his eleventh studio album Doggumentary. The song features guest vocals from R&B singer R. Kelly, and is produced by American producer Lex Luger.

== Release ==
The song was released on February 22, 2011 as a promotional single, although it reached Number 62 at Billboard Hot R&B/Hip-Hop Songs.

== Chart performance ==
Chart (2011)	Peak position
US Hot R&B/Hip-Hop Songs (Billboard)	60
