= Life of da Party =

Single by Snoop Dogg featuring Too Short & Mistah F.A.B.

from the album Ego Trippin'
- Released: March 11, 2008
- Recorded: 2007
- Genre: West Coast hip hop
- Length: 4:29
- Label: Doggystyle, Geffen
- Songwriter(s): Snoop Dogg, Stanley Peter Cox, Elijah Blue Molina, Todd Anthony Shaw
- Producer(s): Scoop DeVille

Snoop Dogg singles chronology
| "Neva Have 2 Worry" (2007) | "Life of da Party" (2008) | "My Medicine" (2008) |

Too Short singles chronology
| "Keep Bouncin'" (2006) | "Life of da Party" (2008) | "Something About This Girl" (2008) |

"Life of da Party" is the third single from Snoop Dogg's ninth solo album Ego Trippin'. It features Too Short and Mistah F.A.B. and was produced by Scoop DeVille. It peaked at #5 on the Bubbling Under Hot 100 Singles chart, making it Mistah F.A.B.'s most successful single to date.

== Track listing ==
Digital download

1. «Life of da Party» (feat. Too Short & Mistah F.A.B.) — 4:23

CD single

1. «Life Of Da Party (Radio Version With Snoop Intro Clean)» (feat. Too Short & Mistah F.A.B.) − 4:23
2. «Life Of Da Party (With Snoop Intro Dirty)» (feat. Too Short & Mistah F.A.B.) − 4:23
3. «Life Of Da Party (Instrumental)» (feat. Too Short & Mistah F.A.B.) − 4:23

== Music video ==
On a track the clip was shot from Too Short and Mistah F.A.B. The music video was featured on the BET show, 106 & Park, as a New Joint on March 11, 2008.

== Charts ==
| Chart (2008) | Peak position |
|---|---|
| US Bubbling Under Hot 100 Singles (Billboard) | 5 |
| US Hot R&B/Hip-Hop Songs (Billboard) | 48 |
| US R&B/Hip-Hop Airplay (Billboard) | 48 |
| US Hot Rap Songs (Billboard) | 14 |
| US Rhythmic (Billboard) | 31 |
