= Neva Have 2 Worry =

2008 single by Snoop Dogg

Single by Snoop Dogg featuring Uncle Chucc

from the album Ego Trippin'
- Released: February 19, 2008
- Recorded: 2007
- Genre: West Coast hip hop; R&B
- Length: 4:18
- Label: Doggystyle, Geffen
- Songwriters: C. Broadus, T. Riley, Charles "Uncle Chucc" Hamilton, Larrance Dopson, Russell Redeaux
- Producers: Snoop Dogg, Terrace Martin

Snoop Dogg singles chronology
"Sensual Seduction" (2007)	"Neva Have 2 Worry" (2008)	"Life of da Party" (2008)

Music video
- "Neva Have 2 Worry" on YouTube

"Neva Have 2 Worry" is a song by American rapper Snoop Dogg featuring Uncle Chucc, taken from Snoop Dogg's ninth studio album Ego Trippin'. It is produced by Snoop and Terrace Martin, was released on February 19, 2008, as the third single from the album.

== Track listing ==
- Download digital
1. Neva Have 2 Worry (com a participação de Uncle Chucc) — 4:18

== Music video ==
The official video was released on June 23, 2008, on iTunes.
