= Sensual Seduction =

2007 single by Snoop Dogg

Single by Snoop Dogg

from the album Ego Trippin'
- Released: November 20, 2007
- Recorded: 2007
- Genre: Disco; soul
- Length: 4:06
- Label: Doggy Style; Geffen
- Songwriters: Calvin Broadus; Demetrius Stewart; Seneca Lovejoy
- Producer: Shawty Redd

Snoop Dogg singles chronology
"Ghetto" (2007)	"Sensual Seduction" (2007)	"Neva Have 2 Worry" (2008)

Music video
- "Sensual Seduction" on YouTube

"Sensual Seduction", also known as "Sexual Eruption", is a song by American rapper Snoop Dogg. It was released on November 20, 2007 as the first single of his ninth studio album Ego Trippin', with the record label Geffen Records. The song was produced by Shawty Redd. Snoop Dogg sings the majority of the song using Auto-Tune. The video's style visually references the style of Roger Troutman, as part of its retro imagery.

== Writing and background ==
Snoop Dogg originally heard the single "Drifter", produced by Atlanta-based producer Fatboi, and was prepared to purchase the song. Snoop Dogg's cousin — So So Def affiliate rapper-producer Daz Dillinger — began to facilitate mediations between the two artists. Dillinger, in a good connection with Shawty Redd, organized an arrangement in which Shawty agreed to send Dillinger the rights, but also offered to make an exclusive track for Snoop with a similar sound to that of "Drifter". Daz also organized an audition meeting for the two while Snoop was touring Georgia. Shawty Redd was unable to attend the meeting, but later conversed about the beat with Snoop via telephone. He sent a demo instrumental to Los Angeles, and was ultimately surprised by the changes Snoop made to the track. Originally, Redd didn't intend to use the auto-tuned effect on the vocals. The tape was sent back, vocals included, and Shawty began to play it in his local club. The song was leaked in early October 2007. This song was released as downloadable content for the Rock Band series.

On the song Snoop Dogg notably used the Auto-Tune vocal effect for his singing. The rapper explained his Auto Tune usage in 2022, saying that he wanted to emulate the musical style of R&B singer T-Pain. T-Pain stated he appreciated Snoop's usage, although he told in a 2021 interview that "Sensual Seduction" made his feature appearances on hip hop artists' songs obsolete, because they realized they could've used the effect by themselves.

== Music video ==
The music video for "Sensual Seduction" was directed by Melina and produced by Steven Johnson, and premiered November 28, 2007 on MTV. The video features Snoop in retro eighties outfits holding a keytar while using a talkbox, and includes direct homages to Prince's "When Doves Cry" video. It also features him in a retro seventies outfit dancing in a colored background. It is the second time Snoop Dogg has made a retro style video. The first was in "Doggy Dogg World". MADtv parodied this video as "Sensible Deduction," featuring Keegan-Michael Key as Snoop Dogg. A remixed version of the video as Wideboys Club Mix also exists, and sees Snoop Dogg singing in the Wideboys club, while the club dancers are seeing dancing in background.

== Remixes ==
There are 2 official remixes of the song that add new featured artists, the first remix using the clean version, "Sensual Seduction", and featuring Lil' Kim. The second remix uses both versions of the song and is called "Sensual Seduction (Fyre Department Remix)" or "Sexual Eruption (Fyre Department Remix)", and features Swedish artist Robyn and Snoop's 1st and 3rd verses are switched; on the clean version of this remix, the word "bitch" was not censored. Other official remixes include those done by American DJs David Garcia & High Spies, German DJ Boys Noize, Australian DJ Dirty South, and British DJs the Wideboys. There is also an unofficial remix by Skrillex called "Sexual Seduction". A remix called "The Art of Sensual Seduction" has not been officially released, although it is available in online shops, and a merengue/hip hop remix produced by Guary & Cleyton has been released titled "Seduccion Sensual".

== Versions ==
- Album Version (as it appears on Ego Trippin' titled "Sexual Eruption")
- "Sensual Seduction" (Radio Edit)
- "Sensual Seduction" [Remix] featuring Lil' Kim (Official Remix #1)
- "Sensual Seduction" [Fyre Department Remix] featuring Robyn (Official Remix #2)
- "Sensual Seduction" (Wideboys Club Mix)
- "Sensual Eruption" DPG Mix featuring Kurupt & Daz
- "Sensual Eruption" (David Garcia & High Spies Remix)
- "Sensual Eruption" (Boys Noize Remix)
- "Sensual Eruption" (Dirty South Remix)
- "Sensual Seduction" [Solly Bmore Remix]
- "Sexual Eruption" [Simon Sez Remix] featuring Snoop Dogg & Busta Rhymes
- "Sexual Eruption" [Instrumental]
- "Sexual Seduction" (Skrillex Remix)

== Commercial performance ==
In the United States, the single debuted at number 76 on the Billboard Hot 100 chart, dated on December 15, 2007. The song peaked at number seven on the Billboard Hot 100, making it Snoop Dogg's fifth top-ten single as a lead artist and eleventh overall. As of February 2009, "Sexual Eruption" sold 869,000 digital downloads in the United States. The song saw renewed popularity in early 2023 after its use in many videos on TikTok.

== Charts ==
=== Weekly charts ===
Chart (2007–2008)	Peak position
Australia (ARIA)	61
Australia (ARIA) Fyre Dept. Remix featuring Robyn	63
Australian Urban (ARIA)	17
Austria (Ö3 Austria Top 40)	40
Belgium (Ultratop 50 Flanders)	30
Belgium (Ultratip Bubbling Under Wallonia)	2
Canada Hot 100 (Billboard)	52
Czech Republic Airplay (ČNS IFPI)	14
Denmark (Tracklisten)	11
Finland (Suomen virallinen lista)	12
Germany (GfK)	15
Hungary (Rádiós Top 40)	34
Japan (Japan Hot 100)	38
Netherlands (Dutch Top 40)	21
Netherlands (Single Top 100)	36
New Zealand (Recorded Music NZ)	10
Slovakia Airplay (ČNS IFPI)	75
Sweden (Sverigetopplistan)	55
Sweden (Sverigetopplistan) Fyre Dept. Remix featuring Robyn	4
Switzerland (Schweizer Hitparade)	22
Turkey (Billboard)	1
Scottish Singles Sales (Official Charts)	24
UK Singles (Official Charts)	24
UK Hip Hop/R&B (Official Charts)	4
US Billboard Hot 100	7
US Adult R&B Songs (Billboard)	40
US Dance Club Songs (Billboard)	1
US Dance Airplay (Billboard)	17
US Hot R&B/Hip-Hop Songs (Billboard)	5
US Pop Airplay (Billboard)	19
US Rhythmic Airplay (Billboard)	3

=== Year-end charts ===
Chart (2008)	Position
Brazil (Crowley)	89
Sweden (Sverigetopplistan) featuring Robyn	49
UK Urban (Music Week)	10
US Billboard Hot 100	50
US Dance Club Songs (Billboard)	31
US Radio Songs (Billboard)	25
US Hot Ringtones (Billboard)	34
US Hot R&B/Hip-Hop Songs (Billboard)	25
US Rhythmic (Billboard)	21

== Certifications ==
Certifications for "Sensual Seduction"
Region	Certification	Certified units/sales
Brazil (Pro-Música Brasil)	Gold	30,000^{‡}
^{‡} Sales+streaming figures based on certification alone.

== Video credits ==
- Melina, director for Black Dog Films
- Steven Johnson, producer
- Factory Features, production co
- Omer Ganai, DP |
- Jarrett Fijal, editor
- Baked FX, vfx

== See also ==
- List of Billboard Hot 100 top 10 singles in 2008
