= Those Gurlz =

2008 single by Snoop Dogg

Single by Snoop Dogg

from the album Ego Trippin'
- Released: July 22, 2008
- Genre: Hip hop, g-funk
- Length: 4:00
- Label: Doggystyle, Geffen
- Songwriter(s): Calvin Broadus
- Producer(s): Teddy Riley, DJ Quik

Snoop Dogg singles chronology
"My Medicine" (2008)	"Those Gurlz" (2008)	"Gangsta Luv" (2009)

Music video
- "Those Gurlz" on YouTube

"Those Gurlz" is a song by American rapper Snoop Dogg, taken from Snoop Dogg's ninth studio album Ego Trippin'. It is produced by Teddy Riley and DJ Quik, was released on July 22, 2008, as the fourth single from the album.

== Track listing ==
- CD Single
1. Those Gurlz (Clean) — 4:00
2. Those Gurlz (Dirty) — 4:00
3. Those Gurlz (Instrumental) — 4:00

== Awards and nominations ==
Year	Ceremony	Award	Result
2008	BET's 106 & Park	Best video	Won

== Charts ==
Chart (2008)	Peark position
US Hot R&B/Hip-Hop Songs (Billboard)	91
