= New Year's Eve (song) =

Promotional single by Snoop Dogg featuring Marty James
- Released: November 5, 2010
- Recorded: 2010
- Genre: Hip hop
- Length: 3:26
- Label: EMI; Capitol; Priority
- Songwriter: C. Broadus
- Producer: Scoop DeVille

"New Year's Eve" is a song by American hip hop recording artist Snoop Dogg, released November 5, 2010, as a promotional single, which was originally from his eleventh studio album Doggumentary recordings but did not make the final track list. The song features American singer-songwriter Marty James.

== Music video ==
The video was filmed on November 8, 2010 during his wife's birthday party. The video was released on November 12, 2010 and is directed by Pook Brown. It features appearances from DJ Quik, Mike Epps and Kokane.

== Track listing ==
Digital single

No.	Title	Writer(s)	Producer(s)	Length
1.	"New Year's Eve" (featuring Marty James)	C. Broadus	Scoop DeVille	3:26

== Charts ==
Chart (2010)	Peak position
US Hot R&B/Hip-Hop Songs (Billboard)	66
