= My Medicine (song) =

Single by Snoop Dogg featuring Willie Nelson and Everlast

from the album Ego Trippin'
- Released: June 14, 2008
- Recorded: 2008
- Genre: Country rap
- Length: 2:40
- Label: Doggystyle, Geffen
- Songwriters: Calvin Broadus, Erik Schrody
- Producer: Everlast

Snoop Dogg singles chronology
"Life of da Party" (2008)	"My Medicine" (2008)	"Those Gurlz" (2008)

Music video
- "My Medicine" on YouTube

"My Medicine" is a song by American rapper Snoop Dogg, released on June 14, 2008, as the fourth single from his ninth studio album Ego Trippin'. The song features American country musicians Willie Nelson and Everlast, the latter of whom produced the song.

== Music video ==
The music video was directed by Pook Brown.

== Track listing ==
- CD Single
1. My Medicine (featuring Willie Nelson and Everlast) — 2:40

== Chart performance ==
=== Weekly charts ===
Chart (2008)	Peak position
Netherlands (Single Top 100)	39
