= Lyn Collins =

American singer (1948-2005)

Background information
- Also known as: Female Preacher
- Born: Gloria Lavern Collins; June 12, 1948; Dime Box, Texas, U.S.
- Died: March 13, 2005 (aged 56) Pasadena, California, U.S.
- Genres: Funk; soul; R&B
- Occupation: Singer
- Years active: 1962–2005
- Labels: Polydor; People

Gloria Lavern Collins (June 12, 1948 – March 13, 2005), better known as Lyn Collins, was an American soul singer best known for working with James Brown in the 1970s and for the influential 1972 funk single, "Think (About It)".

A favorite among hip-hop, R&B, and dance music producers for decades, Collins is one of the most sampled female artists of all time, with portions of her recordings used in over 3,500 songs.

== Early life and career ==
Collins began her recording career at age 14, singing lead vocals with a girl group called Charles Pikes & The Scholars. She sent her demo tape to James Brown, who initially prioritized her after Marva Whitney and Vicki Anderson. After Anderson left Brown for the second time, Collins received the opportunity to be the lead female in Brown's touring lineup. Her first single released was "Wheel of Life" in 1971 on King Records. When Brown left the label, Collins went to Polydor and People which left the record neglected. Collins recorded "What My Baby Needs Now Is a Little More Lovin'" with James Brown in 1972.

Her biggest solo hit was the James Brown-produced gospel-style song "Think (About It)", from her 1972 album of the same name on People Records. The song contains five breaks which have been sampled widely in hip-hop and drum and bass, most famously, the "Yeah! Woo!" and "It takes two to make a thing go right" loops in Rob Base and DJ E-Z Rock's "It Takes Two" which is composed almost completely from samples of Think, including a few lines of Collins' vocals. She also recorded the 1974 funk song "Rock Me Again and Again and Again and Again and Again and Again".

In 1975, she released album Check Me Out If You Don't Know Me by Now. She would go on to sing backup for Dionne Warwick and Rod Stewart. In the late 1980s and early 1990s, Collins attempted a comeback as a dance/club diva, recording the house single "Shout" for Belgium's ARS label. During this period a European tour was completed and a 1987 show alongside James Brown's Funky People which did not feature James Brown performing. In 1993, Collins' profile was given a boost by female dancehall singer Patra, who invited Collins to perform on her hit remake of "Think (About It)"; partly due to the resulting interest, her two official albums were reissued in England and the Netherlands.

In February 2005, Collins embarked on her first solo tour. For three weeks, she performed in the United Kingdom, France, Germany, Austria and Switzerland.

== Death ==
Shortly after returning from her 2005 European tour, Collins died from a seizure related to cardiac arrhythmia in Pasadena, California, at the age of 56. Fellow James Brown backup singer Martha High was alongside Collins during her final days alive.

== Legacy ==
In 2006, Paris-based Hi&Fly Records released a live album titled Mama Feelgood, which included recordings from her European tour and some interview clips. This release was produced by German-born DJ Pari, who produced for Marva Whitney and managed Collins' last tour.

Reflecting on her time working with James Brown, she reportedly said "I would have preferred to sing more and scream less."

== Cultural references ==
In October 2004, "Rock Me Again and Again" and "Think (About It)" featured on the Grand Theft Auto: San Andreas soundtrack, playing on fictional radio station Master Sounds 98.3. "Rock Me Again and Again" was covered by synth band The Human League on their 1984 album Hysteria. Bruce Springsteen's song "Shackled and Drawn" from his 2012 album Wrecking Ball and Ludacris' song "Southern Fried Intro" from his 2003 album Chicken-n-Beer both feature an excerpt from Collins' song "Me and My Baby Got Our Own Thing Going".

== Discography ==
=== Albums ===
Year	Album	US R&B
1972	Think (About It)	34
1975	Check Me Out If You Don't Know Me by Now	—
2005	Mama Feelgood: The Best of Lyn Collins	—
"—" denotes releases that did not chart.

=== Singles ===
Year	Single	Peak chart positions		Album
Year	Single	US	US R&B	Album
1971	"Wheels of Life"	—	—	Think (About It)
1972	"Oh Uncle Sammy"	—	—	Non-album single
1972	"Think (About It)"	66	9	Think (About It)
1972	"Things Got to Get Better"	—	—	Think (About It)
1972	"Me and My Baby Got a Good Thing Going"	86	—	Non-album single
1972	"What My Baby Needs Now Is a Little More Lovin'" (with James Brown)	56	17	Non-album single
1973	"Mama Feelgood"	—	37	Black Caesar
1973	"How Long Can I Keep It Up"	—	45	Slaughter's Big Rip-Off
1973	"Take Me Just as I Am"	—	35	Non-album single
1973	"We Want to Parrty, Parrty, Parrty"	—	64	Non-album single
1974	"Don't Make Me Over"	—	—	Non-album single
1974	"Give It Up or Turnit a Loose"	—	77	Non-album single
1974	"Rock Me Again & Again & Again & Again & Again & Again (6 Times)"	—	53	Check Me Out If You Don't Know Me by Now
1975	"You Can't Love Me, If You Don't Respect Me"	—	—	Non-album single
1975	"Baby Don't Do It"	—	—	Check Me Out If You Don't Know Me by Now
1975	"If You Don't Know Me by Now"	—	82	Check Me Out If You Don't Know Me by Now
1975	"Mr. Big Stuff"	—	—	Check Me Out If You Don't Know Me by Now
"—" denotes releases that did not chart.

== See also ==
- Marva Whitney
- Vicki Anderson
- Yvonne Fair
