= Gangsta Luv =

Single by Snoop Dogg featuring The-Dream

from the album Malice n Wonderland
- Released: October 6, 2009
- Recorded: 2009
- Genre: Hip hop
- Length: 4:17
- Label: Priority; Doggystyle
- Songwriter(s): Calvin Broadus; Terius Nash; C. Stewart
- Producer(s): Tricky Stewart; The-Dream

Snoop Dogg singles chronology
"Dime Piece" (2009)	"Gangsta Luv" (2009)	"That's Tha Homie" (2009)

The-Dream singles chronology
"Sweat It Out" (2009)	"Gangsta Luv" (2009)	"Love King" (2010)

"Gangsta Luv" is the lead single from Snoop Dogg's tenth studio album, Malice n Wonderland. It was produced by Tricky Stewart and co-produced by The-Dream, who is also featured in the song. It was released digitally on October 6, 2009, as the first official single of Malice n Wonderland after the promo single "Snoop Dogg Millionaire".

== Music video ==
The music video (directed by Paul Hunter) premiered on October 21, 2009. DJ Felli Fel makes a cameo appearance in the video. The video was introduced on 106 & Park on October 30, 2009, during a special Halloween episode. The music video shows The-Dream driving a blue Cadillac Low-Rider, and Snoop Dogg sitting in the back. Throughout the video, the appearance of Snoop Dogg, The-Dream and the girls around them change as the car travels through different places. The way the car appears to drive through various locations (including impossible indoor locations such as a women's locker room) is very similar to the opening-credits sequences of The Naked Gun films.

The video ranked at #66 on BET's Notarized: Top 100 Videos of 2009 countdown.

== Track listing ==
Digital single

No.	Title	Writer(s)	Producer(s)	Length
1.	"Gangsta Luv" (feat. The-Dream)	C. Broadus, T. Nash, C. Stewart	Tricky Stewart, The-Dream	4:17
2.	"Gangsta Luv" (Mayer Hawthorne G-Mix)		Mayer Hawthorne	3:50

== Commercial performance ==
On the week ending November 7, 2009, "Gangsta Luv" debuted on the Billboard Hot 100 at #57. The following week, it fell to #60, but it came back up to #55 in its third week. On the week ending December 17, 2009, it broke into the Top 40 at #35.

== Charts ==
=== Weekly charts ===
Chart (2009–2010)	Peak position
Belgium (Ultratop 50 Wallonia)	18
New Zealand (Recorded Music NZ)	13
US Billboard Hot 100	35
US Hot R&B/Hip-Hop Songs (Billboard)	24
US Pop Airplay (Billboard)	39
US Hot Rap Songs (Billboard)	5
US Rhythmic (Billboard)	8

=== Year-end charts ===
Chart (2010)	Peak position
US Rap Songs (Billboard)	23
