= Ego Trippin' =

Studio album by Snoop Dogg
- Released: March 11, 2008
- Recorded: 2007
- Genre: Hip-hop
- Length: 77:43
- Labels: Doggy Style; Geffen
- Producers: Scoop DeVille; Snoop Dogg; Polow da Don; Everlast; Scott Storch; Ron Fair; Frequency; Hit-Boy; J. R. Rotem; Khao; Tha Bizness; Terrace Martin; The Neptunes; Nottz; Bobby Ozuna; DJ Quik; Rick Rock; Raphael Saadiq; Teddy Riley

Snoop Dogg chronology
Tha Blue Carpet Treatment (2006)	Ego Trippin' (2008)	Malice n Wonderland (2009)

Singles from Ego Trippin'
- 1. "Sensual Seduction" Released: November 20, 2007; 2. "Neva Have 2 Worry" Released: February 19, 2008; 3. "Life of da Party" Released: March 11, 2008; 4. "My Medicine" Released: June 14, 2008; 5. "Those Gurlz" Released: July 22, 2008

Ego Trippin' is the ninth studio album by American rapper Snoop Dogg. It was released on March 11, 2008, by Doggystyle Records and Geffen Records. The album debuted at number 3 on the US Billboard 200, selling 137,000 copies in its first week. Upon its release, the album received generally positive reviews from music critics.

== Background ==
The album was originally set to feature no guests and showcase Snoop Dogg only, hence the title "Ego Trippin'". However, Snoop Dogg proved this concept untrue as he scheduled tracks with the likes of Charlie Wilson, among others. All of the photography was taken at Long Beach Polytechnic High School, Snoop's high school. Snoop Dogg also went on to admit he used ghostwriters for this album, such as American rapper Problem, among others:

I was watching Diana Ross get inducted into a Hall of Fame, and she got up there and named all of these great songwriters. Her biggest songs were written by somebody else. So I’m thinking, Wow, there’s nothing wrong with my pen, but I’m going to let other people write for me

Snoop Dogg originally confirmed that Pharrell, Nelly and Charlie Wilson would appear on a track entitled "Feet Don't Fail Me Now", and that he also would like to work with Bono, Madonna and Mick Jagger as well. However, "Feet Don't Fail Me Now" and none of the collaborations would make the final album cut except for Charlie Wilson's features. Collaborations with DJ Quik, Raphael Saadiq, Teddy Riley and Too Short were also scheduled for the album. Snoop Dogg formed a production supergroup for the album called "QDT" (Quik-Dogg-Teddy).

Snoop Dogg spoke on working with Everlast for a country song called "Johnny Cash". However, the track's title was changed to "My Medicine" with Everlast playing the guitar. Another track with Charlie Wilson and The Gap Band called "Can't Say Goodbye" was also confirmed for the album. Snoop Dogg reminisced on the track stating, "This song makes me want to cry every time I hear it. It is a reflection of my life and how I have grown as not only an artist but also a man - it is about me staying true to where I came from while having to accept where I am in my life today, it's deep".

Snoop Dogg and Charlie Wilson both performed 'Can't Say Goodbye' on American Idol's 'Idol Gives Back' Charity Performance. On July 29, 2008 BET's 106 & Park premiered Snoop Dogg's video for "Those Gurlz".

Track 2, "Press Play" was featured in the video game Midnight Club: Los Angeles.

== Critical reception ==
Professional ratings
Aggregate scores
Source	Rating
Metacritic	71/100
Review scores
Source	Rating
AllMusic	3.5/5 stars
The A.V. Club	B+
Entertainment Weekly	B
Los Angeles Times	2.5/4 stars
MSN Music (Consumer Guide)	B−
Pitchfork	6.6/10
PopMatters	7/10
RapReviews	9/10
Rolling Stone	3.5/5 stars
USA Today	2.5/4 stars

Rolling Stone said, "[H]is languorous rapping has a way of inspiring inventively freaky sounds from producers... Result: the best Snoop disc in years."

Entertainment Weekly said, "All of Snoop's personalities make appearances on his ninth CD, Ego Trippin'....It's sentimental, it's fun... Maybe this old Dogg doesn't need any new tricks." Vibe said, "Lead single 'Sensual Seduction' is an undeniable masterpiece of throwback funk."

== Commercial performance ==
The album debuted at number three on the US Billboard 200 chart, selling 137,000 copies in its first week. In its second week the album fell to number seven on the Billboard 200 chart, selling 57,000 copies, for a two-week total of 194,000 copies. Ego Trippin' was the tenth best selling hip-hop album of the year. As of 2011, the album has sold 401,000 copies in the United States.

== Track listing ==
Ego Trippin' track listing
No.	Title	Writer(s)	Producer(s)	Length
1.	"A Word Witchya! (Intro)"	Calvin Broadus; Elijah Molina; Marvin Gaye; Gwen Gordy Fuqua; Sandra Greene	Scoop DeVille	1:20
2.	"Press Play" (featuring Kurupt)	C. Broadus; Ricardo Brown; David Blake; Terrace Martin; Ronald Isley; Rudolph Isley; O'Kelly Isley Jr.; Ernie Isley; Marvin Isley; Chris Jasper	DJ Quik	3:48
3.	"SD Is Out" (featuring Charlie Wilson)	C. Broadus; Dejanee Riley; Teddy Riley; Priest Brooks	Teddy Riley	3:49
4.	"Gangsta Like Me" (featuring Jamie Foxx)	C. Broadus; C. Broadus; D. Riley; T. Riley; Jamie Foxx; Glenda Proby	Riley	4:26
5.	"Neva Have 2 Worry" (featuring Uncle Chucc)	C. Broadus; C. Broadus; T. Riley; Charles "Uncle Chucc" Hamilton; Larrance Dopson; Russell Redeaux	Snoop Dogg; Terrace Martin	4:18
6.	"Sexual Eruption (Sensual Seduction)"	C. Broadus; Seneca Lovejoy; Demetrius Stewart	Shawty Redd	4:00
7.	"Life of da Party" (featuring Too Short and Mistah F.A.B.)	C. Broadus; E. Molina; Todd Shaw; Stanley P. Cox	DeVille	4:23
8.	"Waste of Time" (featuring Raphael Saadiq)	C. Broadus; Dave Young; Bobby Ozuna; Raphael Saadiq	Saadiq; Ozuna	3:33
9.	"Cool"	Prince Rogers Nelson; Dez Dickerson	T. Riley	4:02
10.	"Sets Up" (featuring Pharrell Williams)	C. Broadus; Williams	The Neptunes	3:44
11.	"Deez Hollywood Nights"	C. Broadus; Dominick Lamb; Bruce Sudano; Joe Esposito; Eddie Hokenson	Nottz	4:39
12.	"Whateva U Do"	C. Broadus; Kevin "Khao" Cates; Marc Coleman	Khao; Coleman	3:46
13.	"Staxxx in My Jeans"	C. Broadus; Thomas Jackson; Ricardo Thomas	Rick Rock	3:49
14.	"Been Around tha World"	C. Broadus; Terrace Martinn; R. Redeaux; Latonya "Tone Treasure" Givens	Snoop Dogg; Martin	3:36
15.	"Let It Out"	C. Broadus; T. Riley; D. Riley; T. Martin	Teddy Riley	2:38
16.	"My Medicine" (featuring Willie Nelson and Whitey Ford)	C. Broadus; C. Broadus; Erik Schrody	Whitey Ford	2:40
17.	"Ridin' in My Chevy"	C. Broadus; E. Molina	DeVille	3:15
18.	"Those Gurlz" (featuring Brandon Winbush)	C. Broadus; T. Riley; D. Blake; E. Molina	C. Broadus; Riley; DJ Quik	4:00
19.	"One Chance (Make It Good)"	C. Broadus; Bryan Fryzel; Prince Phillip Mitchell	Frequency	3:33
20.	"Why Did You Leave Me" (featuring Chilly Chil)	C. Broadus; C. Broadus; Devon Reed; Jamal Jones; Chauncey Hollis	C. Broadus; Polow da Don; Hit-Boy	4:07
21.	"Can't Say Goodbye" (featuring Charlie Wilson)	C. Broadus; T. Riley; D. Riley; G. Proby; Joseph Bereal; Bruce Hornsby	Teddy Riley	4:07
22.	"Nobody Better" (removed from edited version)	C. Broadus; David James Wolinsky; S. Thornton	Swiff D	3:24
23.	"Shootem Up" (removed from edited version)			3:40
24.	"Walk Away" (removed from edited version)	C. Broadus; K. Cates	Cates	4:07
Total length:				77:43

Notes

- "A Word Witchya!" samples "Distant Lover" performed by Marvin Gaye
- "Press Play" samples "Voyage to Atlantis" performed by The Isley Brothers
- "Cool" is a cover of The Time's song "Cool"
- "Sets Up" samples "Hola' Hovito" performed by Jay-Z
- "Deez Hollywood Nights" samples "Hollywood Knights" performed by Brooklyn Dreams
- "My Medicine" samples the traditional nursery rhyme "Jack Be Nimble"
- "Those Girls" samples "Too Much Heaven" performed by The Bee Gees
- "One Chance (Make it Good)" samples "Make It Good" performed by Prince Philip Mitchell
- "Why Did You Leave Me" samples "Celtic Rain" performed by Mike Oldfield
- "Can't Say Goodbye" samples "The Way It Is" performed by Bruce Hornsby & The Range
- "Walk Away" samples "Down Rodeo" performed by Rage Against the Machine

== Personnel ==
Credits adapted from the album's liner notes and AllMusic.

- Snoop Dogg – vocals (5–7, 10, 13, 16–17, 20, lead on (1–4, 8–9, 11–12, 14–15, 18–19, 21), background vocals (15)
- J. Black – background vocals (14)
- Mike Bozzi – mastering assistant
- Chuck Brungardt – engineer
- Chilly Chil – vocals (20)
- Ted Chung – A&R
- Marcus Coleman – producer
- Erick "Baby Jesus" Coomes – bass guitar (18)
- Aaron Dahl – assistant engineer
- Larrance Dopson – keyboards (5)
- Scott Elgin – engineer
- Ron Fair – arranger (6)
- Whitey Ford – producer
- Jamie Foxx – additional lead vocals (4)
- Latonya "Tone Treasure" Givens – background vocals (2, 12, 14)
- Andrew Gouche – bass guitar (1)
- Daniel Groover – guitar (20)
- Tescia Harris – background vocals (4)
- John Hart – upright bass (16)
- Tasha Hayward – hair stylist
- Mike Hogue – assistant engineer
- Erika Jerry – background vocals (9)
- Brian Kennedy – keyboards (20)
- Justin Kirk – trombone (2)
- Kurupt – additional lead vocals (2)
- Lady G – background vocals (3)
- Trevor Lawrence Jr. – drums (16)
- Terrace Martin – vocals (5, background on 15), additional music arranger (1–2, 7, 11–12, 17, 19), grand piano (19), keyboards (1, 8, 11–12, 14, 17), synthesizer (5), alto sax (2, 5), percussion (1, 12)
- Andrew Mezzi – mixing assistant
- Mistah F.A.B. – vocals (7)
- Peter Mokran – mixing
- Richard Niles – engineer
- Bobby Ozuna – drums, percussion (8)
- Neil Pogue – mixing
- Omar Reyna – engineer
- Teddy Riley – background vocals (3–4, 15)
- April Roomet – stylist
- Raphael Saadiq – guitar, bass guitar, Hammond organ, vocals (8)
- Fareed Salamah – assistant
- Alexis Seton – mixing assistant
- Corey Stocker – engineer
- James Tanksley – assistant engineer, engineer
- Too Short – vocals (7)
- Uncle Chucc – vocals (5, background on 9), bass guitar (5, 17)
- Javier Valverde – assistant
- Franklin Rivers Vasquez – engineer
- Liam Ward – layout design
- Kamasi Washington – tenor sax (2)
- Calthomeesh West – background vocals (2, 15)
- Whitey Ford – guitar (16)
- Marlon Williams – guitar (1, 5, 11, 19)
- Meelah Williams – background vocals (9)
- Pharrell Williams – additional vocals (10)
- Charlie Wilson – additional lead vocals (3, 21)
- Brandon Winbush – additional vocals (18)
- Dante Winslow – trumpet (2)
- Dave Young – background vocals (8)

== Charts ==
=== Weekly charts ===
Weekly chart performance for Ego Trippin'
Chart (2008)	Peak position
Australian Albums (ARIA)	29
Australian Urban Albums (ARIA)	7
Austrian Albums (Ö3 Austria)	42
Belgian Albums (Ultratop Flanders)	27
Belgian Albums (Ultratop Wallonia)	70
Canadian Albums (Billboard)	3
Croatia (TOTS)	34
Danish Albums (Hitlisten)	40
Dutch Albums (Album Top 100)	34
French Albums (SNEP)	19
German Albums (Offizielle Top 100)	29
Irish Albums (IRMA)	62
Italian Albums (FIMI)	37
New Zealand Albums (RMNZ)	24
Norwegian Albums (VG-lista)	26
Scottish Albums (Official Charts)	43
Swiss Albums (Schweizer Hitparade)	9
UK Albums (Official Charts)	23
UK R&B Albums (Official Charts)	4
US Billboard 200	3
US Top R&B/Hip-Hop Albums (Billboard)	2
US Indie Store Album Sales (Billboard)	2

=== Year-end charts ===
Year-end chart performance for Ego Trippin'
Chart (2008)	Position
US Billboard 200	115
US Top R&B/Hip-Hop Albums (Billboard)	33
US Top Rap Albums (Billboard)	11

== Certifications ==
Certifications for Ego Trippin'
Region	Certification	Certified units/sales
Russia (NFPF)	Gold	10,000^{*}
United States (Nielsen SoundScan)	—	400,000
^{*} Sales figures based on certification alone.

== Release history ==
Release dates and formats for Ego Trippin'
Region	Date	Ref.
Germany	March 7, 2008	
United States	March 11, 2008	
United Kingdom	March 31, 2008	
