= It Takes Two (Rob Base & DJ E-Z Rock song) =

1988 single by Rob Base and DJ E-Z Rock

Single by Rob Base & DJ E-Z Rock

from the album It Takes Two
- Released: June 1, 1988
- Genre: Hip-hop
- Length: 5:00 (album version); 4:32 (radio edit); 3:31 (short edit)
- Label: Profile
- Songwriters: James Brown; Robert Ginyard
- Producers: Rob Base and DJ E-Z Rock; William Hamilton

Rob Base & DJ E-Z Rock singles chronology
"It Takes Two" (1988)	"Get on the Dance Floor" (1988)

Music video
- "It Takes Two" on YouTube

"It Takes Two" is a song by New York City hip-hop duo Rob Base & DJ E-Z Rock that became a top-40 single and was later certified platinum by the Recording Industry Association of America (RIAA). Since its release in 1988 by Profile Records, the song has been covered and sampled by several recording artists.

"There are many critics and listeners who claim that Rob Base & DJ EZ Rock's 'It Takes Two' is the greatest hip-hop single ever cut," noted music critic Stephen Thomas Erlewine of AllMusic. "It's hard to disagree with them." Spin magazine published a list titled "100 Greatest Singles of All Time" in 1989 and ranked "It Takes Two" at number one. In 2021, it was listed at number 116 on Rolling Stone's "Top 500 Best Songs of All Time".

== Composition and background ==
The song was produced by Rob Base, DJ E-Z Rock, and William Hamilton and built around the Think break sample and other elements from Lyn Collins' 1972 song "Think (About It)." Rhonda Parris was brought in by Profile Records to sing the hook. The song was sampled in November 1989 by the female dance-pop trio Seduction in their hit song "Two to Make It Right" (lyrics only); it was also sampled by the Black Eyed Peas in their 2010 hit "Rock That Body."

== Critical reception ==
Simon Reynolds from Melody Maker wrote, "The Rob Base/E.Z. Rock track is another exercise in attrition through overbearing sensual soul power. They take a shriek of JB at his most histrionic, and turn what is on the original record a singular peak of ecstasy into a jackknifing rhythmic copula that just goes on and on and on, like a locked groove. Climax after climax after climax. The effect is akin to hyperventilation."

== Charts ==
Chart (1988)	Peak position
UK Singles (OCC)	24
US Billboard Hot 100	36
US Dance Club Songs (Billboard)	3
US Hot R&B/Hip-Hop Songs (Billboard)	17

== Certifications ==
Region	Certification	Certified units/sales
United States (RIAA)	Platinum	1,000,000^{^}
^{^} Shipments figures based on certification alone.

== "It Takes Scoop" ==
"It Takes Scoop"

Single by Fatman Scoop featuring the Crooklyn Clan
- Released: February 9, 2004
- Length: 4:19 (album version); 2:50 (radio edit)
- Label: Def Jam; AV8
- Songwriters: Fatman Scoop; Giotto Bini; Andrea Rizzo
- Producer: The Crooklyn Clan

Fatman Scoop singles chronology
"Be Faithful" (2003)	"It Takes Scoop" (2004)	"In the Club" (2004)

The Crooklyn Clan singles chronology
"Be Faithful" (2003)	"It Takes Scoop" (2004)

Audio
- "It Takes Scoop" on YouTube

In 2000, DJ Kool used "It Takes Two" as a basis for his song of the same name, featuring Fatman Scoop. His version charted at number 12 on the US Billboard Hot Rap Singles chart that July. Fatman Scoop later recorded his own version of DJ Kool's take, retitling it "It Takes Scoop", which features the Crooklyn Clan. It was released as the follow-up to "Be Faithful", which topped the UK singles chart in October 2003 and charted worldwide. Fatman Scoop wrote the track with Giotto Bini and Andrea Rizzo, and it was produced by the Crooklyn Clan.

Along with the original "Think (About It)" sample, "It Takes Scoop" contains elements from "Treat 'Em Right" and "Caught Up" by Chubb Rock and "White Lines (Don't Don't Do It)" by Melle Mel. Released as a single on February 9, 2004, the song reached number nine on the UK singles chart and became a top-40 hit in Australia, Ireland, Italy, and Switzerland.

=== Track listings ===
US CD single

1. "It Takes Two" (radio edit)
2. "It Takes Two" (extended mix)
3. "It Takes Two" (original live mix)
4. "Area Code"
5. "Bonus Beats"

US 12-inch single

A. "It Takes Two" (Crooklyn Clan mix)
B. "It Takes Two" (Crooklyn Clan edit)

UK and Australian CD single

1. "It Takes Scoop" (album version) – 4:19
2. "It Takes Scoop" (radio edit) – 2:50
3. "It Takes Scoop" (video CD-ROM)

UK 12-inch single and European CD single

A. "It Takes Scoop" (radio edit) – 2:50
B. "It Takes Scoop" (album version) – 4:19

=== Charts ===
==== Weekly charts ====
"It Takes Two"

Chart (2000)	Peak position
US Hot R&B/Hip-Hop Songs (Billboard)	85
US Hot Rap Songs (Billboard)	12

"It Takes Scoop"

Chart (2004)	Peak position
Australia (ARIA)	23
Australian Urban (ARIA)	7
Belgium (Ultratop 50 Flanders)	44
Belgium (Ultratip Bubbling Under Wallonia)	11
Ireland (IRMA)	15
Italy (FIMI)	39
Scottish Singles Sales (Official Charts)	15
Switzerland (Schweizer Hitparade)	33
UK Singles (Official Charts)	9
UK Hip Hop/R&B (Official Charts)	3

==== Year-end charts ====
Chart (2004)	Position
UK Singles (OCC)	189

=== Release history ===
Region	Date	Format(s)	Label(s)	Ref.
United Kingdom	February 9, 2004	12-inch vinyl; CD; cassette	Def Jam; AV8	
Australia	April 5, 2004	CD	Def Jam; AV8	

== In popular culture ==
- The song was used in the films Love & Basketball (2000), Hey Arnold! The Movie (2002), The Proposal (2009), Iron Man 2 (2010), Focus (2015), Sisters (2015), The Disaster Artist (2017), Bumblebee (2018), Spies in Disguise (2019), and The Venture Bros.: Radiant Is the Blood of the Baboon Heart (2023). The Think break drum break was also used in the opening sequence of the unlicensed NES multicart video game compilation Action 52 (1992). The song was also featured on one of the radio stations in the action-adventure game Grand Theft Auto: San Andreas (2004). In 2018 (aired in 2019) Rob Base himself performed the song on Jersey Shore Family Vacation at Mike "The Situation" Sorrentino and his wife's wedding.

== See also ==
- 1988 in music
