= Think (About It) =

Single by Lyn Collins

from the album Think (About It)
- B-side: "Ain't No Sunshine"
- Released: June 1972
- Genre: Funk
- Length: 3:18
- Label: People; PE 608
- Songwriter: James Brown
- Producer: James Brown

Lyn Collins singles chronology
"Think (About It)" (1972)	"Me and My Baby Got a Good Thing Going" (1972)

Audio video
- "Think (About It)" on YouTube

"Think (About It)" is a funk song recorded by Lyn Collins and released as a single on James Brown's People Records in 1972. The recording was produced by Brown (who also wrote the song) and features instrumental backing from his band The J.B.'s. It was the title track of Collins' 1972 debut album. The song is very popular for its raw drumbeat dressed with tambourine and multiple background vocals, which suggest the song was recorded altogether in one take, with Jabo Starks playing drums. It peaked at No. 9 on the Billboard Best Selling Soul Singles chart and No. 66 on the Hot 100. Owing to the composition, it became a fan favourite and has been featured on various compilation albums posthumously. In the closing lyrics, Collins sings lines from "Think" by The "5" Royales.

"Think (About It)" is among the most sampled songs of all time, with the drum break known as the Think break.

== Sampling ==
"Think (About It)" is one of the most frequently sampled songs in the history of recorded music, having been used well over three thousand times by countless hip hop and dance music artists. The song appeared on the 16th volume of the Ultimate Breaks and Beats compilation series in 1986, shortly before the release of the E-mu SP-1200 sampler in 1987. This resulted in "Think" being sampled heavily in the ensuing years. Both the song's main drumbeat and a vocal passage known as the "Yeah! Woo!" break have been used as samples. Other surrounding vocals such as the lively atmosphere of the band have been used on a loop in hip hop before, such as in the Shy FX radio edit of Wiley's "Never Be Your Woman".

== Well-known cover versions ==
A 2017 recording by Barbara Tucker went to number one on the US Dance Club Songs chart.

== Appearances in other media ==
"Think (About It)" appears on the Action 52 as an intro and Grand Theft Auto: San Andreas soundtrack on the Master Sounds 98.3 station. It is also used in two stage themes of the 1997 video game Street Fighter III: New Generation.

== See also ==
- List of number-one dance singles of 2018 (U.S.)
