= Rob Base & DJ E-Z Rock =

American hip hop duo

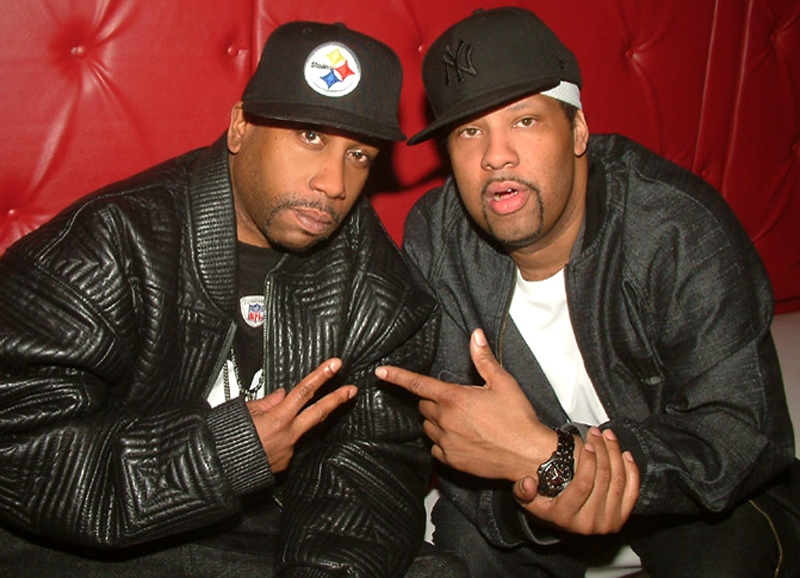
- Rob Base (left) and DJ E-Z Rock in 2006

Background information
- Origin: Manhattan, New York City, U.S.
- Genre: Hip-hop
- Years active: 1985–2014
- Labels: Profile; Funky Base
- Past members: Rob Base; DJ E-Z Rock

Rob Base & DJ E-Z Rock were an American hip-hop duo from Harlem, New York City. Rob Base was the stage name of Robert Ginyard (May 18, 1967 – May 22, 2026) and DJ E-Z Rock was the stage name of Rodney "Skip" Bryce (May 8, 1967 – April 27, 2014). They are best known for the 1988 single "It Takes Two", a "hip-hop staple" that was a top 40 hit and has been certified platinum by the RIAA. That song was a part of the duo's album of the same name, which also has been certified platinum. They are known for being pioneers of the crossover success that rap music would have in the popular music mainstream.

== Career ==
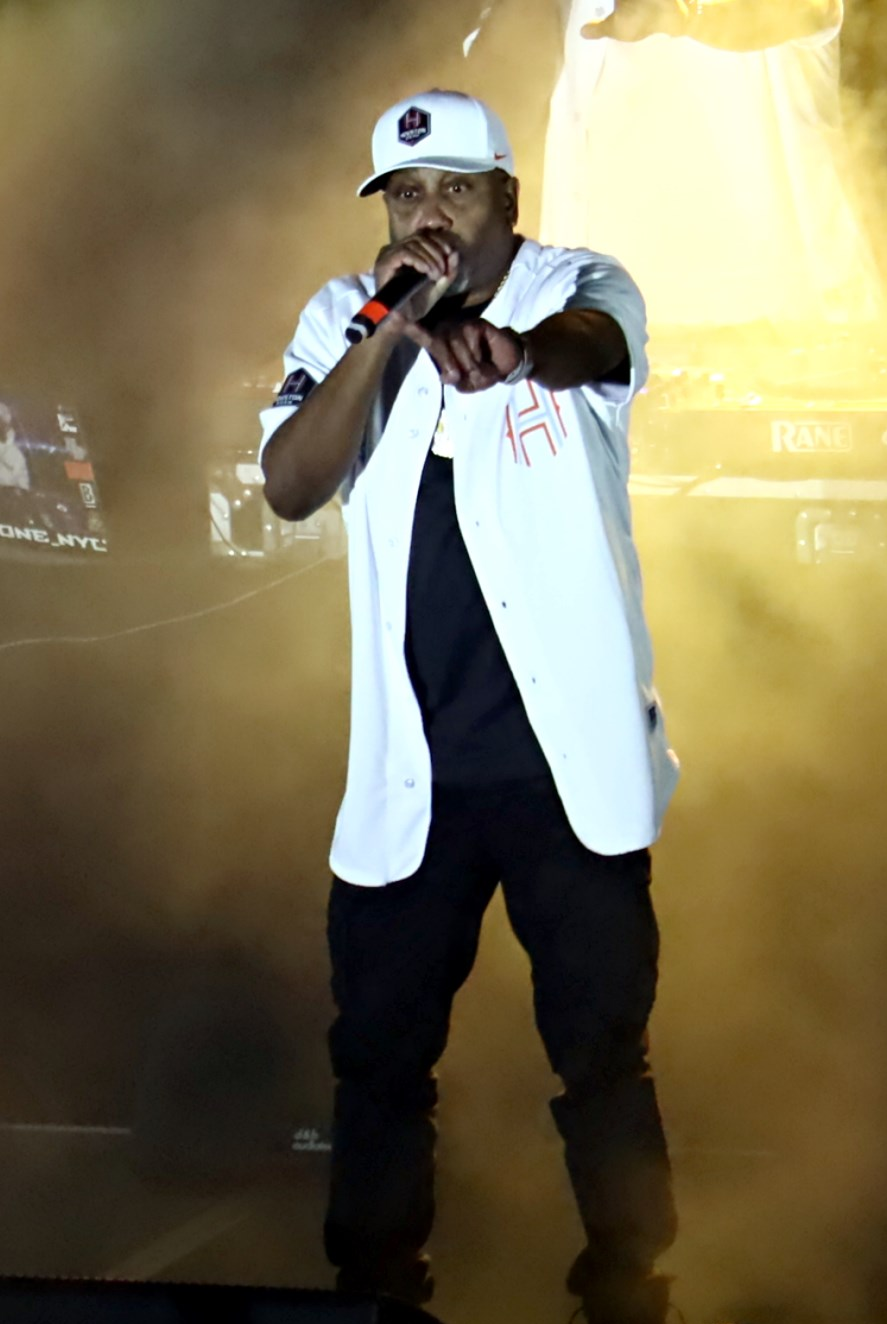
Rob Base performing as a solo artist in October 2023

The duo's first U.S. single and release was "DJ Interview", appearing on World to World, which later got them a recording contract with Profile Records in 1987. The duo was assisted by a long-time friend from New Jersey, producer David Wynn. David Wynn produced three songs on their debut album and five on their sophomore album.

The first Profile release was "It Takes Two". It used multiple samples from the James Brown and Lyn Collins 1972 song "Think (About It)". The track first became a regional hit and then slowly climbed the Billboard Hot 100, picking up a multi-platinum single certification. The song also peaked at No. 3 on the Hot Dance Music/Club Play chart.

Their album It Takes Two was quickly assembled. It produced a notable follow-up hit, "Joy and Pain", which sampled a song of the same name by Maze featuring Frankie Beverly, as well as "Put the Music Where Your Mouth Is" by the Olympic Runners. It reached the top 10 on the dance chart and climbed to No. 58 on the Hot 100. "Get On the Dance Floor", which sampled "Shake Your Body (Down To The Ground)" by The Jacksons, produced by David Wynn, was a track released to clubs in between the two singles. It hit No. 1 on the Hot Dance Music/Club Play chart in 1989. Boosted by those singles, the It Takes Two album went platinum seven times over.

Base responded in 1989 with The Incredible Base, his debut solo album. It did not sell as well as It Takes Two. One song from the album hit the dance chart in late 1989: "Turn It Out (Go Base)", credited only to Rob Base.

In 2008, their song "It Takes Two" was ranked number 37 on VH1's 100 greatest songs of hip hop.

== Personal lives ==
Rob Base was born Robert Ginyard on May 18, 1967. In the fourth grade, he relocated in New York City from the Bronx to Harlem in Manhattan, where he became a classmate of DJ E-Z Rock. He attended Harlem public schools and loved music. Influenced by rap, he performed in talent shows and at as many open mic or hip-hop events as possible. He had his daughter De’Jene in 1989 to his then girlfriend Rhonda. In 1991 Base met April, and in 1992 they had a son Robert Jr. They subsequently took guardianship of April's cousin. Base and April married and remained together until her death in September 2013. Rob Base died from cancer on May 22, 2026, at the age of 59.

DJ E-Z Rock was born Rodney "Skip" Bryce in 1967 and raised in Harlem. He died on April 27, 2014, at the age of 46, after complications from diabetes.

== Discography ==
=== Studio albums ===
Year	Album details	Peak chart positions		Certifications (sales threshold)
Year	Album details	US	US R&B	Certifications (sales threshold)
1988	It Takes Two: Release date: August 9, 1988; Label: Profile Records	31	4	US: Platinum
1994	Break of Dawn: Release date: September 13, 1994; Label: Funky Base Records	—	—	
"—" denotes releases that did not chart

=== Rob Base solo album ===
Year	Album details	Peak chart positions		Certifications (sales threshold)
Year	Album details	US	US R&B	Certifications (sales threshold)
1989	The Incredible Base: Release date: November 21, 1989; Label: Profile Records	50	20	US: Gold
"—" denotes releases that did not chart

=== Singles ===
Year	Single	Peak chart positions					Certifications (sales threshold)	Album
Year	Single	US	US Dance	US Rap	US R&B	UK	Certifications (sales threshold)	Album
1988	"It Takes Two"	36	3	x	17	24	US: Platinum	It Takes Two
1988	"Get on the Dance Floor"	—	1	6	11	14		It Takes Two
1988	"Joy and Pain"	58	9	5	11	47		It Takes Two
1989	"Turn It Out (Go Base)" (as Rob Base)	—	23	4	16	88		The Incredible Base
1990	"Get Up and Have a Good Time" (as Rob Base)	—	—	9	28	—		The Incredible Base
1990	"Outstanding" (as Rob Base)	—	—	14	—	—		The Incredible Base
1994	"Break of Dawn"	—	—	18	110	—		Break of Dawn
1999	"Ready 2 Party"	—	—	—	—	—		(single only)
"—" denotes releases that did not chart. "x" denotes that chart did not exist at the time.

== See also ==
- List of people from Harlem
