= Live 8 concert, London =

2005 benefit concert in London, England

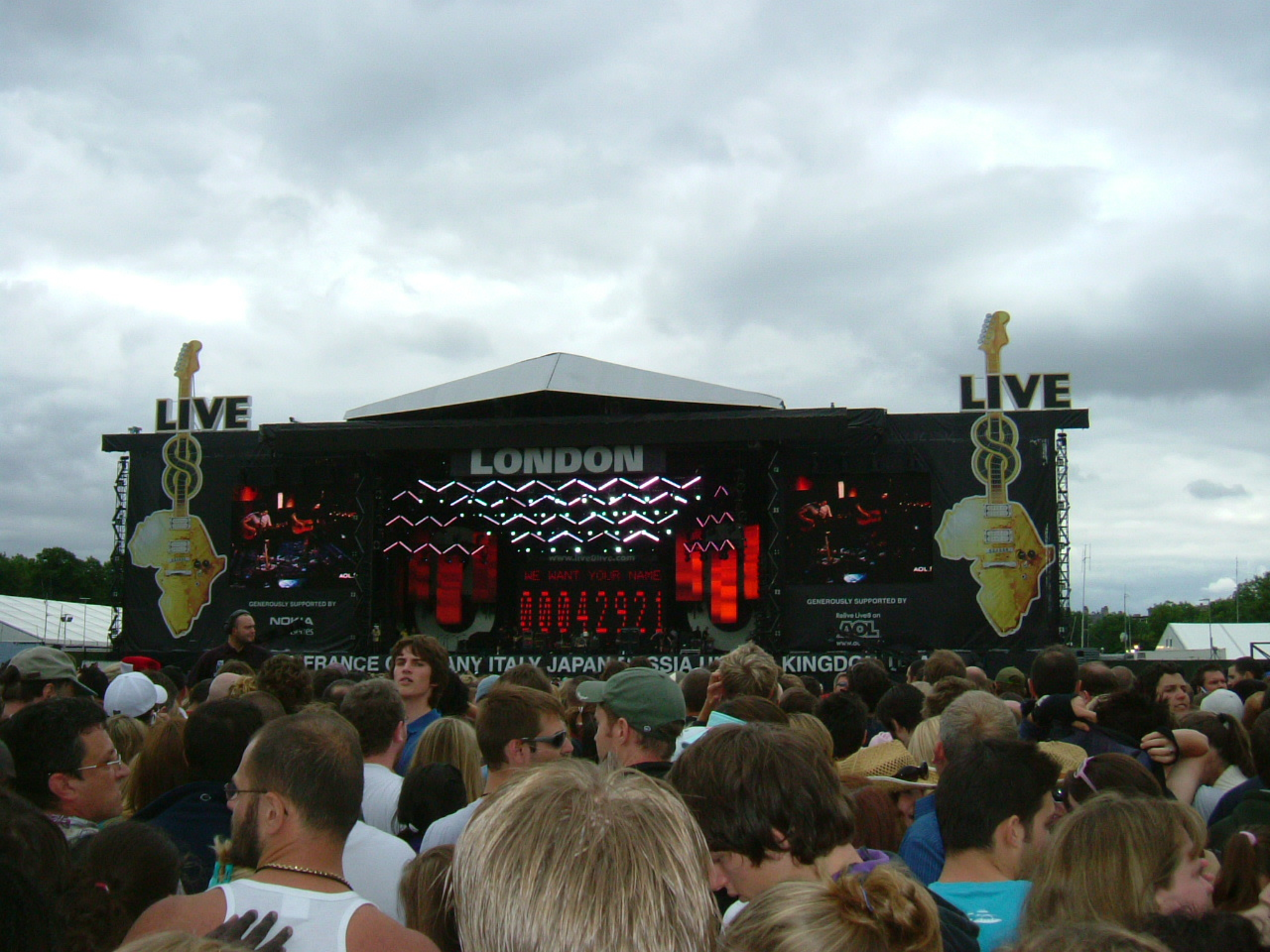
The Live 8 London stage

The main Live 8 concert was held at Hyde Park, London, United Kingdom on 2 July 2005. The event is also referred to as Live 8 London or Live 8 UK.

== Lineup ==
All times BST

- Jonathan Ross (Introduction) (HP 14:00)
- U2 – "Sgt. Pepper's Lonely Hearts Club Band" (with Paul McCartney), "Beautiful Day"/"Blackbird", "Vertigo"/"Feuer Frei!", "One"/"Unchained Melody" (HP 14:03)
- Coldplay – "In My Place/Rockin' All Over the World (chorus)", "Bitter Sweet Symphony" (with Richard Ashcroft), "Fix You" (HP 14:41)
- David Walliams and Matt Lucas as Lou and Andy (presenters) (HP 14:58)
- Elton John – "The Bitch Is Back", "Saturday Night's Alright for Fighting", "Children of the Revolution" (with Pete Doherty) (HP 15:01)
- Bob Geldof (Host) (HP 15:21)
- Bill Gates (presenter) (HP 15:25)
- Dido – "White Flag" (Solo), "Thank You" and "7 Seconds" (both with Youssou N'Dour) (HP 15:30)
- Stereophonics – "The Bartender and the Thief/Ace of Spades (chorus)", "Dakota", "Maybe Tomorrow", "Local Boy in the Photograph" (HP 15:50)
- Ricky Gervais (presenter) (HP 16:11)
- R.E.M. – "Imitation of Life", "Everybody Hurts", "Man on the Moon" (HP 16:15)
- Kofi Annan (presenter) (HP 16:35)
- Ms. Dynamite – "Dy-na-mi-tee", "Redemption Song" (HP 16:39)
- Keane – "Somewhere Only We Know", "Bedshaped" (HP 17:09)
- Will Smith (presenter) (HP 17:29)
- Travis – "Sing", "Side"/"Stayin' Alive", "Why Does It Always Rain on Me?" (HP 17:49)
- Bob Geldof – "I Don't Like Mondays" (HP 18:09)
- Brad Pitt (presenter) (HP 18:19)
- Annie Lennox – "Why", "Little Bird", "Sweet Dreams (Are Made of This)" (HP 18:23)
- UB40 – "Food For Thought", "Who You Fighting For?", "Reasons" (with Hunterz & The Dhol Blasters), "Red Red Wine", "Can't Help Falling in Love" (HP 18:43)
- Snoop Dogg – "Ups & Downs", "Drop It Like It's Hot", "Signs", "The Next Episode", "Who Am I (What's My Name?)" (HP 19:03)
- Razorlight – "1913 Massacre"/"Somewhere Else", "Golden Touch", "In The City" (HP 19:23)
- Bob Geldof and Birhan Woldu (presenters) (HP 19:43)
- Madonna – "Like a Prayer", "Ray of Light", "Music" (HP 19:49)
- Snow Patrol – "Chocolate", "Run" (HP 20:19)
- The Killers – "All These Things That I've Done" (HP 20:39)
- Joss Stone – "Super Duper Love", "I Had a Dream", "Some Kind of Wonderful" (HP 20:49)
- Scissor Sisters – "Laura", "Take Your Mama", "Everybody Wants the Same Thing" (HP 21:09)
- Velvet Revolver – "Do It for the Kids", "Fall To Pieces", "Mountain Song/Slither" (HP 21:29)
- Lenny Henry (presenter) (HP 21:49)
- Sting – "Message in a Bottle", "Driven To Tears", "Every Breath You Take" (with alternative lyrics) (HP 21:55)
- Dawn French (presenter) (HP 22:05)
- Mariah Carey – "Make It Happen", "Hero" (with African Children's Choir), "We Belong Together" (HP 22:09)
- David Beckham (presenter) (HP 22:29)
- Robbie Williams – "We Will Rock You", "Let Me Entertain You", "Feel", "Angels" (HP 22:33)
- Peter Kay – presenter, comedy and a cappella performance of "Is This the Way to Amarillo" (HP 22:53)
- The Who – "Who Are You", "Won't Get Fooled Again" (HP 23:03)
- Pink Floyd – "Speak to Me"/"Breathe" segued with "Breathe (reprise)", "Money", "Wish You Were Here", "Comfortably Numb" (HP 23:23)
- Paul McCartney – "Get Back", "Drive My Car" (with George Michael), "Helter Skelter", "The Long and Winding Road"/"Hey Jude [refrain]" (HP 00:00)

== Performance notes ==
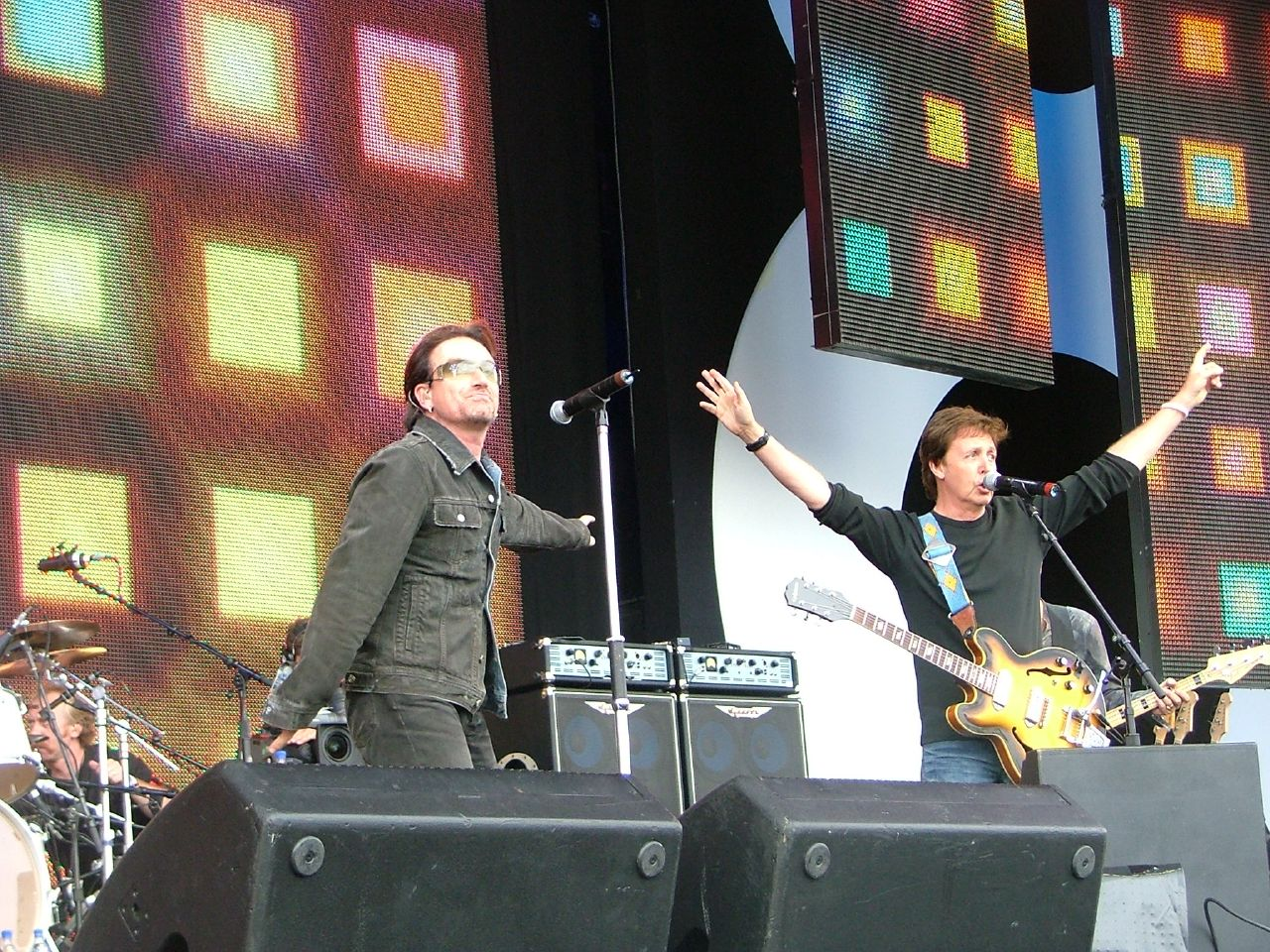
Bono and Paul McCartney

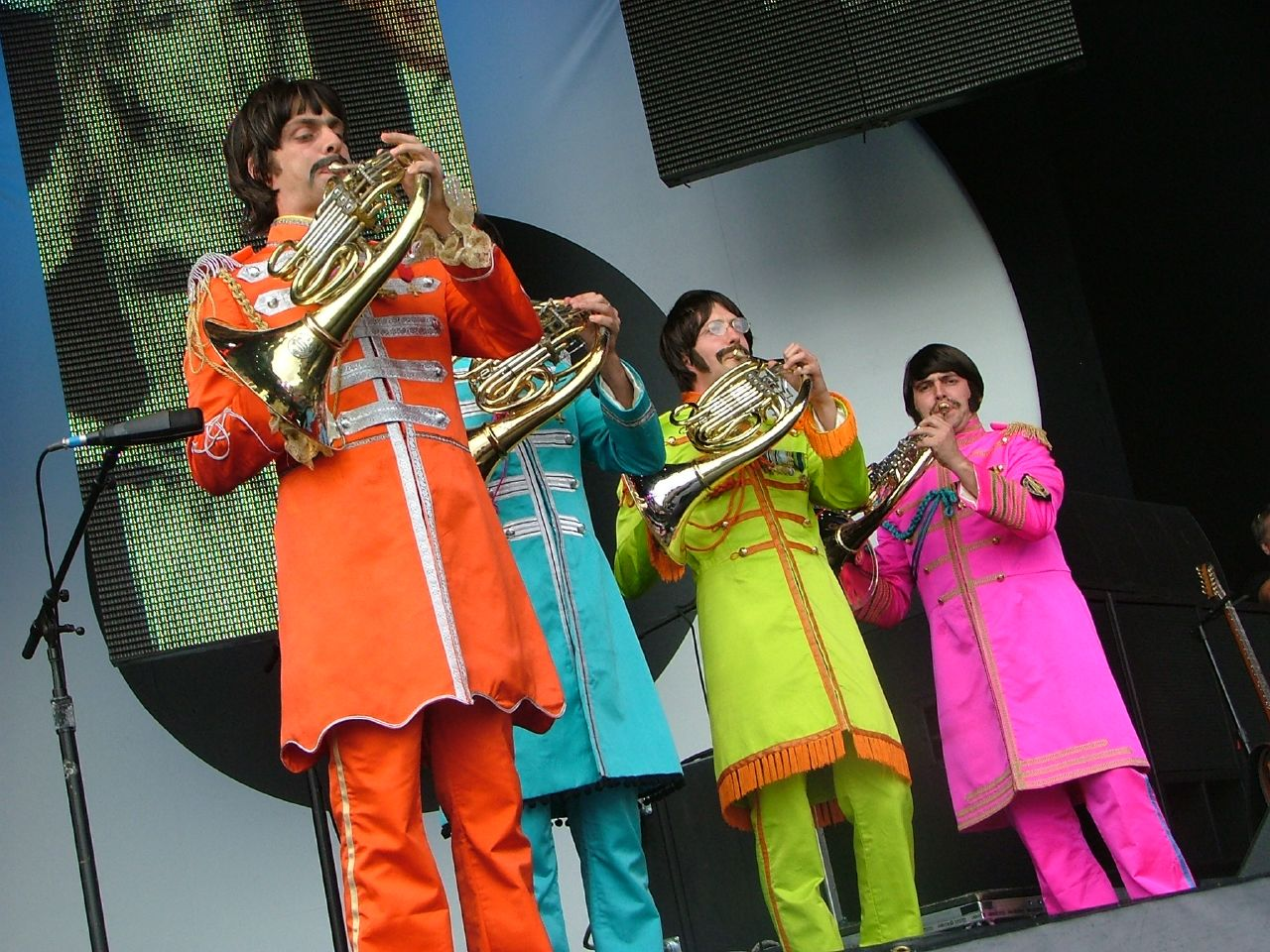
The London French horn free-lancers (Steggall, A Walters, J Walters, Gunner) Sgt. Pepper band

It had been said that Paul McCartney and U2's Bono would wear Sgt. Pepper costumes during their performance together. However, when the show took place, the costumes were worn by a four-piece French horn section of free-lance London area players, Richard Steggall, Adam Walters, Joe Walters, and Matt Gunner.

Immediately following Travis' performance, Bob Geldof told the audience that he "couldn't resist playing on this stage" and played the Boomtown Rats song "I Don't Like Mondays". He had earlier said that he did not deserve to play alongside the scheduled acts.

Both The Cure and Muse were originally listed on the Live 8 website as appearing at the Live 8 London concert. During a BBC TV documentary called The Live 8 Story, the names of both acts are visible on a provisional running order compiled during a production meeting between Geldof, Richard Curtis, Harvey Goldsmith and various other parties. In the end, both acts played the Paris Live 8 concert.

All the songs performed by Sting were sung twenty years before at Live Aid.

Mariah Carey performed a medley of her hits "Make It Happen", "We Belong Together", and "Hero" where she was accompanied by a children's choir.

Some artists already had shows planned for 2 July which they performed after their performances at Live 8. Accordingly, they were not present for the "Hey Jude" grand finale.

The event marked the first performance in 24 years by Pink Floyd's "classic" line-up (Roger Waters, David Gilmour, Richard Wright and Nick Mason). It was also the last time they played together, as keyboardist Wright died in 2008. "It was terrific fun," remarked bassist and singer Waters. "Quite moving. It was good to have that chance to let bygones be bygones, if only for a few days. Dave [Gilmour] sent me an email afterwards saying, 'I am so glad you made that phone call [Waters had called Gilmour at Bob Geldof's behest]. It was fun, wasn't it?' And I said, Yeah, it was. It's all good. There's nothing bad about it."

Originally scheduled to close at 21:30 the concert overran and went on until about 00:30, leaving many in the audience with no means of returning home.

As he had done at Live Aid 20 years previously, Harvey Goldsmith appeared on stage to thank the audience for their patience with the late-running event and to make a closing appeal for people to leave slowly to avoid crushes.

== Coverage ==
=== Television ===
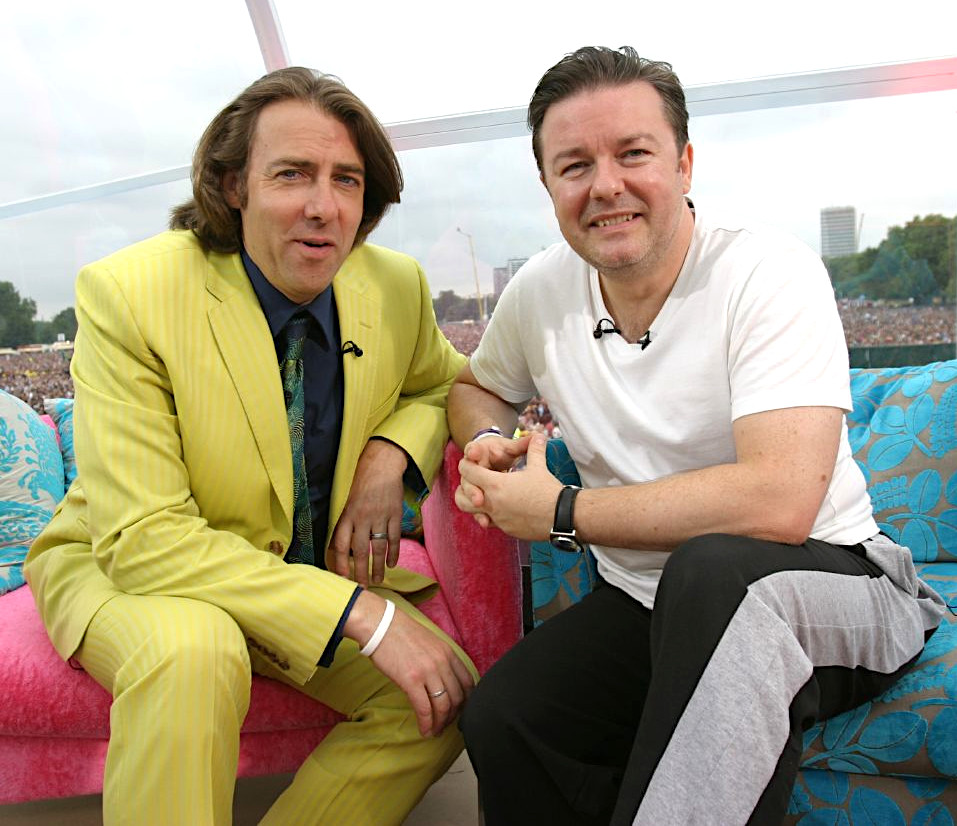
Jonathan Ross and Ricky Gervais in the BBC TV studio at Live 8 with the concert audience in the background

In the United Kingdom, the BBC provided full television coverage, starting on BBC Two from 13:00 and continuing from 18:15 on BBC One, right up to the end of the concert at 00:00. The advertised changeover time was 16:15, disappointing many who had set video recorders accordingly. The coverage was presented by Jonathan Ross, Fearne Cotton, Jo Whiley and Graham Norton. 350 complaints were made to the BBC about swearing before the 21:00 watershed. The BBC apologised.

In Ireland, the concert was broadcast on RTÉ Two, whose coverage ran from 14:00 to 00:00 (except 17:00 to 18:00, when the coverage switched to RTÉ One). The coverage was presented by Dave Fanning and Laura Woods.

In the United States, MTV and VH1 provided intermittent and incomplete live and taped coverage, frequently breaking away mid-song for commercials or commentary by their VJs. This decision drew criticism from numerous viewers who viewed the commentary as being frivolous or inane and would have preferred to see the music acts themselves. However, AOL provided a full webcast of the entire show.

After the criticism from viewers, both VH1 and MTV showed highlights of the Live 8 concerts on 9 July 2005 for 5 hours each without commercial interruption.

In Australia, the concert was broadcast on FOX8 (live) and the Nine Network (highlights).

=== Radio ===
In the UK, there was radio coverage on BBC Radio 1, BBC Radio 2, BBC Radio 5 Live and several local radio stations.

The Radio 1 coverage was presented by Chris Moyles, Scott Mills, Edith Bowman, Colin Murray, Sara Cox and Vernon Kay. While the Radio 2 coverage was presented by Chris Evans, Davina McCall and Dermot O'Leary. Each station focussed on artists who matched the station's playlisting policy and target audience. The Radio 5 Live coverage was presented by Brian Alexander, Phil Williams and Aasmah Mir. The coverage also focused on the Make Poverty History march in Edinburgh and the Wimbledon Women's Singles Final.

Most commercial radio stations in the UK took a programme produced by Capital FM for the day, presented by Ulrika Jonsson.

In the US, XM Satellite Radio broadcast the concert in its entirety.

=== BBC Big Screens ===
The BBC also had live coverage on big screens across the UK.

England

- London – south part of Hyde Park
- Manchester – Exchange Square
- Birmingham – Chamberlain Square
- Birmingham – Cannon Hill Park
- Liverpool – Clayton Square
- Hull – Queen Victoria Square
- Leeds – Millennium Square
- Gateshead – Gateshead International Stadium
- Bournemouth – Meyrick Park
- Plymouth – Armada Way

Wales

- Cardiff – Cooper's Field, Bute Park
- Wrexham – Queens Square

Northern Ireland

- Belfast – Custom House Square

Scotland

- Inverness – Caledonian Stadium

Channel Islands

- St. Helier, Jersey – Peoples Park
- Guernsey – L'Eree
