= So Fly (213 song) =

Single by 213

from the album The Hard Way
- Released: July 6, 2004
- Recorded: 2002–2003
- Genre: West Coast hip hop; G-funk
- Length: 4:07
- Label: TVT
- Songwriters: Calvin Broadus; Warren Griffin III; Nathaniel Dwayne Hale; Melissa Elliott; Zyah Ahmonuel
- Producers: Spike & Jamahl; Missy Elliott

213 singles chronology
"So Fly" (2004)	"Groupie Luv" (2004)

"So Fly" is a song performed by American Hip Hop supergroup 213, which consisted of Snoop Dogg, Warren G and Nate Dogg. It was released on July 6, 2004 as a promotional single off their studio album The Hard Way, with the record label TVT Records. The song was produced by Spike & Jamahl along with Missy Elliott. It uses the same backing track as another Elliott-produced song, "So Gone," which had been released by Monica the previous year.

== Track listing ==
CD Single

1. So Fly — 4:07

== Charts ==
Chart (2004)	Peak position
US Bubbling Under Hot 100 (Billboard)	2
US Hot 100 Airplay (Billboard)	79
US R&B/Hip-Hop Airplay (Billboard)	36
US Hot R&B/Hip-Hop Songs (Billboard)	39
US Hot Rap Songs (Billboard)	18
US Rhythmic Airplay (Billboard)	24
