= 213 (group) =

American hip hop group from California

- Origin: Long Beach, California, U.S.
- Genres: West Coast hip hop; gangsta rap; G-funk
- Years active: 1992–1994, 1998–2011
- Labels: TVT; Doggystyle
- Spinoffs: D.P.G.C.
- Past members: Warren G; Snoop Dogg; Nate Dogg (deceased)

213 (pronounced "Two One Three") was an American hip-hop group from Long Beach, California, composed of Snoop Dogg, Warren G and Nate Dogg. The name derives from Los Angeles' original telephone area code 213, which served the city of Long Beach at the time of the group's formation (it later became area code 562).

== Background ==
Their breakthrough song was the major hit "Ain't No Fun (If the Homies Can't Have None)" from Snoop Dogg's solo debut Doggystyle, which also featured Kurupt of Tha Dogg Pound. In 1994, they released the St. Ides EP. Since then, they continued to collaborate on each other's solo projects, but they did not release any new material as a group. They got their name from Oakland rap group 415 as paying homage. August 17, 2004, they released their only studio album The Hard Way, which reached #4 in the U.S. Billboard 200 charts. It featured the singles, "Groupie Luv" and "So Fly".

On March 15, 2011, Nate Dogg died in Long Beach, California, from complications of multiple strokes, effectively disbanding 213.

== Discography ==
=== Albums ===
List of collaborative albums, with selected chart positions
Title	Album details	Peak chart positions											Sales	Certifications (sales threshold)
Title	Album details	US	US Ind	US R&B/HH	AUS	BEL	CAN	DUT	GER	NZ	SWI	UK R&B	Sales	Certifications (sales threshold)
The Hard Way	Released: August 17, 2004; Genre: West Coast hip hop, Gangsta rap, G-funk, R&B; Label: TVT, Doggystyle; Format: CD, LP, Cassette, Digital download	4	1	1	50	57	3	57	34	21	33	35	US: 500,000	MC: Gold

=== Video albums ===
List of video albums, with selected information
Title	Album details
213 – Live in Las Vegas	Released: April 8, 2009; Label: Black Dragon Entertainment; Format: digital download

=== Singles ===
List of singles, with selected chart positions and certifications, showing year released and album name
Title	Year	Peak chart positions					Certifications (sales threshold)	Album
Title	Year	US	US R&B/HH	US Rap	AUS	NZ	Certifications (sales threshold)	Album
"So Fly"	2004	—^{[A]}	39	18	—	—		The Hard Way
"Groupie Luv"	2004	—^{[B]}	48	24	39	16		The Hard Way
"—" denotes a recording that did not chart or was not released in that territory.

=== As featured artist ===
List of singles as featured artist, with selected chart positions and certifications, showing year released and album name
Title	Year	Peak chart positions											Certifications	Album
Title	Year	US	US R&B	US Rap	AUS	FRA	GER	IRE	NLD	NZ	SWI	UK	Certifications	Album
"Indo Smoke" (Mista Grimm featuring Warren G and Nate Dogg)	1993	56	63	12	—	—	—	—	—	—	—	—		Poetic Justice soundtrack
"The Next Episode" (Dr. Dre featuring Snoop Dogg, Kurupt and Nate Dogg)	2000	23	11	9	—	22	34	11	26	—	34	3	BPI: 2× Platinum; BVMI: Gold; RMNZ: 4× Platinum	2001
"The Streets" (WC featuring Snoop Dogg and Nate Dogg)	2002	81	43	20	—	—	—	38	—	—	—	48		Ghetto Heisman
"Wake Up" (Shade Sheist featuring Nate Dogg and Warren G)	2002	—	53	—	—	—	—	—	—	—	—	—		Informal Introduction
"Real Soon" (DPGC featuring Snoop Dogg and Nate Dogg)	2005	—	103	—	49	—	—	—	—	—	—	—		Welcome to tha Chuuuch: Da Album
"—" denotes a recording that did not chart or was not released in that territory.

=== Other charted songs ===
List of other charted songs, showing year released and album name
Title	Year	Peak chart positions	Album
Title	Year	US R&B/HH	Album
"Dolla Bill"	2004	—^{[C]}	Non-album song
"—" denotes a recording that did not chart or was not released in that territory.

=== Guest appearances ===
List of non-single guest appearances, with all performing artists, showing year released and album name
Title	Year	Other Performer(s)	Group performers	Album
"Deeez Nuuuts"	1992	Dr. Dre, Daz Dillinger	Warren G, Snoop Dogg, Nate Dogg	The Chronic
"Big Pimpin'"	1994	Daz Dillinger, Big Pimpin' Delemond	Snoop Dogg, Nate Dogg	Above the Rim soundtrack
"St. Ides in the LBC"	1994	None	Nate Dogg, Snoop Dogg	St. Ides '94
"A Doggz Day Afternoon"	1995	Tha Dogg Pound	Nate Dogg, Snoop Dogg	Dogg Food
"Let's Play House (original version)"	1995	Tha Dogg Pound, Michel'le, Big Pimpin' Delemond	Nate Dogg, Warren G	Doggy Bag
"O.G.	1998	Daz Dillinger	Snoop Dogg, Nate Dogg	Retaliation, Revenge and Get Back
"We Came to Rock Ya Body"	1998	The Click, Tha Dogg Pound	Snoop Dogg, Nate Dogg	Boss Ballin' Vol. 2: The Mob Bosses
"Protector's of 1472"	1998	Jermaine Dupri, R.O.C.	Warren G, Snoop Dogg	Life in 1472
"Interlude"	1998	Kid Capri	Snoop Dogg, Warren G	Soundtrack to the Streets
"Ghetto Millionaire"	1999	C-Murder, Kurupt	Nate Dogg, Snoop Dogg	Bossalinie
"Neva Gonna Give It Up"	1999	Kurupt, Big Tray Deee, Soopafly	Snoop Dogg, Nate Dogg, Warren G	Tha Streetz Iz a Mutha
"No More Games"	2000	Prince Ital Joe	Snoop Dogg, Nate Dogg	Thug Lifestyles
"Curious"	2000	Doggy's Angels	Snoop Dogg, Nate Dogg	Pleezbaleevit!
"Hey Y'all"	2002	Eve	Snoop Dogg, Nate Dogg	Eve-Olution
"Bitches Ain't Shit"	2004	Lil Jon & the East Side Boyz, Oobie, Suga Free	Nate Dogg, Snoop Dogg	Crunk Juice
"Eff Grandad"	2007	Lethal Injection Crew, Busta Rhymes	Nate Dogg, Snoop Dogg	Hip-Hop Docktrine 2: The Official Boondocks Mixtape
"Number 1"	2007	Soopafly, Daz Dillinger	Nate Dogg, Snoop Dogg	Bangin Westcoast
"L.A."	2008	Nelly	Snoop Dogg, Nate Dogg	Brass Knuckles

== Notes ==
- A "Fly" did not enter the Billboard Hot 100, but peaked at number 2 on the Bubbling Under Hot 100 Singles chart, which acts as an extension to the Hot 100.
- B "Groupie Luv" did not enter the Billboard Hot 100, but peaked at number 6 on the Bubbling Under Hot 100 Singles chart, which acts as an extension to the Hot 100.
- C "Dolla Bill" did not enter the Billboard Hot R&B/Hip-Hop Songs, but peaked at number 11 on the Bubbling Under R&B/Hip-Hop chart, which acts as an extension to the Hot R&B/Hip-Hop Songs.
