= Let's Get Blown =

2004 single by Snoop Dogg

Single by Snoop Dogg featuring Pharrell

from the album R&G (Rhythm & Gangsta): The Masterpiece
- Released: December 13, 2004
- Genre: Hip-hop; R&B; G-funk
- Length: 4:40
- Label: Doggystyle; Star Trak; Geffen
- Songwriters: Calvin Broadus; Pharrell Williams; Chad Hugo; Steve Arrington; Mark Adams; Raye Turner; Steve Washington; Danny Webster
- Producer: The Neptunes

Snoop Dogg singles chronology
"Drop It Like It's Hot" (2004)	"Let's Get Blown" (2004)	"Signs" (2005)

Pharrell Williams singles chronology
"Drop It Like It's Hot" (2004)	"Let's Get Blown" (2004)	"Wanna Love You Girl" (2005)

"Let's Get Blown" is a song by American rapper Snoop Dogg featuring American musician Pharrell Williams. It was released on December 13, 2004, as the second single released from the former's seventh studio album R&G (Rhythm & Gangsta): The Masterpiece (2004). It was produced by the Neptunes (Williams and Chad Hugo) and features additional uncredited vocals from American singer Keyshia Cole.

== Composition and recording ==
"Let's Get Blown" is a hip-hop mid-tempo that features beats and influences of funk and G-funk music. The song samples and contains interpolations from Slave's "Watching You", which was also interpolated in Snoop Dogg's "Gin and Juice". It was recorded by Andrew Coleman and Phil Tan at Record Plant Studios in Los Angeles.

== Music video ==
The video was first aired in the week of February 21, 2005. It was 27th on LAUNCH Music Videos Top 100 in January 2005 and 59th on MTV's Top 100 of 2005 video list in December. The music video was directed by Paul Hunter.

== Awards ==
In 2005, the Neptunes were nominated for Grammy Award for Producer of the Year, Non-Classical in the Rap category for composing this song.

== Commercial performance ==
"Let's Get Blown" is one of Snoop Dogg's biggest hits in the United Kingdom, peaking at number 13.

== Live performance ==
The song was performed live at The Tonight Show with Jay Leno on January 20, 2005.

== Track listings ==
US CD single
No.	Title	Length
1.	"Let's Get Blown" (radio)	4:42
2.	"Let's Get Blown" (album)	4:40
3.	"Let's Get Blown" (instrumental)	4:40

UK CD single
No.	Title	Length
1.	"Let's Get Blown"	4:40
2.	"Ups & Downs"	4:07
3.	"Let's Get Blown" (instrumental)	4:40
4.	"Let's Get Blown" (video)	4:58

UK EP
No.	Title	Length
1.	"Let's Get Blown" (album version)	4:41
2.	"Ups & Downs" (featuring Bee Gees)	4:07
3.	"Let's Get Blown" (instrumental)	4:41

== Charts ==
=== Weekly charts ===
Chart (2005)	Peak position
Belgium (Ultratop 50 Flanders)	42
Belgium (Ultratip Bubbling Under Wallonia)	2
Finland (Suomen virallinen lista)	18
Ireland (IRMA)	16
Italy (FIMI)	24
Netherlands (Dutch Top 40)	34
Netherlands (Single Top 100)	35
New Zealand (Recorded Music NZ)	19
Switzerland (Schweizer Hitparade)	22
Scotland Singles (Official Charts)	21
UK Singles (Official Charts)	13
UK Hip Hop/R&B (Official Charts)	7
US Billboard Hot 100	54
US Hot R&B/Hip-Hop Songs (Billboard)	19
US Hot Rap Songs (Billboard)	12
US Rhythmic Airplay (Billboard)	26

=== Year-end charts ===
Chart (2005)	Position
UK Urban (Music Week)	16
US Hot R&B/Hip-Hop Songs (Billboard)	94

== Release history ==
Region	Date	Format(s)	Label(s)	Ref.
United States	December 13, 2004	Rhythmic contemporary; urban contemporary radio	Doggystyle; Star Trak; Geffen	
United Kingdom	February 21, 2005	CD	Doggystyle; Star Trak; Geffen	
