= Paul Hunter (director) =

American director

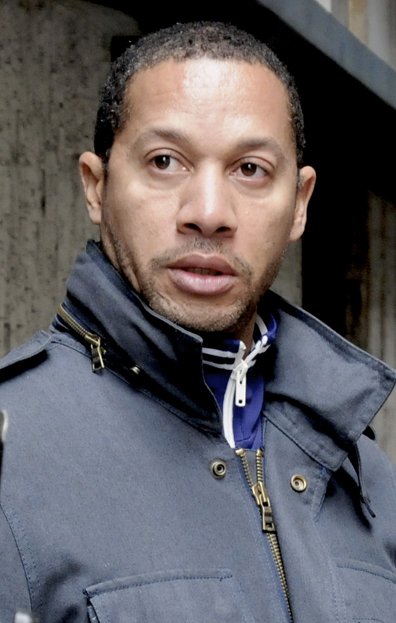
- Born: Los Angeles, California, U.S.
- Occupations: Film director, screenwriter, music video director,
- Years active: 1995–present
- Website: Official

Paul Hunter is an Emmy-nominated American filmmaker and co-founder of commercial production company PRETTYBIRD, which represents directors including Melina Matsoukas and the Oscar-winning duo Daniels.

== Career ==
Hunter has directed global commercial campaigns for Nike, Sony, Adidas, Apple, Audi, Microsoft, Bacardi, McDonalds, the Los Angeles Rams, and T-Mobile. In 2001, he was nominated for an Emmy Award for Nike's Freestyle commercial.

In 2018, Billboard included four of Hunter's music videos on their list of "The 100 Greatest Music Videos of the 21st Century: Critics’ Picks". In 2004, the Washington Post called Hunter one of the "most seminal names among black hip-hop directors."

== Selected music video credits ==
Year	Artist	Song	Notes
1995	Vybe	"Take It to The Front"	
1996	Twinz	"Eastside LB"	
1996	Keith Sweat	"Twisted"	
1996	Keith Sweat	"Nobody"	
1996	Keith Sweat	"Just a Touch"	
1996	Snoop Dogg	"Santa Claus Goes Straight to the Ghetto"	
1996	Aaliyah	"One in a Million"	
1996	Aaliyah	"Got to Give It Up"	
1996	Erykah Badu	"On & On"	MVPA Award for Best Urban/R&B Video; Nominated – MTV Video Music Award for Best Female Video; Nominated – MTV Video Music Award for Best R&B Video
1997	Aaliyah	"One in a Million" (Remix)	Video features singers Ginuwine, Missy Elliott, and producer Timbaland
1997	Snoop Dogg	"Vapors"	
1997	Whitney Houston	"Step by Step"	
1997	Zhané	"Request Line"	
1997	Warren G	"I Shot the Sheriff"	
1997	Heavy D	"Big Daddy"	
1997	Adriana Evans	"Seein' Is Believing"	
1997	Mary J. Blige and Nas	"Love Is All We Need"	
1997	Brownstone	"5 Miles to Empty"	
1997	Scarface featuring Makaveli and Johnny P	"Smile"	
1997	Zhane	"Crush"	
1997	Lauryn Hill	"The Sweetest Thing"	
1997	Blackstreet featuring Ol' Dirty Bastard, Slash, and Fishbone	"Fix"	
1997	Tamia	"Make Tonight Beautiful"	
1997	Mariah Carey	"Honey"	
1997	Mariah Carey featuring Puff Daddy, The Lox, and Mase	"Honey" (Bad Boy Remix)	Nominated – MTV Video Music Award for Best Female Video
1997	Puff Daddy featuring Mase	"Can't Nobody Hold Me Down"	
1997	Pras featuring Mýa Ol’ Dirty Bastard	"Ghetto Superstar (That Is What You Are)"	
1997	Puff Daddy featuring The Lox and Lil' Kim	"It's All About the Benjamins"	
1997	The Black Eyed Peas	"Joints & Jams"	
1997	Puff Daddy featuring The Notorious B.I.G. and Mase	"Been Around the World"	
1997	The Notorious B.I.G.	"Hypnotize"	MTV Video Music Award for Best Rap Video
1997	New Kids on the Block	"What It Is"	
1997	LL Cool J	"Phenomenon"	
1997	Boyz II Men	"4 Seasons of Loneliness"	
1997	Mack 10 featuring Snoop Dogg and Ice Cube	"Only in California"	
1997	Laurneá	"Infatuation"	
1997	LSG featuring Busta Rhymes and LL Cool J and MC Lyte	"Curious"	
1997	Salt-N-Pepa	"Gitty Up"	
1998	Jermaine Dupri featuring Da Brat and Usher	"The Party Continues"	
1998	Queen Latifah	"Paper"	
1998	LL Cool J	"Hot Hot Hot"	
1998	Joydrop	"Beautiful"	
1998	Babyface	"You Were There"	
1998	Brandy featuring Mase	"Top of the World"	
1998	Boyz II Men	"Can't Let Her Go"	
1998	Tamia	"Imagination"	
1998	Ice Cube	"We Be Clubbin'"	
1998	Janet Jackson	"I Get Lonely"	
1998	Janet Jackson featuring Blackstreet	"I Get Lonely" (TNT Remix)	
1998	Busta Rhymes	"Turn It Up (Remix)/Fire It Up"	
1998	Usher	"My Way"	
1998	Missy Elliott featuring Timbaland and Mocha	"Hit Em wit da Hee"	
1998	Marilyn Manson	"The Dope Show"	MVPA Award for Rock Video of the Year; MVPA Award for Best Direction of a Music Video
1998	Marilyn Manson	"I Don't Like the Drugs (But the Drugs Like Me)"	
1998	Everclear	"Father of Mine"	
1998	A Tribe Called Quest	"Find a Way"	
1998	Hole	"Malibu"	
1998	Lenny Kravitz	"Fly Away"	Nominated – MTV Video Music Award for Best Male Video; Nominated – MTV Video Music Award for Best Rock Video
1999	Faith Evans featuring Puff Daddy	"All Night Long"	
1999	Warren G featuring Mack 10	"I Want It All"	
1999	Keith Sweat	"I'm Not Ready"	
1999	Matchbox Twenty	"Back 2 Good"	
1999	Will Smith featuring Dru Hill and Kool Moe Dee	"Wild Wild West"	Nominated – MTV Video Music Award for Video of the Year; Nominated – MTV Video Music Award for Best Video from a Film
1999	Jennifer Lopez	"If You Had My Love"	Nominated – MTV Video Music Award for Best Female Video; Nominated – MTV Video Music Award for Best New Artist; Nominated – MTV Video Music Award for Best Pop Video; Nominated – MTV Video Music Award for Best Dance Video
1999	Lenny Kravitz	"American Woman"	
1999	Enrique Iglesias	"Bailamos"	
1999	TLC	"Unpretty"	Nominated – Grammy Award for Best Music Video
1999	Reel Tight	"Reasons"	
1999	AMyth	1, 2, 3	
1999	Puff Daddy featuring Mario Winans	"Best Friend"	
1999	D'Angelo	"Untitled (How Does It Feel)"	MVPA Award for Best Direction of a Male Video; Nominated – MTV Video Music Award for Video of the Year; Nominated – MTV Video Music Award for Best Male Video; Nominated – MTV Video Music Award for Best R&B Video; Nominated – MTV Video Music Award for Best Direction
2000	Jennifer Lopez featuring Big Pun and Fat Joe	"Feelin' So Good"	
2000	Will Smith	"Freakin' It"	
2000	Brian McKnight	"Stay or Let It Go"	
2000	Kelis	"Get Along with You"	
2000	Dr. Dre featuring Snoop Dogg	"The Next Episode"	
2000	Eminem	"The Way I Am"	
2000	Christina Aguilera	"Come On Over Baby (All I Want Is You)"	
2000	Lenny Kravitz	"Again"	Nominated – MTV Video Music Award for Best Male Video
2000	Deftones	"Back to School (Mini Maggit)"	
2000	Tamia	"Stranger in My House"	
2000	A Perfect Circle	"3 Libras"	
2000	Faith Hill	"Where Are You, Christmas?"	
2000	Jennifer Lopez	"Love Don't Cost a Thing"	Nominated – MTV Video Music Award for Best Female Video
2001	Jay-Z featuring R. Kelly	"Guilty Until Proven Innocent"	MVPA Awards – Hollywood Digital Award for Rap Video of the Year
2001	Aaliyah	"We Need a Resolution"	
2001	Christina Aguilera, Mýa, Lil' Kim, and P!nk	"Lady Marmalade"	MTV Video Music Award for Video of the Year; MTV Video Music Award for Best Video from a Film; Nominated – MTV Video Music Award for Best Pop Video; Nominated – MTV Video Music Award for Best Dance Video
2001	Sunshine Anderson	"Lunch or Dinner"	
2001	Michael Jackson	"You Rock My World"	Video features actors Marlon Brando, Chris Tucker, Michael Madsen, Billy Drago and introducing Kishaya Dudley
2003	Eminem	"Superman"	
2003	Britney Spears featuring Madonna	"Me Against the Music"	
2003	Justin Timberlake	"Señorita"	Nominated – MTV Video Music Award for Best Male Video
2003	Justin Timberlake	"I'm Lovin' It"	
2003	Tamia	"Officially Missing You"	
2003	Ashanti	"Rock wit U (Awww Baby)"	Nominated – MTV Video Music Award for Best R&B Video
2003	Joe Budden featuring Busta Rhymes	"Fire (Yes, Yes Y'all)"	Co-directed with Kevin Hunter
2003	Mýa	"My Love Is Like...Wo"	
2003	Tyrese	"Signs of Love Making"	
2003	Pharrell featuring Jay-Z	"Frontin'"	Video features models Lanisha Cole and Lauren London
2004	N.E.R.D	"Maybe"	
2004	Van Hunt	"Down Here in Hell (With You)"	
2004	Mos Def	"Sex, Love & Money"	
2004	Snoop Dogg featuring Pharrell	"Drop It Like It's Hot"	Nominated – MTV Video Music Award for Video of the Year; Nominated – MTV Video Music Award for Best Hip-Hop Video
2005	Snoop Dogg featuring Pharrell	"Let's Get Blown"	
2005	Snoop Dogg featuring Charlie Wilson and Justin Timberlake	"Signs"	
2005	Gwen Stefani	"Hollaback Girl"	Nominated – MTV Video Music Award for Video of the Year; Nominated – MTV Video Music Award for Best Female Video; Nominated – MTV Video Music Award for Best Pop Video; Nominated – MVPA Award for Best Pop Video
2005	Will Smith	"Switch"	
2005	Will Smith	"Party Starter"	
2005	The Pussycat Dolls featuring Busta Rhymes	"Don't Cha"	
2005	Stevie Wonder	"So What the Fuss"	MVPA Award for R&B Video of the Year
2005	Common	"Be"	
2005	Pharrell featuring Gwen Stefani	"Can I Have It Like That"	
2005	Warren G featuring Snoop Dogg, Ice Cube, and B-Real	"Get U Down"	
2005	Mariah Carey	"Don't Forget About Us"	
2006	Mariah Carey featuring Snoop Dogg	"Say Somethin'"	
2006	Jamie Foxx featuring Twista	"DJ Play a Love Song"	
2006	Jamie Foxx	"Extravaganza"	
2006	Mary J. Blige featuring U2	"One"	
2006	Outkast	"Idlewild Blue (Don'tchu Worry 'Bout Me)"	
2006	Warren G featuring Nate Dogg	"I Need a Light"	
2006	Justin Timberlake featuring T.I.	"My Love"	MVPA Award for Best Direction of a Male Artist
2007	Nicole Scherzinger	"Whatever U Like"	
2009	Chester French	"She Loves Everybody"	
2009	Mishon	"Just a Kiss"	
2009	Jeremih	"Birthday Sex"	
2009	Keri Hilson	"Slow Dance"	
2009	The All-American Rejects	"I Wanna"	
2009	Snoop Dogg featuring The-Dream	"Gangsta Luv"	
2010	Kesha	"Take It Off"	Co-directed by Dori Oskowitz
2010	Maroon 5	"Give a Little More"	
2010	N.E.R.D	"Hypnotize U"	
2011	Lenny Kravitz	"Stand"	
2011	Nicole Scherzinger	"Right There"	
2011	Jennifer Lopez	"Papi"	
2012	Jennifer Lopez featuring Pitbull	"Dance Again"	
2015	Tyrese	"Shame"	
2015	Pharrell	"Freedom"	Nominated – Grammy Award for Best Music Video
2018	Justin Timberlake	"Man of the Woods"	
2026	Angelique Kidjo featuring Pharrell Williams and Quavo	"Bando"	

== Filmography ==
- Bulletproof Monk (2003)
- Government Cheese (2025)

== Awards ==
Commercials

- 2010 - London International Advertising Awards - Bronze Television/Cinema/ Digital/Web/Mobile - Axe: "Destiny" (Director)
- 2010 - Cannes Lion International Festival of Creativity - Bronze Award: Product & Service/Cosmetics & Beauty - Axe: "Destiny" (Director)
- 2013 - Samsung Galaxy Note 3 TV Commercial / Digital Short Film (Director)
