= Groupie Luv =

Single by 213

from the album The Hard Way
- Released: August 4, 2004
- Recorded: 2002–2004
- Genre: West Coast hip hop; G-funk
- Length: 3:52
- Label: TVT
- Songwriters: Calvin Broadus; Warren Griffin III; Nathaniel Dwayne Hale; Mark Jordan; Bennie Maupin; Harvey Mason; Herbie Hancock; Paul Jackson
- Producer: DJ Pooh

213 singles chronology
"So Fly" (2004)	"Groupie Luv" (2004)

"Groupie Luv" is a song by performed by American hip hop supergroup 213, which consisted of Snoop Dogg, Warren G and Nate Dogg. It was released on 2004 as the second single off their studio album The Hard Way, with the record label TVT Records. The song was produced by DJ Pooh.

== Music video ==
The video of the song was produced by Chris Robinson and shot at the house of Snoop Dogg.

== Track listing ==
- CD Single
1. Groupie Luv (Clean) — 3:53
2. Groupie Luv (Street) — 3:53
3. Groupie Luv (Instrumental) — 3:53

== Charts ==
Chart (2004)	Peak position
Australia (ARIA)	39
Australian Urban (ARIA)	12
New Zealand (Recorded Music NZ)	16
US Bubbling Under Hot 100 (Billboard)	6
US Hot 100 Airplay (Billboard)	26
US Hot R&B/Hip-Hop Songs (Billboard)	48
US R&B/Hip-Hop Airplay (Billboard)	47
US Hot Rap Songs (Billboard)	24
US Rhythmic Airplay (Billboard)	23
