= Signs (Snoop Dogg song) =

2005 single by Snoop Dogg

Single by Snoop Dogg featuring Charlie Wilson and Justin Timberlake

from the album R&G (Rhythm & Gangsta): The Masterpiece
- Released: April 25, 2005
- Length: 3:56
- Label: Doggystyle; Star Trak; Geffen
- Songwriters: Calvin Broadus; Pharrell Williams; Chad Hugo; L. Simmons; R. Taylor; Justin Timberlake; Charlie Wilson
- Producer: The Neptunes

Snoop Dogg singles chronology
"Let's Get Blown" (2004)	"Signs" (2005)	"Ups & Downs" (2005)

Justin Timberlake singles chronology
"I'm Lovin' It" (2003)	"Signs" (2005)	"SexyBack" (2006)

Music video
- "Signs" on YouTube

"Signs" is a song by American West Coast hip hop recording artist Snoop Dogg. The song was produced by the Neptunes and features guest appearances by Charlie Wilson and Justin Timberlake, and it interpolates some lyrics from The Gap Band's 1982 "Early in the Morning" and Cheryl Lynn's 1978 "Got to Be Real".

"Signs" was released in April 2005 as the third single released from Snoop Dogg's seventh studio album, R&G (Rhythm & Gangsta): The Masterpiece (2004). The song became a number-one hit in Australia, entered the top 10 in several European countries, and peaked at number 46 in the United States. Snoop Dogg performed the song at the Live 8 concert in London, England, on July 2, 2005, along with a few of his other hits.

== Themes ==
The song looks at the topic of romance from several points of view, and in doing so, touches on other subjects such as illegal drugs, the city of Los Angeles, the perceived glamour of gang culture, and the lavish, hedonistic lifestyle led by many rappers and musicians.

The chorus, sung by Justin Timberlake, is about the moment when a man thinks a woman to whom he is sexually attracted may also be attracted to him. The man second-guesses what he thinks he has seen, expressing a wish that love (personified as Cupid in classical fashion) should not play around with his emotions. Meanwhile, another male observer (voiced by Snoop Dogg) opines that the Timberlake character is out of his element and should not bother attempting to further relations between himself and the object of his affection, since he lacks the necessary gangster credentials.

The verses of the song, rapped by Snoop Dogg, mainly following Snoop Dogg's attempts to charm a woman or women. The first verse starts with a brief introduction boasting about the song's hit potential, due to the involvement of Snoop himself and producers the Neptunes. Snoop then appears to become distracted by a passing woman, and attempts to charm her by offering to procure cannabis for her and mentioning his gang, the Crips. In the second verse, Snoop boasts about the glamorous side of his home city, Los Angeles. In the third verse (or bridging section), he redoubles his efforts at seduction by promising his interlocutor a flight on a private jet to London and the holiday resorts of Ibiza and watching Venus and Serena Williams in the Wimbledon tennis championships.

Charlie Wilson then provides a more experienced point of view on love, advising all concerned not to be foolish, to appreciate what they have, and not to be distracted by "a pretty face". This implies that the Timberlake and Snoop characters may already be in relationships, and are considering infidelity with the women mentioned in the song.

The song's three vocalists thus show three stages of a man's romantic life: Timberlake as the young ingenue; Snoop Dogg as the Casanova in his prime; and Wilson as the experienced older man dispensing advice to his younger companions.

== Critical reception ==
David Jeffries highlighted and praised: "The up-tempo "Signs" with Justin Timberlake is glittery disco fun, but it ain't gonna keep Snoop from being himself." RapReviews described: "look for him sharing the spotlight with Snoop and Justin Timberlake on "Signs," although the D-oh-double-G still steals the show:

"It's legit, you know it's a hit When the Neptunes and the Doggy Dogg fin' to spit You know he's in - tune with the season Come here baby, tell me why you leavin? Tell me if it's weed that you need If you wanna breathe, I got the best weed minus seeds Ain't nobody trippin, V.I.P. they can't get in If somethin go wrong then you know we get to crippin"

Justin Timberlake does crip-hop? Sounds wrong, but it comes out just right."

== Chart performance ==
The single reached number two on the UK Singles Chart in May 2005 and number 46 on the US Billboard Hot 100 chart. In Australia, it stayed at number one on the Australian Singles Chart for two weeks.

== Music video ==
The music video was directed by Paul Hunter and takes place in an underground boxing gym and at a casino in Las Vegas, Nevada. It was the most played video on the UK version of The Box in 2005.

== Charts ==
=== Weekly charts ===
Chart (2005)	Peak position
Australia (ARIA)	1
Australian Urban (ARIA)	1
Austria (Ö3 Austria Top 40)	5
Belgium (Ultratop 50 Flanders)	11
Belgium (Ultratop 50 Wallonia)	20
Canada CHR/Pop Top 30 (Radio & Records)	12
Denmark (Tracklisten)	3
Europe (Eurochart Hot 100)	1
France (SNEP)	13
Germany (GfK)	3
Greece (IFPI)	8
Hungary (Rádiós Top 40)	25
Hungary (Dance Top 40)	16
Ireland (IRMA)	2
Italy (FIMI)	7
Netherlands (Dutch Top 40)	3
Netherlands (Single Top 100)	6
New Zealand (Recorded Music NZ)	4
Norway (VG-lista)	12
Scotland Singles (OCC)	2
Sweden (Sverigetopplistan)	58
Switzerland (Schweizer Hitparade)	5
UK Singles (OCC)	2
UK Airplay (Music Week)	3
UK Hip Hop/R&B (OCC)	1
US Billboard Hot 100	46
US Pop Airplay (Billboard)	17
US Rhythmic Airplay (Billboard)	24

=== Year-end charts ===
Chart (2005)	Position
Australia (ARIA)	37
Australian Urban (ARIA)	15
Belgium (Ultratop 50 Flanders)	68
Europe (Eurochart Hot 100)	41
Germany (Media Control GfK)	51
Netherlands (Dutch Top 40)	21
Netherlands (Single Top 100)	67
New Zealand (RIANZ)	24
Switzerland (Schweizer Hitparade)	29
UK Singles (OCC)	21
UK Airplay (Music Week)	10
UK Urban (Music Week)	7
US Mainstream Top 40 (Billboard)	95
Venezuela (Record Report)	49

== Certifications ==
Region	Certification	Certified units/sales
Australia (ARIA)	Gold	35,000^{^}
Denmark (IFPI Danmark)	Gold	4,000^{^}
Germany (BVMI)	Gold	150,000^{‡}
New Zealand (RMNZ)	Platinum	30,000^{‡}
United Kingdom (BPI)	Platinum	600,000^{‡}
United States (RIAA)	Gold	500,000^{*}
^{*} Sales figures based on certification alone.^{^} Shipments figures based on certification alone.^{‡} Sales+streaming figures based on certification alone.

== Release history ==
Region	Date	Format(s)	Label(s)	Ref.
Australia	April 25, 2005	CD	Doggystyle; Star Trak; Geffen	
United Kingdom	April 25, 2005	12-inch vinyl; CD	Doggystyle; Star Trak; Geffen	
