= R&G (Rhythm & Gangsta): The Masterpiece =

Studio album by Snoop Dogg
- Released: November 16, 2004
- Recorded: November 2003–September 2004
- Studios: Doggystyle Records, Diamond Bar, Los Angeles, California – Star Trak, Virginia Beach, Virginia – New York City, New York – Atlanta, Georgia
- Genre: Hip-hop
- Length: 77:41
- Labels: Doggystyle; Star Trak; Geffen
- Producers: Da Bigg Boss Dogg (exec.); The Neptunes (also exec.); Black Jeruz; Hi-Tek; J.R. Rotem; Josef Leimberg; L.T. Hutton; Lil Jon; Mr. Porter; Ole Folks; Ron Browz; Sha Money XL; Soopafly; The Alchemist; Warryn Campbell

Snoop Dogg chronology
The Hard Way (2004)	R&G (Rhythm & Gangsta): The Masterpiece (2004)	Tha Blue Carpet Treatment Mixtape (2006)

Singles from R&G (Rhythm & Gangsta): The Masterpiece
- 1. "Drop It Like It's Hot" Released: September 27, 2004; 2. "Let's Get Blown" Released: December 14, 2004; 3. "Signs" Released: February 19, 2005; 4. "Ups & Downs" Released: June 18, 2005

R&G (Rhythm & Gangsta): The Masterpiece is the seventh studio album by American rapper Snoop Dogg. It was released on November 16, 2004, by Doggystyle Records, making its first on Star Trak Entertainment and Geffen Records. Recording sessions took place from November 2003 to September 2004 in each of several recording studios. The album's production was handled from The Neptunes, The Alchemist, Lil Jon, Hi-Tek, Warryn Campbell, and L.T. Hutton, among others.

The album debuted at number six on the US Billboard 200, selling 225,000 copies in its first week. Upon its release, R&G (Rhythm & Gangsta): The Masterpiece received generally positive reviews from music critics.

== Background ==
In November 2002, Snoop Dogg released his sixth studio album Paid tha Cost to Be da Boss, which spawned two worldwide singles "From tha Chuuuch to da Palace" and two-time Grammy nominated "Beautiful", both which were produced by The Neptunes. In June 2004, it was announced that Snoop Dogg had signed with Pharrell Williams' and Chad Hugo's record label Star Trak Entertainment to produce and serve as executive producers of his then-upcoming seventh studio album.

== Singles ==
"Drop It Like It's Hot" featuring Pharrell Williams, was released as the album's lead single on September 27, 2004. The song was produced by The Neptunes. The song gained critical attention for its sparse production, essentially just tongue clicks, keyboards, and a drum machine beat, that compares it to much of the early 2000s rap that was very minimalist. It was nominated at the 2005's Grammy Awards for Best Rap Song and Best Rap Performance by a Duo or Group, though it lost both awards to the songs "Jesus Walks" by Kanye West, and "Let's Get It Started" by The Black Eyed Peas, respectively. The song reached number 10 on the UK Singles Chart, and number one on the US Billboard's Hot 100, becoming Snoop's first US number one single. The song internationally reached the top-ten in 12 countries.

The album's second single, "Let's Get Blown" featuring Pharrell, was released on December 14, 2004. The song was produced by The Neptunes. It did not repeat the success of "Drop It Like It's Hot", but it filled the gap between the aforementioned song and the club hit "Signs". Keyshia Cole, who had not garnered a reputation at that time and was therefore left uncredited (her contribution to the R&G song "Pass It Pass It" also went uncredited). The song samples and contains interpolations from Slave's "Watching You", which was also interpolated in "Gin and Juice". The single became one of Snoop Dogg's biggest hits in the United Kingdom for peaking at number 13, and charted at number 54 on the US Billboard's Hot 100.

The album's third single, "Signs" featuring Justin Timberlake and Charlie Wilson, was released on April 25, 2005. The song was produced by The Neptunes. In May 2005, the single reached at number two on the UK Singles Chart, and number 46 on the US Billboard's Hot 100. However, it was more popular in Australia staying at number one on the Australian Singles Chart for two weeks. Internationally, the song reached the top-ten in 11 countries.

The album's fourth and final single, "Ups & Downs" featuring Bee Gees, was released on August 15, 2005. The song was produced by Warryn Campbell. The song interpolates The Bee Gees' 1979 hit "Love You Inside Out". The song charted in several countries, but didn't match the success from his previous singles on the album.

== Critical reception ==
Professional ratings
Aggregate scores
Source	Rating
Metacritic	63/100
Review scores
Source	Rating
AllMusic	4/5 stars
Blender	3/5 stars
Entertainment Weekly	B−
HipHopDX	3/5
Los Angeles Times	3/4 stars
NME	7/10
Pitchfork	2.1/10
RapReviews	8/10
Rolling Stone	3/5 stars
USA Today	3.5/4 stars

R&G (Rhythm & Gangsta): The Masterpiece received generally positive reviews from music critics. At Metacritic they based on an average score of 63 on the review website which indicates "generally favorable reviews". Uncut rated the album 3 stars out of 5 and wrote that "Snoop still manages some earthy funk, assisted by a gargantuan guest list."

Tom Moon of Rolling Stone wrote that "Truth-in-advertising alert: Even at its most deliriously debauched, R&G isn't quite the worlds-coming-together rap-soul masterpiece the title promises. That said, the top-shelf producers here provide the Dogg with some of the most radio-ready backing of his career: The serpentine down-tempo single "Drop It Like It's Hot," produced by the Neptunes, links Snoop's slyly exuberant delivery to a relentless dance-floor bounce. The same basic formula prevails on "Ups and Downs," which reshnizzles the Bee Gees' "Love You Inside and Out." Trouble comes when the Dogg hits the streets: What should have been a sparky duet with 50 Cent, "Oh No," sours quickly, and a coarse anthem featuring Lil Jon and Trina, "Step Yo Game Up," starts out unimaginatively lewd and descends from there. R&G begs for a little more R and some cleverer G – or, if Snoop really wanted to be bold, no G at all".

Tom Breihan of Pitchfork wrote that "R&G; is Snoop's first album for Star Trak, the label run by fallen-off hip-hop hit makers The Neptunes, a duo who all but ruled international radio with dazzling sci-fi stomp-clap new wave beats, but who've been starving for hits ever since they switched up their style to overcooked Vegas schmaltz—all bloopy bass and shuffling drums and swooshing keyboards and unbelievably obnoxious falsetto crooning. The production duo laced five of this album's songs, but their fingerprints are everywhere else here. R&G; has a unified sound, rare in hip-hop albums, but it's a sound based on tinkly pianos and noodly guitars and windchimes. It sounds something like The Black Eyed Peas if they tried to make a Barry White album, but with more falsetto warbling."

== Commercial performance ==
R&G (Rhythm & Gangsta): The Masterpiece debuted at number six on the US Billboard 200 chart, selling 225,000 copies in its first week. In its second week, the album fell to number nine on the Billboard 200, selling 203,000 copies, for a two-week total of 428,000 units. As of March 2008, the album sales 1,724,000 copies in the United States.

== Track listing ==
No.	Title	Writer(s)	Producer(s)	Length
1.	"(Intro) I Love to Give You Light"	Calvin Broadus, Jr.; Priest Brooks; Alan Maman; Andraé Crouch	The Alchemist	2:38
2.	"Bang Out"	Broadus, Jr.; Jasmin Lopez; Jonathan Rotem	J.R. Rotem	3:05
3.	"Drop It Like It's Hot" (featuring Pharrell)	Broadus, Jr.; Pharrell Williams; Chad Hugo	The Neptunes	4:26
4.	"Can I Get a Flicc Witchu" (featuring Bootsy Collins)	Broadus, Jr.; William Collins; Josef Leimberg; David Reeves	Josef Leimberg	5:24
5.	"Ups & Downs" (featuring Bee Gees)	Broadus, Jr.; Barry Gibb; Robin Gibb; Maurice Gibb; Warryn Campbell	Baby Dubb	4:04
6.	"The Bidness"	Broadus, Jr.; Hurby Azor; Brooks; Joseph Simmons; Dana McCleese; Darryl McDaniels; Alphonso Mizell; Freddie Perren; James Brown	Soopafly	3:28
7.	"Snoop D.O. Double G"	Broadus, Jr.; Michael Clervoix; Rashad Smith	Sha Money XL; Black Jeruz	4:01
8.	"Let's Get Blown" (featuring Pharrell)	Broadus, Jr.; Steve Arrington; Williams; Hugo; Danny Webster; Mark Adams; Raye Turner; Steve Washington	The Neptunes	4:41
9.	"Step Yo Game Up" (featuring Lil Jon and Trina)	Broadus, Jr.; Jonathan Smith; Katrina Taylor; Nicola Lindo	Lil Jon	4:24
10.	"Perfect" (featuring Charlie Wilson)	Broadus, Jr.; Williams; Hugo; Raymond St. John; Sade Adu	The Neptunes	5:51
11.	"WBALLZ (Interlude)"			0:21
12.	"Fresh Pair of Panties On"	Broadus, Jr.; Jeret Griffin-Black; Terrace Martin; Marlon Williams	Ole Folks	2:31
13.	"Promise I"	Broadus, Jr.; Latonya Givens; Denaun Porter; Andrew Noland; Gregory Webster; Rotem; Walter Morrison; Leroy Bonner; Marshall Jones; Mervin Pierce; Michael Chavarria; Norman Napier; Ralph Middlebrooks	Mr. Porter	3:17
14.	"Oh No" (featuring 50 Cent)	Broadus, Jr.; Clervoix; Curtis Jackson; Rondell Turner	Ron Browz; Sha Money XL	4:03
15.	"Can U Control Yo Hoe" (featuring Soopafly)	Broadus, Jr.; Brooks; Lenton Hutton	L.T. Hutton	3:08
16.	"Signs" (featuring Justin Timberlake and Charlie Wilson)	Broadus; Wilson; Williams; Hugo; Lonnie Simmons; Rudy Taylor	The Neptunes	3:56
17.	"I'm Threw Witchu" (featuring Soopafly)	Broadus, Jr.; Brooks; Campbell	Baby Dubb	4:21
18.	"Pass It Pass It"	Broadus, Jr.; Williams; Hugo	The Neptunes	4:23
19.	"Girl Like U" (featuring Nelly)	Broadus, Jr.; Cornell Haynes, Jr.; Hutton; James Moore III; Kurtis Walker; Larry Smith; Robert Ford, Jr.; Russell Simmons	L.T. Hutton	4:36
20.	"No Thang on Me" (featuring Bootsy Collins)	Curtis Mayfield	Hi-Tek	4:41
Total length:				77:41

Sample credits

- "I Love to Give You Light" contains a sample from "I Come That You Might Have Life" performed by Andraé Crouch Singers and "The Greatest Love of All" performed by Eddie Murphy.
- "Drop It Like It's Hot" contains a sample from "White Horse" performed by Laid Back.
- "Can I Get a Flicc Witchu" contains a sample from "One for the Treble (Fresh)" performed by Davy DMX.
- "Ups & Downs" contains a sample from "Love You Inside Out" performed by Bee Gees.
- "The Bidness" contains a sample from "Think (About It)" performed by Lyn Collins, "Runnin" performed by Edwin Starr, "Richard Pryor Dialogue" performed by Richard Pryor and "Cinderfella Dana Dane" performed by Dana Dane.
- "Let's Get Blown" contains samples from "Watching You" performed by Slave.
- "Signs" contains a sample of "Early in the Morning" by The Gap Band.
- "No Thang on Me" contains a sample from "No Thing on Me (Cocaine Song)" performed by Curtis Mayfield and "All Around the World" performed by Lisa Stansfield.

== Personnel ==
Credits adapted from AllMusic.

- 50 Cent – vocals
- The Alchemist – producer
- Dave Aron – mixing
- Steve Baughman – engineer
- Bee Gees – vocals
- Black Jeruz – producer
- J.A. Black – vocals
- Mike Bozzi – assistant
- Ron Browz – keyboards, producer
- Bruce Buechner – engineer
- Sandra Campbell – project coordinator
- Warryn Campbell – instrumentation, producer, programming
- Mike Chav – engineer, guitar, mixing
- Keyshia Cole – vocals
- Bootsy Collins – vocals
- Sean Cooper – sound design
- Daz Dillinger – vocals
- DJ Pooh – vocals
- Shon Don – engineer, mixing, vocals
- Anthony Donelson – guitar
- John Fryer – mixing
- Brian Gardner—mastering engineer
- Ricky Harris – vocals
- Tasha Hayward – hair stylist
- L.T. Hutton – producer, vocals
- Lil Jon – producer, vocals
- Craig Love – guitar
- Anthony Mandler – art direction, design, photography
- Mister Cartoon – logo illustration
- Nelly – vocals
- Mike Nemirovsky – assistant
- The Neptunes – producer
- Nate Oberman – engineer, mixing
- Quazedelic – background vocals, congas, percussion
- April Roomet – stylist
- Sha Money XL – mixing, producer
- Snoop Dogg – primary artist, rhymes, lead vocals, vocal arrangement
- Soopafly – horn arrangements, producer, vocals
- Phil Tan – mixing
- Justin Timberlake – vocals
- Tone Trezure – vocals
- Trina – vocals
- Patrick Viala – mixing
- Kamasi Washington – horn selection
- Pharrell Williams – vocals
- Charlie Wilson – vocals

== Charts ==
=== Weekly charts ===
Chart (2004–2005)	Peak position
Australian Albums (ARIA)	38
Austrian Albums (Ö3 Austria)	26
Belgian Albums (Ultratop Flanders)	11
Belgian Albums (Ultratop Wallonia)	59
Canadian Albums (Billboard)	8
Canadian R&B Albums (Nielsen SoundScan)	3
Danish Albums (Hitlisten)	12
Dutch Albums (Album Top 100)	17
French Albums (SNEP)	14
German Albums (Offizielle Top 100)	14
Italian Albums (FIMI)	47
New Zealand Albums (RMNZ)	11
Norwegian Albums (VG-lista)	12
Swedish Albums (Sverigetopplistan)	47
Swiss Albums (Schweizer Hitparade)	13
UK Albums (Official Charts Company)	12
UK R&B Albums (Official Charts Company)	4
US Billboard 200	6
US Top R&B/Hip-Hop Albums (Billboard)	4
US Top Rap Albums (Billboard)	3

=== Year-end charts ===
Chart (2004)	Position
UK Albums (OCC)	187

Chart (2005)	Position
Belgian Albums (Ultratop Flanders)	47
Dutch Albums (Album Top 100)	54
French Albums (SNEP)	96
German Albums (Offizielle Top 100)	66
Swiss Albums (Schweizer Hitparade)	85
UK Albums (OCC)	78
US Billboard 200	25
US Top R&B/Hip-Hop Albums (Billboard)	16

== Certifications ==
Region	Certification	Certified units/sales
Australia (ARIA)	Gold	35,000^{^}
Canada (Music Canada)	Platinum	100,000^{^}
Denmark (IFPI Danmark)	Gold	20,000^{^}
France (SNEP)	Gold	100,000^{*}
Germany (BVMI)	Gold	100,000^{^}
Italy (FIMI)	Gold	50,000^{*}
New Zealand (RMNZ)	Platinum	15,000^{^}
Switzerland (IFPI Switzerland)	Gold	20,000^{^}
United Kingdom (BPI)	Platinum	300,000^{^}
United States (RIAA)	Platinum	1,724,000
^{*} Sales figures based on certification alone.^{^} Shipments figures based on certification alone.

== See also ==
- Boss'n Up
