= The Hard Way (213 album) =

Studio album by 213
- Released: August 17, 2004
- Recorded: 2002–2004
- Studio: DSR (Los Angeles); Battery (New York City); Larrabee Studios East (Los Angeles); Larrabee Studios North (Los Angeles); Planet (Los Angeles); The G-Spot (Los Angeles)
- Genre: West Coast hip-hop; gangsta rap; G-funk
- Length: 71:59
- Label: Doggystyle; G-Funk; Dogg Foundation; TVT
- Producer: Fredwreck; Hi-Tek; Quaze; B Sharp; Tha Chill; Kanye West; DJ Pooh; Nottz; Josef; Lil ½ Dead; Niggarochi; Terrace Martin; Marlon Williams; Michael Angelo; Tha Bizness; Missy Elliott; Jelly Roll

Snoop Dogg chronology
Paid tha Cost to Be da Boss (2002)	The Hard Way (2004)	R&G (Rhythm & Gangsta): The Masterpiece (2004)

Nate Dogg chronology
Nate Dogg (2003)	The Hard Way (2004)

Warren G chronology
The Return of the Regulator (2001)	The Hard Way (2004)	In the Mid-Nite Hour (2005)

Singles from The Hard Way
- 1. "So Fly" Released: July 26, 2004; 2. "Groupie Luv" Released: August 4, 2004

The Hard Way is the only studio album from American hip-hop trio 213, which consisted of Snoop Dogg, Warren G and Nate Dogg. It was released on August 17, 2004, on Snoop Dogg's Doggystyle Records, Warren G's G-Funk Entertainment, Nate Dogg's Dogg Foundation Records, and TVT Records.

== Reception ==
Professional ratings
Aggregate scores
Source	Rating
Metacritic	56/100
Review scores
Source	Rating
AllMusic	4/5 stars
Blender	3/5 stars
E!	B
Entertainment Weekly	C+
HipHopDX	3.5/5 stars
NME	7/10
RapReviews	5.5/10
Rolling Stone	3/4 stars
Stylus	6/10
Vibe	2.5/5 stars

The Hard Way received mixed to positive reviews from music critics. Jason Birchmeier of AllMusic especially praised Warren G for "rapping tougher and more gangsta than usual." For HipHopDX, K.B. Tindal described the album as containing "[c]risp beats, sharp hooks, and straight lyrics." Rating the album three out of four stars, Rob Sheffield of Rolling Stone called 213 an "excellent G-funk-era-revival supergroup."

Grading the album with a C-plus, Michael Endelman of Entertainment Weekly compared the group to the 2003–04 Los Angeles Lakers, because the album "boasts marquee talent but doesn’t quite deliver the championship trophy." Matt Barone of RapReviews scored the album 5.5 out of 10 points for "overly generic left coast production and uninspired verses." Scott McKeating of Stylus rated the album six points out of 10, in part due to lackluster lyrics: "Snoop and Nate seem to have a problem going longer than a few bars without dropping some lines about 'dirty ass hoes.'" Rondell Conway of Vibe rated the album with 2.5 out of five due to 213 offering what he called "obsolete subject matter" despite "nostalgically offer[ing] its signature G-funk sound."

== Commercial performance ==
The Hard Way debuted at number four on the US Billboard 200, selling 95,000 copies in its first week. The album debuted at top on the US Top R&B/Hip-Hop Albums chart.

"So Fly" was released on July 6, 2004, at first single from the album. The song reached at number 2 on US Billboard Bubbling Under Hot 100 Singles.

The official debut retail single was "Groupie Luv", which was also accompanied by a promo video. It was directed by Chris Robinson and was filmed in Snoop Dogg's own house (see also Still a G Thang). It is also the video debut for dancer Criscilla Crossland. "Groupie Luv" topped at number 26 on Billboard Hot 100 Airplay.

== Track listing ==
The Hard Way track listing
No.	Title	Writer(s)	Producer(s)	Length
1.	"Intro"	Calvin Broadus; Nathaniel Hale; Warren Griffin III; Frederick Wassar	Fredwreck	1:49
2.	"Twist Yo' Body"	Broadus; Hale; Griffin III; Tony Cottrell	Hi-Tek	3:28
3.	"Absolutely"	Broadus; Hale; Griffin III; Stan Harris	Quaze	4:00
4.	"Keep It Gangsta"	Broadus; Hale; Griffin III; Donald Fagen; Kevin Gilliam; Walter Becker	B Sharp	4:36
5.	"Run On Up"	Broadus; Hale; Griffin III; Vernon Johnson	Tha Chill	3:33
6.	"Groupie Luv"	Broadus; Hale; Griffin III; Mark Jordan; Bennie Maupin; Harvey Mason; Herbie Hancock; Paul Jackson	DJ Pooh	3:52
7.	"Lonely Girl"	Broadus; Hale; Griffin III; Dominick Lamb	Nottz	4:04
8.	"Another Summer" (featuring LaToiya Williams)	Broadus; Hale; Griffin III; Kanye West; Garry Glenn; Priest Brooks	West	4:12
9.	"213 tha Gangsta Clicc"	Broadus; Hale; Griffin III; Josef Leimberg	Leimberg	3:52
10.	"Gotta Find a Way"	Broadus; Hale; Griffin III; Donald Smith; Keith Henderson; LaFayette Evans; Wanda Hutchinson	Lil' ½ Dead; Niggarochi	3:25
11.	"Ups & Downs" (featuring Boki)	Broadus; Hale; Griffin III; A Edwards; Gilliam; Johnson	B Sharp; Tha Chill	3:53
12.	"Joysticc"	Broadus; Hale; Griffin III; James Mtume; Marlon Williams; Terrace Martin	Martin; Williams	4:48
13.	"Rick James" (Interlude)	Broadus; Hale; Griffin III; Nassar	Fredwreck	0:36
14.	"Mary Jane"	Broadus; Hale; Griffin III; Harris; Gabriel Jackson; Michael Small; Nathaniel Hall; Rick James	Quaze	3:48
15.	"MLK"	Broadus; Hale; Griffin III; Gilliam; Clarence Satchell; Frederick Tyrone Crum; Keith Harrison; Ralph Aikens; Robert Neal, Jr.; Roger Parker	B Sharp	3:44
16.	"Lil Girl"	Broadus; Hale; Griffin III; Michael Angelo Saulsberry	Michael Angelo	3:19
17.	"My Dirty Ho"	Broadus; Hale; Griffin III; Christopher Whitacre; Justin Henderson; Vincent Bell	Tha Bizness	4:12
18.	"Appreciation"	Broadus; Hale; Griffin III; Whitacre; Henderson	Tha Bizness	4:06
19.	"So Fly"	Broadus; Hale; Griffin III; Melissa Elliott; Zyah Ahmonuel	Missy Elliott	4:07

European edition bonus track
No.	Title	Writer(s)	Producer(s)	Length
20.	"Whistle While You Hustle" (featuring Daz Dillinger and Soopafly)	Broadus; Hale; Griffin III; Delmar Arnaud; Brooks; David Drew	Jelly Roll	2:35

Notes

- "Twist Yo' Body" features backing vocals performed by Dion.
- "Rick James" (Interlude) features vocals performed by Dave Chappelle.

Sample credits

- "Keep It Gangsta" contains an interpolation of "Black Cow" performed by Steely Dan.
- "Groupie Luv" contains an interpolation of "Chameleon" performed by Herbie Hancock, Paul Jackson, Harvey Mason and Bennie Maupin.
- "Another Summer" contains excerpts of "Intimate Friends" performed by Eddie Kendricks.
- "Gotta Find a Way" contains excerpts of "Rejoice" performed by the Emotions.
- "Joysticc" contains an interpolation of "Juicy Fruit" performed by James Mtume.
- "Mary Jane" contains excerpts of "It's Time" performed by the Jungle Brothers.
- "MLK" contains an interpolation of "Riding High" performed by Faze-O.
- "My Dirty Ho" contains an interpolation of "The Rain" performed by Oran "Juice" Jones. It also samples Lacrimosa (Requiem) in Requiem (Mozart).
- "So Fly" contains excerpts of the recording "So Gone" performed by Monica and excerpts of "You Are Number 1" performed by the Whispers.

== Personnel ==
Artists

- 213 – primary artist (all tracks)
- Snoop Dogg – primary artist (all tracks)
- Nate Dogg – primary artist (all tracks)
- Warren G – primary artist (all tracks)
- LaToiya Williams – featured artist (track 8)
- Boki – featured artist (track 11)
- Dion – background artist (track 2)
- Dave Chappelle – skit (track 13)

Technical personnel

- Brian "Big Bass" Gardner – mastering
- Nate Oberman – engineer (tracks 3, 5, 7, 10, 11, 14–17, 19)
- Shon Don – engineer (tracks 2, 4, 6–9, 16–18, 20), mixing (track 8, 12, 14, 20)
- Geoff Gibb – engineer (track 12)
- Dave Aron – mixing (tracks 3–5, 7, 9–11, 15–18)
- Steve Baughman – mixing (track 2)
- DJ Pooh – mixing (track 6)
- Nomad – mixing (track 19)

Record producers

- Fredwreck – production (tracks 1, 13)
- Hi-Tek – production (track 2)
- Quazedelic – production (tracks 3, 14)
- B Sharp – production (tracks 4, 11, 15)
- Tha Chill – production (track 5, 11)
- DJ Pooh – production (track 6)
- Nottz – production (track 7)
- Kanye West – production (track 8)
- Josef Leimberg – production (track 9)
- Lil ½ Dead – production (track 10)
- Niggarochi – production (track 10)
- Terrace Martin – production (track 12)
- Marlon Williams – production (track 12)
- Michael Angelo – production (track 16)
- J-Hen – production (tracks 17, 18)
- Missy Elliott – production (track 19)
- Jelly Roll – production (track 20)
- Soopafly – additional strings (track 7)

Additional personnel

- Benjamin Wheelock – design
- Anthony Mandler – photography

== Charts ==
=== Weekly charts ===
Weekly chart performance for The Hard Way
Chart (2004)	Peak position
Australian Albums (ARIA)	50
Belgian Albums (Ultratop Flanders)	57
Canadian Albums (Billboard)	3
Canadian R&B Albums (Nielsen SoundScan)	9
Dutch Albums (Album Top 100)	57
German Albums (Offizielle Top 100)	34
New Zealand Albums (RMNZ)	21
Swiss Albums (Schweizer Hitparade)	33
UK R&B Albums (OCC)	35
US Billboard 200	4
US Independent Albums (Billboard)	1
US Top R&B/Hip-Hop Albums (Billboard)	1

=== Year-end charts ===
Year-end chart performance for The Hard Way
Chart (2004)	Position
US Top R&B/Hip-Hop Albums (Billboard)	85

== Certifications ==
Certifications for The Hard Way
Region	Certification	Certified units/sales
Canada (Music Canada)	Gold	50,000^{^}
^{^} Shipments figures based on certification alone.

== See also ==
- List of Billboard number-one R&B/hip-hop albums of 2004
