= Real Soon =

Single by DPGC featuring Snoop Dogg, Kurupt, Daz Dillinger and Nate Dogg

from the album Welcome to tha Chuuch: Da Album
- Released: November 2005^{U.S.} April 03, 2006^{AUS; FR}
- Genre: Hip hop; West Coast hip hop; G-funk
- Length: 4:11; 4:24 (Music video)
- Label: Doggystyle Records; Koch Records
- Songwriters: D. Arnaud; R. Brown; C. Broadus; K. Gilliam; N. Hale
- Producers: Snoop Dogg; BattleCat

Snoop Dogg singles chronology
"Ups & Downs" (2005)	"Real Soon" (2005)	"Gangsta Zone" (2005)

Nate Dogg singles chronology
"Hush Is Coming" (2005)	"Real Soon" (2005)	"Shake That" (2006)

Tha Dogg Pound singles chronology
"Who Ride Wit Us?" (2000)	"Real Soon" (2005)	"Cali Is Active" (2006)

Music video
- "Real Soon" on YouTube

"Real Soon" is the first single release from Snoop Dogg's 2005 album compilation album Bigg Snoop Dogg Presents…Welcome to tha Chuuch: Da Album. It features the reunited Dogg Pound named DPGC with original first line-up that include Snoop and Nate Dogg. The song was recorded on the behalf of and to support the clemency for Stanley Tookie Williams.

Snoop Dogg participated alongside other celebrities such as Hollywood actor Jamie Foxx in the protest held on November 19, 2005, at San Quentin against the death sentence of former Crip leader Stanley Williams. Their hopes were to change the death penalty into a life sentence on the claim that Williams had converted in prison and published many children books speaking against entering into street gangs. Governor Arnold Schwarzenegger had agreed to meet with the death row inmate's lawyers, but was not convinced, and so the execution took place on December 13, 2005.

== Music video ==
The video was directed by Anthony Mandler and shot on November 9, and was aired on the 5th of December. It is a short, black and white video about Snoop, Daz and Kurupt visiting Tookie — played by Nate Dogg — in jail. In the correction facility scenes, Snoop and the DPGC wear black and white checked shirts as crip members do to show respect for their former leader. In the studio scenes, Snoop is seen wearing a "Save Tookie.Org" T-shirt, the site of an internet foundation dedicated to gather online signatures for a petition, which was to be addressed to the governor. The video was the 37th on the LAUNCH Music Videos Top 100 chart, debuting on December 10, and stayed for two weeks.

Snoop Dogg performed the song on The Tonight Show with Jay Leno on February 1, 2006.

== Remixes ==
- A remix version of the song features Jamie Foxx joining Nate Dogg on the vocals and sending a short message to the listeners. It is called the "save tookie" version and is 4½ minutes long (if the introduction is excluded; it is a commercial from Snoop for the album Da Chuuch).
- There's an extended remix with the speech of Snoop at San Quentin while the beat is still going. It is 6:43 minutes long.
- There's also a clean version available.
- A video remix also exists with an intro by Jamie Foxx who's encouraging the audience to stand against the execution, and comperes the song. It is 5:03 minutes long.

== Trivia ==
- The video was shot in a women's penitentiary and is also the prison in 50 Cent's "21 Questions" for his debut album Get Rich or Die Tryin' which also features Nate Dogg as a prisoner.
- Snoop visited Tookie in the jail, but he was refused when asked for another visit just prior to the protest at San Quentin.
- The aftermath of the events was another internet released single called "Real Talk", in which Snoop disses Arnold Schwarzenegger for allowing the execution (official sample).

== Charts ==
Chart performance for "Real Soon"
Chart (2005)	Peak position
Australia (ARIA)	49
US Bubbling Under R&B/Hip-Hop Singles (Billboard)	3
