= Ups & Downs =

Single by Snoop Dogg featuring the Bee Gees

from the album R&G (Rhythm & Gangsta): The Masterpiece
- Released: June 18, 2005
- Recorded: 2004
- Studio: The Tabernacle (Diamond Bar, California); Fever Recording Studios (North Hollywood, Los Angeles)
- Genre: Hip hop
- Length: 4:07; 4:43 (Music video)
- Label: Doggy Style; Star Trak; Geffen
- Songwriters: Calvin Broadus; Warryn Campbell; Barry Gibb; Maurice Gibb; Robin Gibb
- Producer: Warryn "Baby Dubb" Campbell

Snoop Dogg singles chronology
"Signs" (2005)	"Ups & Downs" (2005)	"Real Soon" (2005)

Bee Gees singles chronology
"This Is Where I Came In" (2001)	"Ups & Downs" (2005)	""If I Can't Have You" (The Disco Boys remixes)" (2007)

"Ups & Downs" is the fourth and final single from Snoop Dogg's album R&G (Rhythm & Gangsta): The Masterpiece. It is the only single from the album not produced by the Neptunes. The song samples the Bee Gees' 1979 single "Love You Inside Out".

Upon release, the single received some criticism due to re-using the sample which had been used two years earlier by Jay-Z and R. Kelly in "Honey" from their 2002 collaborative project The Best of Both Worlds.

It was performed by Snoop Dogg at the Live 8 concert in London on July 2, 2005.

== Music video ==
The music video was directed by Anthony Mandler and consists of three parts where each section ends with a fade out. The first half was shot entirely in black and white to give the feeling of a 1970s flashback.

In the intro, "Nuthin' but a "G" Thang" is played as background music. The beginning portrays a suburban modern residence, where Snoop is ensconced and spies out across the window blind when sirens and tire screech can be heard followed by the insert of "Every Dogg Has His Day". Then he settles into his armchair with Mr. Cartoon sitting next to him, who continues to tattoo a real R&G logo on Snoop's right shoulder. Mr. Cartoon is the professional tattoo artist member of the creative team, the Soul Assassins, whose production company made the video, and he designed the R&G initials himself for the album cover artwork.

The song starts, while Snoop visits his girls hanging around in the house, while the rest of his mob is lifting dumbbells and playing domino in the garden. Cameo appearances done by The Game, his Black Wall Street affiliates and the Soul Assassins. Snoop and some of his crew can be seen wearing a "Western Conference" pullover. The Western Conference is a real conference organized by Snoop and held on July 4, 2005. It was an attempt to reunite the former "West Coast" to put the westside into the mainstream by simultaneously launching a movement that helps newcomers and off-label street artists to reach the audience and get a contract.

The last part of the video is colored, rolling in slow motion. It include a smoky alley-way and the entrance of Mr. T's Bowling Club. Nate Dogg and Warren G show up and join Snoop.

== Charts ==
Chart (2005)	Peak position
Australia (ARIA)	25
Australian Urban (ARIA)	12
Belgium (Ultratop 50 Flanders)	3
Belgium (Ultratop 50 Wallonia)	14
Finland (Suomen virallinen lista)	19
Germany (GfK)	84
Ireland (IRMA)	19
Scottish Singles Sales (Official Charts)	98
UK Singles (Official Charts)	36
UK Hip Hop/R&B (Official Charts)	15
Switzerland (Schweizer Hitparade)	46
US Hot Singles Sales (Billboard)	20
US Hot R&B/Hip-Hop Songs (Billboard)	67
US R&B/Hip-Hop Airplay (Billboard)	66
