= Drop It Like It's Hot =

2004 single by Snoop Dogg featuring Pharrell

Single by Snoop Dogg featuring Pharrell

from the album R&G (Rhythm & Gangsta): The Masterpiece
- B-side: "Get 2 Know U"
- Released: September 27, 2004
- Genre: Hip-hop
- Length: 4:26
- Label: Doggystyle; Star Trak; Geffen
- Songwriters: Calvin Broadus; Pharrell Williams; Chad Hugo; John Guldberg; Tim Stahl
- Producer: The Neptunes

Snoop Dogg singles chronology
"I Wanna Thank Ya" (2004)	"Drop It Like It's Hot" (2004)	"Let's Get Blown" (2005)

Pharrell singles chronology
"Show Me Your Soul" (2003)	"Drop It Like It's Hot" (2004)	"Let's Get Blown" (2005)

Alternative cover

Music video
- "Drop It Like It's Hot on YouTube

"Drop It Like It's Hot" is a song by American rapper Snoop Dogg featuring American musician Pharrell Williams. It was released on September 27, 2004, as the lead single from Snoop Dogg's seventh studio album, R&G (Rhythm & Gangsta): The Masterpiece (2004). The song was produced by Williams alongside Chad Hugo as the Neptunes. It is regarded as an iconic song, with Snoop performing the chorus and the second and third verses while Pharrell performs the first verse.

The song topped the US Billboard Hot 100 for three weeks, making it both artists' first number one on the chart. It was also Snoop's fourth top-ten as a solo artist, first since 2003's "Beautiful" featuring Williams and Uncle Charlie Wilson (the others being 1993's "What's My Name?" and 1994's "Gin and Juice"). The song also gave him his first number one on the Hot R&B/Hip-Hop Singles & Tracks chart. Internationally, it peaked at number one in New Zealand for four consecutive weeks and reached number 10 on the UK Singles Chart.

The song was noted by critics for its minimal, extremely sparse production, consisting of tongue clicks, keyboards, a drum machine beat and white noise. It was nominated at the 47th Annual Grammy Awards in 2005 for Best Rap Song and Best Rap Performance by a Duo or Group. The single was Williams' biggest hit worldwide until 2013. On December 10, 2009, "Drop It Like It's Hot" was named the most popular rap song of the decade by Billboard. In 2024, the song appeared on Williams' soundtrack album Piece by Piece (Original Motion Picture Soundtrack).

== Origin of song title ==
The phrase "drop it like it's hot" was already in common use before Snoop Dogg and Pharrell's song of the same name was released in 2004, and had been used in various songs since the 1990s. It is a metaphorical description of a dance move commonly performed by women, and is performed by various women throughout the music video. It was used in Positive K's 1992 album The Skills Dat Pay da Bills, in the song "Ain't No Crime." Fat Pat used the phrase in his single "Ghetto Dreams" recorded in 1997 from the 1998 album of the same name. It was also used by Lil Wayne as a guest rapper on Juvenile's 1999 hit single "Back That Azz Up" from his album 400 Degreez, and in his own song called "Drop It Like It's Hot" from his 1999 debut album Tha Block is Hot featuring B.G. and Mannie Fresh. Clark Kent said "drop it like it's hot" in the song "Cashmere Thoughts" from Jay-Z's 1996 debut album, Reasonable Doubt. DJ Quik used the phrase in the song "Sexuality" from his 2000 album Balance & Options. Another song with the same name is "Drop It Like It's Hot", sung by the Big Tymers, and featuring Chilli, Juvenile, and Lac. This version of the song was featured in the Big Tymers' 1998 rerelease of their debut album, How You Luv That Vol. 2.

Outside of hip-hop, it was also the title of a song on indie rock band Minus the Bear's 2002 EP Bands Like It When You Yell "Yar!" at Them.

== Critical reception ==
USA Today called the song "scorching". Rolling Stone's Tom Moon said "The serpentine down-tempo single 'Drop It Like It's Hot', produced by the Neptunes, links Snoop's slyly exuberant delivery to a relentless dance-floor bounce". Steve "Flash" Juon of Rap Reviews wrote: "the stripped down sound of the Neptunes produced 'Drop it Like It's Hot' has produced one of Snoop's biggest hits to date. Ironically it may be in some ways more gangsterish than his "Deep Cover" debut in some aspects, but he's so chill about his delivery it doesn't sound the least bit menacing: That's quintessential Snoop for you - hard when you're not looking, but still velvet enough to appeal to the ladies and drive off in a fly Mercedes". Similarly, AllMusic's David Jeffries stated: "the ultrahot production team the Neptunes' contribution to the killer single 'Drop It Like It's Hot' had been duly noted, but lost in all the chatter was how inspired and on-fire Snoop sounds".

== Music video ==
The music video of the single was released in 2004. It was directed by Paul Hunter and shot in black-and-white. It shows Snoop Dogg doing the dance step known as the Crip Walk in the very beginning and end. The video included both of Snoop Dogg's sons, Corde and Cordell Broadus. Other appearances in the video include Terry Kennedy, Lauren London, Pharrell Williams' fellow Neptunes member Chad Hugo, and Pusha T.

The video won the award for the Best Hip Hop Video at the 2006 MTV Australia Video Music Awards and a MOBO Award for Best Video in 2005.

== Radio edits ==
There are two radio edits for the song: one is a standard radio edit that removes profanities and drug references while the other is an "Extra Clean" edit that removes phrases with gun and gang references (and the word "roll" from the chorus) as well.

== Commercial performance ==
"Drop It Like It's Hot" was the highest-ranking debut for the Billboard Hot 100 chart dated October 2, 2004, entering the chart at number 51. The song topped the US Billboard Hot 100 for three weeks from December 10, 2004. The song also reached number one on the Hot R&B/Hip-Hop Singles & Tracks, Hot Rap Tracks, and Rhythmic Top 40 charts. Since its release the song has been certified gold by the Recording Industry Association of America (RIAA). The Mastertone (ringtone) version received certification of double platinum by the RIAA.

Worldwide, The single reached number 10 on the UK Singles Chart and reached the top 10 in several other European countries countries. In New Zealand, the song topped the RIANZ Singles Chart for four weeks, making it Snoop Dogg's first number one on the chart.

== Track listing ==
- CD single
1. Drop It Like It's Hot (featuring Pharrell) — 4:32
2. Get 2 Know U (featuring Jelly Roll) — 3:36

== Charts ==
=== Weekly charts ===
Chart (2004–2005)	Peak position
Australia (ARIA)	4
Australian Urban (ARIA)	3
Austria (Ö3 Austria Top 40)	9
Belgium (Ultratop 50 Flanders)	9
Belgium (Ultratop 50 Wallonia)	12
Canada CHR/Pop Top 30 (Radio & Records)	5
Denmark (Tracklisten)	2
Europe (Eurochart Hot 100)	5
Finland (Suomen virallinen lista)	13
France (SNEP)	21
Germany (GfK)	8
Ireland (IRMA)	7
Italy (FIMI)	11
Netherlands (Dutch Top 40)	5
Netherlands (Single Top 100)	7
New Zealand (Recorded Music NZ)	1
Norway (VG-lista)	9
Romania (Romanian Top 100)	40
Scottish Singles Sales (Official Charts)	16
Sweden (Sverigetopplistan)	25
Switzerland (Schweizer Hitparade)	3
UK Singles (Official Charts)	10
UK Hip Hop/R&B (Official Charts)	2
US Billboard Hot 100	1
US Hot R&B/Hip-Hop Songs (Billboard)	1
US Hot Rap Songs (Billboard)	1
US Pop Airplay (Billboard)	5
US Rhythmic Airplay (Billboard)	1

=== Year-end charts ===
Chart (2004)	Position
UK Singles (OCC)	146
UK Urban (Music Week)	12
US Billboard Hot 100	71
US Hot R&B/Hip-Hop Singles & Tracks (Billboard)	43
US Hot Rap Tracks (Billboard)	24
US Rhythmic Top 40 (Billboard)	58

Chart (2005)	Position
Australia (ARIA)	36
Australian Urban (ARIA)	14
Austria (Ö3 Austria Top 40)	69
Belgium (Ultratop 50 Flanders)	66
Europe (Eurochart Hot 100)	31
Germany (Media Control GfK)	47
Netherlands (Dutch Top 40)	60
Netherlands (Single Top 100)	65
New Zealand (RIANZ)	22
Switzerland (Schweizer Hitparade)	16
US Billboard Hot 100	23
US Hot R&B/Hip-Hop Songs (Billboard)	5
US Mainstream Top 40 (Billboard)	42
US Rhythmic Top 40 (Billboard)	18

=== Decade-end charts ===
Chart (2000–2009)	Position
US Billboard Hot 100	48
US R&B/Hip-Hop Songs (Billboard)	13
US Rap Songs (Billboard)	1

== Certifications ==
Region	Certification	Certified units/sales
Australia (ARIA)	Gold	35,000^{^}
Austria (IFPI Austria)	Gold	15,000^{*}
Denmark (IFPI Danmark)	Gold	45,000^{‡}
Germany (BVMI)	Gold	150,000^{‡}
Italy (FIMI)	Gold	25,000^{‡}
New Zealand (RMNZ)	3× Platinum	90,000^{‡}
United Kingdom (BPI)	Platinum	600,000^{‡}
United States (RIAA)	Gold	500,000^{^}
United States (RIAA) Mastertone	2× Platinum	2,000,000^{*}
^{*} Sales figures based on certification alone.^{^} Shipments figures based on certification alone.^{‡} Sales+streaming figures based on certification alone.

== Release history ==
Region	Date	Format(s)	Label(s)	Ref.
United States	September 27, 2004	Rhythmic contemporary; urban radio	Doggystyle; Star Trak; Geffen	
United States	November 15, 2004	Contemporary hit radio	Doggystyle; Star Trak; Geffen	
Australia	January 17, 2005	CD	Doggystyle; Star Trak; Geffen	
United States	December 13, 2024	7-inch vinyl	Interscope	

== Remixes ==
- The official remix features new verses from Snoop Dogg, Pharrell Williams, and a verse from Jay-Z dissing R. Kelly for suing him, which appeared on the bonus CD of the 2005 Boss'n Up DVD.
- English drum and bass producer Roni Size performed a remix with Dynamite MC on BBC Radio 1's Live Lounge on January 10, 2005.
- Glitch-hop producer Edit also created an unofficial, unreleased remix, which can be found on various mixtapes.
- A remix of the song uses a new sample of the Gap Band song "Outstanding". The remix features E-40, Killer Mike, Warren G and Jadakiss.
- Lil Wayne released a remix of the song, titled "Nah This Ain't the Remix", on his 2005 mixtape The Dedication. He takes shots at Snoop Dogg for using his line, with lines like "don't touch my shit nigga" and "I rock a red flag.." However, he claimed that he was not mad at Snoop, saying in the song, "When I first heard this I got a little upset but then I thought to myself, what haven't I done yet?" and later, "Nah, I ain't hatin', don't get me wrong, I made it a hot line, you made it a hot song. Peace." It can be taken as a reference to Jay-Z's song dissing Nas, "Takeover", in which Jay-Z says: "I sampled your voice, you was usin' it wrong, you made it a hot line, I made it a hot song."

=== Mashups ===
- Mashup artist Party Ben mashed "Drop It Like It's Hot" with the Led Zeppelin song "Whole Lotta Love".
- DJ BC mashed up the song with Nu Shooz's I Can't Wait.
- A mashup by an unknown artist was featured in the 10th Victoria's Secret Fashion Show in 2005. It is mashed with the song "Plaine Ma Plaine" by French composer Paul Mauriat. The mashup was uploaded to the streaming platform SoundCloud in 2013 by Kurt Mamisao; however, he is not considered the artist who originally made the mashup.

=== Samples ===
- Jamie Foxx's 2009 hit "Blame It" (featuring T-Pain) from his album Intuition sampled the song with a cameo appearance by Snoop Dogg at the 2009 BET Awards.

== Parodies ==
- MADtv did a parody music video of "Drop It Like It's Hot" called "Smokin' Too Much Pot." (The real song also contains references to marijuana.)
- British comedian Lenny Henry performed an elaborate parody of the song, complete with a music video closely mimicking that of the original, on the second episode of his 2005 comedy series, The Lenny Henry Show.
- "Weird Al" Yankovic included a few lines from the song in "Polkarama!", a medley of popular songs set to polka music on his 2006 release Straight Outta Lynwood.
- Carlos Mencia parodied rappers who went to jail in a rap video parody on Mind of Mencia. He parodied Snoop's "Drop It Like It's Hot", DMX's "Ruff Ryders' Anthem" and Mystikal and Pharrell's "Shake Ya Ass".
- Bulgarian comedy rappers DJ Damian & Dinamit parodied the video of "Drop It Like It's Hot" and Terror Squad featuring Fat Joe and Remy's song "Lean Back (Remix)" (produced by Lil Jon) in their song "Kachak" ("Къчак") satirizing the lifestyle of the gypsies of Bulgaria.
- The music video was parodied by country group Hot Apple Pie for their 2005 video "Hillbillies".
- Snoop Dogg adapted the song to "Pocket Like It's Hot" in an advertising campaign for Hot Pockets.
- Iman "Alphacat" Crosson made a parody of the song which focuses on Barack Obama's presidency and his health care ObamaCare.
- Kendrick Lamar parodied the song on his first mixtape Hub City Threat: Minor Of The Year (2004).

== Covers and other media ==
- The song was covered by the German band The BossHoss on their 2007 release Stallion Battalion.
- Jimmy Fallon and Justin Timberlake covered the song in a "History of Rap" skit.
- The song was covered by German singer Lena Meyer-Landrut.

=== Soundtrack appearances ===
- The song appears in the game Dance Central for Kinect on the Xbox 360, in a commercial for the soft drink Sun Drop, the 2013 animated film Turbo and its soundtrack (using the clean radio version) and the 2019 animated film The Addams Family (In which Snoop Dogg also starred).
- The song was featured in the 2013 animated film Turbo.
- The song was featured on the NBA 2K15 soundtrack.
- The song was featured in The Wire, season 3, episode 12, "Mission Accomplished" in 2004.
- A remixed version of the song is available as downloadable content for the music video game series Rock Band. The song features the original vocal track (censored to maintain an ESRB "Teen" rating) with an added electric guitar and bass line, as well as an expanded drum pattern.
- Also, it appeared on Williams' soundtrack album Piece by Piece (Original Motion Picture Soundtrack), and also appeared on the trailer of the Williams biopic of the same name.

=== Legacy ===
- The hand motioned dance featured near the beginning of the music video became an internet meme and has been used in numerous internet videos from well-known online creators.
- The song was performed on August 11, 2024, in the 2024 Summer Olympics closing ceremony during the handover segment from Paris to Los Angeles, it was recorded one day before the ceremony in Long Beach, California.

== See also ==
- List of number-one singles from the 2000s (New Zealand)#2005
- List of Hot 100 number-one singles of 2004 (U.S.)
- List of number-one R&B singles of 2004 (U.S.)
- List of Billboard number-one rap singles of the 2000s
- List of Billboard Rhythmic Top 40 number-one songs of the 2000s
