= Nate Dogg =

American singer and rapper (1969–2011)

- Nate Dogg in 1997
- Born: Nathaniel Dwayne Hale; August 19, 1969; Long Beach, California, U.S.
- Died: March 15, 2011 (aged 41); Long Beach, California, U.S.
- Burial place: Forest Lawn Memorial Park, Long Beach, California, U.S.
- Education: Long Beach Polytechnic High School
- Occupations: Singer; rapper; songwriter
- Years active: 1992–2011
- Works: Nate Dogg discography
- Spouse: LaToya Calvin (m. 2008)
- Children: 9
- Relatives: Butch Cassidy (cousin); Snoop Dogg (cousin); Lil ½ Dead (cousin)
- Musical career
- Genres: R&B; West Coast hip-hop; G-funk
- Labels: Death Row; Interscope; Breakaway; Dogg Foundation; Elektra; Love & Happiness; Nate Dogg, Inc.
- Formerly of: 213; D.P.G.C.

Nathaniel Dwayne Hale (August 19, 1969 – March 15, 2011), known professionally as Nate Dogg, was an American singer, rapper, and songwriter. He gained recognition for providing soulful choruses and other guest vocals on several hip-hop songs between 1992 and 2007, earning him the honorific title "King of Hooks".

Hale began his career in 1990 as a member of 213, a hip-hop trio formed with his cousin Snoop Dogg and mutual friend Warren G. In the 2000s, he began working with other mainstream rappers including Eminem, 50 Cent, Fabolous, Mos Def, and Ludacris. Hale performed on 18 Billboard Hot 100 entries, 16 as a featured artist and 2 as a primary artist. These included "21 Questions" (2003) by 50 Cent, which peaked atop the chart, "Regulate" (1994) by Warren G, which peaked at number 2, and "Shake That" (2006) by Eminem, which peaked at number 6. "Regulate" was nominated for Best Rap Performance by a Duo or Group at the 37th Annual Grammy Awards.

Hale released three studio albums, as well as several singles as a solo artist. Hale suffered extensively from alcoholism. On March 15, 2011, after suffering two strokes, Hale died at the age of 41 of congestive heart failure.

== Early life ==
Nathaniel Dwayne Hale was born on August 19, 1969, in Clarksdale, Mississippi. (Note: Some sources say he was born in Clarksdale, Mississippi.) He had three brothers: Samuel Hale, Emmanuel (Manuel) Hale, and Daniel Hale Jr., and two sisters: Pamela Hale-Burns and LaTonia Hale-Watkins. His cousins include rappers Butch Cassidy and Snoop Dogg.

His first performance was at the age of 4 at Life Line Baptist Church in Clarksdale, where his father was a pastor and his mother led the choir.

At age 14, after the divorce of his parents, Hale moved to Long Beach with his mother. Hale attended Long Beach Polytechnic High School. He sang in the choir at the New Hope Baptist Church in Long Beach.

At age 17, Hale dropped out of high school, left home, and enlisted in the United States Marine Corps. He was stationed at Camp Schwab in Okinawa Prefecture, Japan, in the Matériel Readiness Battalion of the 3rd Force Service Support Group, which supplied ammunition to most of the Pacific Ocean. After three years as an ammunition specialist, he received a military discharge in 1989 and returned to Long Beach.

== Musical career ==
=== 213 ===
In 1990, Nate Dogg, and friends Snoop Dogg and Warren G formed a rap trio called 213. They recorded their first demo tape in the back of VIP Records in Long Beach. The demo was heard by Dr. Dre, the stepbrother of Warren G, who then invited the group to his studio.

=== Solo career ===
Hale debuted on Dr. Dre's first solo album, The Chronic (1992) and his singing, complementing the new gangsta rap sound G-funk, was well received by critics. He signed to Dr. Dre's label, Death Row Records, in 1993. Nate Dogg was also featured on Snoop Dogg's debut solo album, Doggystyle, in 1993, his singing was prominent on the track "Ain't No Fun (If the Homies Can't Have None)".

In 1994, Hale co-wrote and sang on "Regulate" with Warren G.

That year, Hale was featured on "How Long Will They Mourn Me?" on Thug Life, Volume I from Thug Life.

In July 1998, amid his departure from Death Row Records, the label released his double album, G-Funk Classics, Vol. 1 & 2. It included the singles "Nobody Does It Better", which peaked at number 18 the Billboard Hot 100 chart in August 1998 and "Never Leave Me Alone", which had peaked at number 33 in November 1996.

In September 2001, Hale signed with Elektra Records. His second album, Music & Me, peaked at number 3 on the Billboard Top R&B/Hip-Hop Albums chart.

Hale had an eponymous album slated for release in 2003. It was shelved by Elektra Records and released as a bootleg recording.

Hale was sought to sing the hook on other artists' tracks. His notable collaborations, 16 of which charted on Billboard Hot 100, include "All Bout U" (1996) by Tupac Shakur, "The Next Episode" (2000) by Dr. Dre, "Gangsta Nation" (2003) by Westside Connection, "Oh No" (2000) by Mos Def, "Can't Deny It" (2001) by Fabolous, "Lay Low" (2001) by Snoop Dogg, "Area Codes" (2001) by Ludacris, "Ooh Wee" (2003) by Mark Ronson, "The Streets" (2002) by WC, "I Like That" (2004) by Houston, "'Till I Collapse" (2002) and "Shake That" (2006) by Eminem, and "Have a Party" (2006) by Mobb Deep.

In 2002, Hale was on a celebrity episode of Weakest Link, where, eliminated by Xzibit and Young MC, he was among the final three.

In 2007, Hale founded Innate Praise, a gospel music choir. Jacob Lusk successfully auditioned for and joined the choir.

In November 2012, a posthumous studio album entitled Nate Dogg: It's a Wonderful Life from Seven Arts Music and United Media & Music Group was speculated; however, the album was never released.

In 2015, Warren G released Regulate... G Funk Era, Part II, which features previously unreleased audio and verses from Hale on every track.

In June 2024, Flex (UK) released "6 in the Morning", which sampled Hale's vocals. It charted in the UK.

== Artistry ==
Hale was known for his deep, melodic vocals, with his music often described as a mix between R&B and rapping, and his vocal range between tenor and baritone.

Hale said he was influenced by the gospel music he performed in the church choir as a child, as well as the soul music he listened to as a child. He cited Marvin Gaye, Stevie Wonder, and Maurice White of Earth, Wind & Fire as some of his biggest musical influences.

Hale is considered to be the inventor of "gangsta singing", a singing style that blends R&B and soul vocals with gangsta rap lyrics. The style was heavily influential to urban culture and used by R. Kelly and Chris Brown.

== Legal issues ==
Hale was charged for a 1991 robbery of a Check Changers check cashing facility and for a 1994 robbery of a Taco Bell in San Pedro, but was acquitted in 1996.

In 1996, he was convicted of a drug offense in Los Angeles County and was thereafter barred from owning a firearm.

In June 2000, Hale was charged with kidnapping, domestic violence, terrorist threats, and arson for allegedly assaulting his former girlfriend and setting her mother's car on fire in Lakewood. That day, Dr. Dre posted a $1 million bond so that Hale could perform at the Up in Smoke Tour.

The charges were dismissed in March 2001; however, in August 2001, he pleaded no contest to illegal gun possession by a felon and received a $1,000 fine and three years' probation.

In April 2002, outside of Kingman, Arizona, a tour bus carrying Hale was found with two pistols and four ounces of cannabis. He was booked and then released on a $3,500 bond. The next month, the weapon charges were dropped for his guilty plea on a drug charge, and he was sentenced to probation, community service, and drug counseling.

In July 2006, Hale was charged with misdemeanor aggravated trespassing, telephone harassment, battery assault, dissuading a witness from reporting a crime, and breaking a restraining order after allegedly breaking into the house of his ex-girlfriend and punching her new boyfriend. On March 20, 2008, he pleaded guilty to trespassing and battery and lost gun-ownership rights for ten years, received three years' probation, and was ordered to a domestic violence intervention program.

In June 2008, after allegedly threatening his estranged wife by emails and chasing her on Interstate 405, Hale was charged with two felony counts of criminal threats and one count of stalking; he pleaded not guilty. In April 2009, after the alleged victim failed to contact prosecutors, the charges were dropped.

== Health problems and death ==
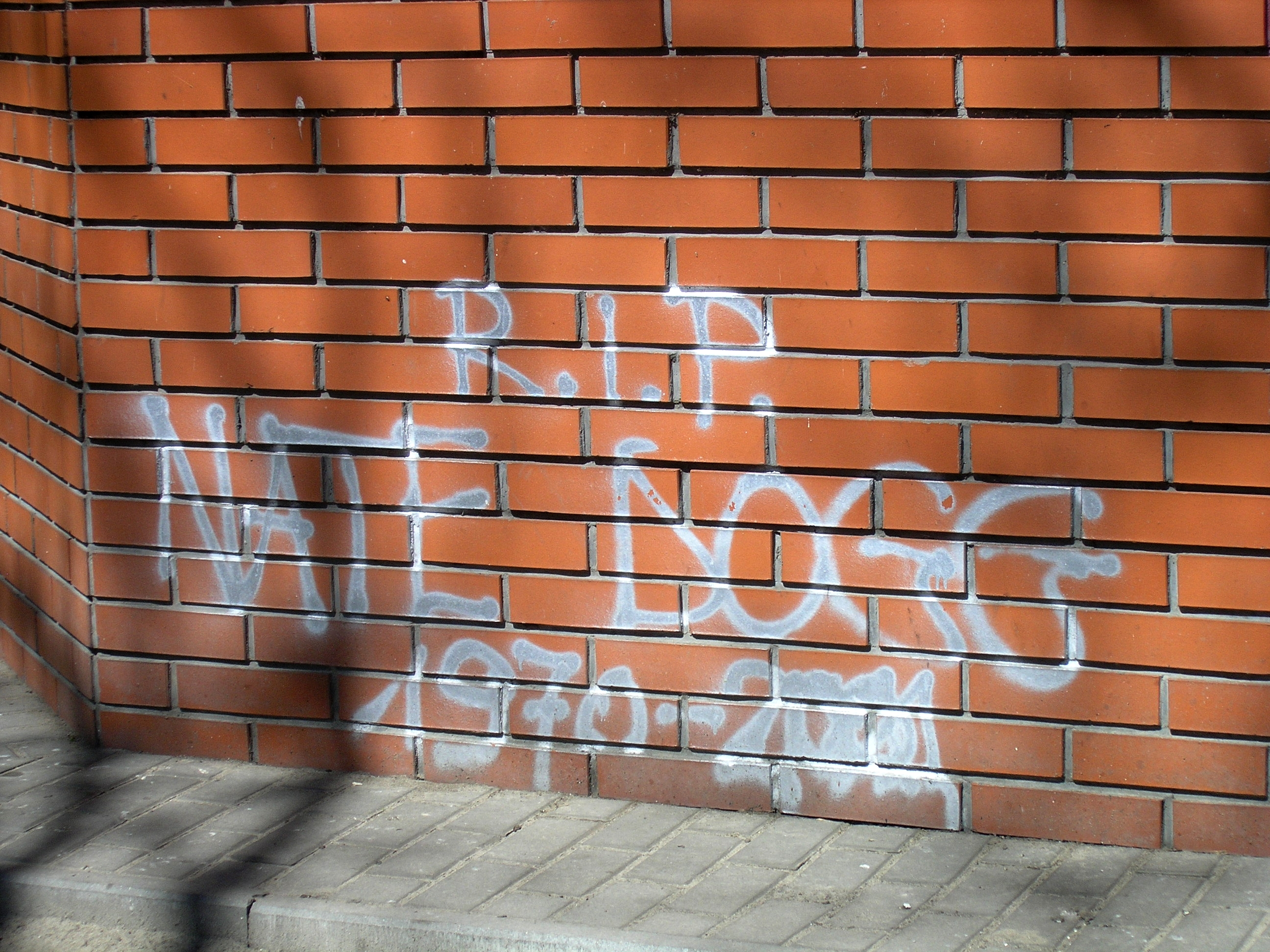
Graffiti on Solidarności Avenue in Warsaw, Poland, 2012

Hale suffered extensively from alcoholism to the point where he usually needed a bottle of Hennessy by his side, even when hospitalized. He also extensively smoked cannabis.

In 2007, Hale was involved in a traffic collision that may have exacerbated his health issues.

On December 19, 2007, Hale was admitted to Pomona Valley Hospital after suffering a stroke. He was released from the hospital a week later, on December 26, to enter a physical medicine and rehabilitation facility. He suffered from hemiparesis; the stroke weakened the left side of his body. However, neither his cognition nor his voice were affected.

Ten months later, on September 5, 2008, Hale suffered a second, more serious stroke leading to his re-hospitalization. The second stroke left Hale paralyzed and unable to speak, breathing through a tracheotomy tube. By January 2010, he had regained some limited mobility, such as the ability to lift his head.

On March 15, 2011, two years and four months after his second stroke, Hale died in Long Beach at the age of 41 due to complications of the two strokes, including congestive heart failure. He was interred in Long Beach at Forest Lawn Memorial Park after a ceremony attended by 1,100 people. In 2020, he received a new headstone.

== Personal life ==
Hale had 9 children and died without a will and testament. After his death his children fought over his estate with his grandmother, Ruth Holmes, and Hale's wife, Latoya Calvin, to whom Hale was married for only 19 days in 2008 before a divorce was filed but never finalized. However, since Calvin was legally married to Hale at the time of his death, she was entitled to a portion of his estate.

His estate was estimated to be worth $2.7 million; his music catalog worth $4 million. After Hale died, his home in Pomona, California, went into foreclosure; he had not made payments since December 2010. He owed $144,000 in taxes at the time of his death.

In 2013, Naijiel Hale, one of Nate Dogg's sons, was committed to play football at the University of Washington. Naijiel creates music under the stage name NHale and released his debut album, Young OG, in 2020. He was shot in the forearm while getting a haircut the day before his high school graduation and began smoking cannabis to deal with the pain and trauma, leading to failed drug tests that led to his dismissal from the team. He was later arrested for felony distribution of dangerous drugs.

Nathaniel Jr., another one of Nate Dogg's sons, released an album under the stage name Lil Nate Dogg.

== Discography ==
Studio albums

- G-Funk Classics, Vol. 1 (1997)
- G-Funk Classics, Vol. 1 & 2 (1998)
- Music & Me (2001)

Collaborative albums

- The Hard Way (with 213) (2004)

Unreleased albums

- Nate Dogg (2003)

== Filmography ==
- One on One (2002)
- Doggy Fizzle Televizzle (2002–2003)
- Head of State (2003)
- The Boondocks (2008)

== Awards and nominations ==
Nate Dogg was nominated for four Grammy Awards.

| Category | Song | Year | Result |
|---|---|---|---|
| Best Rap/Sung Collaboration (with Eminem) | "Shake That" | 2007 | Nominated |
| Best Rap/Sung Collaboration (with Ludacris) | "Area Codes" | 2002 | Nominated |
| Best Rap Performance by a Duo or Group (uncredited with Dr. Dre and Snoop Dogg) | "The Next Episode" | 2001 | Nominated |
| Best Rap Performance by a Duo or Group (with Warren G) | "Regulate" | 1995 | Nominated |
