= George Komsky =

Ukrainian-born American tenor

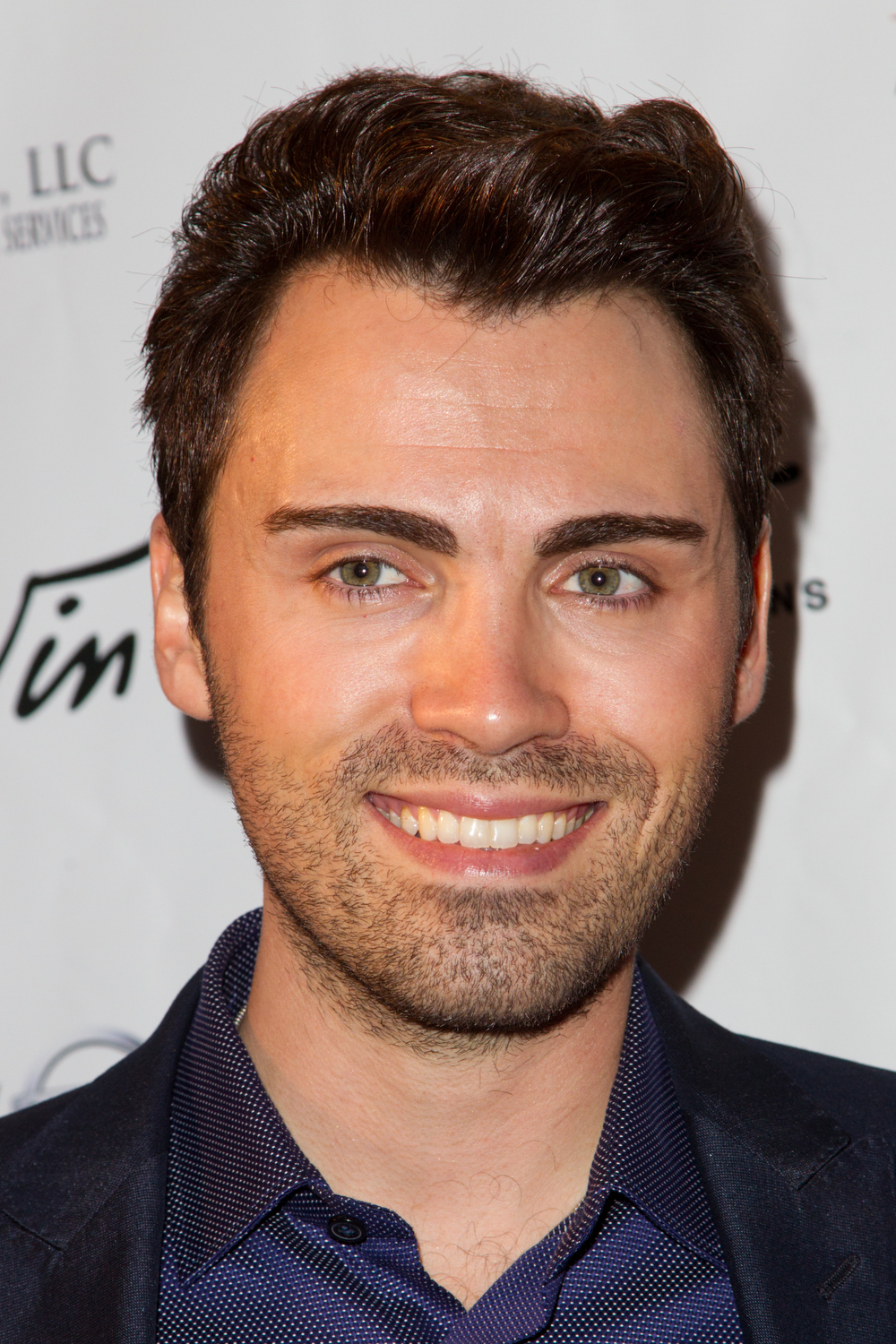
- Komsky at the Denim & Diamonds for Autism Event, November 2012

Background information
- Born: September 9, 1985 (age 40); Kiev, Ukrainian SSR, Soviet Union
- Genres: Opera; operatic pop; classical crossover
- Occupations: Opera singer (tenor); songwriter
- Instruments: Vocals; piano

George Komsky (born September 9, 1985) is a Ukrainian-born American tenor. He is best known for his live performances as a solo vocalist, touring internationally with Chris Botti, in the North American tour of the Irish theatrical show Riverdance, and at non-profit concert events.

Komsky's performance of "The Star-Spangled Banner" at the San Francisco 49ers NFL game against the New England Patriots was part of a tribute honoring the victims of the Sandy Hook Elementary School mass shooting, broadcast live to 18 million viewers.

Komsky was awarded the Best Operatic Pop Artist Award by Russian American Media in 2014. The award was presented by Rob Tannenbaum, executive director of the Sacramento Philharmonic Orchestra.

Komsky appeared on the first season of America's Got Talent under the name "George Kelly".

== Early life ==
Komsky was born in Kiev in 1985. His family fled the Soviet Union in 1988 and settled in the Bay Area, Northern California. Komsky showed an interest in music at an early age, learning piano and saxophone at age eight. He took formal singing classes during his teenage years.

Komsky lived in Danville, California, and went to Monte Vista High School where he joined the chamber choir. In 2001, as part of the school's choir, Komsky performed Verdi's Messa da Requiem at the Basilica of Saint Paul in Rome. He won a scholarship to UCLA, graduating with a degree in political science.

He trained with Seth Riggs, vocal coach of artists including Barbra Streisand, Natalie Cole and Michael Jackson.

== Career ==
=== Riverdance ===
In 2004, Komsky toured as lead soloist with the North American touring company of the Irish theatrical show Riverdance.

=== America's Got Talent ===
Komsky was a contestant in the first season of America's Got Talent, under the name "George Kelly". He reached the semi-finals, described by Judge Piers Morgan as "the best male vocalist in the show".

=== Performances of the national anthem ===
Komsky performed "The Star-Spangled Banner", national anthem of the United States, at the NFL game between the San Francisco 49ers and the New England Patriots on December 26, 2012. The performance was part of a memorial honoring the victims of the Sandy Hook Elementary School shooting that had occurred two days before. The memorial was broadcast live to approximately 18 million viewers.

Komsky has performed the United States national anthem on several sporting events afterwards, including the MLB game between the San Francisco Giants and the Los Angeles Dodgers on July 5, 2013.

=== Touring with Chris Botti ===
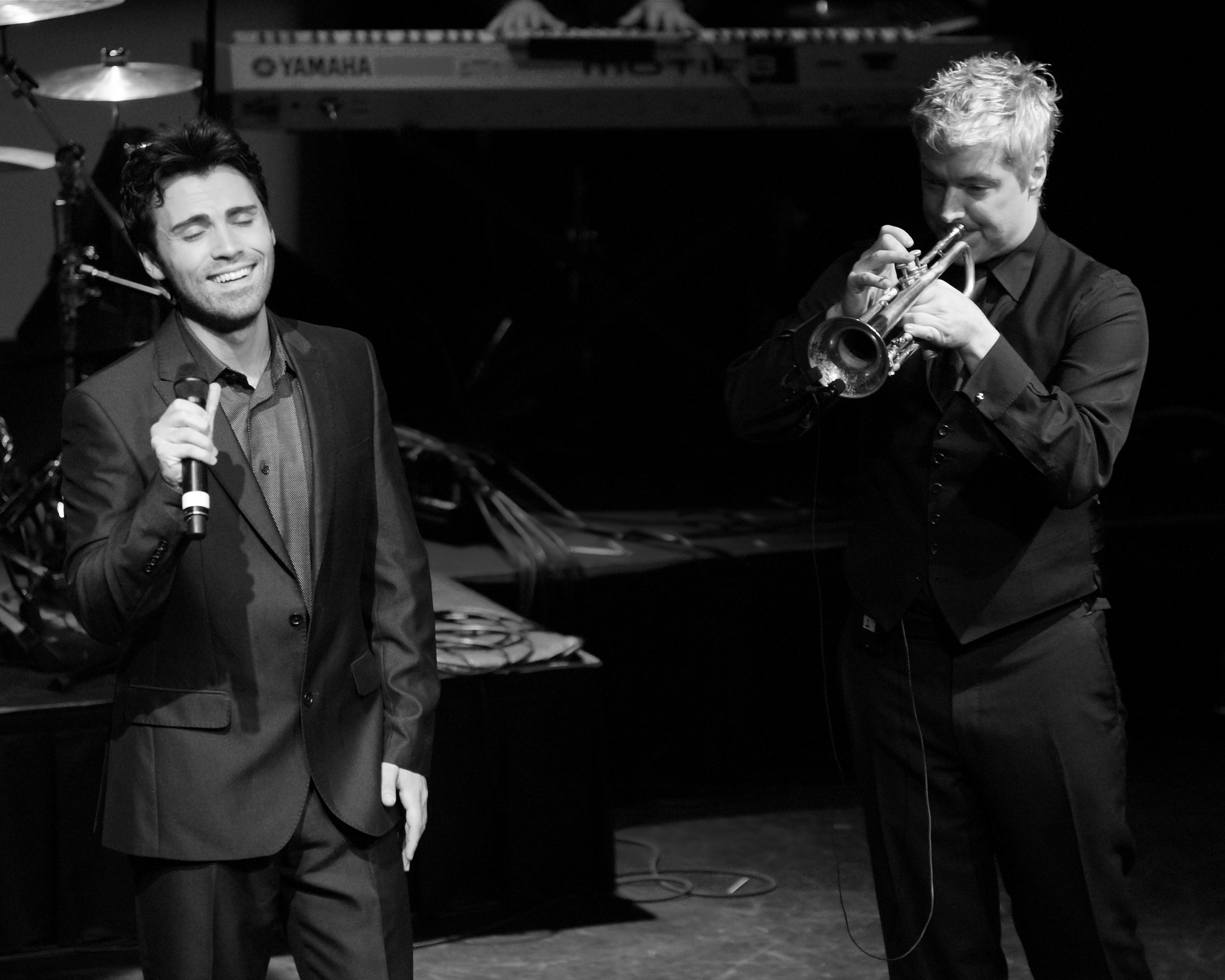
Komsky performing with Chris Botti in Napa, California 2013

In September 2013, Komsky joined trumpeter Chris Botti's Central Asian tour as a solo vocalist. He performed songs including "Time To Say Goodbye" and Botti's "Italia". Komsky continued touring with Botti over three years in venues including Carnegie Hall, the Hollywood Bowl, the Kennedy Center, the Blue Note Jazz Club, Billboard Live Osaka, the Orchestra Hall Minneapolis and the Uptown Theatre in Napa.

=== Performances ===
Komsky's first live solo appearance took place at the Lesher Center for the Arts in Walnut Creek on March 19, 2010. He performed pieces including "The Barber of Seville", "The Elixir of Love" and "Tosca". The proceeds were donated to the Wheelchair Foundation.

In November 2010, Komsky performed at the "Police and Fire: The Fallen Heroes" benefit concert at the Herbst Theatre in San Francisco.

In October 2013, he performed at the fundraising gala concert "Come On, Support New York, New York", dedicated to the victims of Hurricane Sandy.

Other live performances include the 3rd Face Forward Gala Festa Coloniale Italiana in San Francisco and the Bear Valley Music Festival.

=== Songwriting ===
March 20, 2020, China's first male bel canto quartet, Super Vocal, performed "Qui con me (Ni De Se Cai)" ("Your Colors") on the Hunan Satellite TV singing competition Singer 2020, in both Italian and Chinese lyrics. The performance received more than 40 million views in 24 hours. The studio version single of "Ni De Se Cai" was released on March 27, 2020, by Decca China. "Ni De Se Cai" was composed by George Komsky, Roxanne Seeman, and Ivo Moring with Italian lyrics "Qui con me" written by Saverio Principini, and Chinese lyrics "Ni De Se Cai" written by Cheng He. The song was produced by Nick Patrick and Wu Qinglong.
