= Qui con me (Super Vocal song) =

2020 song by Super Vocal

"Qui con me (Ni De Se Cai 你的色彩)"

Song by Super Vocal
- Language: Mandarin; Italian
- Released: March 20, 2020
- Genre: Bel canto; classical crossover; operatic pop
- Length: 4:56
- Label: Hunan TV
- Composers: Roxanne Seeman; George Komsky; Ivo Moring
- Lyricists: Saverio Principini (Italian lyrics); Cheng He (Chinese lyrics)
- Producer: Hunan TV

Music video
- "Qui con me" ("你的色彩") ) on YouTube

"Ni De Se Cai 你的色彩"

Song by Super Vocal
- Language: Mandarin
- Released: March 27, 2020
- Genre: Bel canto; classical crossover; operatic pop
- Length: 4:00
- Label: Go East Music Entertainment; Decca; Universal Music
- Composers: Roxanne Seeman; George Komsky; Ivo Moring
- Lyricist: Cheng He
- Producers: Nick Patrick; Wu Qinglong

"Qui con me"

Single by George Komsky

from the album Qui con me
- Language: Italian
- B-side: "Vivo per lei"
- Released: July 2, 2021
- Genre: Bel canto; classical crossover; operatic pop
- Length: 3:47
- Label: Roba Music Verlag GmbH
- Songwriters: Roxanne Seeman; George Komsky; Ivo Moring
- Lyricist: Saverio Principini

Music video
- "Qui con me" on YouTube

"Qui con me" (Italian for "Here with Me"), known in its Chinese version as "Ni De Se Cai" (Chinese: 你的色彩; pinyin: Nǐ de sècǎi, transl. "Your Colors"), is a song by the Chinese bel canto group Super Vocal, originally written in English by Roxanne Seeman, George Komsky and Ivo Moring. The Italian lyrics were written by Saverio Principini with the Chinese lyrics were written by Cheng He (程何).

== Background ==
The original version of the song, "My Heart", was written by George Komsky, Ivo Moring and Roxanne Seeman. Italian lyrics were written later by Saverio Principini, and Chinese ones by Cheng He.

In March 2020, during the global pandemic, Singer 2020 introduced Super Vocal, as Surprise Challengers. Super Vocal chose to perform the song with Italian lyrics, to express their blessings to Italy. It was premiered on the Singer 2020 "The Year of the Fight" stage as a Chinese–Italian bilingual live performance. Super Vocal received the ranking of Surprise Success. The Weibo topic "Super Vocal Ni De Se Cai" (#声入人心男团你的彩色#) exceeded 40 million page views in 24 hours.

== Music production ==
Universal Music invited British producers to complete the recording through the cloud production model. The song was arranged by Goh Kheng Long and produced by British producer Nick Patrick.

== Personnel ==
Credits are adapted from Tidal.

- Goh Kheng Long – producer, recording arranger
- Ruth Ling – producer, vocal producer
- George Komsky – composer/lyricist
- Ivo Moring – composer/lyricist
- Roxanne Seeman – composer/lyricist
- Saverio Principini – Italian lyrics
- Cheng He – Chinese lyrics
- Cai Cheng Yu – singer
- Gao Tian He – singer
- Ju Hong Chuan – singer
- Tong Zhuo – singer
- Liu Yutong – vocal producer
- Zeng Rong – vocal producer
- Jim Lim – vocal arranger
- Simon Lee – English horn
- Pablo Calzado – percussion

== Critical reception ==
Hu Guangxin, All Media Reporter, Yangcheng Evening News described "beautiful, poetic and graphic text. The melody of the song is warm and healing without losing its momentum."

Lin Mengyun of Hourly News, Quianjiang Evening News praised the song and performance writing "Cai Chengyu, Tong Zhuo, Gao Tianhe, and Ju Hongchuan use their highly infectious voices and tacit cooperation with each other. They use their beautiful voices and popular singing methods to let the audience feel the charm of the music while also painting the bright colors of springtime when everything comes to life."

== George Komsky version ==
Ukrainian-born American tenor George Komsky, a composer of "Qui con me", released his version as a single on July 2, 2021. It is the title track of a two-song EP with "Vivo per lei" appearing as the second track.
