= Huang Xiaoyun =

Chinese singer and actress

- 黄霄雲
- Born: 22 December 1998 (age 27); Longping Town, Luodian County, Qiannan Buyei and Miao Autonomous Prefecture, Guizhou, China
- Other name: Ghost Huang
- Education: Central Conservatory of Music
- Occupations: Singer; actress; multi-instrumentalist
- Musical career
- Genres: Chinese pop; Classical
- Instruments: Vocals; piano; guzheng; tanggu
- Years active: 2015–present
- Label: Meng Xiang Qiang Yin
- Website: Huang Xiaoyun on Weibo (in Chinese)

Chinese name
- Simplified Chinese: 黄霄云 (Note: In Simplified Chinese, Huang's name should be rendered as 黄霄云 (with 云 meaning "cloud"), however, she is known professionally by the Traditional Chinese character 雲 instead, even in Simplified characters.)
- Traditional Chinese: 黃霄雲
Transcriptions
Standard Mandarin
- Hanyu Pinyin: Huáng Xiāoyún

Huang Xiaoyun (Chinese: 黄霄雲; born 22 December 1998), also known as Ghost Huang, is a Chinese singer and actress of Bouyei ethnicity. She first gained recognition in the Chinese television talent show The Voice of China 4 in 2015 and later on in 2020, when she was a competitor on Hunan TV's Singer 2020.

She is known for her vocals and wide vocal range, as well as her viral performance of "Upwards to the Moon" (左手指月) on Sound of My Dream. The performance gained over 10 million views on YouTube.

== Early life ==
Huang was born on 22 December 1998 in Longping Town, Luodian County, Qiannan Buyei and Miao Autonomous Prefecture, Guizhou, China. Her parents discovered that she was able to accurately hum the tune of music being played when she was 6 months old and her father taught her how to play the drums when she was 2. Soon afterwards, she participated as a drummer in a band organised by her parents, known as "Le Wanjia". After that, she studied how to play the piano and guzheng. In the following years, she participated in local singing competitions every year and achieved positive results. When she was in the third year of middle school, she went to Guiyang every weekend to learn bel canto, to pass the entrance exam for the high school affiliated to the Central Conservatory of Music. In September she was admitted with satisfactory results and continued to study bel canto.

== Career ==
=== 2015: The Voice of China ===
In 2015, Huang participated in the fourth season of The Voice of China and sang Jam Hsiao's song "You" (你) in the "blind audition" stage, during which both Yu Chengqing and Wang Feng turned around, and she finally decided to join the latter's team. Later on, she sang Sun Nan's "I Believe" and Yao Beina's "Fish" (鱼) in the "mentor assessment" stage, becoming one of the top 4 students of Wang Feng's team and also top 16 overall, but her performance caused some controversy. In the Cross Battle round, she sang Eric Carmen's "All by Myself", but ended up losing the Cross Battle and was eliminated.

=== 2017–2019: First singles released and Sound of My Dream ===
On 14 December 2017, Huang released her first single, "Campaign" (征战), in which she tried adding the element of rapping for the first time. On 31 December, she released her second single, "Can We Still Love" (还可以爱吗). On 7 May 2018, she released her first self-composed single "Open" (打开).

In December, Huang participated in Zhejiang TV's music show Sound of My Dream (season 3), and her first performance of "Upwards to the Moon" 左手指月 went viral. Other songs she performed in the show include "The Light At That Time" (那时的光), "Unparalleled in the World" (天下无双), "The Story of Time" (光阴的故事) and "Same Moonlight" (一样的月光).

=== 2020-present: Singer 2020, other variety shows and first solo album ===
In January 2020, Huang represented the Central Conservatory of Music in the Zhejiang TV music program 新声请指教.

In February, Huang participated as a "Surprise Challenger" in the Hunan TV music program Singer 2020, entitled Year of the Hits (歌手·当打之年). In the first round, she challenged Mao Buyi and successfully proceeded to the next round. However, a number of Chinese netizens accused her of being discourteous and having low EQ, as Mao had only started to sing the first few lyrics before she requested to challenge him. Since then, some netizens also discovered that the song she sang in the episode, "Life of Planet" by Mayday, was not on any music platform because Mango TV did not buy the copyright. After the third round of the competition, Huang was at the bottom of the overall rankings and was eventually eliminated. She returned for the breakout round of the show and chose to challenge Jike Junyi, but her challenge failed and she did not proceed to the finals. On 11 April, she also participated as a guest singer in Zhejiang TV's music program, The Treasured Voice.

In May, Huang, Zheng Shuang, Xiong Ziqi, and Liu Wei together formed the "President of the Star Trading Company" team in the Youku e-commerce variety show "Arrival of the Best-seller! 2" (爆款来了2). She was also the contributing artist to the show's theme song.

On 16 November, Huang's first solo music album, Huang Xiaoyun's Neverland, was released.

== Artistry ==
=== Voice and timbre ===
Huang is a soprano.

== Discography ==
=== Singles ===
Title	Year	Notes
征战	2017	First single
还可以爱吗	2017	
打开	2018	First self-composed single
可能	2018	Theme song of TV drama 七日生
消散	2019	
假装	2019	Theme song of TV drama 遇见幸福
Sad Sometimes	2019	English song Song project from 音你成名; Collaboration with Corsak and Alan Walker
更漏子	2019	
没了我你依然拥有太阳	2019	Demo
和从前的自己相遇	2020	Song project from 新聲請指教; Collaboration with Tang Hanxiao
旁若无人	2020	
爆款来了	2020	Theme song of variety show 爆款来了 2
星辰大海	2021	
梦返	2021	
要不然我们就这样一万年	2023	Closing song of TV Drama 长月烬明
定玄	2026	Theme song for Xuanfang in Wuthering Waves

=== Albums ===
#	Album Information	Track listing
1st	黄霄雲的Neverland: Released: November 16, 2020; Debut Album; Label: 梦响强音	Track listing: 1. Neverland; 2. 秘密日记; 3. 一千零一夜; 4. 众声喧哗; 5. 逆世界; 6. 二十一

== Filmography ==
=== Television series ===
Year	English title	Original title	Role	Network	Notes
2016	You Music Me	薛定谔的猫	Ai Xiaoxin	Tencent Video	Acting debut
2017	Young & Cool	少年有点酷	Ai Xiaoxin	Tencent Video	Recurring role

=== Variety Shows ===
Year	English title	Original title	Role	Network	Notes
2015	The Voice of China (season 4)	中国好声音 (第四季)	Contestant	Zhejiang TV	
2018–2019	Sound of My Dream (season 3)	梦想的声音 (第三季)	Contestant	Zhejiang TV	
2020	—N/a	新声请指教	Contestant	Zhejiang TV	
2020	Singer 2020	歌手·当打之年	Contestant	Hunan TV	
2020	The Treasured Voice	天赐的声音	Guest	Zhejiang TV	
2020	Arrival of the Best-seller	爆款来了2	Cast member	Youku	
2020	Masked Singer Season 5	蒙面唱将猜猜猜S5	Guest	Youku	
2022	Singing with Legends (season 4)	我们的歌(第四季)	Contestant	Shanghai Dragon TV	
