= Singer season 8 =

Singer
- Season 8
- Hosted by: Jam Hsiao (main show, episode 1–2); Eliza Liang (main show, episode 3–10, Breakouts); He Jiong (Finals)
- Judges: 500 spectators
- Winner: Hua Chenyu
- Runner-up: Tia Ray
- Finals venue: Hunan Broadcasting System

Release
- Original network: Hunan Television
- Original release: February 7 – April 24, 2020

Season chronology
- ← Previous; Season 7 Next → Season 9

The eighth season of Chinese television series Singer (Chinese: 歌手; previously titled I Am a Singer) was broadcast on Hunan Television between February and April 2020. Singer 2020 was produced by Hong Tao, and its music director was Hong Kong senior musician Kubert Leung. The season premiere was first taped on January 3, 2020, and it was announced that the season will be subtitled Year of the Hits (Chinese: 歌手:當打之年; pinyin: Gēshǒu: Dāngdǎ zhī Nián), and this was the second season to feature returning contestants, after season five. For the first time in this series, return performances were absent for the entire season. The season premiered on February 7, 2020, and ended on April 24, 2020.

Hua Chenyu, a Chinese singer who previously competed in season six, was named the winner, making him the first previous season returnee to win I Am a Singer, while Tia Ray and Jam Hsiao, both also previously returning singers from season five, finished second and third respectively. This is also the first time none of any new initial singers (outside returning singers) made it to the final round. Additionally, runner-up Ray's became the highest-placing singer who was previously eliminated and advanced via the Breakout round following Aska Yang and Gary Chaw, who also made it to the final round not higher than third place, and Sitar Tan and Lao Lang, both not higher than fourth place.

Despite the announcement on 22 September 2020 that the series would be ending, Mango TV announced in November 2023 that the series would return after nearly four years of hiatus.

== Competition rules ==
Like the previous seasons of I Am a Singer and Singer, it features five rounds of two stages, Qualifier and Knockout, with seven singers performing for a 500-member audience each week. The electronic voting, first appeared as a pre-voting twist in season six and introduced permanently on season seven, where voting (up to three votes) was conducted throughout the performance and accounted for 50% of the final score. As such for past seasons, the scores from both weeks are combined to decide the eliminated singer who received the fewest votes. Unlike the last season, separate scores for paper and electronic votes are not revealed.

The competition reverted to the pre-season three format with Challenge rounds (a round which featured a new singer requiring to rank in the top four to avoid elimination) removed, but instead replaced with a variant round known as Surprise, which in-turn functions similarities to the Substituted singers as well. Three new singers were introduced at the start of the Qualifier round and along with the managers; while on backstage, the singers watched their performance while seated with a microphone stand lever. During the performance, a contestant may pull the lever to issue a challenge to the current contestant, but any current contestants are not aware from their existence until the performance ended. After the challenger performed, an electronic vote will immediately conduct with the results being revealed afterwards (previously after the episode prior to the first round). All three Surprise challenges do not need to be performed on a single episode, but challengers must challenge to a singer within the current elimination round. If at least one challenger succeed in the Surprise round, one contestant from the current lineup will be eliminated at the end of the current Knockout round; if multiple challengers succeed, a re-vote will conduct between the successful singers and the singer with a higher vote advance will replace the eliminated singer, but all successful singers, regardless if they lose the revote will be guaranteed a place in the Breakout round. If all three challengers were unsuccessful, all seven contestants are safe from elimination itself. The final round features a small change in which the Challengers were reduced to two, and no re-vote was conducted for multiple successful singers, meaning that the singers are immediately advanced to the competition and eliminations are conducted as usual. A variant of this twist also apply on the Breakout and Grand Finals where singers who lost the duel were eliminated from the competition regardless of the outcome of the round.

As the season is subtitled Year of the Hits, the contest is suggested for a pool of younger singing talents with an age range of 18 and 35. Contestants are no longer restricted to the songs selection, and may freely choose a song they composed on their own or on someone else.

=== Postponement of premiere and COVID-19 pandemic ===
Like most episodes of I Am a Singer, each episode began taping one week before the airing of the episode. The season began filming on January 3, 2020, with a premiere date announced on January 10; however, the premiere was rescheduled to January 31 to avoid clashing with the Chinese New Year holiday. On January 29, Mango TV announced that the show will be postponed for a week to February 7 due to the ongoing COVID-19 pandemic, and production was postponed until further notice.

After the first Knockout round, all singers returned to their home countries (Hua, Huang and Ray in Beijing, Zhou in Shanghai, Hsiao and Hsu in Taipei, and Misia in Tokyo) to record their performances, known as a "cloud recording"; the host for the first two episodes, Jam Hsiao, was replaced by his manager, Eliza Liang as the host for the remainder of the season, besides Surprise singers, the studio band ensemble, and host Hong Tao, who were the only members present in the studio premises. All of the performances were either pre-recorded or performed live, and results were instead shown through a remote video conference between host Hong Tao and the singers.

Production resumed on February 17, 2020, with further measures enacted such as staggered filming dates. The returning performance for Mao Buyi planned for week three (who was eliminated after the second week) was cancelled, making it the first time eliminated singers (outside previously withdrawn singers) were not given Return performances. The 500-member audience were also absent but instead viewed through live-stream and had votes cast via the Mango TV special livestream website or through their mobile application. These changes were initially enacted until the third Knockout rounds where Mainland Chinese singers were allowed to return to the studios, but other singers remained on their respective cities till the end of the season.

On the finals on April 24 when the show resumed live audience, though safe distancing measures were taken effect. During the finale, host He Jiong revealed the information that the 251 members of the 500-member audience undergo a DNA testing and safety checks before being permitted entry to the studios, while the remaining members watched and judged the performances online.

Almost all of the episodes (with the exception for the tenth week) were delayed from the scheduled time slot at 8.00pm (7.30pm in the finals) due to the extended coverage by Xinwen Lianbo.

== Contestants ==
The following Singer 2020 contestants are listed in alphabetical order. Singers without a placement for the final are listed as finalists and singers who withdrew are listed as withdrawn.

Key:

– Winner
– Runner-up
– Third place
– Other finalist
– Eliminated (not eligible for Breakouts)

Unless otherwise stated, Surprise challenge singers were assigned with temporary music partners, either Jeffery G (round 2 and 3) or Kuo Tao (round 4 or 5). Singers who were not assigned to their partners were reflected as N/A in the Music Partner column.

=== New singers ===
The list only shows successful Surprise Challengers and other contestants with qualifying status.

Contestant	Country	Music Partner	Status	Week Entered	Week Exited	Result
Misia	Japan	Hao Tan (Note: Replaced Huang Tingting as Misia's manager starting on week 2.)	Initial Singer	Week 1 (Qualifier round 1)	Week 12 (Finals)	Finalist (6th-7th place)
Zhou Shen	China	Enti Jin (Note: Cai Chenyu served as Zhou's manager on week 5 due to Enti's absence.)	Initial Singer	Week 1 (Qualifier round 1)	Week 12 (Finals)	Finalist (6th-7th place)
Super Vocal	China	—N/a	Surprise Challenger	Week 7 (Qualifier round 4)	Week 11 (Breakout round)	Eliminated
Mao Buyi	China	JZ Zhou	Initial Singer	Week 1 (Qualifier round 1)	Week 2 (Knockout round 1); Week 11 (Breakout round)	Eliminated
Huang Xiaoyun	China	Kuo Tao	Surprise Challenger	Week 1 (Qualifier round 1)	Week 6 (Knockout Round 3); Week 11 (Breakout round)	Eliminated
Hu Xia	China	—N/a	Surprise Challenger	Week 6 (Knockout round 3)	Week 6 (Knockout round 3); Week 11 (Breakout round)	Eliminated
Gen Sihan	China	—N/a	Surprise Challenger	Week 8 (Knockout round 4)	Week 8 (Knockout round 4); Week 11 (Breakout round)	Eliminated
Summer Jike	China	Shen Mengchen	Surprise Challenger	Week 5 (Qualifier round 3); Week 11 (Breakout round)	Week 9 (Qualifier round 5); Week 12 (Finals)	4th Place
Life Journey	China	—N/a	Surprise Challenger	Week 9 (Qualifier round 5)	Week 10 (Knockout round 5); Week 11 (Breakout round)	Eliminated

=== Returning singers ===
This is the second season to feature former I Am a Singer contestants returning to the competition, after season five. All four singers were given Initial singer status.

Contestant	Country	Music Partner	Previous IAaS performance	Week Entered	Week Exited	Result
Lala Hsu	Taiwan	Leo Li	Season 4 - 4th - 6th place	Week 1 (Qualifier round 1)	Week 12 (Finals)	5th place
Jam Hsiao (Note: Hsiao participated as a band named Lion during his original appearance in season 5.)	Taiwan	Eliza Liang	Season 5 - 3rd place	Week 1 (Qualifier round 1)	Week 12 (Finals)	3rd place
Tia Ray	China	Wang Qiao	Season 5 - 7th place	Week 1 (Qualifier round 1); Week 11 (Breakout round)	Week 8 (Knockout round 4); Week 12 (Finals)	Runner-up
Hua Chenyu	China	Li Weijia	Season 6 - Runner-up	Week 1 (Qualifier round 1)	Week 12 (Finals)	Winner

=== Non-contestants ===
The list of all contesting singers who appeared, but lost in their respective Surprise Challenge, are listed in the table. All of these singers only appeared for one week and were ineligible for the breakouts.

Contestant	Country	Music Partner	Week Entered/Exited
Jeryl Lee	Malaysia	Wei Yan	Week 1 (Qualifier round 1)
Lexie Liu	China	Jeffery G	Week 2 (Knockout round 1)
Ge Bi Lao Fan	China	—N/a	Week 3 (Qualifier round 2)
Pax Congo	China	—N/a	Week 3 (Qualifier round 2)
Zeng Yiming	China	—N/a	Week 4 (Knockout round 2)
Qin Fan Qi	China	—N/a	Week 5 (Qualifier round 3)
Taiyi	China	—N/a	Week 7 (Qualifier round 4)
Ai Re	China	—N/a	Week 10 (Knockout round 5)

== Results ==
First	Safe	Bottom	Eliminated	Surprise Challenger	Won Surprise Challenge
Surprise Challenge Success	Surprise Challenge Failure	Breakout Success	Breakout Failure	Winner	Runner-up

	Singer	Broadcast Date (2020)												
	Singer	7 Feb	14 Feb	21 Feb	28 Feb	6 Mar	13 Mar	20 Mar	27 Mar	3 Apr	10 Apr	17 Apr	24 Apr	
	Singer	1st Round		2nd Round		3rd Round		4th Round		5th Round		Breakouts	Final Round	
	Singer	Qualifying	Knockout	Qualifying	Knockout	Qualifying	Knockout	Qualifying	Knockout	Qualifying	Knockout	Breakouts	1st Round	2nd Round
1	S6 Hua Chenyu	1	1	2	3	1	5	6	3	2	1	—	1	1
2	S5 Tia Ray	6	3	5	4	4	2	5	7	—	—	1	2	2
3	S5 Jam Hsiao	4	2	6	6	6	4	7	4	5	2	—	3	3
4	Summer Jike	—	—	—	—	—	—	4	6	8	—	2	4	4
5	S4 Lala Hsu	5	6	4	1	5	6	2	2	1	4	—	5	—
=6	Charlie Zhou	2	5	3	2	2	1	3	1	3	3	—	—	—
=6	Misia	3	4	1	5	3	3	1	5	4	5	—	—	—
=8	Mao Buyi	7	7	—	—	—	—	—	—	—	—	3	—	—
=8	Life Journey	—	—	—	—	—	—	—	—	6	7	4	—	—
=10	Super Vocal	—	—	—	—	—	—	—	—	7	6	—	—	—
=10	Huang Xiaoyun	—	—	7	7	7	7	—	—	—	—	—	—	—
=10	Gen Sihan	—	—	—	—	—	—	—	—	—	—	—	—	—
=10	Hu Xia	—	—	—	—	—	—	—	—	—	—	—	—	—
=14	Ai Re	—	—	—	—	—	—	—	—	—	—	—	—	—
=14	Taiyi	—	—	—	—	—	—	—	—	—	—	—	—	—
=14	Qi Fan Qi	—	—	—	—	—	—	—	—	—	—	—	—	—
=14	Zeng Yiming	—	—	—	—	—	—	—	—	—	—	—	—	—
=14	Pax Congo	—	—	—	—	—	—	—	—	—	—	—	—	—
=14	Ge Bi Lao Fan	—	—	—	—	—	—	—	—	—	—	—	—	—
=14	Lexie Liu	—	—	—	—	—	—	—	—	—	—	—	—	—
=14	Jeryl Lee	—	—	—	—	—	—	—	—	—	—	—	—	—

== Competition details ==
=== First round ===
==== Qualifying ====
- Recording Date: January 3, 2020
- Airing date: February 7, 2020

The first two Surprise Challengers introduced this week were Jeryl Lee and Huang Xiaoyun.

Singer 2020 Qualifier Round 1 February 7, 2020 Host: Jam Hsiao
Order	Singer	Music Partner	Song Title	Original Singer	Lyricist	Composer	Arranger	Rank
1	Charlie Zhou	Enti Jin	"大鱼"	Charlie Zhou	Yi Yue	Qian Ray	Baby Chung	2
2	Tia Ray	Wang Qiao	"我爱"	Tia Ray	Malay; Trey Cambell; Tia Ray; Li Cong	Malay; Trey Cambell; Tia Ray	Michael Ning; Julian Waterfall Pollack	6
3	Jeryl Lee	Wei Yan	"I Wanna Be Free"	Jeryl Lee	Hurng-Yi Wang	Dennis Lau		Surprise Challenge Failure
4	Mao Buyi	JZ Zhou	"借”	Mao Buyi			Daridan	7
5	Huang Xiaoyun	Kuo Tao	"少年他的奇幻漂流"	Mayday	Ashin	Stone	Nick Pyo	Surprise Success
6	Lala Hsu	Leo Li	"一样的月光"	Lala Hsu			Steven Lai	5
6	Lala Hsu	Leo Li	"城里的月光"	Jam Hsiao; Mavis Hee; Sharon Au	Tan Kah Beng		Steven Lai	5
7	Misia	Huang Tingting	"逢いたくていま (Missing You Now)" (Japanese)	Misia		Jun Sasaki		3
8	Jam Hsiao	Eliza Liang	"皮囊"	Jam Hsiao	Qu Shicong		Ah Huo; Presto'C	4
9	Hua Chenyu	Li Weijia	"寒鸦少年"	Hua Chenyu	Ding Yanxue	Hua Chenyu	Zheng Nan; Hua Chenyu	1

==== Knockout ====
- Recording Date: January 10, 2020
- Airing date: February 14, 2020

The Surprise Challenger introduced this week is Lexie Liu. Due to Huang Xiaoyun being successful in her Surprise Challenge last week, one singer would be eliminated this week.

Singer 2020 Knockout Round 1 February 14, 2020 Host: Jam Hsiao
Order	Singer	Music Partner	Song Title	Original Singer	Lyricist	Composer	Arranger	Rank
1	Tia Ray	Wang Qiao	"不亏不欠"	Tia Ray	Cheung Cho Kiu	Khris Riddick-Tynes; Leon Thomas III; Debbie Aramide	Huang Yun Xun; Zhang Yiyu	3
2	Misia	Hao Tan	"銀の龍の背に乗って(Ride on the Silver Dragon's Back)" (Japanese)	Miyuki Nakajima			Nick Pyo	4
2	Misia	Hao Tan	"最初的梦想"	FanFan	Daryl Yao	Miyuki Nakajima	Nick Pyo	4
3	Mao Buyi	JZ Zhou	"一荤一素"	Mao Buyi			Zhao Zhao	7
4	Charlie Zhou	Enti Jin	"在水一方"	Kang Lui	Chiung Yao	Lin Chia-ching	Baby Chung; Yiyang	5
4	Charlie Zhou	Enti Jin	"愿得一心人"	Charlie Zhou	Yi Yue	Qian Ray	Baby Chung; Yiyang	5
5	Lala Hsu	Leo Li	"对的时间点"	JJ Lin	Xiaohan	JJ Lin	Howe Chen 田雅欣	6
5	Lala Hsu	Leo Li	"遇见"	Stefanie Sun	Kevin Yi	Chet Lam	Howe Chen 田雅欣	6
6	Hua Chenyu	Li Weijia	"斗牛"	Hua Chenyu	Pei Yu	Hua Chenyu	Zheng Nan; Hua Chenyu	1
7	Lexie Liu	Jeffery G	"Manta"	Lexie Liu			Lexie Liu; Femke Weideman; Kenn Wu; Bijan Amir; CJ Wheeler; Wong Kong Hao	Surprise Challenge Failure
8	Jam Hsiao	Eliza Liang	"那女孩对我说"	Rachel Liang; Yida Huang	Kevin Yi	Lee Shih Shiong	Ludwig Lim; Ah Huo; Joel Voo	2

==== Surprise Challenge results ====
Singer 2020 Knockout 1st Round Surprise Challenge results
Order	Singer	Votes	Valid Votes	Results
1	Jeryl Lee	239	486	Surprise Challenge Failure
1	Tia Ray	247	486	Surprise Challenge Failure
2	Huang Xiaoyun	289	495	Surprise Success
2	Mao Buyi	206	495	Surprise Success
3	Lexie Liu	90	499	Surprise Challenge Failure
3	Hua Chenyu	409	499	Surprise Challenge Failure

==== Overall ranking ====
Huang Xiaoyun had succeeded in her challenge and was given contestant status, which resulted in the lowest-ranked contestant, Mao Buyi, to be eliminated.

Singer 2019 1st Round overall ranking
Ranking	Singer	Match 1 Percentages of votes (ranking)	Match 2 Percentages of votes (ranking)	Total percentages of votes
1	Hua Chenyu	22.24% (1)	24.45% (1)	23.345%
2	Charlie Zhou	20.98% (2)	13.63% (5)	17.305%
3	Misia	17.50% (3)	13.76% (4)	15.635%
4	Jam Hsiao	15.70% (4)	15.43% (2)	15.565%
5	Lala Hsu	11.89% (5)	10.82% (6)	11.355%
6	Tia Ray	6.55% (6)	14.36% (3)	10.455%
7	Mao Buyi	5.14% (7)	7.55% (7)	6.345%

=== Second round ===
==== Qualifying ====
- Recording Date: February 17, 2020
- Airing date: February 21, 2020

The new Surprise challengers were Ge Bi Lao Fan and Pax Congo.

Singer 2020 Qualifier Round 2 February 21, 2020 Host: Eliza Liang
Order	Singer	Music Partner	Song Title	Original Singer	Lyricist	Composer	Arranger	Rank
1	Huang Xiaoyun	Kuo Tao	"你的答案"	A Rong; Zi Yao	Lin Chen Yang; Liu Tao	Liu Tao		7
2	Ge Bi Lao Fan	Jeffery G	"多想在平庸的生活拥抱你"	隔壁老樊				Surprise Challenge Failure
3	Misia	Hao Tan	"Toward Tomorrow"（Japanese）	Misia		Toshiaki Matsumoto		1
4	Tia Ray	Wang Qiao	"有一种悲伤"	A-Lin	Gavin Lin	Alex Chang Jien		5
5	Jam Hsiao	Eliza Liang	"太阳"	Pika Chiu				6
6	Pax Congo	Jeffery G	"安排好的人生"	Pax Congo				Surprise Challenge Failure
7	Hua Chenyu	Li Weijia	"你要相信这不是最后一天"	Hua Chenyu	Pei Yu	Hua Chenu	Zheng Nan; Hua Chenyu	2
8	Lala Hsu	Leo Li	"小半"	Chen Li	Hsu Lingzi	Chen Li	Steven Lai	4
9	Charlie Zhou	Enti Jin	"能解答一切的答案"	Charlie Zhou	Walter Evaner	Liu Boyong		3

==== Knockout ====
- Recording Date: February 23, 2020
- Airing date: February 28, 2020

The Surprise Challenger introduced in this episode was Zeng Yiming.

Singer 2020 Knockout Round 2 February 28, 2020 Host: Eliza Liang
Order	Singer	Music Partner	Song Title	Original Singer	Lyricist	Composer	Arranger	Rank
1	Tia Ray	Wang Qiao	"Love Can Fly"	Tia Ray		Chang Shilei		4
2	Charlie Zhou	Enti Jin	"无问"	Mao Buyi				2
3	Misia	Hao Tan	"未来へ (To the Future)"（Japanese）	Kiroro	Chiharu Tamashiro			5
4	Jam Hsiao	Eliza Liang	"纯金打造"	Jam Hsiao	Hsia Yu	Peter Kam		6
5	Zeng Yiming	Jeffery G	"第一滴泪"	Power Station	Adam Hsu	Kinny Liu		Surprise Challenge Failure
6	Hua Chenyu	Li Weijia	"荒野魂斗罗"	Hua Chenyu	Ding Yanxue	Hua Chenyu		3
7	Huang Xiaoyun	Kuo Tao	"打开"	Huang Xiaoyun	Miguo	Huang Xiaoyun		7
8	Lala Hsu	Leo Li	"我还年轻 我还年轻"	Your Woman Sleep with Others	Zhang Lichang	Your Woman Sleep with Others		1

==== Surprise Challenge results ====
Singer 2020 Knockout 2nd Round Surprise Challenge results
Order	Singer	Votes	Valid Votes	Results
1	Ge Bi Lao Fan	204	488	Surprise Challenge Failure
1	Huang Xiaoyun	284	488	Surprise Challenge Failure
2	Pax Congo	218	484	Surprise Challenge Failure
2	Jam Hsiao	266	484	Surprise Challenge Failure
3	Zeng Yiming	181	489	Surprise Challenge Failure
3	Jam Hsiao	308	489	Surprise Challenge Failure

==== Overall ranking ====
Huang Xiaoyun would have been eliminated for finishing last but due to all three Contestants failing their surprise challenge, all seven contestants were declared safe from elimination.

Singer 2020 2nd Round overall ranking
Ranking	Singer	Match 1 Percentages of votes (ranking)	Match 2 Percentages of votes (ranking)	Total percentages of votes
1	Hua Chenyu	23.83% (2)	16.87% (3)	20.355%
2	Misia	25.34% (1)	11.34% (5)	18.345%
3	Charlie Zhou	17.84% (3)	18.56% (2)	18.205%
4	Lala Hsu	11.85% (4)	22.40% (1)	17.125%
5	Tia Ray	10.67% (5)	15.92% (4)	13.295%
6	Jam Hsiao	5.79% (6)	9.92% (6)	7.855%
7	Huang Xiaoyun	4.68% (7)	4.99% (7)	4.835%

=== Third round ===
==== Qualifying ====
- Recording Date: February 29, 2020
- Airing date: March 6, 2020

The Surprise Challengers introduced this week are Qin Fan Qi and Summer Jike. Cai Chengyu temporarily replaced Enti Jin as Shen's manager for this round. Hsiao was not allowed to be challenged because of him being challenged twice in a row.

Singer 2020 Qualifier Round 3 March 6, 2020 Host: Eliza Liang
Order	Singer	Music Partner	Song Title	Original Singer	Lyricist	Composer	Arranger	Rank
1	Jam Hsiao	Eliza Liang	"好的 晚安"	Deng Jian Chao				6
2	Charlie Zhou	Cai Chengyu	"Monsters"	Katie Sky	Caleb Shapiro; Bjarte Ludvigsen; Robert Ziff Resnick; Mads Vathne Lervik; Catherine Beatrice Cheadle			2
3	Huang Xiaoyun	Kuo Tao	"连名带姓"	A-Mei	David Ke	Jay Chou		7
4	Qin Fan Qi	Jeffery G	"不透气的房间"	Qin Fan Qi				Surprise Challenge Failure
5	Tia Ray	Wang Qiao	"凄美地"	Guo Ding				4
6	Summer Jike	Jeffery G	"Power To Forgive"	Summer Jike	Stefan Fernande; Niko Westelinck			Surprise Success
7	Misia	Hao Tan	"つつみ込むように… (Tsutsumikomu Yō ni...)"（Japanese）	Misia	Satoshi Shimano		Hiroshi MATSUI	3
8	Hua Chenyu	Li Weijia	"我们"	Eason Chan	David Ke	Chen Chien-Chi		1
9	Lala Hsu	Leo Li	"言不由衷"	Lala Hsu	Eve Ai			5

==== Knockouts ====
- Recording Date: March 6, 2020
- Airing date: March 13, 2020

The Surprise Challenger introduced this week was Hu Xia. Due to Summer Jike being successful in her Surprise Challenge last week, one singer would be eliminated this week. Starting this week, remaining Mainland Chinese singers returned to Changsha to do their pre-recorded performance; the 500-member audience would still have to use the Mango TV app watch and vote on their performances.

Singer 2020 Knockout Round 3 March 13, 2020 Host: Eliza Liang
Order	Singer	Music Partner	Song Title	Original Singer	Lyricist	Composer	Arranger	Rank
1	Misia	Hao Tan	"What a Wonderful World"	Celine Dion; Libera; Louis Armstrong	Bob Thiele; George David Weiss			3
2	Hua Chenyu	Li Weijia	"神树"	Hua Chenyu	Pei Yu	Hua Chenyu		5
3	Tia Ray	Wang Qiao	"月牙湾"	F.I.R.	Kevin Yi; Xie Youhui	Real Huang		2
4	Jam Hsiao	Eliza Liang	"微光"	Cici Yuan				4
5	Charlie Zhou	Enti Jin	"达尼亚"	Pu Shu				1
5	Charlie Zhou	Enti Jin	"红莓花儿开"	Soviet Union Folk Song	Mikhail Isakovsky	Isaak Dunayevsky		1
6	Huang Xiaoyun	Kuo Tao	"我用所有报答爱"	Jane Zhang	Fan Xueyi	Tan Dun		7
7	Lala Hsu	Leo Li	"不难"	Lala Hsu	David Ke	Lala Hsu		6
8	Hu Xia	Jeffery G	"张三的歌"	Lee Shou-chuan	Zhang Zishi			Surprise Success

==== Surprise Challenge results ====
Singer 2020 Knockout 3rd Round Surprise Challenge results
Order	Singer	Votes	Valid Votes	Results
1	Qin Fan Qi	187	491	Surprise Challenge Failure
1	Huang Xiaoyun	304	491	Surprise Challenge Failure
2	Summer Jike	274	486	Won Surprise Challenge
2	Tia Ray	212	486	Won Surprise Challenge
3	Hu Xia	292	493	Won Surprise Challenge
3	Lala Hsu	201	493	Won Surprise Challenge
Revote	Summer Jike	252	492	Surprise Challenge Success
Revote	Hu Xia	240	492	Eliminated

==== Overall ranking ====
Both Summer Jike and Hu Xia were successful in their Surprise Challenge, which resulted in the lowest-ranked contestant, Huang Xiaoyun, to be eliminated. A revote revealed Jike receiving a higher vote than Hu and replaced Huang from the competition. Since Hu was successful in his surprise challenge, he is eligible for Breakouts.

Singer 2020 3rd Round overall ranking
Ranking	Singer	Match 1 Percentages of votes (ranking)	Match 2 Percentages of votes (ranking)	Total percentages of votes
1	Charlie Zhou	17.38%（2）	18.88%（1）	18.135%
2	Hua Chenyu	23.53%（1）	12.31%（5）	17.925%
3	Tia Ray	15.15%（4）	17.13%（2）	16.145%
4	Misia	15.48%（3）	16.26%（3）	15.875%
5	Lala Hsu	12.58%（5）	12.12%（6）	12.355%
6	Jam Hsiao	9.80%（6）	13.59%（4）	11.695%
7	Huang Xiaoyun	6.08%（7）	9.71%（7）	7.895%

=== Fourth round ===
==== Qualifying ====
- Recording Date: March 13, 2020
- Airing date: March 20, 2020

The two Surprise Challengers introduced this week were Taiyi and Super Vocal.

Singer 2020 Qualifier Round 4 March 20, 2020 Host: Eliza Liang
Order	Singer	Music Partner	Song Title	Original Singer	Lyricist	Composer	Arranger	Rank
1	Hua Chenyu	Li Weijia	"降临"	Hua Chenyu	Ding Yanxue	Hua Chenyu	Zheng Nan; Hua Chenyu	6
2	Taiyi	Kuo Tao	"玉"	Taiyi				Surprise Challenge Failure
3	Tia Ray	Wang Qiao	"存·不存在"	Tia Ray	Yu Hong Long; Ape Kao	Yu Hong Long		5
4	Lala Hsu	Leo Li	"Last Dance"	Wu Bai				2
5	Jam Hsiao	Eliza Liang	"我只想要一个人的感觉"	Cubick Xiao	Jam Hsiao			7
6	Super Vocal		"你的色彩" (Ni De Se Cai / Qui Con Me)	Super Vocal	Italian: Saverio Principini Chinese: Cheng He	Roxanne Seeman, Ivo Moring, George Komsky		Surprise Success
7	Charlie Zhou	Enti Jin	"有可能的夜晚"	Yico Zeng				3
8	Summer Jike	—	"直来直往"	Stephanie Sun	Vincent Fang; Shuo Hsiao	Lee Shih Shiong		4
9	Misia	Hao Tan	"行かないで" (Ikanaide)(Japanese)	Koji Tamaki	Gorō Matsui	Koji Tamaki		1

==== Knockouts ====
- Recording Date: March 20, 2020
- Airing date: March 27, 2020

The Surprise Challenger introduced this week was Gen Sihan. Due to Super Vocal being successful in their Surprise Challenge last week, one singer would be eliminated this week.

Singer 2020 Knockout Round 4 March 27, 2020 Host: Eliza Liang
Order	Singer	Music Partner	Song Title	Original Singer	Lyricist	Composer	Arranger	Rank
1	Lala Hsu	Leo Li	"半途而废"	Faye Wong	Tom Pan			2
2	Hua Chenyu	Li Weijia	"新世界"	Hua Chenyu	Ding Yanxue	Hua Chenyu	Zheng Nan; Hua Chenyu	3
3	Tia Ray	Wang Qiao	"我想"	Yu Jiayun				7
3	Tia Ray	Wang Qiao	"I Love You 3000 II"	Jackson Wang	Jackson Wang; Stephanie Poetri			7
4	Jam Hsiao	Eliza Liang	"你啊你啊"	Waa Wei				4
5	Misia	Hao Tan	"Into The Light"	Misia		Hiroshi Matsui		5
6	Charlie Zhou	Enti Jin	"達拉崩吧"	Luo Tianyi; YANHE	ilem			1
6	Charlie Zhou	Enti Jin	"極楽浄土"（Gokurakuzyoudo） (Japanese)	GARNiDELiA	Toku; MARiA			1
7	Summer Jike	—	"彩色的黑"	Summer Jike	Yiu Him	Fingazz		6
8	Gen Sihan	Kuo Tao	"鼓樓先生"	Wang Fanrui				Surprise Success

==== Surprise Challenge results ====
Singer 2020 Knockout 4th Round Surprise Challenge results
Order	Singer	Votes	Valid Votes	Results
1	Taiyi	242	495	Surprise Challenge Failure
1	Hua Chenyu	253	495	Surprise Challenge Failure
2	Super Vocal	356	488	Won Surprise Challenge
2	Jam Hsiao	132	488	Won Surprise Challenge
3	Summer Jike	230	498	Won Surprise Challenge
3	Gen Sihan	268	498	Won Surprise Challenge
Revote	Super Vocal	257	493	Surprise Challenge Success
Revote	Gen Sihan	236	493	Eliminated

==== Overall ranking ====
Both Super Vocal and Gen Sihan were successful in their Surprise Challenge, which resulted in the lowest-ranked contestant, Tia Ray, to be eliminated. A revote revealed Super Vocal receiving a higher vote than Gen and replaced Tia from the competition. Since Gen was successful in his surprise challenge, he is eligible for Breakouts.

Singer 2020 4th Round overall ranking
Ranking	Singer	Match 1 Percentages of votes (ranking)	Match 2 Percentages of votes (ranking)	Total percentages of votes
1	Charlie Zhou	16.13% (3)	21.13% (1)	18.635%
2	Lala Hsu	18.89% (2)	17.57% (2)	18.235%
3	Misia	21.53% (1)	12.88% (5)	17.205%
4	Hua Chenyu	7.56% (6)	16.09% (3)	11.825%
5	Summer Jike	14.91% (4)	8.72% (6)	11.815%
6	Jam Hsiao	6.75% (7)	15.83% (4)	11.295%
7	Tia Ray	14.23% (5)	7.78% (7)	11.005%

=== Fifth round ===
==== Qualifying ====
- Recording Date: March 30, 2020
- Airing date: April 3, 2020

The number of Surprise Challengers in the Ultimate Round were reduced by one to two singers. Unlike previous rounds, singers who won the Surprise challenge were immediately qualified as a place in the round, while other singers were eligible for elimination. The Surprise challenger this week is a band named Life Journey. Due to a successful challenge by The Life Journey, the singer with a lower vote count, Summer Jike, was eliminated. Unlike previous Qualifying rounds, this round only reveal the first and last placed singers and the middle placements for the other five were not shown until the next episode.

Singer 2020 Qualifier Round 5 April 3, 2020 Host: Eliza Liang
Order	Singer	Music Partner	Song Title	Original Singer	Lyricist	Composer	Arranger	Rank
1	Jam Hsiao	Eliza liang	"披星戴月的想你"	Accusefive	Pan Yanshan	Pam Yunan		5
2	Super Vocal	—	"Radioactive"	Imagine Dragons; Pentatonix	Alexander Grant; Ben McKee; Josh Mosser; Daniel Platzman; Dan Reynolds; Wayne Sermon			7
3	Life Journey	Kuo Tao	"永远都会在"	Life Journey	Zijun Huang; Wei Wei			Surprise Success 6
4	Charlie Zhou	Enti Jin	"相思"	Mao Amin	Chou Xiaoyuan	Sanbao		3
4	Charlie Zhou	Enti Jin	"秦淮景"（Wu）	Hsu Huifen; Wu Jianfang; Chang Jianfeng	Qigang Chen			3
5	Misia	Hao Tan	"アイノカタチ feat.HIDE(GReeeeN)" (Ai no Katachi) (Japanese)	Misia; HIDE	GReeeeN			4
6	Hua Chenyu	Li Weijia	"好想爱这个世界啊"	Hua Chenyu	Pei Yu	Hua Chenyu	Zheng Nan]	2
7	Summer Jike	—	"不要怕"（Yi）	瓦其依合	Moxi Zishi			8
8	Lala Hsu	Leo Li	"大艺术家"	Jolin Tsai	Yan Yunnong	Robin Jessen; Anne Judith Wik; Nermin Harambasic; Ronny Svendsen; Charite Viken Reinas; Eirik Johansen; Alexander Puntervold		1

==== Knockout ====
- Recording Date: March 31, 2020
- Airing date: April 10, 2020

The final Surprise Challenger introduced this season is Ai Re. Due to the shorter gap between airing of the last episode and taping of this episode, the episode was spoiled as it was revealed that Summer Jike was eliminated prior to the previous episode's airing (since she didn't appear on this episode) and its Surprise Challenger, Life Journey (later revealed to have ranked 6th in the previous episode), replaced Jike as a result of the successful challenge.

Singer 2020 Knockout Round 5 April 10, 2020 Host: Eliza Liang
Order	Singer	Music Partner	Song Title	Original Singer	Lyricist	Composer	Arranger	Rank
1	Charlie Zhou	Enti Jin	"自己按门铃，自己听"	Charlie Zhou	Gao Xiaosong			3
2	Lala Hsu	Leo li	"克卜勒"	Stephanie Sun	Hush			4
3	Super Vocal	—	"春风十里"	鹿先森樂队	Kuo Beibei			6
4	Misia	Hao Tan	"Can't Take My Eyes Off You"	Frankie Valli; Jessica Jay	Bob Crewe; Bob Gaudio			5
5	Life Journey	—	"逝去的歌"	Life Journey	A Si	Wei Wei		7
6	Ai Re	Kuo Tao	"用音乐安慰你"	Ai Re				Surprise Challenge Failure
7	Hua Chenyu	Li Weijia	"疯人院"	Hua Chenyu	You Ng	Hua Chenyu		1
8	Jam Hsiao	Eliza Liang	"Haunting Me"	Jam Hsiao	Andrea Apuy	Alexander Wong; Alan Hsia		2

==== Surprise Challenge results ====
Singer 2020 Knockout 5th Round Surprise Challenge results
Order	Singer	Votes	Valid Votes	Results
1	Life Journey	309	493	Surprise Challenge Success
1	Super Vocal	184	493	Surprise Challenge Success
2	Ai Re	219	487	Surprise Challenge Failure
2	Life Journey	266	487	Surprise Challenge Failure

==== Overall ranking ====
Singer 2020 5th Round overall ranking
Ranking	Singer	Match 1 Percentages of votes (ranking)	Match 2 Percentages of votes (ranking)	Total percentages of votes
1	Hua Chenyu	18.36% (2)	19.57% (1)	18.965%
2	Lala Hsu	19.48% (1)	16.06% (4)	17.775%
3	Jam Hsiao	13.02% (5)	18.92% (2)	15.975%
4	Charlie Zhou	15.47% (3)	16.28% (3)	15.875%
5	Misia	14.13% (4)	15.31% (5)	14.725%
6	Super Vocal	9.63% (7)	8.41% (6)	9.025%
7	Life Journey	9.91% (6)	5.44% (7)	7.675%

=== Breakout ===
- Recording Date: April 11, 2020
- Airing date: April 17, 2020

The five initial singers, Jam Hsiao, Lala Hsu, Hua Chenyu, Misia, and Charlie Zhou, were exempt in the Breakout round. The eight participating in the Breakouts, Gen Sihan, Hu Xia, Huang Xiaoyun, Summer Jike, Life Journey, Mao Buyi, Super Vocal, and Tia Ray, compete for the last two places in the Finals.

Similar to the previous Breakout rounds since season six, mid-eliminations occur during the round - eight singers were each grouped into four duels of two, and while the first singer performed, any remaining singers can issue a challenge to perform; if none of the singers elected to perform, the singer have the choice to choose of his/her preference. After all eight singers have performed, an electronic vote will conduct for all four duels; defeated singers were immediately eliminated (Breakout failure), leaving victorious singers eligible for the finals (Breakout success), based on the votes received for this round.

For this episode, few of the solo singers (with the exception of band members) have prepared temporary Music Partners for the performances, indicated in italics.

Singer 2020 Breakout April 10, 2020 Host: Eliza Liang
Order	Singer	Music Partner	Song Title	Original Singer	Lyricist	Composer	Arranger	Rank
1	Hu Xia	Enti Jin	"花期"	Hu Xia				—
2	Mao Buyi	JZ Zhou	"深夜一角"	Mao Buyi				3
3	Gen Sihan	Shen Ling	"你的一生我只借一晚"	Wu Yao	Mumu	Xinruan		—
4	LifeJourney	—	"Bye Bye"	旅行团乐队	Wei Wei; Wu Tsing-fong	Wei Wei		4
5	Summer Jike	Shen Mengchen	"交出邦尼"	Summer Jike				2
6	Huang Xiaoyun	Kuo Tao	"我们的爱"	F.I.R.	F.I.R. ie Youhui	F.I.R.		—
7	Tia Ray	Wang Qiao	"盛夏光年"	Mayday	Ashin			1
8	Super Vocal	—	" I Surrender (Chinese)"	Celine Dion	Louiselou	Sam Watters		—

==== Duel results ====
Singer 2020 Breakout Duel Results
Order	Singer	Votes	Valid Votes	Results
1	Hu Xia	183	493	Lost Duel/Breakout Failure
1	Mao Buyi	309	493	Won Duel
2	Gen Sihan	230	489	Lost Duel/Breakout Failure
2	LifeJourney	259	489	Won Duel
3	Summer Jike	316	488	Won Duel
3	Huang Xiaoyun	172	488	Lost Duel/Breakout Failure
4	Tia Ray	328	485	Won Duel
4	Super Vocal	157	485	Lost Duel/Breakout Failure

==== Total percentages of votes ====
Singer 2020 Breakout Total percentages of votes
Ranking	Singer	Total percentages of votes
1	Tia Ray	38.04%
2	Summer Jike	28.59%
3	Mao Buyi	20.69%
4	LifeJourney	12.68%

=== Finals ===
The finals were divided into two rounds, with the first song being a duet with a guest singer and the second song being a solo encore performance. Similar to the finals since season six, votes cast were the sole determinant of the season's winner. The finals were conduct in a live studio using both live and online audience.

- Airing date: April 24, 2020

==== Round 1 ====
The first round of the finals featured a guest singer's duet. For this round, breakout-success singers (Tia Ray and Summer Jike ) will still be able to do duels to any one of the five initial singers, with the losing singer eliminated from the competition; after all the singers had performed for the round, a second vote will conduct to eliminate a third singer from the competition.

Singer 2020 Finals Round 1 April 24, 2020 Host: He Jiong
Order	Singer	Music Partner	Guest Singer	Song Title	Original Singer	Lyricist	Composer	Arranger	Rank
1	Jam Hsiao	Eliza Liang	JJ Lin	"Hello"	Jam Hsiao; JJ Lin	Milk Six	Jam Hsiao; JJ Lin	Alex D Ah Huo	3
2	Lala Hsu	Leo Li	William Wei	"管他什么音乐"	Mavis Fan	He Qi Hong	Mavis Fan; Kaneki Yoshinori		5
3	Misia	Hao Tan	Little Black Dress-RYO	"さよならの向う側" (Japanese) (Sayonarano Mukougawa)	Momoe Yamaguchi	Yoko Aki	Ryudo Uzaki		—
4	Tia Ray	Wang Qiao	Victor Ma	"2020 So Crazy"					2
5	Charlie Zhou	Enti Jin	New Pants	"不会说拜拜的Disco"	New Pants				—
6	Summer Jike	Kuo Tao	Xu Weizhou	"Mad Man Killer"	Summer Jike	代岳东	Mr. Fantastic		4
7	Hua Chenyu	Li Weijia	Li Yuchun	"西门少年"	Li Yuchun				1

Had Hsu, Misia and Zhou advanced to the next round, their encore songs were respectively "以上皆非", "Everything", and "不想睡".

===== Duel results =====
Singer 2020 Grand Finals Round 1 Duel results
Order	Singer	Votes	Valid Votes	Results
1	Tia Ray	312	485	Won Duel
1	Misia	173	485	Lost Duel/Eliminated
2	Jike Junyi	291	488	Won Duel
2	Charlie Zhou	197	488	Lost Duel/Eliminated

==== Round 2 ====
The second round of the finals featured an encore song, and the singer who received the most votes (separate from the previous round's votes) was crowned the winner. The order of the round is determined by the placements from the first round.

Singer 2020 Finals Round 2 April 24, 2020 Host: He Jiong
Order	Singer	Music Partner	Song Title	Original Singer	Lyricist	Composer	Arranger	Rank
1	Summer Jike	Kuo Tao	"好女孩"	Josie and the Uni Boys; Mavis Fan	Mavis Fan	Kubert Leung	Gu Li	4
2	Jam Hsiao	Eliza Liang	"猴笼"	Tones and I	Nai Liu		A Huo; Zheng Ren Hao	3
3	Tia Ray	Wang Qiao	"Starfall"	Tia Ray	TetraCalyx	Zoe Tsai		2
4	Hua Chenyu	Li Weijia	"哥谭" (七重人格)	Hua Chenyu	Loo Yi Qiu	Hua Chenyu	Zheng Nan; Hua Chenyu	1

==== Winner of Battle ====
Hua Chenyu was declared the winner of ''Singer 2020'' with 51.12% of the votes cast, leading by a 20.44% margin ahead of runner-up Tia Ray.

Singer 2020 Results of Winner of Battle
Ranking	Singer	Total percentages of votes
1	Hua Chenyu	51.12%
2	Tia Ray	30.68%
3	Jam Hsiao	15.54%
4	Summer Jike	2.66%
