= Ivo Moring =

- Born: August 27, 1971 (age 54); Hamburg, Germany
- Genres: Pop
- Occupations: Record producer, songwriter, percussionist
- Years active: 2001–present

Ivo Moring (born August 27, 1971) is a German record producer, songwriter, and percussionist, best known for his work with DJ Otzi as co-producer of "Ein Stern". He has worked with Heather Nova, Darren Hayes of Savage Garden, Jennifer Paige, Sarah Brightman, Limahl, Jordan Knight & New Kids On The Block, Cazzette, Sarah Connor, Lutricia McNeal, Chris Norman, Oonagh, Beyond the Black, Christina Stürmer, and Sandra und Coolio.

== Career ==
Moring began playing percussion professionally in the orchestra of the Hamburg State Opera.

Ivo Moring has worked with Heather Nova, Darren Hayes of Savage Garden, Jennifer Paige, Sarah Brightman, Limahl, Jordan Knight & New Kids on the Block, Sarah Connor, Lutricia McNeal, Chris Norman, Beyond the Black, Sandra und Coolio.

In 2007, he co-produced "Ein Stern" by DJ Otzi, peaking at number one and remaining on the chart for 12 weeks. It became the second most successful song in German chart history.

Ivo Moring composed 60 minutes of music in 7.1 surround-sound for the Blu-ray-movie project BluElement's Forsenses, released worldwide in 2009. It became the best selling national music Blu-ray DVD in Germany. The follow-up film Timberlounge reached the Top 10 in the national DVD-chart.

Moring was the co-writer of "Nie Genug" by Christina Stürmer, "Space Cowboy", and "Perfect Love". He produced "Idiot", which received the award for "Hit of the Year 2012" in Germany.

In 2014, he produced and co-wrote two albums by Oonagh, receiving two ECHO-awards.

Moring co-wrote "Blind Heart" by Swedish-based DJ Duo Cazzette, which reached number one on the Billboard Dance Chart in 2015.

Moring produced an album for Wendy Starland, who played a role in discovering Lady Gaga. In a Billboard story after winning her case against Rob Fusari, Starland stated "We've created a stadium rock sound that is not something I've heard before from any other female solo artist".

In 2016, Moring and BMG Rights Management founded "EduArtists", a label for educational music for children. In 2018 Moring wrote and produced an album in nine different languages for the international language learning platform Bambino Lingo. He developed Fabi Fuchs, a music brand for children, with the first album released by Amazon originals in 2018. He was also significantly involved in the development and production of the children's brands "Lena, Felix & Kita-Kids", "Major&Melody", "Schnabi Schnabel" and the German adaptation of the brand "Heavysaurus". The YOGINIES, developed together with designer Franca Wrage, teaches children about sustainability and mindfulness.

In 2018, Moring was a producer of Meteor by Matthias Reim. Meteor reached number 3 on the German albums chart.

Moring released numerous songs and productions in the style of downbeat, zero-beat, chill-out, ambient and lounge. International album-releases of his own projects include TRANQUILLO and SUGARMAN.

On March 20, 2020, China's first male bel canto quartet, Super Vocal, performed "Qui con me (Ni De Se Cai)" ("Your Colors") on the Hunan Satellite TV singing competition Singer 2020, bilingual with Italian and Chinese lyrics. The performance received more than 40 million views in 24 hours. The studio version single of "Ni De Se Cai" was released on March 27, 2020, by Decca China. "Ni De Se Cai" was composed by George Komsky, Roxanne Seeman, and Moring with Italian lyrics “Qui Con Me" written by Saverio Principini, and Chinese lyrics "Ni De Se Cai" written by Cheng He. The song was produced by Nick Patrick and Wu Qinglong.
