= The Voice of China season 4 =

The Voice of China
- Season 4
- Hosted by: Hu Qiaohua
- Judges: Na Ying; Harlem Yu; Wang Feng; Jay Chou
- Winner: Zhang Lei 张磊
- Winning coach: Na Ying
- Runner-up: Tifa Chen 陈梓童
- Finals venue: Beijing National Stadium

Release
- Original network: Zhejiang Television
- Original release: 17 July – 7 October 2015

Season chronology
- ← Previous; Season 3

The fourth and final season of the Chinese reality talent show The Voice of China premiered on 17 July 2015 on Zhejiang Television. Hu Qiaohua continued his role as host, while Na Ying and Wang Feng returned for their fourth and third consecutive seasons as coaches, respectively. Former coach Harlem Yu, who returned after a one-season absence, and Jay Chou joined the coaching panel following the departures of Chyi Chin and Yang Kun.

For this season, the team sizes were reduced to 12 per team, down from 16 last season. Due to the possibility of having multiple potential winners on the same team, this season would see the show moving to a format more similar to the American version of the show. In the Playoff rounds, the final 16 would compete against each other, with the eliminations adjusted to eliminate contestants who earned the lowest number of votes, regardless of which team they are in, thus not guaranteeing a coach and an artist in the finals. Also, the number of finalists increased from four to five.

On 7 October 2015, Zhang Lei of Team Na Ying was announced as the winner of the season, with Tifa Chen of Team Jay as runner-up. Tan Xuanyuan of Team Harlem, Beibei of Team Wang Feng, and Leon Lee of Team Jay finished in third, fourth, and fifth place respectively. This season is also Na Ying's third win and final victory throughout the series of the show. making Na Ying first coach to win more than two seasons.

== Coaches and hosts ==
The Voice of China season 4 coaches

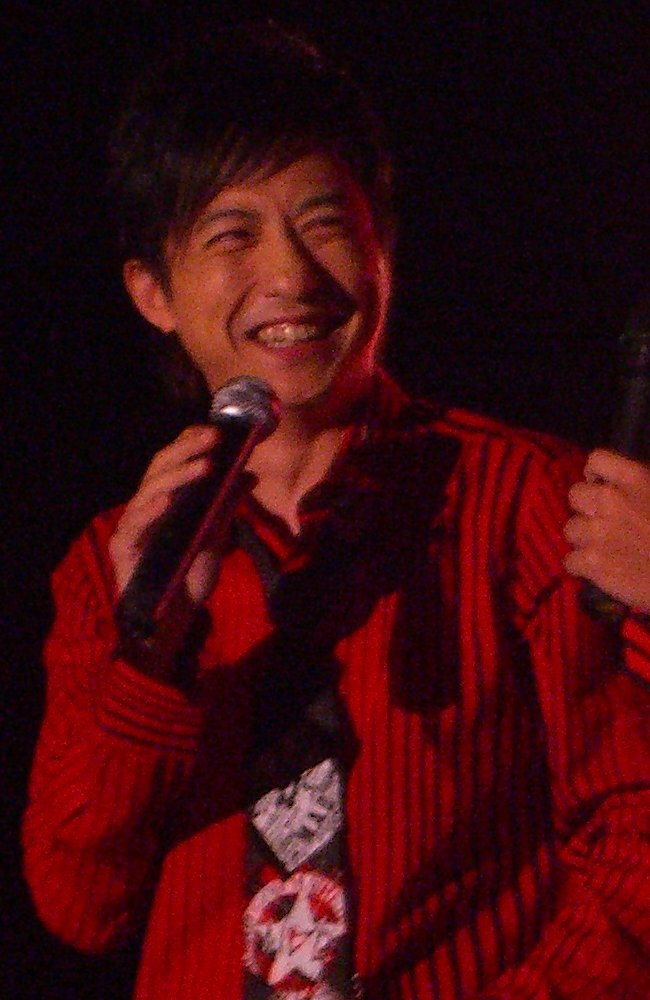
Harlem Yu

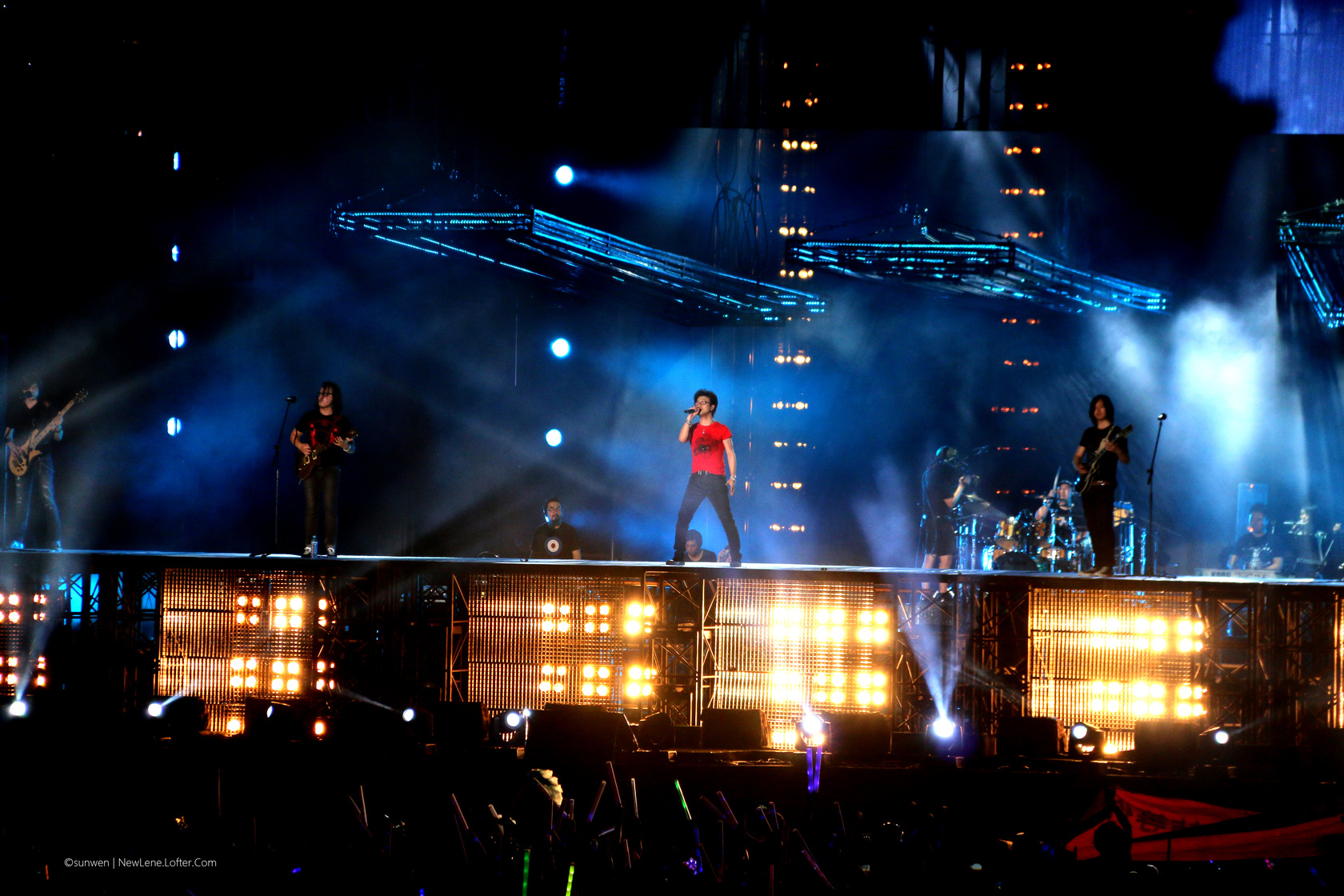
Wang Feng

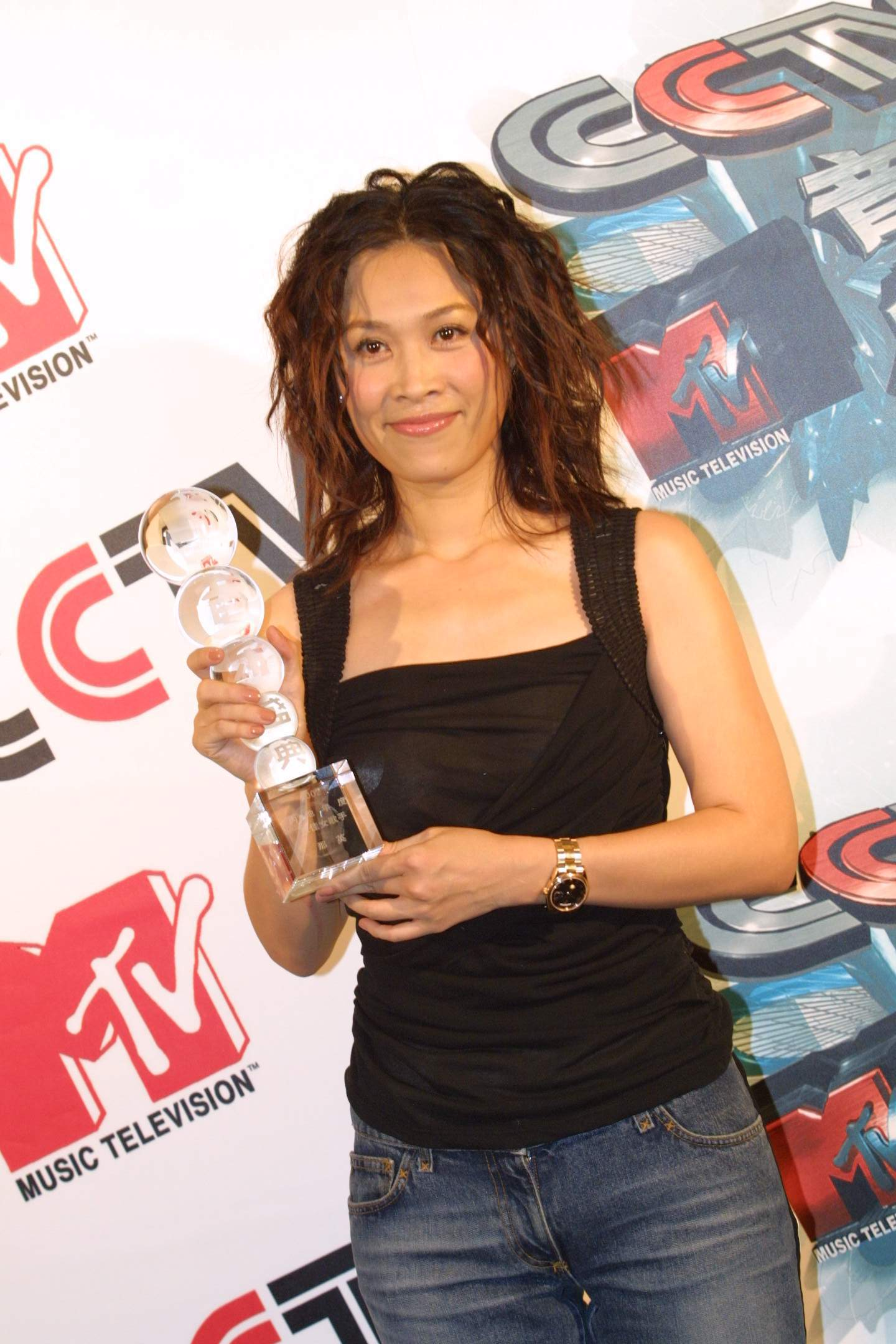
Na Ying

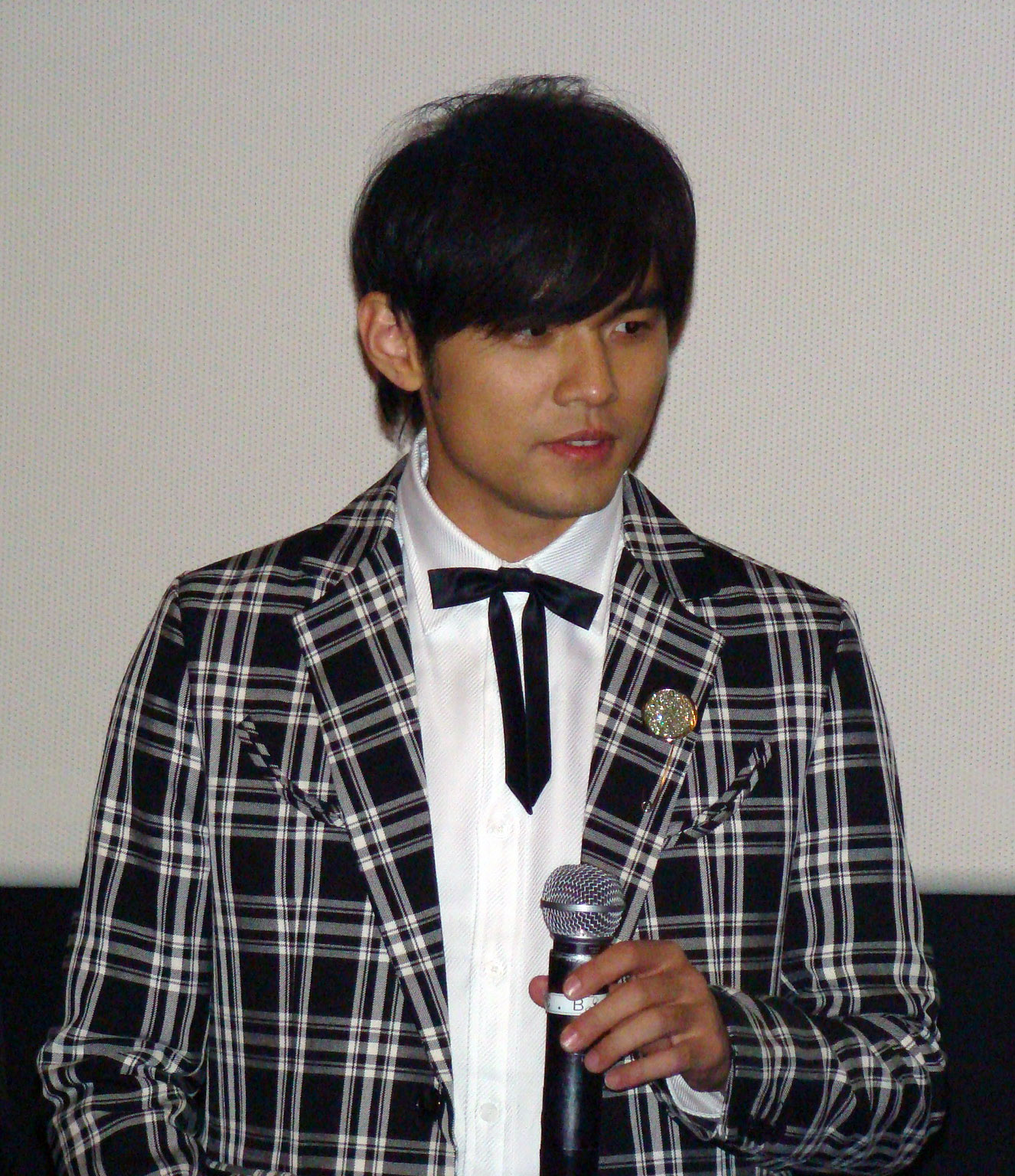
Jay Chou

The coaching panel once again saw a change as Na Ying and Wang Feng were rejoined by Harlem Yu, who returned from a one-season hiatus. The trio was joined by Jay Chou, who was a new addition to the panel. Chyi Chin and Yang Kun did not return from the previous season. Hu Qiaohua returned as host.

Individuals rumoured to serve as the advisors for this season included A-mei, Eason Chan, G.E.M. and Li Jian. On 14 August 2015, it was revealed on the final episode of the blind auditions that G.E.M. would be serving as the advisor for Team Wang Feng, Li for Team Na Ying, JJ Lin for Team Harlem and A-mei for Team Jay.

== Teams ==
Colour key

- Winner
- Runner-up
- Third place
- Fourth place
- Fifth place
- Eliminated in the Top 10 Playoffs
- Eliminated in the Cross Battle rounds
- Eliminated in the Knockout rounds
- Eliminated in the Battle rounds

Coaches	Top 48 artists			
Harlem Yu				
Harlem Yu	Tan Xuanyuan 谭轩辕	Ika Zhao 赵大格	Lotus Zhang 张姝	Ma Yinyin 马吟吟
Harlem Yu	Rex Li 李文豪	Tong Yushuo 童予硕	Jaffri Cao 曹景豪	Jóhannes Koo 古振邦
Harlem Yu	Li Wenhui 李文慧	Ray Duan 段欣芮	Usay Kawlu 舞思爱·羔露	Wang Di 王帝
Wang Feng				
Wang Feng	Beibei 贝贝	Huang Yong 黄勇	Huang Xiaoyun 黄霄雲	Zhang Xinxin 张鑫鑫
Wang Feng	Heo Chul 许哲	Zhang Bolin 张博林	Bek 别日克	Huang Kai 黄恺
Wang Feng	Lin Yan 林燕	Wang Feixue 王飞雪	Xiu'er 修儿	Yang Baoxin 杨宝心
Na Ying				
Na Ying	Zhang Lei 张磊	Sun Bolun 孙伯纶	Shuhei Nagasawa 长宇	Vanatsaya Viseskul 朗嘎拉姆
Na Ying	Kiki Li 李嘉琪	Zhang Nan 张楠	Chenyo 晨悠	Leonala Ling 凌菱
Na Ying	Saya Chang 张惠春	Su Hao 苏浩	Zhou Xiaoxiao 周晓晓	Zhu Qiang 朱强
Jay Chou				
Jay Chou	Tifa Chen 陈梓童	Leon Lee 李安	Gin Lee 李幸倪	Sharon Kwan 关诗敏
Jay Chou	Samuel Huang 黄圣文	Will Jay 刘伟男	Abigail Garza 李安安	Jeffery Zhang 张旸
Jay Chou	Jiang Yuandong 江源东	Lim Xu 徐林	Michael Liu 柳畅源	Zhan Xiaoli 詹小栎

== Blind auditions ==
The taping of the blind auditions began on 17 June 2015, and ended on 5 August 2015.

This season saw the introduction of the "double-blind auditions", which gave some of the artists the opportunity (or requested by the producers) to perform behind a translucent blind on stage, and only reveal themselves to the coaches and audiences after their performances. The "double-blind auditions" format was featured on the show on episode two and four for Lin Yan's and Tong Yushuo's performances respectively.

Colour key

✔	Coach hit his or her "I WANT YOU" button
	Artist defaulted to this coach's team
	Artist elected to join this coach's team
	Artist eliminated with no coach pressing his or her "I WANT YOU" button

=== Episode 1 (17 July) ===
The four coaches performed a medley of each other's songs – Na Ying performed Jay Chou's "青花瓷", Wang Feng performed Harlem Yu's "春泥", Chou performed Na's "默", and Yu performed Wang's "一起摇摆".

Order	Artist	Age	Hometown	Song	Coach's and artist's choices			
Order	Artist	Age	Hometown	Song	Harlem	Feng	Ying	Jay
1	Tifa Chen 陈梓童	25	Nanjing, Jiangsu	"双截棍"	✔	✔	✔	✔
2	Tan Xuanyuan 谭轩辕	26	Chongqing	"Still Loving You"	✔	✔	✔	—
3	Zhu Qiang 朱强	24	Changle, Fujian	"但愿人长久"	✔	—	✔	✔
4	Beibei 贝贝	27	Wuhan, Hubei	"花火"	✔	✔	✔	✔
5	Lim Xu 徐林	27	Quanzhou, Fujian	"姐姐"	✔	—	✔	✔
6	Vanatsaya Viseskul 朗嘎拉姆	16	Thailand	"千言万语"	—	—	—	—
7	Leon Lee 李安	21	Sydney, Australia	"逝去的爱"	✔	✔	✔	✔

=== Episode 2 (24 July) ===
Season one runner-up Momo Wu returned to the stage to perform "舞底线", a soundtrack from the film Monster Hunt.

Order	Artist	Age	Hometown	Song	Coach's and artist's choices			
Order	Artist	Age	Hometown	Song	Harlem	Feng	Ying	Jay
1	Yang Baoxin 杨宝心	21	Shangzhi, Heilongjiang	"Are You Ready"	—	✔	✔	✔
2	Ika Zhao 赵大格	19	Shenzhen, Guangdong	"All About That Bass" / "我在人民广场吃炸鸡"	✔	✔	✔	✔
3	Saya Chang 张惠春	38	Taitung, Taiwan	"怎么说我不爱你"	—	—	✔	—
4	Shuhei Nagasawa 长宇	20	Canada	"氧气"	✔	—	✔	—
5	Will Jay 刘伟男	19	Hollywood, Los Angeles	"Lemon Tree"	✔	✔	✔	✔
6	Ren Boru 任柏儒	40	Liaoning	"不再让你孤单"	—	—	—	—
7	Usay Kawlu 舞思爱·羔露	26	Hualien, Taiwan	"如果没有你"	✔	✔	✔	—
8	Sun Bolun 孙伯纶	33	Harbin, Heilongjiang	"如果你也听说"	—	—	✔	✔
9	Lin Yan 林燕	39	Xiamen, Fujian	"别来纠缠我"	—	✔	✔	—

=== Episode 3 (31 July) ===
Order	Artist	Age	Hometown	Song	Coach's and artist's choices			
Order	Artist	Age	Hometown	Song	Harlem	Feng	Ying	Jay
1	Zhang Nan 张楠	22	Heihe, Heilongjiang	"逃亡"	—	—	✔	—
2	Lotus Zhang 张姝	26	Changchun, Jilin	"一起摇摆"	✔	✔	✔	✔
3	Zhang Lei 张磊	34	Mudanjiang, Heilongjiang	"南山南"	✔	✔	✔	—
4	Wang Feixue 王飞雪	30	Tangshan, Hebei	"柏拉图之恋2060"	—	✔	✔	—
5	Wang Di 王帝	23	Qingdao, Shandong	"别找我麻烦"	✔	—	—	—
6	Michael Liu 柳畅源	21	Los Angeles	"双截棍"	✔	—	✔	✔
7	Pu Yue 蒲悦	17	Dazhou, Sichuan	"梨花又开放"	—	—	—	—
8	Jiang Yuandong 江源东	22	Lu'an, Anhui	"昨夜小楼又东风"	✔	—	✔	✔
9	Ma Yinyin 马吟吟	27	Kunming, Yunnan	"海上花"	✔	✔	—	—
10	Huang Xiaoyun 黄霄雲	16	Luodian, Guizhou	"你"	✔	✔	—	—

=== Episode 4 (7 August) ===
Order	Artist	Age	Hometown	Song	Coach's and artist's choices			
Order	Artist	Age	Hometown	Song	Harlem	Feng	Ying	Jay
1	Ray Duan 段欣芮	23	Dazhou, Sichuan	"算你狠"	✔	—	—	—
2	Huang Yong 黄勇	31	Changde, Hunan	"太阳"	—	✔	✔	—
3	Leonala Ling 凌菱	28	Chengdu, Sichuan	"为爱痴狂"	—	—	✔	—
4	Abigail Garza 李安安	23	Manila, Philippines	"I Surrender" / "没离开过"	—	—	—	✔
5	Gin Lee 李幸倪	29	Johor Bahru, Malaysia	"心痛"	—	—	✔	✔
6	Rex Li 李文豪	24	Wanzhou, Chongqing	"思念是一种病" / "See You Again"	✔	—	—	✔
7	Li Wenhui 李文慧	21	Ürümqi, Xinjiang	"Yellow" / "流星"	✔	✔	—	—
8	Chenyo 晨悠 (Ginny Kuo 郭惟晨 & Monica Wu 吴以悠)	24 / 19	Chiayi City, Taiwan / Taitung, Taiwan	"野子"	✔	✔	✔	—
9	Bek 别日克	35	Karamay, Xinjiang	"Señorita"	✔	✔	✔	—
10	Sharon Kwan 关诗敏	19	Los Angeles	"晴天"	—	—	✔	✔
11	Huang Kai 黄恺	26	Changsha, Hunan	"Better Man"	✔	✔	✔	✔
12	Zhan Xiaoli 詹小栎	39	Qingdao, Shandong	"弯弯的月亮"	—	—	✔	✔
13	Kiki Li 李嘉琪	21	Hong Kong	"漫步"	—	—	✔	✔
14	Tong Yushuo 童予硕	19	Guiyang, Guizhou	"对爱渴望"	✔	✔	✔	✔

=== Episode 5 (14 August) ===
This episode was dubbed as the "finale of the blind auditions", which featured mostly rejected artists (who failed to get any chair-turn on their first try) returning to compete in the revival round. The revival round was brought in after all the 150 artists has performed, and all teams were still left with vacancies the coaches failed to fill up with. Harlem Yu and Wang Feng were left with one spot in their teams, while Na Ying and Jay Chou were left with two.

Order	Artist	Age	Hometown	Song	Coach's and artist's choices			
Order	Artist	Age	Hometown	Song	Harlem	Feng	Ying	Jay
1	Zhang Bolin 张博林	17	Shijiazhuang, Hebei	"Home"	—	✔	✔	✔
2	Zhang Xinxin 张鑫鑫	25	Turpan, Xinjiang	"秋天"	—	✔	—	—
3	Heo Chul 许哲	33	Changchun, Jilin	"生来彷徨"	—	✔	—	—
4	Jaffri Cao 曹景豪	24	Keelung, Taiwan	"心的距离"	✔	—	✔	—
5	Zhou Xiaoxiao 周晓晓	27	Wuhan, Hubei	"温柔"	—	—	✔	—
Revival round
6	Du Xingying 杜星萤	20	Wuhan, Hubei	"得不到的爱情"	—	—	—	—
7	Jeffery Zhang 张旸	37	Auckland, New Zealand	"菊花台"	—	—	—	✔
8	Vanatsaya Viseskul 朗嘎拉姆	16	Thailand	"独上西楼"	—	—	✔	—
9	Ren Boru 任柏儒	40	Liaoning	"牡丹亭外"	—	—	—	—
10	Xiu'er 修儿	25	Cangzhou, Hebei	"张三的歌"	—	✔	—	—
11	Pu Yue 蒲悦	18	Dazhou, Sichuan	"如果有来生"	—	Team full	—	—
12	Jóhannes Koo 古振邦	24	Ipoh, Malaysia	"Say Something"	✔	Team full	—	—
13	Su Hao 苏浩	23	Baotou, Inner Mongolia	"单行的轨道"	Team full	Team full	✔	—
14	Iky Loke 陆蔚綝	28	Ipoh, Malaysia	"到不了"	Team full	Team full	Team full	—
15	Samuel Huang 黄圣文	36	Hsinchu, Taiwan	"印第安老斑鸠" / "I Got You (I Feel Good)" / "Fallin'"	Team full	Team full	Team full	✔

== The Battles ==
The taping of the Battle rounds (together with the Knockout rounds) began on 17 August 2015 for Team Wang Feng, and later on 19 August 2015 for Team Jay. Team Na Ying's and Team Harlem's episodes were taped on 23 and 25 August 2015, respectively. The Battles were featured on the first half of the episodes aired on 21, 28 August and 6, 11 September 2015.

Season four's advisors are G.E.M. for Team Wang Feng, A-mei for Team Jay, Li Jian for Team Na Ying and JJ Lin for Team Harlem. Continuing with the format used in the previous seasons, coaches of the other teams and the respective team advisor were allowed to provide recommendations to the team coach on who they should advance to the next round. However, the recommendations would not have an effect on the outcome of the results as the final decisions lie solely on the team coaches themselves. Artists who won their battle will advance to the Knockout rounds.

Arnold Schwarzenegger made a brief appearance at the start of the sixth episode to announce the commencement of the Battle rounds, as part of the promotional efforts for the film Terminator Genisys.

Colour key

Artist won the Battle and advanced to the Knockouts
Artist lost the Battle and was eliminated

Episode	Coach	Order	Winner	Song	Loser	Coach's recommendations				
Episode	Coach	Order	Winner	Song	Loser	Harlem	Feng	Ying	Jay	Advisor
Episode 6 (21 August)	Wang Feng	1	Zhang Bolin 张博林	"Jailhouse Rock"	Yang Baoxin 杨宝心	Bolin	—N/a	Baoxin	Bolin	Baoxin
Episode 6 (21 August)	Wang Feng	2	Huang Xiaoyun 黄霄雲	"I Believe"	Wang Feixue 王飞雪	Xiaoyun	—N/a	Feixue	Xiaoyun	Xiaoyun
Episode 6 (21 August)	Wang Feng	3	Heo Chul 许哲	"曾经的你"	Bek 别日克	Chul	—N/a	Bek	Bek	Chul
Episode 6 (21 August)	Wang Feng	4	Huang Yong 黄勇	"从头再来"	Lin Yan 林燕	Yan	—N/a	Yan	Yan	Yong
Episode 6 (21 August)	Wang Feng	5	Zhang Xinxin 张鑫鑫	"少年锦时"	Huang Kai 黄恺	Xinxin	—N/a	Xinxin	Xinxin	Xinxin
Episode 6 (21 August)	Wang Feng	6	Beibei 贝贝	"我的天空"	Xiu'er 修儿	Xiu'er	—N/a	Beibei	Beibei	Beibei
Episode 7 (28 August)	Na Ying	1	Zhang Nan 张楠	"Mama"	Zhou Xiaoxiao 周晓晓	Xiaoxiao	Nan	—N/a	Xiaoxiao	Nan
Episode 7 (28 August)	Na Ying	2	Shuhei Nagasawa 长宇	"每天爱你多一些"	Chenyo 晨悠	Chenyo	Chenyo	—N/a	Chenyo	Shuhei
Episode 7 (28 August)	Na Ying	3	Sun Bolun 孙伯纶	"最长的电影"	Su Hao 苏浩	Bolun	Hao	—N/a	Hao	Bolun
Episode 7 (28 August)	Na Ying	4	Vanatsaya Viseskul 朗嘎拉姆	"红豆"	Leonala Ling 凌菱	Leonala	Vanatsaya	—N/a	Vanatsaya	Leonala
Episode 7 (28 August)	Na Ying	5	Zhang Lei 张磊	"车站"	Zhu Qiang 朱强	Qiang	Lei	—N/a	Lei	Lei
Episode 7 (28 August)	Na Ying	6	Kiki Li 李嘉琪	"真的爱你" / "Amani"	Saya Chang 张惠春	Saya	Saya	—N/a	Kiki	Kiki
Episode 8 (6 September)	Jay Chou	1	Tifa Chen 陈梓童	"刀剑如梦"	Michael Liu 柳畅源	Tifa	Tifa	Tifa	—N/a	Tifa
Episode 8 (6 September)	Jay Chou	2	Sharon Kwan 关诗敏	"自己" / "Reflection"	Abigail Garza 李安安	Sharon	Sharon	Abigail	—N/a	Abigail
Episode 8 (6 September)	Jay Chou	3	Gin Lee 李幸倪	"红尘客栈"	Jeffery Zhang 张旸	Jeffery	Gin	Jeffery	—N/a	Jeffery
Episode 8 (6 September)	Jay Chou	4	Leon Lee 李安	"剪爱" / "Hero"	Jiang Yuandong 江源东	Leon	Yuandong	Yuandong	—N/a	Yuandong
Episode 8 (6 September)	Jay Chou	5	Samuel Huang 黄圣文	"比较大的大提琴" / "水手怕水"	Zhan Xiaoli 詹小栎	Samuel	Samuel	Xiaoli	—N/a	Samuel
Episode 8 (6 September)	Jay Chou	6	Will Jay 刘伟男	"Just the Way You Are" / "稻香"	Lim Xu 徐林	Lim	Lim	Will	—N/a	Will
Episode 9 (11 September)	Harlem Yu	1	Lotus Zhang 张姝	"燕尾蝶"	Li Wenhui 李文慧	—N/a	Lotus	Lotus	Wenhui	Lotus
Episode 9 (11 September)	Harlem Yu	2	Ika Zhao 赵大格	"亲密爱人"	Ray Duan 段欣芮	—N/a	Ika	Ika	Ray	Ika
Episode 9 (11 September)	Harlem Yu	3	Rex Li 李文豪	"叶子"	Jóhannes Koo 古振邦	—N/a	Jóhannes	Jóhannes	Rex	Rex
Episode 9 (11 September)	Harlem Yu	4	Ma Yinyin 马吟吟	"情人的眼泪"	Usay Kawlu 舞思爱·羔露	—N/a	Yinyin	Yinyin	Usay	Usay
Episode 9 (11 September)	Harlem Yu	5	Tong Yushuo 童予硕	"表白"	Wang Di 王帝	—N/a	Yushuo	Di	Di	Yushuo
Episode 9 (11 September)	Harlem Yu	6	Tan Xuanyuan 谭轩辕	"It's My Life"	Jaffri Cao 曹景豪	—N/a	Xuanyuan	Jaffri	Jaffri	Xuanyuan

== The Knockouts ==
The Knockouts, which were taped together with the Battles, were featured on the second half of the episodes aired on 21, 28 August and 6, 11 September 2015. Similar to the Battles, coaches of the other teams and the respective team advisor were allowed to provide recommendations to the team coach on who they should advance to the next round, and once again they would not have an effect of the final outcome.

A new element was added in this season where each of the coaches were given one "double selection" power to save both contestants of a Knockout pair from elimination and advance them to the next round of competition. The top 16 contestants will then move on to the Playoffs.

Colour key

Artist won the Knockout and advanced to the Playoffs
Artist lost the Knockout and was eliminated

Episode	Coach	Order	Song	Winner(s)	Loser	Song	Coach's recommendations				
Episode	Coach	Order	Song	Winner(s)	Loser	Song	Harlem	Feng	Ying	Jay	Advisor
Episode 6 (21 August)	Wang Feng	1	"鱼"	Huang Xiaoyun 黄霄雲	Zhang Bolin 张博林	"Boys 'Round Here"	Xiaoyun	—N/a	Xiaoyun	Xiaoyun	Xiaoyun
Episode 6 (21 August)	Wang Feng	1	"鱼"	Huang Xiaoyun 黄霄雲	Zhang Bolin 张博林	"Boys 'Round Here"	Bolin	—N/a	Xiaoyun	Xiaoyun	Xiaoyun
Episode 6 (21 August)	Wang Feng	2	"恒星"	Zhang Xinxin 张鑫鑫	N/A (double selection)		Beibei	—N/a	Beibei	Beibei	Beibei
Episode 6 (21 August)	Wang Feng	2	"存在"	Beibei 贝贝	N/A (double selection)		Beibei	—N/a	Xinxin	Xinxin	Xinxin
Episode 6 (21 August)	Wang Feng	3	"执着"	Huang Yong 黄勇	Heo Chul 许哲	"再见青春"	Yong	—N/a	Chul	Yong	Yong
Episode 7 (28 August)	Na Ying	1	"Friend" / "Dear Friend"	Shuhei Nagasawa 长宇	Zhang Nan 张楠	"一整夜不睡觉"	Shuhei	Nan	—N/a	Shuhei	Shuhei
Episode 7 (28 August)	Na Ying	1	"Friend" / "Dear Friend"	Shuhei Nagasawa 长宇	Zhang Nan 张楠	"一整夜不睡觉"	Nan	Nan	—N/a	Shuhei	Shuhei
Episode 7 (28 August)	Na Ying	2	"直觉"	Sun Bolun 孙伯纶	N/A (double selection)		Bolun	Bolun	—N/a	Bolun	Bolun
Episode 7 (28 August)	Na Ying	2	"船"	Zhang Lei 张磊	N/A (double selection)		Lei	Lei	—N/a	Lei	Lei
Episode 7 (28 August)	Na Ying	3	"爱人"	Vanatsaya Viseskul 朗嘎拉姆	Kiki Li 李嘉琪	"Price Tag"	Kiki	Vanatsaya	—N/a	Vanatsaya	Kiki
Episode 8 (6 September)	Jay Chou	1	"Bang Bang"	Tifa Chen 陈梓童	N/A (double selection)		Tifa	Tifa	Tifa	—N/a	Tifa
Episode 8 (6 September)	Jay Chou	1	"Yesterday"	Leon Lee 李安	N/A (double selection)		Leon	Leon	Leon	—N/a	Leon
Episode 8 (6 September)	Jay Chou	2	"听见下雨的声音"	Sharon Kwan 关诗敏	Samuel Huang 黄圣文	"Uptown Funk"	Sharon	Sharon	Sharon	—N/a	Sharon
Episode 8 (6 September)	Jay Chou	3	"爱是永恒"	Gin Lee 李幸倪	Will Jay 刘伟男	"还是会"	Gin	Gin	Gin	—N/a	Gin
Episode 9 (11 September)	Harlem Yu	1	"安眠药"	Lotus Zhang 张姝	N/A (double selection)		—N/a	Ika	Ika	Lotus	Ika
Episode 9 (11 September)	Harlem Yu	1	"New Soul"	Ika Zhao 赵大格	N/A (double selection)		—N/a	Ika	Ika	Lotus	Ika
Episode 9 (11 September)	Harlem Yu	2	"告别的时代"	Tan Xuanyuan 谭轩辕	Rex Li 李文豪	"你的背包"	—N/a	Xuanyuan	Rex	Xuanyuan	Xuanyuan
Episode 9 (11 September)	Harlem Yu	3	"离歌"	Ma Yinyin 马吟吟	Tong Yushuo 童予硕	"迷宫"	—N/a	Yinyin	Yinyin	Yushuo	Yinyin

== The Playoffs and live show ==
The Playoffs began on 18 September and comprised episodes 10, 11, and 13, aired over three weeks. They were followed by the live show on the fourth week, the final phase of the competition.

From this point on in the competition, unlike previous seasons where the artists would compete against their own team members in the Playoffs for a spot in the finals, the remaining artists went head-to-head against artists from the other teams, which introduced the possibility of having a group of finalists without equal team representation.

=== Week 1–2: The Cross Battles (18, 25 September) ===
The first two weeks of the Playoff rounds saw the introduction of a brand new competition format, the Cross Battles, where the coaches had to compete with an opposing coach with their remaining artists. Through the drawing of lots, it was decided that Team Na Ying would go against Team Jay in the tenth episode, and Team Wang Feng would battle with Team Harlem in the eleventh.

In a Cross Battle, an artist would be sent by his or her coach to compete against an artist from the opposing team. The selection of the artists and their order of appearance were all decided by their respective coaches, and all of which were done without the knowledge of the opposing coach. Therefore, the battle pairings were completely by random, and would only be revealed when the coaches appeared with their selected artist on stage. At the end of each Cross Battle round, the artist receiving the most votes from the media judging panel would advance to the next Playoff round. The 51-person media judging panel was made up of 26 veteran record producers and music critics, together with 25 media practitioners from various media companies, and each of them was entitled to one vote per battle pairing.

Each of the coaches was allowed to save one losing artist from their respective team, and they had to decide on the spot if they would like to exercise the power on the artist once he or she was announced as the loser of a battle. If the losing coach decides not to, the artist would be immediately eliminated. The two artists that were saved by the coaches (one from each team) would then perform again in the "coach's save" round, with the one receiving the most media votes moving on to the Top 10. In the event when there was only one saved contestant as the opposing coach failed to exercise his or her power, the only saved contestant would be given walkover and automatically advance to the next round without having to perform again.

Colour key

Artist won the Cross Battle and advanced to the Top 10
Artist lost the Cross Battle but was saved by coach
Artist won the Cross Battle in the "coach's save" round and advanced to the Top 10
Artist lost the Cross Battle and was eliminated

Episode	Coach	Order	Artist	Song	Media votes	Result
Episode 10 (18 September)	Na Ying	1.1	Shuhei Nagasawa 长宇	"心动"	23	Eliminated
Episode 10 (18 September)	Jay Chou	1.2	Gin Lee 李幸倪	"Angel"	28	Media's vote
Episode 10 (18 September)	Na Ying	2.1	Vanatsaya Viseskul 朗嘎拉姆	"一剪梅"	13	Eliminated
Episode 10 (18 September)	Jay Chou	2.2	Tifa Chen 陈梓童	“可爱女人”	38	Media's vote
Episode 10 (18 September)	Na Ying	3.1	Zhang Lei 张磊	"虎口脱险"	47	Media's vote
Episode 10 (18 September)	Jay Chou	3.2	Leon Lee 李安	"爱我还是他"	4	Jay's save
Episode 10 (18 September)	Na Ying	4.1	Sun Bolun 孙伯纶	"像疯了一样"	28	Media's vote
Episode 10 (18 September)	Jay Chou	4.2	Sharon Kwan 关诗敏	"Brown Eyes" / "恋人未满"	23	Eliminated
Episode 10 (18 September)	Coach's save performances					
Episode 10 (18 September)	Jay Chou	—N/a	Leon Lee 李安	Given walkover as Na Ying failed to save an artist from her team		
Episode 11 (25 September)	Harlem Yu	1.1	Ika Zhao 赵大格	"Ain't No Mountain High Enough"	28	Media's vote
Episode 11 (25 September)	Wang Feng	1.2	Huang Xiaoyun 黄霄雲	"All by Myself"	23	Eliminated
Episode 11 (25 September)	Harlem Yu	2.1	Lotus Zhang 张姝	"你的甜蜜"	26	Media's vote
Episode 11 (25 September)	Wang Feng	2.2	Beibei 贝贝	"大桥上"	25	Wang Feng's save
Episode 11 (25 September)	Harlem Yu	3.1	Tan Xuanyuan 谭轩辕	"欲水"	26	Media's vote
Episode 11 (25 September)	Wang Feng	3.2	Zhang Xinxin 张鑫鑫	"封锁线"	25	Eliminated
Episode 11 (25 September)	Harlem Yu	4.1	Ma Yinyin 马吟吟	"三天三夜"	20	Harlem's save
Episode 11 (25 September)	Wang Feng	4.2	Huang Yong 黄勇	"流浪"	31	Media's vote
Episode 11 (25 September)	Coach's save performances					
Episode 11 (25 September)	Harlem Yu	1	Ma Yinyin 马吟吟	"在水一方"	21	Eliminated
Episode 11 (25 September)	Wang Feng	2	Beibei 贝贝	"蓝莲花"	30	Media's vote

Non-competition performances
Order	Performers	Song
10.1	Na Ying & her team (Shuhei Nagasawa 长宇, Sun Bolun 孙伯纶, Vanatsaya Viseskul 朗嘎拉姆 & Zhang Lei 张磊)	"烟花易冷"
10.2	Jay Chou & his team (Tifa Chen 陈梓童, Gin Lee 李幸倪, Leon Lee 李安 & Sharon Kwan 关诗敏)	"你的微笑" / "出卖" / "屋顶"
11.1	Harlem Yu & his team (Ika Zhao 赵大格, Lotus Zhang 张姝, Ma Yinyin 马吟吟 & Tan Xuanyuan 谭轩辕)	"春天里"
11.2	Wang Feng & his team (Beibei 贝贝, Huang Xiaoyun 黄霄雲, Huang Yong 黄勇 & Zhang Xinxin 张鑫鑫)	"让我一次爱个够"

=== Week 3: Top 10 (30 September) ===
The Top 10 performed on the third week of the Playoffs for a spot in the finals. The order of appearance was decided through the drawing of lots by the coaches. In deciding who moves on, a professional judging panel made up of 27 veteran record producers and music critics, as well as the studio audience made up of 360 members of the public (including media practitioners from various media companies) were given an equal say. Each of the voters was entitled to one vote per artist, and they can either choose to vote or not vote for a particular artist. The total number of votes cast by the professional judging panel and studio audience were converted into points accordingly to the weightage (50% each). The five artists with the highest accumulated total points would advance to the finals.

The cast of Lost in Hong Kong Xu Zheng, Bao Bei'er, Du Juan, and the theme songwriter Zhao Yingjun made an appearance at the start of the show to promote the film. Xu and Zhao also participated in the "double-blind auditions", with Na Ying and Wang Feng hitting their "I WANT YOU" buttons for the performance.

Colour key

Artist received the highest accumulated total points and advanced to the finals
Artist received the lowest accumulated total points and was eliminated

Episode	Coach	Order	Artist	Song	Judges votes (points)	Public votes (points)	Total points	Result
Episode 13 (30 September)	Harlem Yu	1	Ika Zhao 赵大格	"蓝旗袍"	20 (37.0)	319 (44.3)	81.3	Eliminated
Episode 13 (30 September)	Jay Chou	2	Tifa Chen 陈梓童	"If I Ain't Got You"	23 (42.6)	335 (46.5)	89.1	Advanced
Episode 13 (30 September)	Wang Feng	3	Beibei 贝贝	"想念真好"	18 (33.3)	350 (48.6)	81.9	Advanced
Episode 13 (30 September)	Na Ying	4	Sun Bolun 孙伯纶	"忘记拥抱"	21 (38.9)	309 (42.9)	81.8	Eliminated
Episode 13 (30 September)	Harlem Yu	5	Lotus Zhang 张姝	"一个人"	13 (24.1)	313 (43.5)	67.6	Eliminated
Episode 13 (30 September)	Jay Chou	6	Gin Lee 李幸倪	"秋意浓"	11 (20.4)	318 (44.2)	64.6	Eliminated
Episode 13 (30 September)	Wang Feng	7	Huang Yong 黄勇	"沧浪之歌"	7 (12.9)	331 (45.9)	58.8	Eliminated
Episode 13 (30 September)	Na Ying	8	Zhang Lei 张磊	"寂寞是因为思念谁"	25 (46.3)	348 (48.3)	94.6	Advanced
Episode 13 (30 September)	Harlem Yu	9	Tan Xuanyuan 谭轩辕	"Carrie"	21 (38.9)	338 (46.9)	85.8	Advanced
Episode 13 (30 September)	Jay Chou	10	Leon Lee 李安	"再回首"	19 (35.2)	353 (49.0)	84.2	Advanced

Non-competition performances
Order	Performers	Song
13.1	Xu Zheng & Zhao Yingjun	"一生中最爱"

=== Week 4: Finals (7 October) ===
The Top 5 performed in the two-part season finale on 7 October 2015, held at the Beijing National Stadium. In the first round of the competition, the five finalists performed a duet with their respective coach, then a solo song. Based on the public votes received from the live audience at the end of the first round, the bottom three artists with the fewest votes were eliminated.

The final two artists then sang their winner's song in the second round of the competition, with the 101-person media judging panel and live audience voting for the winner. Every member of the media judging panel was entitled to one vote, and each vote represents one point. The public votes received from the live audience were converted into points based on the total number of the votes received by the final two contestants. The artist who received the highest accumulated total points was announced as the winner.

Coach	Artist	Order	Duet song (with coach)	Order	Solo song	Order	Winner's song	Public votes	Media votes	Total points	Result
Jay Chou	Tifa Chen 陈梓童	1	"鞋子特大号" / "牛仔很忙" / "免费教学录影带"^{1}	6	"刀马旦"	11	"黑色幽默"	15,986^{3}	31^{5}	41.47	Runner-up
Na Ying	Zhang Lei 张磊	2	"梦一场" / "南山南"	7	"异乡人"	12	"旅行"	23,871^{4}	66^{5}	58.53	Winner
Wang Feng	Beibei 贝贝	3	"石头在歌唱"	8	"回来"	N/A (already eliminated)		8,033	N/A		Fourth place
Jay Chou	Leon Lee 李安	4	"发如雪"^{2}	9	"蜗牛"	N/A (already eliminated)		6,856	N/A		Fifth place
Harlem Yu	Tan Xuanyuan 谭轩辕	5	"我最摇摆"	10	"We Are the Champions" / "We Will Rock You"	N/A (already eliminated)		8,132	N/A		Third place

1. The performance featured coach Na Ying as the guest backing vocalist.
2. The performance featured fellow team members Sharon Kwan 关诗敏 and Jiang Yuandong 江源东 as the instrumentalists for Erhu and Dizi respectively.
3. Tifa Chen 陈梓童 received 8,880 votes in the first round, and accumulated 15,986 votes by the end of second round.
4. Zhang Lei 张磊 received 11,773 votes in the first round, and accumulated 23,871 votes by the end of second round.
5. Due to technical difficulties, only 97 members of the media judging panel managed to cast their votes.

Non-competition performances
Order	Performers	Song
14.1	JJ Lin & Jimmy Lin	"全面开战"
14.2	The Top 48 (Gin Lee 李幸倪, Sun Bolun 孙伯纶, Ika Zhao 赵大格, Will Jay 刘伟男, Ma Yinyin 马吟吟, Jiang Yuandong 江源东, Usay Kawlu 舞思爱·羔露, Zhang Xinxin 张鑫鑫, Sharon Kwan 关诗敏, Jóhannes Koo 古振邦, Xiu'er 修儿, Heo Chul 许哲, Vanatsaya Viseskul 朗嘎拉姆, Shuhei Nagasawa 长宇, Huang Xiaoyun 黄霄雲, Huang Yong 黄勇, Kiki Li 李嘉琪, Bek 别日克, Lotus Zhang 张姝, Su Hao 苏浩, Chenyo 晨悠, Rex Li 李文豪, Abigail Garza 李安安, Zhang Lei 张磊, Leon Lee 李安, Tifa Chen 陈梓童, Beibei 贝贝 & Tan Xuanyuan 谭轩辕)	"我爱你中国"

== Non-competition shows ==
=== The Mid-Autumn Special (27 September) ===
The twelfth episode was a two-hour special episode aired on 27 September 2015, featuring performances by the coaches and artists from the current and past seasons in celebration of the Mid-Autumn Festival. Besides paying tribute and giving thanks to artists' family members and coaches, this episode gave a special mention to the late Bella Yao, a season two artist who died on 16 January 2015. The episode was taped on 21 September 2015, at The Venetian Theatre.

Episode	Order	Performer(s)	Song
Episode 12 (27 September)	1	Jay Chou & his team (Tifa Chen 陈梓童, Leon Lee 李安, Lim Xu 徐林, Michael Liu 柳畅源, Sharon Kwan 关诗敏 & Will Jay 刘伟男)	"我要夏天"
Episode 12 (27 September)	2	Tifa Chen 陈梓童 & Michael Liu 柳畅源	"刀剑如梦"
Episode 12 (27 September)	3	Jaffri Cao 曹景豪 & Tan Xuanyuan 谭轩辕	"It's My Life"
Episode 12 (27 September)	4	Sharon Kwan 关诗敏	"晴天"
Episode 12 (27 September)	5	Will Jay 刘伟男	"Lemon Tree"
Episode 12 (27 September)	6	Ika Zhao 赵大格	"All About That Bass" / "我在人民广场吃炸鸡"
Episode 12 (27 September)	7	Beibei 贝贝 & Xiu'er 修儿	"我的天空"
Episode 12 (27 September)	8	Wang Feng	"流年啊 你奈我何"
Episode 12 (27 September)	9	Na Ying	"雾里看花"
Episode 12 (27 September)	10	Shuhei Nagasawa 长宇	"See You Again"
Episode 12 (27 September)	11	Zhao Han 赵晗 (with Ika Zhao 赵大格, Iky Loke 陆蔚綝, Jaffri Cao 曹景豪, Jóhannes Koo 古振邦, Ma Yinyin 马吟吟, Shuhei Nagasawa 长宇, Tan Xuanyuan 谭轩辕, Usay Kawlu 舞思爱·羔露 & Zhu Qiang 朱强)	"也许明天"
Episode 12 (27 September)	12	Zhu Qiang 朱强	"但愿人长久"
Episode 12 (27 September)	13	Iky Loke 陆蔚綝 & Jóhannes Koo 古振邦	"Say Something"
Episode 12 (27 September)	14	Harlem Yu	"情非得已"
Episode 12 (27 September)	15	Jay Chou, Lim Xu 徐林 & Will Jay 刘伟男	"稻香"

=== The Battle of Glory (16 October) ===
For the first time in the show's history, the Top 5 artists of the current season were pit against the team of returning artists from the previous seasons for the honour of the "Golden Team", dubbed as the "highest glory" of the show. The current season's team, named "地表最强战队", were led by Na Ying and Jay Chou; while Harlem Yu and Wang Feng took charge of the previous seasons' team, which called themselves the "回归者联盟".

There were five rounds of competition, and in each round the team coaches would send out one of their team members to compete against a team member from the opposing team. The order of appearance were decided randomly by the team coaches prior to the start of the show. At the end of each round, the studio audience made up of 600 members of the public would vote for their favourite performance among the two. With 1,478 accumulated public votes, Team Harlem & Wang Feng emerged as the winning team of the Battle of Glory, and was given the title of the "Golden Team". The episode was taped on 22 September 2015, at The Venetian Theatre.

Colour key

Artist received higher public votes than the artist(s) from the opposing team
Artist(s) received fewer public votes than the artist from the opposing team

Episode	Order	Team Harlem & Wang Feng			Team Na Ying & Jay		
Episode	Order	Song	Artist(s)	Public votes (Accumulated votes)		Artist	Song
Episode 15 (16 October)	1	"触发无限"	Yu Feng 余枫	269 (269)	272 (272)	Tifa Chen 陈梓童	"双截棍"
Episode 15 (16 October)	2	"一页爱情"	Li Qi 李琦	322 (591)	270 (542)	Leon Lee 李安	"逝去的爱"
Episode 15 (16 October)	3	"不是我不明白"	Bi Xia 毕夏	301 (892)	293 (835)	Beibei 贝贝	"花火"
Episode 15 (16 October)	4	"贝加尔湖畔"	Zhou Shen 周深 & Li Wei 李维	244 (1,136)	308 (1,143)	Zhang Lei 张磊	"南山南"
Episode 15 (16 October)	5	"无所不在"	Momo Wu 吴莫愁	342 (1,478)	240 (1,383)	Tan Xuanyuan 谭轩辕	"Still Loving You"

Other performances
Order	Performer(s)	Song
15.1	Jay Chou & Michael Liu 柳畅源	"惊叹号"
15.2	Wang Feng	"像梦一样自由"
15.3	Jay Chou & Jiang Yuandong 江源东	"青花瓷"
15.4	Wang Feng	"沧浪之歌"
15.5	Na Ying	"爱要有你才完美"
15.6	Harlem Yu	"热情的沙漠"

== Elimination chart ==
=== Overall ===
Artist's info

- Artist from Team Harlem
- Artist from Team Wang Feng
- Artist from Team Na Ying
- Artist from Team Jay

Result details

- Winner
- Runner-up
- Third place
- Fourth place
- Fifth place
- Artist was saved by the media judging panel / received the highest accumulated total points and advanced to the finals
- Artist was saved by coach and won the "coach's save" round
- Artist was saved by coach but lost the "coach's save" round
- Artist was eliminated
- Artist did not perform

Artist	Week 1	Week 2	Week 3	Finals
Zhang Lei 张磊	Safe		Safe (1st)	Winner
Tifa Chen 陈梓童	Safe		Safe (2nd)	Runner-up
Tan Xuanyuan 谭轩辕		Safe	Safe (3rd)	Third place
Beibei 贝贝		Safe	Safe (5th)	Fourth place
Leon Lee 李安	Safe		Safe (4th)	Fifth place
Sun Bolun 孙伯纶	Safe		Eliminated (6th)	Eliminated (Week 3)
Ika Zhao 赵大格		Safe	Eliminated (7th)	Eliminated (Week 3)
Lotus Zhang 张姝		Safe	Eliminated (8th)	Eliminated (Week 3)
Gin Lee 李幸倪	Safe		Eliminated (9th)	Eliminated (Week 3)
Huang Yong 黄勇		Safe	Eliminated (10th)	Eliminated (Week 3)
Ma Yinyin 马吟吟		Eliminated	Eliminated (Week 2)	
Huang Xiaoyun 黄霄雲		Eliminated	Eliminated (Week 2)	
Zhang Xinxin 张鑫鑫		Eliminated	Eliminated (Week 2)	
Sharon Kwan 关诗敏	Eliminated	Eliminated (Week 1)		
Shuhei Nagasawa 长宇	Eliminated	Eliminated (Week 1)		
Vanatsaya Viseskul 朗嘎拉姆	Eliminated	Eliminated (Week 1)		

=== Team ===
Artist's info

- Artist from Team Harlem
- Artist from Team Wang Feng
- Artist from Team Na Ying
- Artist from Team Jay

Result details

- Winner
- Runner-up
- Third place
- Fourth place
- Fifth place
- Artist was saved by coach and won the "coach's save" round
- Artist was saved by coach but lost the "coach's save" round
- Artist was eliminated
- Artist did not perform

Artist	Week 1	Week 2	Week 3	Finals
Tan Xuanyuan 谭轩辕		Advanced	Advanced (3rd)	Third place
Ika Zhao 赵大格		Advanced	Eliminated (7th)	
Lotus Zhang 张姝		Advanced	Eliminated (8th)	
Ma Yinyin 马吟吟		Eliminated		
Beibei 贝贝		Advanced	Advanced (5th)	Fourth place
Huang Yong 黄勇		Advanced	Eliminated (10th)	
Huang Xiaoyun 黄霄雲		Eliminated		
Zhang Xinxin 张鑫鑫		Eliminated		
Zhang Lei 张磊	Advanced		Advanced (1st)	Winner
Sun Bolun 孙伯纶	Advanced		Eliminated (6th)	
Shuhei Nagasawa 长宇	Eliminated			
Vanatsaya Viseskul 朗嘎拉姆	Eliminated			
Tifa Chen 陈梓童	Advanced		Advanced (2nd)	Runner-up
Leon Lee 李安	Advanced		Advanced (4th)	Fifth place
Gin Lee 李幸倪	Advanced		Eliminated (9th)	
Sharon Kwan 关诗敏	Eliminated			

== Artists' appearances on earlier seasons or other talent shows ==
- Tifa Chen appeared on the fourth season of Super Girl as one of the top 300 finalists.
- Zhu Qiang sang in the blind auditions for season three, but failed to turn any chairs.
- Beibei (then under the name of Li Zoujun) and Yang Baoxin were contestants on the second season of Chinese Idol. Both passed the auditions, but failed to be selected by the judges to join the group of top 65 contestants for the next round of the competition and were eliminated. Beibei also participated in season two, but failed to turn any chairs. Her performance was not broadcast on television.
- Lim Xu participated in the second season of Super Boy and emerged as one of the top 61 finalists. Xu then appeared on You Are the Music and was one of the top 6 finalists.
- Leon Lee was a contestant on the seventh season of Australia's Got Talent, where he was eliminated in the semifinal.
- Saya Chang was the winner of the fifth season of I'm Not a Star.
- Sun Bolun (then under the name of Gary Sun Xiaoliang) and Usay Kawlu appeared on the seventh season of One Million Star, and finished in second and third place respectively. Sun also participated in the first season of Super Boy (also under the stage name of Sun Xiaoliang) and finished in sixth place of the Xi'an division. He later joined the Asian Wave and finished as one of the top 6 contestants.
- Sharon Kwan was a contestant on the first season of Chinese Million Star, and went on to become the first ever winner of the show.
- Ginny Kuo from Chenyo was a contestant on the fourth season of Super Idol, where she was eliminated in the Top 17.
- Leonala Ling sang in the blind auditions for season two, but failed to turn any chairs. Her performance was not broadcast on television.

== Ratings ==
=== CSM50 ratings ===
Episode		Original airdate	Production	Time slot (UTC+8)	Rating	Share	Ranking	Source
1	"The Blind Auditions Premiere"	17 July 2015	401	Friday 9:10 p.m.	5.308	16.35	1	
2	"The Blind Auditions, Part 2"	24 July 2015	402	Friday 9:10 p.m.	5.455	17.12	1	
3	"The Blind Auditions, Part 3"	31 July 2015	403	Friday 9:10 p.m.	5.181	16.45	1	
4	"The Blind Auditions, Part 4"	7 August 2015	404	Friday 9:10 p.m.	5.363	16.80	1	
5	"The Blind Auditions, Part 5"	14 August 2015	405	Friday 9:10 p.m.	5.137	16.22	1	
6	"The Battles and The Knockouts, Part 1"	21 August 2015	406	Friday 9:10 p.m.	4.962	15.72	1	
7	"The Battles and The Knockouts, Part 2"	28 August 2015	407	Friday 9:10 p.m.	4.960	15.62	1	
8	"The Battles and The Knockouts, Part 3"	6 September 2015	408	Sunday 9:10 p.m.	3.758	12.57	1	
9	"The Battles and The Knockouts, Part 4"	11 September 2015	409	Friday 9:10 p.m.	3.977	13.00	1	
10	"The Cross Battles, Part 1"	18 September 2015	410	Friday 9:10 p.m.	4.541	14.77	1	
11	"The Cross Battles, Part 2"	25 September 2015	411	Friday 9:10 p.m.	4.323	14.21	1	
12	"The Mid-Autumn Special"	27 September 2015	412	Sunday 9:10 p.m.	1.577	5.20	3	
13	"The Top 10 Playoffs"	30 September 2015	413	Wednesday 9:10 p.m.	3.478	11.92	1	
14	"The Live Finals, Round 1"	7 October 2015	414	Wednesday 8:00 p.m.	6.417	17.72	2	
14	"The Live Finals, Round 2"	7 October 2015	414	Wednesday 8:00 p.m.	6.800	27.36	1	
15	"The Battle of Glory"	16 October 2015	415	Friday 9:10 p.m.	2.108	6.97	2	
