= Mao Buyi =

Chinese singer-songwriter (born 1994)

Mao Buyi 毛不易
- Born: 王维家; Wang Weijia; 1 October 1994 (age 31); Tailai, Heilongjiang, China
- Occupations: Singer, songwriter
- Instruments: Vocals, guitar
- Years active: 2017–present
- Education: Hangzhou Normal University

Mao Buyi (Chinese: 毛不易; pinyin: Máo Bùyì; born October 1, 1994; birth name Wang Weijia; 王维家) is a Chinese singer and songwriter. Mao rose to prominence for winning the all-male singing competition The Coming One (明日之子) in 2017. Mao is a self-taught pop artist known for works depicting the subtle nuances of everyday life. He has released four studio albums to which he authored all lyrics and compositions. Mao's discography also includes over a dozen theme songs from original soundtracks for television dramas, movies, and video games.

== Early life and education ==
Mao is a native of Tailai County, Qiqihar, in the Heilongjiang province of Northeast China. He pursued a degree in nursing at Hangzhou Normal University and undertook an internship at a hospital in Hangzhou in 2016 during his last year in university. In the same year, he started songwriting to alleviate work-related stress. He learned to play the guitar, and wrote a few songs informally before appearing on The Coming One.

Throughout his nursing career, Mao frequently faced situations involving deceased patients. The first personal experience of death he encountered was the passing of his mother. In tribute to her memory, Mao maintained a practice of sending messages to her WeChat account after her death.

== Career ==
=== 2017-2019: Debut and Perfect Day ===
In 2017, Mao gained recognition as a contestant on the Tencent Video singing competition "The Coming One" (明日之子). His appearance, characterized by "round faces, large glasses, and some slightly crooked teeth", contrasted with the more elaborate costumes and makeup of his fellow contestants. Mao's lack of extensive performing experience and awkward demeanor set him apart, which his fans found endearing. His musical repertoire, diverging from traditional themes of romance, focused on topics like hopelessness, frustrated ambition, and aspirations for financial success. He won the competition on September 23, 2017, and his song "Drink Sorrow Down" (Chinese: 消愁; pinyin: Xiaochou) that debuted during the competition stayed at the top of the QQ Music chart for 11 days and was played over 500 million times. From November 2017 to April 2018, Mao, along with other contestants from the show, was part of "The Coming One National Tour" (明日之子全国巡回演唱会).

In 2018, Mao won the New Music Power Award of Weibo Awards Ceremony on January 18. On May 31, Mao released his debut album, Perfect Day (平凡的一天), produced by singer and songwriter Li Jian. The lead single, "Perfect Day", hit one million downloads and streams on the first day of its release. The album was acclaimed by critics for its natural, warm lyrics and "melancholy melodies". On August 29, Mao won the Chinese Song Music festival's most popular new artist of the year award and best new artist of the year award, while the song "Drink Sorrow Down" won the golden song of the year award. On November 29, Mao won the Most Promising Male Singer Award and the Best Singer-Songwriter of the Year Award at the Asian Music Awards. In the same year, Mao embarked on his first solo concert tour, "Someone Like Me National Solo Concert Tour" (像我这样的人个人全国巡回演唱会) from September 22 to November 17.

In 2019, Billboard China launched the Billboard China Top 100, which is compiled based on radio play, streaming, and digital sales in mainland China. Mao stayed number one during five weeks of 2019 with his 2017 songs "Someone Like Me" (像我这样的人) and "Drink Sorrow Down".

=== 2020-2023: Xiao Wang and Lonely Planet ===
In January 2020, Mao participated in Hunan TV's music competition program Singer as a debut singer. On January 22, Mao released his second music album, Xiao Wang (小王). In August, Mao ranked 79th on Forbes China Celebrity 100 list. In December, Mao performed in the CCTV New Year's Gala "Sailing 2021" and the "2020 Most Beautiful Night bilibili Gala", jointly presented by CCTV and Bilibili.

In 2021, Mao released his third album Lonely Planet (幼鸟指南), produced by Arai Soichiro, on June 26. It ranked first on TME Physical Album Sales Chart's January 2022 monthly chart. On July 16 and 23, Mao appeared in the lifestyle reality show "Back To Field" for the fourth time and sang "In This Mountain", a track from the album Lonely Planet, at the concert of the final episode of season 5. On December 14, Mao released a theme song for the movie "I Am What I Am", "Nobody" (无名的人).

In 2023, Mao embarked on his second concert tour "Lonely Planet Solo National Concert Tour" (幼鸟指南个人全国巡回演唱会) with stops in nine cities and marking the first time Mao performed in venues that can seat more than 10,000 attendees. The tour kicked off in Hangzhou, where Mao started his music career as a nursing student.

=== 2024: The Inner Venture ===
On August 9, Mao announced on his personal Weibo that his fourth album, The Inner Venture (冒险精神) was coming soon with the lead single "The Inner Venture" being released online on August 16. This album was released on September 23, 2024.

== Artistry ==
=== Style and lyricism ===
Mao has been likened to the younger Li Zongsheng and the "Chinese version of Bob Dylan". His lyricism is noted for its blend of parallelism and simplicity. Listeners believe that his songs capture a certain sentiment of the era, some comments refer to him as a "voice of the youth," while others call him the "spokesperson for the ordinary people". His works often shed lights to everyday life events, exploring the subtleties of human emotions. In "Mom's Cooking", he reminiscently chanted about the little dining table and mom's cooking, in memory of his late mother who died with terminal cancer. As a fourth-year nursing intern at university, he penned the song "If One Day I Became Rich" in his modest rental apartment, as a response to the financial struggles he was facing at the time.

=== Reception ===
Different from the typical pop star, Mao considered himself an "ordinary individual" leading an unremarkable life. During his school years, he did not excel academically and lacked a specific ambition, preferring to enjoy a carefree childhood. He adopted the name "Buyi" (不易) as a teenager, translated to "not easily changed". He noted later that he wished to hold true to authenticity and simplicity. Although he was referred to as a "music genius" by senior songwriters Li Jian and Pu Shu, he attributes the supposed talents to his small-town upbringing and his laid-back lifestyle. He expressed a desire to withdraw from the public eye and be "forgotten" if his musical abilities ever diminished.

== Discography ==
=== Albums ===
- Perfect Day 平凡的一天 (2018)
- Xiao Wang 小王 (2020)
- Lonely Planet 幼鸟指南 (2021)
- The Inner Venture 冒险精神 (2024)

=== OST ===
Year	Title	Singer	Series	Notes	Ref.
2021	As Dreams Awaken	Mao Buyi	New Generation	Ending Theme	
2025	Serenade	Mao Buyi	The First Frost	Healing Song	

== Concert tours ==
=== 2017-2018 The Coming One National Tour ===
Year	Date	City	Venue	Ref.
2017	November 3	Nanjing	Wutaishan Sports Center Arena	
2017	December 2	Beijing	Capital Indoor Stadium Arena	
2017	December 9	Hangzhou	Huanglong Sports Center Arena	
2018	January 5	Chongqing	Chongqing People's Auditorium	
2018	January 20	Luoyang	Luoyang New District Sports Center Arena	
2018	April 8	Shenzhen	Shenzhen Bay Sports Center Arena	

=== 2018 Someone Like Me National Solo Concert Tour ===
Date	City	Venue	Special Guest	Ref.
September 22	Shanghai	National Exhibition and Convention Center (Shanghai)		
October 13	Beijing	Workers Indoor Arena	Wu Qing-feng	
November 17	Chengdu	Chengdu Financial City Performing Arts Center	Good Meimei	

=== 2023 Lonely Planet Solo National Concert Tour ===
Date	City	Venue	Special Guest	Ref.
March 25	Hangzhou	Hangzhou Olympic Sports Center Arena		
April 1	Shenzhen	Shenzhen Bay Sports Center Arena		
April 8	Suzhou	Suzhou Olympic Sports Centre Arena		
April 22	Chengdu	Phoenix Hill Sports Park Arena		
May 20	Changsha	Hunan International Conference & Exhibition Center		
May 27	Shanghai	Mercedes-Benz Arena (Shanghai)		
July 15	Ningbo	Ningbo Olympic Sports Center Arena		
July 22	Wuhan	Wuhan Sports Center Arena		
July 29	Beijing	Wukesong Arena	Rene Liu	
September 15	Beijing	National Indoor Stadium	Li Jian	

=== 2024–2025 The Inner Venture National Concert Tour ===
Year	Date	City	Venue	Special Guest	Ref.
2024	December 7	Chengdu	Phoenix Hill Sports Park Arena		
2024	December 21	Guangzhou	Guangzhou Baoneng International Sports Arena		
2025	February 15	Suzhou	Suzhou Olympic Sports Centre Arena		
2025	March 1	Shenzhen	Shenzhen Universiade Sports Centre Arena		
2025	March 8	Xiamen	Xiamen Sports Center Phoenix Arena		
2025	March 14	Shanghai	Mercedes-Benz Arena (Shanghai)		
2025	March 15	Shanghai	Mercedes-Benz Arena (Shanghai)		
2025	March 22	Qingdao	Qingdao Citizen Fitness Center Arena		
2025	March 29	Xi'an	Xi'an Olympic Sports Center Arena		
2025	April 13	Tianjin	Tianjin Olympic Center Arena		
2025	April 19	Harbin	Harbin International Conference Exhibition and Sports Center Arena		
2025	May 10	Ningbo	Ningbo Olympic Sports Center Arena	Wang Sulong	
2025	May 17	Wuhan	Wuhan Optics Valley International Tennis Center		
2025	May 24	Zhengzhou	Zhengzhou Olympic Sports Center Arena		
2025	June 1	Hangzhou	Hangzhou Olympic Sports Center Arena		
2025	June 14	Nanchang	Nanchang International Sports Center Arena		
2025	June 21	Hefei	Hefei Shaoquan Sports Center Arena		
2025	June 28	Chongqing	Huaxi LIVE·Yudong Arena		
2025	July 5	Taiyuan	Shanxi Sports Centre Arena		
2025	July 19	Nanjing	Nanjing Youth Olympic Sports Park Gymnasium		
2025	July 26	Beijing	National Indoor Stadium	Xu Jiaying	
2025	July 27	Beijing	National Indoor Stadium		

== Philanthropy ==
On September 11, 2018, Mao attended the 6th season of the Charity Stars-To Dream Designer ceremony and Luohu Fashion Night as a public welfare ambassador. At the event, he hand-painted an "art dream bag" with Han Geng and Shen Mengchen to raise awareness about children's art education in economically disadvantaged regions. On November 2, Mao received an invitation to serve as the "EU-China Tourism Year Ambassador".

On May 5, 2020, Mao took part in the "Believe in the Future" charity show, where he performed "Perfect Day"(平凡的一天).

In July 2021, Mao participated in CCTV's "Together with You" charity show and sang "Perfect Day"(平凡的一天) in tribute to the heroes among ordinary people.

In July 2021, Mao donated 500,000 RMB to the flood-stricken areas in Henan Province.
