= Saverio Principini =

American songwriter

Saverio "Sage" Principini
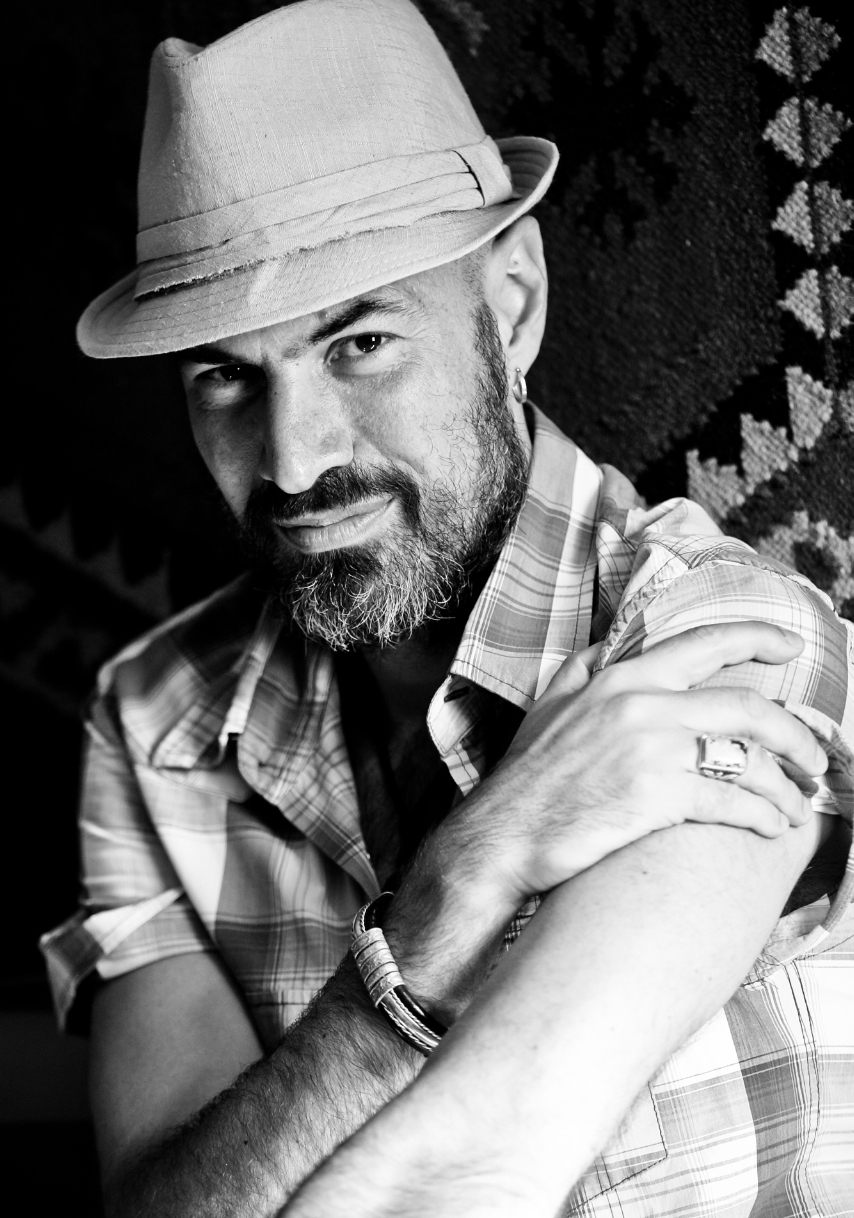
- Saverio Principini
- Occupations: Record producer, songwriter
- Website: www.saverioprincipini.com

Saverio Principini (also known as "Sage") is a certified multi-platinum music producer and songwriter active in the Los Angeles music scene since 1987.

== Early life and career ==
Sage began his musical career in Italy as a bassist for cult heavy metal band, Astaroth. At age 16, he recorded his first record, The Long Loud Silence, for Dutch label, Rave-On Records, and toured extensively throughout Europe with the band.

In 1991, Sage began collaborating with Italian singer-songwriter, Vasco Rossi, casting session musicians for ongoing recording sessions. Sage's castings and executive productions soon became widely acclaimed in the Italian music scene, as they featured world-renowned musicians such as Vinnie Colaiuta, Michael Landau, Randy Jackson, Greg Bissonette, Neil Stubenhaus, Michael Thompson, and many more. Also spotlighted in Sage's productions were musical legends, Slash, and Steve Vai. Throughout the '90s, Sage remained extremely active musically, producing sessions at A&M Studios, Record Plant Studios, and Capitol Studios by day, and performing with his band, WORD, by night.

WORD's crossover funk rock style piqued the interest of music supervisor, David Ari Leon, who consequently implemented WORD's music in the TV series of 1994, Valley of the Dolls. WORD eventually landed a deal with Virgin Records Italy, and a tour with singer, Alberto Fortis, soon followed. WORD and Fortis collaborated on one studio album, Dentro Il Giardino, which culminated in a televised concert performed live on MTV.

During the late 1990s, Sage founded Sage Studio in Sherman Oaks, CA, where he composed a fresh catalog of original music, as well as music for Fox Family. Amid this time, he also produced sessions for a diverse range of artists including Adriano Celentano, Diego Torres, Divididos, and Myriam Hernández, and co-wrote with the entirety of Desmond Child's publishing company, Deston Songs. Especially significant from this period is the co-production Sage lent to Laura Pausini's Grammy-winning album, Yo Canto.

Shortly thereafter, Sage opened Speakeasy Studios in the Hollywood Hills, where both American and international artists such as Ricky Martin, Janelle Monae, Kevin Bacon, Elisa, Negrita, Doyle Bramhall II, Amaia Montero, Tiromancino, The Lonely Island, Club Dogo and Vasco Rossi, among many others, have written and recorded.

Since 2022 Sage left the Speakeasy Studios to open a new recording studio in Atwater Village as part of the audio visual award winning company Echobend Pictures where he continues to compose and write songs.

== Musical Stylings ==
Sage's songwriting encompasses mainly rock, pop, soul, and world musicality. He has also collaborated with Canadian artist, Gino Vannelli, co-writing the song "Canto" on a crossover opera album for BMG.

Operating since 1991, Sage Studio INC has also functioned as an executive production firm connecting many European and South American musicians – namely, Eros Ramazzotti, Diego Torres, Myriam Hernández, Adriano Celentano, Divididos, Tiziano Ferro, and Jovanotti.

== Television and film ==
Sage composes frequently for both television and film. In 2009, he co-wrote the title track for Sony's The Lodger (starring Alfred Molina) with composer John Frizzel, featuring vocals by classical singer, Sasha Lazard. Sage's music was likewise featured in NBC's Surrender Dorothy (Diane Keaton), and Marvel's Dr. Strange. Sage also provided music for The Oprah Winfrey Show, The Dr. Oz Show, and subsequently produced music for the CW network show The Search for the Next Doll for the band The Pussycat Dolls. In 2011, Sage composed additional music for the documentary film, Beats, Rhymes & Life: The Travels of a Tribe Called Quest. Beyond the United States, Sage's music can be heard in Italy's most-watched TV series, I Cesaroni, as well as in other shows such as Un medico in famiglia, and the 1994 series, Valley of the Dolls.

The song "I soliti", co-written with Vasco Rossi, was featured in the closing scene and credits of the film, Questa storia qua, which was presented as a special selection at the 2010 Venice International Film Festival. "I soliti" was also number one for two consecutive weeks on F.I.M.I.'s singles charts. Sage also scored music for the documentary films Una su tre and Get Together Girls. His co-wrote Gli Sbagli Che Fai for singer Vasco Rossi which in 2024 was featured as the theme music for the Netflix show Il Supervissuto.

== Musical Partnerships ==
Sage has produced prominent duets featuring Cristina Scabbia of Lacuna Coil alongside Italian music icon Franco Battiato, and also Leona Lewis with Biagio Antonacci. Both duets debuted at the top of the charts in Italy. Sage wrote and produced music with crossover Opera soprano Filippa Giordano for Sony Mexico as well.

Along with engineer Michael Tacci, Sage produced The Tigers, an LA indie band appearing on Thrive Records' compilation His Hers by Amanda Scheer, which spotlighted such talents as Oasis, Daft Punk, and Ryan Adams.

Sage has also worked with many international producers including Humberto Gatica, Patrick Leonard, Geoff Westley, Joe Vannelli, Celso Valli, Lee Curreri, and more recently, Joe Chiccarelli, and Claudio Guidetti. Sage has also conducted international musical collaborations with John Shanks, Wyclef Jean, and Sergio Mendez.

Sage in his career also focused on the discovery, development and production of many indie artists including Amana Melomé, Jameson Burt, Chris Wood, Neila Dar and many others.

== Recent years ==
In 2011, Sage had entered a worldwide publishing deal with EMI Music. Sage has also acted as the musical director of Hit Week, a two-week live event in New York City and Los Angeles that showcased notable Italian musicians in the United States.

In recent years, five of Sage's and Rossi's songs, "I soliti," "Sto pensado a te," "Manifesto futurista della nuova umanitá", "Cambia-menti" and "Come Nelle Favole " went No. 1 in Italy, all achieving multi-platinum status. Further, a selection of songs that Sage co-wrote with Rossi are all-time Top 10 in sales for Rossi on iTunes and he has a total of 14 published songs with Vasco Rossi including XI Comandamento, Gli Sbagli Che Fai, Patto Con Riscatto, Una Canzone D'Amore Buttata Via, L'Amore Ai Tempi Del Cellulare, Prendiamo Il Volo, Un Respiro In Piu, Marta Piange Ancora and Lo Vedi.

Sage also owned Savana Records in Los Angeles, an indie label originally distributed by Whole Foods that focused on the promotion of less exposed music. Several recordings are currently active under Savana, including neo-soul / reggae singer, Amana Melome, guitarist Fabio Mittino (with the recordings of music of G.I.Gurdjieff-T. DeHartmann) and an eclectic project called SOUP together with drummer Vinnie Colaiuta and guitarist Marcello Cosenza and guests John Beasley, Chad Fischer, Simone Sello and Alex Alessandroni, Jr.

In 2012, Sage reunited his original band, Astaroth, and produced a full-length album entitled The End of Silence. Sage also collaborated at Speakeasy Studios with The Lonely Island, a project by Saturday Night Live comics Andy Samberg, Akiva Schaffer, and Jorma Taccone co-writing/producing Dramatic Intro which is the opening song of their CD The Wack Album.

In 2007, Sage launched with UK DJ Bill Davies Rootdown Radio, a commercial-free, internet radio station which reached tremendous success in the groove underground music world but was eventually closed in 2015 due to excessive maintenance costs and luck of revenue. He also co-founded the web-based production company sessionrecording.com, which offered international collaboration to independent productions with budget restrictions.

In 2014, Sage arranged and played on Dannate Nuvole, yet another hit song for singer Vasco Rossi. He also mixed Juan Darthes' album "Ahora" for Warner Music Argentina. In the same year he also produced the debut album for the winner of The Voice (Italian Version of the talent show) "Sister Cristina" and songs for the album "Sono Innocente" of "Vasco Rossi" which reached number one in the Italian Charts and 7 times platinum status.

In 2015, Sage was the executive producer on Eros Ramazzotti's 13th Studio Album called "Perfetto". He also recorded the drum tracks and played bass on "Alejandra Guzman" A + No Poder.

In 2016, Vasco Rossi released a compilation called "Vasco Non Stop" that included several songs he had co-written with Sage, including four new songs two of which Sage co-wrote and one he produced and mixed at their LA facility Speakeasy Studios.

Sage in 2017 entered a worldwide publishing contract with Star SRL in Italy /Downtown Music Group in the US.

After the 2020 pandemic and a year sabbatical Sage returned to composing and songwriting, focusing primarily in Film and TV work.

Sage is a voting member of the National Academy of Recording Arts and Science (NARAS) and the Latin Academy of Recording Arts and Sciences (LARAS). He currently resides in Los Angeles, California.
