= The Voice of China season 3 =

The Voice of China
- Season 3
- Hosted by: Hu Qiaohua
- Judges: Chyi Chin; Wang Feng; Na Ying; Yang Kun
- Winner: Zhang Bichen 张碧晨
- Winning coach: Na Ying
- Runner-up: Perhat Khaliq 帕尔哈提
- Finals venue: Capital Indoor Stadium

Release
- Original network: ZRTG: Zhejiang Television
- Original release: 18 July – 7 October 2014

Season chronology
- ← Previous; Season 2 Next → Season 4

The third season of the Chinese reality talent show The Voice of China premiered on 18 July 2014 on Zhejiang Television. Hu Qiaohua returned as host. Na Ying and Wang Feng returned as coaches. A-mei and Harlem Yu did not return for season three, making room for the return of Yang Kun after a one-season absence, and an addition of a new coach, Chyi Chin. On 7 October 2014, Zhang Bichen of Team Na Ying was announced as the winner of the season, making her the first female winner of The Voice of China and Coach Na Ying second win as coach. Perhat Khaliq of Team Wang Feng, Ryan Yu of Team Yang Kun, and UZ Qin of Team Chyi Chin finished runner-up, third, and fourth places respectively.

== Changes from the previous seasons ==
This year's Blind Auditions were filmed outside Shanghai, where the two previous seasons were recorded. The number of members on each coach's team was increased to 16 from 14 in previous seasons. In addition, the "Steal" option introduced in Season 2 was removed from the Battle Rounds format.

One major change this year is that the show also allowed entries from street auditions in more than 100 cities in China. Several entries from street auditions passed through pre-show eliminations and made their way to the Blind Auditions.

== Teams ==
Colour key

- Winner
- Runner-up
- Third place
- Fourth place
- Eliminated in the Playoffs (round 2)
- Eliminated in the Playoffs (round 1)
- Eliminated in the Knockout rounds
- Eliminated in the Battle rounds

| Coaches | Top 64 artists | | | |
|---|---|---|---|---|
| Chyi Chin | | | | |
| Chyi Chin | UZ Qin 秦宇子 | Wei Ran 魏然 | Liu Shuangshuang 刘双双 | Zhang Zhuo Hanwei 张卓含威 |
| Chyi Chin | Cheng Shin-ci 郑心慈 | Lina Lou 楼沁 | Nanma Ziga 南玛子呷 | Shen Yulin 申钰林 |
| Chyi Chin | Bai Mu 白穆 | Cui Xi 崔西 | Li Man 李蔓 | Li Wa 莉娃 |
| Chyi Chin | Li Zhixian 李致贤 | Liu Zhijia 刘至佳 | Luo Jingwen 罗景文 | Wendy Woo 胡慧仪 |
| Wang Feng | | | | |
| Wang Feng | Perhat Khaliq 帕尔哈提 | Wang Kaiqi 王凯琪 | Geng Sihan 耿斯汉 | Li Qi 李琪 |
| Wang Feng | Mark Chang 张心杰 | Mo Yanlin 莫艳琳 | You Mei 由美 | Yu Bo 于勃 |
| Wang Feng | Chen Xin 陈昕 | Chen Zhi 陈直 | Rocky Chan 陈乐基 | Shi Yufan 石宇凡 |
| Wang Feng | Wang Zhuo 王卓 | Zhang Dandan 张丹丹 | Zhang Jingyi 张婧懿 | Zhao Qi 赵祺 |
| Na Ying | | | | |
| Na Ying | Zhang Bichen 张碧晨 | Chen Bing 陈冰 | Li Jiage 李嘉格 | Rose Liu 刘明湘 |
| Na Ying | Li Wei 李维 | Liu Chenxi 刘辰希 | Xia Heng 夏恒 | Zhang Jiang 张江 |
| Na Ying | Cui Zhonghua 崔忠华 | Eve Ai 艾怡良 | Mao Zeshao 毛泽少 | Tu Hongjiang 吐洪江 |
| Na Ying | Wei Xueman 魏雪漫 | Zhang Zhiyong 张智勇 | Zheng Junshu 郑俊树 | Zhou Shen 周深 |
| Yang Kun | | | | |
| Yang Kun | Ryan Yu 余枫 | Melody Tan 陈永馨 | Li Wenqi 李文琦 | Xu Jianqiu 徐剑秋 |
| Yang Kun | Maggie Mo 莫海婧 | Robynn & Kendy | Rong Qi 戎琦 | Su Qifan 苏琪繁 |
| Yang Kun | Apple Garden 苹果园 | Ekram 伊克拉木 | Kai Kai 开开 | Liang Dongjiang 梁栋江 |
| Yang Kun | Liu Ke 刘珂 | Qin Xiaolin 秦晓林 | Tang Siu Hau 邓小巧 | Zhao Ke 赵钶 |

== Blind auditions ==
Colour key

| ✔ | Coach hit his/her "I WANT YOU" button |
| | Artist defaulted to this coach's team |
| | Artist elected to join this coach's team |
| | Artist eliminated with no coach pressing his or her "I WANT YOU" button |

=== Episode 1 (18 July) ===
| Order | Artist | Age | Hometown | Song | Coach's and contestant's choices | | | |
| Order | Artist | Age | Hometown | Song | Chin | Feng | Ying | Kun |
|---|---|---|---|---|---|---|---|---|
| 1 | Liu Zhijia 刘至佳 | 19 | Chongqing | "Girl on Fire" | ✔ | ✔ | — | ✔ |
| 2 | Cui Zhonghua 崔忠华 | 34 | Dandong, Liaoning | "听说爱情回来过" | ✔ | — | ✔ | ✔ |
| 3 | Mao Zeshao 毛泽少 | 30 | Shenyang, Liaoning | "下个路口见" | — | — | ✔ | — |
| 4 | Melody Tan 陈永馨 | 21 | Malaysia | "你不知道的事" | ✔ | ✔ | ✔ | ✔ |
| 5 | Chen Zhi 陈直 | 28 | Chengdu, Sichuan | "私奔" | ✔ | ✔ | — | — |
| 6 | Luo Jingwen 罗景文 | 21 | Changde, Hunan | "Blue Suede Shoes" / "看见什么吃什么" | ✔ | ✔ | ✔ | ✔ |
| 7 | Lina Lou 楼沁 | 21 | Shanghai | "咕叽咕叽" | ✔ | — | ✔ | ✔ |
| 8 | Tu Hongjiang 吐洪江 | 29 | Korla, Xinjiang | "绒花" | — | — | ✔ | — |
| 9 | Zheng Junshu 郑俊树 | 20 | Dalian, Liaoning | "You Raise Me Up" | ✔ | ✔ | ✔ | — |

=== Episode 2 (25 July) ===
| Order | Artist | Age | Hometown | Song | Coach's and contestant's choices | | | |
| Order | Artist | Age | Hometown | Song | Chin | Feng | Ying | Kun |
|---|---|---|---|---|---|---|---|---|
| 1 | Qin Xiaolin 秦晓林 | 19 | Anyang, Henan | "火" | ✔ | ✔ | — | ✔ |
| 2 | Zhou Shen 周深 | 21 | Guiyang, Guizhou | "欢颜" | ✔ | — | ✔ | ✔ |
| 3 | Cheng Shin-ci 郑心慈 | 16 | New Taipei City, Taiwan | "火柴天堂" | ✔ | — | — | ✔ |
| 4 | Zhao Ke 赵钶 | 22 | Xi'an, Shaanxi | "我等到花儿也谢了" | ✔ | — | ✔ | ✔ |
| 5 | Zhang Bichen 张碧晨 | 25 | Tianjin | "她说" | ✔ | ✔ | ✔ | ✔ |
| 6 | Shen Yulin 申钰林 | 32 | Zibo, Shandong | "这一次我决不放手" | ✔ | — | — | — |
| 7 | Zhang Dandan 张丹丹 | 30 | Yangzhou, Jiangsu | "爱是一颗幸福的子弹" | ✔ | ✔ | ✔ | — |
| 8 | Robynn & Kendy (Robynn Yip 叶晴晴 & Kendy Suen 孙晓慧) | 28 | Hong Kong | "思念是一种病"/ "Where Is the Love?" | ✔ | — | ✔ | ✔ |
| 9 | Mark Chang 张心杰 | 27 | Taoyuan, Taiwan | "大惊小怪" | ✔ | ✔ | — | ✔ |

=== Episode 3 (1 August) ===
| Order | Artist | Age | Hometown | Song | Coach's and contestant's choices | | | |
| Order | Artist | Age | Hometown | Song | Chin | Feng | Ying | Kun |
|---|---|---|---|---|---|---|---|---|
| 1 | Chen Bing 陈冰 | 24 | Beijing | "盛夏光年" | ✔ | ✔ | ✔ | ✔ |
| 2 | Kai Kai 开开 | 26 | Xiamen, Fujian | "你要的爱" | ✔ | ✔ | ✔ | ✔ |
| 3 | Rocky Chan 陈乐基 | 29 | Hong Kong | "月半小夜曲" | ✔ | ✔ | ✔ | ✔ |
| 4 | Liang Dongjiang 梁栋江 | 22 | Qiqihar, Heilongjiang | "光芒" | — | — | — | — |
| 5 | Geng Sihan 耿斯汉 | 21 | Xuzhou, Jiangsu | "美丽世界的孤儿" | ✔ | ✔ | ✔ | ✔ |
| 6 | Li Qi 李琪 | 24 | Luoyang, Henan | "爱我别走" | ✔ | ✔ | ✔ | ✔ |
| 7 | Zhao Qi 赵祺 | 40 | Chengdu, Sichuan | "You Are So Beautiful" | — | ✔ | ✔ | — |
| 8 | Liu Ke 刘珂 | 20 | Nanchang, Jiangxi | "我知道你很难过" | ✔ | — | ✔ | ✔ |
| 9 | Perhat Khaliq 帕尔哈提 | 32 | Urumqi, Xinjiang | "你怎么舍得我难过" | — | ✔ | ✔ | ✔ |

=== Episode 4 (8 August) ===
| Order | Artist | Age | Hometown | Song | Coach's and contestant's choices | | | |
| Order | Artist | Age | Hometown | Song | Chin | Feng | Ying | Kun |
|---|---|---|---|---|---|---|---|---|
| 1 | Rong Qi 戎琦 | 29 | Baoding, Hebei | "离开地球表面" | ✔ | — | — | ✔ |
| 2 | Liu Chenxi 刘辰希 | 26 | Wuhan, Hubei | "忘不了" | — | — | ✔ | — |
| 3 | Zhang Zhiyong 张智勇 | 35 | Yiyang, Hunan | "火" | — | — | ✔ | — |
| 4 | Wang Zhuo 王卓 | 36 | Dalian, Liaoning | "老男孩" | — | ✔ | — | — |
| 5 | Shi Yufan 石宇凡 | 25 | Wuhan, Hubei | "风筝" | — | ✔ | — | — |
| 6 | UZ Qin 秦宇子 | 26 | United States | "I Love Rock 'n' Roll" | ✔ | — | — | ✔ |
| 7 | Li Wei 李维 | 27 | Urumqi, Xinjiang | "一江水" | ✔ | ✔ | ✔ | ✔ |
| 8 | Xu Jianqiu 徐剑秋 | 21 | Tianjin | "我好想你" | ✔ | — | — | ✔ |
| 9 | Li Wenqi 李文琦 | 16 | Beijing | "新长征路上的摇滚" | — | — | — | — |
| 10 | Li Zhixian 李致贤 | 25 | Wuhan, Hubei | "我最亲爱的" | ✔ | — | ✔ | — |
| 11 | Wendy Woo 胡慧仪 | 21 | Malaysia | "落叶归根" | ✔ | ✔ | — | ✔ |
| 12 | Su Qifan 苏琪繁 | 21 | Luzhou, Sichuan | "会痛的石头" | — | — | — | ✔ |
| 13 | Wang Kaiqi 王凯琪 | 21 | Liangshan, Sichuan | "过不去" | ✔ | ✔ | — | ✔ |
| 14 | Nanma Ziga 南玛子呷 | 32 | Liangshan, Sichuan | "一朵云" | ✔ | ✔ | ✔ | — |
| 15 | Xia Heng 夏恒 | 22 | Wuhan, Hubei | "对你爱不完" | — | — | ✔ | ✔ |

=== Episode 5 (15 August) ===
| Order | Artist | Age | Hometown | Song | Coach's and contestant's choices | | | |
| Order | Artist | Age | Hometown | Song | Chin | Feng | Ying | Kun |
|---|---|---|---|---|---|---|---|---|
| 1 | Zhang Jiang 张江 | 34 | Jinzhou, Liaoning | "泡沫" | ✔ | — | ✔ | ✔ |
| 2 | Li Man 李蔓 | 41 | Karamay, Xinjiang | "寂静的天空" | ✔ | — | — | ✔ |
| 3 | Ryan Yu 余枫 | 22 | Wuhan, Hubei | "有多少爱可以重来" | ✔ | — | — | ✔ |
| 4 | Mo Yanlin 莫艳琳 | 35 | Wuhan, Hubei | "平凡之路" | — | ✔ | — | — |
| 5 | Cui Xi 崔西 | 28 | Qinhuangdao, Hebei | "再见" | ✔ | — | — | — |
| 6 | Eve Ai 艾怡良 | 27 | Taiwan | "It's a Man's Man's Man's World" / "头发湿的" | — | — | ✔ | ✔ |
| 7 | Bai Mu 白穆 | 25 | Xi'an, Shaanxi | "流星" | ✔ | — | — | — |
| 8 | You Mei 由美 | 30 | Xi'an, Shaanxi | "那种女孩" | ✔ | ✔ | — | ✔ |
| 9 | Yu Bo 于勃 | 31 | Xi'an, Shaanxi | "飞机场的10:30" | ✔ | ✔ | ✔ | ✔ |
| 10 | Li Jiage 李嘉格 | 24 | Panjin, Liaoning | "普通朋友" | — | — | ✔ | ✔ |
| 11 | Zhu Qiang 朱强 | 24 | Changle, Fujian | "菊花台" | — | — | — | — |
| 12 | Rose Liu 刘明湘 | 28 | Taipei, Taiwan | "漂洋过海来看你" | ✔ | ✔ | ✔ | ✔ |
| 13 | Chen Xin 陈昕 | 36 | Guizhou | "空港" | — | ✔ | — | — |
| 14 | Maggie Mo 莫海婧 | 25 | Guiyang, Guizhou | "凤凰于飞" | ✔ | — | — | ✔ |
| 15 | Liu Shuangshuang 刘双双 | 25 | Jiaozuo, Henan | "致青春" | ✔ | — | ✔ | ✔ |
| 16 | Zhang Zhuo Hanwei 张卓含威 | 23 | Taizhou, Zhejiang | "笨小孩" | ✔ | — | — | — |
| 17 | Li Wa 莉娃 | 25 | Hainan | "没时间后悔" | ✔ | — | — | — |
| 18 | Wei Ran 魏然 | 23 | Huai'an, Jiangsu | "爱是怀疑" | — | — | — | — |
| 19 | Tang Siu Hau 邓小巧 | 25 | Hong Kong | "我们都寂寞" | ✔ | — | — | ✔ |

1. - Na Ying pressed Wang Feng's button.

=== Episode 6 (22 August) ===
After the revival round, Chyi Chin's team still had one vacant position left. After discussion by the four coaches and directors, they decided to have an Overtime Round, in which those who were unsuccessful in the revival round got a chance to sing for Chyi Chin and he would decide if he wanted the contestant to join his team.

| Order | Artist | Age | Hometown | Song | Coach's and contestant's choices | | | |
| Order | Artist | Age | Hometown | Song | Chin | Feng | Ying | Kun |
|---|---|---|---|---|---|---|---|---|
| 1 | Jeremy Teng 丁文淞 | 20 | Singapore | "第一次" | — | — | — | — |
| 2 | Zhang Jingyi 张婧懿 | 20 | Urumqi, Xinjiang | "玫瑰" | — | — | — | — |
| 3 | Apple Garden 苹果园 (Gao Lei 高磊 & Yu Wenfei 于文飞) | 30 / 26 | Beijing / Chongqing | "她他" | — | — | — | ✔ |
| 4 | Ekram 伊克拉木 | 36 | Turpan, Xinjiang | "我的心里只有你没有他" | ✔ | — | ✔ | ✔ |
| 5 | Qian Huaxing 钱华兴 | 27 | Tieling, Liaoning | "输了你赢了世界又如何" | — | — | — | — |
| 6 | Wei Xueman 魏雪漫 | 35 | Ziyang, Sichuan | "我是真的爱你" | ✔ | — | ✔ | ✔ |
Revival round
| 7 | Zhu Qiang 朱强 | 24 | Changle, Fujian | "卷珠帘" | — | — | Team full | — |
| 8 | Li Wenqi 李文琦 | 16 | Beijing | "流星" | ✔ | — | Team full | ✔ |
| 9 | Liang Dongjiang 梁栋江 | 22 | Qiqihar, Heilongjiang | "爱疯了" | — | — | Team full | Team full |
| 10 | Wei Ran 魏然 | 23 | Huai'an, Jiangsu | "彩虹天堂" | — | — | Team full | Team full |
| 11 | Zhang Jingyi 张婧懿 | 20 | Urumqi, Xinjiang | "斑马，斑马" | ✔ | ✔ | Team full | Team full |
| 12 | Qian Huaxing 钱华兴 | 27 | Tieling, Liaoning | "无辜" | — | Team full | Team full | Team full |
Overtime round
| 13 | Wei Ran 魏然 | 23 | Huai'an, Jiangsu | "I Believe I Can Fly" | ✔ | Team full | Team full | Team full |

=== Episode 9 (12 September) ===
Originally there were 16 contestants in Yang Kun's group, but Aisin-Gioro Mei was refused and her performance was not broadcast in the show as she was only 14 years old. The vacant position was decided to be given to Liang Dongjiang.

| Order | Artist | Age | Hometown | Song | Coach's and contestant's choices | | | |
| Order | Artist | Age | Hometown | Song | Chin | Feng | Ying | Kun |
|---|---|---|---|---|---|---|---|---|
| 1 | Zhu Qiang 朱强 | 24 | Changle, Fujian | "红颜 (2014版)" | — | — | — | — |
| 2 | Liang Dongjiang 梁栋江 | 22 | Qiqihar, Heilongjiang | "阴天" | — | — | — | ✔ |
| 3 | Ren Fei 任飞 | 28 | Yanbian, Jilin | "一杯接一杯" | — | — | — | — |
| 4 | Qian Huaxing 钱华兴 | 27 | Tieling, Liaoning | "My Friend" | — | — | — | — |

== The Battles ==
Coaches began narrowing down the playing field by training the contestants with the help of a "Dream Coach" ("Trusted Advisor" in all versions in English-speaking countries). Each episode features pairings from within a coach's team, and each battle concludes with the respective coach reducing his or her team from 16 to the top 4.

The format of the Battle Rounds is divided into two stages, the Battle Stage and the Sing-Off Stage. In the Battle Stage, each pairing jointly performs the same song, after which the 3 other coaches and the "Dream Coach" give their opinions. The main coach selects one of the pair to advance to the Sing-Off Stage. In the Sing-Off Stage, the top 8 singers are randomly paired and each performs a solo song, after which the main coach selects one of the pair to advance to the Team Championship Rounds.

Season three's advisors are Karen Mok and Chyi Yu (assistant coach) for Team Chyi Chin, Zheng Jun for Team Wang Feng, Jeff Chang for Team Na Ying and Jam Hsiao for Team Yang Kun.

Colour key

| Artist won the Battle and advanced to the Knockouts |
| Artist lost the Battle and was eliminated |

| Episode | Coach | Order | Winner | Song | Loser | Coaches' recommendations | | | | |
| Episode | Coach | Order | Winner | Song | Loser | Chin | Feng | Ying | Kun | Advisor |
|---|---|---|---|---|---|---|---|---|---|---|
| Episode 7 (29 August) | Na Ying | 1 | Li Jiage 李嘉格 | "Firework" | Mao Zeshao 毛泽少 | | | — | | |
| Episode 7 (29 August) | Na Ying | 2 | Li Wei 李维 | "贝加尔湖畔" | Zhou Shen 周深 | | | — | | |
| Episode 7 (29 August) | Na Ying | 3 | Xia Heng 夏恒 | "爱你在心口难开" | Zhang Zhiyong 张智勇 | | | — | | |
| Episode 7 (29 August) | Na Ying | 4 | Chen Bing 陈冰 | "他不爱我" | Eve Ai 艾怡良 | | | — | | |
| Episode 7 (29 August) | Na Ying | 5 | Zhang Bichen 张碧晨 | "一路上有你" | Wei Xueman 魏雪漫 | | | — | | |
| Episode 7 (29 August) | Na Ying | 6 | Zhang Jiang 张江 | "直觉" | Cui Zhonghua 崔忠华 | | | — | | |
| Episode 7 (29 August) | Na Ying | 7 | Liu Chenxi 刘辰希 | "让生命去等候" | Tu Hongjiang 吐洪江 | | | — | | |
| Episode 7 (29 August) | Na Ying | 8 | Rose Liu 刘明湘 | "Tonight, I Celebrate My Love" | Zheng Junshu 郑俊树 | | | — | | |
| Episode 8 (5 September) | Wang Feng | 1 | Yu Bo 于勃 | "像个孩子" | Chen Xin 陈昕 | | — | | | |
| Episode 8 (5 September) | Wang Feng | 2 | Mo Yanlin 莫艳琳 | "那些花儿" | Zhang Jingyi 张婧懿 | | — | | | |
| Episode 8 (5 September) | Wang Feng | 3 | Mark Chang 张心杰 | "光辉岁月" | Rocky Chan 陈乐基 | | — | | | |
| Episode 8 (5 September) | Wang Feng | 4 | You Mei 由美 | "也许明天" | Zhang Dandan 张丹丹 | | — | | | |
| Episode 8 (5 September) | Wang Feng | 5 | Li Qi 李琪 | "Make You Feel My Love" | Zhao Qi 赵祺 | | — | | | |
| Episode 8 (5 September) | Wang Feng | 6 | Geng Sihan 耿斯汉 | "春天里" | Chen Zhi 陈直 | | — | | | |
| Episode 8 (5 September) | Wang Feng | 7 | Perhat Khaliq 帕尔哈提 | "故乡" | Wang Zhuo 王卓 | | — | | | |
| Episode 8 (5 September) | Wang Feng | 8 | Wang Kaiqi 王凯琪 | "What's Up?" | Shi Yufan 石宇凡 | | — | | | |
| Episode 9 (12 September) | Yang Kun | 1 | Su Qifan 苏琪繁 | "袖手旁观" | Zhao Ke 赵钶 | | | | — | |
| Episode 9 (12 September) | Yang Kun | 2 | Maggie Mo 莫海婧 | "傻子" | Tang Siu Hau 邓小巧 | | | | — | |
| Episode 9 (12 September) | Yang Kun | 3 | Rong Qi 戎琦 | "王妃" | Qin Xiaolin 秦晓林 | | | | — | |
| Episode 9 (12 September) | Yang Kun | 4 | Robynn & Kendy | "说你爱我" | Apple Garden 苹果园 | | | | — | |
| Episode 9 (12 September) | Yang Kun | 5 | Xu Jianqiu 徐剑秋 | "泡沫" | Kai Kai 开开 | | | | — | |
| Episode 9 (12 September) | Yang Kun | 6 | Melody Tan 陈永馨 | "如果云知道" | Liu Ke 刘珂 | | | | — | |
| Episode 9 (12 September) | Yang Kun | 7 | Ryan Yu 余枫 | "日不落" | Liang Dongjiang 梁栋江 | | | | — | |
| Episode 9 (12 September) | Yang Kun | 8 | Li Wenqi 李文琦 | "Vincent" | Ekram 伊克拉木 | | | | — | |
| Episode 10 (19 September) | Chyi Chin | 1 | Nanma Ziga 南玛子呷 | "你的眼神" | Li Man 李蔓 | — | | | | |
| Episode 10 (19 September) | Chyi Chin | 2 | Lina Lou 楼沁 | "一想到你呀" | Li Wa 莉娃 | — | | | | |
| Episode 10 (19 September) | Chyi Chin | 3 | Shen Yulin 申钰林 | "爱情宣言" | Li Zhixian 李致贤 | — | | | | |
| Episode 10 (19 September) | Chyi Chin | 4 | Wei Ran 魏然 | "拒绝再玩" | Luo Jingwen 罗景文 | — | | | | |
| Episode 10 (19 September) | Chyi Chin | 5 | Cheng Shin-ci 郑心慈 | "外面的世界" | Wendy Woo 胡慧仪 | — | | | | |
| Episode 10 (19 September) | Chyi Chin | 6 | Zhang Zhuo Hanwei 张卓含威 | "爱" | Bai Mu 白穆 | — | | | | |
| Episode 10 (19 September) | Chyi Chin | 7 | UZ Qin 秦宇子 | "Bad" | Liu Zhijia 刘至佳 | — | | | | |
| Episode 10 (19 September) | Chyi Chin | 8 | Liu Shuangshuang 刘双双 | "千言万语" | Cui Xi 崔西 | — | | | | |

== The Knockouts ==
Colour key

| Artist won the Knockout and advanced to the Playoffs |
| Artist lost the Knockout and was eliminated |

| Episode | Coach | Order | Song | Artists | | Song | Coaches' recommendations | | | | |
| Episode | Coach | Order | Song | Winner | Loser | Song | Chin | Feng | Ying | Kun | Advisor |
|---|---|---|---|---|---|---|---|---|---|---|---|
| Episode 7 (29 August) | Na Ying | 1 | "新不了情" | Chen Bing 陈冰 | Xia Heng 夏恒 | "你快回来" | | | — | | |
| Episode 7 (29 August) | Na Ying | 2 | "哭砂" | Rose Liu 刘明湘 | Liu Chenxi 刘辰希 | "从开始到现在" | | | — | | |
| Episode 7 (29 August) | Na Ying | 3 | "那个男人" | Zhang Bichen 张碧晨 | Zhang Jiang 张江 | "一定要幸福" | | | — | | |
| Episode 7 (29 August) | Na Ying | 4 | "相爱后动物感伤" | Li Jiage 李嘉格 | Li Wei 李维 | "红豆" | | | — | | |
| Episode 8 (5 September) | Wang Feng | 1 | "我真的需要" | Geng Sihan 耿斯汉 | Yu Bo 于勃 | "下沙" | | — | | | |
| Episode 8 (5 September) | Wang Feng | 2 | "带我到山顶" | Wang Kaiqi 王凯琪 | You Mei 由美 | "一无所有" | | — | | | |
| Episode 8 (5 September) | Wang Feng | 3 | "Give Me One Reason" | Perhat Khaliq 帕尔哈提 | Mo Yanlin 莫艳琳 | "风吹麦浪" | | — | | | |
| Episode 8 (5 September) | Wang Feng | 4 | "It's a Man's Man's Man's World" | Li Qi 李琪 | Mark Chang 张心杰 | "没离开过" | | — | | | |
| Episode 9 (12 September) | Yang Kun | 1 | "Don't Break My Heart" | Li Wenqi 李文琦 | Rong Qi 戎琦 | "我终于失去了你" | | | | — | |
| Episode 9 (12 September) | Yang Kun | 2 | "我很忙" | Melody Tan 陈永馨 | Maggie Mo 莫海婧 | "你不在" | | | | — | |
| Episode 9 (12 September) | Yang Kun | 3 | "火烧的寂寞" | Xu Jianqiu 徐剑秋 | Su Qifan 苏琪繁 | "梦醒时分" | | | | — | |
| Episode 9 (12 September) | Yang Kun | 4 | "Back at One" | Ryan Yu 余枫 | Robynn & Kendy | "找自己" | | | | — | |
| Episode 10 (19 September) | Chyi Chin | 1 | "I Am Me Once More" | Liu Shuangshuang 刘双双 | Lina Lou 楼沁 | "眼泪" | — | | | | |
| Episode 10 (19 September) | Chyi Chin | 2 | "阴天" | Zhang Zhuo Hanwei 张卓含威 | Cheng Shin-ci 郑心慈 | "身骑白马" | — | | | | |
| Episode 10 (19 September) | Chyi Chin | 3 | "改变自己" | Wei Ran 魏然 | Nanma Ziga 南玛子呷 | "哎呀" | — | | | | |
| Episode 10 (19 September) | Chyi Chin | 4 | "想你的365天" | UZ Qin 秦宇子 | Shen Yulin 申钰林 | "难道" | — | | | | |

== Coach Appreciation Night (Episode 11) ==
This episode was first broadcast on September 21, 2014. In this episode, all 16 contestants performed the song 《火》 (Fire), and then each of the contestants performed part of the song that they sang during the blind auditions to thank the coaches.

== The Playoffs ==
There are two rounds in this stage. In the first round, the four contestants are randomly paired up, and the coach decides on the contestant to advance to the next round. In the second round, the two remaining contestants compete against each other, and the votes are decided by the media as well as the coach, who gives a total of 100 points for both contestants. The contestant with the highest number of votes is the team champion.

Round 1

| Episode | Coach | Order | Song | Artists | | Song | Coaches' recommendations | | | |
| Episode | Coach | Order | Song | Winner | Loser | Song | Chin | Feng | Ying | Kun |
|---|---|---|---|---|---|---|---|---|---|---|
| Episode 12 (26 September) | Na Ying | 1 | "Wrecking Ball" | Chen Bing 陈冰 | Rose Liu 刘明湘 | "秋意浓" | | | — | |
| Episode 12 (26 September) | Na Ying | 2 | "爱你的宿命" | Zhang Bichen 张碧晨 | Li Jiage 李嘉格 | "睁一只眼闭一只眼" | | | — | |
| Episode 12 (26 September) | Yang Kun | 3 | "无所谓" | Ryan Yu 余枫 | Li Wenqi 李文琦 | "是什么让我遇见这样的你" | | | | — |
| Episode 12 (26 September) | Yang Kun | 4 | "The Prayer" | Melody Tan 陈永馨 | Xu Jianqiu 徐剑秋 | "假如" | | | | — |
| Episode 13 (30 September) | Chyi Chin | 1 | "Crazy" / "Crazy in Love" | UZ Qin 秦宇子 | Zhang Zhuo Hanwei 张卓含威 | "领悟" | — | | | |
| Episode 13 (30 September) | Chyi Chin | 2 | "眼色" | Wei Ran 魏然 | Liu Shuangshuang 刘双双 | "月半弯" | — | | | |
| Episode 13 (30 September) | Wang Feng | 3 | "有多少爱可以重来" | Perhat Khaliq 帕尔哈提 | Geng Sihan 耿斯汉 | "爱着谁" | | — | | |
| Episode 13 (30 September) | Wang Feng | 4 | "Blank Page" | Wang Kaiqi 王凯琪 | Li Qi 李琪 | "你是我心爱的姑娘" | | — | | |

Round 2

| Episode | Coach | Order | Artist | Song | Coach points | Media points | Total points | Result | Coaches' recommendations | | | |
| Episode | Coach | Order | Artist | Song | Coach points | Media points | Total points | Result | Chin | Feng | Ying | Kun |
|---|---|---|---|---|---|---|---|---|---|---|---|---|
| Episode 12 (26 September) | Na Ying | 1 | Chen Bing 陈冰 | "逆光" | 50 | 22 | 72 | Eliminated | — | — | — | — |
| Episode 12 (26 September) | Na Ying | 2 | Zhang Bichen 张碧晨 | "后会无期" | 50 | 79 | 129 | Advanced | ✔ | ✔ | — | ✔ |
| Episode 12 (26 September) | Yang Kun | 3 | Ryan Yu 余枫 | "Treasure" | 50 | 77 | 127 | Advanced | — | ✔ | ✔ | — |
| Episode 12 (26 September) | Yang Kun | 4 | Melody Tan 陈永馨 | "我" | 50 | 24 | 74 | Eliminated | ✔ | — | — | — |
| Episode 13 (30 September) | Chyi Chin | 1 | UZ Qin 秦宇子 | "安静" | 50 | 64 | 114 | Advanced | — | ✔ | — | ✔ |
| Episode 13 (30 September) | Chyi Chin | 2 | Wei Ran 魏然 | "痛并快乐着" | 50 | 37 | 87 | Eliminated | — | — | ✔ | — |
| Episode 13 (30 September) | Wang Feng | 3 | Wang Kaiqi 王凯琪 | "我如此爱你" | 45 | 50 | 95 | Eliminated | ✔ | — | ✔ | ✔ |
| Episode 13 (30 September) | Wang Feng | 4 | Perhat Khaliq 帕尔哈提 | "思念谁" | 55 | 51 | 106 | Advanced | — | — | — | — |

Non-competition performances
| Order | Performers | Song |
|---|---|---|
| 12.1 | Na Ying & her team (Chen Bing 陈冰, Li Jiage 李嘉格, Rose Liu 刘明湘, and Zhang Bichen 张碧晨) | "Can't Take My Eyes Off You" |
| 12.2 | Yang Kun & his team (Li Wenqi 李文琦, Melody Tan 陈永馨, Ryan Yu 余枫, and Xu Jianqiu 徐剑秋) | "Young Man" |
| 13.1 | Chyi Chin & his team (Liu Shuangshuang 刘双双, UZ Qin 秦宇子, Wei Ran 魏然, and Zhang Zhuo Hanwei 张卓含威) | "往事随风" |
| 13.2 | Wang Feng & his team (Geng Sihan 耿斯汉, Li Qi 李琪, Perhat Khaliq 帕尔哈提, and Wang Kaiqi 王凯琪) | "像梦一样自由" |

== Final Battle Concert (Episode 14) ==
This episode was first broadcast at 21:10 (UTC+8, 14:10 in London, 9:10 in Eastern USA) on October 1, 2014. The final battle concert was held in Macau.

== Live show ==
=== Episode 15: Finals (7 October) ===
This episode was first broadcast at 20:00 (UTC+8, 13:00 in London, 8:00 in Eastern USA) on October 7, 2014. The final concert was held in Capital Indoor Stadium, Beijing. Zhang Bichen was named the winner.

| Coach | Artist | Order | First song (with coach) | Order | Second song | Order | Third song | Order | Fourth song | Media points | Public points | Total points | Result |
|---|---|---|---|---|---|---|---|---|---|---|---|---|---|
| Yang Kun | Ryan Yu 余枫 | 1 | "空城" | 5 | "至少还有你" | 9 | "牧马人" | N/A (already eliminated) | | | | | Third place |
| Na Ying | Zhang Bichen 张碧晨 | 2 | "相见不如怀念" | 6 | "我只在乎你" | 10 | "梦一场" | 12 | "时间都去哪儿了" | 57 | 61.8 | 118.8 | Winner |
| Chyi Chin | UZ Qin 秦宇子 | 3 | "狼" | 7 | "Are You Ready" | N/A (already eliminated) | | | | | | | Fourth place |
| Wang Feng | Perhat Khaliq 帕尔哈提 | 4 | "有些事我们永远无法左右" | 8 | "礼物" | N/A (given bye) | | 11 | "花儿为什么这样红" | 44 | 38.2 | 82.2 | Runner-up |

== Artists' appearances on earlier seasons or other talent shows ==
- Li Man sang in the blind auditions and revival round for season one, but both failed to turn any chairs. Both performances were not broadcast on television, but on http://v.qq.com/cover/b/brya6a9oh56w2dc/e00156bxylw.html.
- Mark Chang and Rose Liu appeared on the fourth season and the fifth season of One Million Star, and both of them finished in the second place.
- Eve Ai and UZ Qin appeared on the first season and the fifth season of Super Idol as a challenger in the Challenging Round respectively. Ai also participated in the fifth season of Super Idol as a contestant, and went on to become the winner of the show.
- Cheng Shin-ci and Wendy Woo appeared on the second season and the third season of Chinese Million Star, and finished in the second and fifth place respectively.
- Tang Siu Hau appeared on the first season of The Voice, the singing competition from TVB, and finished in the sixth place.

== Ratings ==
| Episode | Date | Time | Rating | Percent | National ranking |
|---|---|---|---|---|---|
| 1 | 18 July 2014 | 9:10–11:10 PM | 4.30 | 13.07% | 1 |
| 2 | 25 July 2014 | 9:10–11:10 PM | 4.19 | 13.26% | 1 |
| 3 | 1 August 2014 | 9:10–11:10 PM | 4.29 | 13.44% | 1 |
| 4 | 8 August 2014 | 9:10–11:10 PM | 4.61 | 14.24% | 1 |
| 5 | 15 August 2014 | 9:10–11:10 PM | 4.27 | 13.28% | 1 |
| 6 | 22 August 2014 | 9:10–11:10 PM | 4.17 | 13.02% | 1 |
| 7 | 29 August 2014 | 9:10–11:10 PM | 4.66 | 13.80% | 1 |
| 8 | 5 September 2014 | 9:10–11:10 PM | 4.09 | 12.69% | 1 |
| 9 | 12 September 2014 | 9:10–11:10 PM | 4.007 | 12.46% | 1 |
| 10 | 19 September 2014 | 9:10–11:10 PM | 3.63 | 11.899% | 1 |
| 11 | 21 September 2014 | 9:10–11:10 PM | 1.729 | 5.611% | 2 |
| 12 | 26 September 2014 | 9:10–11:10 PM | 3.564 | 11.088% | 1 |
| 12 | 26 September 2014 | 9:10–11:10 PM | 3.564 | 11.088% | 1 |
| 12 | 26 September 2014 | 9:10–11:10 PM | 3.564 | 11.088% | 1 |
| 13 | 30 September 2014 | 9:10–11:10 PM | 3.134 | 10.134% | 1 |
| 14 | 1 October 2014 | 9:10–11:10 PM | 0.643 | 2.434% | 1 |
| 15 | 7 October 2014 | 8:00–11:00 PM | 5.613 | 16.268% | 1 |

The data determined by CSM.

== International broadcast ==
=== Singapore ===
In Singapore, the Singaporean audition shows were aired at 20:00 on July 10 and 17, 2014; the first episode aired at 19:00 on July 19, 2014. All the subsequent shows will be aired every Saturday. All shows above aired at MediaCorp Channel 8. Using the Toggle app, viewers in Singapore can watch the show exactly the same time Zhejiang TV broadcast for the first time (21:10 every Friday).

The 4th episode was postponed to 22:30 on August 9, 2014 due to the Singapore National Day Parade.

=== Malaysia ===
In Malaysia, the Malaysian qualification shows were aired at 22:30 on July 5 and 12, 2014; the regular episodes will be aired every Saturday, starting from July 19, 2014 at 8TV.

=== Hong Kong ===
In Hong Kong, the first episode aired at 21:10 on July 18, 2014 at now Hong Kong. The first episode aired at 13:15 on August 24, 2014 at HD Jade.

=== Taiwan ===
In Taiwan, the first episode aired at 20:00 on September 13, 2014 at CTi Variety.
