= Rose Liu =

American singer-songwriter

- Born: 14 September 1986 (age 39); San Francisco
- Education: New York University
- Occupations: Singer; Songwriter
- Musical career
- Genres: Pop; Mandopop

Rose Liu (born San Francisco (Chinese: 劉明湘; simplified Chinese: 刘明湘; traditional Chinese: 劉明湘; pinyin: líumíngxiāng), 14 September 1986) is a Chinese-American singer and songwriter best known for her appearances in the televised shows including The Voice of China and One Million Star, and for her albums Judge Me Not and Ain't Gonna Wait. Liu is the first American born artist to make it to top 4 on The Voice of China.

== Early life and education ==
Rose Liu was born and grew up in San Mateo, California. She graduated from New York University where she studied psychology and economics. Liu learned Chinese at National Taiwan Normal University.

== Career ==
Liu was a contestant in American Idol, an American singing competition television series. In 2009, she attended One Million Star Season 5, where Liu finished runner-up for the finals. In 2010, she was a contestant in American Idol Million Star: Star Legend, where she finished runner-up on 22 August.

In 2014, Liu attended The Voice of China season 3 at ZTV, where she got:" I WANT YOU" from Qi Qin, Na Ying, and Yang Kun. She joined Na Ying's team. On 29 August, she went on to the semi-finals. In 2016, Liu released her first album Judge me not. In 2017, she won "The Best Artist of the Year"(Bronze) in the 7th Global Hits.

In November 2017, Liu was a participant in the first MÜST (Music Copyright Society of Chinese Taipei) International Songwriting Camp, which took place at the Grand Hotel Taipei in Taiwan, attended by writers from Finland, Hong Kong, Japan, Korea, Macao, Malaysia, Philippines, Singapore, Sweden, Thailand, the United States and Vietnam.

In 2022, Liu released "Ain't Gonna Wait" single and title track of her EP of the same name.
