= Sunny Days (group) =

South Korean girl group

- Origin: Seoul, South Korea
- Genres: K-pop
- Years active: 2012–2016
- Label: Haeun Entertainment
- Past members: Jeon Minji; Zhang Bichen; Lee Gyuhee; Hwang Jihee; Kim Soohyun; Cho Seoyeon; Jung SooJung; Lee Sunkyung; Heo Jung Yoon; Hong Heuira; Da Young; Da Som

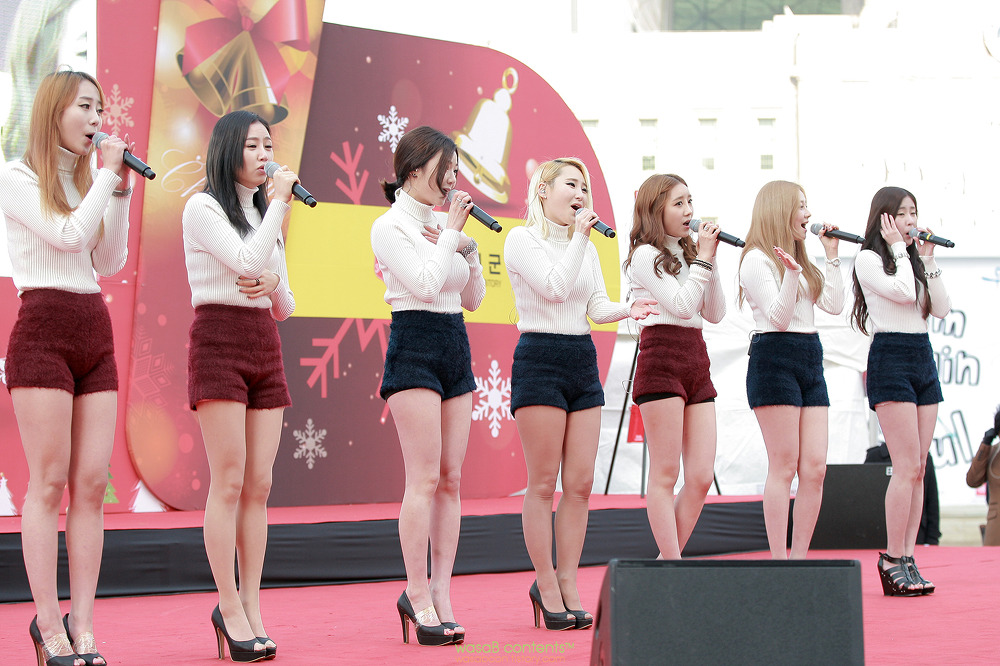
Girl group Sunny Days in 2014

Sunny Days (Korean: 써니데이즈) was a South Korean girl group that debuted under Haeun Entertainment in 2012 with the song, "Take Away." After going through line-up changes, the group released its final single, "Blah Blah," in 2015, before disbanding in 2016.

== History ==
=== 2012: Take Away, Glory Korea, Don't Touch Me and member changes ===
Sunny Days debuted with the song "Take Away" on May 18, 2012. The album has 2 tracks: "Take Away" and "Take Away (instrumental)". On June 19 it was announced that Minji would be departing from the group due to an ankle injury and new member Seoyeon would be taking her place. Sunny Days also took part in singing "Glory Korea" for Korean athletes competing in the 2012 Olympics. The "Glory Korea" single album contained "Glory Korea (instrumental)" and "One Step Closer". This album was released on July 18, 2012.

Sunny Days came back with their 2nd promotional single, "Don't Touch Me", which was also the 1st song they had a music video for, which was released on July 26, 2012.

=== 2013: I Must Be Crazy, Meet a Girl Like You, & new members ===
Sunny Days made a comeback with "I Must Be Crazy" on April 8, 2013. Their 4th single, "Meeting a Girl Like You" was released on July 31, 2013. During this comeback, members Bichen and Gyuhee were added. Bichen was a former winner of the KPop world festival.

=== 2014: Real Vocal sub-unit, lineup changes, I Don't Need You Boy & Rain OST ===
Sunny Days subunit group Real Vocal debuted "With the Same Lips" on SBS The Show. The song was released on March 12, 2014. Real Vocal consists of Sunkyung, Jihee and Soohyun.

Sunny Days made a comeback, performing their 5th single "I Don't Need You Boy" (or "Half the World Are Men") as their comeback song on MBC's "Show Champion" on July 30. The song was released on July 31, 2014 with Sunny Days as a 5-member group. Gyuhee & Bichen left the group and were replaced by a new member, Jung Yoon. Seoyeon became inactive for this comeback due to health issues. Bichen left the group to pursue her solo career and competed as one of the contestants in the third season of The Voice of China, in which she eventually emerged as the final winner.

Sunkyung was featured in One Way Dandelion's OST Part 2 for the song "Rain" which was released on December 2, 2014.

=== 2015: Lineup changes, guerillas, comeback plans, Blah Blah, & disbandment ===
Sunny Days had another lineup change, this time Jihee, Soojung & Soohyun all left the group together due to them choosing not to renew their contracts, leaving Sunkyung and Jungyoon as the two confirmed members with Sunkyung being the only original member. After fans' research & many Sunny Days' event performances, it was found that there were 3 new members confirmed for the group, Heuira, Dayoung and maknae Dasom.

Sunny Days started having guerilla performances in Sincheon together with Haeun Entertainment's boy group Lose Control (LC). They performed their previous songs along with some dance covers and duets of Sunkyung with Heuira.

Sunny Days were about to come back in the first half of 2015 but it was pushed month after month.

Sunny Days members start hinting a comeback with their Instagram posts on 23 September. Few weeks later, Sunny Days' Facebook description indeed meant a comeback on that date. They started posting teaser pictures & dropped Blah Blah on the 23rd. The MV teaser was released a day after. Sunny Days' fans were disappointed as their comeback did not go well and were worried of disbandment. Later, it was confirmed via email that Sunny Days was disbanded.

== Final lineup ==
- Sunkyung (2012–2016)
- Jungyoon (2014–2016)
- Heuira (2015–2016)
- Dayoung (2015–2016)
- Dasom (2015–2016)

=== Former members ===
- Minji (2012)
- Zhang Bichen (2013–2014)
- Gyuhee (2013–2014)
- Soojung (2012–2014)
- Seoyeon (2012–2013)
- Soohyun (2012–2014)
- Jihee (2012–2014)

== Discography ==
=== Singles ===
Title	Year	Peak chart positions	Sales
Title	Year	KOR	Sales
"Take Away" (가져가)	2012	—	—N/a
"Glory Korea"	2012	—	—N/a
"Don't Touch Me" (만지지마)	2012	86	KOR: 41,292+
"I Must Be Crazy" (미친게 틀림없어)	2013	—	—N/a
"Meet A Girl Just Like You" (너랑 똑같은 여자 만나봐)	2013	63	KOR: 36,915+
"I Don't Need You Boy" (세상의 반은 남자야)	2014	—	—N/a
"Blah Blah"	2015	—	—N/a
"—" denotes releases that did not chart.
