= Zhang Lei (singer) =

Chinese singer (born 1981)

- Born: 7 October 1981 (age 43); Mudanjiang, Heilongjiang, China
- Occupation: Singer
- Years active: 2007–present

Chinese name
- Traditional Chinese: 張磊
- Simplified Chinese: 张磊
Transcriptions
Standard Mandarin
- Hanyu Pinyin: Zhāng Lěi
- Musical career
- Origin: Mudanjiang, Heilongjiang
- Genres: Folk, Ballad
- Instrument(s): Vocals, Guitar

Zhang Lei (Chinese: 张磊; pinyin: Zhāng Lěi; born 7 October 1981) is a Chinese singer. He took part in The Voice of China Season 4, when he sang the song "南山南." He then went on to be Team Na Ying's team champion and was the overall Champion of the season. He beat Queen T (陈梓童) from Team Jay Chou, who settled for the runner-up position. At the same time, he also celebrated his 34th birthday at the Beijing National Stadium at the live show of The Voice of China Season 4.

== The Voice of China (season 4) ==
Zhang Lei went to The Voice of China Season 4 and was broadcast on the 3rd episode. He sang the song "南山南" and had 3 turns, all except for Jay Chou's. He then chose Na Ying to be his coach. In The Battles, he went against Zhū Qiáng (朱强), a student from the third season who failed to get any turns. He then went on to be in one of Team Na Ying's top 4. In the cross battle, he fought with Leon Lee (李安) in Team Jay Chou, and had a landslide victory of 47–4 and made it to the overall top 10. Next, he went on and made it to the overall top 5 with the highest score of 94.6% and was announced as Team Na Ying's team champion. In the finals, he made it to the overall top 2 with again the highest score along with Queen T (陈梓童) from Team Jay Chou. In the final round, he won Queen T with the score of 58.53% to 41.47%, who settled for second place.

== Discography ==
=== OST ===
Title	Singer	Notes	Ref.
Return the Green Mountains to the Green Mountains	Zhang Lei	New Generation: Bomb Disposal Expert Theme	

Awards and achievements
Preceded by Zhang Bichen	The Voice of China Winner; 2015	Succeeded by N/A
