= Melody Tan =

Malaysian singer

Melody Tan Yong Xin
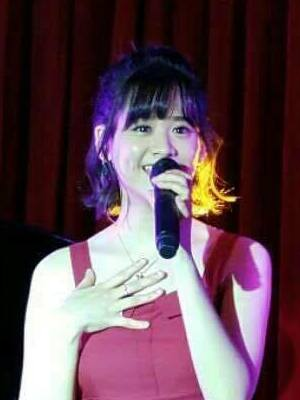
- Born: February 10, 1993 (age 32); New Zealand
- Occupation: Singer
- Years active: 2014-present

Chinese name
- Traditional Chinese: 陳永馨
- Simplified Chinese: 陈永馨
Transcriptions
Standard Mandarin
- Hanyu Pinyin: Chén Yǒngxīn
Hakka
- Pha̍k-fa-sṳ: Chhìn Iún-hîn
Yue: Cantonese
- Jyutping: Can4 Wing5 Hing1
Southern Min
- Hokkien POJ: Tân Éng-heng
- Tâi-lô: Tân Íng-hing

Melody Tan Yong Xin (born February 10, 1993), is a Malaysian singer who rose to fame after becoming a contestant in the third season of The Voice of China in 2014.

== Biography ==
Tan was born in 1993 in New Zealand, and at the age of three, she followed her parents to live in Malaysia. In 2013, she studied at the College of Music at Guangxi Arts Institute, and won an intra-school competition. In the same year, she took part in Guangxi Television's reality show Challenge the Champion, in which she imitated Christina Aguilera. She also sang in a hotel, and received a higher pay than others as she is from Malaysia.

In 2014, Tan took part in the third season of The Voice of China, and sang Wang Leehom's "The Things You Don't Know" (你不知道的事) during the blind auditions. She was admitted to Yang Kun's team, where she made it to second place in his team, after Yu Feng.

== Personal life ==
In July 2014, Melody revealed that she had a boyfriend. In September 2014, she was rumored to be in a relationship with fellow contestant Liu Ke, after singing Valen Hsu's "If The Clouds Know" (如果云知道) during the battle round and embracing each other for 20 seconds.(Melody herself said that this is a false rumor)

== Filmography ==
=== MV ===
Title	Artist	Year
夏未央	罗云熙	2015

== Discography ==
=== Singles ===
Year	Title	Album	Label
2016	Love, Written for You 爱只为你写	TBA	GME Music

== Accolades ==
Year	Award	Work	Result
2016	Asia Golden Dragon Awards, Asia Up Rising Celebrity Excellence	N/A	Won
