= Zhang Bichen =

Chinese singer (born 1989)

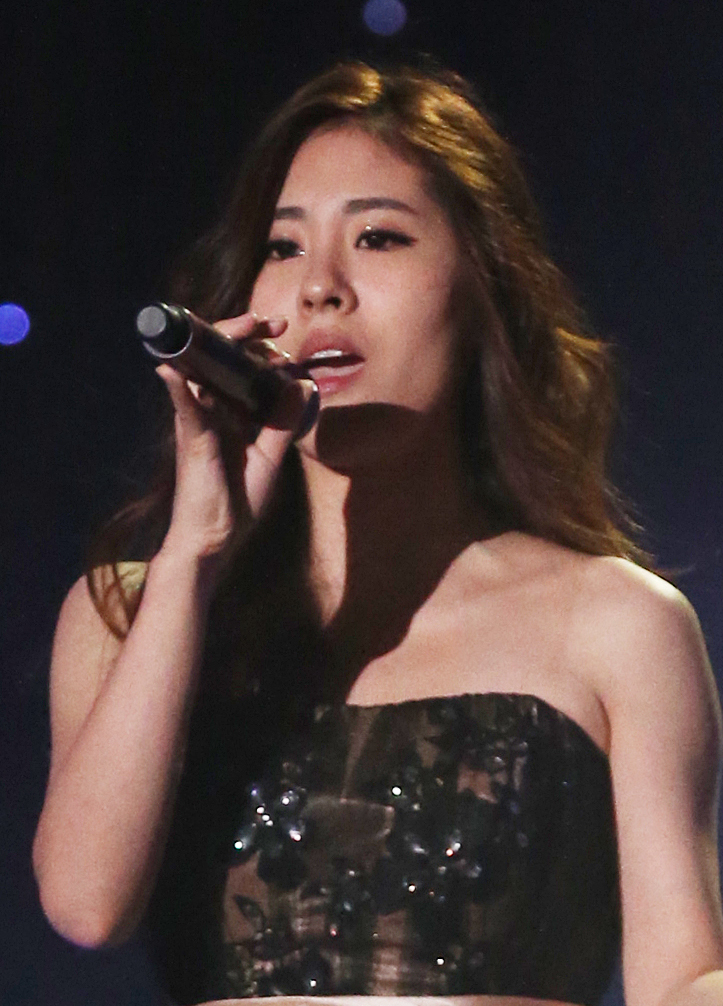
- Zhang in 2012
- Born: September 10, 1989 (age 36); Tianjin, China
- Education: Tianjin Foreign Studies University (BLit)
- Occupation: Singer
- Years active: 2012–present
- Agent(s): Haeun, The Voice of Dream, Zhang Bichen Studio
- Children: 1
- Musical career
- Origin: China
- Genres: Pop
- Instrument: Vocals
- Labels: Haeun, Bravo

Chinese name
- Traditional Chinese: 張碧晨
- Simplified Chinese: 张碧晨
Transcriptions
Standard Mandarin
- Hanyu Pinyin: Zhāng Bìchén

Zhang Bichen (Chinese: 张碧晨; pinyin: Zhāng Bìchén; born September 10, 1989), also known professionally as Diamond Zhang, is a Chinese singer. She was a member of the South Korean girl group Sunny Days. In 2014, she won the Chinese singing contest The Voice of China.

== Early life ==
Zhang was born in Tianjin, China on September 10, 1989. For undergraduate studies, Zhang attended Tianjin Foreign Studies University with a major in French.

== Career ==
=== 2009–2013: Sunny Days ===
In 2013, Zhang became a trainee in South Korean management company Haeun Entertainment. In the same year, she debuted her singing career by becoming a member of South Korean girl group Sunny Days. In 2013, she won the championship of K-Pop World Festival in China. In 2014, she left the group.

=== 2014–present: Morning Bound for Midnight ===
In 2014, Zhang competed in season 3 of the Chinese singing talent show The Voice of China, and was the winner where she covered the Chinese singer Reno Wang's song "Where Is the Time Gone?" in the final round. In the same year, she sang the interlude song titled "In the Span of a Kiss" for the Chinese television drama The Young Doctor. In 2015, she sang the interlude song titled "Annual Ring" for the Chinese television drama The Journey of Flower. In the same year, she appeared on the Chinese reality show Be the Idol. In 2016, she appeared on the Chinese reality show Mask Singer. In the same year, she held her first solo concert, and released her debut solo studio album, Morning Bound for Midnight. In March 2017, she appeared on the Chinese singing competition Singer.

=== Singer 2017 ===
In March 2017, Zhang took part in Singer 2017, the fifth season of Hunan Television's long-running series I Am a Singer which series were renamed to Singer on the same year. She entered the competition as the third challenger; she was originally eliminated in her debut week per the challenge rules (which required her to finish in the top four, where Zhang finished last), but eliminations were canceled after one contestant (Tan Jing) withdrew from the competition. Despite her elimination in the following week (for finishing last in both weeks), she eventually made it to the finals after qualifying in the Breakouts, where she finished sixth.

== Personal life ==
On January 22, 2021, Zhang announced on her social media account that she had given birth to a girl in 2019, whose father is Chinese singer Hua Chenyu. Hua also published posts acknowledging this.

== Discography ==
- Morning Bound for Midnight (2016)
- Time (2021)
- Echoes of Now (2025)

=== Soundtrack appearances ===
| Year | English title | Chinese title | Television series/film | Notes |
|---|---|---|---|---|
| 2014 | Between a Kiss | 一吻之間 | The Young Doctor | |
| 2014 | Sound of Love | 爱之声 | The Young Doctor | with Xu Feng |
| 2015 | Happy Dream | 幸福梦 | Happy Dream | |
| 2015 | Don't Forget I Love You | 不要忘记我爱你 | Hero Dog & Hot Girl | |
| 2015 | Annual Ring | 年轮 | The Journey of Flower | |
| 2015 | I Only Slowly Walk Away | 我只是慢慢走远 | Lady of the Dynasty | |
| 2015 | Young and Reckless | 年少轻狂 | This is Me | |
| 2015 | If Everything Hasn't Happened | 如果一切没有发生过 | Oh My God | |
| 2016 | Why Do I Feel Like Telling Him Who I Am | 为什么我好想告诉他我是谁 | Never Said Goodbye | |
| 2016 | Time and Words | 时光笔墨 | Noble Aspirations | |
| 2016 | The Next Second | 下一秒 | Love O2O | |
| 2016 | When Love Comes Knocking | 当爱来敲门 | Stay with Me | |
| 2017 | Bracing the Chill | 凉凉 | Eternal Love | with Aska Yang |
| 2017 | The Nutcracker | 胡桃夹子 | The Village of No Return | |
| 2017 | Lake Baikal | 贝加尔湖畔 | The Battle at Dawn | with Sun Nan |
| 2017 | Gaze | 望 | Princess Agents | with Zhao Liying |
| 2018 | Listening Snow | 听雪 | The Flame's Daughter | |
| 2018 | Blood like Ink | 血如墨 | Legend of Fuyao | |
| 2018 | Only Want Ordinary | 只要平凡 | Dying to Survive | with Jason Zhang |
| 2019 | A Whole New World (Mandarin version) | 新的世界 | Aladdin | with William Chan |
| 2019 | That Moment | 彼時 | My True Friend | |
| 2019 | Water Comes From Heaven | 水从天上来 | Love and Destiny | with Zheng Yunlong |
| 2020 | Heart Desire at Peace | 心欲止水 | Eternal Love of Dream | |
| 2021 | The Direction of Light | 光的方向 | The Long Ballad | |
| 2022 | We Will Meet Again | 有时无期 | Thousand Years For You | |
| 2023 | The Black Moonlight | 黑月光 | Till the End of the Moon | with Mao Buyi |
| 2023 | Theme Song of Movie | 道别 | Flashover | |
| 2023 | Cage | 笼 | Lost in the stars | |
| 2024 | Dream's Candle Clothes | 梦的烛衣 | Fangs of Fortune | |

Awards and achievements
| Preceded by Li Qi | The Voice of China Winner; 2014 | Succeeded by Zhang Lei |
