= The Voice of China =

- Genre: Reality competition
- Created by: John de Mol Jr.
- Directed by: Jin Lei
- Presented by: Hu Qiaohua
- Judges: Liu Huan; Na Ying; Yang Kun; Harlem Yu; A-mei; Wang Feng; Chyi Chin; Jay Chou
- Country of origin: China
- Original language: Mandarin
- No. of seasons: 4

Production
- Production locations: East China Normal University Gymnasium; Shanghai Stadium; Baoshan Stadium; Jiaxing University
- Camera setup: Multi-camera
- Running time: 44–104 minutes
- Production company: Canxing Productions; Talpa Productions (licensor)

Original release
- Network: Zhejiang Television
- Release: 13 July 2012 – 7 October 2015

Related
- The Voice (franchise)

The Voice of China (Chinese: 中国好声音; pinyin: Zhōngguó Hǎo Shēngyīn) is a Chinese reality television singing competition broadcast on Zhejiang Television. Based on the original The Voice of Holland, the concept of the series is to find new singing talent (solo or duets) contested by aspiring singers drawn from public auditions. The winner is determined by votes cast by a media judging panel and live audience. They receive a record deal with various labels for winning the competition. The winners of the four seasons have been: Bruce Liang, Li Qi, Diamond Zhang, and Zhang Lei.

The series employs a panel of four coaches who critique the artists' performances and guide their teams of selected artists through the remainder of the season. They also compete to ensure that their act wins the competition, thus making them the winning coach. Members of the coaching panel include Na Ying (season 1–4), Harlem Yu (season 1–2, 4), Yang Kun (season 1, 3), Liu Huan (season 1), A-mei (season 2), Wang Feng (season 2–4), Chyi Chin (season 3), and Jay Chou (season 4).

The show began airing under the name of The Voice of China on 13 July 2012. In 2016, contractual disputes arose between Talpa Holding, the owner of the show's format and franchise, and Canxing Production, the show's producing company. It was revealed the former has inked a joint venture with another producing company, Talent International, to produce the upcoming seasons of the show. In a response to the dispute and prevent copyright breaches, Canxing Productions launched Sing! China, a rebranded version of the show which the producers claimed to come with an original format, though it still shares several similarities with The Voice of China.

== Format ==
The series consists of three main phases: a blind audition, a battle phase, and live performance shows. The four judges / coaches choose teams of contestants through a blind audition process. Each judge has the length of the auditioner's performance to decide if he or she wants that singer on his or her team. If two or more judges want the same singer (as happens frequently), the singer has the final choice of coach.

Each team of singers is mentored and developed by its respective coach. In the second stage, called the battle phase, coaches have two of their team members battle against each other directly by singing the same song together, with the coach choosing which team member to advance from each of individual "battles" into the first live round. Within that first live round, the surviving four acts from each team again compete head-to-head, with public votes determining the best of four acts from each team that will advance to the final eight, while the coach chooses which of the remaining three acts comprises the other performer remaining on the team.

In the final phase, the remaining contestants compete against each other in live broadcasts. The audience and the coaches have equal say in deciding who moves on to the final 4 phase. With one contestant remaining for each coach, the four contestants will compete against each other in the final round with the outcome decided solely by public vote. However, in Season 4, there may be multiple contestants for a coach to enter the Grand Final, or may be no contestants for the respective coaches.

The Voice of China (season 1–4) was sponsored by JDB Group and Pechoin.

=== Coaches' timeline ===
Hu Qiaohua has hosted all four seasons.

Coaches gallery

Yang Kun (2012, 2014)

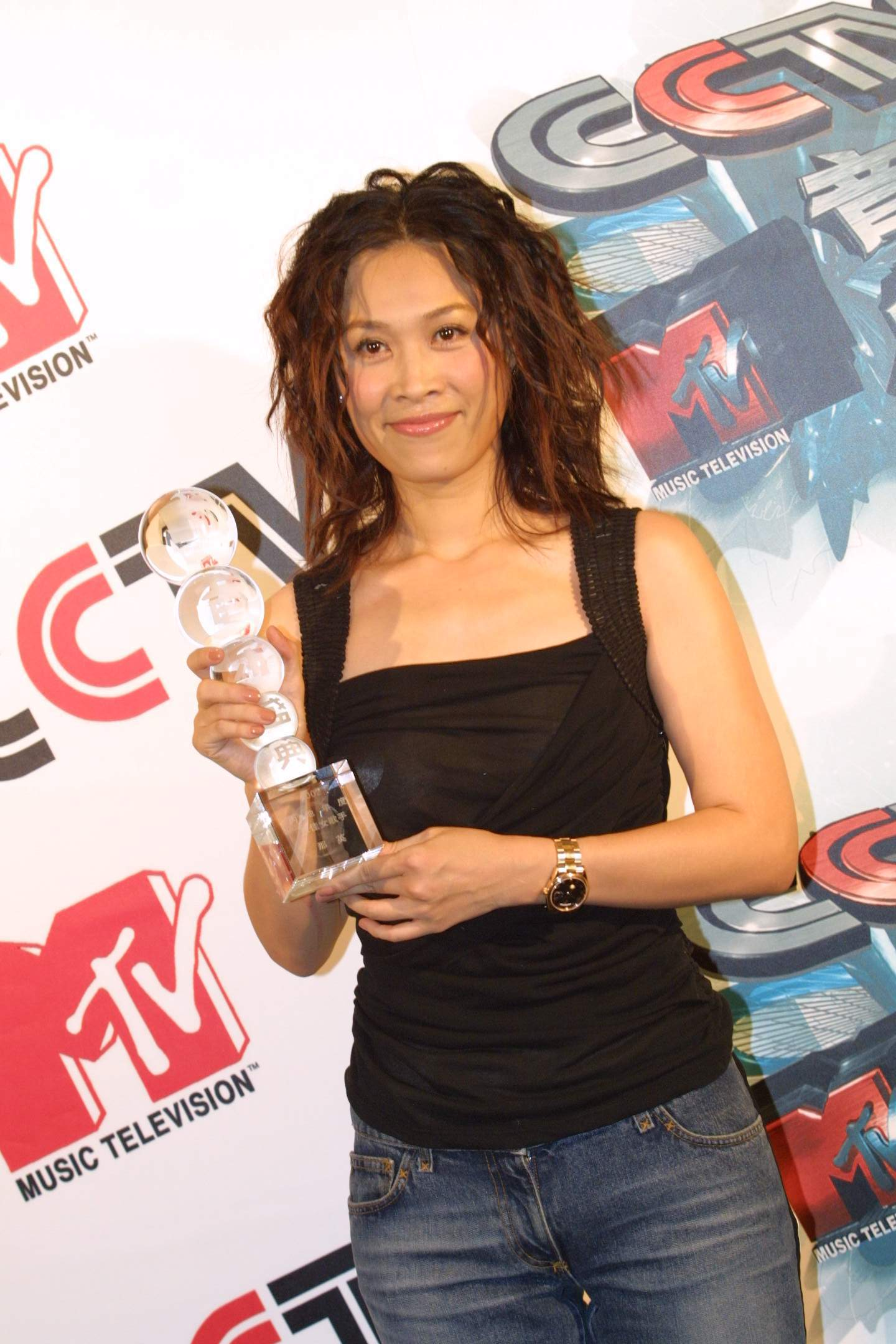
Na Ying (2012–2015)

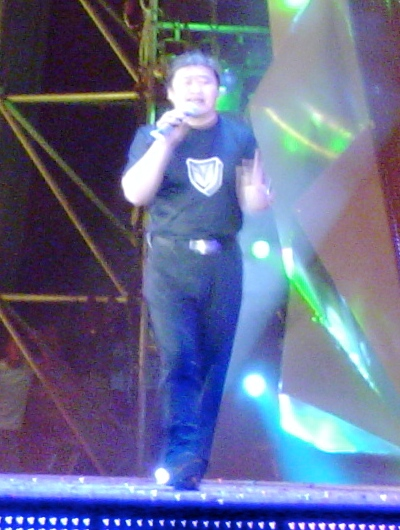
Liu Huan (2012)

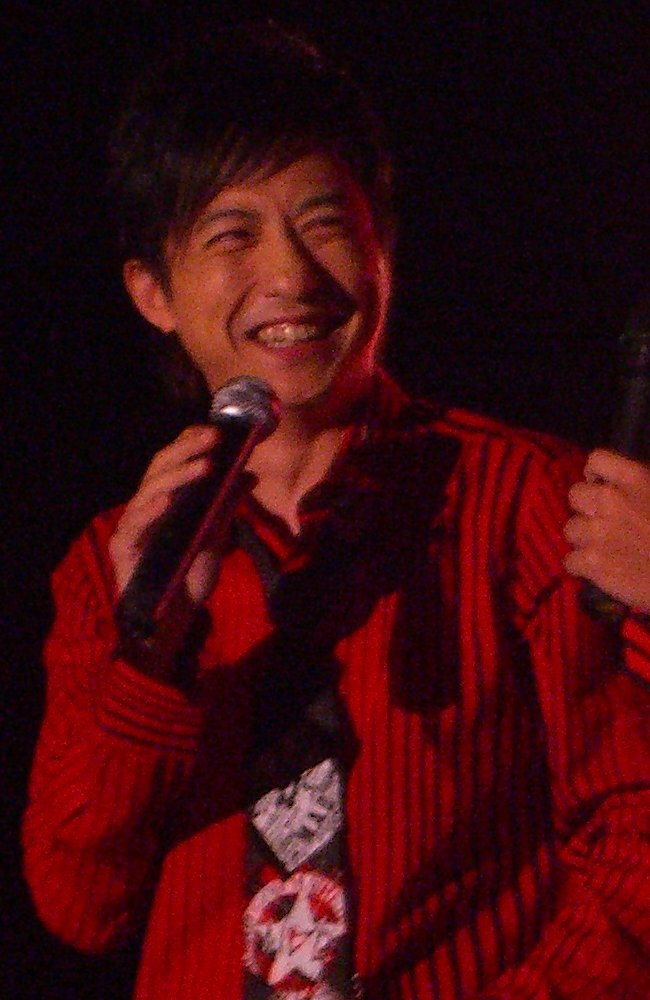
Harlem Yu (2012–2013, 2015)

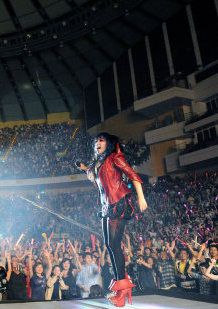
A-mei (2013)

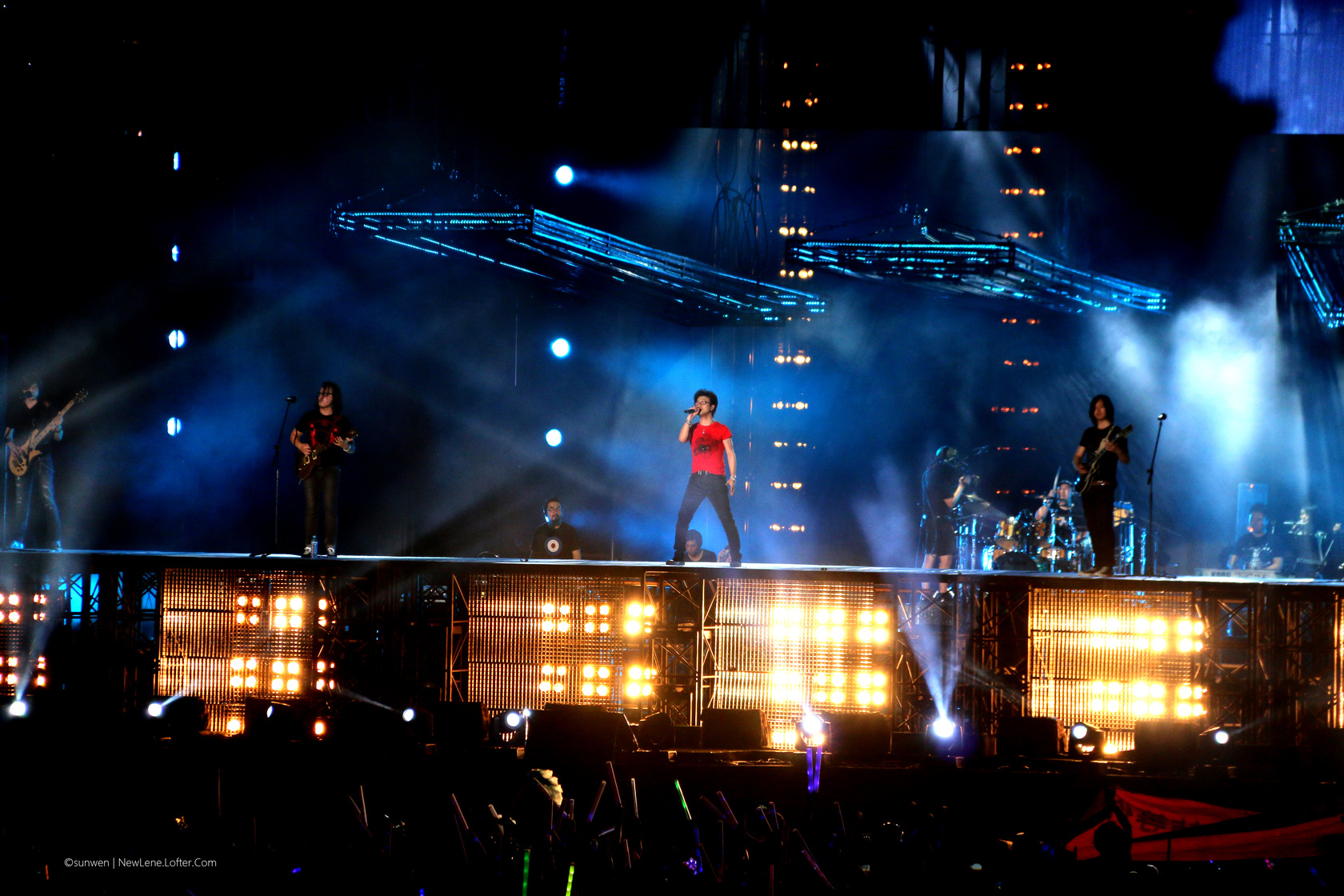
Wang Feng (2013–2015)

Chyi Chin (2014)

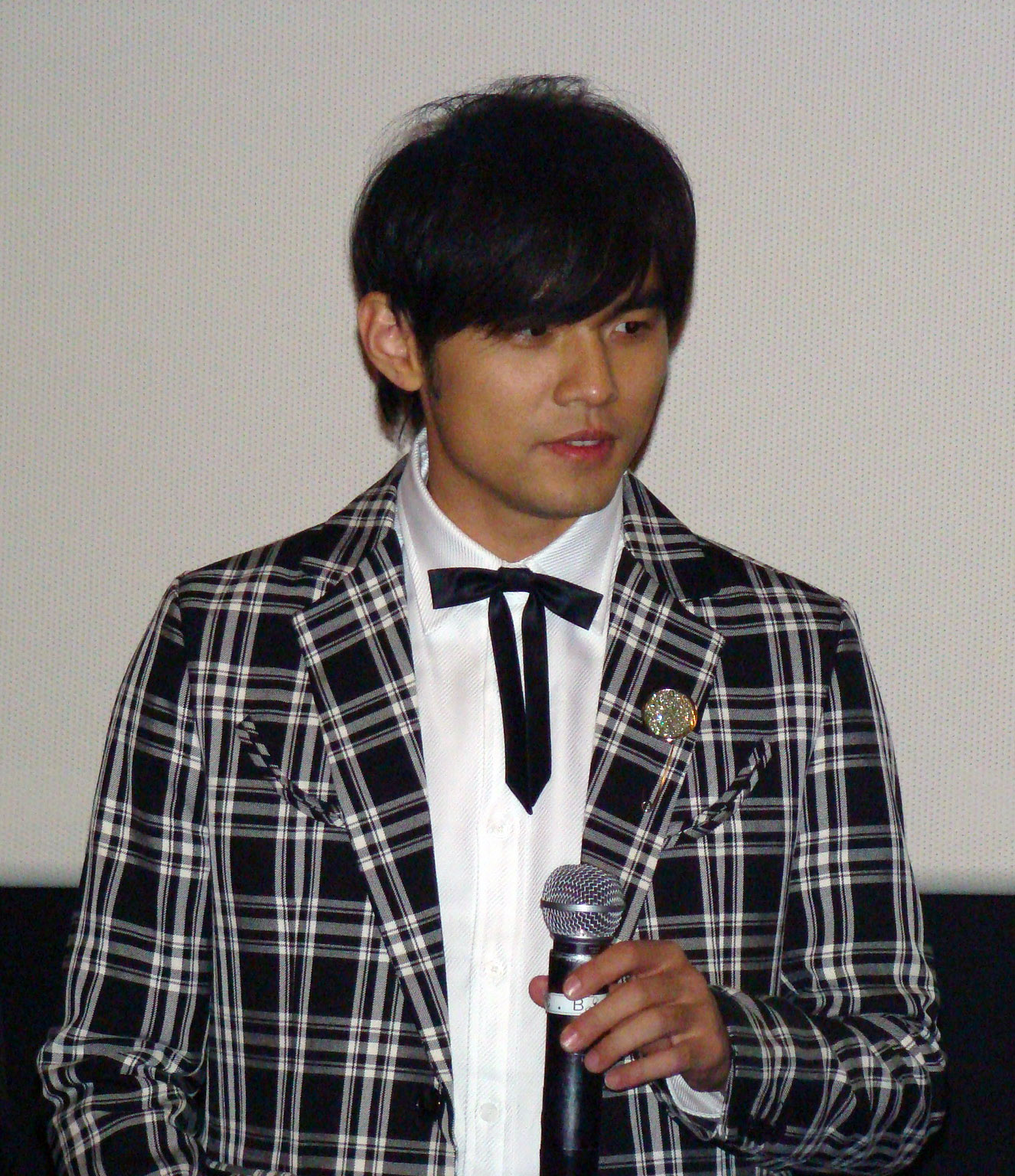
Jay Chou (2015)

=== Coaches ===
Seasons
Coach	1	2	3	4
Harlem Yu				
Na Ying				
Yang Kun				
Liu Huan				
A-mei				
Wang Feng				
Chyi Chin				
Jay Chou				

== Coaches' advisors ==
Season 1

- Team Harlem – Wang Chi-ping
- Team Liu Huan – San Bao
- Team Na Ying – Wang Feng
- Team Yang Kun – Coco Lee

Season 2

- Team A-mei – Aadia's, Leehom Wang
- Team Harlem – Steve Chow, Ella Chen
- Team Na Ying – Wu Tsing-Fong
- Team Wang Feng – Jia Yinan

Season 3

- Team Chyi Chin – Chyi Yu, Karen Mok
- Team Na Ying – Jeff Chang
- Team Wang Feng – Zheng Jun
- Team Yang Kun – Jam Hsiao

Season 4

- Team Harlem – JJ Lin
- Team Jay – A-mei
- Team Na Ying – Li Jian
- Team Wang Feng – G.E.M.

== Series overview ==
- Team Harlem Yu
- Team A-mei
- Team Liu Huan
- Team Wang Feng
- Team Na Ying
- Team Chyi Chin
- Team Yang Kun
- Team Jay Chou

Season	Aired	Winner	Runner-up	Third place	Fourth place	Fifth place	Winning coach	Host	Coaches (seat order)			
Season	Aired	Winner	Runner-up	Third place	Fourth place	Fifth place	Winning coach	Host	1	2	3	4
1	2012	Bruce Liang	Momo Wu	Jike Junyi	Kim Ji-mun	No fifth finalist	Na Ying	Hu Qiaohua	Yang Kun	Na Ying	Liu Huan	Harlem Yu
2	2013	Li Qi	Zhang Hengyuan	Xuan Xuan	Jin Runji	No fifth finalist	A-mei	Hu Qiaohua	Wang Feng	A-mei	Na Ying	Harlem Yu
3	2014	Zhang Bichen	Perhat Khaliq	Ryan Yu	UZ Qin	No fifth finalist	Na Ying	Hu Qiaohua	Chyi Chin	Wang Feng	Na Ying	Yang Kun
4	2015	Zhang Lei	Tifa Chen	Tan Xuanyuan	Beibei	Leon Lee	Na Ying	Hu Qiaohua	Harlem Yu	Wang Feng	Na Ying	Jay Chou

== Season synopses ==
Names in bold type indicate the winner of the season.

=== Season 1 ===
The first season of The Voice of China premiered on 13 July 2012, and concluded on 30 September. The coaching panel consisted of Liu Huan, Na Ying, Yang Kun, and Harlem Yu. Hu Qiaohua as the host.

Each coach was allowed to advance four top to the live shows:

**Team Yang Kun**	**Team Na Ying**	**Team Liu Huan**	**Team Harlem**
Kim Ji-mun	**Bruce Liang**	Jike Junyi	Momo Wu
Guan Zhe	Zhang Wei	Quan Zhendong	Wang Yunyi
Ping An	Duo Liang	Yuan Yawei	Jin Chi
Ding Ding	Zhang Hexuan	Xu Haixing	Da Shan

Four finalists were advanced to the final round. Bruce Liang was announced as the winner of the season, while Momo Wu, Jike Junyi, and Kim Ji-mun placed second, third, and fourth, respectively.

=== Season 2 ===
Season two premiered on 12 July 2013, and concluded on 7 October 2013. The coaching panel was modified, with A-mei and Wang Feng replacing Liu and Yang. This is the only season with two female coaches, which are A-mei and Na Ying. Hu continued appearing as the host of the show.

Each coach was allowed to advance four top to the live shows:

**Team Wang Feng**	**Team A-mei**	**Team Na Ying**	**Team Harlem**
Zhang Hengyuan	**Li Qi**	Xuan Xuan	Jin Runji
Meng Nan	Taskyn	Bella Yao	Su Mengmei
Bi Xia	Liu Yating	Zhu Ke	The Mushroom Brothers
Shan Chongfeng	Wang Tuo	Hou Lei	Ge Hongyu

Four finalists were advanced to the final round. Li Qi was announced as the winner of the season, while Zhang Hengyuan, Xuan Xuan, and Jin Runji placed second, third, and fourth, respectively.

=== Season 3 ===
Season three premiered on 18 July 2014 and concluded on 7 October 2014. Na and Wang return as coaches for their third and second season respectively, along with Yang who returns after a one season break, and Chyi Chin completes the panel as a new coach.

Each coach was allowed to advance four top to the live shows:

**Team Chyi Chin**	**Team Wang Feng**	**Team Na Ying**	**Team Yang Kun**
Qin Yuzi	Perhat Khaliq	**Diamond Zhang**	Ryan Yu
Wei Ran	Wang Kaiqi	Chen Bing	Melody Tan
Liu Shuangshuang	Geng Sihan	Rose Liu	Li Wenqi
Zhang Zhuo Hanwei	Li Qi	Li Jiage	Xu Jianqiu

Four finalists were advanced to the final round. Diamond Zhang was announced as the winner of the season, while Perhat Khaliq, Yu Feng, and Qin Yuzi placed second, third, and fourth, respectively.

=== Season 4 ===
Season four premiered on 17 July 2015 and concluded on 7 October 2015. Na and Wang return as coaches for their fourth and third season respectively, along with Yu who returns after a one season break, and Jay Chou completes the panel as a new coach.

Each coach was allowed to advance four top to the live shows:

**Team Harlem**	**Team Wang Feng**	**Team Na Ying**	**Team Jay**
Tan Xuanyuan	Bei Bei	**Zhang Lei**	Tifa Chen
Ika Zhao	Huang Yong	Sun Bolun	Leon Lee
Lotus Zhang	Zhang Xinxin	Shuhei Nagasawa	Gin Lee
Ma Yinyin	Huang Xiaoyun	Vanatsaya Viseskul	Sharon Kwan

Five finalists were advanced to the final round. Zhang Lei was announced as the winner of the season, while Tifa Chen, Tan Xuanyuan, Bei Bei and Leon Lee placed second, third, fourth and fifth, respectively.
