= The Voice of China season 2 =

The Voice of China
- Season 2
- Hosted by: Hua Shao
- Judges: Wang Feng; A-mei; Na Ying; Harlem Yu
- Winner: Li Qi 李琦
- Winning coach: A-mei
- Runner-up: Zhang Hengyuan 张恒远

Release
- Original network: ZRTG: Zhejiang Television
- Original release: 12 July – 7 October 2013

Season chronology
- ← Previous; Season 1 Next → Season 3

The second season of The Voice of China (Chinese: 中国好声音; pinyin: Zhōngguó Hǎo Shēngyīn) is a Chinese reality talent show that premiered on 12 July 2013, on the Zhejiang Television sponsored by Jiaduobao. Harlem Yu and Na Ying returned as coaches for this season. Yang Kun and Liu Huan both left the show and were replaced by new coaches A-mei and Wang Feng. Li Qi won the Competition making Coach A-mei win her first season and the second female coach win the show (after Na Ying) and became the first new coach to win.

== Teams ==
Colour key

- Winner
- Runner-up
- Third place
- Fourth place
- Eliminated in the Playoffs
- Eliminated in the Knockout rounds
- Artist was stolen by another coach
- Eliminated in the Battle rounds

Coaches	Top 56 artists			
Wang Feng				
Wang Feng	Zhang Hengyuan 张恒远	Meng Nan 孟楠	Bi Xia 毕夏	Shan Chongfeng 单冲峰
Wang Feng	Tian Dan 田丹	Dai Quan 戴荃	Zhang Xinyi 张欣奕	Liu Caixing 刘彩星
Wang Feng	Zhang Yiya 张忆亚	~~Zhao Han 赵晗~~	~~Ni Peng 倪鹏~~	~~Cui Tianqi 崔天琪~~
Wang Feng	Gui Yumeng 桂雨濛	Chang Ying 常颖	Gao Yang 高扬	Simon Chung 钟伟强
A-mei				
A-mei	Li Qi 李琦	Taskyn 塔斯肯	Liu Yating 刘雅婷	Wang Tuo 王拓
A-mei	Kan Liwen 阚立文	Lin Yu-chun 林育群	Liang Junnuo 梁君诺	Li Qiuze 李秋泽
A-mei	Zhang Xin 张新	~~Yeh Ping-huan 叶秉桓~~	~~Zhang Xinyi 张欣奕~~	Uni Yeh 叶玮庭
A-mei	Yao Zheng 姚政	Shennio Lin 林芯仪	Liu Zichen 刘籽辰	Meng Peng 孟鹏
Na Ying				
Na Ying	Xuan Xuan 萱萱	Bella Yao 姚贝娜	Zhu Ke 朱克	Hou Lei 侯磊
Na Ying	Ni Peng 倪鹏	A Light Year 毅光年	Zhao Han 赵晗	Tian Yuan 田园
Na Ying	Zhang Mu 張目	~~Kan Liwen 阚立文~~	~~Lin Yu-chun 林育群~~	Zhou Shiying 周诗颍
Na Ying	Voice Group 声音乐团	Cui Lanhua 崔兰花	Ding Kesen 丁克森	Tang Hongfei 唐荭菲
Harlem Yu				
Harlem Yu	Jin Runji 金润吉	Su Mengmei 苏梦玫	Mushroom Brothers 蘑菇兄弟	Ge Hongyu 葛泓语
Harlem Yu	Wang Hongdi 王洪迪	Yeh Ping-huan 叶秉桓	Deng Gu 邓鼓	Cui Tianqi 崔天琪
Harlem Yu	Wu Mulan 吴木蓝	~~Dai Quan 戴荃~~	Hu Mengzhou 胡梦周	Wang Yu 王宇
Harlem Yu	Sophie Chen 九九	Fei Fei 非非	Zhang Jiaming 張珈銘	Yu Junyi 余俊逸
Note: Italicized names are stolen contestants (names struck through within former teams).

== Blind auditions ==
Color key

✔	Coach hit his or her "I WANT YOU" button
	Artist defaulted to this coach's team
	Artist elected to join this coach's team
	Artist eliminated with no coach pressing his or her "I WANT YOU" button

=== Episode 1 (12 July) ===
Order	Artist	Age	Hometown	Song	Coach's and contestant's choices			
Order	Artist	Age	Hometown	Song	Feng	A-mei	Ying	Harlem
1	Liu Yating 刘雅婷	18	Shenzhen, Guangdong	"I Wanna Rock”	✔	✔	—	✔
2	Li Qi 李琦	23	Xuzhou, Jiangsu	“趁早"	✔	✔	✔	✔
3	Jin Runji 金润吉	32	Yanbian, Jilin	“When a Man Loves a Woman“	✔	✔	✔	✔
4	Bella Yao 姚贝娜	31	Wuhan, Hubei	"也许明天"	✔	✔	✔	✔
5	Ding Kesen 丁克森	28	Wuhan, Hubei	"Bad Boy"	✔	—	✔	—
6	Wang Tuo 王拓	24	Qinghuangdao, Hebei	"玫瑰玫瑰我爱你"	✔	✔	—	✔
7	Zhu Ke 朱克	41	Guiyang, Guizhou	"离不开你"	✔	✔	✔	✔
8	Yeh Ping-huan 叶秉桓	26	Taoyuan, Taiwan	“我爱你"	—	✔	✔	✔

=== Episode 2 (19 July) ===
Order	Artist	Age	Hometown	Song	Coach's and contestant's choices			
Order	Artist	Age	Hometown	Song	Feng	A-mei	Ying	Harlem
1	Wang Yu 王宇	21	Luzhou, Sichuan	"爱我的请举手"	—	✔	—	✔
2	Su Mengmei 苏梦玫	19	Shenzhen, Guangdong	"老实情歌"	—	✔	—	✔
3	Zhang Hengyuan 张恒远	27	Qiandongnan Miao and Dong Autonomous Prefecture, Guizhou	"无法逃脱"	✔	✔	✔	✔
4	Simon Chung 钟伟强	60	Hong Kong	"Rolling in the Deep"	✔	—	✔	✔
5	Xuan Xuan 萱萱	23	Shenyang, Liaoning	"残酷月光"	✔	✔	✔	✔
6	Uni Yeh 叶玮庭	25	Pingtung, Republic of China	"好胆你就来"	—	✔	✔	—
7	Kan Liwen 阚立文	40	Ulanqab, Inner Mongolia	"那些年"	—	✔	✔	✔
8	Zhang Xinyi 张欣奕	25	Tonghua, Jilin	"超级爆"	✔	✔	✔	✔
9	Hou Lei 侯磊	28	Huangshi, Hubei	"味道"	✔	—	✔	✔

=== Episode 3 (26 July) ===
Order	Artist	Age	Hometown	Song	Coach's and contestant's choices			
Order	Artist	Age	Hometown	Song	Feng	A-mei	Ying	Harlem
1	Cui Lanhua 崔兰花	27	Longjing, Jilin	"不见不散" / "故乡之春"	✔	—	✔	—
2	Li Qiuze 李秋泽	30	Tianjin	"跟着感觉走"	✔	✔	✔	✔
3	Chang Ying 常颖	34	Jilin City, Jilin	"Funky Music"	✔	—	✔	—
4	Ji Haixing 纪海星	26	Chengde, Hebei	"狐狸"	—	—	—	—
5	Shan Chongfeng 单冲峰	32	Shenyang, Liaoning	"存在"	✔	✔	—	—
6	Zhang Xin 张新	26	Chongqing	"Fallin"	✔	✔	✔	✔
7	Tian Yuan 田园	27	Harbin, Heilongjiang	"夜太黑"	—	—	✔	—
8	A Light Year 毅光年 (Qi Guang 綦光 & Gao Yi 高毅)	42 / 38	Changchun, Jilin	"怎样"	—	—	✔	✔
9	Cui Tianqi 崔天琪	21	Dongning County, Mudanjiang, Heilongjiang	"Mad World"	✔	✔	—	✔

=== Episode 4 (2 August) ===
Order	Artist	Age	Hometown	Song	Coach's and contestant's choices			
Order	Artist	Age	Hometown	Song	Feng	A-mei	Ying	Harlem
1	Gao Yang 高扬	25	Chaoyang, Liaoning	"无法逃脱"	✔	—	—	—
2	Hu Mengzhou 胡梦周	24	TBA	"我是你的谁"	✔	—	✔	✔
3	Meng Peng 孟鹏	32	Xi'an, Shaanxi	"当我开始偷偷的想你"	—	✔	—	—
4	Fei Fei 非非	29	TBA, Sichuan	"Come Together"	—	—	—	✔
5	Yao Zheng 姚政		Jinan, Shandong	"野花"	—	✔	—	—
6	Liu Zichen 刘籽辰	19	Hengyang, Hunan	"证据"	✔	✔	✔	—
7	Mushroom Brothers 蘑菇兄弟 (Wang Jiacheng 王嘉诚 & Zhang Yanfeng 张燕峰)	28 / 27	Jilin / Shanxi	"睫毛弯弯"	—	✔	—	✔
8	Yu Junyi 余俊逸	22	Zhuzhou, Hunan	"眼泪"	—	—	✔	✔
9	Bi Xia 毕夏	22	Fangzheng County, Harbin, Heilongjiang	"像梦一样自由"	✔	✔	—	✔
10	Ni Peng 倪鹏	22	TBA, Anhui	"掌纹"	✔	—	—	—
11	Wu Mulan 吴木蓝	20	Wuhan, Hubei	"早安晨之美"	—	—	—	✔
12	Meng Nan 孟楠	31	TBA, Heilongjiang	"領悟"	✔	—	✔	✔
13	Zhao Han 赵晗	33	Shenyang, Liaoning	"煎熬"	✔	✔	—	✔
14	Zhou Shiying 周诗颍		Liaoning	"Bad Boy"	—	—	✔	—
15	Tang Hongfei 唐荭菲			"旅行"	—	—	✔	—
16	Taskyn 塔斯肯	34	Urumqi, Xinjiang	"三百六十五里路"	—	—	—	—

=== Episode 5 (9 August) ===
The fifth episode was broadcast on 9 August 2013. It is the last episode of blind auditions. This episode includes second chance contestants for whom none of the coaches had turned around previously.

Order	Artist	Age	Hometown	Song	Coach's and contestant's choices			
Order	Artist	Age	Hometown	Song	Feng	A-mei	Ying	Harlem
1	Gui Yumeng 桂雨濛	25	Fushun, Liaoning	"你不知道的事"	✔	—	—	—
2	Zhang Jiaming 张珈铭	21	Xi'an, Shaanxi	"Make You Feel My Love"	✔	—	—	✔
3	Dai Quan 戴荃	33	Xi'an, Shaanxi	"一见你就笑"	—	—	—	✔
4	Tian Dan 田丹	23	Taiyuan, Shanxi	"煎熬"	✔	—	—	—
5	Zhang Yiya 张忆亚	35	Shanghai	"草帽歌"	✔	✔	—	✔
6	Shennio Lin 林芯仪	27	Taiwan	"看清"	—	✔	—	—
7	Ge Hongyu 葛泓语	21	Xiangyang, Hubei	"Something's Got a Hold on Me"	—	✔	✔	✔
8	Voice Group 声音乐团 (Peng He 彭鹏 & Wen Zhimin 文智敏)	34 / 32	Yibin, Sichuan / Ya'an, Sichuan	"我期待"	—	✔	✔	—
9	Liang Junnuo 梁君诺	22	Zhongshan, Guangdong	"浮夸"	—	✔	—	—
10	Yang Tianrong 杨添茸	28	Kunming, Yunnan	"傻子"	—	—	—	—
11	Lin Yu-chun 林育群	27	Taiwan	"星星"	—	—	✔	—
12	Wang Hongdi 王洪迪	31	Dandong, Liaoning	"爱爱爱爱"	—	✔	✔	✔
13	Liu Caixing 刘彩星	41	Beijing	"橄榄树"	✔	—	✔	—
14	Zhang Mu 张目	25	Chongqing	"Mercy"	Team full	—	✔	✔
Revival round
15	Yan Xing 闫欣	26	Jiamusi, Heilongjiang	"开门见山"	Team full	—	Team full	—
16	Zhang Teng 张腾	25	Meishan, Sichuan	The Big Bang"	Team full	—	Team full	—
17	Sophie Chen 九九	20	Montreal, Canada	"Why"	Team full	—	Team full	✔
18	Wu Yazhu 吴娅珠	31	Guiyang, Guizhou	"那又如何"	Team full	—	Team full	—
19	Deng Gu 邓鼓	20	Chengdu, Sichuan	"I Believe I Can Fly"	Team full	—	Team full	✔
20	Taskyn 塔斯肯	34	Urumqi, Xinjiang	"可爱的一朵玫瑰花"	Team full	✔	Team full	Team full

== The Battles ==
Coaches begin narrowing down the playing field by training the contestants with the help of "trusted advisers." Each episode features battles consisting of pairings from within each team, and each battle concludes with the respective coach eliminating one of the two contestants. 'Steals' were introduced this season, where each coach could steal two contestants from another team when they lost their battle round.

Color key:

Artist won the Battle and advanced to the Knockouts
Artist lost the Battle but was stolen by another coach and advanced to the Knockouts
Artist lost the Battle and was eliminated

Episode	Coach	Order	Winner	Song	Loser	'Steal' result			
Episode	Coach	Order	Winner	Song	Loser	Feng	A-mei	Ying	Harlem
Episode 6 (16 August)	Na Ying	1	Zhang Mu 張目	"一个人跳舞"	Zhou Shiying 周诗颍	—	—	—N/a	—
Episode 6 (16 August)	Na Ying	2	A Light Year 毅光年	"没离开过"	Voice Group 声音乐团	—	—	—N/a	—
Episode 6 (16 August)	Na Ying	3	Xuan Xuan 萱萱	"悬崖"	Cui Lanhua 崔兰花	—	—	—N/a	—
Episode 6 (16 August)	Na Ying	4	Zhu Ke 朱克	"我是真的爱你"	Kan Liwen 阚立文	✔	✔	—N/a	—
Episode 6 (16 August)	Na Ying	5	Hou Lei 侯磊	"当时的月亮"	Ding Kesen 丁克森	—	—	—N/a	—
Episode 6 (16 August)	Na Ying	6	Tian Yuan 田园	"Every Breath You Take"	Tang Hongfei 唐荭菲	—	—	—N/a	—
Episode 6 (16 August)	Na Ying	7	Bella Yao 姚贝娜	"自己" / "Reflection"	Lin Yu-chun 林育群	—	✔	—N/a	—
Episode 7 (23 August)	Wang Feng	1	Zhang Hengyuan 张恒远	"蓝莲花"	Zhao Han 赵晗	—N/a	Team full	✔	✔
Episode 7 (23 August)	Wang Feng	2	Meng Nan 孟楠	"让每个人都心碎"	Gui Yumeng 桂雨濛	—N/a	Team full	—	—
Episode 7 (23 August)	Wang Feng	3	Zhang Yiya 张忆亚	"Can't Take My Eyes Off You"	Chang Ying 常颖	—N/a	Team full	—	—
Episode 7 (23 August)	Wang Feng	4	Shan Chongfeng 单冲峰	"当我想你的时候"	Ni Peng 倪鹏	—N/a	Team full	✔	—
Episode 7 (23 August)	Wang Feng	5	Tian Dan 田丹	"Stronger"	Cui Tianqi 崔天琪	—N/a	Team full	Team full	✔
Episode 7 (23 August)	Wang Feng	6	Liu Caixing 刘彩星	"一块红布"	Gao Yang 高扬	—N/a	Team full	Team full	—
Episode 7 (23 August)	Wang Feng	7	Bi Xia 毕夏	"Hey Jude"	Simon Chung 钟伟强	—N/a	Team full	Team full	—
Episode 8 (30 August)	A-mei	1	Li Qiuze 李秋泽	"最炫民族风"	Uni Yeh 叶玮庭	—	Team full	Team full	—
Episode 8 (30 August)	A-mei	2	Wang Tuo 王拓	"心中的日月"	Yeh Ping-huan 叶秉桓	—	Team full	Team full	✔
Episode 8 (30 August)	A-mei	3	Liang Junnuo 梁君诺	"温柔"	Yao Zheng 姚政	—	Team full	Team full	Team full
Episode 8 (30 August)	A-mei	4	Li Qi 李琦	"一眼瞬间"	Shennio Lin 林芯仪	—	Team full	Team full	Team full
Episode 8 (30 August)	A-mei	5	Liu Yating 刘雅婷	"爱什么稀罕"	Zhang Xinyi 张欣奕	✔	Team full	Team full	Team full
Episode 8 (30 August)	A-mei	6	Zhang Xin 张新	"你在烦恼什么" / "We Are Young"	Liu Zichen 刘籽辰	—	Team full	Team full	Team full
Episode 8 (30 August)	A-mei	7	Taskyn 塔斯肯	"跟往事干杯"	Meng Peng 孟鹏	—	Team full	Team full	Team full
Episode 9 (6 September)	Harlem Yu	1	Wang Hongdi 王洪迪	"看我72变"	Hu Mengzhou 胡梦周	—	Team full	Team full	Team full
Episode 9 (6 September)	Harlem Yu	2	Wu Mulan 吴木蓝	"吻别"	Wang Yu 王宇	—	Team full	Team full	Team full
Episode 9 (6 September)	Harlem Yu	3	Su Mengmei 苏梦玫	"青苹果乐园" / "Lady Marmalade"	Sophie Chen 九九	—	Team full	Team full	Team full
Episode 9 (6 September)	Harlem Yu	4	Jin Runji 金润吉	"秋意浓"	Fei Fei 非非	—	Team full	Team full	Team full
Episode 9 (6 September)	Harlem Yu	5	Ge Hongyu 葛泓语	"Stand by Me"	Zhang Jiaming 张珈铭	—	Team full	Team full	Team full
Episode 9 (6 September)	Harlem Yu	6	Mushroom Brothers 蘑菇兄弟	"妹妹你大胆地往前走"	Dai Quan 戴荃	✔	Team full	Team full	Team full
Episode 9 (6 September)	Harlem Yu	7	Deng Gu 邓鼓	"天黑黑"	Yu Junyi 余俊逸	Team full	Team full	Team full	Team full

== The Knockouts ==
In the Knockouts, each coach split his/her 9 remaining artists into groups of 3. After hearing a group sing their self-selected songs, the group's coach selected the best singer to advance to the Top 4 of his/her team. Each coach also had a one-time use of the "Double" button, which allowed him/her to select two singers from a group.

Color key:

Artist won the Knockout and advanced to the Playoffs
Artist advanced to the Playoffs as the coach's "Double" pick
Artist lost the Knockout and was eliminated

Episode	Order	Coach	Song	Artists		Song
Episode	Order	Coach	Song	Winner	Loser	Song
Episode 10 (13 September)	1	Harlem Yu	"张三的歌"	Mushroom Brothers 蘑菇兄弟	Wang Hongdi 王洪迪	"3-7-20-1"
Episode 10 (13 September)	1	Harlem Yu	"我曾用心爱着你"	Ge Hongyu 葛泓语	Wang Hongdi 王洪迪	"3-7-20-1"
Episode 10 (13 September)	2	A-mei	"Angel"	Taskyn 塔斯肯	Kan Liwen 阚立文	"我愿意"
Episode 10 (13 September)	2	A-mei	"Angel"	Taskyn 塔斯肯	Lin Yu-chun 林育群	"Listen"
Episode 10 (13 September)	3	Wang Feng	"天空"	Meng Nan 孟楠	Tian Dan 田丹	"I Have Nothing"
Episode 10 (13 September)	3	Wang Feng	"天空"	Meng Nan 孟楠	Dai Quan 戴荃	"Nobody"
Episode 10 (13 September)	4	Na Ying	"也许在"	Bella Yao 姚贝娜	Ni Peng 倪鹏	"第一滴泪"
Episode 10 (13 September)	4	Na Ying	"雪侯鸟"	Zhu Ke 朱克	Ni Peng 倪鹏	"第一滴泪"
Episode 10 (13 September)	5	A-mei	"记得"	Li Qi 李琦	Liang Junnuo 梁君诺	"眼色"
Episode 10 (13 September)	5	A-mei	"I Hate Myself for Loving You"	Liu Yating 刘雅婷	Liang Junnuo 梁君诺	"眼色"
Episode 10 (13 September)	6	Harlem Yu	"谁的眼泪在飞"	Jin Runji 金润吉	Yeh Ping-huan 叶秉桓	"夜夜夜夜"
Episode 10 (13 September)	6	Harlem Yu	"谁的眼泪在飞"	Jin Runji 金润吉	Deng Gu 邓鼓	"重来"
Episode 10 (13 September)	7	Na Ying	"懂事"	Hou Lei 侯磊	A Light Year 毅光年	"我们的爱"
Episode 10 (13 September)	7	Na Ying	"懂事"	Hou Lei 侯磊	Zhao Han 赵晗	"She's Gone"
Episode 10 (13 September)	8	Wang Feng	"故乡"	Bi Xia 毕夏	Zhang Xinyi 张欣奕	"燕尾蝶"
Episode 10 (13 September)	8	Wang Feng	"我的路"	Shan Chongfeng 单冲峰	Zhang Xinyi 张欣奕	"燕尾蝶"
Episode 11 (20 September)	1	Na Ying	"Bleeding Love"	Xuan Xuan 萱萱	Tian Yuan 田园	"让她降落"
Episode 11 (20 September)	1	Na Ying	"Bleeding Love"	Xuan Xuan 萱萱	Zhang Mu 張目	"光之翼"
Episode 12 (27 September)	1	A-mei	"牵手"	Wang Tuo 王拓	Li Qiuze 李秋泽	"写一首歌"
Episode 12 (27 September)	1	A-mei	"牵手"	Wang Tuo 王拓	Zhang Xin 张新	"后知后觉"
Episode 13 (30 September)	1	Harlem Yu	"It's a Man's Man's Man's World"	Su Mengmei 苏梦玫	Cui Tianqi 崔天琪	"魔鬼中的天使"
Episode 13 (30 September)	1	Harlem Yu	"It's a Man's Man's Man's World"	Su Mengmei 苏梦玫	Wu Mulan 吴木蓝	"对爱渴望"
Episode 14 (1 October)	1	Wang Feng	"恒星"	Zhang Hengyuan 张恒远	Liu Caixing 刘彩星	"走过"
Episode 14 (1 October)	1	Wang Feng	"恒星"	Zhang Hengyuan 张恒远	Zhang Yiya 张忆亚	"Unchained Melody"

== The Playoffs ==
There are two rounds in this stage. In the first round, the four contestants have their own performances, and the coach decides on the contestant to advance to the final round. The remain artists were voted by the 101 media representatives. The artist with thelowest number of votes will be eliminated. In the second round, the two remaining contestants compete against each other, and the votes are decided by the media as well as the coach, who gives a total of 100 points for both contestants. The contestant with the highest number of votes advances to the next round. In the final round, the two remaining contestants compete against each other, and the votes system is the same with the second round. The contestant with the highest number of votes is the team champion.

Colour key

Artist advanced to the next round
Artist receive "Fast Pass" and directly advanced to the final round via coach's choice
Artist was eliminated

Round 1

Episode	Coach	Order	Artist	Song	Media vote	Result
Episode 11 (20 September)	Na Ying					
Episode 11 (20 September)	Na Ying	1	Zhu Ke 朱克	"离爱不远"	76	Media's vote
Episode 11 (20 September)	Na Ying	2	Bella Yao 姚贝娜	"把握"	85	Media's vote
Episode 11 (20 September)	Na Ying	3	Hou Lei 侯磊	"你的微笑"	66	Eliminated
Episode 11 (20 September)	Na Ying	4	Xuan Xuan 萱萱	"叶子"	—N/a	Ying's choice
Episode 12 (27 September)	A-mei					
Episode 12 (27 September)	A-mei	1	Liu Yating 刘雅婷	"三天三夜"	79	Media's vote
Episode 12 (27 September)	A-mei	2	Taskyn 塔斯肯	"忘了我是谁"	86	Media's vote
Episode 12 (27 September)	A-mei	3	Wang Tuo 王拓	"康定情歌"	62	Eliminated
Episode 12 (27 September)	A-mei	4	Li Qi 李琦	"I'm Yours"	—N/a	A-Mei's choice
Episode 13 (30 September)	Harlem Yu					
Episode 13 (30 September)	Harlem Yu	1	Mushroom Brothers 蘑菇兄弟	"只要你过得比我好" / "No Woman No Cry"	85	Media's vote
Episode 13 (30 September)	Harlem Yu	2	Su Mengmei 苏梦玫	"沙滩"	72	Media's vote
Episode 13 (30 September)	Harlem Yu	3	Ge Hongyu 葛泓语	"只爱高跟鞋" / "Walking By Myself"	70	Eliminated
Episode 13 (30 September)	Harlem Yu	4	Jin Runji 金润吉	"后来"	—N/a	Harlem's choice
Episode 14 (1 October)	Wang Feng					
Episode 14 (1 October)	Wang Feng	1	Bi Xia 毕夏	"生如夏花"	86	Media's vote
Episode 14 (1 October)	Wang Feng	2	Shan Chongfeng 单冲峰	"地心"	68	Eliminated
Episode 14 (1 October)	Wang Feng	3	Meng Nan 孟楠	"爱"	76	Media's vote
Episode 14 (1 October)	Wang Feng	4	Zhang Hengyuan 张恒远	"咿呦"	—N/a	Feng's choice

Round 2

Episode	Coach	Order	Artist	Song	Coach points	Media points	Total points	Result
Episode 11 (20 September)	Na Ying							
Episode 11 (20 September)	Na Ying	1	Zhu Ke 朱克	"爱的箴言"	48	48	96	Eliminated
Episode 11 (20 September)	Na Ying	2	Bella Yao 姚贝娜	"Dear Friend"	52	53	105	Advanced
Episode 12 (27 September)	A-mei							
Episode 12 (27 September)	A-mei	1	Liu Yating 刘雅婷	"What's Up?"	40	38	78	Eliminated
Episode 12 (27 September)	A-mei	2	Taskyn 塔斯肯	"Take Me Home, Country Roads"	60	63	123	Advanced
Episode 13 (30 September)	Harlem Yu							
Episode 13 (30 September)	Harlem Yu	1	Mushroom Brothers 蘑菇兄弟	"光阴的故事"	45	54	99	Eliminated
Episode 13 (30 September)	Harlem Yu	2	Su Mengmei 苏梦玫	"看见什么吃什么"	55	47	102	Advanced
Episode 14 (1 October)	Wang Feng							
Episode 14 (1 October)	Wang Feng	1	Bia Xia	"Knockin' on Heaven's Door"	50	30	80	Eliminated
Episode 14 (1 October)	Wang Feng	2	Meng Nan 孟楠	"Saving All My Love for You"	50	71	121	Advanced

Round 3

Episode	Coach	Order	Artist	Song	Coach points	Media points	Total points	Result
Episode 11 (20 September)	Na Ying							
Episode 11 (20 September)	Na Ying	1	Xuan Xuan 萱萱	"我是不是你最疼爱的人"	52	75	127	Advanced
Episode 11 (20 September)	Na Ying	2	Bella Yao 姚贝娜	"All By Myself"	48	26	74	Eliminated
Episode 12 (27 September)	A-mei							
Episode 12 (27 September)	A-mei	1	Li Qi 李琦	"他不爱我"	60	67	127	Advanced
Episode 12 (27 September)	A-mei	2	Taskyn 塔斯肯	"翅膀之歌"	40	34	74	Eliminated
Episode 13 (30 September)	Harlem Yu							
Episode 13 (30 September)	Harlem Yu	1	Jin Runji 金润吉	"You Raise Me Up"	53	58	111	Advanced
Episode 13 (30 September)	Harlem Yu	2	Su Mengmei 苏梦玫	"The Best"	48	43	91	Eliminated
Episode 13 (30 September)	Harlem Yu	Note: Harlem Yu accidentally used 101 points instead of 100, but it didn't affect the overall result.						
Episode 14 (1 October)	Wang Feng							
Episode 14 (1 October)	Wang Feng	1	Zhang Hengyuan 张恒远	"青春"	59	60	119	Advanced
Episode 14 (1 October)	Wang Feng	2	Meng Nan 孟楠	"白月光"	41	41	82	Eliminated

Non-competition performances
Order	Performers	Song
11.1	Na Ying & her team (Bella Yao 姚贝娜, Hou Lei 侯磊, Xuan Xuan 萱萱, Zhu Ke 朱克)	"妥协之歌"
12.1	A-mei & her team (Li Qi 李琦, Liu Yating 刘雅婷, Taskyn 塔斯肯, Wang Tuo 王拓)	"Are You Ready"
13.1	Harlem Yu & his team (Ge Hongyu 葛泓语, Jin Runji 金润吉, Mushroom Brothers 蘑菇兄弟, Su Mengmei 苏梦玫)	"我要给你"
14.1	Wang Feng & his team (Bi Xia 毕夏, Shan Chongfeng 单冲峰, Meng Nan 孟楠, Zhang Hengyuan 张恒远)	"一起摇摆"

== Final Concert - Winner Announced (Episode 15) ==
The season finale aired on Monday, October 7, 2013, which took place at Baoshan Stadium in Shanghai, China. Li Qi was named the winner.

Coach	Artist	Order	First song (with coach)	Order	Second song	Order	Third song	Order	Fourth song	Media points	Public points	Result
A-mei	Li Qi 李琦	1	"后知后觉"	5	"自由"	9	"怎么说我不爱你"	12	"真实"	68	53%	Winner
Wang Feng	Zhang Hengyuan 张恒远	2	"如果风不再吹"	6	"夜空中最亮的星"	N/A (given bye)		11	"追梦赤子心"	33	47%	Runner-up
Na Ying	Xuan Xuan 萱萱	3	"天生不完美"	7	"Melody"	10	"Footprints in the Sand"	N/A (already eliminated)				Third place
Harlem Yu	Jin Runji 金润吉	4	"关不掉的月光"	8	"遇见"	N/A (already eliminated)						Fourth place

Non-competition performances
Order	Performers	Song
15.1	Top 16	"Descendants of the Dragon 龙的传人"
15.2	Zhang Wei	"让世界为你转身"
15.3	Li Daimo & Li Yundi	"兄弟简单的事"
15.4	Momo Wu	"我相信"

== Ratings ==
=== CSM46 Ratings ===
Episode		Original airdate	Production	Time slot (UTC+8)	Rating	Share	Ranking	Source
1	"The Blind Auditions Premiere"	12 July 2013	201	Friday 9:10 PM	3.516	11.32%	1	
2	"The Blind Auditions, Part 2"	19 July 2013	202	Friday 9:10 PM	4.062	12.69%	1	
3	"The Blind Auditions, Part 3"	26 July 2013	203	Friday 9:10 PM	4.633	13.94%	1	
4	"The Blind Auditions, Part 4"	2 August 2013	204	Friday 9:10 PM	4.885	14.66%	1	
5	"The Blind Auditions, Part 5"	9 August 2013	205	Friday 9:10 PM	5.031	15.44%	1	
6	"The Battle Rounds Premiere"	16 August 2013	206	Friday 9:10 PM	5.080	15.55%	1	
7	"The Battles, Part 2"	23 August 2013	207	Friday 9:10 PM	5.103	15.45%	1	
8	"The Battles, Part 3"	30 August 2013	208	Friday 9:10 PM	5.233	15.76%	1	
9	"The Battles, Part 4"	6 September 2013	209	Friday 9:10 PM	4.934	15.08%	1	
10	"The Knockouts"	13 September 2013	210	Friday 9:10 PM	4.845	15.03%	1	
11	"The Playoffs Premiere"	20 September 2013	211	Friday 9:10 PM	4.612	14.56%	1	
12	"The Playoffs, Part 2"	27 September 2013	212	Friday 9:10 PM	4.352	13.99%	1	
13	"The Playoffs, Part 3"	30 September 2013	213	Monday 9:23 PM	3.441	10.93%	1	
14	"The Playoffs, Part 4"	1 October 2013	214	Tuesday 9:24 PM	3.876	12.99%	1	
15	"Live Finale"	7 October 2013	215	Monday 8:23 PM	5.174	14.84%	1	

The data determined by CSM.

== International broadcast ==
- Taiwan: CTi Variety
- Hong Kong: TVB Good Show
