= Harlem Yu =

- 庾澄慶
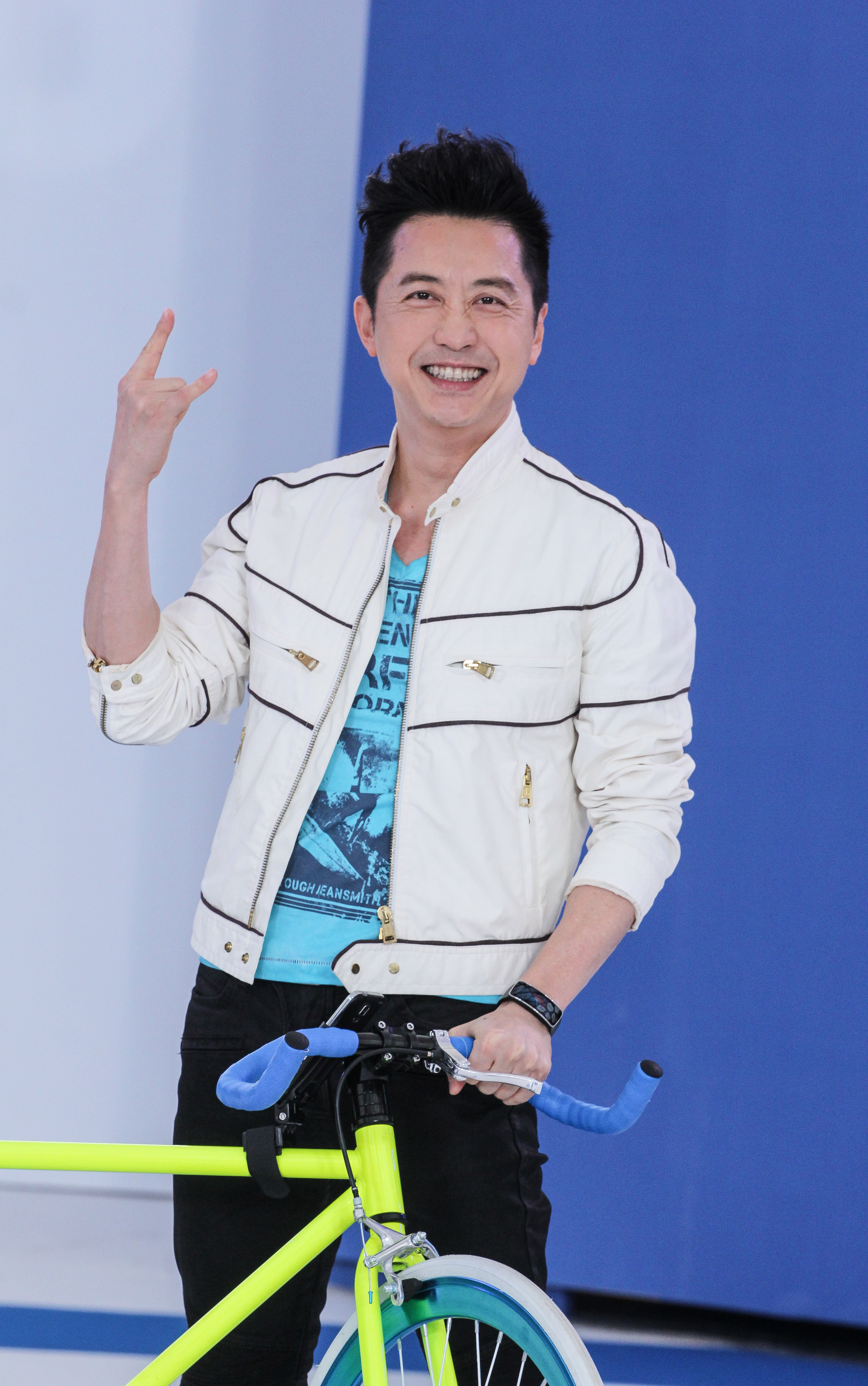
- Harlem Yu at Taiwan samsung Galaxy S5 product launch, 19 March 2014
- Born: 28 July 1961 (age 65); Taipei, Taiwan
- Occupations: Singer, songwriter, rapper, television host, businessman
- Years active: 1986–present
- Spouses: Annie Yi (m. 2000; div. 2009) Jinny Chang (m. 2016)
- Children: 3
- Awards: Golden Melody Awards – Best Mandarin Male Artist; 2002 Tsunami TVB Anniversary Awards – Best Presenter; 2007 Foodie 2 Shoes

Chinese name
- Traditional Chinese: 庾澄慶
- Simplified Chinese: 庾澄庆
Transcriptions
Standard Mandarin
- Hanyu Pinyin: Yǔ Chéngqìng
Southern Min
- Hokkien POJ: Jú Têng-khèng
- Musical career
- Genres: Mandopop, hip hop, R&B
- Labels: Linfair Records (1986–1995; 2008–present); Sony Music Taiwan (1995–2007)

Harlem Yu (traditional Chinese: 庾澄慶; simplified Chinese: 庾澄庆; pinyin: Yǔ Chéngqìng; Pe̍h-ōe-jī: Jú Têng-khèng; born 28 July 1961) is a Taiwanese singer-songwriter, television host and businessman. He has been hosting television shows in Taiwan since 1994 and in China since 2011, and served as a coach for three seasons of The Voice of China and three seasons of Sing! China.

== Career ==
Yu's debut album, The Sorrowful Singer, was released in 1986, and became known as one of the first artists in the Mandopop music industry to experiment with R&B and rap. He is also known for singing the theme song, Qing Fei De Yi (情非得已), for the 2001 television drama, Meteor Garden. He made a cameo in both the original version and the 2018 remake, performing Qing Fei De Yi.

Apart from music, Yu also hosts television variety shows. He won the Golden Bell Award for Best Variety Show Host twice for his work on Super Sunday and the Golden Bell Award for Best Educational and Reality Show Host for Let's Ride, Harlem's Squad. He has also hosted three Golden Melody Awards ceremonies.

As a businessman, his investments include: mega force studio, AoBa Taiwanese cuisine restaurant, Legacy Taipei (Livehouse).

== Discography ==
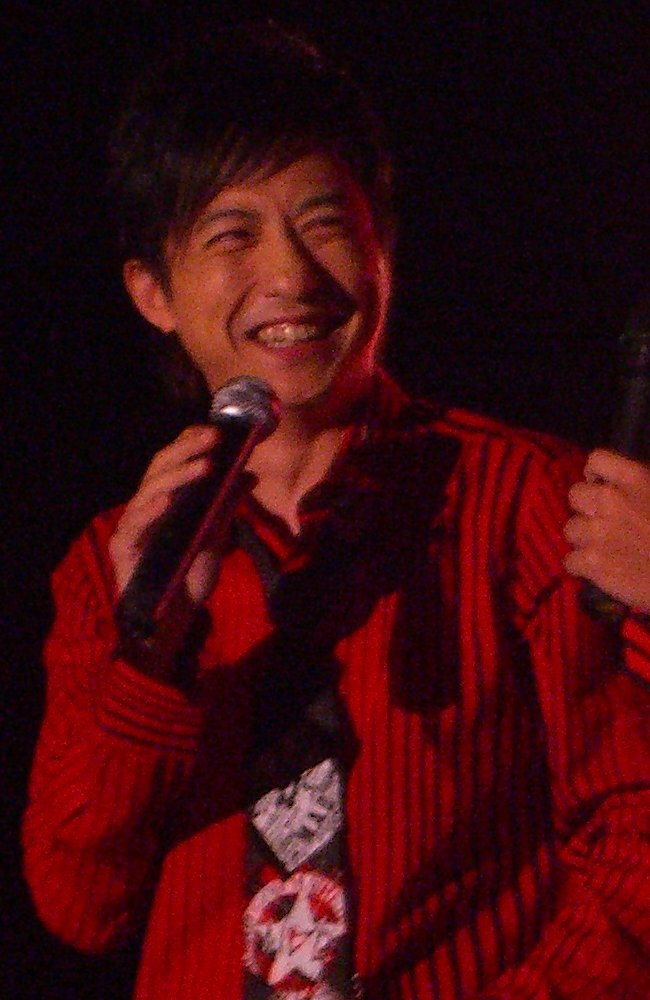
Harlem Yu at Taiwan Shih Hsin University's 50th anniversary celebration concert, 14 October 2006

=== Studio albums ===
#	English title	Original title	Released date	Label
1st	Sad Singer	傷心歌手	12 December 1986	Linfair Records
2nd	I Know I Grow Up Already	我知道我已經長大	6 October 1987	Linfair Records
3rd	Missed Love	錯過的愛	2 August 1988	Linfair Records
4th	Give You All My Love	讓我一次愛個夠	20 July 1989	Linfair Records
5th	Righting All The Wrong	改變所有的錯	13 April 1990	Linfair Records
6th	I Can't Control Myself	管不住自己	6 July 1991	Linfair Records
7th	True Love Song	老實情歌	9 September 1993	Linfair Records
8th	Get Close	靠近	9 June 1995	Sony Music Taiwan
9th	Open Your Window	請開窗	23 September 1996	Sony Music Taiwan
10th	Just For You	只有為你	25 November 1997	Sony Music Taiwan
11th	Most Familiar	我最熟悉	4 May 1999	Sony Music Taiwan
12th	Tidal Wave	海嘯	18 May 2001	Sony Music Taiwan
13th	Harlem's Heaven	哈林天堂	6 June 2003	Sony Music Taiwan
14th	Can't Quit	戒不掉	14 July 2006	Sony BMG Music Taiwan
15th	The Moonlight That Can't Be Turned Off	關不掉的月光	3 May 2013	Linfair Records

=== Extended plays ===
Original title	Released date	Label
報告班長	1 June 1987	Linfair Records
別走	19 August 1998	Sony Music Taiwan

=== Band albums ===
English title	Original title	Released date	Label
Top Gang	頂尖拍檔	30 April 1992	Linfair Records

=== Compilations ===
English title	Original title	Released date	Label
	想念妳精選	August 1990	PolyGram Records
Funky Don't Go	咪走	June 1998	Sony Music Taiwan
Harlem No.1 Collection	哈林NO.1精選輯	19 July 1998	Sony Music Taiwan
Lost & Found	失物招領 愛你在庾式情歌蔓延時	13 November 2002	Linfair Records
Harlem Yu New + Best Selection (3CD)	到死都要18歲 新歌+精選 (3CD)	18 December 2009	Linfair Records

=== Cover albums ===
English title	Original title	Released date	Label
Harlem Music Station	哈林音樂電台	2 October 1992	Sony Music Taiwan
Harlem Night Club	哈林夜總會	18 December 1995	Linfair Records
Harlem Music Television	哈林音樂頻道	14 May 1997	Sony Music Taiwan
Hi Baby	哈寶寶我來了	1 April 1998	Sony Music Taiwan
Hollywood	哈林音樂電影院 哈LLYWOOD	5 January 2000	Sony Music Taiwan
Harlem Night Club - Lady's Night	哈林夜總會 - Lady's Night	12 December 2008	Linfair Records

=== Soundtrack contributions ===
- 2001 Meteor Garden: "情非得已" (pinyin: Qíng Fēi Dé Yǐ) - opening theme song
- 2005 Hong Kong Disneyland: The Grand Opening Celebration Album - "Can You Feel the Love Tonight" (from The Lion King) (Mandarin)
- 2006 Silence: "靜靜的" (Silently) - opening theme song
- 2018 Meteor Garden 2018: "情非得已" (Qíng Fēi Dé Yǐ)

== Filmography ==
=== Television series ===
Year	English title	Original title	Role	Network
1997	TVBS-G Music Love Story	TVBS-G 音樂愛情故事	Radio DJ	TVBS
1998	TVBS-G Music Love Story	TVBS-G 音樂愛情故事	Musician	TVBS
2001	Meteor Garden	流星花園	Cameo	Chinese Television System (CTS)
2004	Starry Night	愛在星光燦爛時	Himself	Chinese Television System (CTS)
2007	Corner With Love	轉角＊遇到愛	Lian Sheng Quan	China Television (CTV)
2018	Meteor Garden	流星花园	Cameo	Hunan Television

=== Film ===
Year	English title	Original title	Role	Notes
1989	Finding the Way	細雨春風		
1995	Toy Story	—N/a	Sheriff Woody	Taiwanese release, voice
1999	Toy Story 2	—N/a	Sheriff Woody	Taiwanese release, voice
2000	Dragon Heat	龍火		
2008	Butterfly Lovers	武俠梁祝	Uncle Caotou	
2010	Toy Story 3	—N/a	Sheriff Woody	Taiwanese release, voice
2011	Mr. and Mrs. Single	隱婚男女	Tony	
2011	Starry Starry Night	星空	Mei's father	
2024	Pigsy	八戒	Wukong	Voice

=== TV hosting ===
Year	Original title	English title	Network
18 September 1994 – 11 February 1996	超級星期天	Super Sunday	Taiwan Television (TTV)
3 March 1996 – 30 March 2003	超級星期天	Super Sunday	Chinese Television System (CTS)
20 October 2001 – 22 December 2001	周末三寶FUN		Taiwan Television (TTV)
24 October 2001 – 29 May 2002	音樂大不同		Much TV
4 October 2004 – 7 June 2005	明星克漏字		STAR Chinese Channel
9 April 2006 – 2 July 2006	週日狂熱夜		Public Television Service (PTS)
17 April 2006 – 31 July 2007	哈林國民學校	Harlem's School	Taiwan Television (TTV)
28 August – 24 September 2007	味分高下	Foodie 2 Shoes	Television Broadcasts (TVB)
10 May 2008 – 11 August 2012	百萬大歌星	Million Singer	Taiwan Television (TTV)
2 February 2009 – 13 March 2009	耳分高下	Boom Boom Ba	Television Broadcasts (TVB)
22 June 2009 – 1 October 2009	哈林老師好	Hello Harlem	ON TV (緯來綜合台)
24 July 2010 – 28 January 2011	我猜我猜我猜猜猜	Guess Guess Guess	China Television (CTV)
9 January 2011	給力星期天	Gelivable Sunday	Hunan Broadcasting System (HBS)
23 July 2011 – 21 January 2012	給你哈音樂	Harlem Music	CTi Entertainment(CTi)
13 July 2012 – 30 September 2012	中國好聲音 (第一季)	The Voice of China (season 1)	Zhejiang Television
18 August 2012– present	王子的約會	Take Me Out	Taiwan Television (TTV) produced by RTL Group
30 March 2013 – 13 July 2013	超級歌喉讚	I Wanna Singin' For You	China Television (CTV)
12 July 2013 – 29 September 2013	中國好聲音 (第二季)	The Voice of China (season 2)	Zhejiang Television
April 2014 - May 2014	嗨！2014	Hi! 2014	CCTV-1
4 November 2014 – 23 December 2014	Hi歌		Tencent Variety Channel
31 October 2014 – 30 December 2014	中国正在听		CCTV - Variety Channel
15 July 2015 – 7 October 2015	中国好声音 (第四季)	The Voice of China (season 4)	Zhejiang Television
June 2016 - September 2016	蓋世英雄	Heroes of Earth	Jiangsu Television
15 July 2016 – 7 October 2016	中国新歌聲	Sing! China	Zhejiang Television

== Published works ==
Title	Publisher	Released date	ISBN
哈林SUPER手冊1 請開窗	皇冠叢書	10 October 1996	ISBN 957-33-1347-2
哈林SUPER手冊2 哈林音樂頻道	皇冠叢書	10 June 1997	ISBN 957-33-1429-0

== Awards and nominations ==
Year	Award	Category	Nominated work	Result
1990	1990 RTHK Top 10 Gold Songs Awards	Most Promising Artist	—N/a	Won
1996	Billboard Music Awards	Outstanding Singer-Songwriter in Asia	—N/a	Won
1997	Golden Bell Awards	Best Variety Programme	Super Sunday	Won
1998	9th Golden Melody Awards	Golden Melody Award for Best Male Vocalist – Mandarin	Just for You	Nominated
1999	TVB8 Awards	Best Producer	"Wo Zui Yao Bai"	Won
1999	TVB8 Awards	Best Music Video	"Wo Zui Yao Bai"	Won
1999	10th Golden Melody Awards	Golden Melody Award for Best Male Vocalist – Mandarin	Harlem No.1	Nominated
2000	Golden Bell Awards	Best Host in a Variety Programme	Super Sunday	Won
2000	11th Golden Melody Awards	Golden Melody Award for Best Male Vocalist – Mandarin	Most Familiar	Nominated
2001	Golden Bell Awards	Best Host in a Variety Programme	Super Sunday	Won
2001	12th Golden Melody Awards	Golden Melody Award for Best Male Vocalist – Mandarin	Hollywood	Nominated
2002	13th Golden Melody Awards	Best Male Vocalist – Mandarin	Tidal Wave	Won
2007	HITO Radio Music Awards	Achievement Award	—N/a	Won
