= Perhat Khaliq =

Chinese Uyghur pop-rock composer and musician

- Born: July 24, 1982 (age 44); Ürümqi, Xinjiang, China
- Occupations: Singer-songwriter, musician

Perhat Khaliq (Uyghur: پەرھات خالىق, romanized: Perhat Xaliq; Chinese: 帕尔哈提·哈力克; pinyin: Pà'ěrhātí·Hālìkè; born July 24, 1982), also known as Perhat, is a Uyghur pop-rock composer and musician best known for his performances on the Chinese reality talent show The Voice of China in 2014.

== Personal life ==
Perhat Khaliq grew up in an industrial area in Ürümqi, Xinjiang Uyghur Autonomous Region.

== Career ==
In 2006, Perhat founded his current band Qetiq with his wife (Pazilet Tursun, a singer), cousin and some friends. He earned a living performing with his band in pubs in Ürümqi. In 2014, his participation in the reality show The Voice of China attracted much public attention.

The band released their first Uyghur language album Qetiq: Rock from Taklamakan Desert recorded during their trip to Europe at Morgenland Festival Osnabrück, 2010. A documentary film was made, "Qetiq, Rock'n Urumchi" by Mukaddas Mijit (55' 2013) about their first historical concert in Morgenland Festival Osnabrück

In 2015, he and his band Qetiq embarked on their first China tour performing in 22 major cities in 40 days. In May 2015, he received the prestigious Dutch's Prince Claus Awards for "breathing new life into traditional Uyghur forms".

At the 2015 Prince Claus Awards, Ong Keng Sen (one of the judges and who is director of Singapore International Festival of Arts (SIFA)), was very impressed with his performances and invited Perhat to perform in Singapore. He and his band gave a stellar performance at the 2016 SIFA pre-festival O.P.E.N. (Open. Participate. Engage. Negotiate.) on June 23, 2016, which is also their Asian premiere outside of China.

== Discography ==
Album information	Track listing
Qetiq: Rock from Taklamakan Desert: EP; Released: July 2, 2013; Label: Dreyer-Gaido musikproduktionen	Track listing: 1. Dolan Muqam; 2. Qara Jorgha; 3. Aq Bayan; 4. Ishchi; 5. Tughulghan Kunum; 6. Qizdar; 7. Tarim; 8. Shukri Didim; 9. Zeytunkhan-Nazirkom
Asman: Live in Geneva: Released: August 1, 2016; Label: 星外星音樂	Track listing: 1. Dolan Muqam; 2. Shükri Didim; 3. Asman; 4. Qara qara qaghilar 5. Tughulghan Künüm; 6. Atush Naxshisi; 7. Yar Barmu; 8. Yaru; 9. Anijan; 10. Kenges; 11. Küy <Korghul>; 12. Qara Jorgha

== See also ==
- Ablajan Awut Ayup
- Arken Abdulla
