= Na Ying =

Chinese singer

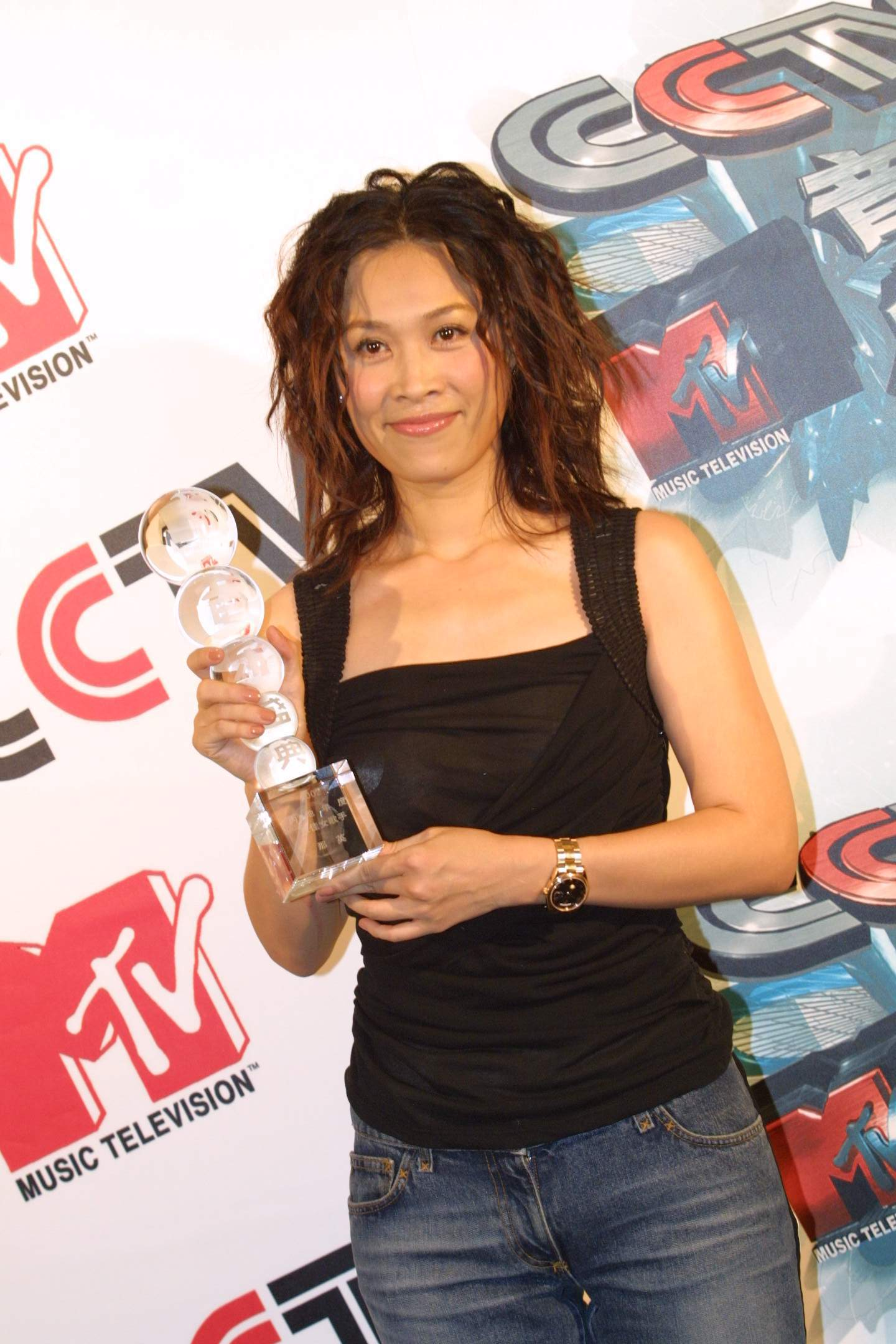
- Na Ying in 2002
- Born: Shenyang, Liaoning, China
- Occupation: Singer
- Years active: 1988–present
- Spouses: Gao Feng (m. 2004; div. 2005) Meng Tong (m. 2006)
- Children: 2
- Awards: Golden Melody Awards – Best Female Mandarin Artist; 2001 Romantic Bitterness MTV Asia Awards – Favourite Artist, Mainland China; 2002

Chinese name
- Chinese: 那英
Transcriptions
Standard Mandarin
- Hanyu Pinyin: Nā Yīng
- Musical career
- Also known as: Natasha Na
- Origin: China
- Genres: Mandopop, Chinese Romantic Music

Na Ying is a Chinese singer. Rising to fame in the late 1980s, Na signed with Linfair Records in 1993, becoming one of the first singers from mainland China to join a Taiwanese label and subsequently gaining popularity across Greater China. In 2001, she became the first and only mainland Chinese singer to win the Best Mandarin Female Singer at the Golden Melody Awards for her song Sad and Romantic from the eponymous album (2000). Since the 2010s, she has become a staple of music shows, serving as a coach for eight seasons of The Voice of China from 2012 to 2021, and participating in Season 1 and 4 of Mask Singer (China) (2016; 2019); Our Song (2019); Season 2 and 3 of Sisters Who Make Waves (2021–2022), where she won the championship in Season 2; Infinity and Beyond 2023; and Singer 2024, where she won the championship.

== Biography ==
=== Early career ===
Na was born in Shenyang, Liaoning of ethnic Manchu parents. She is of Manchu descent. She became a member of the Liaoning Juvenile Broadcasting Chorus in 1979, and the Shenyang Singing and Dancing Troupe in 1983. In 1983, Na won a national singing contest, where she was noticed by composer and later mentor Gu Jianfen (谷建芬).

After recording demos for singers such as Mao Amin and releasing cover albums, mostly featuring songs by Su Rui, Na had her first hit song "Shan Gougou" (山沟沟), followed by "Shan Bu Zhuan Shui Zhuan" (山不转水转). In 1991, she released her first album entitled "A single woman like me" (像我这样的单身女子), which had a moderate reception. Two years later, in 1993, she released the album "I Hope My Dreams Come True" (但愿好梦都成真) which was not popular either.

=== Success ===
She released her first major album Dreaming With You, in 1994. Following the release of that album, she released several additional albums, becoming one of the most popular Mandarin-language artists of Mainland China.

At the 1998 Spring Festival Gala show hosted by CCTV, Na sang a duet "Meet in '98" (相約一九九八) with Faye Wong. Wong had already achieved fame in Hong Kong and elsewhere, but the performance with Na brought her to superstar status in China itself.

Na had a relationship with Chinese footballer Gao Feng and a son by him, they separated in 2005. She married Meng Tong in 2006, and they had a daughter in 2007.

Although she devoted time to her family and children from 2002 to 2009, she never quit singing, and had a prominent role at the closing ceremony of the Beijing 2008 Summer Olympics.

At the close of 2009 she performed the concert "20 Years of Na", a retrospective of her stage career, at the Capital Gymnasium. Although her 2009 single "The Journey of Love" topped the charts wherever it was released, her early song "Follow Your Instinct" remains her favourite.

After a hiatus of nearly nine years, Na returned to the music scene in 2011, releasing a new album called So... What?. The album reached the number one position on both the mainland China and Taiwan album charts.

=== The Voice of China ===
In 2012, Na became a coach and judge on the first season of the popular television singing show The Voice of China, along with Yang Kun, Liu Huan and Yu Chengqing. She returned to the judges panel in 2013 for the second season of The Voice of China, along with Wang Feng, Zhang Hui-mei and Yu Chengqing. Na continued being a judge on the third and fourth season of that show with Wang Feng, Yang Kun, Jay Chou and Yu Chengqing.

In 2016, Na appeared on the first season of the show Sing! China, along with Wang Feng, Zhou Jielun, and Yu Chengqing. In 2017, she was also on the second season of the show along with fellow judges Zhou Jielun, Eason Chan, and Liu Huan.

On 11 October 2017, Na announced through a letter that she would be resigning as a coach from Sing! China.

=== Other projects ===
In 2017, she released NASING, an EP featuring three songs that were used in film soundtracks.

In 2018, Na Ying and Faye Wong performed together on the CCTV new year's gala singing the song "Lunar year".

In early 2021, Na participated in a popular Chinese reality TV show called Sisters Who Make Waves. After winning first place during the second season, she was invited back during the third season as one of the two group captains in Spring 2022.

In 2023, Na Ying served as the resident singer in "The Everlasting Sound·Treasure Island Season", and a group of young singers from both sides of the Taiwan Strait participated in the form of "flight" to perform Taiwanese songs of different eras for the audience.

== Discography ==
The following are a selection of her albums released from 1991 to 2015.

=== Studio albums ===
- 1991: 像我这样的单身女子 (A single woman like me)
- 1993: 但愿好梦都成真 (I hope my dreams come true)
- 1994: 為你朝思暮想 Wèi nǐ zhāo sī mù xiǎng (Dreaming with you)
- 1995: 白天不懂夜的黑 Bái tiān bù dǒng yè de hēi (The day doesn't know the night)
- 1998: 征服 Zhēng fú (Conquering)
- 1999: 乾脆 Gān cuì (Totally)
- 2000: 心酸的浪漫 Xīn suān de làng màn (Sad and romantic)
- 2001: 我不是天使 Wǒ bù shì tiān shǐ (I'm not an angel)
- 2002: 如今... Rújīn... (Nowadays)
- 2011: 那又怎樣... Nà yòu zěn yàng... (So what?)
- 2015: 默... Mò... (Sadness)
- 2016: NASING (EP)

=== Compilations ===
- 2001: Na Ying selected hits

=== Live albums ===
- 2001: Na Ying live in concert

Awards and achievements
Top Chinese Music Chart Awards
Preceded by First Year Awarded	Favorite Female Artist, mainland China; 2002	Succeeded by Na Ying
Preceded by Na Ying	Favorite Female Artist, mainland China; 2003	Succeeded by Na Ying
Preceded by Chen Lin	Best Female Artist, mainland China; 2003	Succeeded by Han Hong
Preceded by Na Ying	Favorite Female Artist, mainland China; 2004	Succeeded by Zhao Wei
