= Chyi Chin =

Taiwanese singer and songwriter

- Born: 12 January 1960 (age 66); Taichung, Taiwan
- Occupations: Singer; songwriter; actor
- Years active: 1981–2002, 2010–present
- Spouse: Sun Liya (m. 2010)
- Partner: Joey Wong (1987–1993; 1995–2002)
- Children: 3
- Awards: Golden Melody Awards – Best Male Mandarin Artist; 1997
- Musical career
- Origin: Taiwan
- Genres: Mandopop, Taiwanese pop, rock, folk, jazz, blues
- Instruments: Vocals, guitar, bass guitar, harmonica
- Labels: Reds Music Studio, Sony Music

Chinese name
- Traditional Chinese: 齊秦
Transcriptions
Standard Mandarin
- Hanyu Pinyin: Qí Qín
Hakka
- Romanization: Chhè Chhìn or Chhì Chhìn
Southern Min
- Hokkien POJ: Chôe Chîn

Chyi Chin (Chinese: 齊秦; pinyin: Qí Qín; born 12 January 1960) is a Taiwanese singer, songwriter and actor.

== Early life ==
Chyi Chin was born in Taichung, Taiwan. When he was young, his father had a strict daily regimen of study that started at 5 am. His studies varied from English music and literature to classical Chinese literature and Tang dynasty poetry. Chyi, however, did not enjoy reading. When he became a teenager, his father's push for education caused a strain on their relationship. Chyi joined a local gang in defiance of his father, and landed in jail for three years as a result. During his incarceration, Chyi learned to be introspective and kept a diary. While in prison, he earned an appreciation for music. The prison had a guitar in the courtyard for the "juvenile delinquents" recreation, and Chyi taught himself how to play on it.

After his release, Chyi and his older sister, Chyi Yu, often sang together at home, but his father again placed him in home detention for a year. Chyi Yu, by then already a famous singer, gave Chyi his start in the field. Whenever she performed "The Olive Tree" (橄欖樹), she would tell the audience that her brother could sing it even better than she could. Following a duet in Hong Kong with her brother, she gave him an expensive guitar, which he practiced with every day, and after their father died from cancer, Chyi did not want to inherit any property, but kept all the books he had to read.

== Career ==
Chyi started his formal career in 1981 with his first album titled See Her Slip Away Again (又見溜溜的她), which made him quite popular later that year. He released the smash hit "Wolf" in 1985 and opened up Rainbow Studios. In 1987, the album Winter Rain (冬雨) was released, and contained the hit Around Winter (大约在冬季), which would later be made into a film.

Chyi groups his music career into two periods: the "wolf period" (pre-1992) and the "deer period" (after he converted to Buddhism in 1992). He attributes the titles of the two periods to "Wolf", the hit single he released in 1985, and a poem that a fortune-teller told him. "The deer bleated/gently towards the hunter's rifle muzzle it walked/gently it toppled/still, with gentle eyes at the hunter it gazed." ("鹿哨呦呦/ 溫柔地走近獵人的槍口/ 溫柔地倒下/ 依然用溫柔的眼神看著獵人").

== Personal life ==
Chyi Chin was in a relationship with Joey Wong from 1985 to 2002. During this period, they separated and reconciled three times, before separating for good in 2002 after a court case and Wong's departure for Canada. They remain friends.

In March 2010, Chyi married 27-year-old Sun Li Ya, in Las Vegas, U.S., and she gave birth to a baby daughter, Bonnie, on 25 March 2011.

On 1 September 2011, Chyi was undergoing cupping therapy when the therapist accidentally spilled alcohol on his body, causing a fire. Chyi suffered non-life-threatening burns to his back, face, and chest. According to a burn expert, he suffered second-degree burn damage to the surface of the skin and the tissue beneath. Though Chyi's voice was not damaged, his engagements for the next two to three months were cancelled to allow him to recuperate.

== Discography ==
=== Wolf Period works ===
- 又見溜溜的她 (1981)
- 狼的專輯 (1985)
- 出沒 (1986)
- 冬雨 (1987)
- 狼II (1987)
- 棋王 (1987)
- 大約在冬季 (1987)
- 流浪思鄉 (1988)
- 紀念日 (1989)
- 愛情宣言 (1990)
- 柔情主義 (1991)
- 狂飆 (1992)

=== Deer Period works ===
- 無情的雨無情的你 (1994)
- 黃金十年 (1994)
- 暗淡的月 (1994)
- 命運的深淵 (1995)
- 痛并快樂著 (1995)
- 純情歌 (1996)
- 絲路 (1996)
- Longer (1997)
- 97狼－黃金自選集 (1997)
- 我拿什么愛你 (1998)
- 世紀情歌之謎 (1998)
- 西藏演唱會 (1998)
- 曠世情歌全紀錄 (2000)
- 呼喚 (2002)
- 网友專輯 (2003)
- 美麗境界 (2010)

== See also ==
- Manchu people in Taiwan
