= Zhejiang Television =

Chinese TV channel

- Logo used since 1994
- Country: China
- Broadcast area: Zhejiang Province
- Network: Zhejiang Radio and Television Group
- Headquarters: Hangzhou, Zhejiang, China

History
- Launched: October 1, 1960; 65 years ago

Links
- Website: www.zjstv.com

ZTV-1

Zhejiang Television (ZJTV, Chinese: 浙江卫视) is a satellite television channel owned by Zhejiang Radio and Television Group serving Zhejiang Province. It was launched on October 1, 1960.

== History ==
The first transmission of Zhejiang Television was broadcast on VHF channel 4 on October 1, 1960. The broadcasts promoted the culture of the region (then Jiangnan), provide news services and analyze the progress of local economic development.

On January 1, 1994, Zhejiang Television adopted satellite broadcasts. Zhejiang Satellite TV provided television services to the large and populous Zhejiang Provence on China's eastern seaboard.

The late 1990s saw planning for future news network organisation and its technology, including digital television. In 2000, the cultural interview program, An Exclusive Interview was launched. In 2004, Zhejiang TV launched Entertainment and Wealth and The World of Zhejiang, two programs which reflected the thematic direction of the network.

In 2005, a new organisational structure consisting of seven television production teams was adopted. The network purchased new "6-4+1" radio frequencies.

Over the following two decades, the network has continued to grow with new news and variety programs. The 2007 programs included, I Love to Remember the Lyrics, Olympic Dream, Super Boy Action, Citizen, College Music Festival, Fan Arena and three dramas with female leads, Love Story, Too Coke and Boys and Girls. The 2008 programs included an I Love to Remember the Lyrics spinoff called The Love to Sing Will Win. There was also a music game show called I am the Judge. On May 17, Wenchuan - the People of Zhejiang Sichuan earthquake Appeal was broadcast.

On August 25, 2008, Zhejiang Television was rebranded as China Blue. One year later, on January 24, 2009, an anniversary jingle called Taiwan is as Blue, and as Boundless as the Sea and Sky was released during a combined standard-definition television (SDTV) and High-definition television (HDTV) simulcast.

From mid 2010, new programs included a music talent show called Extraordinary (July 2010), the reality program China Dream Show (April 2, 2011) and a Gulf of Hangzhou news program (March 25, 2011).

In 2012, the network advanced its marketing with a new The Dream Channel slogan, a fifth anniversary gala celebrating the Let the Dream Fly slogan and the Taiwan is as Blue, and as Boundless as the Sea and Sky song.

A television singing contest based on The Voice was launched on July 13, 2012. The new programs for 2013 included a reality dating program, a family program called The First Time in Life and Who Dares to Stand Out, a quiz show. The new 2014 programs included an original television modeling contest; Dad Answered It, a reality father and son exchange program; The Chinese Good Story, a cultural program; a live special and the first season of Running Man. So it is launched in January 2015 and Burning Young! on November 25, 2015.

In this era, advertising revenue was strong and further new programs began in 2016 including Twenty-four Hours, an outdoor reality program; The Negotiator, and indoor reality athletic competition; Champion Fan, about the 2016 Summer Olympics; The Meeting of Wind and Clouds in conjunction with Sun Media Group which broadcast interviews by journalist, Yang Lan during the Hangzhou G20 Summit. There were further seasons of The Voice; a comedy reality food program, Food Delicacies and a December 30 concert to lead into 2017. In 2017, the network broadcast a reality program for emerging musicians; 22:00; and Youth Group, a high energy program for youngsters.

2021 was notable for Star Chaser. In this reality program, a rotating cast of young celebrities join the program's hosts in scenic locations across China. The celebrities included Zhu Yilong, a brand representative for L'Oréal for men and the actor, Li Yifeng.

== Programs ==
- The Voice of China
- Sing! China
