= Yu Di (singer) =

Chinese singer

Yu Di 余笛
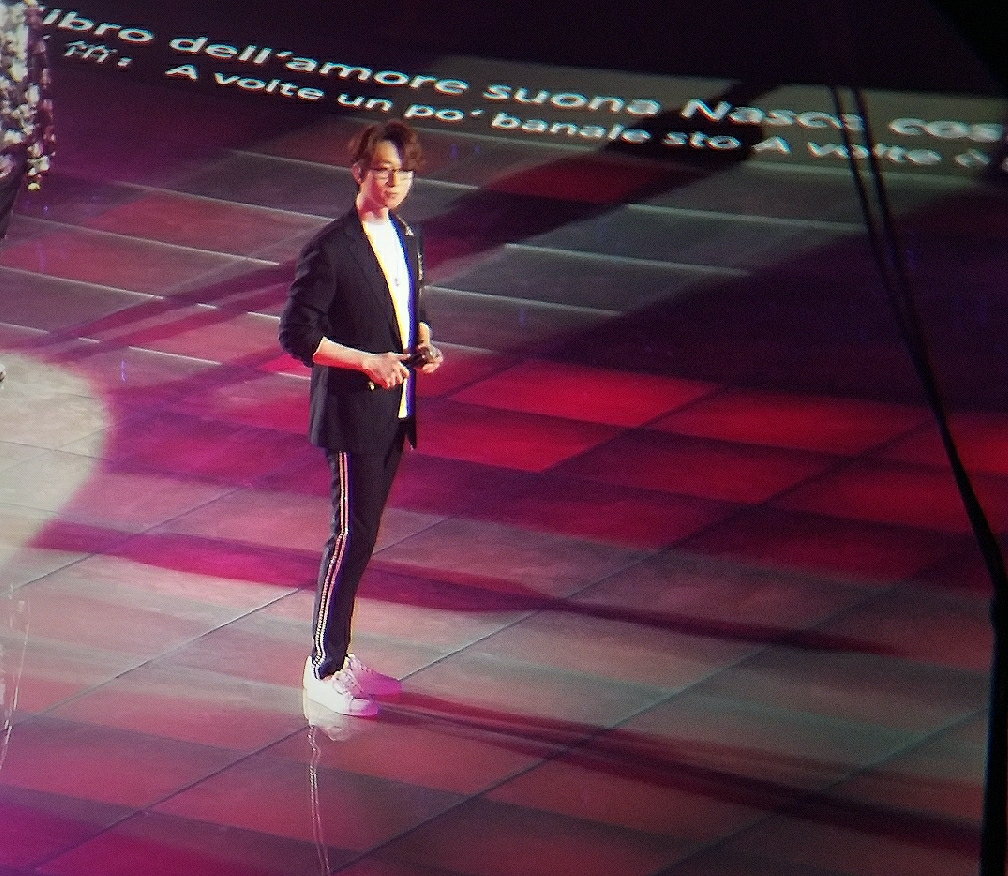

Background information
- Born: November 23, 1981 (age 44); Zigong, Sichuan, China
- Genres: operatic pop; crossover; Mandopop
- Instruments: Vocals, piano
- Years active: 2007–present
- Label: Yu Di Studio
- Member of: Vocal Force

Yu Di (Chinese: 余笛; pinyin: Yú Dí; born November 23, 1981) is a Chinese classical crossover singer-songwriter, musical actor and educator. A classically trained lyric baritone, he combines his singing career with his full-time teaching position at Shanghai Theatre Academy and gained nationwide recognition after participating in the first season of the singing competition Super–Vocal.

== Early life ==
Yu's love for music began at an early age as he grew up in a music-loving household and often listened to and mimicked foreign-language pop songs by singers ranging from Michael Jackson to Jacky Cheung. His given name originates from the fact that his father, an amateur musician, plays the dizi (Chinese flute).

At age 16, Yu enlisted into the People's Liberation Army and became a drummer assigned to the Beijing Military Region. He was selected to participate in the 50th anniversary of the People's Republic of China parade. In December 2000, he received an honorable discharge after serving for three years. Prior to his stint with the military band, he had no formal training in musicianship and was mostly self-taught. He and his bandmates were encouraged by their commanding officer to apply the music theory they learned by composing songs, thus piquing his interest in the art of singing for the first time.

== Career ==
As he did not complete gaozhong (高级中学; grades 10 to 12) and had no formal training in singing, Yu spent the next three months independently studying and preparing for the National College Entrance Examination and Shanghai Conservatory of Music (SHCM) Department of Vocal Music and Opera's notoriously competitive admissions audition. The CCTV featured him in a one-off documentary special entitled "Dream Came True" (圆梦), chronicling his journey from a recently discharged military band drummer to his admission into SHCM; the crew discovered that he was filmed during the 1999 50th anniversary parade for a potential special feature that never came to fruition, thus enabling them use the archived footage for the documentary. His first instructor at the SHCM was renowned bass Wen Kezheng, whom he credited as being the biggest influence on him as an aspiring opera singer. He graduated at the top of his class and continued with graduate studies on a scholarship, eventually earning his master's degree in 2009. As a graduate student, he taught music appreciation courses at Shanghai University Fine Arts College and was part of the first ever Chinese popera group called "Perfect Vocals of Men" (绝妙男声; Hanyu Pinyin: Juémiào nán shēng) along with three other fellow conservatory graduates. At that time, the domestic music industry was still strictly segregated and divided along the lines of "pop" and "classical", despite the popularity of classical crossover artists such as Il Divo and The Three Tenors among domestic music-lovers. The quartet were forced to disband due to a frosty reception from local music producers.

Yu then took up a teaching position at Shanghai Theatre Academy and continued performing both at home and abroad as a soloist. He participated in the 2012 Marmande International Singing Competition and won the CNIPAL Prize, earning a two-year study grant and residency at the Centre National d'Insertion Professionnelle des Artistes Lyriques in Marseille. After completing his residency, he returned to his job at Shanghai Theatre Academy, where he has been ever since.

=== Vocal Force ===
In 2014 Yu and two of his like-minded SHCM schoolmates, fellow baritones Song Gang and Wang Zhida, started a vocal group called "Vocal Force" (力量之声; Hanyu Pinyin: Lìliàng zhī shēng) with the intention of introducing "classical crossover music and bel canto with a Chinese flavor". Like Yu himself, Song and Wang are both music educators at various Shanghai tertiary institutions and shared a desire to address prejudices and stereotypes about classical music, specifically opera and bel canto, being "boring" or "only for the elite". They intentionally did not recruit a tenor to challenge a popular misconception among domestic audiences that the melody must be carried by a higher register such as that of tenors or sopranos and scored their own arrangements to suit their baritone tessiture and vocal range. Due to their main jobs in academia, they mostly release singles rather than full albums and have a limited performance schedule. The trio have stated that they do not intend to enter the entertainment industry full-time as they started the vocal group based on their philosophy of "teaching by example", hence the decision to combine their teaching careers with a career on stage rather than stop performing altogether.

The trio made their debut performance during the Shanghai Spring International Music Festival in May 2014. Initially they mostly performed at college festivals and local municipal events, gaining a sizeable following in Shanghai. In 2016, they became known to wider audiences nationwide after their original song "Our Shanghai" (我们的上海) was chosen as the theme song for the city's tourism promotion campaign and the trio were also featured in the music video and print commercials together with actor and Shanghai native Hu Ge. They have appeared on infotainment programs, conducted seminars for music teachers and given lectures at schools and music interest clubs in addition to releasing music and performing.

=== Super Vocal and other activities ===
Yu appeared in the Hunan Television variety-reality show Grade One Freshman (一年级·大学季) and its sequel Grade One Graduation (一年级·毕业季), which featured celebrities experiencing college life at the Shanghai Theatre Academy. He was among the instructors who made guest appearances on both shows.

In 2018, Yu took a short sabbatical from his teaching job after he successfully applied to participate in the classical crossover singing competition Super–Vocal. He did not perform during the first duet stage as he was assigned to the understudy group. Instead he and fellow vocal instructor Hong Zhiguang of Yale School of Music first came to the viewers' attention for their spontaneous duet rendition of the popular aria "Votre toast, je peux vous le rendre" from Carmen during a challenge to win the right to perform in the upcoming second duet stage and the uploaded clip went viral on social media. Videos of his next two performances, during the trio stage, went viral on Weibo, each tallying over 2 million views within two days and earning rave reviews from both viewers and industry professionals. He was chosen by the judges as principal four times in total but was ultimately overlooked during the final voting round to select the members of the vocal group.

After the show ended, Yu split his time between performing with Vocal Force on various televised music programs and with fellow Super-Vocal participants in a nationwide tour. In March 2019, he was one of three Super–Vocal participants who performed together with Il Volo in Rome to celebrate China-Italy relations. The Chinese delegation had visited Rome to sign a series of investment agreements related to the Belt and Road Initiative.

Yu made his debut in musical theater with the Chinese adaption of Stephen Dolginoff's critically acclaimed Flames, which began its run in December 2019. Due to a limited touring schedule amidst COVID-19 pandemic lock-downs and movement restrictions, he mostly worked on new music and released several digital singles, including a song entitled 余情不了 (Hanyu Pinyin: Yúqínbùliăo) dedicated to his wife which was released on Qixi (Chinese Valentine's Day). The song 琴歌 (Hanyu Pinyin: Qín gē; roughly translates to mean "Piano Song") was co-composed by himself and a friend as a tribute to the love story of his late former conservatory instructor Wen Kezheng and the latter's widow Wang Qiu, herself a renowned pianist and accompanist.

In February 2021, Yu released his first solo studio album containing original music, some of which were self-composed. Several of the tracks were digital singles he had released the previous years and were either composed or produced by other Super-Vocal participants.

From March to May 2022, Yu played Shen Fu in Our Life-Long Serendipity, a new musical adaptation of the autobiographical literary classic Six Records of a Floating Life. A musical adaptation already existed but the production team revised the original script and added dramatic elements of Chinese opera. Yu served as the musical director and composed an original song for the updated version.

Since 2024, Yu has been a member of the Board of Directors of the Shanghai Musicians Association (上海音乐家协会).

In October 2024 Yu reunited with some of his Super-Vocal castmates for a guest appearance on the fourth season of Time Concert (时光音乐会), a popular music program on Hunan Television that features singers from popular past singing programs such as Super Girl.

== Personal life ==
Yu is married to SMG producer and presenter Chen Chen (陈辰). They have a daughter (born in 2020) and a son (born in 2024).

== Discography ==
=== Singles ===
Year	English title	Chinese title	Album	Notes
2019	"The Tree Near You"	你路旁的树	non-album single	
2019	"Heroes"	闪亮的名字	Heroes (闪亮的名字) OST	
2019	"Time Goes By"	时光不散	non-album single	
2019	"Birds Fly At Dusk"	黄昏时 众鸟飞逝	Monsieur Yu 余生	with Zheng Yunlong
2019	"Beside You"	身畔	Monsieur Yu 余生	
2019	"We Are Loved"	我们都被爱着	Monsieur Yu 余生	
2020	"Piano Song"	琴歌	Monsieur Yu 余生	
2020	"Can't Love"	余情不了	Monsieur Yu 余生	

=== Participation singles ===
Year	English title	Chinese title	Album	Notes
2018	"Clouds of My Hometown"	故乡的云	Super-Vocal (Episode 5)	with Hong Zhiguang
2018	"Bella ciao" (Italian and Mandarin mash-up)	啊，朋友再见	Super-Vocal (Episode 6)	with Hong Zhiguang and Gong Ziqi
2018	"Les Rois du monde" (from Roméo et Juliette)	世界之王	Super-Vocal (Episode 7)	with Hong Zhiguang and Ayanga
2018	"Nel blu, dipinto di blu"	你眼里的蓝	Super-Vocal (Episode 8)	with Zhaili Shuotian and Wang Kai
2018	欢乐Song (Ode to Joy remake / Spanish and Mandarin mash-up)		Super-Vocal (Episode 9)	with Zhaili Suotian and Gong Ziqi
2019	"Halo"		Super-Vocal (Episode 11)	with Cai Chengyu, Wang Kai and Ju Hongchuan
2019	"Il Libro Dell' Amore"	爱之书	Super-Vocal (Episode 12)	with Wang Kai, Ju Hongchuan and Gao Tianhe

=== Studio album ===
Title	Album details
Monsieur Yu 余生	Released: February 5, 2021; Label: Yu Di Studio; Format: digital download; Track listing: 1. 春晓; 2. 余情不了; 3. 我们都被爱着; 4. 琴歌; 5. 一期一会; 6. 我依然知道心里的歌; 7. 大雪未雪; 8. 黄昏时 众鸟飞逝 (with Zheng Yunlong); 9. 身畔; 10. 写给你十八岁的晚安曲

== Filmography ==
Year	English title	Chinese title	Notes
2002	Chronicle — "Dream Came True"	纪事 — 圆梦	
2015	Grade One Freshman	一年级·大学季	
2016–2017	Grade One Graduation	一年级·毕业季	
2018–19	Super–Vocal (season 1)	声入人心	
2020	Kevin Hours — Teach Me How to Miss Him	可凡倾听 — 教我如何不想他	
