= Cai Chengyu =

Chinese tenor

- 蔡程昱
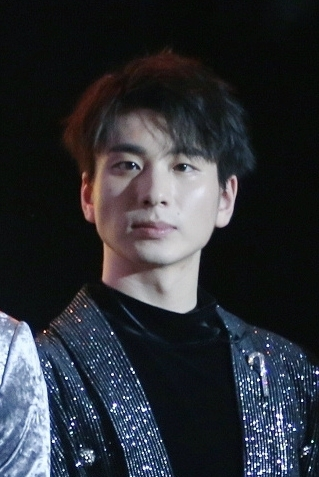
- Chengyu in 2019
- Born: January 17, 1998 (age 27); Suzhou, Anhui, China
- Other names: Cai High C
- Education: Shanghai Conservatory of Music
- Occupation: Opera crossover singer (tenor)

Chinese name
- Traditional Chinese: 蔡程昱
- Simplified Chinese: 蔡程昱
Transcriptions
Standard Mandarin
- Hanyu Pinyin: Cài Chéngyù

Cai Chengyu (Chinese: 蔡程昱; born January 17, 1998) is a Chinese tenor. He is known for participating in Hunan TV's singing variety show Super-Vocal where he first gained attention and recognition for becoming one of the top 6 leading singers in 2018. Cai joined Decca Records in 2019 and released his first solo EP Cai Chengyu in 2021. Cai made his opera debut as Don Ottavio in Don Giovanni produced by Shanghai Opera House in 2020 and his debut at National Centre for the Performing Arts as Camille de Rosillon in The Merry Widow in 2023.

Cai obtained his bachelor's and master's degree from Shanghai Conservatory of Music in 2021 and 2024 respectively.

== Personal life ==
Cai grew up in Suzhou, Anhui, China and attended Sucheng No.1 Middle School. In his last music class in high school, he performed "Heroes' Song" (好汉歌) at his classmates' invitation. Impressed by Cai's talent, his music teacher encouraged him to pursue a career in music. A year later in 2015, he successfully made to the Department of Vocal Music and Opera of Shanghai Conservatory of Music with the fourth best grades nationwide.

Prior to his debut on Super-Vocal, Cai has participated in Shanghai Conservatory of Music production of Don Giovanni, Così fan tutte, Carmina Burana, etc.. Cai studied under baritone Wang Kaiwei and graduated with a bachelor's degree in 2021 at top of the class. He was one of the three students in the class who were recommended to SHCM master's admission with exemption of Nationwide Master's Program Unified Admissions Examination and earned his master's degree in 2024.

== Singing career ==
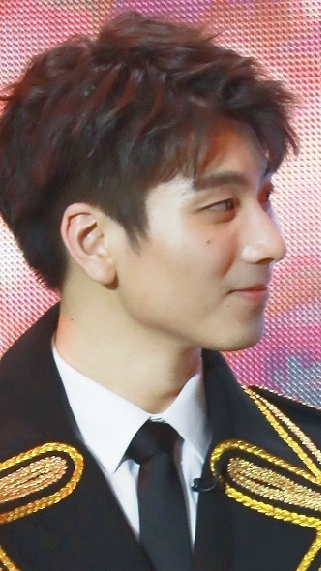
Chengyu in April 2019

In 2018, Cai participated in Hunan TV singing variety show Super-Vocal. He made his debut by performing "Ah! mes amis", one of the well-known arias from the opera "La fille du régiment". Later in the competition, he has been continuously improving and finally made to the top 6 leading singers in Super-Vocal for the year of 2018.

In February 2019, he was invited to participate in Hunan TV singing competition Singer together with other finalists from Super-Vocal and achieved the third place in the Final. In November 2019, Cai joined Decca Records and teamed up with other three vocalists as the new bel canto ensemble Super Vocal. In the same month, on the 25th Anniversary of Riverdance, Cai released a Mandarin version of the show's principle song Lift The Wings feat. Bill Whelan.

On 24 January, Cai performed Ode to the Yellow River in 2020 CCTV Chinese New Year's Gala. In March 2020, Cai participated in Singer: Year of the Hits as a member of Super Vocal. In July 2020, Cai played Don Ottavio in the concert version of opera Don Giovanni produced by Shanghai Opera House under the baton of Xu Zhong. In December 2020, Cai was invited to perform at the Yellow Lounge China Grand Opening.

In January 2021, Cai released his first solo EP Cai Chengyu with Decca Records and held his first recital at Shanghai Concert Hall. In June 2021, Cai performed in large scale epic The Great Journey in celebration of the 100th Anniversary of the Chinese Communist Party. Starting from September 2021, Cai rolled out his first recital tour The Light Beyond.

On January 31, 2022, Cai performed Reminiscing Jiangnan in the 2022 CCTV Chinese New Year's Gala.

In May 2023, Cai played Alfredo in the opera La Traviata co-produced by Shanghai Conservatory of Music and Theatre Kiel with Zhang Jiemin conducting. The opera was also invited to the 2023 China Opera Festival in Hangzhou. In October 2023, Cai made his debut at National Centre for the Performing Arts as Camille de Rosillon in The Merry Widow under the baton of Thomas Rösner.

In November 2024, Cai returned as Don Ottavio in Don Giovanni co-produced by Shanghai Opera House and Shanghai International Arts Festival under the baton of Xu Zhong. In the same month, he also played Alfred in Die Fledermaus produced by National Centre for the Performing Arts under the baton of Marc Minkowski.

== Discography ==
=== Albums/EPs ===
| Title | Original title | Release date | Type | Label | Genre |
|---|---|---|---|---|---|
| Cai Chengyu | 蔡程昱 | January 15, 2021 | EP | Decca | Classical Crossover |

=== Singles ===
| Year | Title | Original title | Note |
|---|---|---|---|
| 2024 | The Dream of an Old Friend at the End of the World | 天涯故人梦 | Produced by Beijing Musician's Association |
| 2024 | Travel around the Planets | 环游行星 | |
| 2023 | Amore Mio, Dormi Bene | 星月无尽 | |
| 2023 | A Wind from the South | 有风自南 | Theme song for Guangzhou Literature Night |
| 2023 | Praise the Fool | 赞美愚者 | Theme song for Code:Mystery, the mobile game of web novel Lord of Mysteries |
| 2022 | Building the Dreams | 筑梦 | Theme song for Xinhua News Agency reporting group for Beijing 2022 Winter Olympic Games |
| 2022 | Qu Yuan's Song | 屈子吟 | From Henan TV Adventure of The Dragon Boat Festival |
| 2022 | Fairy Sea | 仙海 | City theme song for Yantai |
| 2021 | Like Lights with Shadows | 像光陪影子一样 | Cover of Love Changes Everything from the musical Aspects of Love |
| 2021 | Set Out | 出发 | |
| 2019 | Lift the Wings | Lift the Wings | feat. Bill Whelan, Chinese theme song commemorating 25th Anniversary of Riverdance |
| 2019 | Original Aspiration | 初心 | Xinhua News Agency theme song for 98th Anniversary of the founding of Chinese Communist Party |
| 2019 | Journey | 征程 | Xinhua News Agency theme song commemorating 100th Anniversary of May Fourth Movement |
| 2019 | That's it | 那就这样吧 | NetEase "Remake of Youth", cover Power Station |

== Theatre and concert ==
=== Opera/Operetta ===
| Year | Title | Role | Producer |
|---|---|---|---|
| 2020 | Don Giovanni (Concert) | Don Ottavio | Shanghai Opera House |
| 2023 | La Traviata | Alfredo Germont | Shanghai Conservatory of Music, Theatre Kiel |
| 2023 | The Merry Widow | Camille de Rosillon | National Centre for the Performing Arts |
| 2024 | Don Giovanni | Don Ottavio | Shanghai Opera House, Shanghai International Arts Festival |
| 2024 | Die Fledermaus | Alfred | National Centre for the Performing Arts |
| 2025 | Falstaff | Fenton | Shanghai Opera House |
| 2025 | The Land of Smiles | Prince Sou-Chong | Shanghai Opera House |
| 2026 | Die Fledermaus | Alfred | Shanghai Philharmonic Orchestra |

=== Recital ===
- Cai Chengyu first solo concert The Light Beyond (Shanghai, January 28, 2021)
- Cai Chengyu 2021 Recital Tour The Light Beyond (Shenzhen, Shanghai, etc., September 2021 – November 2021)
- Cai Chengyu Recital Tour The Light Beyond (Beijing, October 28, 2023, rescheduled for the postponed one in 2021)
- Cai Chengyu Master's Recital (Shanghai, November 24, 2023, for master's degree graduation)

=== Others ===
For the concert tour dedicated for the variety show Super-Vocal, please see Super-Vocal.

| Year | Title | Location |
|---|---|---|
| 2019 | "Memory · Nostalgia" Guangzhou Liao Changyong Concert | Guangzhou |
| 2020 | Opera Selection Ensemble Concert | Shanghai |
| 2020 | A Hundred Years of Chinese Artistic Songs Concert | Shanghai |
| 2020–2021 | The Long March Symphony | Shanghai |
| 2021 | Beijing Great Wall Concert | Beijing |
| 2023 | Symphony Concert in celebration of The 102nd Anniversary of the Founding of Communist Party of China | Beijing |
| 2023 | The Classic Songs Symphony Concert | Xi'an |

== Filmography ==
=== Music videos ===
| Song title | Release date | Singer |
|---|---|---|
| Journey (征程) | April 30, 2019 | Cai Chengyu & Lu Binqi |
| Whatever (管他呢) | November 8, 2019 | Lou Yixiao |
| The Light Beyond (自己的明天) | November 20, 2020 | Cai Chengyu |

=== Variety shows ===
| Year | English title | Original title | Episode |
|---|---|---|---|
| 2018 | Super-Vocal Season 1 | 声入人心 | |
| 2018 | Day Day Up | 天天向上 | December 13, 2018 |
| 2019 | Singer 2019 (Season 7) | 歌手2019 | EP6 ~ EP12 |
| 2019 | Let's Sing Together | 合唱吧, 300 | September 1, 2019 |
| 2019 | Happy Corner/Happy Camp | 快乐大本营 | November 23, 2019 |
| 2019 | Super-Vocal Season 2 | 声入人心2 | EP8, EP9 |
| 2020 | Singer: Year of the Hits (Season 8) | 歌手当打之年 | EP7 ~ EP11 |
| 2020 | Go Newbies | 新手驾到 | |
| 2021 | Teens Party in Summer | 夏日少年派 | |
| 2021 | The Store of Hope | 云上的小店 | EP7, EP8 |
| 2022 | The Everlasting Classics Season 5 | 经典咏流传第五季 | EP1, EP4 |
| 2022 | Best Play | 拿手好戏 | EP7, EP9 |
| 2023 | Time Concert Season 2 | 时光音乐会第二季 | EP7 |
| 2023 | The Everlasting Classics Season 6 | 经典咏流传第六季 | EP2 |
| 2023 | Run for Time 2023 | 全员加速中2023 | EP2, EP5, EP12 |
| 2024 | Run for Time 2024 | 全员加速中·对抗季 | EP4, EP8, EP11, EP12 |
| 2024 | Hello, Saturday | 你好，星期六 | May 4, 2024 |
| 2024 | Journey of Chinese Art on the Scroll Season 2 | 诗画中国第二季 | EP7 |
| 2024 | Time Concert Season 4 | 时光音乐会第四季 | EP3 |

== Performance ==
=== Super-Vocal 声入人心 ===
| Episode | Date | Song title | Notes |
|---|---|---|---|
| 1 | November 2, 2018 | Ah! mes amis. | |
| 3 | November 16, 2018 | Grande Amore | Performed with Ma Jia |
| 4 | November 23, 2018 | Deer Be Free (鹿 Be Free) | Performed with Ayanga |
| 5 | November 30, 2018 | Sorry, I Love You (对不起，我爱你) | Performed with Zheng Yunlong |
| 6 | December 7, 2018 | Melodramma | Performed with Fang Shujian |
| 8 | December 21, 2018 | Can You Feel the Love Tonight | Performed with Ding Hui and Jia Fan |
| 9 | December 29, 2018 | Per Te Ci Saro | Performed with Gao Yang and Li Qi |
| 10 | January 4, 2019 | Au fond du temple saint | Performed with Jia Fan |
| 11 | January 11, 2019 | Halo | Performed with Ju Hongchuan, Wang Kai and Yu Di |
| 12 | January 18, 2019 | Auld Lang Syne (友谊地久天长) | Performed with Tong Zhuo and Wang Xi |

=== Galas ===
| Year | Gala |
|---|---|
| 2024 | CCTV Sail Far and Wide Greater Bay Area 2024 New Year Concert |
| 2024 | 2024 Anhui TV China TV Drama Awards |
| 2024 | 2024 Four Continents Figure Skating Championships Opening Ceremony |
| 2024 | 2024 CCTV Classic Night |
| 2024 | 2024 Anhui TV Chinese New Year's Gala |
| 2024 | 2024 CCTV Chinese New Year's Gala Xi'an Branch Venue Special Program |
| 2024 | 2024 Dragon TV Chinese New Year's Gala |
| 2024 | 2024 Chinese Literary and Art Circles New Year's Gala |
| 2024 | 2024 CCTV Lantern Festival Gala |
| 2024 | 2024 Dragon TV Lantern Festival Gala |
| 2024 | 2024 Hunan TV Labour Day Gala |
| 2024 | 2024 CCTV Labour Day Special Program |
| 2024 | 2024 CCTV Dragon Boat Festival Gala |
| 2024 | The 37th Hundred Flowers Awards Ceremony |
| 2024 | 2024 CCTV Qixi Festival Gala |
| 2024 | 2024 Dragon TV Mid-Autumn Festival Gala |
| 2023 | 2023 CCTV Chinese New Year's Network Gala |
| 2023 | 2023 SXTV Silk Road Chinese New Year Gala |
| 2023 | 2023 Global overseas Chinese Spring Festival Gala |
| 2023 | 2023 CCTV Lantern Festival Gala |
| 2023 | 2023 Sail Far and Wide Greater Bay Area Concert |
| 2023 | CCTV China in Lights |
| 2023 | 2023 BTV May Fourth Gala |
| 2023 | 2023 CCTV May Fourth Special Program |
| 2023 | The 28th Shanghai Television Festival Magnolia Awards Ceremony |
| 2023 | The 102nd Anniversary of the Founding of Chinese Communist Party Symphony Concert |
| 2023 | The 38th Harbin Summer Music Concert Opening Ceremony |
| 2023 | 2023 CCTV Qixi Festival Gala |
| 2023 | 2023 Hunan TV Mid-Autumn Festival Gala |
| 2023 | 2023 CCTV National Day Special Program |
| 2023 | 2023–2024 CCTV New Year Gala |
| 2022 | 2022 CCTV Chinese New Year's Gala |
| 2022 | 2022 Hunan TV Chinese New Year's Gala |
| 2022 | 2022 Dragon TV Chinese New Year's Gala |
| 2022 | 2022 Chinese Literary and Art Circles New Year's Gala |
| 2022 | 2022 CCTV Lantern Festival Gala |
| 2022 | 2022 Henan TV May Forth Gala |
| 2022 | 2022 Henan TV Adventure of The Dragon Boat Festival |
| 2022 | 2022 CCTV National Day Concert |
| 2022 | 2022–2023 CCTV New Year Gala |
| 2022 | 2022–2023 Hunan TV New Year's Gala |
| 2021 | 2021 CCTV Lantern Festival Gala |
| 2021 | 2021 Hunan TV Lantern Festival Gala |
| 2021 | 2021 Hunan TV May Fourth Gala |
| 2021 | 2021 Hunan TV Mid-Autumn Gala |
| 2021 | The Great Journey: celebration of the 100th Anniversary of the Founding of the Chinese Communist Party |
| 2021 | 2021–2022 CCTV New Year Gala |
| 2021 | 2021–2022 Hunan TV New Year Gala |
| 2020 | 2020 CCTV Chinese New Year's Gala |
| 2020 | 2020 National Day Concert |
| 2020 | 2020–2021 Hunan TV New Year Gala |
| 2019 | Chinese Literary and Art Circles New Year's Gala |
| 2019 | 2019 CCTV Lantern Festival Gala |
| 2019 | 2019 CCTV Qixi Festival Gala |
| 2019 | 2019 FIBA Men's Basketball World Cup Opening Ceremony |
| 2019 | 2019 National Day Concert |
| 2019 | 2019 Global overseas Chinese Spring Festival |
| 2019 | 2019 Hunan TV Mid-Autumn Festival Gala |
| 2018 | 2018–2019 Hunan TV New Year Gala |
