= Super–Vocal season 1 =

2018 Chinese television seasons

This is a list of episodes of Super-Vocal Season 1 in 2018 to early 2019. Super-Vocal was broadcast on Hunan TV from November 2, 2018 to January 18, 2019.

== Format ==
From episodes 1-7, the six best performances (solo, duets, or trios) are chosen after being judged by the three show producers, and are given the Principal recommendation. Six other performances are chosen as Understudy recommendations, and attempt to defeat the Principal performances. The ending Principal performances go on to be the Principal performances of the next week. Starting in episode 8, the members divide into six groups of six members, led by members who have been Principal performers the most. The final round culminates in six winners, that were able to go on to perform on Singer 2019, as a Challenger Singer. The winning Principal members of this season were Ayanga, Zheng Yunlong, Cai Chengyu, Gao Tianhe, Wang Kai, and Tong Zhuo.

== Singers ==
Name	Vocal Range	Amount of Principal Recommendations
Jia Fan	Baritone	2
Tong Zhuo	Baritone	2
Lars Huang	Tenor	3
Li Xiangzhe	Bass	1
Ayanga	Tenor	10
Ding Hui	Baritone	1
Fang Shujian	Baritone	3
Liu Binhao	Baritone	1
Cai Yao	Tenor	0
Shi Kai	Baritone	0
Zheng Yunlong	Tenor	7
Jin Shengquan	Tenor	3
Nan Feng	Tenor	1
Zhang Chao	Baritone	3
Cai Chengyu	Tenor	6
Li Wenbao	Tenor	1
Dai Wei	Baritone	0
Lu Yupeng	Baritone	2
Chen Bohao	Tenor	0
Gong Ziqi	Baritone	2
Li Yanfeng	Tenor	0
Zhai Lishuotian	Baritone	0
Liang Pengjie	Baritone	3
Gao Tianhe	Countertenor	5
Li Qi	Tenor	2
Jian Hongyi	Baritone	2
Liao Jialin	Countertenor	2
Xing Yuan	Tenor	0
Gao Yang	Tenor	1
Wang Kai	Tenor	3
Ju Hongchuan	Baritone	1
Yu Di	Baritone	4
Ma Jia	Tenor	0
Hong Zhiguang	Baritone	3
Elvis Wang	Bass	4
Zhou Shen	Countertenor	1

=== Episodes ===
Episode #	Broadcast Date	Format	Principal Performances	Understudy Performances	Final Principals
S01E01	November 2, 2018	The members introduce themselves and perform a song for the producers. Six of them are chosen to be Principal members.	All members performed a song of their choice for the producers.		Cai Chengyu Li Qi Wang Xi Liao Jialin Jin Shengquan Ayanga
S01E02	November 7, 2018	The members introduce themselves and perform a song for the producers. Six of them are chosen to be Principal members.	All members performed a song of their choice for the producers.		Cai Chengyu Li Qi Wang Xi Liao Jialin Jin Shengquan Ayanga
S01E03	November 16, 2018	Six Understudy members were selected to sing duets with the Principal members. The best member of the duet became the Principal member. Afterwards, the Understudy members divided into duets to sing either "To the Horizon With You", "Quest", or "Happy Heart". The pair with the best performance for each song was chosen.	Li Qi and Gao Tianhe "I Dreamed a Dream" Liao Jialin and Zheng Yunlong "A Poet's Journey" Jin Shengquan and Shi Kai "Perhaps & Wavering Moon" Cai Chengyu and Ma Jia "Grande Amore" Ayanga and Fang Shujian "That Man" Wang Xi and Gao Yang "She is So Pretty"		Cai Chengyu Gao Tianhe Wang Xi Zheng Yunlong Jin Shengquan Ayanga
S01E04	November 23, 2018	The Principal members split up into duets to compete against the Understudy duets chosen in S01E03. The winning duet became Principal members. Afterwards, the Understudy members divided into duets to sing either "Libiamo Ne' Lieti Calici", "Toreador Song", or "My Homeland". The pair with the best performance for each song was chosen. The Principal members divided into different duet groups.	Ayanga and Cai Chengyu "Deer be Free" Wang Xi and Zheng Yunlong "Growing Fond of You" Gao Tianhe and Jin Shengquan "Lost Stars"	Zhai Lishuotian and Li Xiangzhe "Happy Heart" Lars Huang and Ding Hui "Quest" Jia Fan and Lu Yupeng "To the Horizon With You"	Cai Chengyu Ayanga Wang Xi Zheng Yunlong Jia Fan Lu Yupeng
S01E05	November 30, 2018	All members take a music theory test. The Principal duets compete against the Understudy duets for a Principal position. Afterwards, the new Principal duets each choose an Understudy member to form a trio. Each Understudy member chooses a song and performs it solo for a chance to perform on the stage.	Zheng Yunlong and Cai Chengyu "Sorry I Love You" Wang Xi and Ayanga "Times Gone By" Jia Fan and Lu Yupeng "Kapok Blossoms"	Liao Jialin and Wang Kai "The Final Faith" Yu Di and Hong Zhiguang "Clouds of My Homeland" Nan Feng and Li Wenbao "My Homeland"	Liao Jialin Wang Kai Yu Di Hong Zhiguang Nan Feng Li Wenbao
S01E06	December 7, 2018	The Understudy members chosen in the last episode play Charades with song names to determine duet partners. The Understudy duets and Principal trios all competed for six Principal spots. Afterwards, the Understudy members divide into solos, duets, and trios. The best of each type goes on to perform the next week.	Nan Feng, Li Wenbao, and Xing Yuan "A Rippling Brook" Tong Zhuo, Wang Kai, and Liao Jialin "Love Moves" Hong Zhiguang, Yu Di, and Gong Ziqi "Bella Ciao"	Gao Tianhe and Jian Hongyi "Danny Boy" Cai Chengyu and Fang Shujian "Melodrama" Jia Fan and Ayanga "The River of Life"	Jian Hongyi Gao Tianhe Gong Ziqi Hong Zhiguang Ayanga Yu Di
S01E07	December 14, 2018	He Jiong meets with the members to inspire the six members who have yet to perform on stage. Both the Understudy and Principal members divide into solos, duets, and trios and compete as a team. The group that has three wins has all the members becoming Principal members. The teams tie, and a tiebreaker solo is sung.	Jian Hongyi and Gong Ziqi "A River Apart" Gao Tianhe "She is my Sin" Yu Di, Hong Zhiguang, Ayanga "Les Rois du Monde"	Zhou Shen "Memory" Zhang Chao and Zheng Yunlong "Beauty and the Beast" Wang Xi, Li Qi, Ju Hongchuan "The Sound of Silence"	Jian Hongyi Gong Ziqi Gao Tianhe Yu Di Hong Zhiguang Ayanga
S01E08	December 21, 2018	The six Principal members create teams of six members total. The teams then choose three members to sing as a trio. The teams that received a Principal recommendation then compete for an opportunity for a career recommendation.	Jia Fan, Ding Hui and Cai Chengyu "Can You Feel the Love Tonight" Ayanga, Liang Pengjie, and Zheng Yunlong "Love's Atonement" Tong Zhuo, Ma Jia, and Gao Tianhe "Nessun Dorma" Zhou Shen, Liu Binhao, and Wang Xi "Hawthorn Tree" Hong Zhiguang, Shi Kai, and Chen Bohao "Edelweiss" Yu Di, Zhai Lishuotian, and Wang Kai "Nel blu, dipinto di blu"		Fang Shujian Liang Pengjie Ayanga Zheng Yunlong Lars Huang Zhang Chao
S01E09	December 29, 2018	The weakest team from last episode loses the chance to perform, while the Principal team is allowed to have all of its members performing. Again, the teams with Principal recommendations compete for a career recommendation.	Ayanga and Zheng Yunlong "The Music of the Night" and "The Phantom of the Opera" Lars Huang, Fang Shujian, Liang Pengjie, and Zhang Chao "Csikos Post"	Yu Di, Zhai Lishuotian, and Gong Ziqi "Happy Song" Dai Wei, Li Yanfeng, and Gao Tianhe "Luna" Gao Yang, Li Qi, and Cai Chengyu "Per Te Ci Saro" Jin Shengquan, Wang Xi, and Li Xiangzhe "La Paloma"	Li Qi Lu Yupeng Cai Chengyu Ding Hui Jia Fan Gao Yang and Fang Shujian Liang Pengjie Ayanga Zheng Yunlong Lars Huang Zhang Chao
S01E10	January 4, 2019	Both Principal teams are allowed to have all their members performing again. The two remaining Understudy teams perform in trios. The winning Principal team will have priority in choosing a producer to collaborate with. The teams with Principal recommendations compete for a career recommendation.	Jia Fan and Cai Chengyu "Au Fond du Temple Saint" Lars Huang, Fang Shujian, Liang Pengjie, Zhang Chao "Snowflake's Happiness" Ayanga and Zheng Yunlong "I Belong to Myself" Lu Yupeng, Gao Yang, Ding Hui, Li Qi "Seasons of Love"	Xing Yuan, Ma Jia, and Tong Zhuo "La Vita" Wang Xi, Zhou Shen, and Cai Yao "Over the Rainbow"	Ayanga Zheng Yunlong Fang Shujian Lars Huang Zhang Chao Liang Pengjie
S01E11	January 11, 2019	Two Principal teams and one Understudy team work with one of the producers to perform two rounds. One round includes the producer, and the other is made up of the remaining performers. The winning team goes on to the Principal rounds, as well as three additional members, chosen by the producers.	Zhang Chao, Fang Shujian, Henry Lau, Zheng Yunlong, Lars Huang, and Liang Pengjie "The Greatest Show" Cai Yao, Jin Shengquan, Liao Changyong, Li Xiangzhe, and Liu Binhao "Horizon" Zhou Shen and Wang Xi "Crescent Moon" Ayanga "Yellow Grasslands"	Gao Tianhe, Shang Wenjie, Tong Zhuo "Imagination" Cai Chengyu, Wang Kai, Yu Di, and Ju Hongchuan "Halo"	Gao Tianhe Tong Zhuo Cai Chengyu Wang Kai Yu Di Ju Hongchuan Wang Xi Ayanga Zheng Yunlong
S01E12	January 18, 2019	The nine Principal members perform in groups and solos to win a spot as a final Principal member.	Zheng Yunlong and Ayanga "I'll Cover You" Wang Xi, Tong Zhuo, and Cai Chengyu "Auld Lang Syne" Ju Hongchuan, Yu Di, Wang Kai, and Gao TIanhe "The Book of Love" Zheng Yunlong "Beyond the Horizon" Wang Xi "Who" Ju Hongchuan "A Lovely Rose" Yu Di "Speak Softly, Love" Tong Zhuo "JiuEr" Gao Tianhe "Variations on Mayra"		Ayanga Cai Chengyu Wang Kai Zheng Yunlong Gao Tianhe Tong Zhuo
