= Singing with Legends =

Chinese singing variety show

- Also known as: Our Song
- 我們的歌
- Genre: Variety Show
- Directed by: Chen Hong
- Presented by: Lin Hai
- Country of origin: Chinese
- Original language: Mandarin
- No. of seasons: 6
- No. of episodes: 12 episodes per season

Production
- Producer: Dong Ge
- Production location: China

Original release
- Network: Dragon Television
- Release: 27 October 2019 – present

Singing with Legends (Chinese: 我们的歌), alternately known as Our Song, is a variety show that pairs rising stars with role-model singers who compete to find the best pair over 12 episodes. It first premiered in China on October 27, 2019 through a parallel release on SMG Entertainment's Dragon TV and its respective Youtube channel.

The original concept of the show was inspired by the collaboration between Fei Yu-ching and Jay Chou on the song 千里之外 (Far Away). Its main goal is to serve as a bridge for different generations in the music industry and revive classic songs that may have been overlooked by current audiences. This first season was dedicated to Fei Yu-ching as the last variety show he participated on before his retirement.

The "Y" logo shows up often in the stage design and is thematically important to the show. It represents the convergence of generations to promote the exchange of ideas. The stage design is a "Y" shape, there are "Y" buttons to create pairs, and "Y" attachments to the singers' microphones.

== Show format ==
The singers are randomized into group A and group B to manage the large number of participants. The show alternates which group was featured in the episode until they are slowly eliminated. The last three pairs compete for the final title of "Golden Partners", while the runner-ups receive the title of "Silver Partners".

Both rookie and veteran singers are anonymized using facial blurring and voice modifications until the rookie sings in the "auditions". The veteran singer bids for the rookie singer they want to blind duet with. Participating singers have rehearsed their parts separately, but are unable to see their partner and do not know how they will sing the song, hence the "blind duet". After the performance, the singers must mutually agree to form a partnership or attempt to pair off with a different singer later.

In the tournament episodes, duos faced off to garner audience votes. The most popular group was named the champion of the episode. The other three pairs sang additional songs to decide the second, third and fourth place winners. Episodes 7 and 8 were team battles between Groups A and B. The four singers on each of the assigned teams must perform three songs and did not need to stay in their original pairs. The groups with the lowest votes are eliminated.

The top four pairs proceed to the next phase of the competition along with two singers who were eliminated to rejoin the show as audience picks. These two form a new duo. As such, five pairs proceeded to the semi-finals through another round of audience voting. The group with the lowest overall ranking in the semi-final episodes is eliminated. In the finals, the top three teams perform two songs to decide on the champions.

== Season 1 ==
Season 1 Participants
	Name	Designation	Group
1	Fei Yu-ching	Role model singer	Group A
2	Hacken Lee	Role model singer	Group A
3	Richie Jen	Role model singer	Group A
4	Luo Qi	Role model singer	Group A
5	Wakin Chau	Role model singer	Group B
6	Na Ying	Role model singer	Group B
7	Huang Kaiqin	Role model singer	Group B
8	Tanya Chua	Role model singer	Group B
9	Xu Weizhou	Rookie singer	Group A
10	Zhou Shen	Rookie singer	Group A
11	Liu Yuning	Rookie singer	Group A
12	Wang Lingkai	Rookie singer	Group A
13	Jiang Yiqiao	Rookie singer	Group B
14	Xiao Zhan	Rookie singer	Group B
15	Li Ziting	Rookie singer	Group B
16	Ayanga	Rookie singer	Group B
17	Angela Zhang	Substitute role model	Group B

Episode Rankings
		1	2	3	4	5	6	7	8	9	10	11		12	
	Name	Group A Blind Selection	Group A Challenge	Group B Blind Selection	Group B Challenge	Group A Qualifiers	Group B Qualifiers	Rank 3 and 4 Challenge	Rank 1 and 2 Challenge	Team Challenge	Team Challenge	Semi-Finals		Final Placements	
1	Fei Yu-ching	Xu Weizhou	3	-	-	4	-	Audience Save	-	2	1	2	-	1	2
2	Hacken Lee	Zhou Shen	1	-	-	3	-	Duo Advances	Duo Advances	1	2	1	-	3	1
3	Richie Jen	Liu Yuning	4	-	-	2	-	-	Audience Save	4	5	-	-	-	-
4	Luo Qi	Wang Lingkai	2	-	-	1	-	-	-	-	-	-	-	-	-
5	Wakin Chau	-	-	Jiang Yiqiao	3	-	3	-	Duo Advances	5	4	4	-	-	-
6	Na Ying	-	-	Xiao Zhan	2	-	1	-	Duo Advances	-	-	4	3	2	2
7	Huang Kaiqin	-	-	Li Ziting	4	-	4	-	-	-	-	-	-	-	-
8	Tanya Chua	-	-	Ayunga	1	-	3	-	-	-	-	-	-	-	-
9	Xu Weizhou	Fei Yu-ching	3	-	-	4	-	-	-	-	-	-	-	-	-
10	Zhou Shen	Hacken Lee	1	-	-	3	-	Duo Advances	-	1	2	1	-	3	1
11	Liu Yuning	Richie Ren	4	-	-	2	-	-	Audience Save	4	5	-	-	-	-
12	Wang Linkai	Luo Qi	2	-	-	1	-	-	-	-	-	-	-	-	-
13	Jiang Yiqiao	-	-	Wakin Chau	3	-	2	-	Duo Advances	5	4	4	-	-	-
14	Xiao Zhan	-	-	Na Ying	2	-	1	-	Duo Advances	3	3	4	3	2	2
15	Li Ziting	-	-	Huang Kaiqin	4	-	4	-	-	-	-	-	-	-	-
16	Ayanga	-	-	Tanya Chua	1	-	3	Audience Save	-	2	1	2	-	1	2
17	Angela Zhang	-	-	-	-	-	-	-	Duo Advances	3	3	-	-	-	-

== Other season information ==
The format for the other seasons is similar but may have a few small deviations. Season 2 featured guest singers Alan Tam and Li Jian that did not participate in the pair formation. Season 3 introduced one additional rookie singer to participate in each group that were eliminated if they were not able to form a partner. Season 4 introduced a new tier of "mid-generation stars" that were established singers but did not have the seniority on par with the role model singers. Similarly, any one who is not able to be paired were eliminated. Season 5 maintained a similar format to the previous season.

Season 6 led to a format shift where singers only participate in two episodes before changing focus to a different group. Five groups were used in total. Their points were tallied up and the top teams performed in the final episodes. There was no delineation between role model singers and rookie singers in this season. It is believed that the change was to help create flexible scheduling for singers and accommodate international participants like Dimash and Shila Amzah.

Season 2 Participants
	Name	Designation	Group
1	Chung Chun To	Role model singer	Group A
2	Joey Yung	Role model singer	Group A
3	Jeff Chang	Role model singer	Group A
4	Huang Qisan	Role model singer	Group A
5	Coco Lee	Role model singer	Group B
6	Sun Nan	Role model singer	Group B
7	Jordan Chan	Role model singer	Group B
8	Chang Shilei	Role model singer	Group B
9	Curley Gao	Rookie singer	Group A
10	Feng Timo	Rookie singer	Group A
11	Zhang Bichen	Rookie singer	Group A
12	Taiyi	Rookie singer	Group A
13	Zheng Yunlong	Rookie singer	Group B
14	GAI	Rookie singer	Group B
15	G.E.M.	Rookie singer	Group B
16	Roy Wang	Rookie singer	Group B
17	Alan Tam	Guest singer	-
18	Li Jian	Guest singer	-

Season 3 Participants
	Name	Designation	Group
1	George Lam	Role model singer	Group A
2	Joker Xue	Role model singer	Group A
3	Miriam Yeung	Role model singer	Group A
4	Chyi Chin	Role model singer	Group A
5	Lui Fong	Role model singer	Group B
6	Penny Tai	Role model singer	Group B
7	Wowkie Zhang	Role model singer	Group B
8	Bibi Zhou	Role model singer	Group B
9	Chien Na Lisa	Rookie singer	Group A
10	Hu Xia	Rookie singer	Group A
11	Eric Chou	Rookie singer	Group A
12	Zhang Bichen	Rookie singer	Group A
13	Sunnee Yang	Rookie singer	Group A
14	Silence Wang	Rookie singer	Group B
15	Liu Yuning	Rookie singer	Group B
16	Meng Huiyuan	Rookie singer	Group B
17	Zhai Xiaowen	Rookie Singer	Group B
18	Shan Yichun	Rookie Singer	Group B
19	Jam Hsiao	Substitute role model	Group A

Season 4 Participants
	Name	Designation	Group
1	Priscilla Chan	Role model singer	Group A
2	Steve Chou	Role model singer	Group A
3	Yang Kun	Role model singer	Group A
4	Jam Hsiao	Middle gen singer	Group A
5	An Youqi	Middle gen singer	Group A
6	Lu Hu	Middle gen singer	Group A
7	Zhang Qi	Rookie singer	Group A
8	Ma Jiaqi	Rookie singer	Group A
9	Angela An	Rookie singer	Group A
10	Terry Lin	Role model singer	Group B
11	Rainie Yang	Role model singer	Group B
12	Wowkie Zhang	Role model singer	Group B
13	Wang Siu Wan	Middle gen singer	Group B
14	Angela Hui	Middle gen singer	Group B
15	Bird Zhang	Middle gen singer	Group B
16	Meng Huiyuan	Rookie singer	Group B
17	Mikey Jiao	Rookie singer	Group B
18	Deng Jian-chao	Rookie singer	Group B

Season 5 Participants
	Name	Designation	Group
1	Wowkie Zhang	Role model singer	Group A
2	Harlem Yu	Role model singer	Group A
3	Michael Wong	Role model singer	Group A
4	A-Lin	Middle gen singer	Group A
5	Fu Longfei	Middle gen singer	Group A
7	Ma Jiaqi	Rookie singer	Group A
8	Krystal Xuan	Rookie singer	Group A
9	Mike Tsang	Rookie singer	Group A
10	Xu Ziwei	Rookie singer	Group A
11	Richie Jen	Role model singer	Group B
12	Tarcy Su	Role model singer	Group B
13	Tengger	Role model singer	Group B
14	Bai Jugang	Middle gen singer	Group B
15	Momo Wu	Middle gen singer	Group B
16	Amber Liu	Middle gen singer	Group B
17	Allen Su	Rookie singer	Group B
19	Wang Heye	Rookie singer	Group B
20	AccuseFive (Band)	Rookie singer	Group B
21	Hashizume Mika	Guest singer	-
22	Zhang Yuan	Guest singer	-

Season 6 Participants
	Name	Group
1	Stella Fang	Group A
2	Penny Tai	Group A
3	Wowkie Zhang	Group A
4	Mao Buyi	Group A
5	Liu Yuning	Group A
6	Chen Lijun	Group A
7	Michael Learns to Rock (Band)	Group A
8	Shang Wenjie	Group B
9	Lee Seung-hyun	Group B
10	Wang Likai	Group B
11	Erepat Enwer	Group B
12	Firdhaus	Group B
13	Mariah Angeliq	Group B
14	Tengger	Group C
15	Gong Linna	Group C
16	Black Panther (Band)	Group C
17	Dimash	Group C
18	Huang Xiaoyun	Group C
19	Li Quan	Group D
20	Leo Ku	Group D
21	Chen Chusheng	Group D
22	Bird Zhang	Group D
23	Allen Su	Group D
24	Ms. OOJA	Group D
25	Julia Peng	Group E
26	Shila Amzah	Group E
27	Wang Heye	Group E
28	Yuexin Wang	Group E
29	Zhang Bichen	Group E
30	Zhang Xincheng	Group E

== Reception ==
In China, the first season garnered critical success. According to the Weibo Variety statistics, the show's main topic board received over 7.3 billion views. Including the collective subcategories on Weibo, the Singing with Legends topic received a collective 17.7 billion views after the show finished airing.

Singing with Legends received international attention. In October 2020, season 1 of the show was debuted at the Cannes International Series Festival in France to positive reception. The producers signed the rights to use the show's format in Germany (Sony Pictures Entertainment), Spain (Grupo Granga), USA (Warner Bros.), Italy (Garbo Produzionis), France (Groupe Hervé Hubert), and Vietnam.

Of these countries, Spain released "Dúos increíbles" to channel LA1 of TVE in 2022. The winners of this show received a trophy and 25,000 euros to donate to an NGO. Spain employed a team of 23 musicians playing live in each episode on par with the original Chinese show. "Dúos increíbles" also aired a second season in 2023. Vietnam released the second international adaptation with "Bài hát của chúng ta" (Our Song Vietnam) in 2024 with similar success.

== Awards ==
Year	Organization	Award	Results
2019	Variety Annual Influential Ceremony	Programs of the Year	Won
2020	4th Mobile Influence Summit Forum and Release Conference	Most Influential TV Variety Show	Won
2020	Sina Entertainment Awards	Top 10 Variety Shows	Won
2020	The 26th Shanghai TV Festival Magnolia Awards	Best TV Variety Show	Nominated
