= Super–Vocal season 2 =

2019 Chinese television seasons

This is a list of episodes of Super-Vocal Season 2 in 2019. Super-Vocal Season 2 started broadcast on Hunan TV on July 19, 2019.

== Singers ==
Name	Vocal Range	Amount of Principal Recommendations
Fang Xiaodong	Baritone	
Wang Minhui	Tenor	
Zhao Fanjia	Tenor	
Zhao Chaofan	Tenor	
Zha Xidunzhu	Baritone	
Zheng Yibin	Tenor	
Xu Kai	Baritone	
Yang Haochen	Tenor	
Guo Hongxu	Tenor	
Aladin	Tenor	
Yin Yuke	Countertenor	1
Zhou Qi	Baritone	
Liu Quanjun	Baritone	
Song Yuhang	Baritone	
Yin Haolun		
Liu Yan	Tenor	1
Zhang Bojun	Tenor	
Hu Chaozheng	Baritone	
Xu Junshuo	Tenor	3
Zheng Qiyuan	Tenor	2
Zhao Yue	Tenor	2
He Yilin	Baritone	2
He Liangchen	Baritone	3
Wang Jiaxin	Baritone	
Hu Hao	Tenor	
Yuan Guangquan	Baritone	
Zhou Shiyuan	Bass	
Yu Hua	Baritone	
Huang Mingyu	Baritone	
Dong Pan	Bass	1
Dai Chen	Tenor	
Zhao Yi	Tenor	
Mao Er	Tenor	
Wang Shang	Tenor	
Zhang Yingxi	Tenor	3
Cui Yuefeng	Baritone	

== Episodes ==
Episode #	Broadcast Date	Format	Principal Performances	Understudy Performances	Final Principals
S02E01	July 19, 2019	The members introduce themselves and perform a song for the producers. If an Understudy receives three Principal stamps, they choose a Principal member to challenge. Six of them are chosen to be Principal members.	All members performed a song of their choice for the producers.		He Liangchen Xu Junshuo Dong Pan Liu Yan Yin Yuke Zhang Yingxi
S02E02	July 26, 2019	The members introduce themselves and perform a song for the producers. If an Understudy receives three Principal stamps, they choose a Principal member to challenge. Six of them are chosen to be Principal members.	All members performed a song of their choice for the producers.		He Liangchen Xu Junshuo Dong Pan Liu Yan Yin Yuke Zhang Yingxi
S02E03	August 2, 2019	The six Principal members each choose an Understudy member to sing a duet with. Both members need a Principal recommendation to become Principal members. In the event that more than three groups are chosen as Principals, one of the Principal groups is challenged for their spot in a solo battle.	Xu Junshuo and Zheng Qiyuan "La Gloire a Mes Genoux" He Liangchen and He Yilin "Standchen" Dong Pan and Yuan Guangquan "Moscow Nights" Liu Yan and Zhou Qi "Ache" Yin Yuke and Zhou Shiyuan "I, I" Zhang Yingxi and Zhao Yue "Caruso"		Xu Junshuo Zheng Qiyuan He Liangchen He Yilin Zhang Yingxi Zhao Yue
S02E04	August 9, 2019	The Understudy members each choose someone they want to sing a duet with. If both members of a duet choose each other, they are able to compete for a spot on the stage. One group is chosen to compete against the Principal members. The three Principal duets compete with the Understudy duet for 6 Principal spots. In the event that more than three groups are chosen as Principals, one of the Principal groups is challenged for their spot in a solo battle.	Xu Junshuo and Zheng Qiyuan "That Time" Zhang Yingxi and Zhao Yue "Funiculi, Funicula" He Liangchen and He Yilin "Can't Help Falling in Love With You"	Mao Er and Guo Hongxu "To Roam About"	Xu Junshuo Zheng Qiyuan Zhang Yingxi Zhao Yue He Liangchen He Yilin
S02E05	August 16, 2019	Principals are paired into groups, and choose two Understudy members. The Understudy member that performs the best with the Principal group will be chosen to form a trio with them. The chosen Understudy members then perform a solo to see which trios will move forward.	He Liangchen, He Yilin, and Dai Chen "One Day of the Spring" He Liangchen, He Yilin, and Liu Yan "Who am I Indeed" Xu Junshuo, Zheng Qiyuan, and Wang Shang "How Far I'll Go" Xu Junshuo, Zheng Qiyuan, and Hu Chaozheng "Haled's Song About Love" Zhang Yinxi, Zhao Yue, and Guo Hongxu "The Power of the Time" Zhang Yinxi, Zhao Yue, and Zhao Yi "Musica Che Resta"	Liu Yan "Sea" Hu Chaozheng "Broken Light" Guo Hongxu "Mattinata"	Xu Junshuo Zheng Qiyuan Hu Chaozheng Zhang Yinxi Zhao Yue Guo Hongxu
S02E06	August 23, 2019	The Principal members are split into separate teams for a solo, duet, and trio. The Understudy members choose whether they want to sing a solo, duet, or trio, and their groups are chosen by the producers. The groups then chose amongst each other the order of competition, and competed to have the chance to perform with the producers.	Zhao Yue and Zhang Yinxi "By the Water" Guo Hongxu "Don't Cry For Me Argentina" Xu Junshuo, Zheng Qiyuan, Hu Chaozheng "Nothing Serious"	Dai Chen and Yi Haolun "All' Idea di Quel Metallo" Dong Pan "Let's Start From Here" Zha Xidunzhu, Zhao Chaofan, and Zheng Yibin "This is Me"	Zhao Yue Zhang Yinxi Xu Junshuo He Liangchen Zheng Yiquan Dong Pan
S02E07	August 30, 2019	The winning Principal teams performed with the producers. Afterwards, the Understudies were divided into teams of six each, and randomly assigned performance structures. A live audience was also invited to give their opinions on whether a group should be an Apprentice or Understudy group. After the six performances, the position suggestions were given out. Teams with three Principal recommendations compete in a solo challenge for the final Principal position.	Zhao Yue, Zhang Yinxi, and Liao Chanyong "O Sole Mio" Xu Junshuo, He Liangchen, and Shang Wenjie "Ode to Spring" Zheng Qiyuan, Dong Pan, and A-Mei "If Only" Dong Pan, Xu Kai, Mao Er, and Yang Haochen "Piano Man" He Liangchen and Hu Hao "Mi Manchi" Dai Chen, Zhang Bojun, and Xu Junshuo "Become Better" Zhao Yue, Zhao Yi, and Zhou Qi "Vincinissimo" Liu Yan and Zheng Qiyuan "One Day" Zhang Yinxi, Yuan Guanquan, Wang Shang, and Huang Mingyu "Santa Lucia"		Zheng Qiyuan Liu Yan Yu Hua Hu Chaozheng Zheng Yibin Zhao Chaofan
S02E08	September 6, 2019	Each team is paired up with a singer from Season 1 of Super-Vocal after a betting process. Each group gave a performance, except for the Principal group from last season, which gave two. After the six performances, the position suggestions were given out. Teams with three Principal recommendations compete in a solo challenge for the final Principal position.	Liu Yan, Hu Chaozheng, Zheng Yibin, and Zhao Chaofan "There is Nowhere That Love Can't Go" Dai Chen, Fang Xiaodong, and Jia Fan "Autumn Day" He Yilin, Aladin, and Ma Jia "I Surrender" Dong Pan, Wang Minhui, and Ju Hongchuan "Know or Not" Zhao Yue, Wang Jiaxin, and Tong Zhuo "Cranberry Flowers" Zhaxi Dunzhu, Zhao Fanjia, and Gao Tianhe "Live for Music" Yu Hua, Zheng Qiyuan, and Cai Chengyu "Don't Stop Believin'"		Zhang Bojun Liu Quanjun Dai Chen Fang Xiaodong Xu Junshuo Yin Haolun
S02E9	September 13, 2019	The mothers of members who have never been Principals reunite with their sons with a home-cooked meal. All groups perform a quartet, with the Principal group from last season also performing a duet. After the six performances, the position suggestions were given out. Teams with three Principal recommendations compete in a solo challenge for the final Principal position.	Zhang Bojun and Liu Quanjun "Bachelor's Vegetable Store" He Liangchen, Hu Chaozheng, Cui Yuefeng, and Song Yuhang "Half Moon in the Sky" Xu Junshuo, Dai Chen, Yin Haolun, and Fang Xiaodong "Believer" Dong Pan, Guo Hongxu, Xu Kai, and Wang Minhui "Drawing" Zhang Yinxi, Zhaxi Dunzhu, Yuan Guangquan, and Zhao Fanjia "Writing's on the Wall" Zhao Yue, Zhou Shiyuan, Zhou Qi, and Zhao Yi "Give Me a Ride" Zheng Qiyuan, Hu Chaozheng, Zheng Yibin, and Zhao Chaofan "You Will Be Found"		Zhang Yinxi Yuan Guangquan Zhaxi Dunzhu Zhao Fanjia Wang Shang Huang Mingyu
S02E10	September 20, 2019	The teams all play rounds of Eagle and Chickens to determine who will go first in the next performance round. Wu Bixia was featured as a guest producer in the place of Liao Chanyong. All groups perform, with the Principal group from last season getting an extra performance. After the six performances, the position suggestions were given out. Teams with three Principal recommendations compete in a solo challenge for the final Principal position.	Zhang Yinxi and Yuan Guangquan "Colorful Birds and Clouds" He Liangchen, Hu Hao, and He Yilin "Odissea" Dong Pan and Guo Hongxu "By the Love Riverside" Dai Chen, Xu Junshuo, and Fang Xiaodong "Like Waking Up From Dreams" Zheng Qiyuan, Zheng Yibin, Yu Hua, and Zhao Chaofan "Hibernate" Zhaxi Dunzhu, Zhao Fanjia, Wang Shang, and Huang Mingyu "Looking Up" Zhou Qi and Zhao Yi "No Matter What"		Dong Pan Guo Hongxu Xu Kai Wang Minhui Mao Er Yang Haochen
S02E11	September 27, 2019	The four winning Principal teams randomly choose their performance order. In the first round, each Principal team sends out one performance. The Understudies then choose their favorite performance.. In the second round, two teams go up against each other, with the most favored team being able to choose their competitor. The third round has the two winners from the second round competing in solos. The winning Principal team moves directly to the final round. The producers each choose two other members to move on to the final round.	Yuan Guangquan and Huang Mingyu "Heart Love" Xu Junshuo and Zhang Bojun "The Reason I'm Single" Liu Yan, Hu Chaozheng, Yu Hua, and Zhao Chaofan "I Feel Awkward" Mao Er, Wang Minhui, Xu Kai, and Yang Haochen "Who is the TIme" Zhang Yinxi, Zhaxi Dunzhu, Zhao Fanjia, and Wang Shang "Aurora" Dong Pan and Guo Hongxu "True Heart" Liu Quanjun, Dai Chen, Fang Xiaodong, and Yin Haolun "New Direction" Zheng Qiyuan and Zhao Yibin "To the Ordinary Meetings of the Big World" Dai Chen "Che Gelida Manina" Yuan Guangquan "Dark Eyes"		Guo Hongxu Zhang YinXi Dai Chen He Liangcheng Xu Junshuo Zheng Qiyuan
