= In Search of Lost Time (film) =

2022 film by Derek Yee

- Film poster
- Traditional Chinese: 海的盡頭是草原
- Simplified Chinese: 海的尽头是草原
- Hanyu Pinyin: Hǎi Dě Jìntóu Shì Cǎoyuán
- Directed by: Derek Yee
- Written by: Shang Yang; Shi Ling; Derek Yee; Li Miao
- Produced by: Bai Jie; Jiang Defu
- Starring: Chen Baoguo; Ma Su; Ayanga; Wang Qiang
- Production companies: Inner Mongolia Film Group Co., Ltd.; Bona Film Group Limited; Huaxia Film Distribution Co., Ltd.; Alibaba Pictures
- Distributed by: Inner Mongolia Film Group Co., Ltd.; Shanghai Bona Culture Media Co., Ltd.; Beijing Bona International Cinema Investment Management Co., Ltd.
- Release date: 9 September 2022 (China)
- Running time: 124 minutes
- Country: China
- Languages: Mandarin; Mongolian

In Search of Lost Time (Chinese: 海的尽头是草原) is a 2022 Chinese historical drama film co-written and directed by Derek Yee and starring Chen Baoguo, Ma Su, Ayanga, and Wang Qiang. Based on real events of "Three Thousand Orphans Entering Inner Mongolia", the film is about a group of nearly 3,000 junior orphans who were sent to the Mongolian grasslands to be adopted by nomadic families. The film premiered in China on 9 September 2022.

== Cast ==
- Chen Baoguo as Du Sihan
- Ai Mi as young Du Siheng
  - Luo Yichun as childhood Du Siheng
  - Badema as old Du Siheng
- Ma Su as Sa Renna
- Ayanga as Edel
- Wang Qiang as Namu Khan
- Luo Yichun
- Wu Yufang as Kang, Women's Federation Director
- Wang Churan as young Zhang Fengxia
  - Li Bin as old Zhang Fengxia
- Huang Yao as Zhao Mingna
- Xu Huanshan as Deng Xianfeng
  - Bai Yufan as young Deng Xianfeng
- Zhang Ming'en as Du Yi
- Ding Chengxin as Ma Zhengyuan
- Bayin
- Batdorj-in Baasanjab

== Production ==
Shooting began on 15 April 2021 at Hengdian World Studios and took place in various locations including Hohhot, Xilingol League, and Wulagai Ranch, and wrapped on August 9.

== Release ==
In Search of Lost Time was theatrically released on 9 September 2022 in China.

== Reception ==
Douban, a major Chinese media rating site, gave the film a rating of 7.2 out of 10.

Derek Elley of Sino-Cinema gave the film a rating of 4/10. Commenting on the use of flashbacks, the reviewer argues that "the film as a whole would have worked so much better, and developed some emotional power, if it had been set entirely in the past." The review continues: "The heavily desaturated colour used for the flashbacks hardly impinges on the film’s clean, handsome look. However, the portrayal of 1960s Inner Mongolia is standard generic, with a well-laundered look, happy grasslands life and lots of local ethnic colour (nomad games etc.). The score by Hong Kong’s prolific Jin Peida 金培达 [Peter Kam] is gentle and respectful, with an ethnic flavour, and supports rather than invigorates the leisurely pacing."

The review on the website howardforfilm.com reads in part: "The director makes use of colour to evoke the hardships of the past. Shanghai is grey and rainy, while Inner Mongolia has a washed out palette of greys and beiges. Unfortunately, that makes it a bit tough to read the subtitles, which are in white. Yee also throws in a lot of expository dialogue in the story’s first act to bring the audience up to speed on the conditions that may have led to the government sending these children to the middle of nowhere. On the plus side, the performances are all good, especially those by the Mongolian actors. The casting is excellent, too, with the actors playing Siheng and Sihan looking like they could be brother and sister." The review concludes: "While IN SEARCH OF LOST TIME runs a bit long for what it is (it’s just over two hours), it’s not bad as long as you don’t mind the revisionist history lesson. At least you’ll get to see how beautiful the Mongolian grassland is."

== Accolades ==
Chen Baoguo won the Golden Lotus Award for Best Actor at the 14th Macau International Movie Festival in 2022.

The film won Best Asian Chinese Language Film at the 2023 Hong Kong Film Awards.
