= Super Vocal =

Chinese musical group

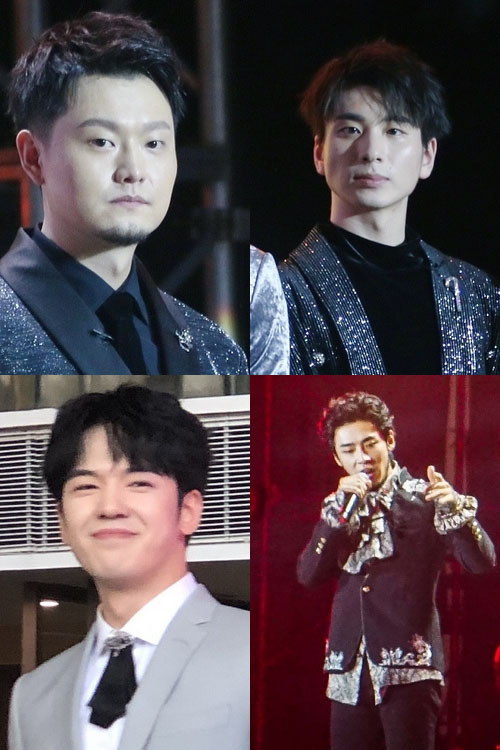
- clockwise from top left: Ju Hongchuan, Cai Chengyu, Gao Tianhe, and Tong Zhuo

Background information
- Origin: China
- Genres: Bel canto; Classical crossover; Operatic pop
- Years active: 2019 - present
- Label: Decca Records
- Members: Ju Hongchuan; Cai Chengyu; Gao Tianhe; Tong Zhuo

Super Vocal (Chinese: 声入人心男团), is a Chinese bel canto quartet with a line-up consisting of Ju Hongchuan, Cai Chengyu, Gao Tianhe and Tong Zhuo.

The music label Decca announced the official formation of the first Chinese male bel canto group named "Super Vocal” at the Decca 90 Anniversary Event. The celebration took place December 4, 2019 at the Beijing National Centre for the Performing Arts. The group was disbanded in June 2020 due to Tong Zhuo and Gao Tianhe's scandals.

== Members ==
Members	Birthday	Hometown	Colleges	Part
Ju Hongchun	February 22, 1993	Ürümqi, Xinjiang Uygur Autonomous Region, China	Central Conservatory of Music	Baritone
Cai Chengyu	January 17, 1998	Suzhou City, Anhui Province, China	Shanghai Conservatory of Music	Tenor
Gao Tianhe	July 26, 1993	Harbin City, Heilongjiang Province, China	Tianjin Conservatory of Music	Countertenor
Tong Zhuo	May 20, 1994	Linfen City, Shanxi Province, China	The Central Academy of Drama	Baritone

== Group formation ==
The first season of the Hunan Satellite TV show Super-Vocal premiered on November 2, 2018, with the season finale airing January 18, 2019. A total of 36 singers from 25 universities participated.

At the beginning of 2019, singers Tongzhuo, Gao Tianhe, Ju Hongchuan, Cai Chengyu, Zhang Chao and Dai Wei signed with Hunan Satellite TV.

Gao Tianhe joined "Day Day Up" as an intern host. Gao passed the internship assessment with perfect scores, successfully becoming a member of the "Day Day Brothers". Tong Zhuo was a guest host and participant in the TV game show “Happy Camp”. He also participated in the TV shows "Magic Chinese Characters", "Chinese Restaurant Season Three". Ju Hongchuan and Cai Chengyu attended multiple Hunan Satellite TV events. They also released their own singles.

All four members of the group Super Vocal appeared on the Hunan Satellite TV show Super-Vocal. Among them Cai Chengyu, Gao Tianhe and Tong Zhuo were the finalists on the show.

== Career ==
On November 8, 2019, Super Vocal released their first single, Mandarin version of the song "Into the Unknown" (未知的真相), title track of the Disney animation Frozen II. On November 12, Super Vocal performed the song live during the Frozen II Chinese premiere, taking place at the Shanghai Walt Disney Theatre.

In March 2020, Super Vocal participated in Hunan Satellite TV's "Singer 2020" during the fourth round of surprise knockout challenges. They performed their new original single "Ni De Se Cai" (你的色彩, English: Your Colors, Italian: Qui con me) and won the challenge against Xiao Jingteng, obtaining the official qualification for replacement.

The studio version of “Your Colors” was released on March 27, 2020. “Your Colors” is the leading single for the group's debut album which is set to release in the year 2020. The song was composed by two-time Emmy nominee Roxanne Seeman, Ivo Moring, George Komsky, Italian lyrics was written by Saverio Principini, and Chinese lyrics written by Cheng He. The song was produced by Nick Patrick and Wu Qinglong.

In the breakout round broadcast on April 17, Super Vocal performed Lin Zhixuan's "Never Left" and lost to Yuan Yawei.

=== Tong and Gao's Scandals, disbandment ===
On May 22, 2020, in a live-streaming, Tong Zhuo revealed that after he failed to be admitted by his dream school People's Liberation Army Academy of Art in his first attempt of Gaokao, in the next academic year, he used some methods to change his status from a second time taker to a first time taker because People's Liberation Army Academy of Art only accepted fresh high school graduates who took the Gaokao for the first time. However, he still did not make to his dream school and finally enrolled to the Central Academy of Drama. The criticism of him conducting fraud arose online in the following days and the relevant authorities started to investigate the issue. According to the local government, Tong's step-father Tong Tianfeng, who was the Vice-Secretary of standing committee of NPC of Linfen city, used his influence to illegally change the studying identity of Tong Zhuo in 2012. The relevant government officials were disciplined and Tong's certificate of the Central Academy of Drama was disqualified. On June 22, Hunan TV issued a statement indicating that it had ended the contract with Tong Zhuo.

On June 26, 2020, the netizen noticed that Gao Tianhe was removed from the posters of "Day Day Up" and Gao's scene was then deleted from "Day Day Up" aired on June 28. There was an accusation online from a candidate in the same exam room that Gao has cheated in the written exam of the Qualification Examination for National Radio and Television Editors, Journalists, Broadcasters and Hosts in 2019. On June 29, Hunan TV confirmed the accusation was true and disqualified his result. Gao Tianhe left Hunan TV, too.

Although no official statements were issued by Hunan TV or Universal Music about the disbandment of Super Vocal, "a member of super vocal" was removed from all's Sina Weibo account certification and the four has never appear together since then.
