= Shanghai International Arts Festival =

Arts festival in Shanghai, China

Shanghai International Arts Festival is the only national-level comprehensive international arts festival in the People's Republic of China, held once a year.

== Description ==
This festival is organized by the Ministry of Culture and Tourism of the People's Republic of China and hosted by the Shanghai Municipal Government. The inaugural China Shanghai International Arts Festival opened at the Shanghai Grand Theatre on November 2, 1999.

The events held at this edition of the China Shanghai International Arts Festival are primarily focused on stage performing arts. Due to the impact of the COVID-19 pandemic, the Shanghai International Arts Festival in China was suspended from 2020 to 2022.
