= Ayanga =

Chinese theatre actor and singer

- 阿云嘎 ᠠᠶᠤᠩᠭ᠎ᠠ
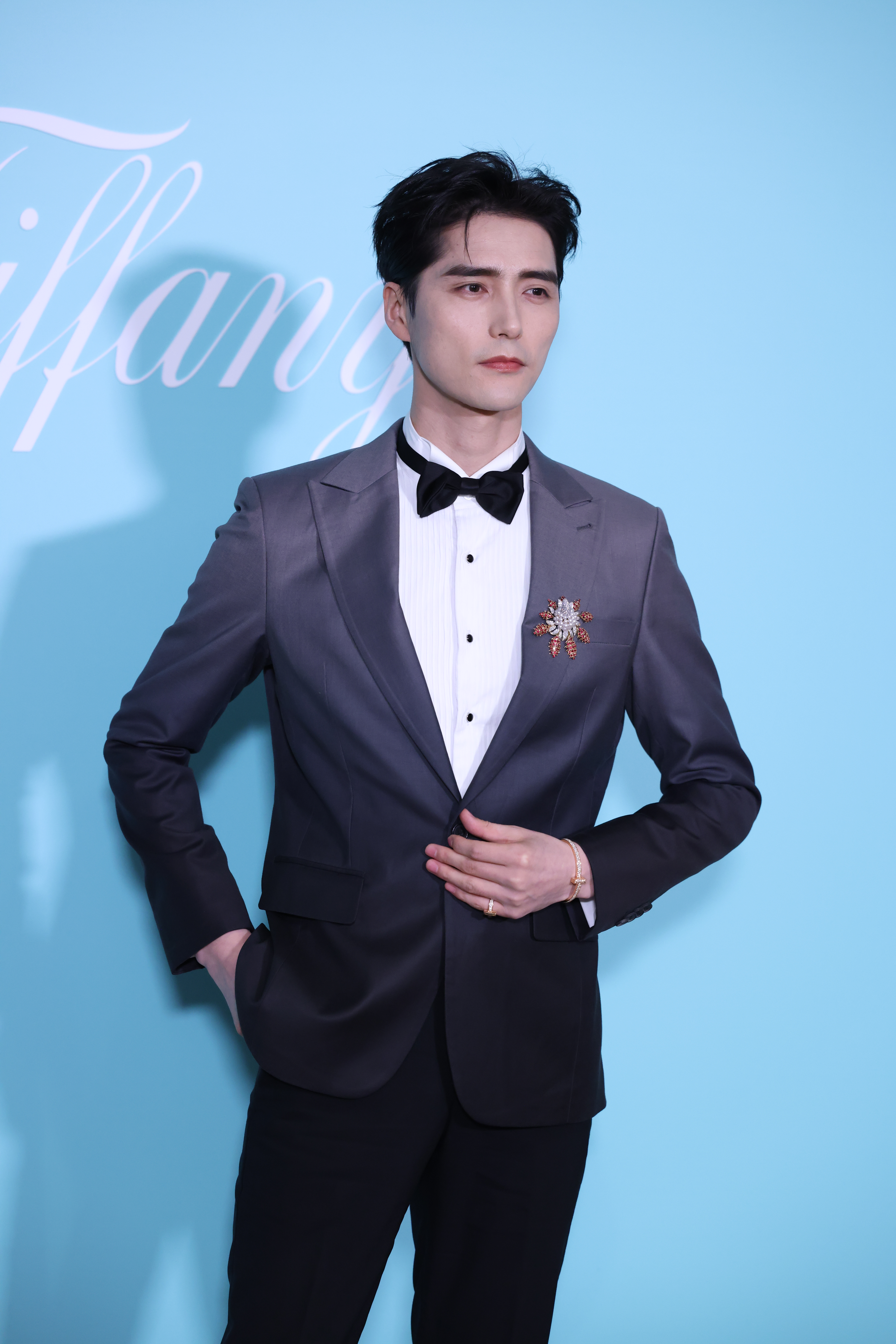
- Ayanga at an event by Tiffany & Co, 2023
- Born: 23 October 1989 (age 36); Ordos City, Inner Mongolia, China
- Education: Beijing Dance Academy
- Occupations: Theatre actor; Singer; Actor
- Years active: 2012–present
- Musical career
- Genres: Pop; R&B; Classical; Folk music
- Instruments: Vocals; Piano; Guitar

Chinese name
- Simplified Chinese: 阿云嘎
- Traditional Chinese: 阿雲嘎
Transcriptions
Standard Mandarin
- Hanyu Pinyin: Āyúngā

Mongolian name
- Mongolian Cyrillic: Аянга
- Mongolian script: ᠠᠶᠤᠩᠭ᠎ᠠ

Ayanga (Note: Chinese: 阿云嘎; pinyin: Āyúngā; Mongolian: Аянга, traditional script:ᠠᠶᠤᠩᠭ᠎ᠠ) (born 23 October 1989) is a Chinese theatre actor, singer, and songwriter of Mongolian ethnic background from Ordos City, Inner Mongolia, China.

== Early life ==
Ayanga was born in Ordos City, Inner Mongolia, China. His parents were sheep herders and died before he turned seven. He was raised by his older brother who was 20 years older. He received education in Mongolian and spoke little Mandarin when he was young. He was sent to the Ikezhao League Art School around age 12. He was accepted into the Inner Mongolian PLA Song and Dance Troupe at the age of 14.

He did not remain complacent with his career path, so he travelled to Beijing to pursue his dream in art and performance at the age of 17. He was admitted into the prestigious Beijing Dance Academy and majored in musical theatre. In his senior year, his older brother died. After graduating from college, he joined the Beijing Opera and Dance Theater and became a musical theatre actor and a singer. In 2021, Ayanga was honored as a Distinguished Teacher by his alma mater Beijing Dance Academy.

== Career ==
In 2012, Ayanga starred in an original musical entitled Kunlun Myth, which was based on the theme of intangible cultural heritage Kunlun mythology, playing Sauran and Pangu. The same year, he also starred in the original musical Tianqiao, directed by Tian Qinxin, playing Lin Pengfei. Recommended by Tian Qinxin, Ayanga joined the Beijing Song and Dance Theater as a solo actor after graduating from the Beijing Dance Academy.

In 2013, Ayanga participated in the Chinese musical Nasirdin Afandi. The same year, he participated in The Third Inner Mongolia Young Singer TV Competition and won the first prize for mainstream singing. In 2014, he won the third prize of the "Wenhua Award" popular group in the national vocal competition. In 2014, Ayanga participated in the Anhui TV's reality show Mr. Super which he won the championship; and the CCTV-3 music reality show Rising Star China which he emerged as runner-up.

In June 2015, Ayanga released his first solo single, "Thank You". On 31 December of the same year, Ayanga held a concert with the title "The Return of The Thunder God" in Ordos City, which was his first solo concert since his debut. He also participated in the musical The Legend and the dance drama History in the Song.

In February 2016, Ayanga participated in the CCTV New Year's Gala for the first time, along with Jiang Xin, Wu Yingwei and others. The same year, he co-starred in the web drama Weapon & Soul. In December, he held a concert with Zhaxi Dunzhu titled "Two Heroes Battle" which was broadcast on CCTV. He also released his first solo album Shartal Grassland.

In 2017, Ayanga starred in the Chinese musical A Moment of Remembrance; as well as the musical My Bucket List. His second solo concert Sing Your Heart Out was broadcast on CCTV-15. The same year, he also participated in several important occasions, including the closing ceremony of the 13th National Games; the closing ceremony of the 26th China Golden Rooster and Hundred Flowers Film Festival and the Sino-Russian Artists Gala.

In February 2018, Ayanga's third concert, Peak Musical Concert, was broadcast on CCTV-15. The same year he played Namuhai in the television series The Story of My Parents' Youth directed by Kang Honglei. Ayanga then participated in Hunan Television's music reality show Super–Vocal and emerged as one of the six final winners. Together with Zheng Yunlong, Frank Ju and Cai Chengyu (collectively known as the Super-Vocal Boys group), he participated in Hunan Television's singing contest show Singer 2019 and emerged as the 2nd runner up of the season.

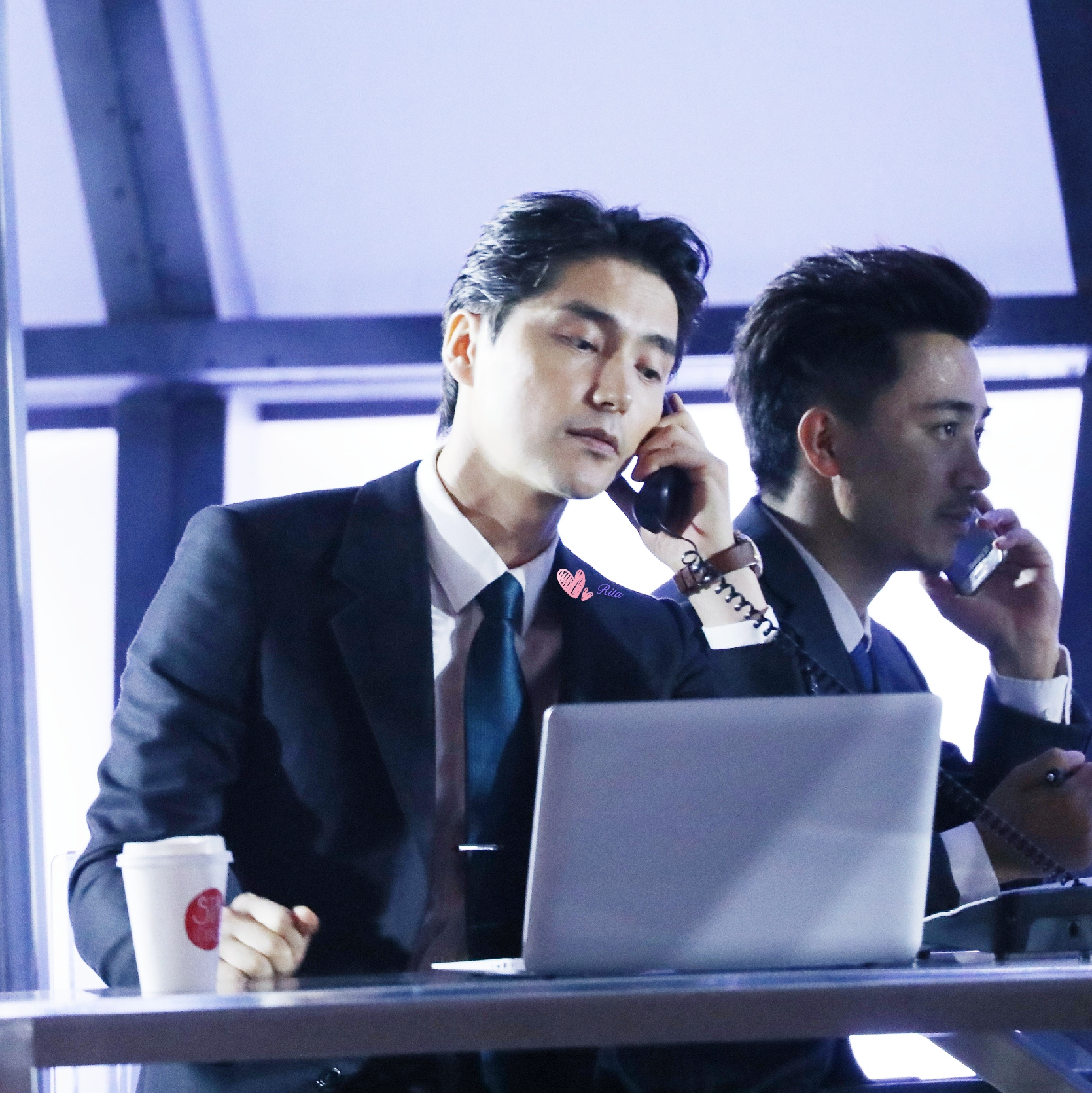
Ayanga playing Antonio in the adapted play The Merchant of Venice, 2019

On 4 February 2019, he participated in the CCTV New Year's Gala and sang the song "Building a Chinese Dream Together". The same year, he starred in the play The Merchant of Venice playing Antonio. Forbes China listed Ayanga under their 30 Under 30 Asia 2019 list which consisted of 30 influential people under 30 years old who have had a substantial effect in their fields. From 2019 to 2020, he joined Dragon TV's singing variety program Our Song.

In 2020, Ayanga appeared in CCTV New Year's Gala, performing the song "Dear China" alongside Jiang Dawei and several other veteran artists. On 23 July, Ayanga released his first musical album titled The Art. On 13 November, he announced that he will play the lead role, Yao Yuan, in the original musical On the Road, which tells the story of China's vast number of delivery men, the backbone of the express mail industry.

In February 2021, Ayanga participated in the CCTV New Year's Gala and sang the song "瑞雪平安图" together with Cecilia Han, Tia Ray and Karry Wang. He then performed the song "Centennial" with Liao Changyong and Cai Chengyu in the CCTV Lantern Festival Gala. The same year, he also participated in several important occasions, including the CCTV National Day Gala and 2022 Beijing Winter Olympics 100 days countdown. In November, he announced that he will star as Romeo in the Chinese version of the French musical Romeo and Juliet.

On 26 January 2022, Ayanga was appointed the head of the first state-owned musical theatre troupe in China. In February, he participated in the CCTV New Year's Gala and performed the item "Memories of Southern China" together with Aska Yang and various artists. He then joined the musical variety program The City of Musicals as one of the mentors. In July, he joined the variety E-Pop of China. He starred in In Search of Lost Time as one of the main leads and also participated in the Bilibili produced voice actor show Voice Monsters as the stage director. In November, he announced his second EP Four Dreams in Linchuan which makes reference to a collection of four major dramas by the famed Ming-dynasty dramatist Tang Xianzu. He produced and starred in the Chinese version of the musical The Count of Monte Cristo, which commenced in December. On 30 December, he announced he will act as the Phantom in the Chinese version of the musical The Phantom of the Opera which will begin touring mid 2023.

== Theatre ==
Year	Production	Role(s)	Location
2011	Rent	Angel	Beijing
2012	Kunlun Myth 昆仑神话	Sorlang, Pangu	Beijing
2012	Platform Bridge 天桥	Lin Pengfei	Beijing
2013–2014	Nasirdin Afandi 纳斯尔丁 阿凡提	Prince	Shanghai, Hangzhou, Suzhou, Nanjing, Xiamen, Beijing
2017	A Moment of Remembrance 阿尔兹记忆的愛情	Wu Zhizhe	Beijing
2017–2018	My Bucket List 我的遗愿清单	Yang Xiaoyu	Beijing, Shanghai
2019	The Merchant of Venice	Antonio	Shanghai
2020–2021	On The Road 在远方	Yao Yuan	Beijing, Shanghai, Guangzhou, Changsha
2021–2022	Romeo & Juliette	Romeo	Shanghai, Beijing
2022–	The Count of Monte Cristo	The Count of Monte Cristo (Edmond Dantès)	Shanghai, Beijing, Guangzhou
2023	The Phantom of the Opera	the Phantom (Erik)	

== Discography ==
=== Studio albums ===
- Shartal Grassland (希拉草原) – 2016

Song title	Language
"Shartal Grassland" (希拉草原)	Mongolian
"The Horsemen's Pride" (马背豪情)	Chinese
"Waiting for Your Return" (等你归来)	Mongolian
"Ergun River" (额尔古纳河)	Chinese
"Missing You" (思念)	Chinese
"Mongolian Incense" (蒙古香)	Chinese
"Song of Marrying Off a Daughter" (送亲歌)	Mongolian
"The Hometown of my Life" (生命的故乡)	Chinese
"Gratitude" (感谢)	Chinese

- Immortal·THE ART (不朽的·THE ART) – 2020

No.	Song title
01.	"Immortal" (不朽的)
02.	"Love island" (心岛)
03.	"Under the Cherry Tree" (樱桃树下)
04.	"Namida" (娜米达)
05.	"The Alchemist" (牧羊少年)
06.	"2021: A Space Odyssey" (2021太空漫游)
07.	"Let It Go" (被雨淋湿的人)
08.	"The Metamorphosis" (变形记)
09.	"A Grand Disillusionment" (华丽世界的幻觉<)
10.	"Waste My Time With You" (我等了你五十一年九个月零四天)

*Disc 2 has been released in October 2020

=== EPs ===
- Ni Guang Er Xing (逆光而行四部曲) – 2019

Song title
"Home" (家)
"Room of Eight and a Half Steps" (八步半的房间)
"Brave" (无畏)
"Be Together with the Country" (和祖国在一起)

- Four Dreams in Linchuan (临川四梦) – 2022

Song title
"A Dream" (一梦)
"As Wish" (若愿)
"Play in Painting" (画中戏)
"Nothing" (无本)

=== Singles ===
Year	English title	Chinese title	Album/Description	Notes
2013	"Never Say Goodbye"	没有说再见	Drama Happy Wife Growing Up OST	
2014	"Room of Eight and a Half Steps"	八步半的房间		Written by Ayanga.
2015	"Distant Glimmer"	远曦	Short film Father OST	In Mongolian.
2015	"Summer Like This"	这样的夏天	Drama Tea Love OST	
2016	"Moon of the Border"	边城月	Drama Border Town Prodigal OST	
2017	"Flowers Falling Outside the City"	落花城外	Movie Mao Pai Nan Shen Meng Nu Xia OST	
2017	"A Toast To Red Color Gentleness"	敬你一杯红色温柔	Variety Let's Set Off Now Theme Song	
2017	"Returning Swallow"	归燕	Drama A Life Time Love OST	
2017	"The Current Me and the Past You"	現在的我曾經的你	Recorded in the Album Our Home	
2018	"Forever Birch Forest"	永远的白桦林	Hebei Luanping Promotion Song	
2018	"Light of Love"	光之心	Variety Super Vocal Theme Song	With 8 participants of Super Vocal.
2018	"River of Empress Dowager Xiao"	萧太后河		
2018	"Reborn"	重生	Drama The City of the Family OST	
2019	"Never Say Goodbye"	不说再见		With Liao Changyong and the participants of Super Vocal.
2019	"Persistent Dream"	执着的梦	Cartoon The Leader OST	
2019	"The Twins"	双生	Drama The Twins OST	
2019	"May We"	愿我们		
2019	"Sunshine Love"	爱的阳光	Charity Song	
2019	"What My Heart Desires"	我心所向	Beijing Performing Arts Group 10 Years Anniversary Song	
2019	"Calabash Brothers"	葫芦娃		With Frank Ju, Cai Chengyu and Zheng Yunlong.
2019	"War Horse"	秣马	Drama Novoland: Eagle Flag OST	
2019	"Our Beijing"	你我的北京		
2019	"Four years Old Bay Dun Horse"	四岁的海骝马	Drama The Story of My Parents' Youth OST	In Mongolian.
2019	"Separation at Qinghe"	清河诀	Drama The Untamed OST	
2019	"We Are All Nocturnal Wanders"	都是夜归人	Movie Midnight Diner OST	With Zheng Yunlong.
2019	"Above The Clouds"	步云	MMORPG game Swords of Legends Online song	
2019	"Peace and Love"	和平与爱	7th CISM Military World Games Promotion Song	With Cao Fujia.
2019	"For the Glory"	巅峰荣耀	Movie The King's Avatar (2017 web series): For the Glory OST	With Zheng Yunlong.
2019	"You Like This"	这样的你	Variety Take Girls Home Theme Song	
2019	"Dream Guarder"	守梦人	Recorded in the Album Sound of China	With Li Qi.
2019	"Vast Grasslands"	野草茫茫	Drama Ji Dang OST	
2019	"Winter Without You"	没有你的冬季	Movie Somewhere Winter OST	
2019	"Beautiful Girl"	娇阿依	2019 China Federation of Literary and Art Circles Poverty Alleviation Song	
2019	"Contemporary Poet"	当代诗人	Drama The Best Partner OST	
2020	"Sail"	扬起的帆		With Wang Xi and Zhang Yingxi.
2020	"Glory"	光荣	Drama The Glorious Era OST	With Liu Yan.
2020	"Wind Voyager"	风之旅人	Drama Ever Night 2 OST	
2020	"Want To Tell You Something"	要告诉你一件事情	Drama New World OST	
2020	"Heart Warms Heart Equals to the World"	心暖心等于世界	Charity song	
2020	"A Chinese Ghost Story"	倩女幽魂：人间情	Movie The Enchanting Phantom OST	
2020	"Journey of the Mind"	心路	Drama Burning OST	
2020	"Shared Destiny"	命运与共和	Charity song	With various artists.
2020	"Lover's Curse"	情人咒	Drama Love and Redemption OST	With Yisa Yu.
2020	"The Peach Blossom Land"	桃源	MOBA game Honor of Kings Liu Bei Character Song	
2020	"Sunshine in Winter Olympics"	冬奥阳光		
2020	"The People Above All"	人民至上	Drama Heroes in Harm's Way OST	
2020	"My Motherland"	我的祖国	Stage play Battle of Triangle Hill theme song	
2020	"Take Aim"	瞄准	Drama Take Aim OST	
2020	"Back To Sulan Bridge Today"	今日重到苏澜桥	Mobile game Revelation Online song	
2021	"Centennial"	百年	Drama series Faith Makes Great OST	
2021	"Enter"	入局	The Lost Tomb 2: Explore with the Note Animation Concept OST	
2021	"The Shadow Behind"	背后的影子	Drama The Rebel (Chinese TV series) OST	
2021	"Come from Time"	从时光中走来	Drama Glory and Dreams OST	
2021	"Long Lost Love"	再别之时	Mobile game Light and Night song	With game character Jesse.
2021	"Aim High, Reach Far"	何处是远方	Stage musical On the Road OST	Written by Ayanga.
2021	"Break Formation"	破阵	Cartoon Great Journey of Teenagers OST	
2021	"About You"	有关你	Drama The Flaming Heart OST	
2021	"Konghou Order"	箜篌令	Cartoon Stellar Transformation 3 OST	
2021	"Dawn"	黎明	Drama People's Property OST	
2021	"Yu Jun Tong Chen"	与君同尘	Cartoon Demonic Path Ancestral Master Mo Dao Zu Shi OST	
2021	"Voyage"	远航	Drama Questions to Heaven OST	
2021	"A Big Dream"	大梦一场	Drama Gold Panning OST	
2021	"Firefly"	萤火	Cartoon Final Gate Anthem OST	
2022	"Regression"		Video game Honkai Impact 3rd OST	
2022	"Sea and Lighthouse"	海与灯塔	Drama Modern Marriage OST	With Zhang Yunhan.
2022	"The Guardian of the Stars"	星星的守护神	World Autism Day Charity Song	With various artists.
2022	"Reading Thousands of Miles"	阅行万里	The National Reading Conference Promotional Song	
2022	"As Time Goes By"	似水流年花落去	Drama The Imperial Age OST	
2022	"Youth"	芳华	Xinhua News	
2022	"String Song"	弦歌	Drama Love Like the Galaxy OST	
2022	"Commitment"	承诺	Documentary Forging Heroes to Revival OST	
2022	"In Search of Lost Time"	海的尽头是草原	Movie In Search of Lost Time OST	
2022	"I Put Your Name In My Heart"	我把你的名字念在心上	Activity by China Youth Daily	Composed by Ayanga.
2022	"Our Song"	我们的歌		With various artists such as Hu Ge.
2022	"We Are One"	我们都一样	2022 Asian Para Games Promotional Song	With Cao Fujia.

== Filmography ==
=== Film ===
Year	English title	Chinese title	Role	Notes
2014	Father	父亲		Short film
2017	Blood Maze	血迷宫之东宫西宫	Nan Zihao	
2018	Seventy-seven Kilometre	七十七公里		
2022	In Search of Lost Time	海的尽头是草原	Ider	

=== Television series ===
Year	English title	Chinese title	Role	Notes
2016	Weapon & Soul	器灵	Lin Chenyu	
2019	Arg Director 2	生活对我下手了2	Himself	Cameo
2020	The Story of My Parents' Youth	父亲的草原母亲的河	Nauhai	

=== Variety Shows and Documentary ===
Year	English title	Chinese title	Notes
2014	Mr. Super	超级先生	Champion
2014	Rising Star China	中国正在听	2nd runner-up
2017	Life in the Grassland	草原花美男	Episode 1, 2 and 3
2017	Let's Set Off Now	嘿！马上出发	20171104 Guest
2018	Super–Vocal	声入人心	One of the six Principals
2019	The Everlasting Classics Season 2	经典咏流传第二季	Episode 5
2019	Singer 2019	歌手2019	2nd runner-up
2019	Super Penguin League; Season:2	超级企鹅联盟Super3:星斗场	
2019	Singing with Legends	我们的歌	
2020	The Everlasting Classics Season 3	经典咏流传第三季	Episode 3
2020	The Firsts in Life	人生第一次	Episode 12
2020	Go Fighting! Season 6	极限挑战第六季	Episode 8
2020	Global Chinese Music	全球中文音乐榜上榜	20200815 Guest
2020	Perfect Summer	完美的夏天	
2020	Sisters Who Make Waves	乘风破浪的姐姐们	Finals Supporting Guest
2020	Crossover Singer 5	跨界歌王第五季	Finals Supporting Guest
2021	The Everlasting Classics Season 4	经典咏流传第四季	Episode 6
2021	What Would You Do	为歌而赞	Episode 3, 4 and 12
2021	Keep Running (TV series) Season 5	奔跑吧第五季	Episode 7 and 8
2021	Summer Refuge	屋檐之下	Episode 1 and 2
2021	The Most Beautiful Chinese Opera	最美中国戏	Episode 1
2022	China on Stage	舞台上的中国	Episode The Stories of China
2022	The City of Musicals	爱乐之都	
2022	The Treasured Voice Season III	天赐的声音第三季	Episode 2 and 3
2022	The Everlasting Classics Season 5	经典咏流传第五季	Episode 1
2022	The E-Pop of China	超感星电音	
2022	Poetry and Painting of China	诗画中国	20220924 Episode
2022	Masked Dancing King 3	蒙面舞王3	Episode 3
2022	Voice Monster	我是特优声剧团季	
2023	City of Musicals Season 2	爱乐之都·青春季	Judge, Regular Appearance
2023	Hello Life Season 4	你好生活 第四季	Episode 1, 7-8
2024	Together for Music	吾湖音乐局	Regular Appearance
2024	Melody Journey	音乐缘计划	Episode 5-6
2025	Hello Saturday 2025	你好，星期六 2025	20250531 Episode
2025	The Treasured Voice Season 6	天赐的声音 第六季	Episode 11
2025	Singer 2025	歌手2025	Episode 2
2025	Hit 2025	打歌2025	Episode 1
2025	Sound Trek 2025	声鸣远扬2025	Episode 1

== Concerts ==
- The Return of the Thunder God 雷神归来 (2015)
- Sing Your Heart Out 纵情歌唱 (2017)
- Peak Musical Concert 巅峰音乐会 (2018)

== Ambassadorship ==
Year	Campaign Organizer	Title	Notes/Ref.
2015	The Traditional Games of Ethnic Minorities	Image Ambassador	
2016	All-China Youth Federation	Member	
2020	Shanghai International Musical Festival	Image Ambassador	
2020	NFL China	Promotional Ambassador	
2021	Shanghai International Musical Festival	Image Ambassador	
2022	Bobbi Brown	China Ambassador	

== Awards ==
Year	Award	Category	Nominated work	Ref.
2013	3rd Inner Mongolia Young Singer TV Competition	First Prize (Trendy Music Category)	3Night of Ulaanbaatar	
2014	11th National Vocal Competition	Third Standard Prize (Trendy Music Category)	—N/a	
2017	Global Chinese Music Awards	Top Ranked Song	Mongol Artist	
2019	Fresh Asia Awards	Variety Music Artist of the Year	—N/a	
2019	Cosmo Glam Night	Person of The Year	—N/a	
2019	ifeng Fashion Choice	Music Trend of the Year	—N/a	
2020	27th ERC Chinese Top Ten Awards	Cross-over Singer of the Year	—N/a	
2021	28th ERC Chinese Top Ten Awards	Best Singer-Songwriter of the Year	—N/a	
2022	3rd Annual Light and Shadow China Annual Ceremony 第三届光影中国荣誉盛典	Media Attention New Actor Award	In Search of Lost Time	
