= Xu Zhong =

Chinese conductor and pianist

Xu Zhong (Chinese: 许忠; born 1968) is a Chinese conductor and pianist. He is currently the general director of Shanghai Opera House, the principal director of Fondazione Arena di Verona, the chief conductor of Suzhou Symphony Orchestra and dean of Soochow University School of Music, artistic director of Sound of Jiangnan Music Festival by Jiangsu Grand Theatre, artistic director of Fujian Song and Dance Theatre.
