= Super–Vocal =

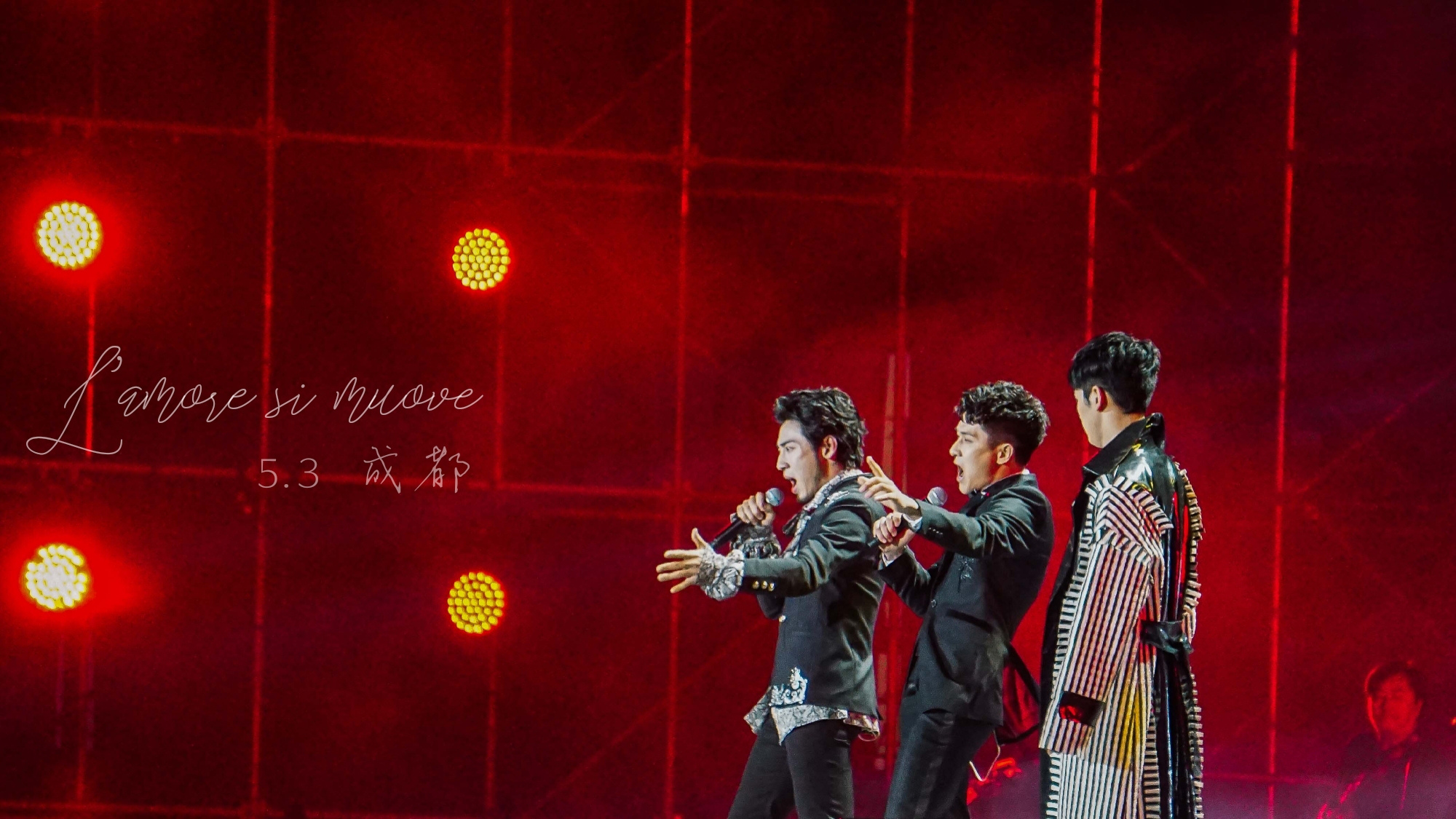
- Also known as: Chinese: 聲入人心; pinyin: Shēng rù rénxīn
- Directed by: Ren Yang
- Narrated by: Zhu Jun
- Country of origin: China
- Original language: Chinese
- No. of seasons: 2

Production
- Executive producer: Shen Xing
- Production location: Chang Sha
- Running time: 80-90 minutes

Original release
- Network: HBS: Hunan Television iQiyi
- Release: present

Super–Vocal (Chinese: 声入人心; pinyin: Shēng rù rénxīn) is a Chinese reality television created and produced by Hunan TV and iQIYI. It is a singing competition focused on classically trained singers, singing both operatic and musical pieces. It features 36 male singers, with six winners after a total of 100 days of training and filming. "Super-Vocal" Season 1 premiered on November 2, 2018, while Season 2 premiered on July 19, 2019.

== Format ==
Each season is filmed in a total of 100 days. During the competition, 36 male bel canto performers are challenged with different ensembles over each episode. In each episode, performers vie for the six spots as an "apprentice", but the rounds do not have elimination. The judges will train contestants during the competition based on the vocal range and their suitors on each Apprentice and Cover rounds. At the end of the 100 days, the judges will ultimately finalize a list of six performers who would be named as winners, in which they are awarded with touring and album release opportunities.

Singers were either assigned as Apprentice or Covers; an Apprentice will get to perform but Covers are assigned as backup singers.

== Summary ==
Season	Start broadcasting	end	Episodes	Producer	Principle Members
1	November 2, 2018	January 18, 2019	12	Liao Changyong; Shang Wenjie; Henry Lau; Shi Yijie (sub)	Ayanga; Cai Chengyu; Zheng Yunlong; Gao Tianhe; Wang Kai; Tong Zhuo
2	July 19, 2019	October 4, 2019	12	Liao Changyong; Zhang Huimei; Shang Wenjie; Wu Bixia (sub)	Xu Junshuo; Dai Chen; Zhang Yingxi; Guo Hongxu; He Liangchen; Zheng Qiyuan

== Musical works ==
=== Single ===
Release order	data	Track
1st	Heart of Light: Release Date: November 2, 2018; Record label: Sky Entertainment Media; Note: Only digital downloads are available	1. Heart of Light (The Theme Song of "Sound Into the Heart")
2nd	" Say Goodbye ": Release Date: January 20, 2019; Record label: Universal Dynamic Sound; Remarks: Not initiated by the program, only digital download is provided	1. do not say goodbye 2. Say goodbye (accompaniment).
3rd	" Guangming Island ": Release Date: July 19, 2019; Record label: Happy Sunshine; Note: Only digital downloads are available	1. Guangming Island (The Theme Song of "Sound Into the Heart" Season 2)

== Live shows ==
=== Concert / Tours ===
The "Super-Vocal" national tour was produced by the program team and Poly Performance. The first performance was kicked off at Beijing Poly Theater on April 16, 2019, and closed in Shanghai on June 2. This tour had a total of 17 shows, besides attending the Chengdu Music Festival and Poly ART Music Festival. The "Never Say Goodbye" non-profit tour was led by Yu Di and fellow cast members, without the involvement of "Super-Vocal" program. The same titled national tour of the second season of the concert kicked off on December 2, 2019 at the Changsha Grand Theater of the Meixi Lake International Cultural Center, and ended on January 14, 2020 in Beijing. There were 11 shows on this tour.

year	date	title	site	Participants
2019	04/16	[Super–Vocal] 2019 Concert Tour in Beijing	Beijing Poly Theater	A Yunga, Zheng Yunlong, Ju Hongchuan, Cai Chengyu, Gao Tianhe, Zhou Shen, Wang Kai, Tong Zhuo
2019	04/18	[Super–Vocal] 2019 concert tour in Tianjin	Tianjin Grand Theatre	Zhou Shen, Wang Xi, Wang Kai, Gao Tianhe, Zhang Chao, Zhai Li Shuotian, Cai Chengyu
2019	04/23	[Never Say Goodbye] Series Concert Shanghai	Shanghai SAIC Cultural Plaza	Zheng Yunlong, Yu Di, Li Qi, Zhou Shen, Jian Hongyi, Wang Kai, Liao Jialin, Liu Binzhen, Fang Shujian
2019	04/24	[Super–Vocal] 2019 Concert Tour Shenyang	Shengjing Grand Theater of Shenyang	Wang Xi, Wang Kai, Jia Fan, Ma Jia, Liao Jialin, Gao Yang, Zhai Li Shuotian
2019	04/26	[Super–Vocal] 2019 Concert Tour Qingdao	Qingdao Grand Theatre	Jia Fan, Gao Yang, Gao Tianhe, Ju Hongchuan, Wang Kai, Zhang Chao, Cai Chengyu
2019	04/30	[Super–Vocal] 2019 Concert Tour Zhuhai	Zhuhai Grand Theater	Lu Yupeng, A Yunga, Zhou Shen, Cai Chengyu, Tong Zhuo, Zhai Li Shuotian, Dai Wei
2019	05/03	Chengdu Music Festival Poly Art Festival	Chengdu Chengdu Open Air Music Park	Wang Qing, Gao Tianhe, Ju Hongchuan, Cai Chengyu, Ma Jia, Zhang Chao, Tong Zhuo, Zhai Li Shuotian, Jia Fan, Jian Hongyi, Gao Yang, Xing Yuan, Dai Wei, Shi Kai, Cai Yao, Gong Ziqi, Liang Pengjie, Li Qi
2019	05/05	[Super–Vocal] 2019 Concert Tour Changzhou	Changzhou Changzhou Grand Theater	Tong Zhuo, Ju Hongchuan, Gao Tianhe, Ma Jia, Zhang Chao, Gong Ziqi, Liang Pengjie
2019	05/07	[Super–Vocal] 2019 Concert Tour Hefei	Hefei Hefei Grand Theater	Wang Qing, Gao Tianhe, Ju Hongchuan, Cai Chengyu, Tong Zhuo, Jia Fan, Dai Wei
2019	05/09	[Super–Vocal] 2019 Concert Tour Wuhan	Wuhan Qintai Grand Theater	Ju Hongchuan, Ma Jia, Zhai Li Shuotian, Gao Yang, Zhang Chao, Shi Kai, Xing Yuan, Li Wenbao
2019	05/11	[Super–Vocal] 2019 Changsha	Changsha Meixi Lake International Cultural Center Grand Theatre	A Yunga, Zheng Yunlong, Ju Hongchuan, Cai Chengyu, Zhang Chao, Tong Zhuo, Ma Jia, Gao Tianhe
2019	05/12	[Super–Vocal] 2019 Changsha	Changsha Meixi Lake International Cultural Center Grand Theatre	A Yunga, Wang Xi, Zhou Shen, Cai Chengyu, Gao Yang, Dai Wei, Shi Kai, Gao Tianhe
2019	05/14	[Super–Vocal] 2019 Concert Tour Chongqing	Chongqing Chongqing Grand Theatre	Ju Hongchuan, Jia Fan, Gao Yang, Ma Jia, Zhang Chao, Gong Ziqi, Fang Shujian
2019	05/20	[Super–Vocal] 2019 concert Hangzhou	Hangzhou Yuhang Theater	A Yunga, Cai Chengyu, Jia Fan, Lu Yupeng, Lars Huang, Gong Ziqi, Dai Wei, Li Xiangzhe
2019	05/22	[Super–Vocal] 2019 Concert Tour Xiamen	Xiamen Jiageng Theater	Zhai Li Shuotian, Gao Tianhe, Hong Zhiguang, Ma Jia, Ju Hongchuan, Zhang Chao, Liang Pengjie, Liu Binyu
2019	05/26	[Super–Vocal] 2019 concert tour in Wuxi	Wuxi Grand Theater	Gao Tianhe, Cai Chengyu, Ju Hongchuan, Li Qi, Lars Huang, Zhang Chao, Hong Zhiguang, Zhai Li Shuotian
2019	05/28	[Super–Vocal] 2019 Concert Tour Nanjing	Nanjing Poly Theater, Nanjing	Tong Zhuo, Ma Jia, Li Qi, Jia Fan, Zhang Chao, Lars Huang, Fang Shujian, Liang Pengjie
2019	05/31	[Super–Vocal] 2019 Concert Tour Ningbo	Ningbo Ningbo Cultural Plaza Grand Theatre	Tong Zhuo, Liao Jialin, Jia Fan, Gao Yang, Lars Huang, Ma Jia, Zhai Li Shuotian, Dai Wei
2019	06/02	[Super–Vocal] 2019 Concert Tour Shanghai	Shanghai Poly Theater	A Yunga, Zheng Yunlong, Ju Hongchuan, Cai Chengyu, Gao Tianhe, Tong Zhuo, Zhang Chao, Jia Fan, Ma Jia
2019	06/08	[The Blue in Your Eyes] Bel Canto Tour 2019 Beijing	Beijing Erqi Theater	Gao Yang, Jia Fan, Ma Jia, Wang Xi
2019	06/09	[The Blue in Your Eyes] Bel Canto Boys Tour 2019 at Shijiazhuang	Shijiazhuang Shijiazhuang Grand Theater	Gao Yang, Jia Fan, Ma Jia, Wang Xi
2019	06/14	[The Blue in Your Eyes] Bel Canto Tour 2019 Chengdu	Chengdu Xanadu Grand Theater	Gao Yang, Jia Fan, Ma Jia, Wang Xi
2019	06/16	[The Blue in Your Eyes] Bel Canto Tour 2019 Xi'an	Xi'an Buick Shaanxi Grand Theater	Gao Yang, Jia Fan, Ma Jia, Wang Xi
2019	06/21	[Never Say Goodbye] Series Concert Beijing	Beijing Workers Stadium	Yu Di, Zheng Yunlong, Wang Kai, Liao Jialin, Li Qi, Zhai Li Shuotian, Gong Ziqi, Fang Shujian, Li Xiangzhe, Liu Binzhen, Jin Shengquan
2019	06/21	[The Blue in Your Eyes] Bel Canto 2019 Tour Concert Shenzhen	Grand Theater of Shenzhen Nanshan Cultural and Sports Center Theatre	Gao Yang, Jia Fan, Ma Jia, Wang Xi, Lars Huang
2019	07/21	[The Blue in Your Eyes] The Youth Singing and Touring Beijing	Beijing Candy Tango Third Floor Concert Hall	Chen Bohao, Gong Ziqi, Lars Huang, Liang Pengjie
2019	07/23	[The Blue in Your Eyes] Youth Singing Tour Wuhan	Wuhan Hubei Theater	Chen Bohao, Gong Ziqi, Liang Pengjie, Xing Yuan
2019	07/28	[The Blue in Your Eyes] The Youth Singing and Touring Kunming	Kunming Hailiao Hall	Chen Bohao, Gong Ziqi, Liang Pengjie, Xing Yuan
2019	08/02	[The Blue in Your Eyes] The Youth Singing and Traveling in Chongqing	Chongqing Chongqing Culture Palace Grand Theatre	Chen Bohao, Gong Ziqi, Lars Huang, Xing Yuan
2019	08/03	[The Blue in Your Eyes] Youth Singing Tour Chengdu	Chengdu Zhenghuo Art Center Hall 1	Chen Bohao, Gong Ziqi, Lars Huang
2019	08/10	[The Blue in Your Eyes] The Voice of Fantasy Fantasy Nanjing	Nanjing Jiangsu Broadcasting and Television Litchi Theatre	Chen Bohao, Lars Huang, Liang Pengjie, Jin Shengquan, Liao Jialin
2019	08/11	[The Blue in Your Eyes] The Voice of Fantasy Fantasy Hangzhou	Hangzhou Zhehua Art Theater	Chen Bohao, Lars Huang, Liang Pengjie, Jin Shengquan
2019	08/13	[The Blue in Your Eyes] The Voice of Fantasy Shanghai	Shanghai Maggie Theater	Chen Bohao, Gao Yang, Lars Huang, Liang Pengjie, Jin Shengquan
2019	08/14	[The Blue in Your Eyes] The Voice of Fantasy Shanghai	Shanghai Maggie Theater	Gao Yang, Lars Huang, Xing Yuan, Jin Shengquan, Liao Jialin
2019	08/16	[The Blue in Your Eyes] The Voice of Fantasy Fantasy Xi'an	Xi'an Fruit Core Theater	Chen Bohao, Liang Pengjie, Xingyuan
2019	08/18	[The Blue in Your Eyes] The Voice of Fantasy Fantasy Beijing	Rulun Lecture Hall, Renmin University of China, Beijing	Lars Huang, Xing Yuan, Jin Shengquan, Liao Jialin
2019	08/20	[The Blue in Your Eyes] Youth Singing Tour Tianjin	Tianjin Jinwan Theater	Gao Yang, Gong Ziqi, Xing Yuan, Jin Shengquan, Liao Jialin
2019	08/24	[Blue in Your Eyes] The Youth Singing and Touring Guangzhou Station	Guangzhou Guangzhou Children's Palace Beilei Theatre	Chen Bohao, Lars Huang, Liang Pengjie, Xingyuan, Jin Shengquan
2019	08/25	[The Blue in Your Eyes] The Youth Singing Tour Shenzhen	Grand Theater of Shenzhen Nanshan Cultural and Sports Center Theatre	Chen Bohao, Gao Yang, Lars Huang, Liang Pengjie, Xing Yuan, Jin Shengquan
2019	11/08	Poly Art Festival Xi'an Concert	Xi'an Qujiang International Convention and Exhibition Center	A Yunga, Zheng Yunlong, Wang Xi, Gao Tianhe, Li Qi, Jia Fan, Ma Jia, Zhai Li Shuotian
2019	11/17	Poly ART Music Festival Zhuji Station	Shaoxing Zhuji Xishi Grand Theater	Jia Fan, Ma Jia, Hong Zhiguang, Zhai Li Shuotian, Hu Chaozheng
2019	12/02	[Super–Vocal II] Concert National Tour Changsha	Changsha Meixi Lake International Cultural Center Grand Theatre	Zhang Yingxi, Zheng Qiyuan, Xu Junshuo, He Liangchen, He Yilin, Guo Hongxu, Dong Pan, Fang Xiaodong, Zhao Yi, Tong Zhuo, Cai Chengyu
2019	12/03	[Super–Vocal II] Concert National Tour Changsha	Changsha Meixi Lake International Cultural Center Grand Theatre	Zhang Yingxi, Zheng Qiyuan, Xu Junshuo, He Liangchen, Hu Hao, He Yilin, Guo Hongxu, Dong Pan, Fang Xiaodong, Zhao Yi, Jia Fan
2019	12/10	[Super–Vocal II] Concert National Tour Chongqing	Chongqing Chongqing Grand Theatre	Zhang Yingxi, He Liangchen, He Yilin, Yuan Guangquan, Yin Haolun, Fang Xiaodong, Zhao Yi, Hu Hao
2019	12/13	[Super–Vocal II] Concert National Tour Hangzhou	Hangzhou Yuhang Theater	Liu Yan, Xu Junshuo, Dai Yan, Yin Haolun, Fang Xiaodong, Dong Pan, Liu Quanjun, Jia Fan
2019	12/17	[Super–Vocal II] Concert National Tour Hefei	Hefei Hefei Grand Theater	He Liangchen, Yuan Guangquan, Zhao Yue, He Yilin, Tashi Dunzhu, Hu Hao, Zhao Fanjia, Hong Zhiguang
2019	12/20	[Super–Vocal II] National Tour of Wuxi	Wuxi Grand Theater	Zhang Yingxi, Xu Junshuo, Guo Hongxu, He Liangchen, Yuan Guangquan, He Yilin, Fang Xiaodong, Zhou Shiyuan, Liu Quanjun
2019	12/24	[Super–Vocal II] National Concert of Zhengzhou	Zhengzhou Henan Art Center Grand Theater	Liu Yan, Zhao Yue, Guo Hongxu, Yuan Guangquan, Dong Pan, Zhou Shiyuan, Wang Minhui, Zhao Yi, Mao Er, Yang Haochen, Xu Kai
2019	12/27	[I love you · China] Liao Changyong and his Meixi Lake boys concert	Zhuhai Grand Theater	Liao Changyong, Jia Fan, Zhao Yue, Dai Yan, Cui Yuefeng, Song Yuhang, Yin Haolun, Zhao Yi Guest: Ren Wenwen
2020	01/04	[Super–Vocal II] Concert National Tour Nanjing	Nanjing Poly Theater, Nanjing	Liu Yan, Zheng Qiyuan, Xu Junsuo, Guo Hongxu, Dai Yan, Dong Pan, Zhao Chaofan, Hu Chaozheng, Wang Shang
2020	01/11	[Super–Vocal II] Concert National Tour Qingdao	Qingdao Grand Theatre	Zheng Qiyuan, Zhao Yue, Guo Hongxu, He Liangchen, He Yilin, Yuan Guangquan, Dong Pan, Zhou Shiyuan, Huang Mingyu
2020	01/13	[Super–Vocal II] Concert National Tour Beijing	Beijing Poly Theater	Zhang Yingxi, Zheng Qiyuan, Xu Junshuo, He Liangchen, Dai Yan, Guo Hongxu, Zhao Yue, Yuan Guangquan, He Yilin, Zhao Yi, Zheng Yibin, Zhou Qi, Zhao Fanjia, Yin Haolun, Liu Quanjun, Hu Hao
2020	01/14	[Super–Vocal II] Concert National Tour Beijing	Beijing Poly Theater	Zhang Yingxi, Zheng Qiyuan, Xu Junshuo, He Liangchen, Dai Yan, Guo Hongxu, Zhao Yue, Yuan Guangquan, He Yilin, Zhao Yi, Hong Zhiguang, Jia Fan, Dong Pan, Yin Haolun, Liu Quanjun, Hu Hao

== Result Competing in "Singer 2019" ==
On January 26, 2019, the "Singer 2019" program announced on Weibo that the "Super-Vocal Boys" consisting of A Yunga, Zheng Yunlong, Ju Hongchuan and Cai Chengyu would become the second group to be a challenger on the show. The group competed with singer Qian Zhenghao in the second round in hope for competing in the kick-off round. He defeated Qian Zhenghao with "Deer Be Free", which had previously sung by A Yunga and Cai Chengyu in the fourth season, and was officially qualified for the knock-off round. In the next official kick-off round, they sang Loren Allred 's "Never Enough" and won the third place. On March 12, Zheng Yunlong issued a statement on his personal Weibo saying that he would no longer participate in the fourth round of knockouts and subsequent competitions due to conflicting schedules. The "Super-Vocal Boys" continued to participate in the remaining season with three members. In the end, the group successfully advanced to the finals and won the third place.

Period	Number of rounds	Premiere date	Singing a song	original singer	Song introduction	Ranking	Votes
6	Second round kickoff	February 15, 2019	Never Enough	Loren Allred	Lyricists / Composers: Benj Pasek, Justin Paul ( Pasek and Paul ) Arrangement: Zhong Xingmin	3	18.305%
7	Third qualifying round	February 22, 2019	"heart"	Liu Yan, Lin Jing	Lyricist: Guan Shan Composer: Three Treasures Arrangement: Nick Pyo	2	17.395%
8	Third round elimination	March 1, 2019	"I Want To Say I Love You Loudly"	Zhang Jie and Gunshan	Lyricist: Gan Shijia Composer: Dodona Good Man Arrangement: Nick Pyo	6	12.195%
9	Third round kickoff	March 8, 2019	"True Love Movement"	Andrea Bocelli	Lyricists: Tang Tian, Ju Hongchuan Composers: Pierpaolo Guerrini, Paolo Luciani Arrangement: Nick Pyo	3	16.930%
10	Fourth qualifying round	March 15, 2019	"she was"	Wang Siyuan	Lyricist / Composer: Wang Siyuan Arrangement: Nick Pyo	5	13.810%
11	Fourth round kickoff	March 22, 2019	The Big Ship	Ju Hongchuan	Lyricist / Composer: Sun Haini Arrangement: Nick Pyo	6	9.015%
12	Breakout	March 29, 2019	"Someday"	Sha Baoliang	Lyricist: Guan Shan Composer: Sambo Arrangement: Nick Pyo	1	23.23%
13	King of Golden Songs Sprint Night	April 5, 2019	"Forever Queen" Suite (Guest Guest: Dimashi )		Arrangement: Nick Pyo	—	
13	King of Golden Songs Sprint Night	April 5, 2019	Love of My Life	Queen	Lyricist / Composer: Freddie Mercury	—	
13	King of Golden Songs Sprint Night	April 5, 2019	We Will Rock You	Queen	Lyricist / Composer: Brian May	—	
13	King of Golden Songs Sprint Night	April 5, 2019	Bohemian Rhapsody	Queen	Lyricist / Composer: Freddie Mercury	—	
13	King of Golden Songs Sprint Night	April 5, 2019	We Are the Champions	Queen	Lyricist / Composer: Freddie Mercury	—	
14	Finals first round	April 12, 2019	You Raise Me Up (Singing guest: Wang Leehom )	Secret Garden	Lyricist: Brendan Graham ) Composer: Rolf Løvland Arrangement: Nick Pyo	—	
14	Finals second round	April 12, 2019	"In this moment"	Liu Lingfei	Lyricist: Zhou Xiao Wei Composer: Frank Wildhorn Arrangement: Nick Pyo	3	7.88%

== "Choir! 300" Competition Results ==
On August 11, 2019, the "Super-Vocal Choir" by Ju Hongchuan, Cai Chengyu and Zhang Chao participated in the filming of "Choir! 300" season three, broadcast on Tencent Video. During the un-rehearsal section, they sang "Heart of Light" with the fans. The Super–Vocal Choir lost to the Rocket Girl 101 Choir by 0.96 points, unfortunately eliminated before the final round. In the sixth episode which was aired on September 1, the Super–Vocal Choir gave back to the fans with a song "Never Say Goodbye".

== Ratings ==
=== First season ===
China Mainland Hunan Satellite TV premiere ratings
Episode	Air date	CSM52 / 55			CSM National Network		
Episode	Air date	Ratings	Viewership	Ranking	Ratings	Viewership	Ranking
1	November 2, 2018	0.451	1.83	4	0.45	1.93	2
2	November 9, 2018	0.403	1.52	6	0.49	1.85	1
3	November 16, 2018	0.336	1.27	6	0.32	1.31	2
4	November 23, 2018	0.281	1.07	11	0.25	0.99	4
5	November 30, 2018	0.391	1.46	7	0.35	1.39	3
6	December 7, 2018	0.327	1.19	8	0.29	1.1	4
7	December 14, 2018	0.397	1.56	6	0.32	1.34	3
8	December 21, 2018	0.433	1.68	6	0.33	1.36	3
9	December 29, 2018	0.484	1.77	9	0.44	1.65	2
10	January 4, 2019	0.417	1.57	5	0.39	1.51	3
11	January 11, 2019	0.535	1.93	4	0.46	1.75	2
12	January 18, 2019	0.763	2.81	2	0.64	2.43	1

=== Second season ===
China Mainland Hunan Satellite TV premiere ratings
Episode	Air date	CSM59			CSM National Network		
Episode	Air date	Ratings	Viewership	Ranking	Ratings	Viewership	Ranking
1	July 19, 2019	0.658	2.55	6	0.46	1.92	2
2	July 26, 2019	0.614	2.41	5	0.5	2.2	2
3	August 2, 2019	0.542	2.18	6	0.45	1.95	2
4	August 9, 2019	0.505	2.04	6	0.44	1.97	2
5	August 16, 2019	0.500	2.07	9	0.4	1.78	2
6	August 23, 2019	0.485	2.01	9	0.31	1.42	3
7	August 30, 2019	0.406	1.75	8	0.42	1.99	2
8	September 6, 2019	0.455	1.83	8	0.39	1.72	2
9	September 13, 2019	0.363	1.34	14	0.28	1.16	2
10	September 20, 2019	0.370	1.52	9	0.29	1.33	3
11	September 27, 2019	0.460	2.00	8	0.37	1.87	2
12	October 4, 2019	0.557	2.44	5	0.36	1.81	3

== Awards ==
Year	Awards ceremony	Awards	Shortlisted	Result
2019	25th Shanghai Television Festival Magnolia Award	Best TV Variety Show Award	"Super-Vocal" Season 1	Won
