= Zheng Yunlong =

Chinese musical theatre actor and singer (born 1990)

- 郑云龙
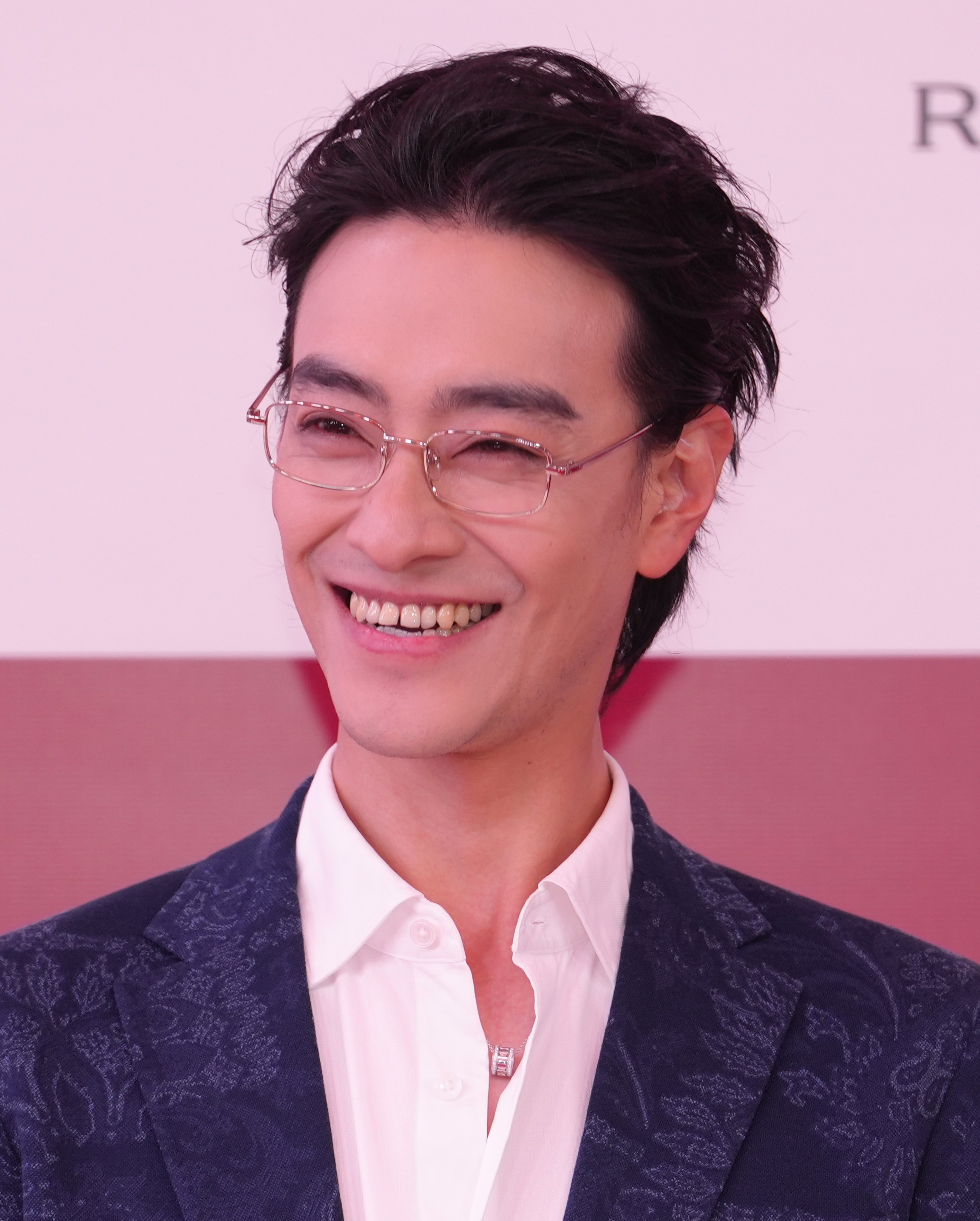
- Zheng at 2026 Shanghai International Film Festival
- Born: 27 June 1990 (age 36); Qingdao, Shandong, China
- Education: Beijing Dance Academy
- Occupations: Actor, Singer
- Years active: 2013–present
- Height: 1.87 m (6 ft 2 in)

Chinese name
- Simplified Chinese: 郑云龙
- Traditional Chinese: 鄭雲龍
- Literal meaning: "Zheng Cloud-Dragon"
Transcriptions
Standard Mandarin
- Hanyu Pinyin: Zhèng Yún Lóng

Zheng Yunlong (Chinese: 郑云龙; born 27 June 1990) is a Chinese stage and screen actor and singer from Qingdao, China. He has appeared in numerous Chinese musicals and stage plays.

== Early life and education ==
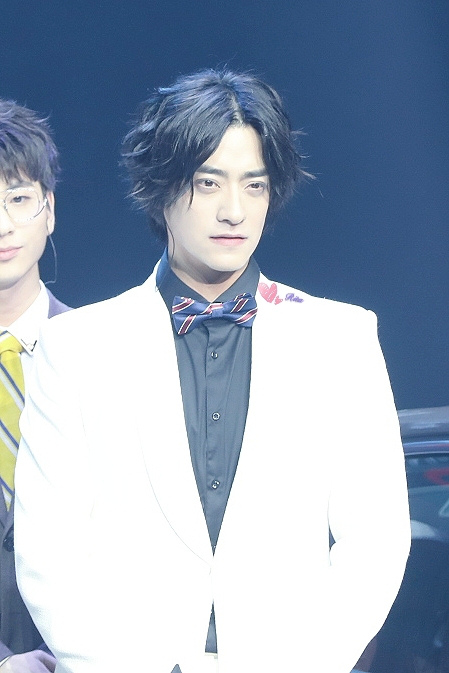
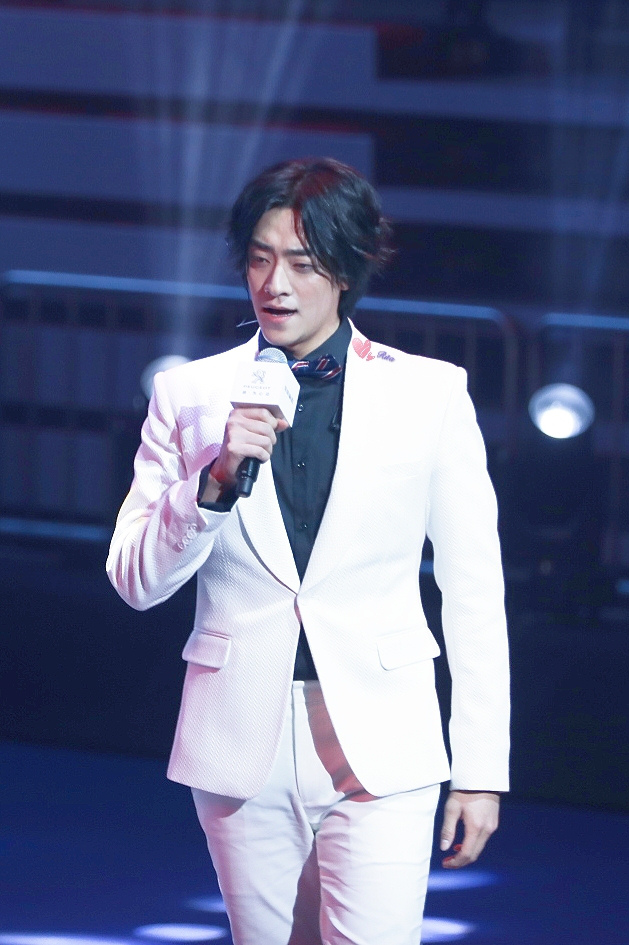
Zheng performing during a car launch event of Dongfeng Peugeot-Citroën, March 2019

Zheng Yunlong was born on 27 June 1990 in Qingdao, Shandong and graduated from the Musical Theatre Department of Beijing Dance Academy in 2013.

== Career ==
Zheng made his professional musical theater debut in 2013 as Kessar in Nasreddin.

His notable musical roles include the Chinese adaptations of Jekyll/Hyde in Jekyll & Hyde, Quixote/Cervantes in Man of La Mancha, Stacee in Rock of Ages, and Michael in Murder Ballad.

In August 2018, he won the Chinese Musical Academy Award for Best Male Actor. In November the same year, he participated in the singing competition reality show Super-Vocal and became well-known as one of the six final winners. He also appeared in the singing contest show Singer 2019 as a member of the Super-Vocal finalist group.

In March 2019, Zheng was selected by Disney to sing the Mandarin version of the theme song "Baby Mine" for the fantasy adventure film Dumbo. In August, Zheng acted in a stage play, The Poetic Age, for the first time, and was awarded the Best New Talent in Lead Roles of the 30th Shanghai Magnolia Stage Awards. And since 2019, he has performed various leading roles in stage plays, including Emperor Guangxu in Deling and Cixi (2019 co-production of Tianjin People's Art Theatre and Hong Kong Repertory Theatre), Eben Cabot in Desire Under the Elms (2021 production of Beijing People's Art Theatre), and Frankenstein/Creature in Frankenstein (Chinese adaptation of 2011 British National Theatre production).

Zheng made his screen debut in 2020, playing the painter Gong Yushan in The Chanting Willows. The movie entered Main Competition Sector of the 24th Shanghai International Film Festival Golden Goblet Award. For his portrayal, Zheng won the Best New Actor in the 2021 17th Chinese American Film Festival Golden Angel Awards.

Starting in September 2022, he was cast in the Shanghai Grand Theater's Chinese production of the critically acclaimed stage play Frankenstein.

== Voice and artistry ==
A natural baritone, Zheng trained himself to sing tenor so that he would have a better chance of being cast as the lead in musicals. His voice spans two and a half octaves and is noted for its expressiveness and narrative quality.

== Philanthropy ==
Zheng was named charity ambassador of the AIA Angel Heart Charity Foundation in 2019.

== Theatre ==
=== Musicals ===
Year	Title	Chinese title	Role	Notes
2012	Go Lala Go	杜拉拉升职记	Wang Wei	
2013	Nasreddin	纳斯尔丁·阿凡提	Kessar	
2014	Love U, Teresa	爱上邓丽君	Zhou Mengjun	
2015	The Peach Blossoms	又见桃花红	Ye Mian	
2015–2016	Ah! Kuliang	啊！鼓岭	Eugene Gardner	
2017	Jekyll & Hyde	变身怪医	Henry Jekyll / Edward Hyde	
2017–2019	Murder Ballad	谋杀歌谣	Michael	
2018–2019	Rock of Ages	摇滚年代	Stacee Jaxx	
2018	Love! Human	恋爱吧！人类	Li Haomin	
2018	Man of La Mancha	我，堂吉诃德	Don Quixote / Miguel de Cervantes	
2018–2019	Letter	信	Takeshima Takeshi	
2020-2021	The Fiction	小说	White Hismann	
2021-2022	Agatha the Musical	阿加莎	Roy	
2023-2025	Invitation to Wine	将进酒	Li Bai	Also artistic director

=== Stage Plays ===
Year	Title	Chinese title	Role	Notes
2019	The Poetic Age	漫长的告白	Chen Zhongxing	
2019-2021	Deling and Cixi	德龄与慈禧	Emperor Guangxu	
2021-2024	Desire Under the Elms	榆树下的欲望	Eben Cabot	Produced by Beijing People's Art Theatre
2022	Frankenstein	弗兰肯斯坦	Victor Frankenstein / The Creature	
2024-2026	The Magic Hour	魔幻时刻	Murata Taiki	Also producer
2025	Hamlet	哈姆雷特	Hamlet	Produced by Beijing People's Art Theatre

== Filmography ==
=== Film ===
Year	English title	Chinese title	Role	Notes
2021	The Chanting Willows	柳浪闻莺	Gong Yushan	
2021	Flaming Cloud	三贵情史	Feng Ge	
2024	To Gather Around	胜券在握	Zhou Wanggao	
2026	A Table for Two	拼桌	Ye Fan	Filmed in 2023

=== Television ===
Year	English title	Chinese title	Role	Notes	Ref.
2020	My Catmate	你好喵室友	Himself		
2020	Unbending Will	石头开花	A Niu		
2021	Vacation of Love	假日暖洋洋	Gao Junyu		
2023	Fantastic Doctors	非凡医者	He Tong		
2023	The Future Handbook	明日生存指南	Shang Ran		
2023	Hi Producer	正好遇见你	An Yan		
2024	Under the Skin 2	猎罪图鉴2	Fang Kaiyi		
2026	The Trembling of Cicada	蝉	Zhao Yijie		
TBA	Us in Wonderland	明日乐园	Gu Qian	Post-Production	
TBA	The Unseen Qin Empire	秦谜	Han Fei	Post-Production	

=== Variety and Reality Shows ===
Year	English title	Chinese title	Notes	Ref.
2018	Super–Vocal	声入人心	Contestant	
2019	Super Penguin League; Season:2	超级企鹅联盟Super3:星斗场	Basketball Player	
2020	Our Song 2	我们的歌2	Contestant	
2022	Sing! China: Yue Opera Special Season	中国好声音越剧特别季	Coach	

== Accolades ==
Year	Association	Category	Nominated work	Result	Ref.
2018	Chinese Musical Academy Awards	Best Actor	Jekyll & Hyde	Won	
2020	Magnolia Stage Awards	Best Newcomer in a Leading Role	The Poetic Age	Won	
2021	Chinese American Film Festival Golden Angel Awards	Best New Actor	The Chanting Willows	Won	
2022	Chinese Theatre Awards	Best Actor	Frankenstein	Nominated	
2024	Chinese Theatre Awards	Best Actor	The Magic Hour	Nominated	
2024	Chinese Theatre Awards	Best Investor	The Magic Hour	Won	

== Discography ==
Year	English title	Chinese title	Album	Notes
2015	"Returning Upon the Clouds"	乘云归		Yunmeng Sect theme song for the Legend of Chu Liuxiang mobile game
2016	"In Defiance of the Mortal Realm"	逆尘	Startled in Prison OST	
2017	"Take Me as I Am"	只有你最懂	Jekyll & Hyde Original Chinese Cast Recording	
2018	"The Luckiest Thing"	最幸运的事	Love! Human Original Cast Recording	
2018	"The Greatest Distance"	最远的距离	Love! Human Original Cast Recording	
2018	"Heart of Light"	光之心		Super Vocal theme song
2019	"Never Say Goodbye"	不说再见		With Liao Changyong and the other 35 participants of Super Vocal
2019	"Baby Mine"	亲爱的	Dumbo OST	
2019	"A New Day"	新的一天		Shennan Avenue promotional song
2019	"Calabash Brothers"	葫蘆娃	Art in Action: A New Cover Collection of Nursery Rhymes	With Frank Ju, Cai Chengyu, and Ayanga
2019	"For the Glory"	全职高手之巅峰荣耀	The King's Avatar: For the Glory OST	Theme song with Ayanga
2019	"Water From Heaven"	水从天上来	Love and Destiny OST	Insert song with Zhang Bichen
2019	"We Are All Nocturnal Wanders"	都是夜歸人	Midnight Diner OST	Ending theme with Ayanga
2019	"Why Not Youth"	何妨年少	Chūka Ichiban! OST	Chinese version of the opening theme
2019	"Your Smile"	你的微笑		AIA Angel Heart Charity Foundation promotional song
2019	"The Birds Fly At Dusk"	黄昏时 众鸟飞逝		With Yu Di
2020	"They Said"	他们说	The Great Ruler OST	Ending theme
2020	"Heart Warms Heart Equals the World"	心暖心等于世界		Charity single with 70+ other celebrity volunteers
2020	"Youth March"	少年行	The Everlasting Classics	With Ayanga, Frank Ju, and Gao Tianhe
2020	"Gleam"	微光		Charity single with Cai Chengyu
2020	"A Fleeting Blossom with Timely Rain"	昙花一现雨及时	Love of Thousand Years OST	Ending theme with Zhou Shen
2020	"Seeking Light"	寻光	Serenade of Peaceful Joy OST	Ending theme
2020	"Atonement"	偿还		Charity single for AIA Angel Heart Charity Foundation
2020	"Never Gone, Never Forgotten"	莫失莫忘	The Song of Glory OST	Character image song
2020	"Bad Mood"	我心情不太好	My Strange Friend OST	Ending theme
2020	"Dream Traveller"	拾梦旅人	My Catmate OST	Theme song
2020	"The Nation at Peace"	山河无恙		Tribute single in commemoration the 70th anniversary of the Chinese People's Volunteer Army's deployment in the Korean War
2020	"On This Day"	这一天	Unbending Will OST	Ending theme
2021	"Big Ship"	大船	Vacation of Love OST	Insert song
2021	"Sink"	沉	Vacation of Love OST	Insert song
2021	"To Gaze Afar"	遥望	The Rebel Princess OST	Insert song
2021	"Prelude to Water"	水调歌头	My Heroic Husband OST	Ending theme
2021	“The Light of Dawn"	曙色		Deling and Cixi theme song
2021	"Reborn"	重生	The Dance of the Storm OST	Insert song
2021	"Lord of Mysteries"	诡秘之主		Commemoration song in celebration of the first anniversary of the novel's completion
2021	"Farewell"	送别	Universe of Youth	Commemoration song in celebration of the centenary of the Chinese Communist Party
2021	"Youth Traveling the World"	天地少年行		Longhua promotional song
2021	"We Are Not Afraid"	我们不怕	Chinese Doctors OST	Theme song
2021	"Spark"	星火	Spark	Commemoration song in celebration of the centenary of the Chinese Communist Party with Henry Huo and Li Qi
2021	"Reconstruction"	重塑	Faith Makes Great OST	Insert song
2021	"Guard"	守护	Crime Crackdown OST	Theme song
2021	"Endless Sound"	无尽声	Heaven Official's Blessing Donghua Season 1 OST	San Lang image song
2021	"Resolve"	定心	One and Only OST	Insert song
2021	"Walking on Grass"	踏莎行	Walking on Grass	With Dai Quan
2021	"The Dragon Lies in Wait“	潜龙勿用	The Forbidden City OST	Theme song
2021	"Keep Silent"	不语不言	The Lion's Secret OST	Promotional song
2022	"See You Again"	再相见	The Chanting Willows OST	Theme song
2022	"Face the Sun"	向阳	Letters to Tomorrow	With Curley G, Yi Zhang Gui, and Wang Yige
2022	"The Child Living Inside My Heart"	心里的小孩	The Child Living Inside My Heart	
2022	"The Best Times"	最好的时光		AIA Group promotional song
2022	"The Loftiest Dream"	最高的梦	The Loftiest Dream	With Ci Ren La Mu, Wang Li, Zha Xi Ping Cuo, and Li Qi
2022	“Plucking Stars"	摘星辰		Honor of Kings musical Plucking Stars promotional song
2022	"Gears"	齿轮	My Deepest Dream OST	Opening theme
2022	"The Ocean"	海洋		"One Earth, One Love" Public Welfare Initiative charity song
2023	"Those Who Return"	归人	Royal Rumours OST	Opening theme
2023	"When Light Meets Shadow"	光影之见	Thin Ice OST	Opening theme
2023	"Stars of China"	星耀中华	Youth in the Flames of War OST	Ending theme with the Shijia Primary School Golden Sail Choir
2023	"Solitary Flame"	孤火		GKART theme song with Liao Jialin
2023	"Dark River"	暗河	Tales of Dark River Donghua OST	Opening theme
2023	"Longevity"	长生		Longevity Sword Sect theme song for the Moonlight Blade mobile game
2025	"Ballad of the Grand Canal"	运河谣		Theme song for Shine! Grand Canal
2025	"Regardless of Time"	不问朝夕	The Prisoner of Beauty OST	Insert song

== Concert tours ==
=== What's Up With Zheng Yunlong? Tour ===
Date	City	Venue
2021-5-9	Beijing	Club Tango (糖果音乐厅)
2021-5-23	Shanghai	Modern Sky Lab
2021-6-5	Hangzhou	9 Club (酒球会@目里空间)

=== What's Up With Zheng Yunlong? Pro Tour ===
Date	City	Venue
2023-5-13	Guangzhou	Guangzhou Gymnasium (广州体育馆)
2023-6-3	Shanghai	Mercedes-Benz Arena (梅赛德斯-奔驰文化中心)
