= Zhou Shen discography =

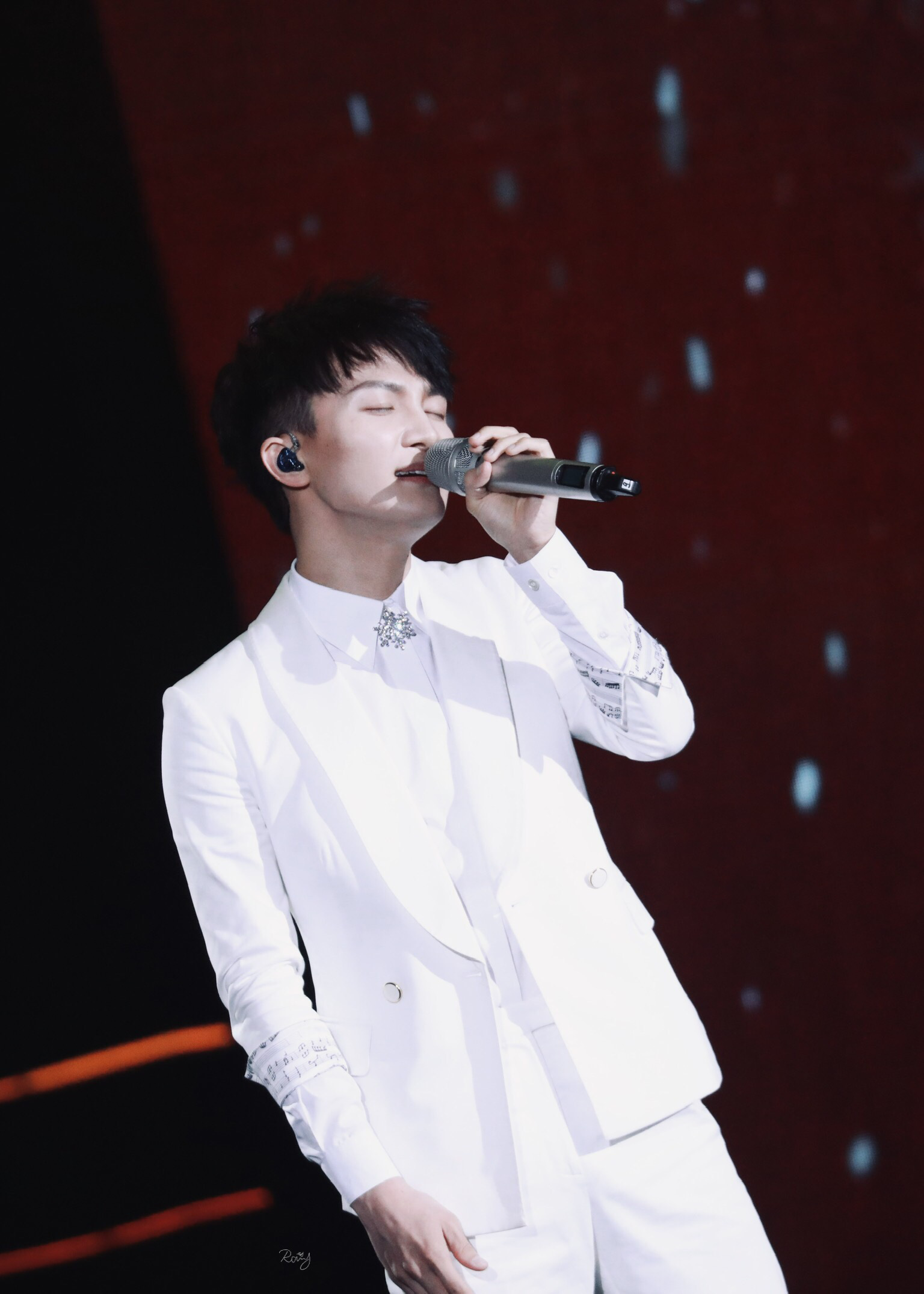
- Zhou in 2019
- Studio albums: 2
- EPs: 1
- Live albums: 2
- Singles: 248+

This is the discography of Chinese recording artist Zhou Shen (Chinese: 周深). Zhou's representative song, "Big Fish", won eight awards for him. According to charts statistics of Netease Cloud Music as of July 1, 2020, Zhou Shen was praised as "one of the most successful renowned Chinese artists in recent years" by Netease Cloud Music.

== Studio albums ==
List of studio albums, showing selected details, sales figures, and certifications
Title	Album details	Peak chart positions	Sales
Title	Album details	CHN	Sales
Charlie's Debut Album (深的深)	Released: November 6, 2017; Label: Taihe Music, Ocean Butterflies; Formats: CD, digital download; Track listing: 1. 玫瑰与小鹿 (The Rose and the Deer); 2. 浅浅 (Shallow); 3. 哥哥 (Brother); 4. 迎刃 (Towards the Blade); 5. 蓝色降落伞 (Blue Parachute); 6. 风景 (Scenery); 7. 妳 (You); 8. 白墙 (White Wall); 9. 大鱼 (Big Fish); 10. 一缕执念 (A Wisp of Fascination)	—	
Shenself (反深代词)	Released: September 29, 2024; Label: Zhou Shen Studio; Formats: CD, digital download; Track listing: 1. 深 Intro; 2. 蜃楼 (Mirage); 3. 重启 (Restart); 4. 记忆商店 (The Memory Store); 5. 警报 (The Giver); 6. 少管我 (Shao Guan Wo / Watch Ur Manners); 7. 嗨 (Say Hi); 8. 缝合 (Fix You); 9. Wala li longla 10. 空壳 (Shen); 11. 没关系 (Life is Like a Box of Chocolates); 12. 请我不改 (Brave Heart); 13. 虚构 (The Mask); 14. 周 Outro	1	CHN: 1,200,000 (dl.)

== Extended plays ==
Title	Album details
The Doomsday Spacecraft (末日飞船) (with Tang Hanxiao)	Released: July 18, 2019; Label: Fei Guo Music Culture Group; Formats: CD, digital download; Track listing: 1. 末日飞船（合唱）(The Doomsday Spacecraft); 2. 卡西尼（合唱）(Cassini)
Shen's Love (小深情)	Released: September 8, 2025; Label: Shanghai Jinyan Culture Media Co., Ltd.; Formats: Digital download; Track listing: 1. 嗨！人间; 2. 我想你了; 3. 来啊; 4. 遗失的日子; 5. 漫漫; 6. 空荡荡

== Cover albums ==
Title	Album details
Aftertaste (回味) (with Li Wei)	Released: July 1, 2015; Label: Bravo Entertainment Inc.; Formats: Digital download, streaming; Track listing: 1. 请跟我来 (Follow Me); 2. 偶然 (Fortuitously); 3. 花样年华 (Best Years in Lifetime); 4. 叶子 (Leaf (Zhou Shen only)); 5. 朋友 (Friends); 6. 往事只能回味 (Past Can Only Be Reminisced); 7. 用心良苦 (For all My Pains (Li Wei only)); 8. 爱我别走 (Never Let Go if You Love Me (Li Wei only)); 9. 烦 (Annoyance (Zhou Shen only))

== Live albums ==
Title	Album details
Shen & Isabelle Shanghai Live Concert (with Isabelle Huang)	Released: May 18, 2019; Label: Z Global Music; Formats: Digital download, streaming; Track listing: 1. 大调 (Major (Isabelle Huang only)); 2. 缘起 (Genesis (Zhou Shen only)); 3. 醉 (Intoxication (Isabelle Huang only)); 4. 惊鸿一面 （合唱）(An Entranced Glance); 5. 我要你 (I Want You (Isabelle Huang only)); 6. 人间 (Mortal World); 7. 后来 (Afterwards); 8. 骑士 （合唱）(Knight); 9. 红眼睛 (Red Weeping Eyes (Zhou Shen only)); 10. 来不及勇敢 (Too Late to be Brave (Isabelle Huang only)); 11. 痒 (Tickle (Isabelle Huang only)); 12. 等待 (Waiting (Isabelle Huang only)); 13. 离骚 (The Lament (Zhou Shen only)); 14. 心动+我要我们在一起 (Tempting Heart + I Want Us to Be Together (Zhou Shen only)); 15. 太后 (Lady Empress (Isabelle Huang only)); 16. HIGH歌（合唱）(HIGH Song)
TME Live "Good Night, See You Tomorrow"	Released: July 29, 2020; Label: Tencent Music Entertainment Group; Formats: Digital download, streaming; Track listing: 1. 来不及勇敢 (Too Late to Be Brave); 2. 雪花落下 (Snowflakes Falling); 3. 曾经沧海 (Vicissitudes of Life); 4. 随风 (Flow with the Wind); 5. 大鱼 (Big Fish); 6. 避难所 (Sanctuary); 7. 愿 (Wish); 8. 梅香如故 (Plum Blossom Remains); 9. 影 (Ying (Shadow)); 10. 海藏 (Hai Cang (Sea Pearl)); 11. 触不可及 (The Upside); 12. 谢谢你听过我唱的这些歌 (Thank You for Listening to My OSTs); 13. 不想睡 (Can't Fall Asleep)

== Singles ==
Title	Year	Peak chart positions
Title	Year	CHN
"The Rose and The Deer" (玫瑰与小鹿)	2015	—
"Once in Lifetime" (一期一会)	2017	—
"Blossom" (花开)	2018	—
"Yet it Love This World" (可它爱著这个世界)	2018	37
"Sorry" (对不起) with Panta.Q	2018	—
"Butterfly Lovers" (楼台) with Seven Zhu Qi	2018	—
"Never Say Goodbye" (不说再见)	2019	30
"The Doomsday Spacecraft" (末日飞船) with Sean Tang	2019	—
"Cassini" (卡西尼) with Sean Tang	2019	—
"Aspiration of a Hutong Boy" (胡同少年志)	2019	13
"A Thousand Sails Passed by" (过尽千帆)	2019	11
"Beautiful Prophecy" (念念有词)	2019	—
"Extraordinary" (不群)	2019	—
"Leaving With No Greeting" (不见就散) with Hacken Lee	2020	1
"Hint" (暗示)	2020	—
"Utterance" (话语) with Panta.Q	2020	—
"Don't Wanna Sleep" (不想睡)	2020	—
"A Lonely Whale Living Like An Island" (化身孤岛的鲸)	2020	15
"Who Am I to You" (我是你的谁)	2020	1
"Restrained Love" (情不由衷)	2020	8
"Senior Mediocre" (资深庸才) with 王子zione	2020	—
"Painting Silk" (画绢)	2020	4
"I'm Fine Here" (我在这 挺好的)	2021	16
"Expectation" (Five Blessings Valentine's Special Edition)" ("望" (五福情人节特别版))	2021	—
"May Wind Over the Ridge of Field" (田埂五月风(哼唱版))	2021	—
"Born to Win" (生而为赢)	2021	11
"Longing for Reunion" (若思念便思念)	2021	4
"One Earth One Spring" (和光同春)	2021	10
"Today Is Your Birthday, China" (今天是你的生日，中国)	2021	28
"Song of Majesty" (威风吟)	2021	2
"Silver Linings" (光亮)	2021	1
"Florasis" (Multi-Language Version)" (花西子(国际版))	2021	9
"Enjoying Life Makes A Beautiful Life" (好好生活就是美好生活)	2021	4
"Hurry Towards" (奔赴)	2021	—
"Take the Field" (出場)	2022	5
"Star Fish" (星鱼)	2022	1
"Sweet Dreams" (可梦)	2022	13
"Follow Our Dream" (梦想指路)	2022	35
"My Answer" (我的答案)	2022	—
"Have A Good Sleep" (睡个好觉)	2022	1
"Count On Me" (有我)	2022	1
"Blessing You" (祝福)	2022	49
"May Wind Over the Ridge of Field" (田埂五月风)	2022	2
"Worry-free When Blossom" (花开忘忧)	2022	1
"Beauty with Beauty" (美美)	2022	2
"The Most Precious You" (最珍贵的你)	2022	2
"Super Player" (超级玩家)	2022	3
"Lead to Infinity" (奔向你)	2022	2
"Nice to Meet You" (很高兴遇见你)	2022	2
"Fleeting Time" (流光)	2022	5
"Wonderland of Music: Disney Animation Beloved Suite" (奇遇乐章: 迪士尼动画挚爱组曲)	2022	1
"Try and Thrive" (一试有成)	2022	1
"Prayers for Mountains and Seas" (祈愿山海)	2023	22
"My Heart Lands at My Hometown" (心归处是吾乡)	2023	81
"Tomorrow Is A Better Day" (明天的世界更美好)	2023	4
"My Hometown People" (家乡人) with Mao Buyi	2023	52
"Heart of Peace" with ZHANGYE	2023	1
"A Long Journey of Dreams" (梦想的远征)	2023	63
"As Pledged" (如许)	2023	3
"Go Alongside" (同行同往)	2023	38
"Summertime Imagination" (夏日妄想) with Mai Mizuhashi	2023	51
"Concentric Circles" (同心圆)	2023	1
"To Future, With Love" (爱达未来)	2023	—
"Heart of Peace" (Ummet Ozcan Remix)	2023	—
"Floating Light" (浮光)	2023	—
"At Your Side" (身边)	2024	3
"Spring Snow" (春雪) with Terry Zhong	2024	9
"Ode to Peace" (和平颂)	2024	46
"Miracle Moment" (奇迹时刻)	2024	5
"Red Star Shines Brightly" (红星闪闪亮)	2024	29
"Set Out for Tomorrow" (去明天)	2024	8
"Three Meals and Four Seasons" (三餐四季)	2024	19
"Whiling Away the Summer" (消夏图)	2024	4
"Offer Time to You" (奉时光予你）)	2024	4
"Sharing the Same Wish"（心同此愿）	2024	5
"Notice Me"（看见我）	2024	16

== Soundtrack appearances ==
English title	Chinese title	Year	Notes
Big Fish	大鱼	2016	Image song of Big Fish & Begonia
Early Rain in Lin-an	临安初雨	2016	Theme song of Mobile Game Water Margin Q (水浒Q传)
Echoes	回声	2017	Ending song of The Starry Night, The Starry Sea
Wings of Dawn	黎明的翅膀	2017	Ending song of Animation DNF:The Fate of Arad (阿拉德：宿命之门)
Calm Romance	浓情淡如你	2017	Promotional song of Brotherhood of Blades II: The Infernal Battlefield
Speechless	不说话	2017	Concept song of Dahufa
Vicissitudes of Life	曾经沧海	2017	Ending song of The Starry Night, The Starry Sea
Wherever to Go	何处是天涯	2017	Theme song of Legend of the Phoenix
Rubbish Don't Bother Me	垃圾别烦我	2017	Cleaning theme song of Tencent Mobile Manager
If You Love Me	如果你爱我	2018	Theme song of the novel To Love You, To Save Me (许我向你看)
The Shape of Water	水形物语	2018	Promotional song" (in China) of The Shape of Water
Independence	无关	2018	Promotional song of the film A or B (幕后玩家)
Waiting for me	等着我	2018	Theme song of the reality show Waiting for Me (等着我)
Song of a Deity's Apparel (Yun Chang Yu Yi Qu)	云裳羽衣曲	2018	Theme song of 3D Dressup Game Yun Chang (云裳羽衣)
Farewell Dream	梦留别	2018	Theme song of Game Moonlight Blade, YiHua Family (天涯明月刀)移花门派）
Late for Gallantry	来不及勇敢	2018	Confessional song of Crystal Sky of Yesterday (昨日青空)
Monologue	独白	2018	Interlude song of The Destiny of White Snake
Endless Story	没有说完的故事	2018	Ending song of Kungfood (美食大冒险之英雄烩)
Missing you	念	2018	Promotional song of Stage Play JX Online: Legend of Qu Yun (剑网3：曲云传)
Plum Blossom Remain	梅香如故	2018	With Mao Bu Yi; Ending song of Ruyi's Royal Love in the Palace
Dream to Imperial City	梦回神都	2018	Theme song of Mobile Game Phantom in The City of Tang (神都夜行录)
Plum Blossom Remain	梅香如故	2018	Solo Ver.; Ending Song of Ruyi's Royal Love in the Palace
The Cowherd and the Weaver Girl	牛郎织女	2018	Poverty alleviation art song produced by China Federation of Literary and Art Circles
Regretful Youth	青春有悔	2018	OST of Stage Play Three Buddies (我的小伙伴)之(青春没烦恼)
Genesis	缘起	2018	Promotional song and ending song of White Snake
With the Wind	随风	2019	Interlude song of Mystery of Antiques (古董局中局)
Only You	此生惟你	2019	Interlude song of Heavenly Sword and Dragon Slaying Sabre
Fallen Petals	落花	2019	Interlude song of Yanyangchun (燕阳春)
Metamorphosis	蜕	2019	Theme song of Animation Battle Through the Heavens Special II: Song of Desert (斗破苍穹特别篇2·沙之澜歌)
Humble Admiration	拙慕	2019	Interlude song of L.O.R.D. Critical World (爵迹·临界天下）)
Pursuit for Love	为爱追寻	2019	Theme song of NetEase MMORPG Fantasy Westward Journey
Break through the Heaven	直破穹苍	2019	Theme song and ending song of Animation Battle Through the Heavens (斗破苍穹)
Huang Cheng Du (Passing by the Deserted City)	荒城渡	2019	Character song of Xue Yang in Web series The Untamed
Wandering no more	不再流浪	2019	Promotional song of The Legend of Hei (罗小黑战记)
Love Knot	情意结	2019	Ending song of Jade Dynasty 1 (诛仙 I)
Sanctuary	避难所	2019	Interlude song of Waiting for You in the Future; this is Zhou Shen's first original English song
Journey to the East	东游	2019	Theme song of Journey to the East (东游)
Hai Cang (Sea Pearl)	海藏	2019	Theme song and ending song of Animation Beyond the Ocean S2 (四海鲸骑)
Longing for a Wholehearted Lover	愿得一心人	2019	Theme song of the television series Royal Nirvana (鹤唳华亭)
The Painted Crane	放鹤图	2019	Character song of Xiao Dingquan in the television series Royal Nirvana (鹤唳华亭)
The Upside	触不可及	2019	Promotional song of The Upside (触不可及)
The Answer to Everything	能解答一切的答案	2019	Ending song for the movie Mr. Miao (妙先生)
Wish	愿	2019	Theme song of Under The Power (锦衣之下)
Listen to Me	听我说	2020	Theme song of Alipay 2020 New Year Short Film Waiting for You (到哪儿了)
Please Believe in A Dream	请笃信一个梦	2020	Ending theme song of Legend of Deification (姜子牙)
Longing to Meet You	渴望遇見	2020	Theme song of Everyone Wants to Meet You (谁都渴望遇见你)
Snowflakes Falling	雪花落下	2020	One of the theme songs of the TV series Skate into Love (冰糖炖雪梨)
A Fleeting Epiphyllum with Timely Rain	昙花一现雨及时	2020	Theme song of TV series Love of Thousand Years (三千鸦杀); with Zheng Yunlong
Love Like Colored Glass	爱若琉璃	2020	Theme song of TV series Love and Redemption (琉璃美人煞)
Something Beautiful Happening	有一件美好的事情将要发生	2020	Theme song of TV series Imperfect Love (不完美的她)
Enlightenment	启示	2020	Promotional song of DNF:Reversal of Fate (地下城与勇士·逆转之轮)
Vision · Ultra-premium	瞳·出类拔萃	2020	Promotional song of One Plus 8
Leave for Hermitage	拂衣归	2020	Character song of Zhang Liang in Chinese animated TV series The Legend of Qin
The End of Our Predestined Fate	缘落	2020	Ending theme song of And the Winner Is Love (月上重火); with Rover Lu Hu
Have Faith In The Universe	天地为念	2020	Theme song of Chinese Animation Legend of Exorcism (天宝伏妖录)
Hua Xi Zi (Florasis Beauty)	花西子	2020	Promotional song of Florasis（花西子）
Ying (Shadow)	影	2020	Theme song of TV series The Song of Glory (锦绣南歌)
With Thou	与卿	2020	Theme song of Mobile Game The Master Is In Charge (掌门太忙)
Captain Kabule	卡布叻船长	2020	Theme song of Mobile Game Dragon Nest II (龙之谷2)
Infinite	无限	2020	Ending song of TV series (The Lost Tomb) Reunion: The Sound of the Providence (盗墓笔记重启之极海听雷)
The Spark of Wildland	荒原星火	2020	Theme song of Online Game Gujian Online" (Legend of the Ancient Sword Online) 2020 Edition
Glimmer on the Ocean	微光海洋	2020	Character song of Da Qiao and Sun Ce in the mobile MOBA game Honor of Kings (王者荣耀)
The Story of Us (Happiness)	幸福里	2020	Ending song of Happiness in Spring (幸福里的故事)
Sea Butterfly	海上蝶	2020	Theme song of annual game plot edition of Mobile Game Onmyoji: The Card Game (阴阳师百闻牌)———The Night House of Music • Chapter "Echo" (夜之乐屋·回响篇)
Soften the Glare, Unify as Dust	和光同尘	2020	Theme song of TV series Like a Flowing River 2 (大江大河2)
Seeking Bosom Friend in Jiang-hu	江湖觅知音	2020	First Anniversary theme song of The Legendary Swordsman Mobile (新笑傲江湖)
Stay Together	相守	2020	Theme song of Video Game The Legend of Sword and Fairy 7" (aka Chinese Paladin 7) ( 仙剑奇侠传七)
The End of the Earth	天涯尽处	2021	Theme song of TV series Monarch Industry (上阳赋); with Hu Xia
I'm Not Afraid	无所畏惧	2021	Theme song of Extension pack of the year---"Dragon Training Mission" from mobile game Battle of Balls (球球大作战)
The Place of Belonging	归处	2021	Theme song of The Yinyang Master (侍神令)
I, Jiang-hu!	我，江湖！	2021	3rd anniversary theme song of NetEase mobile game A Dream of Jiang-hu (一梦江湖)
Expectation	望	2021	Theme song of "Collecting Five Blessings" of Alipay
Moon Legend	明月传说	2021	Theme song of Da Tang Ming Yue (风起霓裳)
Rubia	Rubia	2021	Image song of Animated Short -- "Shattered Samsara" (渡尘)from mobile game Honkai Impact 3rd (崩坏3)
The Vast Galaxy	茫茫星河	2021	Theme song of TV series The Blessed Girl (玲珑)
Like A Dream	若梦	2021	Theme song of TV series Stand By Me (与君歌)
Be Together	要一起	2021	Theme song of TV series The Sword and the Brocade / Brilliant Heart Like Jade (锦心似玉)
A Love For Dilemma	小舍得	2021	Theme song of A Love for Dilemma (小舍得)
Cocoon (Fetter)	茧	2021	Ending song of TV series The Long Ballad (长歌行)
Exchange	交换	2021	Theme song of Miss Crow with Mr. Lizard (乌鸦小姐与蜥蜴先生)
Cliff Walkers	悬崖之上	2021	Theme song of Cliff Walkers (悬崖之上)
Faith	理想	2021	Theme song of Faith Makes Great (理想照耀中国); with various artists
The Starry Sky	繁星璀璨的天空	2021	Tribute Song of The Glory and the Dream (光荣与梦想)
Incomparable Love	玦恋	2021	Theme song of TV series Ancient Love Poetry (千古玦尘)
The Dancing Moonlight	跳舞的月光	2021	Emotional theme song of The Day We Lit Up the Sky (燃野少年的天空)
Asking Flowers	问花	2021	Theme song of White Snake 2: The Tribulation of the Green Snake (白蛇2：青蛇劫起)
Genesis of Jiang-hu	江湖缘起	2021	Theme song of online game JX Online 3 - Genesis (剑网三缘起)
Friendship Under the Summer Sky	夏日友晴天	2021	Chinese Theme song of Luca (夏日友晴天)
Life Should Always Face the Light	生活总该迎着光亮	2021	Theme song of TV series The Bond (乔家的儿女 )
End in Nothing	无疾而终	2021	Romantic Theme song of 2021 TV series Demi-Gods and Semi-Devil (天龙八部)
Ties of Time	时结	2021	Theme song of Honor of Chinese Culture Festival（荣耀中国节）
Only for Truth	只为真相	2021	Ending theme song of the web series Truth (真相)
The Best Present	最好的礼物	2021	Theme song of the web series The Pavilion (八角亭谜雾)
A Beautiful World	美好的世界	2021	Theme song of the film Knock Knock (不速來客)
Kiss Me With All Your Heart	以无旁骛之吻	2021	Ending song of the TV series Novoland: Pearl Eclipse (斛珠夫人)
Lend Me a Box of Matches	借给我一盒火柴	2021	Theme song of the TV series Ebola Fighters (埃博拉前线)
Say Hello	说声你好	2021	Opening song of the TV series A Little Mood for Love (小敏家)
Like A Bird	像鸟儿一样	2021	Theme song of Enemy (对手)
You Are My City	你是我的城	2022	Theme song of the TV series Perfect Match (完美伴侣)
My Only	My Only	2022	Ending theme song of the TV series Reset (开端)
Returning Home	念归去	2022	Theme song of the TV series Mirror: A Tale of Twin Cities (镜·双城)
Come Back to You	回到你身边	2022	New wish song from the motion picture Nice View (奇迹·笨小孩)
Guang District	光字片	2022	Song from the TV series A Lifelong Journey (人世间)
Care About	在意	2022	Ending song of the TV series Challenges At Midlife (相逢时节)
Song of Merman (Mermaid Song)	鲛人之歌	2022	Ending song from TV drama The Blue Whisper (与君初相见)
Dear You	卿卿	2022	Theme song of the TV drama My Sassy Princess (祝卿好)
The Journey	征途	2022	Theme song of the Xinhuanet documentary series The Remarkable Journey (了不起的征途)
Lycoris Radiata	彼岸花	2022	Theme song of the TV drama The Unknown: Legend of Exorcist Zhong Kui (问天录)
Shine Upon the Galaxy (Illuminate the Night Sky)	照耀星河	2022	Theme song of the TV drama Love in Flames of War (良辰好知几何)
I See Us	I See Us	2022	Theme song of the TV drama My Superhero (欢迎光临)
Legacy	传家	2022	Theme song of the TV drama Legacy (传家)
One in Ten Thousand	万里挑一	2022	Theme song of the TV drama Dr. Tang (关于唐医生的一切)
Sail With Romance	请带着浪漫远航	2022	Theme song of the animated film Rainbow Sea Fly High (冲出地球)
A Man Chasing Spring	追赶春天的人	2022	Ending song of the film Close to Love (我们的样子像极了爱情)
The Way You Are	你的样子	2022	Theme song of the film Close to Love (我们的样子像极了爱情)
Rebirth	重生	2022	Theme song of the animated drama The Jia Lan College: Battle Through the Heavens Annual EPs (斗破苍穹年番·迦南学院)
Later But Without You	后来没有你	2022	Emotion theme song of regret for the film Close to Love (我们的样子像极了爱情)
Unfinished Love	余情	2022	Theme song of the TV drama Love Between Fairy and Devil (苍兰诀)
Toward the Light	向光而行	2022	Theme song of the documentary interview series This Decade - In Pursuit of Light (这十年·追光者)
Kite Is A Letter of The Wind	风筝是风的信	2022	Interlude song of the film Close to Love (我们的样子像极了爱情)
Fireworks	焰火	2022	Theme song of the TV drama series Lighter & Princess (点燃我，温暖你)
Chasing the Moon	逐月	2022	Theme song of the drama series Song of the Moon (月歌行)
Wind Rises in Fleeting Times	风起流年	2022	Theme song of the TV drama series Weaving a Tale of Love S2 (风起西州)
Milkyway in the World	人间星河	2022	Theme song of the TV drama series Dawn Breaking in East (破晓东方)
What Is Human	人是_	2023	Theme song of the film The Wandering Earth II (流浪地球2)
Eternal Loneliness	永恒孤独	2023	Theme song for the TV series Three-Body (三体)
Endless Sailing	Endless Sailing	2023	Theme song for the TV series Three-Body (三体); this is the English version of "Eternal Loneliness" (永恒孤独), also sung by Zhou Shen
Sprout	芽	2023	Theme song for the reality show Become a Farmer (种地吧)
The Will Remains	意犹在	2023	Theme song for the animated series White Cat Legend II (大理寺日志 第二季)
Suzume	铃芽之旅	2023	Chinese version of the theme song for Suzume (铃芽之旅)
Free-floating	浮游	2023	Theme song of the TV drama Back From The Brink (护心)
Still Worth It	也很值得	2023	Ending song of the drama series Gen Z (后浪)
Brilliant Adventurers	璀璨冒險人	2023	Theme song for the animated TV series Soul Land II: The Unrivaled Tang Sect (斗罗大陆II绝世唐门)
Clearly (Ming Ming)	明明	2023	Theme song of the TV drama The Legend of Zhuohua (灼灼风流)
The Sea of Time	时间之海	2023	Theme song of the TV drama I Am Nobody (异人之下)
Her	她	2023	Theme song of the TV drama Alliance (好事成双)
Flowers Remain in Bloom	繁花依旧	2023	Theme song of the film Volunteers: Xiongbing Attack (志愿军：雄兵出击)
Summerlike	似夏	2023	Theme song of the drama series Blooming Days (岁岁青莲)
Stray	迷途	2023	Theme song of the drama series Love Is Panacea (治愈系恋人)
Passenger	过客	2023	Theme song of the TV drama Only for Love (以爱为营)
Journey	旅途	2023	Song from the TV drama There Will Be Ample Time (故乡，别来无恙)
Borrowing a Dream	借梦	2023	The "dream" theme song of the TV drama Story of Kunning Palace (宁安如梦)
Love from a Small Me	我以渺小爱你	2023	Charity theme song for the documentary program for the environmental protection On The Way
I'm a Star	I'm a Star	2023	Mandarin single version of I'm a Star from the Disney animated film Wish
Vestige	痕迹	2024	Theme song for the drama series Born to Run (如果奔跑是我的人生)
Resonance	共鸣	2024	Ending theme song for the drama series Sword and Fairy (祈今朝)
Little Happiness" (Little Joys)	小美满	2024	Interlude song from the motion picture YOLO (热辣滚烫)
Door	门	2024	Theme song of the drama series In Blossom (花间令)
Not As You Imagine	非你所想	2024	Theme song of the drama series War of Faith (追风者)
Remember	记得	2024	Theme song of love from the drama series Best Choice Ever (承欢记)
Passing Through, Excuse Me	借过一下	2024	Ending theme song for the drama series Joy of Life 2 (庆余年第二季)
One Short Moment	一晌	2024	Song of marriage/ending song for the TV drama Fox Spirit Matchmaker: Red-Moon Pact
The Morning Light in the Breeze	风吹过的晨曦	2024	Song from the drama series The Tale of Rose (玫瑰的故事)
The Kite by the Cloud (Wang Ying Ying)	云边的风筝（我们的王莺莺）	2024	Character song from the film Moments We Share (云边有个小卖部)
Decoded	解密	2024	Mandarin version of the theme song for the film Decoded (解密)
Boating While Seeking	行舟问柳	2024	Theme song of the drama series Are You the One (柳舟记）)
China in Intangible Culture Heritage	非遗里的中国	2024	Theme song of the CCTV show China in Intangible Culture Heritage (非遗里的中国）)
A Fleeting Moment for a Lifetime	一生一瞬	2024	Theme song of the drama series Snowy Night: Timeless Love（七夜雪）
Light in My Heart	心海里的光	2025	Ending theme song of the drama Legend of The Female General (锦月如歌)
The Person Who Fixes Stars	修星星的人	2026	Ending theme song of the mainland Chinese release of Project Hail Mary

== Collaborations ==
English title	Chinese title	Year	Notes
Great Luck Great Drumsticks	大吉大利大鸡腿	2017	Lunar New Year song of The Year of Rooster
This Is Young	青春就这Young	2020	Theme song of Youth Periplous 2 (青春环游记2)
Go Newbies	新手驾到	2020	Theme song of Go Newbies (新手驾到)
Faith	理想	2021	Theme song of Faith Makes Great (理想照耀中国)
The Internationale	国际歌	2021	Theme song of 1921
China, Go!	中国加油歌	2021	Theme song of TMall for 2020 Summer Olympics
Salute to the Heroes	致敬勇士	2021	Promotional song for the award ceremony of Beijing 2022 Olympic and Paralympic Winter Games
Together for a Shared Future	一起向未来	2022	Promotional theme song of the Beijing 2022 Olympic and Paralympic Winter Games
Chapter	篇章	2022	Theme song of The Treasured Voice 3（天赐的声音3）
Let's Sail Together	我们一起远航	2022	With Tan Weiwei, Liu Hegang, and Lu Binqi
Our Song	我们的歌	2022	A group song sung by Zhou Shen and various artists
Now Until the Future	从现在 到未来	2023	Promotional theme song for the 19th Asian Games Hangzhou 2022
Tomorrow Will Be Better	2024明天会更好	2023	A cover of the 1985 song "Tomorrow Will Be Better" by various artists
