= Mika Hashizume =

Japanese-American singer and model (born 1998)

mikah
- 橋爪ミカ
- Born: Mika Hashizume; December 21, 1998 (age 27); Honolulu, Hawaii, U.S.
- Education: Temple University
- Occupations: Singer-Songwriter; Model
- Musical career
- Genres: Pop; R&B
- Instrument: Vocals
- Years active: 2017–present
- Label: Avex

Mika Hashizume (Japanese: 橋爪ミカ, Hepburn: Hashizume Mika; born 21 December 1998), known mononymously as Mikah (stylized mikah), is a Japanese-American singer-songwriter and model.

He was a member of the Japanese-American boy group INTERSECTION and was subsequently in the Chinese boy group Into1 after placing fourth in the hit Chinese reality competition program Chuang 2021.

In December 2023, Mikah released his digital EP “bleached” and officially launched his solo career as a singer-songwriter.

== Personal life ==
Mikah was born on 21 December 1998, in Hawaii, to a German father and a Japanese mother. He lived in Hawaii for 16 years, and attended University Laboratory School, a charter school in Honolulu, Hawai‘i. In 2016, Mikah moved to Japan alone after being recruited by a Japanese agency Avex. He attended an international school and continued on to Temple University, Japan Campus in Tokyo, where he also began his music career.

Mikah played soccer from the ages of 9 to 15 and dreamed of becoming a professional player. He won the Hawaii state championship for his age group.

Mikah has also played violin and ukulele from a young age.

== Career ==
In 2017, Mikah became a member of the Japanese-American boy group INTERSECTION. They released their first single in 2017 with "Starting Over" but officially debuted in 2018 with "Heart of Gold".

In December 2018, Mikah released his first solo single "Tell Me". In March 2019, he released his second single "Road Trips".

Mikah and two other members of Intersection took part in the Chinese survival reality program CHUANG 2021. On the final episode, Mikah placed fourth and became a member of the multi-national boy group INTO1.

During his two years of activity with INTO1, he released cover songs and singles, such as "Beautiful".

After being a part of two boy groups in America, Japan, and China, he released his 1st EP, bleached, in December 2023, officially starting his solo singer-songwriter career. In 2024, he released his 2nd EP, Pretty Lies, in all English, and increased his presence as a global artist with his first performance at SUMMER SONIC (Tokyo) as well as the Meta Moon Festival in Dubai. The live performance video of his hit song "so I don't forget" gained 8 million views on YouTube.

In 2025, he started a collaboration with 88rising.

== Ambassadorships and endorsements ==
Mikah has featured on the cover of magazines such as Harper's Bazaar Men, L'Officiel Hommes, Madame Figaro, WSJ Magazine, Elle Men, and Nylon.

He has also modelled for luxury brands, such as Louis Vuitton, Bottega Veneta, Celine, Boucheron, Gucci, Tiffany & Co., and Burberry, as well as walked for Haute couture House Robert Wun during Paris Haute Couture Week in January 2024.

Year	Role	Brand	Ref.
2021	Brand Ambassador	Clarins	
2021	Brand Friend	Yves Saint Laurent	
2021	Spokesperson	Marumi	
2021	Brand Ambassador	Red Earth	
2021	Brand Ambassador	Darlie Toothpaste	
2021	Brand Ambassador	Urban Revivo	
2021	Brand Ambassador	Addiction Tokyo	
2021	Spokesperson	Pocky	
2021	Brand Ambassador	Nescafé	
2021	Brand Ambassador	NARS	
2021	House Friend	Moncler	
2022	Brand Ambassador	Kappa	
2022	Brand Friend	Tiffany & Co.	
2023	Asia Pacific Spokesperson	Diesel (Watch and Accessories)	
2023	House Friend	Bottega Veneta	
2023	Brand Ambassador	Filorga	
2023	Brand Ambassador	American Tourister	
2024	Asia Pacific Spokesperson	Maui Jim	
2024	Brand Ambassador	Fila	
2024	Brand Ambassador	Kiehl's	
2024	Brand Ambassador	Pop Mart Mobile Game "Dream Home"	
2024	Brand Ambassador	Molly Tea	
2024	Collaboration	Burberry	
2024	Collaboration	Hey Tea x Yayoi Kusama	
2024	Collaboration	Nike ACG	

== Discography ==
=== Extended plays ===
Title	Details	Tracklist	Sales
bleached	Released: December 21, 2023; Label: Avex Trax, TME Label; Formats: Vinyl, CD, digital download, streaming	1. stupid love 2. melancholy song 3. forever you 4. 那一刻我觉得这世上不会有比我更喜欢你的人了 (at that moment); 5. so I don't forget	Platinum
PRETTY LIES	Scheduled: November 22, 2024; Label: Avex Trax; Formats: digital download, streaming	1. MAYBE IT'S ME; 2. TOO HARD TO; 3. UNDERNEATH THE SURFACE; 4. CHASING PARADISE; 5. MISS YOU	

=== English singles ===
Year	Title	Note
2018	"Tell Me"	
2019	"Road Trips"	
2025	"Butterflies"	feat. 88rising
2025	"Escape"	"Homesick" Triology, Chapter I

=== Chinese singles ===
2022	"说好的约定 (Just Wanna)"	Single by Sprite Summer Limited Refreshing Music Label
2022	"输入法打可爱按第五 (Push No.5 for Cute in Input Method)"	a.k.a "Say Sweet"
2022	"回眸一夏 Summer Time"	
2024	"Snow of Fate (初雪来信)"	
2024	"所向 (Towards)"	Theme song of Pop Mart Mobile Game "Dream Home"
2024	"要是来不及 (Too Late)"	
2024	"Deep Dive 深潜"	Feat. One&Two, Lona
2025	"瓶颈关系 (Situationship)"	
2025	"昨天 (Yesterday)"	
2025	"你的陷阱 (One and Only)	Feat. Sharon Kwan

=== Soundtracks ===
Year	Title	Note
2021	"陷入爱情 Fall in Love" (feat. Curley G)	Soundtrack of You Are My Glory (starring Dilraba Dilmurat, Yang Yang)
2024	"听你诉说 Your Love Whisper" (feat. Curley G)	Opening theme song of "我们的翻译官 Our Interpreter" (starring Victoria Song, Chen Xingxu)
2024	"花印 Flower Print"	Soundtrack of "惜花芷 Blossoms in Adversity" (starring Zhang Jingyi, Hu Yitian)
2024	"手植玫瑰 Growing Rose"	Soundtrack of The Tale of Rose (starring Liu Yifei)
2024	"执爱 Devoted Love"	Soundtrack of "度华年 The Princess Royal" (starring Zhao Jinmai, Zhang Linghe)
2025	"Loving You"	Soundtrack of "The Best Thing 爱你 (2025)" (starring Zhang Linghe, Xu Ruohan)
2025	"偏爱 (The Chosen One)"	Theme song of a dating reality show 偏爱之恋 Love Wins All by Youku

=== Other songs ===
Year	Title	Note
2022	"Beautiful"	Original by Crush Mikah's cover single is the Chinese adaption of the soundtrack of K-drama Guardian: The Lonely and Great God
2022	"Trust Me"	Original by sunkis
2022	"Take Me To Your Heart"	Original by Jacky Cheung (The Goodbye Kiss)
2022	"11"	Original by Young Captain
2022	"想太多 Thinking Too Much"	Original by Nicky Lee
2022	"约定Promises"	Original by Where Chou
2022	"Melody"	Original by Ziv & KIPES. Mikah's cover single is produced by 陶乐然DOLLARZOO
2023	"Always"	Original by Yoon Mi-rae Mikah's cover single is the Chinese adaption of the soundtrack of K-drama Descendants of the Sun
2023	"永不失联的爱 Unbreakable Love"	Original by Eric Chou
2024	"答应不爱你 Promise Not to Love You"	Soundtrack of Chinese Paladin 3 original by Ronald Cheng

=== Writing credits ===
Year	Artist	Song	Credits
2018	mikah	"Tell Me"	Composition, Lyrics, Arrangement, Production
2019	mikah	"Road Trips"	Composition, Lyrics, Arrangement, Production
2022	mikah	"For you"	Lyrics
2022	mikah	"Addiction"	Composition, Lyrics, Arrangement
2022	INTO1	"Together Somewhere"	Lyrics
2023	mikah	"stupid love"	Lyrics, Arrangement, Production
2023	mikah	"melancholy song"	Composition, Lyrics, Arrangement, Production
2023	mikah	"forever you"	Composition
2024	mikah	"MAYBE IT'S ME"	Composition, Lyrics
2024	mikah	"TOO HARD TO"	Composition, Lyrics
2024	mikah	"UNDERNEATH THE SURFACE"	Composition, Lyrics
2024	mikah	"CHASING PARADISE"	Composition, Lyrics
2024	mikah	"MISS YOU"	Composition, Lyrics
	mikah	"Butterflies"	Composition, Lyrics
	mikah	"Escape"	Composition, Lyrics

== Filmography ==
=== Variety shows ===
Year	Title	Songs Performed	Notes	Ref.
2021	Produce Camp 2021 (创造营2021）	Ep.1; "Swim" (original by Chase Atlantic); "So Sick" (original by Ne-Yo); "永不失联的爱 Unbreakable Love" (original by Eric Chou); "怪天气 Strange Weather" (original by YELLOW黄宣）; Ep. 3: "醉拳 Drunken Master" (original by Jackie Chan); Ep. 4: "Dream" (co-produced remake version by Mikah); Ep. 6: "你就不要想起我 You Better Not Think About Me" (original by Hebe Tien); Ep. 8: "输入法打可爱按第五 Push No.5 for Cute in Input Method"; Ep. 10: "Flower" (original by Johnny Stimson); "Be Mine"	Survival show determining Into1 Members; Placed 4th	
2022	The Treasured Voice: Season 3 天赐的声音 第三季	1. "Melody" (feat. Tracy Wang) (original by David Tao); 2. "City of Stars" (feat. Zhou Shen); 3. "种子 Seeds" (feat. Hu Haiquan) (original by Yu Quan)	Guest (Ep. 8–9)	
2022	E-Pop Of China 超感星电音	1. "红豆 Red Beans" (original by Khalil Fong, Faye Wong); 2. "For You" (feat. Chuck Tour); 3. "Addiction" (feat. JTK); 4. "香水有毒 Poisonous Perfume" (feat. 金贵晟); 5. "当我们老了 When we are old" (feat. 金贵晟); 6. "OPEN CAR" (feat. Danko, 金贵晟); 7. "Relax" (feat. 金贵晟); 8. "Ones You Miss" (feat. Chuck Tour) (original by R3hab)	Cast Member	
2023	Ring A Bell 剧好听的歌	1. "Beautiful"; 2. "因为爱情 Because of Love" (feat. Tia Ray) (original by Eason Chan and Faye Wong); 3. "Forever Star" (soundtrack of "Hidden Love (TV series)" (starring Zhao Lusi, Chen Zheyuan)	Guest (Ep. 6–10)	
2023	Our Song 我们的歌	1. "情人 The Love" (feat. Alex To, Mike Tsang) (original by Alex To); 2. stupid love	Guest (Ep. 8)	
2024	The Treasured Voice: Season 5 天赐的声音 第五季	"瘦子 Skinny Love" (feat. Baby Zhang) (original by Dean Ting)	Guest (Ep. 7)	
