= Silence Wang =

Chinese pop singer and songwriter (born 1989)

- 汪苏泷
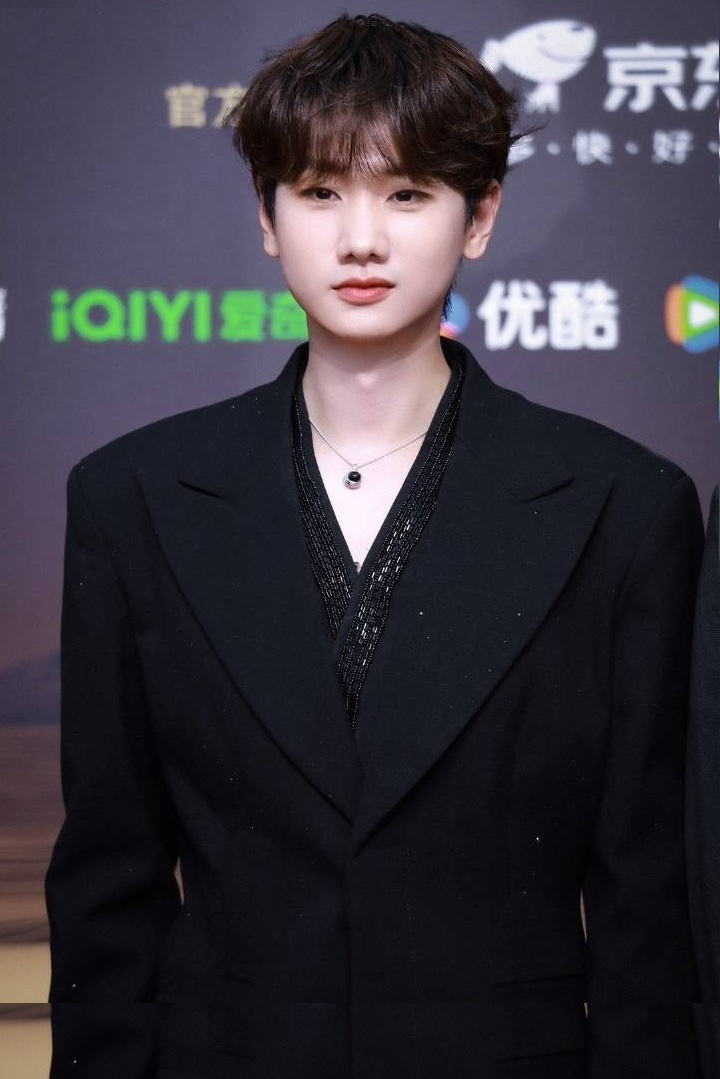
- Wang at the 2024 Weibo Music Awards
- Born: 17 September 1989 (age 37); Shenyang, Liaoning, China
- Other name: Wang Sulong
- Education: Shenyang Conservatory of Music
- Occupations: Singer-songwriter; record producer
- Years active: 2010–present
- Height: 176.5 cm (5 ft 9.5 in)
- Musical career
- Genre: Mandopop
- Instruments: Vocals; piano; guitar; keyboard; drums; flute
- Label: Image Music

Chinese name
- Simplified Chinese: 汪苏泷
- Traditional Chinese: 汪蘇瀧
Transcriptions
Standard Mandarin
- Hanyu Pinyin: Wāng Sūlóng

Wang Sulong (Chinese: 汪苏泷; pinyin: Wāng Sūlóng; born 17 September 1989), professionally known in English as Silence Wang, is a Chinese singer-songwriter and record producer. He made his debut with the album Dreams Come True (慢慢懂) on 19 November 2010, and is a prolific songwriter with varied musical styles, ranging from R&B, EDM, and rap, to classical and contemporary pop. Wang has released 13 albums, including the conceptual creative collection Crossover (联名) and its sequel Crossover 2.0, compilations featuring his bespoke songwriting for diverse female vocalists, each song tailored to the artist's individual style. He is one of the top Mandopop artists from mainland China streamed on Spotify.

== Early life and education ==
Wang was born on 17 September 1989 in Shenyang, Liaoning. He is an ethnic Manchu. Raised in a musical household, Silence Wang developed a strong interest in music since his childhood and began playing the piano at an early age. He studied classical music in junior high school and was admitted to the Middle School of Shenyang Conservatory of Music in high school. He graduated from the Undergraduate Music Department of Shenyang Conservatory of Music, majoring in classical music composition.

== Career ==
=== 2010–2013: Debut and rise to fame ===
During his time in University, Wang released his own works on music streaming websites and topped multiple music charts, including QQ Music's overall artist chart. He was then signed by Taiwanese record label Wonderful Music and started his career as a professional singer-songwriter.

In August 2012, he released his second album, titled Gravitation, with Wonderful Music, which included the hit song "A Little Sweet" (有点甜) with BY2. On 30 March 2013, he won the 20th Chinese Top Ten Music Awards Best New Artist award.

=== 2014–2020: Record label disputes and new beginnings ===
In 2014, Wang terminated his contract with record label Wonderful Music amidst disputes that the label sold the copyright to all of Wang's original songs without his consent. Wang then became engrossed in a legal battle to fight for his copyright and co-founded his own label Image Music with fellow singer-songwriter and Wonderful Music artist Xu Liang. In June 2014, he released his third album Legendary Movement, which featured strong classical pop elements, as his final project from his alma mater, Shenyang Conservatory of Music.

While awaiting the outcome of the lawsuit for copyright of his songs, Wang turned to appearance on variety shows and soundtrack writing to continue his music career. In June 2015, Wang composed and performed the theme song "Rings of Time" (年轮), also performed by singer Zhang Bichen, for the TV drama The Journey of Flower, starring Wallace Huo and Zhao Liying. On 12 October 2015, Wang released his fourth album "Su-Perfect" (登陆计划). In August 2016, he composed multiple tracks for the soundtrack of the TV drama Love O2O, starring Yang Yang, most notably the theme song "One Alluring Smile" (一笑倾城).

In 2017, he composed the lyrics and music for the song "Soul of the Sword" (剑魂) for the TV drama The Legend of the Condor Heroes (2017 version). On 27 March, he was awarded Best Singer-Songwriter and Top 10 Songs of the Year for "One Alluring Smile" at the 24th Chinese Top Ten Music Awards. On 28 April 2017, Wang released his fifth album, "Live" (莱芙). In March 2018, Wang won Best Singer-Songwriter and Best Concept Album for his album "Live" (莱芙) at the 25th Chinese Top Ten Music Awards. On 14 September 2018, Wang released his sixth album, "Control Monster" (克制凶猛).

In May 2019, he announced his concert tour "Guide to the Galaxy" (银河漫游) with performances in Beijing, Shanghai, and Wuhan. On 6 June, Wang made his film debut with a cameo role in the film My Best Summer starring Arthur Chen, also composing and performing the theme song "The Unforgotten" (耿) for the movie soundtrack. On 17 October, Wang was named to Forbes China's 30 under 30. On 28 October 2019, Wang released his seventh album (and his first cover album), "Recall" (过去现在时).

On 23 January 2020, the song "Deliberately" (偏偏), performed with actress Dilraba Dilmurat for the TV drama Eternal Love of Dream, was released. In September, he joined the Zhejiang TV music variety show Wonderful Time with Li Ronghao, Chen Linong, and Ouyang Nana. On 20 November 2020, Wang released his eighth album, "The Greatest Showman" (大娱乐家).

=== 2021–2024: Career comeback ===
On 14 February 2021, his new song "Season for Love," a collaboration with Australian singer Lenka, was released. On 13 May, it was officially announced that he would join Tencent's large-scale social reality observation show Wonderland. On 16 July, the Shanghai stop of his concert "The Great Showman Live" was officially announced. On 24 July, the prelude to the EP trilogy Encore, titled "Ordinary Love Story,"(普通爱情故事) was released. On 5 August, the "Great Showman Live" concert was canceled due to the COVID-19 pandemic. On 17 November, he won Best Singer-Songwriter and Best Album for The Greatest Showman (大娱乐家) at the 28th Chinese Top Ten Music Awards. On 11 December, he was honored as Most Influential Singer-Songwriter at the 2021 Tencent Music Entertainment Awards.

On 21 July 2022, Wang released his first conceptual creative collection and ninth personal album, Crossover (联名), in which he served as songwriter and producer and invited ten female artists, including Joey Yung, Fiona Sit, and LaLa Hsu, to perform various tracks. On 12 December, his tenth personal album, 21st Century Romance (21世纪罗曼史), was released for online streaming. Its subsequent physical album release ranked first on TME Physical Album Sales Chart's September 2023 chart.

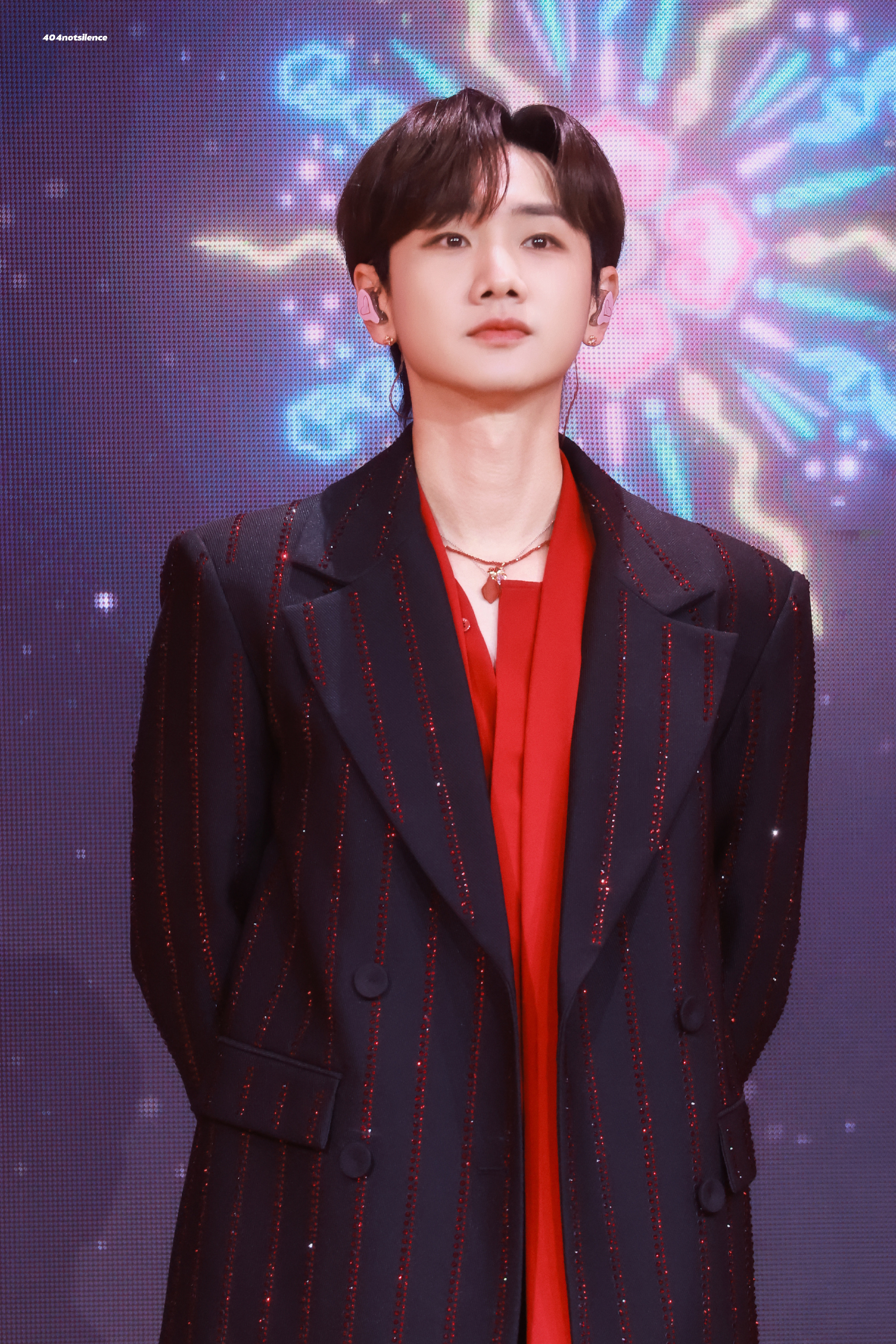
Silence Wang 2024 Coca-Cola event

On 21 January 2023, Wang performed at the 2023 CMG Spring Festival Gala, singing with Alec Su, Chiang Yu-Heng, and Reno Wang, which was rated the most viewed singing performance of the event. On 31 May, he officially announced his concert tour "Party of the Century Live Tour" (世纪派对) with 12 performances in 6 cities (Beijing, Nanjing, Guangzhou, Zhengzhou, Wuhan, and Shanghai), kicking off on 8 July in Beijing and concluding on his birthday, 17 September, in Shanghai. On 19 June, he released the theme song he composed and produced for the TV drama Hidden Love, co-sung with lead actress Zhao Lusi. On 8 July, he won the Best Mainland Producer award at 2024 Tencent Music Entertainment Awards. On 28 August, he won the 30th Chinese Top Ten Music Awards Best Singer-Songwriter and Most Popular Album for his album 21st Century Romance. On 17 December, he received the "Most Popular Singer" award at the 2023 Tencent Video Starlight Awards held in Macau.

On 9 February 2024, Wang appeared for the second time on the CMG Spring Festival Gala, performing with Peking Opera artist Guo Xiao a song that he was commissioned to compose and produce for the show. On 14 February, the song "Hide the Stars" (藏星) was released, which appears on the movie soundtrack of the 2024 hit film YOLO directed by Jia Ling. Another song, "Guess," (猜) performed by singer Curley G, is also part of the movie's soundtrack, with both tracks composed and produced by Silence Wang. On 14 May, Wang announced his first stadium concert tour themed "One Hundred Thousand Volts Live Tour" (十万伏特), coinciding with the release of his eleventh album of the same title. The tour kicked off on 23 June in Wuhan, with stops in Chengdu, Nanjing, Zhengzhou, Shanghai, among others. On 26 August, he won the Most Popular Male Singer and Best Asian Singer-Songwriter awards at the 31st Chinese Top Ten Music Awards. From 30 December to 1 January, Wang held a 3-day exclusive New Year's limited theme concert in Guangzhou, titled "The Great Showman" (大娱乐家), as a tribute to the 2021 concert that was canceled.

=== 2025–Present: Global reach ===
On 28 January, Wang appeared on the CMG Spring Festival Gala for the third consecutive year. On 11 February, he announced his 2025 concert tour "One Hundred Thousand Volts 2.0" (十万伏特2.0) would kick off at the Bird's Nest Stadium in Beijing on 21 March. On 12 February, he appeared on the CCTV Lantern Festival Gala, performing with actress Mao Xiaotong the song "Go See You," (去见你) which he composed for the event. In February, he released a pair of TV drama soundtrack theme songs he composed and produced: "Like Sunday, Like Rain" (像晴天像雨天), the love theme song for the drama The First Frost, starring Bai Jingting and Zhang Ruonan, and "You Are In The World I Like" (你在我喜欢的世界里), title theme song for The Best Thing, starring Zhang Linghe and Xu Ruohan.

Silence Wang 2026 "Rise of Romance" World Tour in Macau

With the overseas popularity of these songs, Wang was recognized by Grammy.com as one of the "12 Artists Helping Mandopop Become The Next Global Genre," as the top mainland China artist streamed on Spotify, averaging more than 2.3 million listeners a month. He was also featured in Harper's Bazaar China's June cover. His New Year's Limited Edition Concert "The Great Showman" received the Platinum Award for international design in the 2025 MUSE Design Awards, while his "One Hundred Thousand Volts 2.0" Concert Tour was awarded Design of the Year in Conceptual Design for Exhibition & Events at the 2025 London Design Awards.

On 18 June, Wang released "Reflection of the Stars" (倒影里的星星), the original theme song he composed and produced for the China region release of the Disney/Pixar animation Elio (film), marking the first time a Chinese artist was commissioned to compose an original song for a Disney/Pixar film. Wang also became the Chinese spokesperson for global brands Coca-Cola (2024-2026) and McDonald's (2026), composing and recording original promotional tracks for each, demonstrating his regional popularity and the ability to blend brand identity with his signature musical style.

In 2026, Wang embarked on two world tours, beginning with "Rise of Romance 2026" (罗曼前传). The tour opened in Macau in February before traveling to major international hubs New York, Seattle (his 100th concert), Melbourne, and Singapore, completing 11 shows across 3 continents in 31 days. On 26 March 2026, he announced his "Age of Romance" (明日世界) world tour, launched in support of the release of his eponymous twelfth studio album.

On 21 August, he announced Crossover 2.0 (联名2), the sequel to his 2022 conceptual creative project Crossover, in which he writes and collaborates on bespoke tracks for ten different female artists. The second installment features prominent artists including Karen Mok and (G)I-DLE member Yuqi (Song Yuqi), who stars in the music video for Wang's track "Ghost Writer" (写故事的人), reflecting his prolific record-producing and songwriting capability to blend custom vocal arrangements tailored to each featured artist's unique style.

== Discography ==
=== Studio albums ===
Title	Album details	Track listing
Dreams Come True (慢慢懂)	Released: 19 November 2010; Formats: CD, digital download, streaming; Label: China Record Corp. Shenzhen	Track Listing: 1. 他的爱; 2. 放不下; 3. 唯你懂我心; 4. 专属味道（feat. 林希儿）; 5. 因为了解; 6. 等不到你; 7. 如果你还不明白; 8. 小星星; 9. 埋葬冬天（feat. 阿悄）; 10. 你让我懂; 11. 幸福是被你需要; 12. 慢慢懂; 13. 放不下 (Remix); 14. 唯你懂我心 (Remix); 15. 专属味道（Remix）; 16. 等不到你 (Remix); 17. 如果你还不明白 (Remix); 18. 小星星 (Remix); 19. 你让我懂 (Remix); 20. 幸福是被你需要 (Remix)
Gravitation (万有引力)	Released: 16 July 2012; Formats: CD, digital download, streaming; Label: Wonderful Music	Track Listing: 1. 有点甜（feat. By2）; 2. 不可思议; 3. 第一首情歌; 4. 不过是想; 5. 那一年; 6. 桃花扇; 7. 分手季节; 8. 风度; 9. 停止跳动
Legendary Movement (传世乐章)	Released: 26 June 2014; Formats: CD, digital download, streaming; Label: Ocean Butterflies Music, Linfair Records	Track Listing: 1. Introduction; 2. 传世乐章; 3. 黑眼圈; 4. 得奖的是; 5. 晴 6. 黑色蝴蝶; 7. Development; 8. 缺点; 9. 吵架歌 (feat. 荷莉); 10. 站台; 11. 谜底; 12. 雾都孤儿; 13. Coda
Su-Perfect (登陆计划)	Released: 12 October 2015; Formats: CD, digital download, streaming; Label: Image Music	Track Listing: 1. 奇怪 Weird Girl; 2. 银河 The Milky Way; 3. 爱怎么会错 Love Can Not Be Wrong; 4. 苏璞 Pu Su; 5. 浪漫曲 Romance; 6. 得不到的温柔 No Tender; 7. 不用紧张 Don't Panic; 8. 茉莉 Jasmine; 9. 地动山摇 Sugar Bomb; 10. 睡前故事 Bedtime Story
Live (莱芙)	Released: 28 April 2017; Formats: CD, digital download, streaming; Label: Image Music	Track Listing: 1. 大好时光 Modern Time; 2. 关于你 About You; 3. 目击者 Witness; 4. 会发光的你 Luminous; 5. 终身伴侣 Soul Mate; 6. 欢乐颂 Song of Joy; 7. 黄昏之时 Twilight; 8. 悖论 Paradox; 9. 不夜城 Swing City; 10. 久病成医 Autism
Control Monster (克制凶猛)	Released: 14 September 2018; Formats: CD, digital download, streaming; Label: Image Music	Track Listing: 1. 黎明降临之前 The Fire Rises; 2. 第十二夜 Like A Butterfly; 3. 盗火 Prometheus; 4. 旷梦 Sisyphus; 5. 坠入 Dive In; 6. 全世界陪我失眠 Lonely Space; 7. 我的星球 Blue Planet; 8. 虚拟恋爱指南 The User Guide of Robot; 9. 岛 Lost Island; 10. 烈火赛道 Race To The Fire
Recall (过去现在时)	Released: 28 October 2019; Formats: CD, digital download, streaming; Label: Image Music	Track Listing: 1. 致曾来过的你; 2. Better Me; 3. 眼泪; 4. 尚好的青春; 5. 我最亲爱的; 6. 原来我们都是爱着的; 7. 蓝色雨; 8. 朋友
The Greatest Showman (大娱乐家)	Released: 20 November 2020; Formats: CD, digital download, streaming; Label: Image Music	Track Listing: 1. 大娱乐家 The Greatest Showman; 2. 讲个笑话 Tell Me A Joke; 3. 娱乐世代 The Entertainment Generation; 4. 小段 Her Story; 5. 末班飞行 The Last Flight; 6. 伊甸园 Before Love Begins; 7. 格林兄弟的诅咒 A Dark Fairy Tale; 8. 每月5号 The 5th of Each Month; 9. 祝我快乐 Monologue; 10. 侏罗纪 Jurassic Party
Crossover Op.1 (联名1)	Released: 15 September 2022; Formats: CD, digital download, streaming; Label: Image Music	Track Listing: 1. 就让这大雨全都落下 Let The Rain Come Down (performed by Joey Yung); 2. 鲸鱼电台 Whale F.M. (performed by 房东的猫); 3. 飞鸟 A Bird (performed by Amber Liu); 4. 海底一公里 One Kilometer Under The Sea (performed by Jingfei); 5. 月亮，月亮 Moon, Moon (performed by Faith Yang); 6. 无效陪伴 Loner's Speaking (performed by 孟慧圆); 7. 不甜情歌 Artificial Sugar (performed by A Si); 8. 星期一先打开星座运势 Dear Delusion (performed by Ouyang Nana); 9. 雨你 Raining In (performed by Fiona Sit); 10. 行走的鱼 Drowned Man (performed by Lala Hsu)
21st Century Romance (21世纪罗曼史)	Released: 28 October 2022; Formats: CD, digital download, streaming; Label: Image Music	Track Listing: 1. 大裂 Huge Crack; 2. 告别前要跳舞 Dance Club; 3. 恋爱动物 Intimate Relationships; 4. 为什么难过一直在重播 Replay Yesterday; 5. 讲话是闭嘴的时候 Silence Is The Language; 6. 软体人生 Mollusca; 7. 全城热恋 Heart Signal; 8. 我没有更多时间 No Time To Live; 9. 一起过夏天 In Summer; 10. 大我年代 The New Century
One Hundred Thousand Volts (十万伏特)	Released: 8 December 2024; Formats: CD, digital download, streaming; Label: Image Music	Track Listing: 1. 短路一刻火花四散 Short Circuit; 2. 十万伏特 One Hundred Thousand Volts; 3. 腾空 Take Off; 4. 想到我们 About Us; 5. 黑梦 Black Dream; 6. 流浪是合理的需求 Sunset's Calling; 7. 闪电 Lightning; 8. 敏感战争 Ego War; 9. 梆梆 Bang Bang; 10. 放·逐 Out of Control; 11. 就不要谈论什么宇宙 Talk About Me
Age of Romance (明日世界)	Released: 14 April 2026 (Act I); Formats: Digital download, streaming; Label: Image Music	Track Listing: 1. 1424; 2. 就要活得不懂艺术 Fake Deep; 3. 一万次热爱; 4. 写故事的人 Ghostwriter; 5. 问你一个人类梦寐以求的深奥问题 My Answer; 6. 世界之巅 The Ascent; 7. 粉旋风 Pink Whirlwind (McDonald's Dessert promotional theme); 8. 疯狂爱人 Overdrive; 9. 让你知道 Now You Know (feat. G.E.M.); 10. 昨晚我环游了世界 Everywhere at Once
Crossover Op.2 (联名2)	Formats: Digital download, streaming; Label: Image Music	Track Listing: 1. 昨天，今天 Yesterday, Today (performed by Karen Mok); 2. 删了一百遍 A Hundred Times (performed by A-Lin); 3. 思念若是一首诗 If Longing Were A Poem (performed by Vinida Weng); 4. 雨终曲 One Last Rain (performed by Yuqi); 5. 芥兰 Off the Menu (performed by Rainie Yang); 6. 在坠落时 At Least I Loved (performed by PuppieBelly); 7. 以我之见 The Way I See (performed by Sitar Tan); 8. 我不想念 I Don't Miss You (performed by Curley Gao); 9. 旅行的天赋 A Gift for Leaving (performed by Accusefive); 10. 多久没有谈天光 Talk Till Daybreak (performed by Miriam Yeung)

=== Extended plays ===
Title	Album details	Track listing
So Quiet (好安静)	Released: 9 September 2011; Formats: Digital download, streaming; Label: Bole Music	Track Listing: 1. 好安靜; 2. 我也不知道; 3. 累不累; 4. 不分手的戀愛; 5. 苦笑; 6. 三國殺; 7. 某人
Encore (安可)	Released: 20 October 2020; Formats: Digital download, streaming; Label: Image Music	Track Listing: 1. 普通愛情故事; 2. 隨便; 3. 還是想念

=== Digital albums ===
Title	Album details	Track listing
First (弗斯特)	Released: 14 May 2010; Formats: Digital download, streaming; Label: Tangyu Culture	Track Listing: 1. 城 2. 等不到你; 3. 多一點時間; 4. 放不下; 5. 間諜; 6. 剪接師; 7. 簡單; 8. 李清照; 9. 你的要求; 10. 年華; 11. 生日快樂; 12. 雙手; 13. 為你唱首歌; 14. 唯你懂我心; 15. 我想了太多; 16. 幸福是被你需要; 17. 掩耳; 18. 英雄; 19. 珍貴; 20. 左手右手
Live at Romance City 2025 - Silence Wang One Hundred Thousand Volts 2.0 Concert (汪苏泷"十万伏特"Live)	Released: 10 February 2026; Formats: Digital download, streaming; Label: Image Music	Track Listing: 1. 末班飞行 - Live; 2. 行走的鱼 - Live; 3. 关于你 - Live; 4. 第一首情歌 - Live; 5. 晴 - Live; 6. 想到我们 - Live; 7. 全世界陪我失眠 - Live; 8. 小星星 - Live; 9. 全城热恋 - Live; 10. 地动山摇 - Live

== Filmography ==
=== Television variety shows ===
Year	English Title	Chinese Title	Network/Platform	Show Genre
2017	Golden Melody (Season 1)	金曲捞	Jiangsu TV	Music
2017	Mask Singer (Season 2)	蒙面唱将猜猜猜 (第二季)	Jiangsu TV	Music
2017	Mars Labs	火星研究院	Youku	Reality
2018	Golden Melody (Season 2)	金曲捞之挑战主打歌	Jiangsu TV	Music
2018	Let's Sing Kids (Season 5)	中国新声代 (第五季)	Hunan TV	Music, talent show
2018	Come Sing With Me (Season 3)	我想和你唱 (第三季)	Hunan TV	Music, reality
2019	I'm CZR (Season 1)	我是唱作人 (第一季)	iQIYI	Music, singing competition
2019	Mr. Housework	做家务的男人	iQIYI	Reality
2019	Wild Kitchen (Season 2)	野生厨房 (第二季)	Mango TV	Reality
2020	New Voices Please Mentor*	新声请指教	Zhejiang TV	Music, talent show
2020	Youth with You (Season 2)	青春有你 (第二季）	iQIYI	Music, talent show
2020	Wonderful Time	美好的時光	Zhejiang TV	Music, reality
2020	Little Giant Games	小巨人运动会	Mango TV	Reality
2021	Crystal Girls: Nanxun	水晶晶南浔 水晶晶女孩	Xigua, Douyin	Talent show
2021	Be With You (Season 1)	我的小尾巴 (第一季)	iQIYI	Reality
2021	Youth with You (Season 3)	青春有你 (第三季）	iQIYI	Music, talent show
2021	Wonderland / 50km Taohuawu (Season 1)	五十公里桃花坞 (第一季)	Tencent/WeTV	Reality
2021	Singing with Legends / Our Song (Season 3)	我们的歌 (第三季)	Dragon TV	Music, singing competition
2021	Youth Periplous (Season 3)	青春环游记 (第三季)	Zhejiang TV	Reality
2021	Be With You (Season 2)	我的小尾巴 (第二季)	iQIYI	Reality
2021	Happiness Assemble!*	集合！开心果	Dragon TV	Talk show
2022	Wonderland / 50km Taohuawu (Season 2)	五十公里桃花坞 (第二季)	Tencent/WeTV	Reality
2022	Sound Like Summer Flowers	声声如夏花	Kuaishou, Migu	Music, talent show
2022	Heart Signal (Season 5)	心动的信号 (第五季)	Tencent/WeTV	Reality
2023	The Treasured Voice (Season 4)	天赐的声音 (第四季)	Zhejiang TV	Music, singing competition
2023	Wonderland / 50km Taohuawu (Season 3)	五十公里桃花坞 (第三季)	Tencent/WeTV	Reality
2023	Circle of Sound / Infinity and Beyond (Season 3)	声生不息·家年华	Hunan TV, Mango TV	Music, singing competition
2024	The Treasured Voice (Season 5)	天赐的声音 (第五季)	Zhejiang TV	Music, singing competition
2024	Singer 2024 (Season 9)	歌手2024	Hunan TV, Mango TV	Music, singing competition
2024	Wonderland / 50km Taohuawu (Season 4)	五十公里桃花坞 (第四季)	Tencent/WeTV	Reality
2024	Hit Song 2024	有歌2024	Zhejiang TV	Music, singing competition
2024	Bravo 650!	团建不能停	Tencent/WeTV	Reality
2025	Circle of Sound / Infinity and Beyond (Season 5)	声生不息·华流季	Hunan TV, Mango TV	Music, singing competition

*Unofficial English titles.

=== Film ===
Year	English title	Chinese title	Role
2019	My Best Summer	最好的我们	The Freak (as Silence)

== Tours ==
- Guide to the Galaxy Tour「银河漫游」巡回演唱会 (2019)
- Party of the Century Live Tour「世纪派对」巡回演唱会 (July - September 2023)
- One Hundred Thousand Volts Concert Tour「十万伏特」巡回演唱会 (June - December 2024)
- One Hundred Thousand Volts 2.0 Concert Tour「万伏特2.0」巡回演唱会 (March 2025 - January 2026)
- Rise of Romance World Tour 2026「罗曼前传」世界巡回演唱会 (February - March 2026)
- Age of Romance World Tour 2026「明日世界」世界巡回演唱会 (May 2026 - ongoing)
