= The Best Thing (TV series) =

2025 Chinese television series

- Promotional poster
- Also known as: For Love
- Simplified Chinese: 爱你
- Genre: Romance; Slice of life
- Based on: Loving You, Is the Best Thing I'll Ever Do by Sheng Li
- Written by: Shen Fei Xian; Ou Si Jia
- Directed by: Che Liangyi
- Starring: Zhang Linghe; Xu Ruohan
- Country of origin: China
- Original language: Mandarin
- No. of seasons: 1
- No. of episodes: 28

Production
- Production locations: Hangzhou, Nanjing, China
- Running time: 45 minutes
- Production company: iQIYI

Original release
- Network: IQIYI
- Release: 25 February – 13 March 2025

The Best Thing (Chinese: 爱你) is a 2025 Chinese romantic television series starring Zhang Linghe and Xu Ruohan. The plot is adapted from the Chinese Web novel (Chinese: 爱你，是我做过最好的事, lit. 'Loving You, Is the Best Thing I'll Ever Do') by Sheng Li. On 25 February 2025, it was released on iQIYI. It tells the story of a doctor and a woman with chronic insomnia, and the healing bond that unfolds between them.

== Synopsis ==
Shen Xifan (Xu Ruohan), a hotel housekeeping manager, experiences insomnia and migraines following the end of a difficult relationship. At her family's suggestion, she visits a nearby traditional Chinese medicine clinic, where she meets He Suye (Zhang Linghe), the doctor assigned to her care. Their relationship begins on professional terms but gradually deepens as they discover they live in the same neighborhood and frequently cross paths. Both having been hurt by past relationships, they slowly learn to open their hearts again. He Suye's dedication to traditional Chinese medicine and his commitment to his career inspire Shen Xifan to pursue her own aspirations. Through shared experiences and mutual understanding, they find healing and develop a sincere and enduring love.

== Cast ==
=== Main cast ===
Cast	Role	Notes
Zhang Linghe	He Suye	Chief Physician of Oncology Department of Traditional Chinese Medicine Hospital. He hails from a medical family.
Xu Ruohan	Shen Xifan	Housekeeping Manager at Gunan Huating Hotel. She endures severe insomnia following a failed relationship.

=== Supporting cast ===
Cast	Role	Notes
Wang Youjun	Lin Yishen	Shen Xifan's close friend, the Marketing Manager at Gunan Huating Hotel, has secretly loved Xu Xiangya since their university days. He never confessed his feelings, fearing it would ruin their friendship.
Tang Jiuzhou	Li Jie	He Suye's junior apprentice, an intern doctor in the oncology department at Jiangzhou University of Traditional Chinese Medicine Affiliated Hospital.
Huang Cancan	Xu Xiangya	Shen Xifan's best friend and Lin Yishen's lover, Food and Beverage Manager at Gunan Huating Hotel.
Zhou Yiru	Fang Kexin	He Suye's junior apprentice and student of He Suye's maternal grandfather. An intern doctor in the gynecology department at Jiangzhou University of Traditional Chinese Medicine Affiliated Hospital.
Caesar Wu	Yan Heng	Shen Xifan's ex-boyfriend, who subjects his partner to psychological PUA-style manipulation and dated for seven years.
Li Jianyi	You Liren	He Suye's grandfather; a renowned traditional Chinese medicine doctor in Hangzhou.
Fang Zibin	Shen Jiaping	A high-school English teacher and Shen Xifan's father. He tends to speak English when he drinks and is open-minded in his thinking.
Liu Weiwei	Liu Xiaoming	Shen Jiaping's wife and Shen Xifan's mother. Together with her husband, she forms a harmonious and happy family. She and her husband are a humorous pair of parents who care deeply about their daughter's marriage and frequently take an active role in her life in positive ways.
Guo Jinglin	He Sheng	He Suye's father and a well-known cardiovascular surgery specialist. He holds a high status and strong influence in the field of cardiac surgery and frequently participates in major medical exchange events. However, his family relationships are rather complicated.
Wang Ziming	Zhao Ze	He Suye's young patient.
Wu Yue	Mr. Ding	General Manager of Gunan Huating Hotel.
Zhang Yuning	Ding Wei	A former front-desk receptionist in the Front Office Department at Gunan Huating Hotel.
Zhang Lu	Liu Yunci	Elderly guest at the tourist's hotel. She is also known as Granny Liu.
Zhang Zimeng	Sun Jialing	Also known as "Little Sun", a nurse at the Hong'anmen Traditional Chinese Medicine Clinic.
Osborn Ma	Song Feng	He Suye's senior fellow disciple and an oncologist at the Affiliated Hospital of Jiangzhou University of Traditional Chinese Medicine.
Zhao Kaiyi	Yu Nianxiang	He Suye's mother and He Sheng's wife. Born into a family of traditional Chinese medicine practitioners, but she died from breast cancer and loved tulips most of all.
Jia Yumeng	Nurse Wang	
Duanmu Yi Chen	Zhou Caifeng	
Chen Yuqian	Liu Pingping	
Jia Shuyi	Wu Ping	

=== Guest appearances ===
Cast	Role	Notes
Bi Wenjun	Self	Famous celebrity.
Xie Xinhao	Gu Ping	
Tan Yang	—	Yan Heng's father and chairman of Zhongyu Technology. He opposes his younger son's relationship with Shen Xifan, believing she is not worthy of their family.
Olive	Sun Jiajing	Nurse.
Luo Zi Shuo	He Suye (Young)	
Ning Zi	—	Patient's family.

== Soundtrack ==
The soundtrack for The Best Thing features various artists including Silence Wang and Mika Hashizume. The original soundtrack (OST) was released digitally across various platforms.

The Best Thing Original Soundtrack
No.	Title	Lyrics	Music	Artist	Length
1.	"You Are in the World I Like" (Theme song)			Silence Wang	3:42
2.	"The Best Time"	Lin Qiao, Wu Shang	Tojimura	Fu Yaning & Du Zhiwen	3:16
3.	"Loving You"	Ray Hou, Zhang Xiaolu, Yang Shangyi	Ray Hou	Mika	3:01
4.	"The Best Thing"	Cui Shixuan	Hou Zhijian	Sa Ji	4:14
5.	"White Lover"	Yang Xinzhi, Yuan Tianye	Motif of Magic Flute, Water Dragon	Cao Yang (singer)	4:15
6.	"My Love for You"	Xu Sisi	Zeng Di	Yan Renzhong	4:12
7.	"Agarwood"	Xu Sisi	Zeng Di	Bo Yuan	3:52
8.	"Two Little Hearts"		Ray Hou	Ray Hou	3:28
9.	"We Found Each Other"		Ray Hou	Wu Jiaqi	3:28
10.	"Fate"	Ray Hou	Gao Yiqian, Ray Hou	Lauren Woo	3:22
Total length:					36:50

== Production ==
On 21 March 2024, the filming for the series began, and it concluded on 5 July 2024. Zhang Linghe studied traditional Chinese medicine in preparation for his role in the drama.

== Awards and nominations ==
Year	Award	Category	Work	Result	Ref.
2025	30th Busan International Film Festival (Asian Content & Global OTT Awards)	Best Newcomer Actress	Xu Ruohan	Nominated	
