= Intersection (group) =

Japanese boy band

- Origin: Tokyo, Japan
- Genres: J-pop; R&B
- Years active: 2018–2022
- Label: Avex
- Members: Mika Hashizume; William Aoyama; Kazuma Mitchell; Caelan Moriarty
- Website: www.intersection-tokyo.jp

Intersection (stylized INTERSECTION) was a Japanese boy band formed by Avex in 2018. They disbanded on March 31, 2022.

== History ==
Avex created Intersection's concept in 2015 after scouting the members, forming the group on the basis of the group's members having mixed ancestry in an attempt to break into the international music market. Prior to debuting, Kazuma Mitchell was an exclusive model for Men's Non-no and a student at Harvard University, while William Aoyama was a Junior Olympic swimmer.

In October 2018, they released their digital debut single, "Heart of Gold", followed by "Falling" in November 2018, "Body Language" in December 2018, and "You're the Reason" in July 2019. In July 2019, Intersection was announced as the performer of the ending theme song to the 2019 anime adaptation of Fruits Basket with the song "One Step Closer." Later, on August 21, 2019, they released their first album, Intersection, digitally, with the song "You're the Reason" as the promotional track. In January 2020, they were announced as the performers of the ending theme song to the third season of Black Clover with the song "New Page."

In 2021, Kazuma, Caelan, and Mika participated in the Chinese reality survival program Produce Camp 2021. While Kazuma left the show and Caelan was eliminated in the final episode, Mika placed 4th in the competition; he subsequently debuted in the Chinese boy band Into1. On March 31, 2022, Intersection disbanded.

== Members ==
- Mika Hashizume (橋爪ミカ)
- William Aoyama (青山ウィリアム)
- Kazuma Mitchell (ミッチェル和馬)
- Caelan Moriarty (モリアティー慶怜)

== Discography ==
=== Albums ===
Title	Year	Details	Peak chart positions	Sales
Title	Year	Details	JPN	Sales
Intersection	2019	Released: August 21, 2019; Label: Avex Entertainment; Format: digital download	—	—

=== Singles ===
Title	Year	Peak chart positions		Sales	Album
Title	Year	JPN	JPN Hot	Sales	Album
"Heart of Gold"	2018	—	—	—	Intersection
"Falling"	2018	—	—	—	Intersection
"Body Language"	2018	—	—	—	Intersection
"One Step Closer"	2019	—	—	—	Intersection
"You're the Reason"	2019	—	—	—	Intersection
"—" denotes releases that did not chart or were not released in that region.
