= Inoherb =

Chinese Skincare Brand

- Industry: Personal care
- Founded: 2000
- Headquarters: Shanghai, China
- Area served: China
- Products: Cosmetics and beauty products
- Website: www.inoherb.com

Inoherb is a Chinese skincare brand which originated from Shanghai, China and was conceived by a traditional Chinese medicine doctor who was deeply influenced by Chinese medicine since her childhood. The brand targets young consumers with herbal skin care products which including whitening, moisturizing, oil control, sunscreen, men and many other categories.

The brand cooperated with the School of Basic Medicine of Shanghai University of Traditional Chinese Medicine for the production of the product lines in all aspects including the product composition, technical process, production process and quality inspection. The brand also cooperated with the Shanghai University of Chinese Medicine Teaching and Testing Center to set up a beauty experiment base and an R & D center.

Inoherb is considered to be among the much affordable skincare brands in China and its biggest competitors are L'oreal Paris and Pechoin. The brand is given a double A (AA) status and a double B (BB) in resourcefulness.

== Marketing ==
The brand employed a number of Chinese celebrities as ambassadors for promotional purposes which includes Zhou Dongyu, Alan Dawa Dolma, Cecilia Liu and Ma Sichun. The brand is sold on e-commerce sites in China which includes, Taobao and Tmall.

== Ingredients ==
Many of the ingredients of the skincare line contains traditional Chinese herbs and fruits for example, Astragalus membranaceus (Fisch.) Bunge., Ginkgo biloba L., Glycyrrhiza uralensis Fisch., Ligusticum chuanxiong hort, Angelica sinensis, Sea buckthorns, papaya, chrysanthemum flower, Lonicera japonica and more.

== Sponsorship ==
The brand was the sponsor for the second season of the Chinese variety show, Go Fighting! The brand contributed about 50 million yuan and sales on Tmall shot up to 800 units per month after broadcast of the second season. The brand also contributed sponsorship to another Chinese variety show aired on the Chinese government owned broadcasting channel, CCTV-1 (舞出我人生). The sum of funds contributed to the Chinese variety show was about a hundred million yuan.

== See also ==
- Balmshell
