= List of Zhou Shen concert tours =

Zhou Shen concert tours
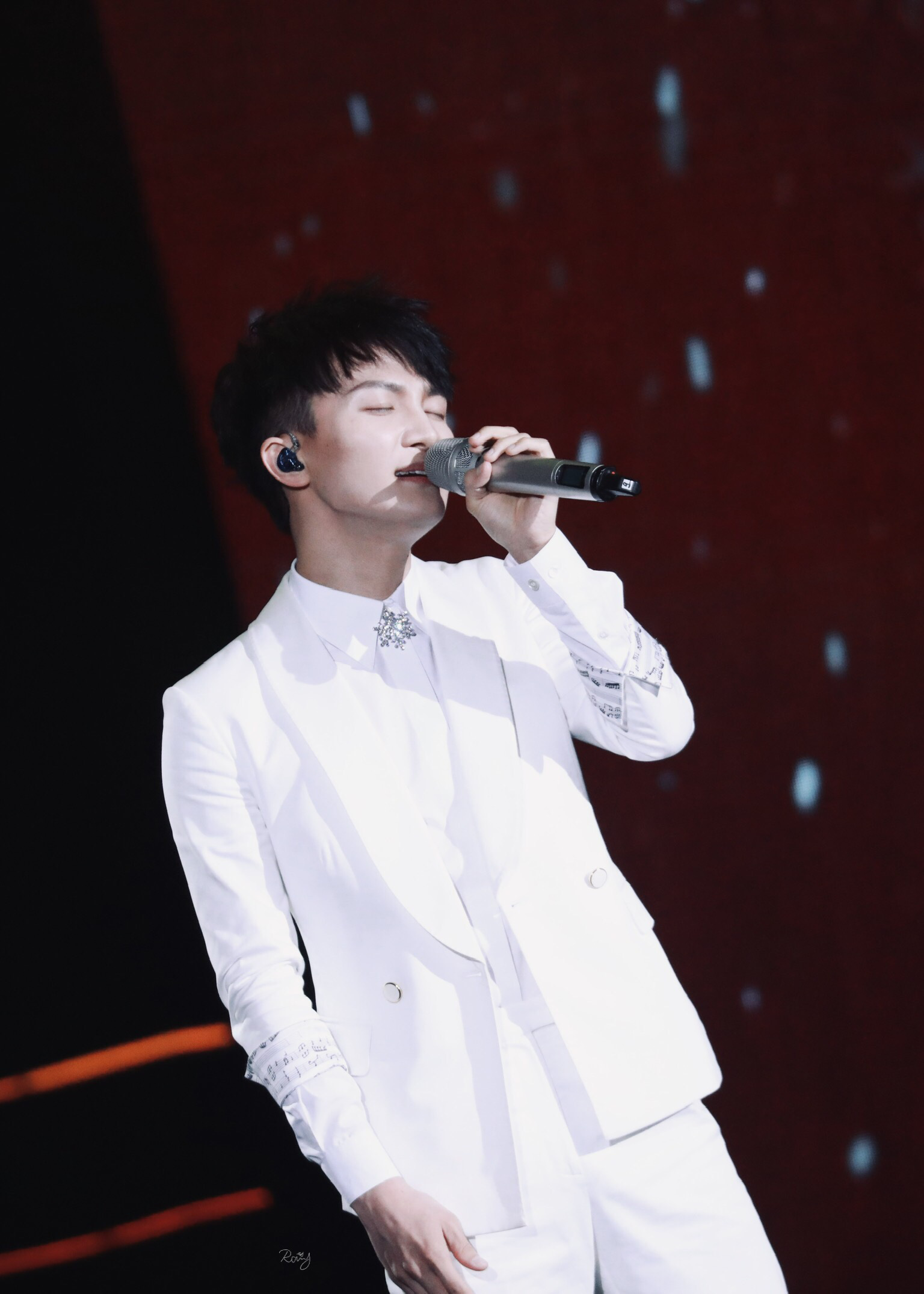
- Zhou in 2019
- Concert tours: 3
- One-off concerts: 4

This is a list of concerts and tours by Chinese singer Zhou Shen.

== Concert tours ==
Title	Date(s)	Associated work(s)	Location	Shows	Attendance
Deep Space Tour	May 19, 2018 – July 7, 2019	Flowers Blooming	China	6	—
C-929 Planet Tour	November 9, 2019 – January 4, 2020	The Doomsday Spacecraft	China	7	—
9.29Hz World Concert Tour	May 18, 2024 – April 12, 2025	Shenself	Asia; North America; Oceania	28	—
Shen Shen's World Tour	May 18, 2025 –	Shen's Love (小深情）	Asia; China; Oceania		—
—

== One-off concerts ==
Title	Date(s)	Location
Shen's Moment Sharing Concert	March 28, 2019	Beijing
"Good Night, See You Tomorrow" Online Concert	July 25, 2020	Online
"I Want to Be by Your Side" Online Concert	August 6, 2022	Online
"Thank You Deeply" 9th Anniversary Concert	August 19, 2023	Cadillac Arena, Beijing

== Deep Space Tour ==
List of concert dates
Date	City	Country	Venue	Ref.
May 19, 2018	Shanghai	China	Bandai Namco Shanghai Base	
May 29, 2018	Wuhan	China	Wanda Han Show Theater	
June 16, 2018	Chengdu	China	Chengdu Zhenghuo Art Center	
January 20, 2019	Beijing	China		
June 22, 2019	Shenzhen	China		
July 7, 2019	Hangzhou	China	Hangzhou Theater	

== C-929 Planet Tour ==
List of concert dates
Date	City	Country	Venue
November 9, 2019	Beijing	China	Workers' Stadium
November 16, 2019	Nanjing	China	Jiangsu Grand Theatre
November 30, 2019	Shenzhen	China	Shenzhen Stadium
December 7, 2019	Suzhou	China	Suzhou Sports Center Gymnasium
December 14, 2019	Chengdu	China	Huaxi Live 528 Space
December 21, 2019	Shanghai	China	Jing'an Sports Center
January 4, 2020	Guangzhou	China	Sun Yat-sen Memorial Hall

== 9.29Hz World Concert Tour ==
List of concert dates
Date	City	Country	Venue	Attendance
May 18, 2024	Shanghai	China	Mercedes-Benz Arena	—
May 19, 2024	Shanghai	China	Mercedes-Benz Arena	—
June 1, 2024	Shenzhen	China	Shenzhen Universiade Sports Center Stadium	—
June 15, 2024	Chengdu	China	Dong'an Lake Sports Park Stadium	—
July 13, 2024	Guiyang	China	Guiyang Olympic Sports Center Stadium	44,000
July 27, 2024	Wuhan	China	Wuhan Sports Center Stadium	35,000
August 10, 2024	Nanjing	China	Nanjing Olympic Sports Center Stadium	70,000
August 11, 2024	Nanjing	China	Nanjing Olympic Sports Center Stadium	70,000
August 23, 2024	Hangzhou	China	Hangzhou Olympic Sports Center Stadium	100,000
August 24, 2024	Hangzhou	China	Hangzhou Olympic Sports Center Stadium	100,000
September 7, 2024	Shenyang	China	Shenyang Olympic Sports Centre Stadium	36,000
September 21, 2024	Beijing	China	Beijing National Stadium	120,000
September 22, 2024	Beijing	China	Beijing National Stadium	120,000
October 6, 2024	Chongqing	China	Chongqing Olympic Sports Center Stadium	70,000
October 7, 2024	Chongqing	China	Chongqing Olympic Sports Center Stadium	70,000
November 9, 2024	Suzhou	China	Suzhou Sports Center Stadium	—
November 10, 2024	Suzhou	China	Suzhou Sports Center Stadium	—
November 23, 2024	Nanchang	China	Nanchang International Sports Center Stadium	40,000
December 6, 2024	Nanning	China	Guangxi Sports Center Main Stadium	—
December 7, 2024	Nanning	China	Guangxi Sports Center Main Stadium	—
February 28, 2025	Las Vegas	United States	Dolby Live	10,586
March 1, 2025	Las Vegas	United States	Dolby Live	10,586
March 5, 2025	Everett	United States	Angel of the Winds Arena	7,362
March 9, 2025	New York City	United States	Barclays Center	12,546
March 14, 2025	Toronto	Canada	Coca-Cola Coliseum	—
March 15, 2025	Toronto	Canada	Coca-Cola Coliseum	—
March 29, 2025	Melbourne	Australia	Rod Laver Arena	—
April 6, 2025	Sydney	Australia	International Convention Centre Sydney	—
April 12, 2025	Kuala Lumpur	Malaysia	Axiata Arena	—
April 13, 2025	Kuala Lumpur	Malaysia	Axiata Arena	—
Total				N/A

== Shen Shen's World Tour (深深的) ==
Date	City	Country	Venue	Attendance
May 17–18, 2025	Shanghai	China	Shanghai Stadium	~100,000
May 31 – June 1, 2025	Nanjing	China	Nanjing Olympic Sports Center Stadium	~90,000
June 14–15, 2025	Taiyuan	China	Shanxi Sport Center Stadium	~88,000
June 28–29, 2025	Qingdao	China	Qingdao Citizens' Fitness Center Stadium	~85,000
July 26–27, 2025	Xi'an	China	Xi'an Olympic Sports Center Stadium	~80–90k
August 9–10, 2025	Harbin	China	Harbin International Convention & Exhibition Center Stadium	~90,000
August 29–30, 2025	Guiyang	China	Guiyang Olympic Sports Center Stadium	~90,000
September 13–14, 2025	Hangzhou	China	Hangzhou Olympic Sports Center Stadium	~96,000
October 6–7, 2025	Tianjin	China	Tianjin Olympic Center Stadium	—
October 18–19, 2025	Fuzhou	China	Fuzhou Strait Olympic Sports Center Stadium	~86,000
November 1–2, 2025	Chengdu	China	Dong'an Lake Sports Park Main Stadium	—
November 15–16, 2025	Hefei	China	Hefei Sports Center Main Stadium	—
December 6–7, 2025	Shenzhen	China	Shenzhen Universiade Center Stadium	—
December 31, 2025	Hong Kong	China	Kai Tak Sports Park Main Stadium	81,765
January 1, 2026	Hong Kong	China	Kai Tak Sports Park Main Stadium	81,765
Apri 18–19, 2026	Guangzhou	China	Guangdong Olympic Sports Center Stadium	—
May 2–3, 2026	Wuhan	China	Wuhan Sports Center Stadium	—
May 16–17, 2026	Suzhou	China	Suzhou Sports Center Stadium	—
May 30–31, 2026	Chongqing	China	Chongqing Olympic Sports Center Stadium	—
June 27–28, 2026	Zhengzhou	China	Zhengzhou Olympic Sports Center Stadium	—
July 11–12, 2026	Hohhot	China	Hohhot Stadium	—
July 25–26, 2026	Shenyang	China	Shenyang Olympic Sports Centre Stadium	—
August 8–9, 2026	Guiyang	China	Guiyang Olympic Sports Center Stadium	—
August 22–23, 2026	Jinan	China	Jinan Olympic Sports Center Stadium	—
September 12–13, 2026	Taizhou	China	Taizhou Sports Center Stadium	—
September 25–27, 2026	Beijing	China	Beijing National Stadium	—
October 17–18, 2026	Changsha	China	Changsha Helong Sports Center Stadium	—
November 7–8, 2026	Changzhou	China	Changzhou Olympic Sports Center Stadium	—
November 21–22, 2026	Xiamen	China	Egret Stadium	—
December 5–6, 2026	Foshan	China	Foshan Century Lotus Sports Center Stadium	—
December 31, 2026	Nanning	China	Guangxi Sports Center Main Stadium	—
January 1, 2027	Nanning	China	Guangxi Sports Center Main Stadium	—
