= Balmshell =

Cosmetic Line Developed By Identical Twins

- Product type: Cosmetics
- Current owner: Jennifer and Fiona Lees
- Country: Canada
- Introduced: 2006

Balmshell is a cosmetic line developed by Canadian identical twin sisters Jennifer and Fiona Lees.

== Description ==
Balmshell products were launched in Holt Renfrew stores in Canada in 2006.

The brand now includes lip gloss and the Smear Campaign products.

The line is sold at Shoppers Drug Mart, and usually associated with "BROS". Murale, and London Drugs stores across Canada.
