= Zhang Linghe =

Chinese actor (born 1997)

- Zhang in The Best Thing in 2025
- Born: Zhang Jiawei (张家玮); December 30, 1997 (age 28); Wuxi, Jiangsu, China
- Education: Nanjing Normal University
- Occupations: Actor; model
- Years active: 2020–present
- Agent: Star Times
- Height: 190 cm (6 ft 3 in)

Chinese name
- Traditional Chinese: 張凌赫
- Simplified Chinese: 张凌赫
Transcriptions
Standard Mandarin
- Hanyu Pinyin: Zhāng Línghè

Zhang Linghe (Chinese: 张凌赫; pinyin: Zhāng Línghè; born 30 December 1997) is a Chinese actor and model. He is known for his roles in Love Between Fairy and Devil (2022), My Journey to You (2023), Story of Kunning Palace (2023), The Princess Royal (2024), The Best Thing (2025), Pursuit of Jade (2026), and Overdo (2026).

== Early life ==
Zhang Linghe was born Zhang Jiawei on 30 December 1997 in Wuxi, Jiangsu, China. He studied at Jiangsu Tianyi High School. In 2016, he was admitted to Nanjing Normal University where he majored in electrical engineering. Due to an interest in physics, he joined the Aerospace Society.

== Career ==
Zhang made his television debut in the costume romance drama Maiden Holmes and also starred in the youth romance drama Sparkle Love. The following year, he appeared in the urban romance drama Love Crossed and the youth school drama Flourish in Time.

He began to achieve wider recognition in 2022 after portraying Chang Heng, the god of war in the costume fairy tale drama Love Between Fairy and Devil, which gained him recognition. Zhang achieved breakout success after starring as Gong Ziyu in the historical drama My Journey to You and Xie Wei in costume romance drama Story of Kunning Palace. In 2025, Zhang starred as He Suye, a traditional Chinese medicine doctor in modern romance drama The Best Thing. Later that summer, Zhang starred as Jiang Qiaoxi in youth romance drama Our Generation.

In March 2026, Zhang was launched into international stardom after starring as the lead Xie Zheng in historical drama Pursuit of Jade. The series recorded heat indexes exceeding 31,000 on Tencent and 10,000 on iQIYI within one week of its broadcast, and debuted at number six on Netflix's Global Top 10 Non-English Shows chart. Media outlets and viewers praised his performance as a disguised marquis.

During a promotional appearance for the drama on Chinese variety show Hello Saturday, Zhang and Tian drew portraits of each other. Zhang joked that Tian's stylized drawing of him looked as if the person depicted had been "born in Southeast Asia," and also compared it to Chinese comedian Yang Di. Clips of the segment circulated online, drawing criticism from Southeast Asian viewers who interpreted the remark as stereotypical. Zhang later issued an apology in both Chinese and English, stating that he did not intend to offend anyone and expressed appreciation for fans in Southeast Asia.

After the success of Pursuit of Jade, Zhang was invited by the Chinese government's Taiwan Affairs Office to speak at the annual Straits Forum. The forum is hosted in Xiamen, China to promote cross-strait exchange between China and Taiwan. Approximately 6000 people, ranging from students to businesspeople, attended the forum. The first Chinese actor to be invited to speak at the event, Zhang encouraged Taiwanese people to visit the mainland China. He supported the increased exchange of creative works, arts, and film between the two peoples, stating that, "the power of culture can always transcend mountains and seas, connecting the hearts of compatriots on both sides of the strait." Among the public in Taiwan, there was a mixed reaction to Zhang's speech. While some appreciated the desire for peaceful exchange, others saw the speech as Chinese Communist Party propaganda for the reunification of China and Taiwan. On Threads, one commenter stated that, "I really like him, but I still have a clear head."

Zhang was nominated for his work in Pursuit of Jade in the Seoul Drama Awards for Best Actor. He was the only male Chinese actor nominated in the category (352 submissions internationally).

== Other ventures ==
=== Endorsements ===
Since 2023, Zhang has been an ambassador for French beauty brand Lancôme.

In April 2024, Zhang was promoted to brand ambassador for Swiss luxury watch and jewellery brand Chopard. In May 2024, he was named house ambassador for French luxury shoe brand Roger Vivier. In July, Zhang was named brand ambassador for Italian luxury fashion house Gucci.

The following year, it was announced Zhang would also be representing Gucci Beauty as brand ambassador. American denim brand Lee appointed Zhang in June 2025 as their first-ever brand ambassador for the Asia-Pacific region.

In January 2026, Zhang was announced as the brand ambassador for Italian luxury jewelry house Bulgari.

Zhang is the global brand ambassador for herbal tea brand Wang Laoji, and Chinese cosmetics brand Carslan. He is also the China brand spokesperson for Lenovo, Motorola, CeraVe, Puma, Belle, Vatti, Inoherb, and Dreame.

=== Philanthropy ===
Zhang donated funds to the Han Hong Charity Foundation to support victims of the 2025 Tibet earthquake. Later that November, he donated funds to the Han Hong Charity Foundation to aid those affected by the Wang Fuk Court fire in Hong Kong.

In April 2026, Zhang was appointed ambassador for WildAid and starred in their documentary series The Answer is Earth, a co-production with Warner Bros. Discovery exploring China's low-carbon transition and green practices, with support from China's Ministry of Ecology and Environment.

== Filmography ==
=== Television series ===
Year	English title	Chinese title	Role	Network	Notes	Ref.
2020	Maiden Holmes	少女大人	Pei Zhao / Prince Qi	Tencent	Main role	
2020	Sparkle Love	心动的瞬间	Mai Sichong	Mango TV	Main role	
2021	Love Crossed	完美的他	Xu Nian / Xu Jin	iQIYI, Tencent	Main role	
2021	Flourish in Time	我和我的时光少年	Jiang Haoyue	Tencent	Main role	
2021	Refinement of Faith	百炼成钢	Guang Weiran	Mango TV	Supporting role	
2022	Love Between Fairy and Devil	苍兰诀	Chang Heng / Xiao Run	iQIYI	Supporting role	
2023	My Journey to You	云之羽	Gong Ziyu	iQIYI	Lead role	
2023	Bright Eyes in the Dark	他从火光中走来	Lin Qi	iQIYI	Cameo	
2023	Tiger and Crane	虎鹤妖师录	Qi Xiaoxuan	iQIYI	Lead role	
2023	Story of Kunning Palace	宁安如梦	Xie Wei / Xie Juan	iQIYI	Lead role	
2024	Fox Spirit Matchmaker: Red-Moon Pact	狐妖小红娘月红篇	Hu Weisheng	iQIYI	Supporting role	
2024	The Princess Royal	度华年	Pei Wenxuan	Youku	Lead role	
2024	Love's Rebellion	四海重明	Ji Yang	iQIYI, Mango TV	Lead role	
2025	The Best Thing	爱你	He Suye	iQIYI	Lead role	
2025	Our Generation	樱桃琥珀	Jiang Qiaoxi	Youku	Lead role	
2026	Pursuit of Jade	逐玉	Xie Zheng / Yan Zheng	iQIYI, Tencent	Lead role	
2026	Overdo	这一秒过火	Murong Qingyi	iQIYI, Tencent	Lead role	
TBA	Eternal Faith	吉星高照	Hua Cheng / San Lang	iQIYI	Lead role	
TBA	The Road to Glory	归鸾	Xiao Li	Tencent	Lead role	
TBA	Revenge	刺棠	Ye Tingyan / Ye He	Tencent	Lead role	

=== Variety show ===
Year	English title	Chinese title	Role	Network	Ref.
2023	Back to Field Season 7	向往的生活（第七季）	Guest	Mango TV	
2023	As You Wish: Story of Kunning Palace	100万个约定之宁安如梦	Cast member	iQIYI	
2024	The Truth Season 2	开始推理吧（第二季）	Cast member	Tencent	
2025	The Truth Season 3	开始推理吧（第三季）	Cast member	Tencent	
2025	Back to Field Season 8	向往的生活（第八季）	Guest	Mango TV	
2026	Our Dormitories: Back to Heart	我们的宿舍·归心季	Guest	Mango TV	
2026	The Truth Season 4	开始推理吧（第四季）	Cast member	Tencent	
