= Story of Kunning Palace =

2023 Chinese television series

- Promotional poster
- Genre: Historical; Romance
- Based on: A Lady's Tranquility by Shi Jing
- Directed by: Chu Yui-Pan
- Starring: Bai Lu; Zhang Linghe
- Opening theme: "With Love" (与爱) by Jane Zhang
- Ending theme: "Lending Dream" (借梦) by Zhou Shen
- Country of origin: China
- Original language: Mandarin
- No. of seasons: 1
- No. of episodes: 38

Production
- Production location: Hengdian World Studios
- Running time: 45 minutes
- Production company: iQIYI

Original release
- Release: November 7 – November 25, 2023

Story of Kunning Palace (Chinese: 宁安如梦; pinyin: Níng ān rú mèng), is a 2023 Chinese television series starring Bai Lu and Zhang Linghe. It is based on the romance web novel A Lady's Tranquility by Shi Jing. The series aired on iQIYI from November 7, 2023 to November 25, 2023.

== Synopsis ==
In her previous life, Jiang Xuening was an ambitious woman who wanted to have the highest power and authority. However, she was forced to commit suicide after her husband, King Shen Jie was poisoned by the rebels. After rebirth, she got another opportunity to change her fate by not entering the palace. However, due to a mistake, she becomes a student of the crown prince junior preceptor, Xie Wei, who started a coup and was responsible for her down fall in her previous life.

== Cast and characters ==
=== Main ===
- Bai Lu as Jiang Xuening / Jiang Ning
  - Jiang Xuening: Second daughter of the Jiang family. In her previous life, she married Shen Jie and became the empress of Qian. However, after the rebellion she committed suicide and returned back to the past.
  - Jiang Ning: The author of Story of Kunning Palace. After writing the original ending of the story she was dissatisfied with it. As a result, she decided to rewrite the fate of Jiang Xuening by sending her back to the past with the memories of her previous life.
- Zhang Linghe as Xie Wei / Xie Ju'an

Crown prince junior preceptor. In Xuening's previous life, he led the rebellion against Emperor Shen Jie along with Yan Lin.

- Wang Xingyue as Zhang Zhe

A civil servant who used to work for Chen Ying, the minister of the Ministry of Justice.

- Zhou Junwei as Yan Lin

Heir of Yan family. In Xuening's previous life, his whole family was killed during his coming of age ceremony. He later joined forces with Xie Wei to rebel against the Emperor Shen Jie.

=== Supporting ===
Royal family

- Liu Xiening as Shen Zhiyi

Princess of Qian and younger sister of the Emperor. In previous life, she fell in love with Jiang Xuening after mistaking her as a man. After she got to that know that Xuening was a woman, she started to make things difficult for her in the palace. In current life, she is on good terms with Xuening and considers her as a good friend.

- Zhou Dawei as Shen Jie

Younger brother of the Emperor. In Xuening's previous life, he inherited the throne after his older brother's death and married Jiang Xuening. In current life, he falls in love with Jiang Xuehui. However, due to the pressure from Emperor and Empress Dowager Xue, he had to take in Jiang Xuehui as his concubine and Fang Miao as his consort.

- Liu Min as Empress Dowager Xue

Mother of the Emperor and sister of Xue Yuan.

- Ye Xiyue as Xue Shu

Eldest daughter of Xue family. She is a vicious woman who can do anything for the sake of power. She later becomes the consort of Emperor Shen Lang. In Xuening's previous life, she was the noble consort of Emperor Shen Jie.

- Hu Yunhao as Shen Lang

Emperor of Qian and elder brother of Shen Jie and Shen Zhiyi.

- Tu Hua as Empress Zheng
- Lu Yanbei as Noble Consort Qin
- Liu Jin Yan as Fang Miao

Daughter of the Imperial Astronomy Bureau Head. She entered the palace as one of the study partners of Princess Shen Zhiyi. She later becomes the consort of Shen Jie.

- Zong Fengyan as Former Prince Pingnan

Jiang mansion

- Lu Xingyu as Jiang Boyou, Jiang Xuening's father
- Yvonne Yung as Madame Meng, Jiang Xuening's mother
- Yu Zhongli as Jiang Xuehui

Biological daughter of Jiang Boyou and his concubine Wanniang. After her birth, she was switched with Jiang Xuening by Wanniang. As a result she became the legitimate and first daughter of the Jiang family. She later becomes the concubine of Shen Jie.

- Geng Liming as Wan Niang

Concubine of Jiang Boyou and biological mother of Jiang Xuehui.

- Gong Fangni as Tang'er
- Zhong Baoer as Lian'er

Xue family

- Huang Haibing as Xue Yuan

Head of Xue family and brother of Empress Dowager Xue

- Zhou Tishun as Xue Ye

Second son of Xue family.

- Jin Xuze as Xue Dingfei

Others

- Tang Mengjia as You Fangyin

Third daughter of the You family. In Xuening's previous life, she was Xuening's loyal attendant at the palace.

- Qin Tianyu as Lu Xian

Xie Wei's subordinate.

- Eddie Cheung as Yan Mu

Head of the Yan family and Yan Lin's father

- Xia Minghao as Gong Yicheng
- Tan Jianchang as Gu Chunfang
- Cai Zhuoyin as Yao Xi

Daughter of the Yao family who was betrothed to Zhang Zhe. She entered the palace as Princess Zhiyi's study partner.

- Wang Yani as You Yue

Second and legitimate daughter of the You family. She entered the palace as Princess Zhiyi's study partner.

- Yu Miaoxin as Wang Xinyi
- Lei Pengyu as Ren Weizhi, a salt merchant
- Fan Jingwen as Zhou Baoying
- Yang Gen as Zheng Bao

A palace eunuch. In Xuening's previous life, he was very loyal to Emperor Shen Jie. In current life, he becomes loyal to Jiang Xuening.

- Chen Junan as Chen Ying, minister of Ministry of Justice
- Jiang Xiaolin as Dao Qin, Xie Wei's subordinate

== Soundtrack ==
No.	English title	Chinese title	Artist	Notes
1.	"With Love"	与爱	Jane Zhang	Opening theme song
2.	"Lending Dream"	借梦	Zhou Shen	Ending theme song
3.	"Snowy Season"	雪季	Bai Lu	Character theme song
4.	"Won't See You in Three Thousand Worlds"	三千世界不见你	Jing Long	
5.	"Like a Dream"	如梦一场	Zhou Junwei	
6.	"My world"	我的天下	Janess Wong	Opening cantonese theme song
7.	"It's doomed"	一早註定	Rock Ho	Ending cantonese theme song

== International broadcast ==
Region	Network	Dates	Notes
Hong Kong, Macau	TVB Jade	25 March 2024 - 3 May 2024 (Monday to Friday at 9:30 PM)	Dubbed with Cantonese
United States	TVB1	25 March 2024 - 3 May 2024 Monday to Friday at 9:00 PM (Eastern Time) & 6:00 PM (Pacific Time) on Drama Theater	Dubbed with Cantonese
United States	TVB Jade San Francisco	25 March 2024 - 3 May 2024 Monday to Friday at 10:00 PM (Pacific Time) on Gold Drama Theater	Dubbed with Cantonese
United States	TVBJ1 New York	18 Nov 2024 - 30 Dec 2024 Monday to Friday at 10:00 PM (Eastern Time) & 7:00 PM (Pacific Time) on Gold Drama Theater	Dubbed with Cantonese
United States	TVBJ2 Los Angeles	18 Nov 2024 - 30 Dec 2024 Monday to Friday at 10:00 PM (Pacific Time) on Gold Drama Theater	Dubbed with Cantonese
United States	TVBe	10 Feb 2025 - 21 Mar 2025 Monday to Friday at 7:00 PM (Pacific Time) on Drama Theater	Dubbed with Cantonese
Canada	Fairchild TV	25 March 2024 - 3 May 2024 Monday to Friday at 8:20 PM (Eastern Time) & 5:20 PM (Pacific Time)	Dubbed with Cantonese
