= Charlie's Debut Album =

Studio album by Zhou Shen
- Released: November 6, 2017
- Labels: Taihe Music Group; Ocean Butterflies Music Co. Ltd.
- Producer: Yin Yue

Charlie's Debut Album (Chinese: 深的深) is the first album of Chinese male singer Zhou Shen which released on November 6, 2017. The album's songs, composer, lyricist and singer won four awards in total after the album released. "Big Fish", the best-known original song from Zhou Shen and "The Rose and the Deer", were also included in this album.

== Background and style ==
Charlie's Debut Album was a co-creation by Gao Xiaosong (songwriter & production supervisor), Yin Yue (lyricist) and Qian Lei (composer). This was also the first time for Yin Yue, a female lyricist in China, to act as album producer. This album took 3 years to complete the whole production, with ten original songs in total included in it. In addition to the digital version released by Taihe Music Group, the physical album was also released by Ocean Butterflies Music Co. Ltd. and Scent Library with the theme of "fragrance of literary and artistic youth".

Other than the main creators mentioned above attended the "Zhou Shen 2017 New Album Music Appreciation Salon", other staff involved in the production of this album also appeared, including Zhou Tianche (mixer and mastering engineer), Ni Hanwen (recording engineer and assistant mixer), Lost 7 (cover illustrator), Fang Liang (graphic designer), Chen Shu (Simplified Chinese handwriting), and the CEO and vice president Ocean Butterflies Music Co. Ltd. of Taihe Music Group.

== Track listing ==
Tracks in digital version and physical album are same as below:

1. 玫瑰与小鹿 The Rose and the Deer
2. 浅浅 Shallow
3. 哥哥 Brother
4. 迎刃 Towards the Blade
5. 蓝色降落伞 Blue Parachute
6. 风景 Scenery
7. 妳 You
8. 白墙 White Wall
9. 大鱼 Big Fish
10. 一缕执念 A Wisp of Fascination

== Awards ==
Year	Award Ceremony	Awards
2018	China Cultural Music Fiesta 2018	Best China Style Singing Performance - Big Fish
2018	Global Chinese Songs Chart 2018(0:45)	Best New Artist
2018	Global Chinese Songs Chart 2018(0:45)	Song of the Year - Blue Parachute
2018	25th ERC Chinese Top Ten Music Awards	Best Lyrics - Gao Xiaosong, Yin Yue - Blue Parachute
2018	25th ERC Chinese Top Ten Music Awards	Most Improved Artist of the Year
2018	22nd China Music Awards	Boosoo Most Popular Karaoke MV - Big Fish
2018	22nd China Music Awards	Channel V Best Live Performance - Big Fish
2018	Sichuan iRadio Minjiang Music Chart 2017 Year-End Music Award	Top 10 China Mainland albums of 2017 - Charlie's Debut Album
2017	Top Chinese Music Awards	Best Film Song - Big Fish
2017	24th ERC Chinese Top Ten Music Awards	Best Composition - Qian Lei
2017	24th ERC Chinese Top Ten Music Awards	Top 10 Songs of the Year - Big Fish
2016	DoNews Awards	Artist of the Year
2016	Music Pioneer Awards	Top 10 Songs of China - Big Fish
2016	Music Pioneer Awards	Best Composition - Qian Lei
2016	Fresh Asia Music Awards	Top 10 Songs of the Year - Big Fish
2016	Fresh Asia Music Awards	Top 10 Songs of the Year - The Rose and The Deer
