= Xu Ruohan =

Chinese actress (born 1998)

- 徐若晗
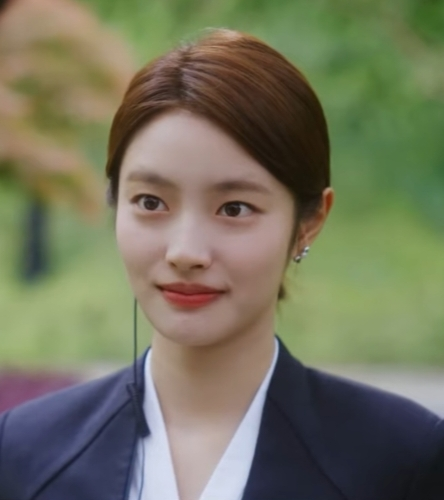
- Xu in The Best Thing (2025)
- Born: Xu Ruohan; 27 February 1998 (age 28); Xi'an, Shaanxi Province, China
- Education: Beijing Film Academy (BFA)
- Occupation: Actress
- Years active: 2020–present

Xu Ruohan (Chinese: 徐若晗; born 27 February 1998) is a Chinese actress best known for her debut role in the action thriller film Vanguard (2020) with Jackie Chan. She then starred in several romantic films and television series in leading roles, including Perfect and Casual (2020), The Hope (2023), The Forbidden Flower (2023), and The Best Thing (2025).

== Biography ==
Xu was born on 27 February 1998, in Xi'an, Shaanxi Province, China. She was interested in drawing and wished to publish an illustrated book or comic that documented her life when she was young. She took the art exam and was admitted to the Beijing Film Academy, later graduating with a Bachelor of Fine Arts in animation production. During her university years, she was recommended for a film audition and discovered by action film actor Jackie Chan. She starred in My Diary, an art film directed by Chan, in 2018. (Note: The film was unreleased.) She signed with an artist agency and debuted as an actress in the same year. In 2020, Xu was once again invited by Jackie Chan to star in a lead role as Fareeda, the daughter of a terrorist organization accountant, in the action thriller film Vanguard. The same year, she starred in a lead role in the Mango TV romance web series Perfect and Casual.

In 2022, Xu was cast as the female lead in Luo Luo's romance film Almost Love, starring alongside Li Wenhan as a pair of long-dated high school sweethearts. She also starred in the web series Out with a Bang and Catch Up My Prince in the same year. In 2023, she received another breakout performance in the romance series The Forbidden Flower. She portrayed He Yan, a dying artist who fell in love with a down-and-out man years older than her played by Jerry Yan. Xu's natural performance and onscreen chemistry with Yan were positively received. In 2024, Xu participated in the second season of Memories Beyond Horizon, an acting-themed contesting variety show, as one of the contestants.

== Filmography ==
=== Film ===
Year	Title		Role	Notes	Ref.
Year	English	Chinese	Role	Notes	Ref.
2020	Vanguard	急先锋	Fareeda	Main role	
2022	Almost Love	遇见你	Yu Ziaoyang	Main role	
2023	If We Were Lucky	不要走散好不好	Xia Mo	Main role	

=== Television ===
Year	Title		Role	Notes	Ref.
Year	English	Chinese	Role	Notes	Ref.
2020	Perfect and Casual	完美先生和差不多小姐	Yun Shu	Main role	
2022	Out With a Bang	瞄准你的未来	Xiong Jiujiu	Main role	
2023	Catch Up My Prince	公子不可求	Lu Yanyan	Main role	
2023	The Forbidden Flower	夏花	He Yan	Main role	
2023	The Hope	鸣龙少年	Cheng Yusha	Main role	
2024	Go Back Lover	再见, 怦然心动	Shen Xingruo	Main role	
2025	The Best Thing	爱你	Shen Xifan	Main role	
2026	Our Dazzling Days	岁月有情时	Ye Chunchun	Support role	
2026	The Lament of Autumn	玉簟秋	Ye Pingjun	Main role	
TBA	Sweetest Rebellion	一枕春华	Feng Jiaojiao	Main role	
TBA	Love in Red Dust	红尘四合	Mu Xiaoshu / Wen Dingyi	Main role	
TBA	Love Song in Summer	明川有知夏	Wen Xia	Main role	
TBA	Yi Lu Can Lan	一路灿烂	Zhou Yi	Guest role	

=== Variety show ===
Year	Title	Notes
2024	Memories Beyond Horizon	Second season; contestant

== Awards and nominations ==
Year	Award	Category	Work	Result	Ref.
2025	7th Asia Contents Awards & Global OTT Awards	Best Newcomer Actress	The Best Thing	Nominated	
