= Zhou Shen =

Chinese singer (born 1992)

- 周深
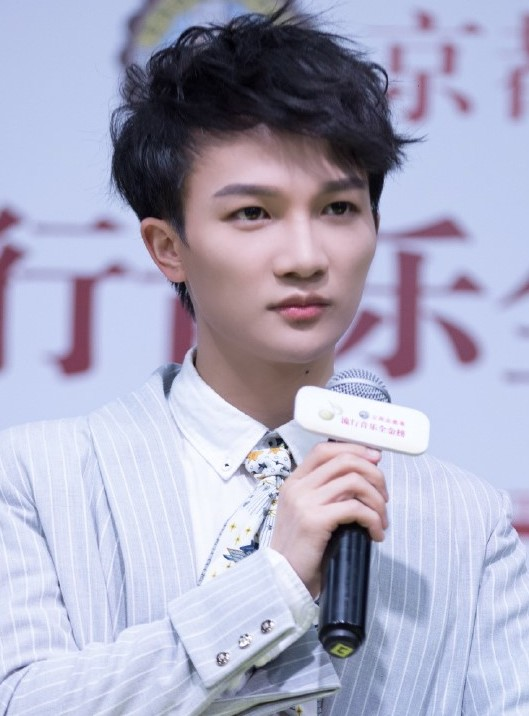
- Zhou in 2019
- Born: 29 September 1992 (age 34); Shaoyang, Hunan, China
- Other name: Charlie Zhou
- Education: Lviv National Music Academy
- Occupation: Singer
- Years active: 2014–present
- Notable work: "Big Fish" (大鱼), "Little Happiness" (小美满), "China in the Lights" (灯火里的中国), Rubia
- Musical career
- Genre: Mandopop
- Instruments: Vocals; guitar; piano
- Labels: Zhou Shen Studio (Shanghai Jinyan Culture Media Co.); The Voice of Dreams

Chinese name
- Traditional Chinese: 周深
- Simplified Chinese: 周深
Transcriptions
Standard Mandarin
- Hanyu Pinyin: Zhōu Shēn

Zhou Shen (Chinese: 周深; pinyin: Zhōu Shēn; born 29 September 1992), also known as Charlie Zhou, is a Chinese singer. He has released two albums and did OSTs for Chinese films and TV series including Big Fish & Begonia, Jiang Ziya, and The Wandering Earth 2, among many others.

He won the MTV Europe Music Award for Best Greater China Act in November 2019. In August 2020, he ranked 42nd on the Forbes China Celebrity List of 2020. The ERC Chinese Top Ten Awards named Zhou the Most Popular Male Singer of 2021 and 2022 and the Best Male Singer of 2023 and 2024. Since 2022, he has been a cast member of the popular Chinese variety show Keep Running.

In August 2022, his Douyin online concert "I Want to Be by Your Side" attracted over 140 million viewers. His 9.29 Hz World Concert Tour spanned stadiums in mainland China and arenas in North America, Malaysia and Australia.

== Early life ==
Zhou was born on September 29, 1992, in a mountain village in rural Shaoyang, Hunan. He and his older sister were left behind children, as his parents were very poor and would leave to find work in the city, only coming home once a year. Since his grandparents were no longer around, he and his sister had to look after themselves from a very young age. His family later moved to Guiyang, Guizhou during his third year of primary school. He was subsequently admitted to Guiyang No. 6 High School. Following high school graduation, he went to Ukraine to study dentistry due to more affordable tuition costs. However, after a year, he made the decision to transfer to Lviv National Musical Academy to study Bel canto instead. His vocal range can be classified as being that of a countertenor, specifically a sopranist, but he studied as a tenor in Lviv Conservatory. He graduated from Lviv Conservatory in September 2016.

== Career ==
=== 2010: Pre-debut ===
Zhou's music career began in 2010, when he began singing online on a Chinese video-based social network, YY.com, under the nickname 卡布叻, or Kabule.

=== 2014–2015: Participation in The Voice of China ===
After listening to Zhou's singing online, the director of The Voice of China invited Zhou to participate in the first and second seasons of the show. However, Zhou declined both invitations, fearful of how audiences would perceive his unique voice. Undeterred, the director continued to invite him for the following season, and although Zhou initially declined again, she persisted for 3 months until Zhou, touched by her efforts, accepted the invitation. Zhou participated in The Voice of China (season 3) and amazed the coaches with his cover of Chyi Yu's "Huan Yan" (欢颜) in the blind audition round. The song "Lake Baikal" (贝加尔湖畔) sung by Zhou and Li Wei in the competition was awarded Song of 2014 of The Voice of China. In the same year, Zhou participated in the live tour presented by The Voice of China.

He attended Beijing TV's New Year's Gala and supported the bid for the Olympic Winter Games in Beijing by singing a multi-language version of "Let It Go". He also participated in the world tour of the performing-arts extravaganza Cultures of China, Festival of Spring. In May, Zhou went to London to attend The Voice UK with Li Wei on behalf of The Voice of China. He then released a cover album called Aftertaste together with Li Wei in July. On 8 August 2015, Zhou's first single, "The Rose and the Deer", was released, and he won the Best New Artist of ERC Chinese Top Ten Awards.

=== 2016–2018: "Big Fish" and debut album ===
In May 2016, Zhou sang "Big Fish" for the Chinese animated film Big Fish & Begonia. "Big Fish" and "The Rose and the Deer" were both selected as part of the Top 10 Hits Songs of Freshasia Music Award 2016. ERC Chinese Top Ten Awards named "Big Fish" one of the Top 10 Songs of the Year, and awarded Zhou the People's Choice Male Singer of 2017. He also won the Most Popular Male Singer Online of Music Pioneer Award 2016.

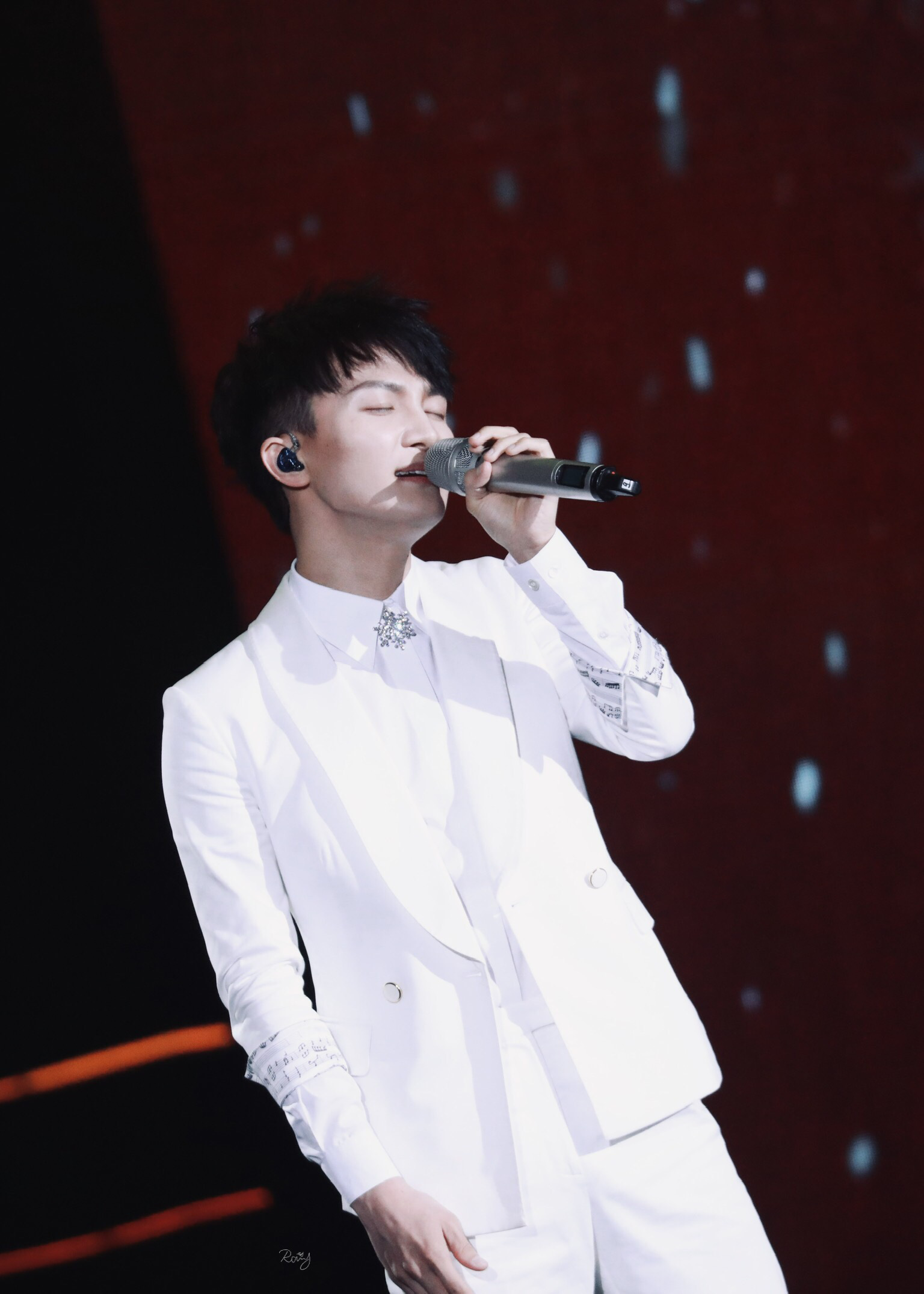
Zhou performing in 2019

Following the phenomenal success of "Big Fish", other films and series began to invite Zhou to perform songs for them, including "Echo" for the series The Starry Night The Starry Sea, "Calm Romance" for the film Brotherhood of Blades II: The Infernal Battlefield, and "Speechless" for the Chinese animation Dahufa. In October, Zhou appeared on the music show Mask Singer. In November 2017, Zhou released his debut album Charlie's Debut Album, created in collaboration with producer Gao Xiaosong, songwriter Yin Yue, and composer Qian Lei.

In 2018, Zhou performed over 10 songs for various films and TV series, including the Chinese promotional song for the Academy Award-winning film The Shape of Water. In May and June, Zhou embarked on his first concert tour, the Deep Space Tour, in Shanghai, Wuhan, and Chengdu. He won the Most Improved Artist of the ERC Chinese Top Ten Awards and the Best New Artist of the Global Chinese Music Chart Awards. In November, Zhou participated in the show Super–Vocal, where his performance of classic songs including "Time to Say Goodbye", "Memory", "Think of Me", and "The Lonely Goatherd" received extremely high praise from industry professionals. He participated in The Masked Singer again, this time using his Bel canto skills and versatile vocals to mislead the guessing panel.

=== 2019: Planet C-929 Tour, Our Song ===
In 2019, Zhou performed over 20 songs for various films and TV series, including "With the Wind" for Mystery of Antiques, "Only You" for Relying on Heaven to Slaughter Dragons, "Longing for a Wholehearted Lover" for Royal Nirvana, and "Untouchable" for The Upside. He was awarded Breakthrough Artist of the Year and the song "Blossom" won the Top 10 Songs of the Year from ERC Chinese Top Ten Awards 2019. A continuation of his first concert tour was held in Beijing in January, followed by Shenzhen and Hangzhou in June and July. In April, Zhou participated in the Super–Vocal and Never Say Goodbye concert tours. He also held a joint music concert with Isabelle Huang in Shanghai on 18 May. On 25 May, he attended Victor Wong's "The Pursuit of Happiness" concert in Beijing as a special guest. On 12 June, he participated in the Nanyang Khek Community Gift of Warmth Charity Concert 2019, a charity concert in Singapore for people with autism, together with Chyi Yu, Huang Hongying, and Roy Li Fei Huei.

In October 2019, Zhou was ranked on the music industry list of Forbes 30 Under 30 China 2019. On the 1 and 2 November 2019, he participated in the Nanjing The Untamed music concert, performing his song "Passing by the Deserted City". In November 2019, he won the MTV Europe Music Award for Best Greater China Act. From November 2019 to January 2020, he held his second concert tour, named Planet C-929, with stops in Beijing, Nanjing, Suzhou, Chengdu, Shanghai, and Guangzhou. From October 2019 to January 2020, Zhou participated in the first season of the singing competition Our Song, broadcast by Dragon TV, where his duets and comedic interactions with his senior partner, cantopop legend Hacken Lee, widely contributed to the popularity of the show. Zhou and Lee were ultimately crowned the winners of that season.

=== 2020: Singer 2020, end of contract with The Voice of Dreams ===
From February to April 2020, Zhou appeared on Hunan TV's Singer 2020 as an initial singer. Zhou was one of the most consistently high ranking contestants across all seasons of the show. He won first place in episode 8 for his cover of the song "Dalabengba", in which he blended singing with voice acting, using 5 different voices in his dynamic performance. This performance proceeded to go viral on Chinese platforms, receiving over 10 million views within a day of release and remaining trending on Chinese search engines. It dominated the music charts and within a month had over 100 million streams on Netease Cloud Music alone. This version has been widely praised by China's domestic music critics, noting how his viral performance has contributed to the spread of ACGN culture. "Dalabengba" won NetEase Cloud Music's 2020 Most Popular Single and Most Popular Show Performance categories.

From January to April 2020, he participated in the cultural reality show The Great Wall. As Zhou gained widespread recognition in 2020, he also appeared as a guest in many popular Chinese variety shows, including Day Day Up, Ace vs Ace, Back to Field, Smoothly Flowing Melodies, and Keep Running!. Zhou later participated in the variety show Youth Periplous II as a regular cast member.

On 19 July 2020, the establishment of Zhou Shen Studios was officially announced after his six year contract with The Voice of Dreams ended. His first online concert "Good Night, See You Tomorrow" was then held on 25 July through TME live, on the 6th anniversary of his debut. The concert was streamed on multiple platforms, and the QQ Music broadcast alone attracted over 7.2 million online viewers.

In August, he ranked 42nd on the Forbes China Celebrity List of 2020. Zhou collaborated several times with internationally renowned pianist Lang Lang, performing "Interstellar Train" on The Coming One: SUPER BAND as well as "Big Fish" and "Scarborough Fair" on Jiangsu TV's Kuaishou "One Thousand and One Nights" Gala on 30 October. On 16 October, Zhou also collaborated with renowned Mongolian singer Tengger to perform a mashup of "Big Fish" and Tengger's "Heaven" on the TikTok x Zhejiang TV Autumn Gala 2020.

From August to November 2020, Zhou appeared on the variety show Go Newbies, in which he learned how to drive and obtained his driving license. Starting from 4 November, Zhou Shen appeared in a workplace-observational reality show An Exciting Offer Season 2.

On 20 December, Zhou was awarded The Most Popular Singer of 2020 at the Tencent Video All-Stars Night 2020 Awards Ceremony. On 31 December, Zhou Shen gave performances at multiple New Year's Eve concerts, including China Media Group's "Set Sail 2021" New Year Gala, Jiangsu TV 2021 New Year Countdown Concert, Bilibili 2020 New Year's Eve Gala, "Welcoming Olympic Winter Games" Beijing Media Network's 2021 New Year Global Gala, and Guangdong TV 2020–2021 "Passing on Joy in Beautiful Life" New Year Celebration.

=== 2021: First appearance on CCTV's Spring Festival Gala ===
Since 6 November 2020, Zhou has been the official Promotion Ambassador of Guiyang Cultural Tourism, and he appeared on the cultural urban travel documentary Marvelous City presented by Youku on 5 January to introduce the city where he grew up. In January, Zhou was named The Most Popular Singer of 2020 at the Tencent Entertainment White Paper ceremony and the Best Mainland Male Singer of the Year at the Tencent Music Entertainment Awards. On 27 January, Zhou was announced as a mentor for the Tencent's talent show Chuang 2021. His impromtu cover of a famous Ukrainian pop song "Річка" in the show with a Ukrainian trainee was broadcast on several Ukrainian news channels.

During the 2021 Lunar New Year, Zhou performed at numerous Spring Festival galas, including China Media group's, Tencent's, Hunan TV's, Jiangsu TV's, and CCTV's 2021 Lantern Festival Gala. Most notable was his first appearance on CCTV's "CCTV New Year's Gala" and his critically acclaimed performance of "China in the Lights" (灯火里的中国) with singer Zhang Ye. The performance exceeded 100 million views cumulatively across Chinese video platforms the day after it aired.

On 9 April, Zhou participated in the Global Diplomats' Chinese Cultural Night, where he was awarded the 2020 Most Influential Youth Singer of the Year. On 25 May, Zhou collaborated with world-renowned composer and conductor Tan Dun in the Nanshan Pop Festival 2021. On 31 May, he participated in a public welfare project aimed at providing more opportunities for rural children.

=== 2022–2023: Keep Running, Thank You Concert ===
Beginning in 2022, Zhou has become a regular cast member Keep Running. The program director, Yao Yitian, noted one reason he invited Zhou is because of Zhou's thoughtfulness and consideration towards others, which has contributed to the atmosphere of the show.

In 2023, Zhou sang theme songs for various films and series, including "Endless Sailing" and "Eternal Solitude" for Three-Body, "Humans are ___" for The Wandering Earth 2, "Free Floating" for Back from the Brink, "Dazzling Adventurer" for Soul Land 2: The Peerless Tang Clan, "Borrowing a Dream" for Story of Kunning Palace, "I'm a Star" for the Chinese release of Disney's Wish, and the Chinese version of Suzume.

On 21 January 2023, Zhou made his second appearance at CCTV's Spring Gala Festival, performing the song "Blossoming Flowers, Forgetting Sorrows" (花开忘忧).

He served as the Public Welfare Ambassador for the 2022 United Nations Biodiversity Conference (COP15). A wax figure of Zhou Shen was unveiled at Madame Tussauds Beijing on 25 July 2023. On 19 August 2023, Zhou held a special thank you concert "深深感谢你" at Beijing's Wukesong arena.

=== 2024–present: Shenself and 9.29Hz World Concert Tour ===
In January 2024, Zhou was awarded Most Popular Singer of the Year at the Weibo Awards Ceremony. In February, his OST for the movie YOLO was released; the song, "Little Happiness" (小美满), proceeded to dominate the weekly charts across Chinese platforms and was awarded Movie Song of the Year at the 2023–2024 at the China Movie Data Gala and Awards Ceremony of China Movie Channel M-Chart. On 9 February 2024, Zhou made his third appearance in CCTV Spring Festival Gala with the song "Health Order" (健康到到令).

On 18 April 2024, Zhou was invited to attend the 15th annual United Nations Chinese Language Day at the UN headquarters in New York. He participated in the roundtable discussions and performed the song "Ode to Peace", which was composed specifically for the occasion, in addition to his songs "Big Fish" and "Wait for Me".

On 31 March 2024, "Mirage", the first song from Zhou's second album, was released. In May 2024, Zhou Shen's 9.29 Hz concert tour officially launched in stadiums across China. Tickets for every concert sold out within seconds of release. On 19 May 2024, his second album Shenself (反深代词) was released globally through Warner Music. The album sales exceeded 1 million copies one week after release. Shenself ranked 11th on the 2024 IFPI Global Album Sales Chart, making Zhou the only Chinese artist to appear on the chart in 2024.

On 28 January 2025, Zhou made his fourth appearance on CCTV's Spring Festival Gala, performing a mash-up of Peruvian folk song "El Cóndor Pasa" and Chinese folk song "Lan Huahua" with renowned operatic tenor Juan Diego Flórez.

Beginning in February 2025, Zhou's 9.29 Hz concert tour went international, with stops in London, Las Vegas, Seattle, New York, Toronto, Melbourne, Sydney, and Kuala Lumpur. However, on 14 February, the London stop was cancelled due to health issues. After arriving in London on the 11th, Zhou experienced discomfort in his throat with symptoms worsening significantly on the 14th. Per the doctor's recommendation, the concert was cancelled. Tickets were refunded through the official ticket retailer AXS. Domestic travel and international train expenses were reimbursed in full while lodging and international flight expenses were reimbursed up to a set amount.

== Discography ==
=== Studio albums ===
- Charlie's Debut Album (2017)
- Shenself (2024)

== Concerts ==
=== Headlining tours ===
- Deep Space Tour (2018–2019)
- C-929 Planet Tour (2019–2020)
- 9.29 Hz World Concert Tour (2024–2025)
- Shenshen's Tour (2025–present)

== Awards ==
Year	Award ceremony	Awards
2014	IQiyi All-Star Carnival 2015	New Artist of the Year
2015	19th China Music Awards	Most Potential Group (Zhou Shen/Li Wei)
2016	DoNews Awards	Artist of the Year
2016	Music Pioneer Awards	Top 10 Songs of China – "Big Fish" (大鱼)
2016	Music Pioneer Awards	Most Popular Male Singer Online
2016	Freshasia Music Awards	Top 10 Songs of the Year – "Big Fish" (大鱼)
2016	Freshasia Music Awards	Top 10 Songs of the Year – "The Rose and the Deer" (玫瑰与小鹿)
2016	23rd ERC Chinese Top Ten Music Awards	Best New Artist
2017	Top Chinese Music Awards	Best Film Song – "Big Fish" (大鱼)
2017	24th ERC Chinese Top Ten Music Awards	People Selection Male Singer
2017	24th ERC Chinese Top Ten Music Awards	Top 10 Songs of the Year – "Big Fish" (大鱼)
2017	21st China Music Awards	Online Selection Best New Artist
2018	China Cultural Music Fiesta 2018	Best China Style Singing Performance – "Big Fish" (大鱼)
2018	Global Chinese Songs Chart Awards 2018	Best New Artist
2018	Global Chinese Songs Chart Awards 2018	Song of the Year – "Blue Parachute" (蓝色降落伞)
2018	25th ERC Chinese Top Ten Music Awards	Most Improved Artist of the Year
2018	22nd China Music Awards	Boosoo Most Popular Karaoke MV – "Big Fish" (大鱼)
2018	22nd China Music Awards	Channel V Best Live Performance – "Big Fish" (大鱼)
2018	All for Love Charity Ceremony	Charity Star of the Year
2019	Global Chinese Music Awards 2019	Outstanding Regional Artiste (Shanghai)
2019	Global Chinese Music Awards 2019	Most Popular Duet – "Plum Blossom Remain" (梅香如故) (with Mao Buyi)
2019	MTV Europe Music Awards 2019	Best Greater China Act
2019	Freshasia Music Awards	Song of the Year (Variety Show) - "The Doomsday Spacecraft" (末日飞船) (with Tang Hanxiao)
2019	Weibo Influential Big V Awards	Top 10 Influential Music-related Big V of Weibo 2019
2019	Weibo Influential Big V Awards	Top 10 Influential Original Musician of Weibo 2019
2019	CNR Music Radio China Top Music Awards	Campus Popularity Award for Performing Artists
2019	CNR Music Radio China Top Music Awards	Most Popular Singer of the Year
2019	Music Pioneer Awards	Most Popular Song of the Year – "Only You" (此生惟你)
2019	Music Pioneer Awards	Most Popular Male Singer
2019	Music Pioneer Awards	Best Film/Television Songs of the Year – "Metamorphosis" (蜕)
2019	Global Chinese Golden Chart Awards 2019	Best Stage Performance
2019	Global Chinese Golden Chart Awards 2019	Mainland Radio Station Recommended Singer
2019	23rd China Music Awards	Most Popular Male Singer – Mainland
2019	26th ERC Chinese Top Ten Music Awards	Breakthrough Artiste of the Year
2019	26th ERC Chinese Top Ten Music Awards	Top 10 Songs of the Year – "Blossom" (花开)
2020	2020 NetEase Annual Music Awards	2020 Most Popular Chinese Artist of the Year
2020	2020 NetEase Annual Music Awards	2020 Super Idol of the Year
2020	2020 NetEase Annual Music Awards	2020 Most Popular Single of the Year – "Da La Beng Ba" (达拉崩吧)
2020	2020 NetEase Annual Music Awards	2020 Most Popular Collaboration of the Year – "Senior Mediocre" (资深庸才)
2020	2020 NetEase Annual Music Awards	2020 Most Popular Show Performance of the Year – "Da La Beng Ba" (达拉崩吧)
2020	Tencent Video "All-Stars Night 2020" Awards Ceremony	Tencent Video "The Most Popular Singer of 2020"
2020	Superstar on Weibo	Top 10 Influential Musician on Weibo 2020
2020	Global Chinese Golden Chart Awards 2020	Best Love Song Performance of the Year
2020	Global Chinese Golden Chart Awards 2020	Media Recommend Male Singer of the Year
2020	Global Chinese Golden Chart Awards 2020	Fairchild Radio Recommend Singer
2020	27th ERC Chinese Top Ten Music Awards	Media Recommend Singer
2020	27th ERC Chinese Top Ten Music Awards	Top 10 Songs of the Year – "Flow with the Wind" (随风)
2020	27th ERC Chinese Top Ten Music Awards	OST Singer of the Year
2020	Sina Entertainment Grand Ceremony	Most Popular Variety Show Guest
2020	Sina Entertainment Grand Ceremony	Top 10 Music Production – "Ring the Doorbell, Listen by Yourself" (自己按门铃自己听)
2020	Sina Entertainment Grand Ceremony	Most Popular Live Stage – "Da La Beng Ba" (达拉崩吧)
2020	China Films Honorary Ceremony 2019	Promotional Film Song of 2019 – "Genesis" (缘起)
2021	Global Diplomats Chinese Cultural Night	2021 Most Influential Young Singer
2021	2021 Television Series of China Quality Ceremony	Most Quality OST of the Year – "Soften the Glare, Unify as Dust" (和光同尘)
2021	2020 China Music Billboard Awards	Most Popular Male Singer
2021	2020 China Music Billboard Awards	Most Popular OST – "Only You" (此生惟你)
2021	Global Chinese Golden Chart Awards 2021	Top 20 Songs of the Year – "Who Am I to You" (我是你的谁)
2021	Tencent Music Entertainment Awards 2020	Best Mainland Male Singer of the Year
2021	Tencent Music Entertainment Awards 2020	Top 10 Songs of the Year – "The Upside" (触不可及)
2021	Bilibili Music Awards 2020	Most-Viewed Uploader of the Year
2021	Bilibili Music Awards 2020	Musician of the Year
2022	Tencent Music Entertainment Awards 2022	Best Mainland Male Singer of the Year
2022	Tencent Music Entertainment Awards 2022	Top 10 Songs of the Year – "Shining with the Light" (和光同尘)
2022	Tencent Music Entertainment Awards 2022	Top Inspirational Song of the Year – "Song of the World" (国际歌)
2022	Five-one Project Award (五个一工程奖)	"My Answer" (我的答案)
2022	Five-one Project Award (五个一工程奖)	"China in the Lights" (灯火里的中国)
2022	Chinese Top Ten Music Awards 2022	Most Popular Male Singer
2022	Chinese Top Ten Music Awards 2022	Outstanding Asian Singer
2022	Chinese Top Ten Music Awards 2022	Top 10 Songs of the Year – "Shining Light" (光亮)
2022	Weibo Awards	Male Musician of the Year
2022	Weibo Music Awards	Outstanding Male Musician of the Year
2023	Tencent Music Entertainment Awards 2023	Most Influential Male Singer of the Year
2023	Tencent Music Entertainment Awards 2023	Highest Awarded Song – "Blossoming Flowers, Forgetting Sorrows" (花开忘忧)
2023	Five-one Project Award (五个一工程奖)	"Shameless Joy" (绽放的笑容)
2023	Chinese Top Ten Music Awards 2023	Top Male Singer
2023	Chinese Top Ten Music Awards 2023	Top 10 Songs of the Year – "Blossoming Flowers, Forgetting Sorrows" (花开忘忧)
2023	Weibo Awards	Most Popular Male Singer of the Year
2023	Weibo Music Awards	Outstanding Male Musician of the Year
2023	Starlight Award	Most Influential Male Singer of the Year
