= 2011 Super Girl =

- Season 2011
- Hosted by: He Jiong; Wang Han
- Judges: Xiao Ke; Wu Zhoutong; Hu Haiquan; Sa Dingding; Cai Guoqing; Ian Chen Jianning
- Winner: Jeremy Duan Linxi
- Runner-up: Cici Hong Chen

Release
- Original network: HBS Hunan Satellite TV
- Original release: 1 May 2011

Season chronology
- ← Previous; 2011 Super Girl Next → 2011 Super Girl

The 2011 Super Girl, also known as 2011 BBK Super Girl for sponsor reasons, premiered on HBS Hunan Satellite TV on May 1, 2011. The format had competitors give a performance, after which, viewers called in to vote for their favourite singers. The weakest two, as voted by the judges and the audience's text messages, faced-off subsequently in a head to head knock out PK, short for Player Kill. The loser of the PK would be eliminated each week until only one contestant remained the winner.

== Regional contest ==
National Top 20 Qualifications

Qualified Eliminated Eliminated by Regional Finals

Group 1
Region	1st place	2nd place	3rd place			6th place	7th place	8th place	9th place	10th place	11th place
Changsha 长沙; 3 June	Liu Xin 刘忻	Sun Xinxin 孙昕欣	Yang Yang 杨洋	Guan Yuhan 关予涵	Ni Danjie 倪丹洁	DL	Li Pan 李盼	Xia Wenjing 夏文婧	Zhong Wenjuan 钟文娟	Ye Mingzhu 叶明珠	None
Changsha 长沙; 3 June	276,241	2,175,862	1,080,492	191,524	31,139	758,779	1,360,148	20,375	37,138	553,330	None
Shenyang 沈阳; 4 June	Jia Lu 贾璐	Cai Tingyu 蔡婷玉	Dai Yingxuan 戴潆萱	Lu Yi 陆翊	Wang Moran 王蓦然	Dingding 丁丁	Chen Zitong 陈姿彤	Zhang Xi 张希	Su Tianqi 苏天琦	Zhuo Nuo 卓娜	None
Shenyang 沈阳; 4 June	7,126	116,975	37,694	22,304	15,224	17,594	395,231	26,775	6,908	179,400	None
Guangzhou 广州; 6 June	Liu Lin 刘琳	Zheng Jiuhong 郑湫泓	Su Miaoling 苏妙玲	Jin Yinling 金银玲	Zeng Qi 曾琦	Lin Xiaojia 林晓佳	Liu Xiandi 刘仙蒂	Wen Hongyu 文红玉	Ren Jinjue 任缙珏	Feng Lili 冯丽俐	None
Guangzhou 广州; 6 June	1,746	28,376	2,113	1,553	13,837	339,864	1,571	1,858	5,219	171,031	None
Group 2
Region	1st place	2nd place	3rd place				7th place	8th place	9th place	10th place	11th place
Chengdu 成都; 5 June	Wang Yijie 王艺洁	Qiu Yu 邱玉	Wang Xin 王欣	Mu Yishan 沐奕杉	Duan Linxi 段林希	Lisi Danni 李斯丹妮	Yu Jiali 喻佳丽	Tang Luyang 汤麓洋	Wang Junjie 王俊杰	Yi Kuan 易宽	None
Chengdu 成都; 5 June	20,149	680,802	653,503	287,017	507,764	4,440	20,751	760,868	8,395	84,906	None
Region	1st place	2nd place	3rd place			6th place	7th place	8th place	9th place	10th place	11th place
Xi'an 西安; 7 June	Liu Mengjie 刘梦洁	Wang Xiaoqing 王晓庆	Wu Han 吴含	Luo Yongjuan 罗永娟	Song Min 宋敏	Yang Yanuo 杨雅诺	Zhu Feng 朱枫	Yao Lin 姚琳	Huang Bo 黄博	Pu Youxi 蒲宥希	None
Xi'an 西安; 7 June	15,524	1,561	5,188	18,095	24,525	9,239	65,694	14,460	2,275	1,519	None
Hangzhou 杭州; 8 June	Hong Chen 洪辰	Li Yanni 李燕妮	Zheng Xing 郑星	Fu Mengni 付梦妮	Cui Tianqi 崔天琪	Wen Jing 文静	Nie Jingchun 聂竟淳	Wang Xingyan 王兴琰	Zheng Qinglin 郑庆琳	Wang Jiajia 王佳佳	Zheng Sirong 郑斯榕
Hangzhou 杭州; 8 June	9,299	16,898	2,202	3,312	2,386	1,514,426	1,247	2,259	19,858	17,141	11,759

== Final Contest ==
Champion Penalize during Super Girl School Retired Eliminated

Final Contest (Top 13)												Top 20	
No.	20 > 13 25 June	12 > 11 15 July	11 > 10 22 July	10 > 9 29 July	9 > 8 5 Aug.	8 > 7 12 Aug.	7 > 6 19 Aug.	6 > 5 26 Aug.	5 > 4 2 Sept.	4 > 3 9 Sept.	3 > 1 16 Sept.	No.	20 > 13 25 June
1	Su Miaoling 苏妙玲	Lisi Danni 李斯丹妮	Lu Yi 陆翊	Wang Yijie 王艺洁	Duan Linxi 段林希	Hong Chen 洪辰	Duan Linxi 段林希	Yang Yang 杨洋	Hong Chen 洪辰	Liu Xin 刘忻	Duan Linxi 段林希	14	Wen Jing 文静
2	Hong Chen 洪辰	Duan Linxi 段林希	Fu Mengni 付梦妮	Liu Xin 刘忻	Su Miaoling 苏妙玲	Yang Yang 杨洋	Liu Xin 刘忻	Hong Chen 洪辰	Su Miaoling 苏妙玲	Hong Chen 洪辰	Hong Chen 洪辰	15	Zeng Qi 曾琦
3	Yu Jiali 喻佳丽	Su Miaoling 苏妙玲	Su Miaoling 苏妙玲	Duan Linxi 段林希	Liu Xin 刘忻	Liu Xin 刘忻	Lisi Danni 李斯丹妮	Su Miaoling 苏妙玲	Liu Xin 刘忻	Duan Linxi 段林希	Liu Xin 刘忻	16	Wang Xin 王欣
4	Liu Xin 刘忻	Liu Xin 刘忻	Hong Chen 洪辰	Su Miaoling 苏妙玲	Hong Chen 洪辰	Lisi Danni 李斯丹妮	Yang Yang 杨洋	Liu Xin 刘忻	Duan Linxi 段林希	Su Miaoling 苏妙玲		17	Jia Lu 贾璐
5	Wang Yijie 王艺洁	Hong Chen 洪辰	Duan Linxi 段林希	Yu Jiali 喻佳丽	Lisi Danni 李斯丹妮	Duan Linxi 段林希	Su Miaoling 苏妙玲	Duan Linxi 段林希	Yang Yang 杨洋			18	Liu Lin 刘琳
6	Duan Linxi 段林希	Fu Mengni 付梦妮	Liu Xin 刘忻	Hong Chen 洪辰	Fu Mengni 付梦妮	Su Miaoling 苏妙玲	Hong Chen 洪辰	Lisi Danni 李斯丹妮				19	Cui Tianqi 崔天琪
7	Jin Yinling 金银玲	Wang Yijie 王艺洁	Wang Yijie 王艺洁	Yang Yang 杨洋	Yang Yang 杨洋	Wang Yijie 王艺洁	Wang Yijie 王艺洁					20	Liu Mengjie 刘梦洁
8	Lu Yi 陆翊	Yu Jiali 喻佳丽	Lisi Danni 李斯丹妮	Fu Mengni 付梦妮	Wang Yijie 王艺洁	Fu Mengni 付梦妮							
9	DL	DL	Yu Jiali 喻佳丽	Lisi Danni 李斯丹妮	Yu Jiali 喻佳丽								
10	Lisi Danni 李斯丹妮	Lu Yi 陆翊	Yang Yang 杨洋	Lu Yi 陆翊									
11	Fu Mengni 付梦妮	Yang Yang 杨洋	DL										
12	Yang Yang 杨洋	Jin Yinling 金银玲											
13	Sun Xinxin 孙昕欣												

== Episode 1: Top 12 into 11 ==
- Contestant No.13 Sun Xinxin (孙昕欣) retired before the beginning of this episode.

Special guest singer

- Vivi Jiang Yingrong (江映蓉)

Professional Judges

- Xiao Ke (小柯)
- Wu Zhoutong (伍洲彤)
- Hu Haiquan (胡海泉)

Weibo Judges

- Li Chengpeng (李承鹏)
- Zuo Yeben (作业本)
- Hanyizaici (韩姨在此)
- Xiao Qiang (小强)
- Su Cen (苏岑)
- Yu Leping (余乐平)
- Sisi Laoshi (思思老师)

1,000 Public Audiences (votes)

=== Round 1: New Voice PK ===
- Contestant No.1 Yu Jiali (喻佳丽) penalize for Round 1

No.	Contestant	Song	Result				Lucky Loser
No.	Contestant	Song	Xiao	Hu	Wu	Status	Lucky Loser
2	Lisi Danni (李斯丹妮)	"LONDON BRIDGE"				Advanced	
3	Jin Yinling (金银玲)	"Que Sera Sera"				PK	
4	Hong Chen (洪辰)	《空港》 [Kōnggǎng]				Advanced	
5	Fu Mengni (付梦妮)	《夜猫》 [Yèmāo]				Advanced	
6	Duan Linxi (段林希)	《难道》 [Nándào]				Advanced	
7	Wang Yijie (王艺洁)	"Over the Rainbow"				Advanced	
8	Yang Yang (杨洋)	《一帘幽梦》 [Yī Lián Yōu Mèng]				Pending	
9	Su Miaoling (苏妙玲)	《一心何求》 [Yī-Xīn-Hé-Qiú]				Advanced	
10	Lu Yi (陆翊)	《我最親愛的》 [Wǒ Zuì Qīn'ài De]				Pending	
11	DL [group]	"WOW"				Pending	
12	Liu Xin (刘忻; English: Moraynia Liu)	《星期六的深夜》 [Xīngqīliù De Shēnyè]				Advanced	

Round 1 PK

No.	Contestant	Song	Result			
No.	Contestant	Song	Xiao	Hu	Wu	Status
1	Yu Jiali (喻佳丽)	《背叛》 [Bèipàn]				Succeed
3	Jin Yinling (金银玲)	"Que Sera Sera"	see above			Final PK

=== Round 2: Quarta Roulette PK ===
- Contestant No.3 Jin Yinling (金银玲) penalize for Round 2

No.	Contestant	Popularity Rank	Song	Weibo Judges' Result							
No.	Contestant	Popularity Rank	Song	Li	Zuo	Hanyi	Xiao	Su	Yu	Sisi	Status
10	Lu Yi (陆翊)	4th	《月牙湾》 [Yuèyá Wān]								Safe
11	DL [group]	3rd	《新贵妃醉酒》 [Xīn Guìfēi Zuìjiǔ]								Pending
10	Lu Yi (陆翊)	4th	《月牙湾》 [Yuèyá Wān]								Pending
8	Yang Yang (杨洋)	2nd	《千言万语》 [Qiānyánwànyǔ]								Safe
8	Yang Yang (杨洋)	2nd	《千言万语》 [Qiānyánwànyǔ]								Pending
1	Yu Jiali (喻佳丽)	1st	"Listen"								Advanced

Professional Judges' Final Judgement

No.	Contestant	Song	Result
8	Yang Yang (杨洋)	《千言万语》 [Qiānyánwànyǔ]	Pending
10	Lu Yi (陆翊)	《月牙湾》 [Yuèyá Wān]	Pending
11	DL [group]	《新贵妃醉酒》 [Xīn Guìfēi Zuìjiǔ]	Advanced

=== Round 3: Contestants Voting ===
No.	Contestant	Advanced Contestants' Result									
No.	Contestant	Lisi	Duan	Su	Liu	Hong	Fu	Wang	Yu	DL	Status
8	Yang Yang (杨洋)										Final PK
10	Lu Yi (陆翊)										Advanced

=== Round 4: Final PK ===
No.	Contestant	Song	1,000 Public Audiences' Result	
No.	Contestant	Song	Votes	Status
3	Jin Yinling (金银玲)	《爱情的味道》 [Àiqíng De Wèidào]	329	Eliminated
8	Yang Yang (杨洋)	《不想让你知道》 [Bù Xiǎng Ràng Nǐ Zhīdào]	623	Advanced
Abstention			48	—

== Episode 2: Top 11 into 10 ==
Professional Judges

- Sa Dingding (萨顶顶)
- Hu Haiquan (胡海泉)
- Xiao Ke (小柯)

Weibo Judges

- Chenlanshui Yao (陈岚水妖)
- Ma Wei CUC (马威CUC)
- Hanyizaici (韩姨在此)
- Da Peng (大鹏)
- Ye Zichun (叶子淳)
- Li Dingwen (李定文)
- Sisi Laoshi (思思老师)

1,000 Public Audiences (votes)

=== Round 1: Team Leader PK ===
- Contestant No.7 Wang Yijie (王艺洁) penalize for Round 1

No.	Contestant	Team	Song	Result		Team Pts		Lucky Loser
No.	Contestant	Team	Song	Choice	Status	1	2	Lucky Loser
10	Lu Yi (陆翊)	2	《下个，路口，见》 [Xià Gè, Lùkǒu, Jiàn]		Advanced	0	1	
11	DL [group]	1	《狐狸精》 [Húlíjīng]		Pending	0	1	
1	Yu Jiali (喻佳丽)	1	《征服》 [Zhēngfú]		Pending	0	2	
5	Fu Mengni (付梦妮)	2	《潘朵拉》 [Pān Duǒlā]		Advanced	0	2	
9	Su Miaoling (苏妙玲)	2	《爱的代价》 [Ài De Dàijià]		Advanced	1	2	
12	Liu Xin (刘忻)	1	《各自远飏》 [Gèzì Yuǎnyáng]		Advanced	1	2	
2	Lisi Danni (李斯丹妮)	1	《烦》 [Fán]		Pending	2	2	
4	Hong Chen (洪辰)	2	《做我自己》 [Zuò Wǒ Zìjǐ]		Advanced	2	2	
6	Duan Linxi (段林希)	2	《传奇》 [Chuánqí]		Advanced	2	3	
8	Yang Yang (杨洋)	1	《相思河畔》 [Xiāngsī Hépàn]		Pending	2	3	

Round 1 PK

No.	Contestant	Song	Result			
No.	Contestant	Song	Sa	Hu	Xiao	Status
7	Wang Yijie (王艺洁)	"Dreams"				Succeed
8	Yang Yang (杨洋)	《相思河畔》 [Xiāngsī Hépàn]	see above			Final PK

=== Round 2: Quarta Roulette PK ===
- Contestant No.8 Yang Yang (杨洋) penalize for Round 2

No.	Contestant	Song	Weibo Judges' Result							
No.	Contestant	Song	Chenlan	Ma	Hanyi	Da	Ye	Li	Sisi	Status
1	Yu Jiali (喻佳丽)	"I Will Always Love You"								Safe
2	Lisi Danni (李斯丹妮)	"Sober"								Pending
1	Yu Jiali (喻佳丽)	"I Will Always Love You"								Pending
7	Wang Yijie (王艺洁)	《橄榄树》 [Gǎnlǎnshù]								Safe
7	Wang Yijie (王艺洁)	《橄榄树》 [Gǎnlǎnshù]								Advanced
11	DL [group]	《爱之初体验》 [Ài Zhī Chū Tǐyàn]								Pending

Professional Judges' Final Judgement

No.	Contestant	Song	Result
1	Yu Jiali (喻佳丽)	"I Will Always Love You"	Pending
2	Lisi Danni (李斯丹妮)	"Sober"	Advanced
11	DL [group]	《爱之初体验》 [Ài Zhī Chū Tǐyàn]	Pending

=== Round 3: Contestants Voting ===
No.	Contestant	Advanced Contestants' Result								
No.	Contestant	Su	Fu	Liu	Lu	Duan	Hong	Lisi	Wang	Status
1	Yu Jiali (喻佳丽)									Advanced
11	DL [group]									Final PK

=== Round 4: Final PK ===
No.	Contestant	Song	1,000 Public Audiences' Result	
No.	Contestant	Song	Votes	Status
8	Yang Yang (杨洋)	《明天我要嫁给你》 [Míngtiān Wǒ Yào Jià Gěi Nǐ]	493	Advanced
11	DL [group]	《小酒窝》 [Xiǎo Jiǔwō]	460	Eliminated
Abstention			47	—

== Episode 3: Top 10 into 9 ==
Special guest singer

- Lo Ta-yu (罗大佑)

Professional Judges

- Sa Dingding (萨顶顶)
- Hu Haiquan (胡海泉)
- Cai Guoqing (蔡国庆)

Weibo Judges

- Paoxiao Nulang Bai Bangni (咆哮女郎柏邦妮)
- Ma Rila (马日拉)
- Chaoren Xu Fengli (潮人徐峰立)
- Li Dingwen (李定文)
- Zhèng Yàqí (郑亚旗)

1,000 Public Audiences (votes)

=== Round 1: Popularity Rank PK ===
- Contestant No.10 Lu Yi (陆翊) penalize for Round 1

Group	No.	Contestant	Song	Result		Lucky Loser
Group	No.	Contestant	Song	Choice	Status	Lucky Loser
1	6	Duan Linxi (段林希)	《天亮了》 [Tiānliàng Le]		Advanced	
1	7	Wang Yijie (王艺洁)	《滚滚红尘》 [Gǔngǔn Hóngchén]		Advanced	
1	12	Liu Xin (刘忻)	"You Are Not Alone"		Advanced	
2	4	Hong Chen (洪辰)	《南泥湾》 [Nánníwān]		Advanced	
2	5	Fu Mengni (付梦妮)	《甩啦甩啦》 [Shuǎi La Shuǎi La]		Pending	
2	9	Su Miaoling (苏妙玲)	《我可以抱你吗》 [Wǒ Kěyǐ Bào Nǐ Ma]		Advanced	
3	2	Lisi Danni (李斯丹妮)	《对你爱不完》 [Duì Nǐ Ài Bù Wán]		Pending	
3	1	Yu Jiali (喻佳丽)	《爱不爱我》 [Ài Bù Ài Wǒ]		Advanced	
3	8	Yang Yang (杨洋)	《当》 [Dāng]		Pending	

Round 1 PK

No.	Contestant	Song	Result			
No.	Contestant	Song	Hu	Cai	Sa	Status
10	Lu Yi (陆翊)	《野花》 [Yěhuā]				Succeed
2	Lisi Danni (李斯丹妮)	《对你爱不完》 [Duì Nǐ Ài Bù Wán]	see above			Final PK

=== Round 2: Trios PK ===
- Contestant No.2 Lisi Danni (李斯丹妮) penalize for Round 2

No.	Contestant	Song	Weibo Judges' Result					
No.	Contestant	Song	Bai	Ma	Xu	Li	Zheng	Status
10	Lu Yi (陆翊)	《最初的梦想》 [Zuìchū De Mèngxiǎng]						Safe
5	Fu Mengni (付梦妮)	《狠狠爱》 [Hěnhěn Ài]						Pending
5	Fu Mengni (付梦妮)	《狠狠爱》 [Hěnhěn Ài]						Pending
8	Yang Yang (杨洋)	《云儿》 [Yún'ér]						Advanced

=== Round 3: Contestants Voting ===
No.	Contestant	Advanced Contestants' Result							
No.	Contestant	Wang	Yang	Hong	Su	Duan	Yu	Liu	Status
5	Fu Mengni (付梦妮)								Advanced
10	Lu Yi (陆翊)								Final PK

=== Round 4: Final PK ===
No.	Contestant	Song	1,000 Public Audiences' Result	
No.	Contestant	Song	Votes	Status
2	Lisi Danni (李斯丹妮)	"Great DJ"	596	Advanced
10	Lu Yi (陆翊)	《我真的受伤了》 [Wǒ Zhēn De Shòushāng Le]	376	Eliminated
Abstention			28	—

== Episode 4: Top 9 into 8 ==
Special guest singer

- King Wang Ye (王野)
- Caesar Li Mao (李茂)
- Ahu Wang Yuexin (王栎鑫)
- Wuyi (武艺)
- Jaki Tan Jiexi (谭杰希)
- Jeffrey G Ji Jie (吉杰)
- Bird Zhang Yuan (张远)
- Chen Xiang (陈翔)
- Well Li Wei (李炜)

Professional Judges

Wu Zhoutong (伍洲彤)

- Hu Haiquan (胡海泉)
- Sa Dingding (萨顶顶)

Weibo Judges

- Sisi Laoshi (思思老师)
- Zang Qin (臧勤)
- Ting Ye (丁野)
- Ye Zichun (叶子淳)
- Li Wei(李伟)

1,000 Public Audiences (votes)

=== Round 1: Help to Sing PK ===
- Contestant No.8 Yang Yang (杨洋) penalize for Round 1

No.	Contestant	Helper	Song	Result		Advancement
No.	Contestant	Helper	Song	Choice	Status	Advancement
12	Liu Xin (刘忻)	Well Li Wei (李炜)	《温柔》 [Wēnróu]		Pending	
6	Duan Linxi (段林希)	Jaki Tan Jiexi (谭杰希)	《你的电话》 [Nǐ De Diànhuà]		Safe	
5	Fu Mengni (付梦妮)	Wuyi (武艺)	《心愿便利贴》 [Xīnyuàn Biànlìtiē]		Pending	
9	Su Miaoling (苏妙玲)	Chen Xiang (陈翔)	《遇见》 [Yùjiàn]		Safe	
1	Yu Jiali (喻佳丽)	King Wang Ye (王野)	《当爱已成往事》 [Dāng Ài Yǐ Chéng Wǎngshì]		Pending	
4	Hong Chen (洪辰)	Ahu Wang Yuexin (王栎鑫)	"So What"		Safe	
2	Lisi Danni (李斯丹妮)	Caesar Li Mao (李茂)	《音浪》 [Yīnlàng]		Pending	
7	Wang Yijie (王艺洁)	Jeffrey G Ji Jie (吉杰)	"Unchained Melody"		Safe	

Round 1 PK

No.	Contestant	Helper	Song	Result			
No.	Contestant	Helper	Song	Wu	Hu	Sa	Status
8	Yang Yang (杨洋)	Bird Zhang Yuan (张远)	《归去来》 [Guīqù Lái]				Succeed
1	Yu Jiali (喻佳丽)	King Wang Ye (王野)	《当爱已成往事》 [Dāng Ài Yǐ Chéng Wǎngshì]	see above			Final PK

=== Round 2: Duo PK ===
- Contestant No.1 Yu Jiali (喻佳丽) penalize for Round 2

No.	Contestant	Song	Result						Lucky Loser
No.	Contestant	Song	Sisi	Zang	Ding	Ye	Li	Status	Lucky Loser
7	Wang Yijie (王艺洁)	"Waka Waka"						Pending	
12	Liu Xin (刘忻)	《无以伦比的美丽》 [Wúyǐlúnbǐ De Měilì]						Advanced	
4	Hong Chen (洪辰)	"If I Were a Boy"						Advanced	
8	Yang Yang (杨洋)	《燕尾蝶》 [Yànwěidié]						pending	
2	Lisi Danni (李斯丹妮)	"Love"						Advanced	
5	Fu Mengni (付梦妮)	"Lemon Tree"						Advanced	

=== Round 3: Special guest singer Voting ===
No.	Contestant	Special guest singer' Result									
No.	Contestant	Li W.	Chen	Zhang	Ji	Tan	Wuyi	Wang Y.	Li M.	Wang K.	Status
7	Wang Yijie (王艺洁)										Final PK
8	Yang Yang (杨洋)										Advanced

=== Round 4: Final PK ===
No.	Contestant	Song	1,000 Public Audiences' Result	
No.	Contestant	Song	Votes	Status
1	Yu Jiali (喻佳丽)	《海阔天空》 [Hǎikuòtiānkōng]	452	Eliminated
7	Wang Yijie (王艺洁)	《爱的箴言》 [Ài De Zhēnyán]	518	Advanced
Abstention			30	—

== Episode 5: Top 8 into 7 ==
Special guest singer

- Sun Nan (孙楠)

Professional Judges

Wu Zhoutong (伍洲彤)

- Hu Haiquan (胡海泉)
- Sa Dingding (萨顶顶)

Weibo Judges

- Li Yang (李阳)
- Bufeiyan (步非烟)
- Li Xiaonan (李晓楠)
- Wang Shasha (王莎莎)
- Mu Xiaodan (母小丹)

1,000 Public Audiences (votes)

=== Round 1: Spinning Wheel PK ===
- Contestant No.2 Lisi Danni (李斯丹妮) penalize for Round 1

No.	Contestant	Song	Result			
No.	Contestant	Song	Chen	Cai	Sa	Status
12	Liu Xin (刘忻)	《没关系》 [Méiguānxì]				Safe
5	Fu Mengni (付梦妮)	《心愿便利贴》 [Xīnyuàn Biànlìtiē]				Pending
12	Liu Xin (刘忻)	《没关系》 [Méiguānxì]				Pending
4	Hong Chen (洪辰)	《天高地厚》 [Tiāngāodìhòu]				Safe
4	Hong Chen (洪辰)	《天高地厚》 [Tiāngāodìhòu]				Safe
8	Yang Yang (杨洋)	《在水一方》 [Zài Shuǐ Yīfāng]				Pending
4	Hong Chen (洪辰)	《天高地厚》 [Tiāngāodìhòu]				Safe
9	Su Miaoling (苏妙玲)	《朋友》 [Péngyǒu]				Pending
4	Hong Chen (洪辰)	《天高地厚》 [Tiāngāodìhòu]				Safe
6	Duan Linxi (段林希)	《春天里》 [Chūntiān Lǐ]				Pending
4	Hong Chen (洪辰)	《天高地厚》 [Tiāngāodìhòu]				Advanced
7	Wang Yijie (王艺洁)	《牧歌》 [Mùgē]				Pending

Round 1 PK

No.	Contestant	Song	Result			
No.	Contestant	Song	Wu	Hu	Sa	Status
2	Lisi Danni (李斯丹妮)	《归去来》 [Guīqù Lái]				Succeed
5	Fu Mengni (付梦妮)	《心愿便利贴》 [Xīnyuàn Biànlìtiē]	see above			Final PK

=== Round 2: Contestant Selection PK ===
- Contestant No.5 Fu Mengni (付梦妮) penalize for Round 2

No.	Contestant	Song	Result									Lucky Loser
No.	Contestant	Song	Li Y	Bu	Li X	Wang	Mu	Chen	Cai	Sa	Status	Lucky Loser
7	Wang Yijie (王艺洁)	《浮躁》 [Fúzào]									Pending	
8	Yang Yang (杨洋)	《美丽的神话》 [Měilì De Shénhuà]									Advanced	
6	Duan Linxi (段林希)	《她来听我的演唱会》 [Tā Lái Tīng Wǒ De Yǎnchàng Huì]									Advanced	
12	Liu Xin (刘忻)	《羞答答的玫瑰静悄悄的开》 [Xiūdādá De Méiguī Jìng Qiāoqiāo De Kāi]									Advanced	
2	Lisi Danni (李斯丹妮)	《潇洒小姐》 [Xiāosǎ Xiǎojiě]									Advanced	
9	Su Miaoling (苏妙玲)	《心恋》 [Xīn Liàn]									Pending	

=== Round 3: Final PK ===
- Contestant No.5 Fu Mengni (付梦妮) selected Contestant No.7 Wang Yijie (王艺洁) for Final PK and selected Contestant No.9 Su Miaoling (苏妙玲) for auto advancement.

No.	Contestant	Song	1,000 Public Audiences' Result	
No.	Contestant	Song	Votes	Status
5	Fu Mengni (付梦妮)	《女孩与四重奏》 [Nǚhái Yǔ Sìchóngzòu]	458	Eliminated
7	Wang Yijie (王艺洁)	《牵手》 [Qiānshǒu]	483	Advanced
Abstention			59	—

== Top 13 final contestants ==
No.	Name	Chinese name	Final rank
06	Jeremy Duan Linxi	段林希	1
04	Cici Hong Chen	洪辰	2
12	Moraynia Liu Xin	刘忻	3
09	Su Miaoling	苏妙玲	4
08	Yang Yang	杨洋	5
02	Dann Lisi Danni	李斯丹妮	6
07	Wang Yijie	王艺洁	7
05	Mini Fu Mengni	付梦妮	8
01	Kelly Yu Jiali	喻佳丽	9
10	Change Lu Yi	陆翊	10
11	DL	DL	11
03	Kim Jin Yinling	金银玲	12
13	Sun Xinxin	孙昕欣	13
