= Jason Zhang discography =

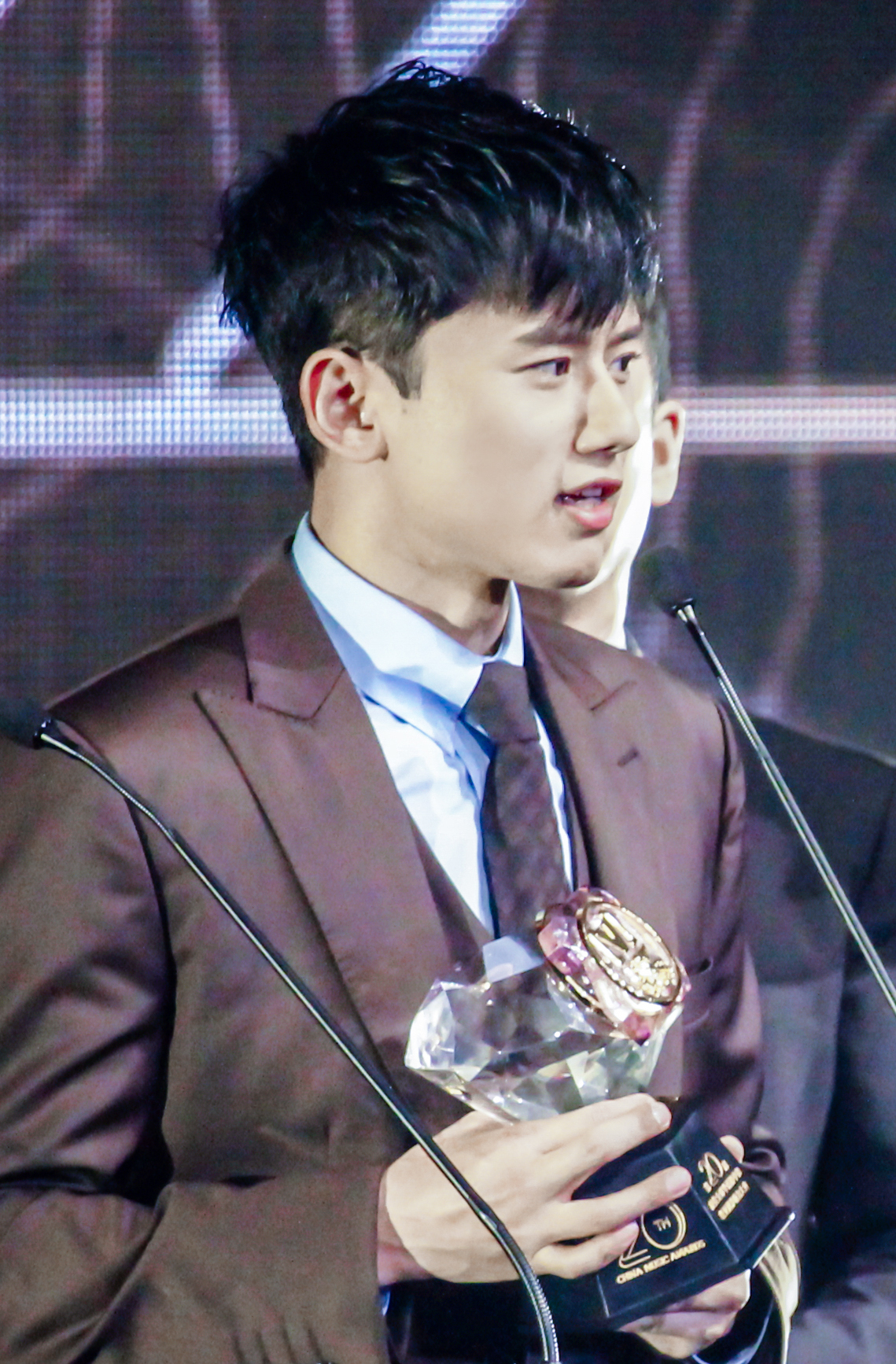
- Zhang in 2017
- Studio albums: 10
- EPs: 1
- Compilation albums: 1

This is the discography of Chinese recording artist Jason Zhang (Chinese: 張杰). He released his debut record title The First Album in March 2005.

== Albums ==
=== Studio albums ===
Title	Album details	Sales
The First Album (第一张)	Released: May 15, 2005; Label: Shang Teng Universal; Formats: CD, digital download, streaming	
Love Me Again (再爱我一回)	Released: September 20, 2006; Label: Shang Teng Universal; Formats: CD, digital download, streaming	
The Day After Tomorrow (明天过后)	Released: September 15, 2008; Label: EE-Media; Formats: CD, digital download, streaming	CHN: 100,000
Through Trilogy (穿越三部曲)	Released: November 2, 2009; Label: EE-Media; Formats: CD, digital download, streaming	
It's Love (这，就是爱)	Released: November 21, 2010; Label: EE-Media; Formats: CD, digital download, streaming	
Stand Up (最接近天堂的地方)	Released: November 18, 2011; Label: EE-Media; Formats: CD, digital download, streaming	
The Love Songs We Once Encountered (那些和我們打過招呼的愛情)	Released: November 26, 2012; Label: EE-Media; Formats: CD, digital download, streaming	
Just Love (爱，不解释)	Released: September 20, 2013; Label: EE-Media; Formats: CD, digital download, streaming	
Ten (拾)	Released: April 15, 2015; Label: EE-Media; Formats: CD, digital download, streaming	
Future Live (未Live)	Released: October 12, 2018; Label: Planet Culture; Formats: CD, digital download, streaming	

=== Compilation albums ===
Title	Album details
One Chance	Released: September 29, 2012; Label: EE-Media; Formats: CD, digital download, streaming

== Extended plays ==
Title	Album details
The Most Beautiful Sun (最美的太阳)	Released: December 17, 2007; Label: Shang Teng Universal; Formats: CD, digital download, streaming

== Singles ==
Name	Year	Album
我想	2016	《秘密花园》韩剧片尾曲
越爱越强	2016	
会孤单	2016	
You Are So Beautiful	2016	

=== TV shows ===
Name	Year	Album
年轻的战场	2006	《加油好男儿》主题曲
仰望星空	2008	厦门卫视主题曲
来跳舞吧	2008	舞动奇迹第二季主题曲（&苏醒）
快乐由我	2009	2009年湖南卫视跨年晚会主题曲(&天娱群星)
唱得响亮	2009	湖南卫视2009快乐女声(快乐男声13强)
快乐出发	2010	2010年湖南卫视跨年演唱会主题曲(&天娱群星)
元宵美	2010	2010年湖南卫视元宵晚会主题曲(&江映蓉)
8090的歌	2010	湖南卫视《8090》节目主题曲
我的舞台	2010	2010快乐男声主题曲
给力青春	2011	2011年湖南卫视跨年演唱会主题曲(&天娱群星)
哥哥	2011	北京卫视春晚主题曲(&常石磊等)
好好生活	2011	湖南卫视《好好生活》栏目主题曲
快乐到家	2013	2013湖南卫视小年夜春晚主题曲
爱到最美是陪伴	2015	2015《变形计》主题曲
直到世界的尽头	2015	江苏卫视环球探秘综艺真人秀《前往世界的尽头》主题曲
真心英雄	2015	江苏卫视《真心英雄》主题曲

=== Online games ===
Name	Year	Album
征途	2006	网游《征途》
天下	2008	网游《天下》
龙鳞	2009	网游《龙》
着魔	2010	网游《恶魔法则》
逆战	2012	腾讯游戏《逆战》主题曲
逆态度	2013	枪战射击网游《逆战》

== Soundtracks ==
=== Films ===
Name	Released	Album
勿忘心安	June 24, 2009	电影《窃听风云》主题曲
徒手	May 24, 2010	电影《枪王之王》主题曲
心中一把火	August 1, 2010	电影《嘻游记》主题曲
这就是爱	November 21, 2010	电影《我们约会吧》主题曲
这里是神奇的赛尔号	June 16, 2011	电影《赛尔号》主题曲
搁浅	May 25, 2012	电影《潘多拉的宝剑》主题曲
我在这里	January 4, 2015	电影《二炮手》插曲
老婆	December 15, 2014	电影《二炮手》主题曲
娑婆世界	May 28, 2015	电影《道士下山》推广曲
一念之间(+莫文蔚)	July 23, 2015	电影《道士下山》主题曲
"Lost in the star"	August 12, 2016	Star Trek China theme song
"Give you my world"	November 23, 2016	Allied global promotion song
"Torches"		Transformers: The Last Knight theme song

=== Microfilms ===
Name	Album
街角的祝福	微电影《坏未来》主题曲
伤痕	微电影《爱情规划局》主题曲
他不爱我	微电影《末日来电》主题曲
夜盲症	微电影《逐爱之旅》 插曲
原来你什么都不想要	微电影《末日过后》主题曲

=== TV dramas ===
Name	Released	Album
风华正茂	June 17, 2011	电视剧《风华正茂》主题曲
黄种人		电视剧《壮士出征》主题曲
美丽爱情(+陈西贝)		电视剧《那小子真帅》插曲
明天过后	August 27, 2008	电视剧《美女不坏》片尾曲
哭砂	January 21, 2010	电视剧《再过把瘾》主题曲
我的青春在飞腾	June 2011	电视剧《我的青春在延安》主题曲
突然想爱你		电视剧《猛兽列车》片尾曲
今生今世		电视剧《一不小心爱上你》插曲
剑心	June 28, 2014	电视剧《古剑奇谭》主题曲
听	September 11, 2014	电视剧《美人制造》插曲
浩瀚	December 2, 2014	电视剧《神雕侠侣》主题曲
My Sunshine	December 23, 2014	电视剧《何以笙箫默》主题曲
真相	July 5, 2015	电视剧《盗墓笔记》主题曲
I See The Light	July 5, 2015	电视剧《盗墓笔记》主题曲
Everything will say goodbye	December 9, 2016	网络剧《盛势》主题曲
三生三世	January 12, 2017	电视剧《三生三世十里桃花》主题曲
星辰	April 13, 2017	电视剧《择天记》主题曲

== Music videos ==
Title	Year	Director	Album
北斗星的爱	2005	周艾瑞克	第一张
你是所有	2005	第一张	—
如果爱	2006	Jacky@Conceptx	再爱我一回
再爱我一回	2006	Jacky@Conceptx	再爱我一回
流言有一千分贝	2007	一平	—
最美的太阳/The Most Beautiful Sun	2007	张清峰	最美的太阳
花手绢	2007	田海	最美的太阳
明天过后/The Day After Tomorrow	2008	邝盛	明天过后/The Day After Tomorrow
天下	2008	邝盛	明天过后/The Day After Tomorrow
看月亮爬上来	2009	辛巨擘	穿越三部曲
穿越人海	2009	辛巨擘	穿越三部曲
何必在一起	2009	金卓	穿越三部曲
勿忘心安	2009		穿越三部曲
这，就是爱/It's love	2010	黄中平	这，就是爱
最悲歌	2010	黄中平	这，就是爱
女人到底想什么	2010	陈宏一	这，就是爱
徒手	2010	盖伦	—
最接近天堂的地方/Stand Up	2011	林锦和	最接近天堂的地方
第一夫人/The First Lady	2011	彭宥纶	最接近天堂的地方
逆战	2012	周君	—
One Chance	2012	珍妮花	—
逆态度	2013	洪钟浩	—
爱不解释/Just Love	2013	彭宥伦	爱不解释/Just Love
他不懂	2013	彭宥伦	爱不解释/Just Love
因为爱情来得不容易	2013	彭宥纶	爱不解释
一念之间(&莫文蔚)	2015		—
我想/Sound Of My Heart	2016	黄中平	我想
越爱越强	2016	陈映之	黑色勇气
会孤单	2016	彭宥伦	黑色勇气
Lost in the Stars	2016	彭宥伦	Star Trek
Give You My World	2016	彭宥伦	Allied
浮诛	2016	彭宥伦	诛仙青云志
Pretty White Lies	2018	Flipevil	Future Live
一路之下/Super Life	2018	JJ Augustav	Future Live
Jump	2018	JJ Augustav	Future Live
Perfume	2018		Future Live
无药可救/Love Thoughts	2018		Future Live
