= Shang Wenjie =

Laure Shang
- 尚雯婕
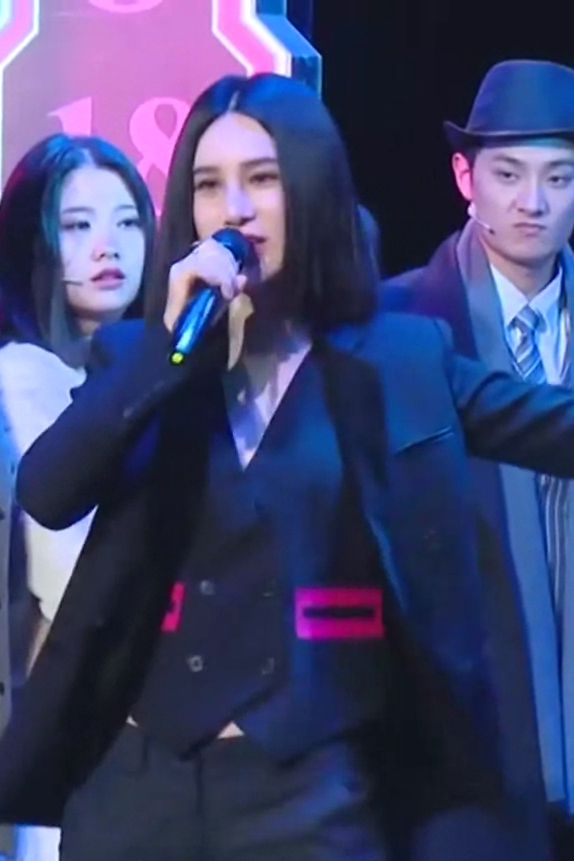
- Born: 22 December 1982 (age 43); Shanghai, China
- Occupations: Singer, Songwriter, Actress, Entrepreneur
- Years active: 2006–present
- Musical career
- Genres: Mandopop, dance, French pop, pop, folk, EDM
- Labels: EE-Media (2006); Huayi Brothers Music (2006–2013)
- Website: Official Blog

Shang Wenjie (Chinese: 尚雯婕; pinyin: Shàng Wénjié, born on December 22, 1982 in Shanghai, China), also known as Laure Shang, is a Chinese singer, songwriter, actress and entrepreneur. She won the third season of the Chinese singing competition Super Girl as well as many awards.

== Early life ==
Shang has wanted to be a singer since childhood. However, her father encouraged her to study hard and go to college. In 1998, after graduating from Junior High School, Shang was admitted to Jincai Middle School, from which she graduated with excellent grades in 2001. She was admitted to Fudan University with a major in French.

As a member of her school's literature and arts committee, she organized and participated in various singing competitions, performances and screenplay adaptations, learned to play various instruments and also to sing. In 2002, Laure Shang represented her university at the National College Student French Song Contest in Wuhan and won second place. The French Embassy in China rewarded her with a round-trip ticket for a vacation in France.

While in school, she not only won a national scholarship, but also founded the Wenjie French-Chinese Language Training Service Center and applied for the College Student Science and Technology Entrepreneurship Fund. During her studies, she completed an internship at Ouest-France French newspaper and participated in the French film specials of the Shanghai International Film Festival. In April 2005, she even acted as the main translator for the Film Festival.

== Career ==
After graduating from university in 2005, Laure Shang worked for a French company in Shanghai's Xuhui district. She speaks French, English and Spanish and was appointed assistant to the managing director just four months later.

In the spring of 2006, after unsuccessful attempts in Hangzhou and Chengdu in Guangzhou, Shang won second place in the regional competitions for Hunan Television's music show Super Girl and reached the national final in Changsha. After an intense competition, Laure Shang defeated favorite Tan Weiwei with 5.19 million votes and signed with Tianyu Entertainment.

In September 2009, the romantic comedy If You Are The One premiered in France. The song Quand Je Me Regarde, composed and sung by Laure Shang, received more than four million searches in Europe. Shang also received an invitation to collaborate with French musician Laurent Voulzy and Belgian musician Jean-Francois Maljean.

At the invitation of the Belgian government, she performed for the King of Belgium at the World's Exposition in Shanghai in 2010. The song Our Song, composed and sung by her and Jean-Francois Maljean, was named the best song at the World's Exposition and has been downloaded more than 150 million times from the fair's official website. In October, Shang attended the 40th anniversary celebrations of Sino-Canadian relations at the invitation of the Canadian government. Canadian Prime Minister Stephen Harper personally invited her to his office to talk about China-Canada relations.

On January 30, 2011, she attended the Chinese New Year Gala in the United States and later the Five Continents Spring Festival Gala in Montreal, Ottawa and Toronto, Canada. At the Spring Festival Gala in China, she sang the song J'y Crois Encore with Belgian-Canadian singer Lara Fabian. In September, she wrote the theme song Amazing Life for the One Young World Summit, which was held in Zurich, Switzerland.

In January 2013, Laure Shang appeared on the music show I Am A Singer. On April 25, she attended the state banquet of French President Francois Hollande's visit to China, was an ambassador for Sino-French cultural exchange, and sang several French songs. In May, she was a judge on the music show Super Boys and discovered Hua Chenyu.

In the same year, Shang and her friend and business partner Nie Xieyuan founded their own music studio. On April 24, 2014, BG Talent was formed. The company specializes in creating and developing talented young artists in China, such as Li Geyang, Huo Minghao, Zeng Shunxi, Chen Jingke, Li Zhenning, Shi Mingze, Wang Nanjun and Dimash Kudaibergen.

In April 2017, she took part in the fifth season of the music show Singer, singing together with Kazakh singer Dimash Kudaibergen.

On 19 March 2018, she took part in the opening ceremony of the Sino-French Film Week and was awarded Honorary Ambassador for Sino-French Cultural Exchange. In April, she was also appointed head of the Literature and Arts Department of the China International Culture Exchange Center. In September, she attended the Mid-Autumn Festival Gala in Sydney and sang the song Trouble Is A Friend with Australian singer Lenka.

Between 2018 and 2022, she appeared on the music show Everlasting Classics four times. In July 2019, she also took part in the second season of Super Vocal, and in March 2021 she appeared on the music shows The Treasured Voice and The Flash Band.

=== Today ===
In the spring and summer of 2024, Shang participated in the fifth season of the music show Ride The Wind. She sang the songs Move Your Body, Shouldn't, Hot Winter, Virtual, Time Boils The Rain, Heart Beating 808, Reflection Of Life, Wrapped Up Tight, This Is Me, Chandelier and Love. She performed Reflection Of Life with French singer Joyce Jonathan, with whom she released the song Let Light Meet Light on June 28. It contains both Chinese and French lines and celebrates the 60th anniversary of Sino-French relations.

In 2025, Laure Shang will perform at various music festivals within China.

== Discography ==
=== Albums and EPs ===
- (6 June 2007) À la claire fontaine (梦之浮桥) (EP)
- (22 October 2007) Beneath Van Gogh's Starry Sky (在梵高的星空下)
- (25 December 2007) About Us (关于我们) (Cover Album)
- (10 October 2009) Time Lady (时代女性)
- (18 November 2010) Fashion Icon (全球风靡)
- (24 January 2011) Nightmare (魔)
- (28 August 2011) IN
- (22 August 2012) Ode To The Doom (最後的讚歌)
- (7 November 2013) Graceland (恩賜之地)
- (5 December 2016) Black & Golden (黑金)
- (24 August 2018) The Puzzle Pieces
- (24 August 2020) Chanting Verses (咏) (EP)
- (31 August 2023) Mind Uploading 0.1 (意識上傳中… 0.1：覺醒) (EP)
- (13 October 2023) Mind Uploading 0.2 (意識上傳中… 0.2：虹荒) (EP)
- (27 December 2023) Mind Uploading 0.3 (意識上傳中… 0.3：神游) (EP)

=== Other albums ===
- (21 December 2010) Ma Puce (Mini Remix Album)
- (21 December 2011) w in win (Demo Album)
- (20 July 2012) Before The Doom (Bonus EP)
- (12 September 2016) Black & Golden. Pure (Instrumental Album)
- (10 January 2017) The Black Remix (Remix Album)
- (February 2017) The Golden Collection (The Best of Album)

=== Concert ===
- (2008) Share (尚佳分享演唱会)
- (2009) Sound Of Nature (天籁倾城上海交响音乐会)
- (2009) iLady (三色艾雷迪巡回演唱会)
- (2012) Atypical L!ve (异类王国巴黎音乐会)

=== Book ===
- Walk With Dream: Laure at France (与梦平行-小三儿在法兰西)

=== Translation ===
- La petite fille de Monsieur Linh (林先生的小孙女)
