= Liu Xijun =

Chinese pop singer (born 1988)

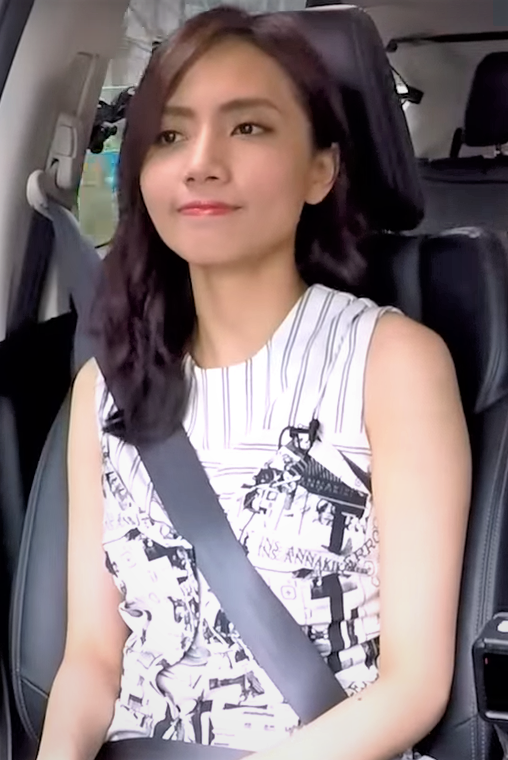
- Liu in 2018

Background information
- Also known as: Sara
- Born: 刘惜君; April 30, 1988 (age 37); Shenzhen, Guangdong, China
- Origin: Meizhou, Guangdong
- Genres: Mandopop
- Occupation: Singer
- Years active: 2005–present
- Labels: EE-Media (2009–present)
- Website: blog.sina.com.cn/xijun430

Sara Liu Xijun (simplified Chinese: 刘惜君; traditional Chinese: 劉惜君; pinyin: Líu Xījūn; Jyutping: Lau4 Sik1 Gwan1; born 30 April 1988) is a Chinese pop singer who rose to fame through televised singing competitions. Liu was born in Shenzhen, Guangdong province to a Hakka family and began as a singer by ranking fifth in the fourth season (2009) of a singing contest in China, Super Girls (Chinese: 快乐女声), or Happy Girl.

== Career life ==
- In 2009, Liu Xijun decided to take part in the famous Hunan TV show Super Girl, but she failed to rank with the Hunan TV Super Girl nationwide top 3. Her musical experience is listed below.
- Personal experience:
- In 2003, Liu Xijun started to show her shining talent: she was awarded as a top 10 school singer in a Shenzhen shatoujiao school singing competition.
- In February 2004, when the little Xijun was only fifteen years old, she won the championship of a local famous singing competition, which was hosted by Shenzhen Aoqi Music Inc, and then was signed by this music company.

=== Super Girl ===
- In March 2009, she attended a TV show hosted by Zhejiang TV, representing Shenzhen City. Liu Xijun joined the Super Girl 2009 competition. Her goal was to be in the top 20 in Guangdong Province and top 300 nationwide. She became one of the top 60 nationwide on June 13, 2009. With her outstanding talent, she later ranked with the top 20 nationwide.
- On June 26, 2009, Liu Xijun beat Zeng Yike by just one vote at Super Girl national competition and became the third Super Girl top 10 competitor.
- On July 17, 2009, she competed with Yu Kewei to be the cover girl for the fashion magazine Elle.
- On July 24, 2009, Liu Xijun was ranked fourth in Round 2 of the Super Girl National final competition.
- On August 1, 2009, she was voted fourth in Round 3 of the Super Girl National final competition; advancing past Tan Lina to become one of the nationwide top 7.
- On August 8, 2009, Liu Xijun sang "Sky", and moved all the judges and brought them to their feet; however, she failed to become Elle cover girl that week.
- On August 15, 2009, she beat Tan Lina in the final PK and became one of the top 5 finalists at Super Girl.
- On August 22, 2009, Liu Xijun together with Yu Haomin, sang the classical song "Embrace" and high acclaim from the judges and the audience.

Unfortunately, Liu Xijun lost her challenge to Yu Kewei with her song "I Only Care for You".

Name	Song	Origin	Outcome
Guangzhou elimination competition	《崇拜》	Fish Leong	Safe
Guangzhou elimination competition	《那些花儿》	Pu Shu / Christine Fan	Safe
Guangzhou elimination competition	《把耳朵叫醒》	Jin Haixin	Safe
Guangzhou elimination competition 30/50	《下一个天亮》	Guo Jing	Safe
Guangzhou elimination competition 20/30	《伤痕》	Lin Ylian	Safe
National elimination competition 60/300	《到不了》	Christine Fan	Safe
National elimination competition 20/60	《我期待》	Zhang Yusheng	Safe
National elimination competition 20/60	《疯子》	Xu Peizhe	Safe
National elimination competition 10/18	《暧昧》	Hou Xiangting	Safe
National elimination competition 10/18	《爱笑的眼睛》	Vivian Hsu	Safe
National elimination competition 7/10 round 1	《祝福》	Sally Yeh	Through
National elimination competition 7/10 round 1	《下一个天亮》	Guo Jing	Through
National elimination competition 7/10 round 2	《南海姑娘》	Teresa Teng	Through
National elimination competition 7/10 round 2	《怎样》	Dai Peini	Through
National elimination competition 7/10 round 3	《万水千山总是情》	Wang Minggui	Safe
National elimination competition 7/10 round 3	《大海》	Zhang Yusheng	Safe
National elimination competition 6/7	《野百合也有春天》	Michelle Pan	Safe
National elimination competition 6/7	《天空》	Faye Wong	Safe
National elimination competition 6/7	《等你爱我》	Chen Ming	Safe
National elimination competition 5/6	《亲爱的小孩》	Su Rui	Safe
National elimination competition 5/6	《Think of Me》	Emmy Rossum	Safe
National elimination competition 5/6	《Zai shui yi fang》	Teresa Teng	Safe
National elimination competition 4/5	《深情相拥》	Winnie Hsin & Leslie Cheung	Eliminated
National elimination competition 4/5	《牵手》	Su Rui	Eliminated
National elimination competition 4/5	《枉凝眉》	Chen Li	Eliminated

=== Musical style ===
Liu Xijun has high personal music recognition accuracy in terms of her voice, therefore, people can easily distinguish her voice by listening to her songs. Liu Xijun's musical style could be categorized as classical pop music, such as Deng Lijun, she owned nearly all the characters which Chinese traditional singers have had. Even though her songs still have her own features, taking "Love Garden" for instance, this song is standard pop music, depicting a tale of a girl's first love. Having experienced Super Girl 2009 as her precious fortune, Liu Xijun improved her singing skills greatly when she signed with EEMEDIA after Super Girl, and started her new music career.

== Discography ==
=== Albums and EPs (extended plays) ===
Album type	Album information	Track listing
1st EP	Sara: Released: December 1, 2007; Label: AO Music	Track listing: 1. Windbell Ring (贝壳风铃); 2. Shouldn't Miss Me -Cantonese Version- (不必再怀念我-粤语版-); 3. A Night at Shenzhen (深圳之夜)
2nd EP	Sara's Sky (君临天下): Released: July 1, 2008; Label: AO Music	Track listing: 1. Happy World (欢乐世界); 2. Sara's Sky (君临天下); 3. Love Heart (心有爱，人有情); 4. Happy World -Children Version- (欢乐世界 -儿童版-)
1st Studio	The Love Garden (爱情花园): Released: February 11, 2010; Label: AO Music	Track listing: 1. Proclamation of Girl (少女宣言); 2. First Love (初恋); 3. The Love Garden (爱情花园); 4. I Like Free; 5. I Am Happy (我很快乐); 6. Wind of the Bell Chimes (贝壳风铃); 7. Yellow Tree (绿树变黄); 8. Moon Ship (月亮船); 9. Wing of Dreams (梦的翅膀); 10. Happy Embracement (幸福的拥抱); 11. Yellow Tree -Piano Version- (绿树变黄-钢琴版-)
2nd Studio	Morning (拂晓): Released: May 25, 2011; Label: Liyin International	Track listing: 1. Morning (拂晓); 2. Time That was Myself (那时候的我); 3. Travel (旅途); 4. Magnanimity (大气); 5. How Sing a Love Song with Love (怎么唱情歌); 6. Love Song of the Winds (恋风之歌); 7. Fleeting (飞逝的); 8. Previous Slow Moment (太晚以前); 9. Having You Here (有你在身边); 10. Rose Pictures Gallery (蔷薇映画馆); 11. The Rhododendron Flower Blooms Again (羊角花又开)
3rd Studio	Cherish· Jun (惜·君): Released: December 15, 2012; Label: Liyin International	Track listing: 1. How could I say it? (你怎么说); 2. Just like his tenderness (恰似你的温柔); 3. I only care about you (我只在乎你); 4. Little Nanhai (南海姑娘); 5. Star (星); 6. Forget him (忘记他); 7. A night in Hong Kong (香港之夜); 8. A walk by the path of life (漫步人生路); 9. Tubular rose (夜来香); 10. Come again (何日君再来)
4th Studio	When everything around was empty (當我身邊空無一人): Released: November 13, 2015; Label: Asia Muse Entertainment	Track listing: 1. We'll go later (後來我們會怎樣); 2. Too... (來); 3. The memory of the fishes (魚的記憶); 4. Light (光); 5. Even now (就算了嗎); 6. I love my life (我愛我存在); 7. Completely idiot (多傻); 8. London 1801 (倫敦1801); 9. Forget that ghost village (莫忘空城); 10. Your hands (你的手) written by Benson Taylor
5th studio	I Like it (如我): Released: December 29, 2017; Label: Ocean Butterflies	Track listing: 1. Love Surfing (浪裡遊); 2. Milky Way Dream (夢銀河); 3. RU WO (如我); 4. From My Heart (說完); 5. But I Know (你忘的我忘了); 6. Hypnosia (嗜睡症); 7. Night Walk (夜行); 8. The Same Thing (同一件事); 9. Secret (秘密); 10. Time To Forget (該忘了)
3rd EP	Hard shell beauty (硬地之美): Released: September 4, 2019; Label: Ocean Butterflies	Track listing: 1. Yeah! (假如); 2. Endless (无尽); 3. Long night (长夜)

=== Singles ===
1. The Highest of All (高高至上) February 27, 2010
2. The Rhododendron Flower Blooms Again (羊角花又开) August 12, 2010

==== Promotional songs ====
Year	Song
2005	Free Bird; QQ正传; 高高至上; 快乐为你
2007	冬季; Free bird; Crazy summer
2008	Just one night; 爱你的人; Love Garden
2009	退出
2010	高高至上; 羊角花又开
2011	怎么唱情歌; 拂晓
