= Ji Dandi =

- Born: Ji Minjia 紀敏佳 (traditional) 纪敏佳 (simplified); Jì Mǐnjīa (Mandarin); June 30, 1982 (age 44); Chengdu, Sichuan, China
- Occupation: Singer
- Years active: 2005–present

Chinese name
- Traditional Chinese: 紀丹迪
- Simplified Chinese: 纪丹迪
Transcriptions
Standard Mandarin
- Hanyu Pinyin: Jì Dāndí
- Musical career
- Also known as: Maria; Amelia
- Genre: Mandopop

Ji Dandi (simplified Chinese: 纪丹迪; traditional Chinese: 紀丹迪; pinyin: Jì Dāndí; born June 30, 1982), formerly known as Ji Minjia (simplified Chinese: 纪敏佳; traditional Chinese: 紀敏佳; pinyin: Jì Mǐnjīa), is a Chinese singer from the city of Chengdu, Sichuan.

In the TV show Super Girl, season 2004, Ji finished fourth in the Chengdu qualification round. In the following 2005 season, she finished first in the Hangzhou qualification round and fifth overall in the national results. Since then, Ji has attained international recognition. She produced the title song for the Japanese anime series Galaxy Railways. On December 29, 2015, she changed her name from Ji Minjia to Ji Dandi.
