= Hunan Broadcasting System =

Chinese state-owned television network

- Native name: 湖南广播影视集团有限公司 湖南广播电视台
- Company type: State media
- Industry: Media and Entertainment
- Founded: 28 June 2010; 15 years ago
- Headquarters: Changsha, Hunan and Xining, Qinghai, China
- Area served: China and abroad
- Key people: Ouyang Changlin, Zhang Huali
- Owner: Government of Hunan
- Subsidiaries: Mango TV
- Website: www.hunantv.com

Hunan Broadcasting System (HBS) (Chinese: 湖南广播电视台; pinyin: Húnán Guǎngbò Diànshìtái), formerly known as Golden Eagle Broadcasting System (GBS), is China's second biggest state-owned television network after China Media Group (CMG). The television network is owned by the Hunan provincial government. The network is based in Changsha in Hunan and Xining in Qinghai. On 20 May 2009, the television network expanded its service to Hong Kong and North America.

== History ==
Hunan Broadcasting System first aired on 29 September 1970 as a local television station in Changsha, Hunan province, China. It expanded its network through nationwide satellite television on 1 January 1997.

Hunan Broadcasting System's nationwide channel Hunan Television created Happy Camp, one of China's first variety shows. Happy Camp remained as China's highest-rated TV show, until its ratings were overtaken in 2008 by Jiangsu TV's If You Are the One. Hunan TV was also known for launching national singing contests Super Girl and Super Boy fashioned after the British series Pop Idol. Hunan TV also aired many highly rated dramas including Palace and Scarlet Heart.

Hunan Broadcasting System took a 49% stake in Qinghai TV in 2009, increasing the number of satellite channels in its roster.

Hunan TV is currently China's second most-watched channel, second only to CCTV-1, owned by China Central Television.

== Assets ==
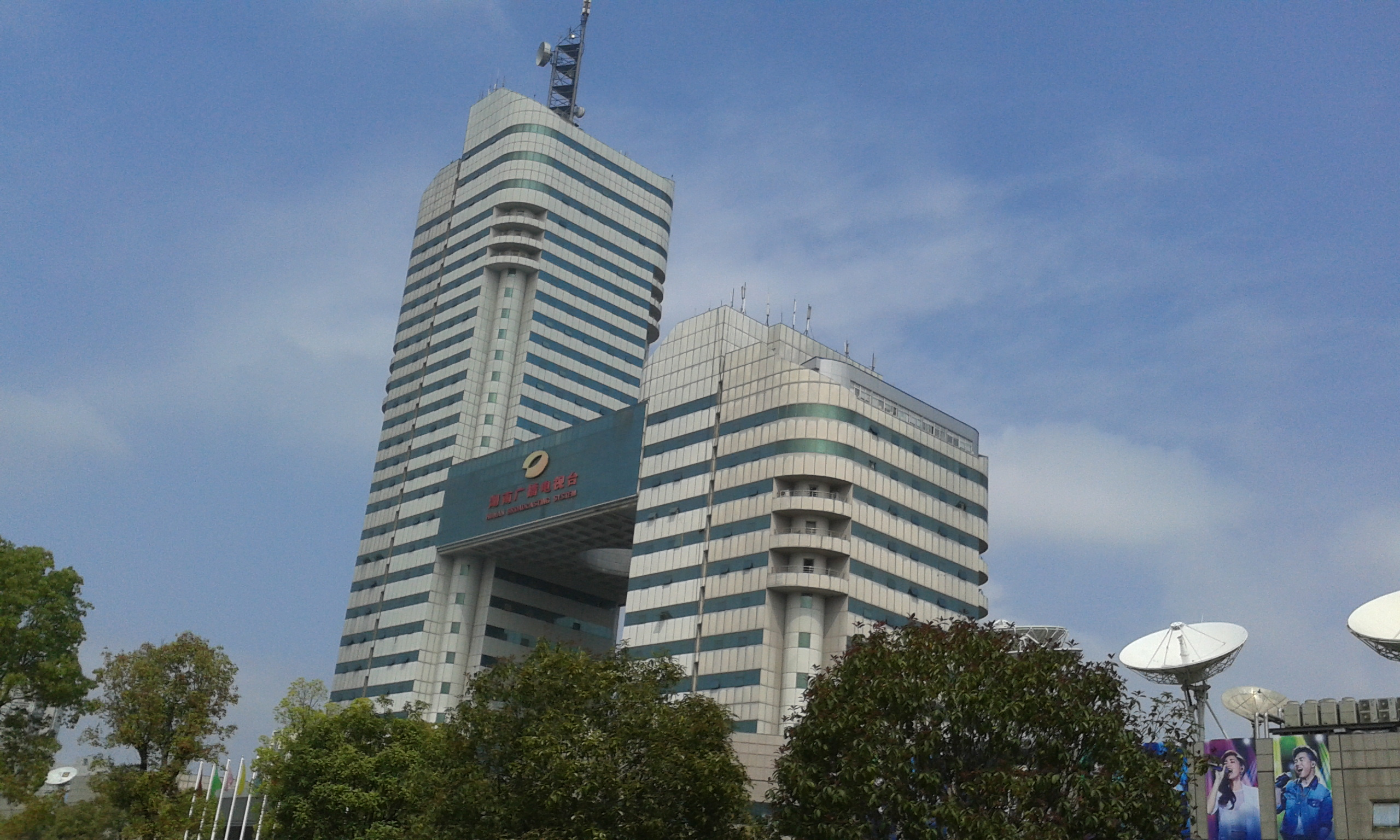
Headquarters of Hunan Broadcasting System

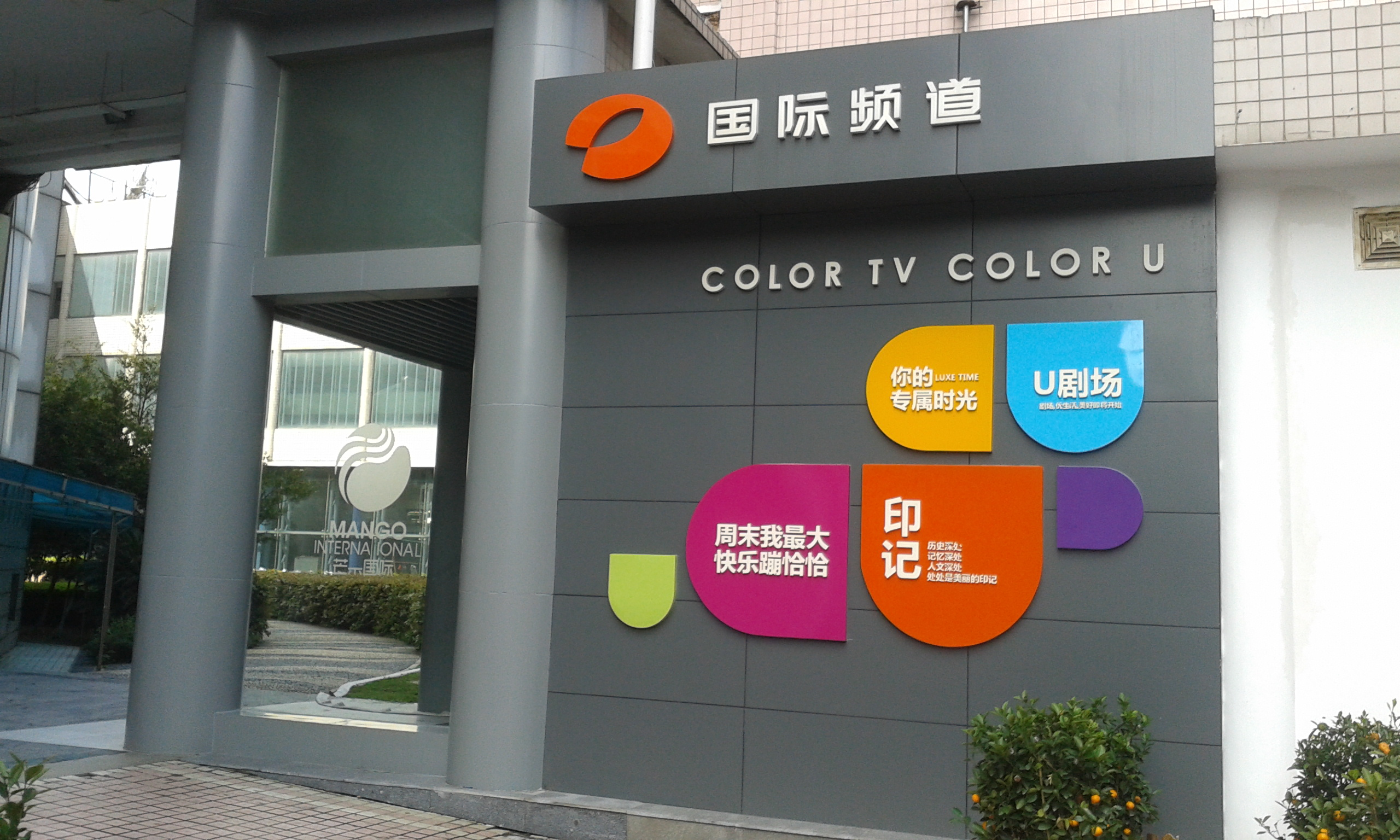
Office of Hunan Television World

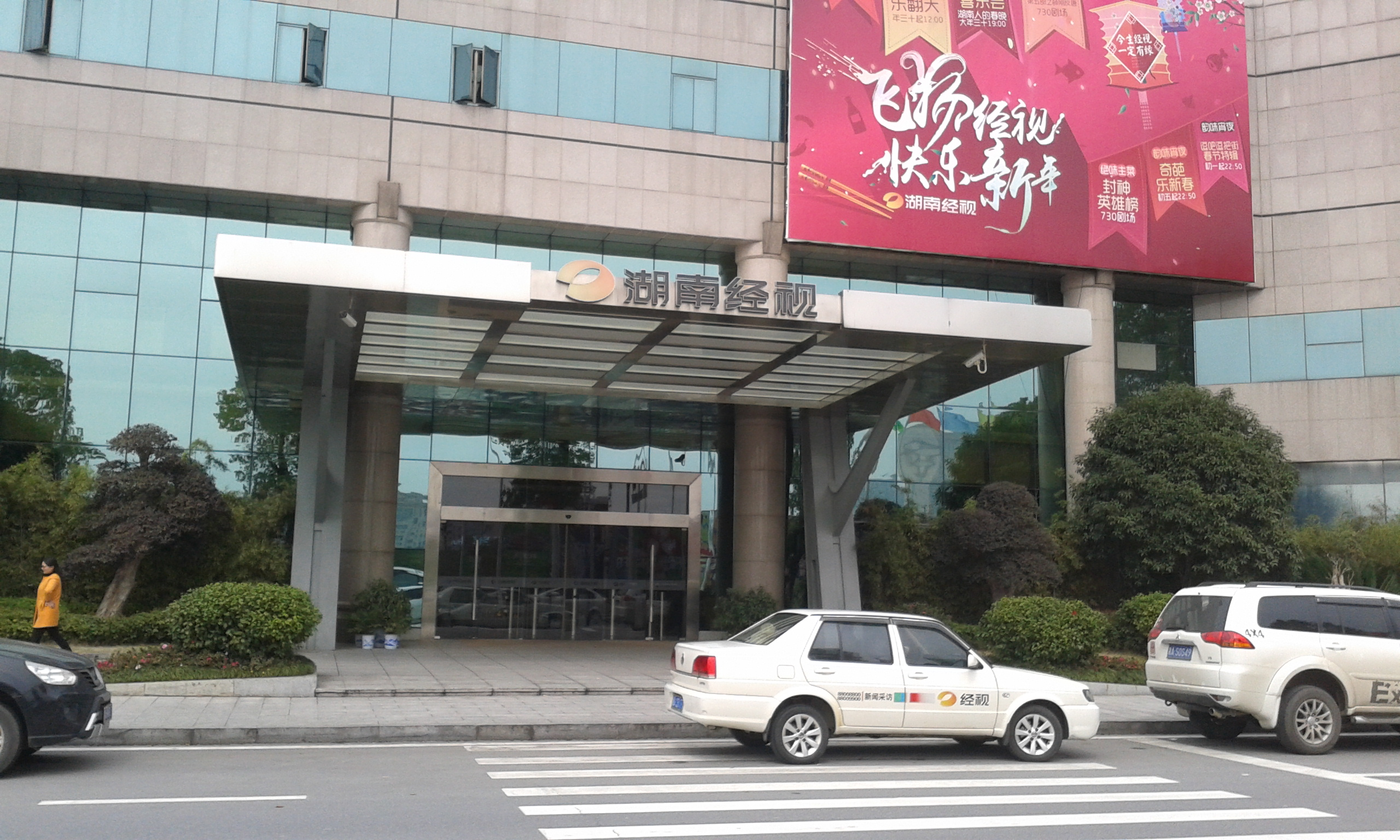
Office of Hunan eTV

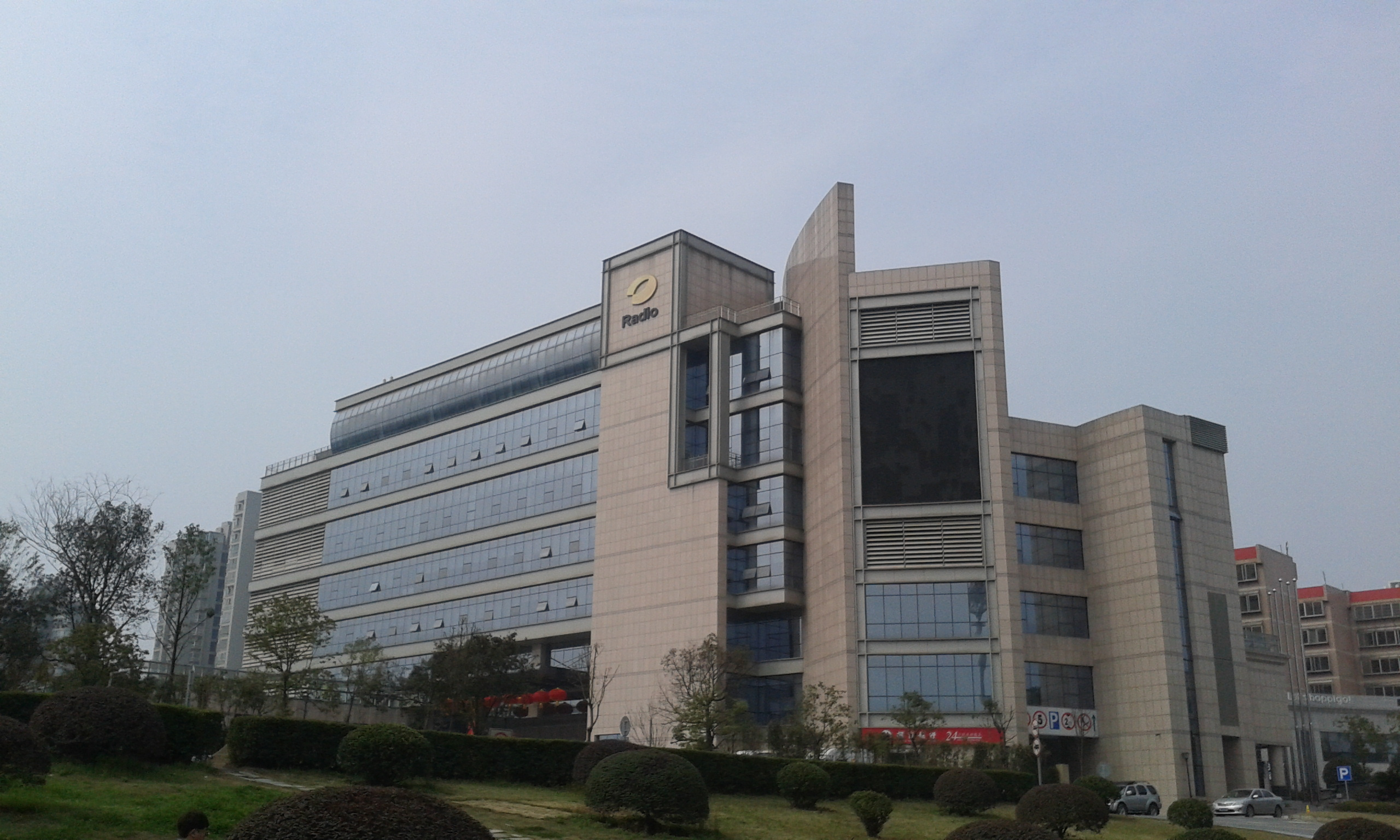
Headquarters of HBS Radio

=== TV channels ===
Channel	Channel content	Format	Launch Date
Hunan TV	main Standard Chinese channel (free-to-air in Hunan only)	HDTV&SDTV	29 September 1970
Economic	economic channel	HDTV&SDTV	1 January 1996
City	city channel	HDTV&SDTV	
Drama	drama channel	HDTV&SDTV	
Movie	movie channel	HDTV&SDTV	
Aiwan	aged channel	HDTV&SDTV	
Show	entertainment channel	HDTV&SDTV	
Golden Eagle Documentary	documentary channel	HDTV&SDTV	
Aniworld	cartoon channel	HDTV&SDTV	30 October 2004
HNTV World	international Standard Chinese channel	HDTV&SDTV	20 May 2009

Online TV:

- Mango Television
- Qinghai Television (Qinghai TV, national broadcast, 49% owned by HBS)
- Happigo (Pay digital channel)
- Happy Fishing (Pay digital channel)
- Channel Tea (Pay digital channel)
- Table Tennis & Badminton Channel (Pay digital channel)

Radio Frequencies (Provincial broadcasts only):

- Hunan News Radio (on MW 738, on FM 102.8, 93.0, 88.0, 93.7 etc., on SW 4990) (Frequencies on FM may vary in different cities)
- Hunan Economic Radio (on MW 900, on FM 90.1, 91.0, 95.7, 94.6 etc.) (Frequencies on FM may vary in different cities)
- Hunan Fine Arts Radio (on FM 97.5, 87,5, 90.8, 95.7) (Frequencies on FM may vary in different cities)
- Hunan Traffic Radio (on FM 91.8, 100.3, 102.6,102.0,89.5) (Frequencies on FM may vary in different cities)
- Hunan Travel Radio (on FM 106.9, 90.6)
- Green 938 (on FM 93.8, 100.7)
- Super 893 (on FM 89.3, 89.8, 102.1)
- Golden Eagle 955 (on FM 95.5, 100.5, 91.3)

Other assets:

- Mango Excellent Media
  - Hunantv.com Corporation
  - EE-Media
  - Happigo Co., Ltd.
- Jin Yin Bao
- Mango Pictorial
- Xiaoxiang Films
- Mango Films
- Shineshow Media
- Genstone International

== Production ==
Hunan Broadcasting System has broadcast notable programming such as Super Girl, often referred to as the Chinese version of the United Kingdom's Pop Idol. As of 2008, it is airing the Chinese version of Strictly Come Dancing, a co-production with TVB.

=== Hunan TV ===
- Happy Camp
- Day Day Up
- Super Girl
- Super Boy
- Strictly Come Dancing - Chinese version (co-production with TVB)
- Meteor Shower
- Bai Ke Quan Shuo
- Wo Men Yue Hui Ba
- Gelivable Sunday

=== Qinghai TV ===
- Blossoming Flowers
