= Li Xiaoyun =

- 李霄云
- Born: 16 March 1987 (age 39); Lanzhou, Gansu, China
- Occupation: Singer-songwriter
- Years active: 2009–present
- Awards: Super Girl; 2009 runner-up
- Musical career
- Also known as: Michelle Li
- Genres: Mandopop
- Instruments: Guitar, piano, harmonica, violin, electronic organ, drums
- Label: EE-Media (2009–present)

Chinese name
- Traditional Chinese: 李霄雲
- Simplified Chinese: 李霄云
- Hanyu Pinyin: Lǐ Xiāoyún
- Website: Official Blog; Video Club

Li Xiaoyun (Chinese: 李霄云; born 16 March 1987), also known as Michelle Li, is a Chinese-born Australian singer. She is the runner-up in the 2009 Super Girl contest, and currently studies at the University of Melbourne.

== Early life ==
Li grew up in a working family in Lanzhou, Gansu. At the age of 15, she moved to Melbourne with her mother, who runs a hot-pot restaurant. Li attended Blackburn High School and studied at the University of Melbourne.

Li likes sports and used to be the captain of the school basketball team when she was in Lanzhou No.7 Middle School in China.

== Musical talent ==
In her early age, Li inherited the talent for music from her father, who liked to play music in his spare time. Li's own journey in the world of music started with an old guitar given by her father. She was also influenced by pop stars and musicians such as Wang Leehom, Jeff Chang, David Tao and Jay Chow.

Though never receiving any professional training, Li can play guitar and piano. Her guitar skill even won professional appreciation.

Li likes to write her own songs. Her first piece came out in primary school. A song she wrote about her deceased father impressed many.

When Li was about to apply for the University of Melbourne, she was told that her father had been diagnosed with cancer. She held on upon the news until she was admitted by the university, and chose to suspend the schooling for a year to look after her father in China.

The song "Strength given by my father" was finished beside her dying father with a guitar. The lyric is about a girl talking cozily with her beloved and long-separated father. She assured him that she would carry on in the future with the strength he had passed to her.

== Albums ==
Album name	Intro	Track listing
Cover Girls 封面女生; 1st Compilation	Cooperated by the Top 10 of Super Girl in 2009: Released:August 27, 2009; Label:EE-Media	Track listing: 1. 沉淀; 2. 唱得响亮 (2009)
ALL BLUE 你看到的我是蓝色的; 1st Studio	This album had collected 10 songs, 7 of them were written by herself: Released: July 7, 2010; Label: EE-Media	Track listing: 1. 你看到的我是蓝色的 (All Blue); 2. 习惯 (Habit); 3. 爸爸给的坚强; 4. 被剧终的音符; 5. 灯 (Lamp); 6. 我没那么狠心; 7. 微笑练习 (Try to Smile); 8. 沉淀 (remix); 9. 你不在的时候; 10. 我为谁而来
