= Super Girl (TV series) =

Chinese television music competition

- Logo
- Also known as: Super Voice Girls
- 超级女声 (2004-2006); Chāojí Nǚshēng 快乐女声 (2009-2011); Kuàilè Nǚshēng
- Genre: Interactive reality game show
- Created by: Liao Ke
- Country of origin: China
- Original language: Mandarin
- No. of seasons: 5

Production
- Production locations: Changsha, Hunan (1–5); Chengdu, Sichuan (1–5); Guangzhou, Guangdong(2–5); Hangzhou, Zhejiang (2–5); Nanjing, Jiangsu (1,4); Shenyang, Liaoning (3–5); Wuhan, Hubei (1,4); Xi'an, Shaanxi (5); Zhengzhou, Henan (2–4); Numbers indicate the season(s) in which a competition was held there.

Original release
- Network: Hunan Satellite Television
- Release: May 6, 2004 – September 16, 2011

Related
- Super Boy; Blossoming Flowers

Super Girl or Super Voice Girls (simplified Chinese: 超级女声; traditional Chinese: 超級女聲; pinyin: Chāojí Nǚshēng; literally: "Super Female Voice", as it is homonym with "Super girl") was a Chinese singing contest for female contestants, organized by Hunan Satellite Television between 2004 and 2006. The show's official name was Mengniu Yoghurt Super Girl Contest until 2009; later it was known as BBK Music Phone Super Girl Contest, after the company that sponsored the series. It was generally described as the unofficial mainland Chinese version of the global television franchise Pop Idol (2001) and became one of the most popular entertainment shows in the country. Despite Super Girl's major popularity and success, the show was heavily criticised by Liu Zhongde, a member of the Chinese People's Political Consultative Conference. He essentially claimed Super Girl was poison for the youth.

The program was relaunched in 2009. The Chinese title was changed to Happy Girls (快乐女声; 快樂女聲; Kuàilè Nǚshēng) though the official English title remains unchanged as Super Girl. In 2011, the Chinese government banned Super Girl from airing, claiming the program to be too long. The State Administration of Radio, Film and Television (SARFT) told the Hunan station that Super Girl broke time rules for this kind of show. They should be no more than 90 minutes long, but episodes of Super Girl can last more than three hours. More than 2.5 billion people watched the show.

Huanan announced a third incarnation of the show on October 30, 2015. Auditions for the series closed on April 16, 2016.

== Outline ==
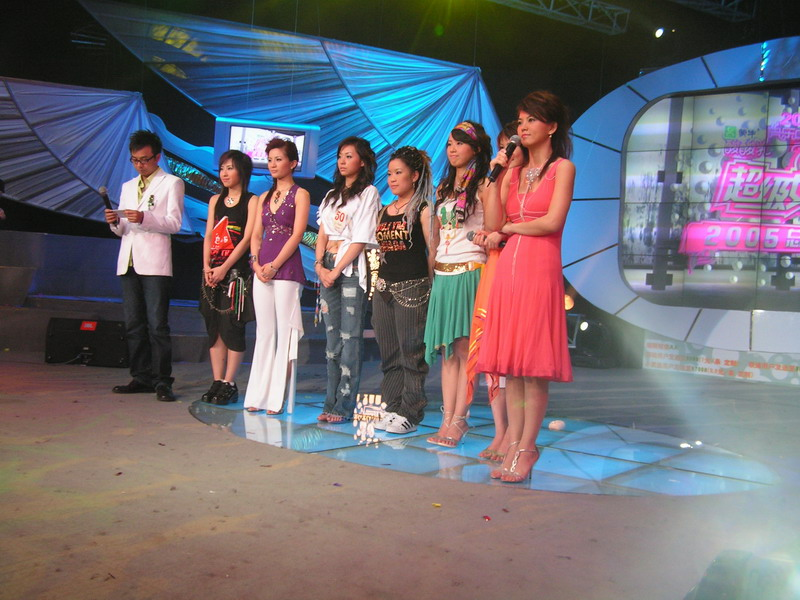
Six finalists during a 2005 national round event in Changsha, Hunan. From right to left: host Li Xiang, contestants Lin Shuang, She Manni, Yi Hui, Zhang Liangying, Guo Huimin, Li Na, and host Wang Han.

Partly inspired by the many spinoffs of the UK show Pop Idol, the competition was open to any female contestant regardless of her origin, appearance, or how she sings. The almost unrestricted audition sessions drew contestants of ages ranging from 4 to 89 years old. The 2005 season attracted more than 120,000 applicants during the preliminary selection rounds, held in the five provinces of Hunan, Sichuan, Guangdong, Henan and Zhejiang. Many applicants travelled long distances to take part in the competition hoping to become a star. Each contestant was allowed 30 seconds to perform in front of judges and find out if they were selected for the preliminary regional rounds. To prevent another overwhelming audition season, a minimum age of eighteen was later set during the 2006 season.

Following the selection of contestants in the five regions, the competition began with the preliminary rounds. Preliminaries were held in each of the five locations where auditions were located. Television viewers were able to watch each of the preliminaries and vote for their favorite singers. Voting was conducted by telephone and text messaging.

The regional preliminaries were followed by a weekly broadcast knockout competition held in Changsha, Hunan province. Viewers called in to vote for their favourite singers, and the weakest two—as voted by the judges and the audience's weekly SMS— faced-off subsequently in a PK, short for Player Kill. The term is derived from kill-or-be-killed multiplayer online games. The singer with the fewest votes was then eliminated. Unlike Pop Idol, the last event was contested between the final three, rather than the final two contestants.

Unlike American Idol, judges for the competition were selected from different backgrounds in society, but they were all still Chinese. A few dozen "audience judges" were selected in addition to several professional judges.

== History ==
The original version of the show was known as Super Boy, and aired in 2003 on Hunan Entertainment Channel, a local broadcaster based in Changsha, Hunan province in South Central China. The show was a success and its counterpart, Super Girl, aired at the beginning of 2004 with the slogan, "Sing as you want, sing out loud," and became the most viewed show in Hunan. However, the programme's impact was limited as the channel does not broadcast outside the province.

On 6 May 2004, Super Girl was introduced to a national audience by its producer Liao Ke through Hunan Satellite Television. In addition to broadcasting the original episodes created by Hunan Entertainment Channel, the network also developed this show in other 3 cities: Wuhan in Hubei province, Nanjing in Jiangsu province, and Chengduin Sichuan province. This show attracted an average of 10,000 contestants in each city and received nationwide attention.

Hunan Satellite Television introduced a second season of Super Girl on 19 March 2005. The preliminary rounds were filmed in five cities: Changsha in Hunan province, Guangzhou in Guangdong province, Zhengzhou in Henan province, Hangzhou in Zhejiang province, and Chengdu in Sichuan province. By the middle of the season, the competition captivated a nationwide audience and became one of the most watched television entertainment shows in mainland China with tens of millions of viewers.

== Cultural impact ==
=== Positive impact ===
The final episode of the 2005 season was one of the most popular shows in Chinese broadcast history, drawing over 400 million viewers, more than the China Central Television New Year's Gala earlier that year. The final peaked at 280 million viewers at a given time, dwarfing the 12-million-viewer figure for the finals of Pop Idol. Despite the show being condemned by China Central Television as being "vulgar and manipulative", a third season of the show was launched and finished in early October 2006.

On January 18, 2006, China National Philatelic Corporation released a postage stamp issue featuring 2005 winner Li Yuchun. The set was released ahead of Li's 22nd birthday in her commemoration.

Some who were not chosen as winners have also been able to enter the recording industry through other means. Ji Minjia, who ranked 5th overall in the 2005 contest, worked in Los Angeles in 2006 to help with production of the title song for Japanese anime series The Galaxy Railways. On March 15, 2007, Japanese recording group Hello! Project announced Li Chun, one of the top 50 contestants in the 2006 Changsha regional, as one of two new members of Chinese ancestry of its pop group Morning Musume. On May 11, 2009, Zhang Liangying—who ranked 3rd overall in the 2005 competition—made her American television debut on an episode of The Oprah Winfrey Show.

The contest has also inspired television producers to create other talent search shows, including ones based on American shows such as The Apprentice.

The show was the feature of a 2007 documentary titled Super, Girls!, produced and directed by independent Chinese filmmaker Jian Yi during the 2006 contest season and released at the Cambridge Film Festival. An ARTiSIMPLE Studio production, Super, Girls! is the only independent feature-length documentary ever made about the "Super Girls".

=== Democratic expression ===
One of the main factors contributing to the show's popularity was that viewers are able to participate in the judging process by sending text messages with their mobile phones to vote for their favorite contestants. During the 2005 regional contest in Chengdu alone, 307,071 message votes were cast for the top three contestants, each vote costing 0.5 to 3 yuan. This was, according to Jim Yardley of International Herald Tribune, considered as one of the largest "democratic" voting exercises in mainland China.

Over 800 million text messages were sent during the third season of Super Girl, and fan clubs began to appear throughout the country.

While some culture and media experts praised Super Girl in blazing "a trail for cultural democracy" and breaking elitism in China's entertainment industry, others were quick in pointing out that the show represented a superficiality in society, "propelled by behind-the-scenes manipulation and state-of-the-art pomp and circumstance".

=== Criticism ===
Liu Zhongde of the Chinese People's Political Consultative Conference criticised both the show and its negative influence on society, saying the audience watches the program under a distorted mentality and in an unhealthy condition. He claimed that the government departments oversee culture and art, and they should not permit something like Super Girl to exist. He admitted it was the choice of the market while claiming it as low culture. He said it was not as bad as the 1983 Anti-Spiritual Pollution Campaign, but the elements are there: cultural invasion, suspicion of market forces, spiritual health, preservation of national culture, and allegations of popular entertainment spreading corruption among the youth, all facing off against a new concept of socialist morality.

In the end of 2011, China's State Administration of Radio, Film and Television (SARFT) has suspended the show from future production. While the official reason for such decision is the fact that the show exceeded its airing time throughout the season, many believe that the moral issue was behind this act. This claim is reinforced by Hunan TV news spokesman, Li Hao, who admitted the network will incorporate more "positive" content in its 2012 programs.

== Economic impact ==
Mengniu Milk Group reportedly paid ¥14 million to Hunan Television for rights to sponsor the show's broadcast outside Hunan province beginning with the 2005 season. According to one of China's leading thinktanks, the 2005 contest was estimated to have drawn in a total of ¥766 million (US$95.75 million). Indirect business impact of the competition was estimated at several billion yuan.

Television advertisement slots cost an average of ¥33,400 for 15 seconds in 2006, compared to the average of ¥28,000 in 2005. Advertising sales were expected to reach ¥200 million (US$25 million), nearly double that of the previous year.

== Season summary ==
Season	Premiere Date	Champion	1st Runner Up	2nd Runner-up	Final's Contestants
2004 Super Girl	6 May 2004	Angela An Youqi (安又琪)	Katy Wang Ti (王媞)	Baby Zhang Hanyun (张含韵)	1. Angela An Youqi (安又琪); 2. Katy Wang Ti (王媞); 3. Baby Zhang Hanyun (张含韵); 4. Strings; 5. Jenne Sun Yibo (孙一卜)
2005 Super Girl	19 March 2005	Chris Lee Yuchun (李宇春)	Bibi Zhou (周笔畅)	Jane Zhang Liangying (张靓颖)	1. Chris Lee Yuchun (李宇春); 2. Bibi Zhou (周笔畅); 3. Jane Zhang Liangying (张靓颖); 4. Angelica He Hejie (何洁); 5. Ji Minjia (纪敏佳); 6. Huang Yali (黄雅莉); 7. Ye Yiqian (叶一茜); 8. Bobo Yi Hui (易慧); 9. Amanda Zhao Jingyi (赵静怡); 10. Yoyo Zhu Yan (朱妍)
2006 Super Girl	2 April 2006	Laure Shang Wenjie (尚雯婕)	Sitar Tan Weiwei (谭维维)	Jeno Liu Liyang (刘力扬)	1. Laure Shang Wenjie (尚雯婕); 2. Sitar Tan Weiwei (谭维维); 3. Jeno Liu Liyang (刘力扬); 4. Amoa Ai Mengmeng (艾梦萌); 5. Li Na (厉娜); 6. Xu Fei (许飞); 7. Figo Han Zhenzhen (韩真真); 8. Reborn (蔡莹莹); 9. SuBar Tang Xiao (唐笑); 10. Shinelee Yang Lei (阳蕾)
2009 Super Girl	1 May 2009	Vivi Jiang Yingrong (江映蓉)	Michelle Li Xiaoyun (李霄云)	Huang Ying (黄英)	1. Vivi Jiang Yingrong (江映蓉); 2. Michelle Li Xiaoyun (李霄云); 3. Huang Ying (黄英); 4. Yisa Yu Kewei (郁可唯); 5. Sara Liu Xijun (刘惜君); 6. Renata Tan Lina (谈莉娜); 7. Pan Chen Miss Underwater (潘辰); 8. Pan Hongyue (潘虹樾); 9. Yico Zeng Yike (曾轶可); 10. Mocika Li Yuanxi (李媛希)
2011 Super Girl	1 April 2011	Jeremy Duan Linxi (段林希)	Cici Hong Chen (洪辰)	Moraynia Liu Xin (刘忻)	1. Jeremy Duan Linxi (段林希); 2. Cici Hong Chen (洪辰); 3. Moraynia Liu Xin (刘忻); 4. Su Miaoling (苏妙玲); 5. Yang Yang (杨洋); 6. Danny Lisi Danni (李斯丹妮); 7. Wang Yijie (王艺洁); 8. Mini Fu Mengni (付梦妮); 9. Kelly Yu Jiali (喻佳丽); 10. Change Lu Yi (陆翊); 11. DL; 12. Kim Jin Yinling (金银玲); 13. Sun Xinxin (孙昕欣)

== 2004 season ==
The first season of Super Girl aired from May 6 to September 22, 2004. Although the winners of the competition were not promised recording contracts, the top three winners signed such deals.

=== Qualifications ===
Region	1st place	2nd place	3rd place
Chengdu	Wang Ti 王媞	Zhang Hanyun 张含韵	Yin Tingting 尹婷婷
Nanjing	An Youqi 安又琪	Zhang Yue 张玥	Liu Ning 刘宁
Wuhan	Sun Yipu 孙一卜	Chen Wenya 陈文娅	Guo Juan 郭娟
Changsha	Strings	Yang Yang 杨暘	Zhang Chen 张琛

=== Final contest ===
1. Angela An Youqi (安又琪)
2. Katy Wang Ti (王媞)
3. Baby Zhang (Kristy Zhang Hanyun) (张含韵)
4. Strings
5. Jenne Sun Yibo (孙一卜)

== 2005 season ==
The final three contestants of the 2005 Super Girl competition. From left to right: Bibi Zhou, Li Yuchun, and Zhang Liangying.

The second season of Super Girl aired from March 19 to August 26, 2005. The announcement of Li Yuchun as the season's grand champion came under scrutiny as she had been leading voting results despite having the weakest voice among the top finalists. Despite the heavy criticism that arose during the competition season, the three 2005 finalists have been considered the most successful singers from the entire show.

=== Qualifications ===
Region	1st place		2nd place		3rd place	
Region	Contestant	Votes	Contestant	Votes	Contestant	Votes
Guangzhou; March 19 – May 6	Bibi Zhou 周笔畅	113,535	Yi Hui 易慧	67,310	Li Na 李娜	56,383
Changsha; April 2 – May 20	Zhao Jingyi 赵静怡	106,967	Huang Yali 黄雅莉	87,118	She Manni 佘曼妮	77,115
Zhengzhou; May 1 – June 10	Zhu Yan 朱妍	524,595	Song Lin 宋琳	473,327	Guo Huimin 郭慧敏	470,841
Chengdu; May 21 – July 1	Li Yuchun 李宇春	206,564	Zhang Liangying 张靓颖	58,172	He Jie 何洁	42,335
Hangzhou; May 22 – July 8	Ji Minjia 纪敏佳	37,385	Ye Yiqian 叶一茜	36,736	Lin Shuang 林爽	26,835

=== Final contest (July 15 – August 26) ===
No.	Name	Chinese Name	Rank	Vote of Final 3
08	Chris Lee (Li Yuchun)	李宇春	1	3,528,308 votes
07	Bibi Zhou	周笔畅	2	3,270,840 votes
01	Jane Zhang Liangying	张靓颖	3	1,353,906 votes
02	Angelica He Heji	何洁	4
04	Ji Minjia	纪敏佳	5
10	Huang Yali	黄雅莉	6
06	Ye Yiqian	叶一茜	7
03	Bobo Yi Hui	易慧	8
09	Amanda Zhao Jingyi	赵静怡	9
05	Yoyo Zhu Yan	朱妍	10

== 2006 season ==
The third season of Super Girl aired from April 2 to September 30, 2006. Shang Wenjie's selection as grand champion over Tan Weiwei, who is a professional vocalist from Sichuan Conservatory of Music, raised questions over each candidate's public appeal. Speculations arose that Shang, who appeared to be a copycat of Li Yuchun's image (somewhat androgynous), was voted grand champion due to the appeal of her Cinderella story.

=== Qualifications ===
Region	1st place		2nd place		3rd place	
Region	Contestant	Votes	Contestant	Votes	Contestant	Votes
Changsha	Li Na 厉娜	152,133	Zhang Yafei 张亚飞	137,925	Xu Fei 许飞	137,031
Hangzhou	Reborn	131,948	Tang Xiao 唐笑	113,721	Zhang Yan 张焱	46,661
Chengdu	Tan Weiwei 谭维维	241,593	Zhao Yuanyuan 赵媛媛	156,621	Yang Lei 阳蕾	80,586
Shenyang	Ai Mengmeng 艾梦萌	237,478	Zhang Chuge 张楚格	169,714	Gong He 巩贺	156,951
Guangzhou	Liu Liyang 刘力扬	359,808	Shang Wenjie 尚雯婕	142,803	Han Zhenzhen 韩真真	110,102

=== Final contest ===
No.	Name	Chinese Name	Rank	Vote of Final 2
06	Laure Shang Wenjie	尚雯婕	1	5,196,975 votes
04	Sitar Tan Weiwei	谭维维	2	4,818,125 votes
08	Jade Liu Liyang	刘力扬	3
03	Amoa Ai Mengmeng	艾梦萌	4
05	Li Na	厉娜	5
07	Xu Fei	许飞	6
01	Figo Han Zhenzhen	韩真真	7
02	Reborn	Reborn	8
09	SuBar (Tang Xiao)	唐笑	9
10	Shinelee Yang Lei	阳蕾	10

== 2009 season ==
E Media CEO Long Danni stated that through this competition, in addition to singers, the judges would also be looking for budding actresses and those that excel in other areas. Some of the Super Boys would also be co-hosts for the regional contests of Super Girls. The finale took place in August.

=== Regional contest ===
National Top 20 Qualifications

Qualified Eliminated

Region	1st place	2nd place	3rd place	4th place	5th place
Regional singing division
Chengdu 成都	Jiang Yingrong 江映蓉	Huang Ying 黄英	Yu Kewei 郁可唯	Pan Hongyue 潘虹樾	Tang Ning 唐宁
Changsha 长沙	Li Yuanxi 李媛希	Yang Yang 杨洋	Xia Wenjing 夏文婧	Gu Wei 谷微	Lu Feifei 陆霏霏
Shenyang 沈阳	Zeng Yike 曾轶可	Peng Jing 彭靖	Wang Feixue 王飞雪	Gong He 巩贺	Zhang Jiaoyang 张娇阳
Guangzhou 广州	Liu Xijun 刘惜君	Liu Meihan 刘美含	Mo Chen 莫沉	Yi Yizi 易易紫	Zhao Naiji 赵廼吉
Xi'an 西安	Chen Huijuan 陈慧娟	Cai Meng 蔡梦	Yin Shuyi 尹姝贻	Li Xinyi 李欣一	Wang Jia 王佳
Nanjing 南京	Pan Chen 潘辰	Zhang Youfang 张佑方	Zhang Meng'er 张梦儿	Zhang Xujia 张栩嘉	王庆庆
Regional Super Girl Union division
Wuhan 武汉	Chen Siting 陈思婷	Tu Fan 涂帆	Dai Huan 代欢	Wang Mingfen 王明芬	Xu Zihan 徐梓涵
Zhengzhou 郑州	Gong Mei 贡米	He Mengjie 何梦洁	Sun Yanan 孙亚男	Zhao Ying 赵莹	Zhang Ge 张歌
Hangzhou 杭州	Yao Yao 姚遥	Guan Ying 关嬴	Li Fangting 李方丁	Jie Huiqing 解惠清	Zhu Yanjin 朱彦瑾
Kunming 昆明	Ruan Zhaochen 阮兆辰	He Qiuxiang 和秋香	Wang Meng 王蒙	Geng Wei 耿薇	Zhang Weijia 张玮珈
Guiyang 贵阳	Shen Dandan 沈丹丹	Hu Xinyue 胡鑫玥	Zhou Yiling 周翊翎	Chen Jieyi 陈洁艺	Zhang Yifei 张奕菲
Nanning 南宁	Tan Nina 谈莉娜	Zhang Yixiao 张艺潇	Wei Na 韦娜	Liu Junhong 刘君虹	Xu Aili 徐爱丽
Harbin 哈尔滨	Wang Zhixin 王志心	Yang Kunzi 杨昆紫	Zhang Shanshan 张珊珊	Xu Zhenqi 徐浈祺	Yin Yu 尹玉
Taiyuan 太原	Cheng Chen 程晨	Tao Le 陶乐	Guo Jingjing 郭晶晶	Liu Huanhuan 刘欢欢	Tian Dan 田丹
Jinan 济南	Li Nini 李妮妮	Wang Meng 王梦	Xiong Jun 熊军	Cui Xue 崔雪	Lu Yangyang 路阳阳
Lanzhou 兰州	Li Xiaoyun 李霄云	Ding Liwen 丁俐文	Zhao Shanshan 赵珊珊	Wang Qiong 王琼	Li Miao 李苗
Nanchang 南昌	Wei Wei 魏薇	Zhang Yilau 张亦鎏	Nie Yuting 聂玉婷	Xie Lu 谢璐	Chen Yiling 陈一玲
Shijiazhuang 石家庄	Ding Shuang 丁爽	Yu Hongting 余虹婷	Mao Yishao 毛逸少	Zhou Shi 周诗	Jiang Yixuan 蒋亦煊
Online website division
HBS 金鹰	Big Chunzi 大春子	Liu Xin 刘欣	Hu Wiena 胡维纳	Pan Si 潘思贝	Wang Lulu 王璐璐
Tencent 腾讯	Wen Xiaorui 文筱芮	Zheng Fan 郑凡	Shao Huiming 邵慧明	Dong Zhen 董贞	Zou Chenwei 邹琛玮
Sohu 搜狐	Chen Yilu 陈艺露	Li Nasha 李娜莎	Yang Mei 杨媚	Wang Hongli 王泓漓	Ren Feiling 任飞灵
Baidu 百度	Ren Xi 任曦	Chen Lusha 陈露莎	Chen Zitong 陈姿彤	Xiao Yige 肖翊歌	Hu Jiayi 胡艺佳
NetEase 网易	Wei Jiayi 魏佳艺	Lei Yue 雷悦	Hu Qiwen 胡绮雯	Liu Haoting 刘浩婷	Dong Hanyi 董涵宜
SINA 新浪	Yang Zi 杨梓	Luo Zhenhuan 罗震环	Zhang Na 张娜	Pei Tingting 裴婷婷	Sun Jing'er 孙靖儿
resurrection	Huang Sisi 黄思思	Huang Caiqi 黄偲骐	Wu Qin 吴琴	Xian Fan 冼璠	None

=== Final Contest ===
Final Contest (Top 10)									Top 20		
No.	10 > 7A July 17	10 > 7B July 24	10 > 7C July 31	07 > 06 August 7	06 > 05 August 14	05 > 04 August 21	04 > 03 August 28	03 > 01 September 4	No.	18 > 15 June 26	15 > 10 July 3
1	Yu Kewei 郁可唯	Jiang Yingrong 江映蓉	Huang Ying 黄英	Li Xiaoyun 李霄云	Li Xiaoyun 李霄云	Jiang Yingrong 江映蓉	Jiang Yingrong 江映蓉	Jiang Yingrong 江映蓉	11	Big Chunzi 大春子	Big Chunzi 大春子
2	Li Xiaoyun 李霄云	Yu Kewei 郁可唯	Jiang Yingrong 江映蓉	Jiang Yingrong 江映蓉	Liu Xijun 刘惜君	Huang Ying 黄英	Li Xiaoyun 李霄云	Li Xiaoyun 李霄云	12	Wang Zhixin 王志心	Wang Zhixin 王志心
3	Liu Xijun 刘惜君	Pan Chen 潘辰	Liu Xijun 刘惜君	Huang Ying 黄英	Yu Kewei 郁可唯	Li Xiaoyun 李霄云	Huang Ying 黄英	Huang Ying 黄英	13	Yang Zi 杨梓	Yang Zi 杨梓
4	Jiang Yingrong 江映蓉	Liu Xijun 刘惜君	Yu Kewei 郁可唯	Liu Xijun 刘惜君	Huang Ying 黄英	Yu Kewei 郁可唯	Yu Kewei 郁可唯		14	Cheng Chen 程晨	Cheng Chen 程晨
5	Pan Hongyue 潘虹樾	Pan Hongyue 潘虹樾	Pan Chen 潘辰	Tan Lina 谈莉娜	Jiang Yingrong 江映蓉	Liu Xijun 刘惜君			15	Liu Meihan 刘美含	Liu Meihan 刘美含
6	Zeng Yike 曾轶可	Li Xiaoyun 李霄云	Li Xiaoyun 李霄云	Yu Kewei 郁可唯	Tan Lina 谈莉娜				16	Zhang Youfang 张佑方	
7	Tan Lina 谈莉娜	Tan Lina 谈莉娜	Tan Lina 谈莉娜	Pan Chen 潘辰					17	Mo Chen 莫沉	
8	Li Yuanxi 李媛希	Huang Ying 黄英	Pan Hongyue 潘虹樾						18	Tao Le 陶乐	
9	Huang Ying 黄英	Li Yuanxi 李媛希	Zeng Yike 曾轶可						19	Zhang Meng'er 张梦儿	
10	Pan Chen 潘辰	Zeng Yike 曾轶可	Li Yuanxi 李媛希						20	Tang Ning 唐宁	

Champion
ELLE cover girl
Challenges succeed to switch rank
Eliminated
Retired

=== Overall Final contest total votes ===
No.	Name	Chinese Name	Final Rank	Baidu Total Votes	QQ Total Votes	HunanTV Round 8 Votes
09	Vivi Jiang Yingrong	江映蓉	01	9,943,286	35,663,697	2,824,792
10	Michelle Li Xiaoyun	李霄云	02	25,961,752	128,312,229	2,556,524
04	Huang Ying	黄英	03	16,446,250	33,785,263	2,573,292
03	Yisa Yu Kewei	郁可唯	04	13,293,308	87,094,268
06	Sara Liu Xijun	刘惜君	05	28,371,302	177,643,033
07	Renata Tan Lina	谈莉娜	06	3,313,036	17,477,356
05	Pan Chen (Miss Underwater)	潘辰	07	5,997,042	11,799,637
02	Yoyo Pan Hongyue	潘虹樾	08	2,992,362	4,702,493
01	Yico Zeng Yike	曾轶可	09	12,671,476	178,594,458
08	Mocika Li Yuanxi	李媛希	10	5,678,316	49,872,937

== 2011 season ==
The 2011 season was won by Jeremy Duan Linxi from Yunnan. The runner-up was Cici Hong Chen.

== See also ==
- Hunan Satellite Television
- Idol (franchise)
- Super, Girls! - Chinese documentary film about girls trying out for the Super Girl contest
- Super Boy - counterpart contest for male
- The Voice of China - Chinese singing competition
