= Duan Linxi =

Chinese singer

- Born: October 14, 1990 (age 34)
- Awards: 2011 Super Girl

Chinese name
- Simplified Chinese: 段林希
Transcriptions
Standard Mandarin
- Hanyu Pinyin: Duàn Línxī
- Musical career
- Genres: Pop

Duan Linxi (Chinese: 段林希; pinyin: Duàn Línxī; born 14 October 1990 in Baoshan, Yunnan), English name Jeremy, is a female Chinese singer, famous in China after winning the nationwide singing contest Super Girl in 2011. The same year, she released her first single, Dream Child (Chinese: 追梦的孩子; pinyin: Zhuī Mèng de Haí Zì), which is included in the album Baby Sister.
