= Vivi Jiang =

- 江映蓉
- Born: Jiang Yingrong; 1 February 1988 (age 38); Chengdu, Sichuan, China
- Occupation: Singer
- Years active: 2007–present
- Musical career
- Genre: Mandopop • EDM • Dance-pop • R&B
- Instrument: Vocals

Jiang Yingrong (Chinese: 江映蓉; pinyin: Jiāng Yìngróng; born 1 February 1988), also known as Vivi Jiang, is a Chinese singer, songwriter and composer.

She studied at Beijing Contemporary Music Academy (北京现代音乐学院) and majored in popular music. She started her career by attending several TV singing competitions and winning awards.

She is best known for winning the national singing competition Super Girl (超级女声) in 2009.

== Biography ==
Jiang was born in Chengdu, Sichuan. Her father used to be an army officer who then started his own business soon after. Her parents divorced when she was 12 years old, and she has been living with her mother since then. She dropped out of high school when she was 15 and began to study music theory in Sichuan Conservatory of Music (四川音乐学院). She often sings in a Chengdu pub named “Music House” and was mentored by music producer Chen Di (陈迪). Jiang entered Beijing Contemporary Music Academy (北京现代音乐学院) in 2006.

Jiang started her musical career in 2007. She first joined a College Students Music Festival Singing Competition and became very popular in that competition due to her outstanding performance. She later got the fourth place. She sang the theme song July (七月) for the famous movie Transfer of Love ( 《爱情呼叫转移》 ). She then joined a national singing competition Super Girl (TV series) and won the No.1 place, which made her famous in China.

She also held several concerts throughout China, including cities like Changchun, Shanghai, Wenzhou, Beijing, Nanjing and Guangzhou.

== Musical Inspiration ==
Jiang said her musical inspiration includes Britney Spears, Christina Aguilera, CoCo Lee, Elva Hsiao, Lady Gaga, Beyoncé, Pink, Michael Jackson, and Jay-Z.

== Awards ==
Year	Name	Awards
2007	Yi li College Students Music Festival (伊利全国大学生音乐节)	No. 4
2007	Yi li College Students Music Festival (伊利全国大学生音乐节)	High Potential Singer Award
2008	Jue Dui Chang Xiang(绝对唱响)	No. 8
2009	China Internet Music Festival (中国网络音乐节)	Silver Award
2009	Super Girl (TV series) (超级女声)	National Winner (No.1)
2010	Southern People Weekly(《南方人物周刊》)	Young Leader Award

== Discography ==
- Bad Angel 坏天使 (Album) (2010)
- Charming Woman 女人帮 (EP) (2011)
- Fashion Show 發生秀 (EP) (2013)
- EGO 我，不是我 (EP) (2015)
- WHY NOT? (EP) (2017)
- Instinct 10 (EP) (2019)
- Princess Charming 大码公主 (EP) (2021)
