= An Youqi =

Chinese singer

An Youqi (Angela An)
- Born: Ān Yòuqí; October 14, 1982 (age 43); Harbin, Heilongjiang, China
- Occupation: Singer
- Years active: 2004–present
- Awards: Super Girl (winner, season 1)

Chinese name
- Traditional Chinese: 安又琪
Transcriptions
Standard Mandarin
- Hanyu Pinyin: Ān Yòuqí
- Musical career
- Also known as: Angela An
- Origin: China
- Genres: Mandopop
- Instrument: Voice
- Labels: EE-Media (2004–2006); Avex China Co. Ltd. (2006–2011); Yuehua Music (2011–present)

Angela An Youqi (Chinese: 安又琪; pinyin: Ān Yòuqí; born October 14, 1982) is a Chinese singer who won the first season of Super Girl, a national singing contest, in 2004. Subsequently, she signed a recording contract and released an album which recorded sales of over one million.

== Biography ==
An was born inside a middle-class family in Harbin. When she was still a child, her family relocated to Beijing. At the age of 22, she started training to develop a career as a dancer, but some years later, she started thinking about turning into a singer. She started singing in pubs waiting for being discovered by a talent agent. When the first edition of the Super Girls contest was announced by Hunan TV, she took part in the casting. Finally, she was classified officially as a contestant for the program.

After entering the competition, she started singing in all the events related to the programme, catching instantaneously the attention both from the media and the viewers. At the end, she won the competition and started preparing her first album.

The debut album of An was released with EE Media, a record label where almost all the super girl contestants have been releasing their recordings. The sales of the album were highly successful, selling over a million of copies only in mainland China.

After the release, she started a tour around many cities of China.

The success and the popularity of the singer were on the rise, and many producers and lyricist from Taiwan and Hong Kong (from where many of the biggest stars of Chinese pop music come) were interested in her.

In 2006, she released her second album, which was released under the Taiwanese branch of the Japanese company Avex Trax. She turned into the first mainland Chinese singer to sign with a Japanese label. The second album counted with a huge production effort, with many Taiwanese producers. She made a Chinese version of the song "To be", originally sung by Ayumi Hamasaki.

After the second album, An went on a five-year hiatus. After that, she released Incanto, an EP of three songs, this time with another label, the Beijing-based Yue Hua Yu Le. For this release, she changed radically in style and image and adopted an electronic synthpop sound. One year later, she released Miss An, her third full album, on Warner Music.

== Discography ==
=== Albums ===
Album Information	Track listing
Angela: Released:December 21, 2004; Debut Album; Label:EE-Media/Hong Yi Music	Track listing: 1. 你好，周杰伦; 2. 别靠近我 (Singing Aloud); 3. 最后悔爱谁; 4. 帅哥; 5. 梦想; 6. 最幸福的孩子; 7. 哎呀; 8. 丑小鸭; 9. 爱就象微风; 10. 别靠近我 (Remix)
Talk About Love 谈情说爱: Released:February 24, 2006; Second Album; Label:Avex China Co. Ltd./Avex Taiwan	Track listing: 1. 谈情说爱 (Talk About Love); 2. 失恋的人不能听; 3. 有你陪着我 (Accompany Me); 4. 挑 5. 别管我; 6. 两点寂寞; 7. 甚么东东 (What's It?); 8. 困兽之爱; 9. 就这样吧; 10. 热恋烟火
Incanto 因瞰朵: Released:March 31, 2011; First EP; Label:Yuehua Music	Track listing: 1. 因瞰朵 (Incanto); 2. 對味; 3. 見壞就收
Miss An; MISS安: Released:March 31, 2011; Third Album; Label:Yuehua Music/Warner Music	Track listing: 1. 傘下的天空; 2. 悲催的姐妹; 3. 失戀這件小事; 4. 等你懂了; 5. 安大小姐; 6. 冒火; 7. 孤單的半音; 8. 聖誕夜; 9. 櫻桃炸彈; 10. You’re My Friend
Crazy love: Released:November 13, 2013; Second EP; Label: Yuehua Music/Warner Music	Track listing: 1. 大爱; 2. 勇敢爱; 3. 微笑面具
Brown sugar mouth: Released:May 16, 2016; Third EP; Label: Yuehua Music/Warner Music	Track listing: 1. 口红糖 (Brown sugar mouth); 2. 笑着说再见 (Smile and say goodbye); 3. 抓不到 (Captured); 4. 给陌生人的情歌 (Love song for a stranger); 5. 对的心 (From the heart)
