= Huang Ying (pop singer) =

Chinese pop singer (born 1989)

- Born: January 28, 1989 (age 36); Dazhou, Sichuan, China
- Occupation: Singer
- Years active: 2009–present

Chinese name
- Traditional Chinese: 黃英
- Simplified Chinese: 黄英
Transcriptions
Standard Mandarin
- Hanyu Pinyin: Huáng Yīng
- Musical career
- Genres: Mandopop; Crossover; Hip-Hop

Huang Ying (born January 28, 1989, in Dazhou, Sichuan) is a Chinese pop singer. She rose to prominence after her fourth-place performance in the 2009 season of the Super Girl contest, a national all-female singing competition in the People's Republic of China.

== Career ==
After getting the fourth place in the Super Girl's contest, Huang Ying, started her solo music career. She was signed to EE-Media, the Chinese record label where most Super Girl contestants are signed. Soon after that, she released "The sun", an EP which contained three tracks, being the title song, the most successful single of that release.

One year later, Huang Ying released her second EP entitled "Splendid Journey", which has got 5 songs. Since then, she started developing an ethno pop style music. Again, a promotional video was shot for the title track, which was used as first single. This EP had a similar reception to her previous work. She started appearing in promotional shows and performing in various events.

After her second EP, the singer went into a five-year hiatus, although she never wanted to leave the entertainment industry. In 2015, after a change of image, Huang Ying returned to the music scene announcing the release of her first full-length album entitled "Flying happily", that will be released under EE-Media, her record label since the start of her career.

== Discography ==
- The sun (EP) (2010)
- Splendid journey (EP) (2011)
- Flying happily (Album) (2015)
