= Yico Zeng =

Zeng Yike
- 曾轶可
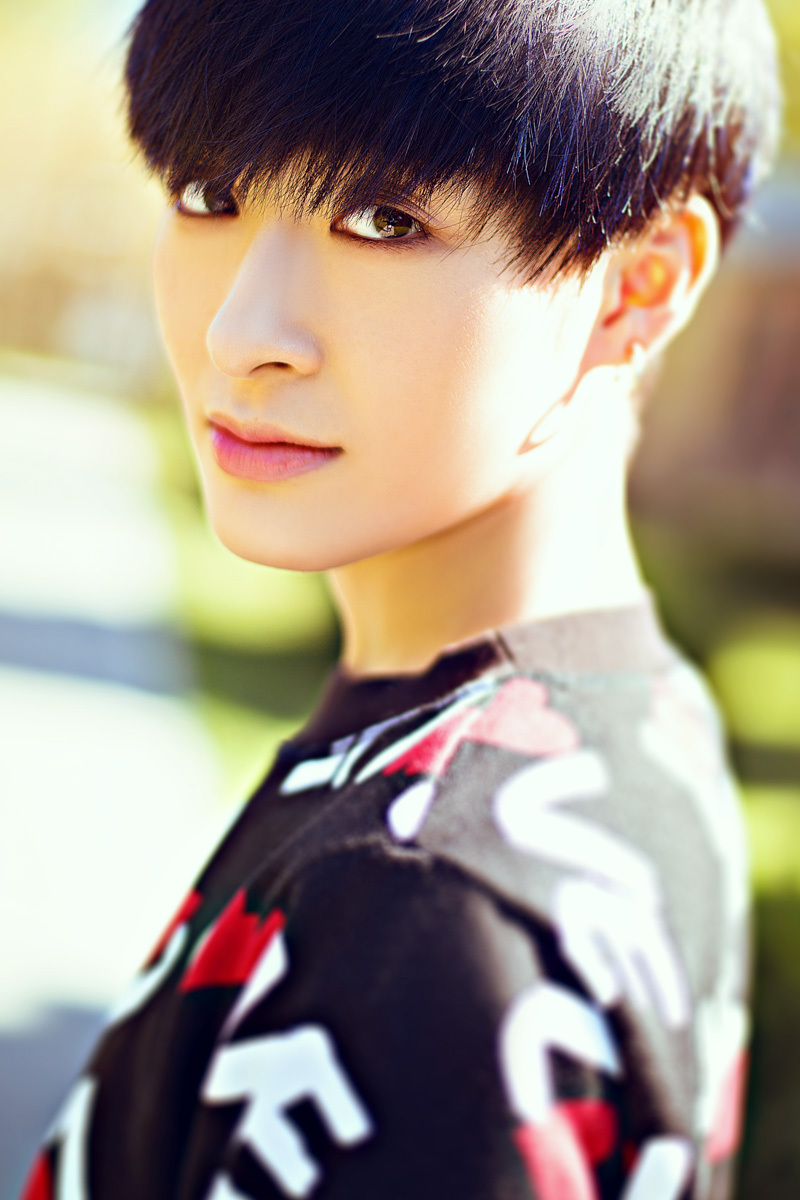
- Zeng Yike, 2015 Zeng Yike, 2015
- Pronunciation: Zēng Yìkě
- Born: 曾轶可; January 3, 1990 (age 36); Changde, Hunan, China
- Other name: Yico Tseng
- Education: Jilin International Studies University
- Occupations: Singer; songwriter; composer
- Years active: 2009–present
- Musical career
- Also known as: 轶可, 可可, 绵羊
- Genres: Mandopop
- Instruments: Vocals, guitar
- Labels: EE-Media (2009–2017); Modern Sky (2017–present)
- Website: Official weibo

Chinese name
- Traditional Chinese: 曾軼可
- Simplified Chinese: 曾轶可
Transcriptions
Standard Mandarin
- Hanyu Pinyin: Zēng Yì Kě

Zeng Yike (Chinese: 曾轶可; pinyin: Zēng Yìkě, born on 3 January 1990 in Changde, Hunan), also known as Yico Zeng or Yico Tseng, is a Chinese singer. She was a finalist on the Hunan TV talent show Super Girl in 2009. Later that year, on 18 December 2009, her first album Forever Road was released. It was suggested that a track "Leo" (Chinese: 狮子座) was similar to a song released in 2002 and she was accused of plagiarism. Zeng however denied the charge, saying all of her songs were original. In 2010 she appeared in the film Love in Disguise (Chinese: 恋爱通告).

== Early life ==
Her father was a university teacher and her mother was a doctor. She especially liked music and writing when she was a kid. The high school teacher always used her essay as a model essay in her class. She started writing songs when she was in year 9. During her high school life, she started learning guitar by herself. Although she really likes music, she hasn't received any professional training. After high school, she was about to apply to music college, but her parents opposed. Therefore, due to her excellent results in English, she applied to Jilin International Studies University to study English.

== Career ==
In 2009, she was a finalist on TV competition Super Girl and achieved 9th place in the competition. She was the only one who performed original songs during the whole competition.

On 18 December 2009, she released her first album Forever Road.

In March 2010, she joined Wang Lee Hom's movie Love in Disguise as a music school student; she also wrote and sang the theme song "Night Train".

On 10 July 2011, she released her second album A Cat's Travel - Forever 21, followed by a third one, The Flying Thief, on 20 May 2013.

In February 2013, she joined TV drama Scarlet Heart 2 as Ling Dang.

On 1 December 2014, she released a single "Stars&Moon". This was followed by singles "Black Swan", "Coward" and "Can I Kiss You" in summer of 2015.

== Singles ==
- 你是我最好的朋友 ("You are my best friend")
- 还能孩子多久 ("How long can I be a child")
- 最天使 ("My best angel")
- 狮子座 ("Leo")
- No tomorrow
- Good night
- 景 ("The scene")
- 白色秋天 ("White autumn")
- 多余的流星 ("Redundant meteor")
- The princess in another world
- 等你回来 ("Wait for you")
- 勇敢一点 ("Be brave")
- 视觉系 ("The visual"
- 我们不是只有现在吗
- 星星月亮 ("Stars&Moon")
- 黑天鹅 ("Black Swan")
- 胆小鬼 ("Coward")
- Can I Kiss You
- 别祝我生日快乐 ("Don't wish me a happy birthday")
- 北京到台北 ("Beijing to Taipei")
- 不如我们重新来过 ("Not as good as we have been")
- 午夜旅馆 ("Midnight hotel")
- 私奔 ("Elopement")
- I Need Love
- Need A Friend
- 三的颜色 ("the color of three")

== Albums ==
- (2009) Forever Road
- (2011) 一只猫的旅行 Forever 21
- (2013) 会飞的贼 Flying Thief
- (2015) 25岁的晴和雨 25-year-old Sunny and Rainy
- (2018) Anti！Yico
- (2020) 情绪禁区 Emotion Quarantine
- (2021) Burning
- (2022) 2022
- (2024) Arrogance

== Film and television works ==
=== Films ===
- Love in Disguise (2010) (恋爱通告)
- Angel's Gift (2011) (天使的礼物)
- Seer 2 (2012) (赛尔号大电影2之雷伊与迈尔斯)
- South of the Clouds (2014) (北回归线)

=== Television series ===
- Hello Summer (2011) (夏日甜心)
- Scarlet Heart 2 (2014) (步步惊情)

== Awards ==
- 2009, the most popular super girl awarded by Tianya
- 12 SEP 2009, ELLE "Best style girls"
- 2010, top Chinese Music Chart Awards- The most popular media attention new star
- 2010, Baidu Entertainment Boiling Point-The yearly top 10 hottest song for 《Leo》
- 2010, Beijing Popular Music-The yearly best creative new star
- 2010, the 14th Global Chinese List-The best new star in mainland
- 11 JAN 2010, the second music chart new festival" annual most media attention newcomer Award.
- 29 JAN 2010, 90 trendsetters list "90 Pioneer Music Award"
- 31 JAN 2010, Baidu Entertainment Boiling Point, "Leo" won "Hottest Top Ten Golden Melody Awards"
- 5 FEB 2010, in the song list Beijing Pop Music Awards "Best New Artist Creation"
- 6 MAR 2010, music pioneer "Vanguard Works new singer award" 28 MAR 2010, the global Chinese music chart "best new artist award in the Mainland"
- 24 APR 2010, Music Radio China TOP ranking the "Mainland's most promising newcomer award"
- 21 AUG 2010, the seventh king "Hit songs bang "Mainland's most promising newcomer award" and "Hit singer-songwriter King Award", "Leo" won the "Top Ten Golden Melody Awards"
- 2 SEP 2010, Chinese Golden Melody Awards 2010 ceremony, "Leo" won the "Top Ten Chinese Gold Songs Award"
- 15 APR 2011, fifteenth session of the " Global Chinese chart "won the" best stage interpretation of the nomination. "
- 25 JUN 2011, fourth China promulgated the influence of network Festival won the "Top Ten TV character"
