= He Jie =

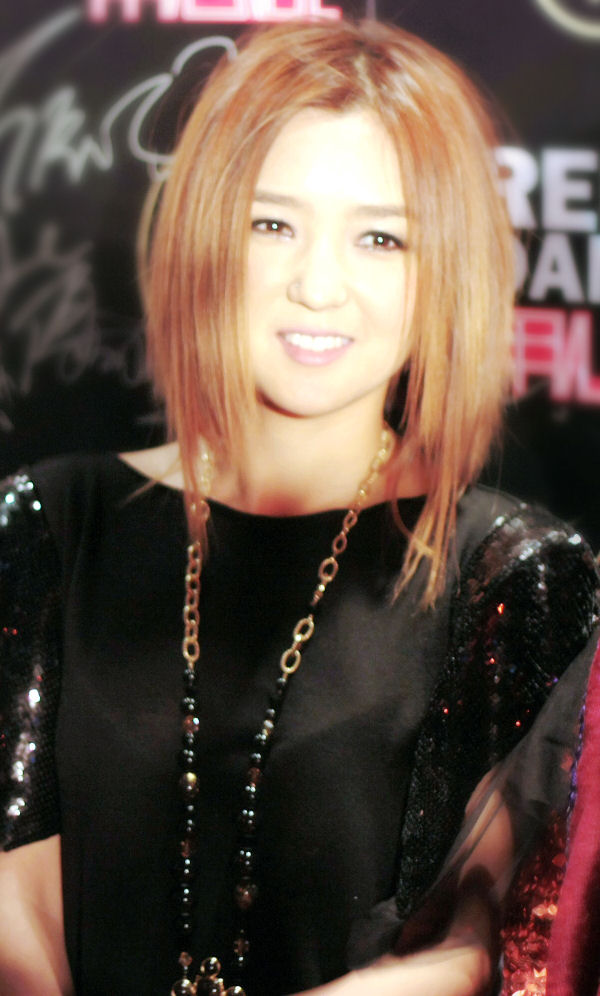
- Born: March 25, 1986 (age 40); Guiyang, Guizhou, China
- Occupation: Singer
- Years active: 2005–present
- Spouse: He Ziming (m. 2013; div. 2017)
- Children: 3

Chinese name
- Traditional Chinese: 何潔
- Simplified Chinese: 何洁
Transcriptions
Standard Mandarin
- Hanyu Pinyin: Hé Jié
- Musical career
- Origin: China
- Genre: Mandopop
- Instruments: Vocals, Piano
- Label: Avex

He Jie (simplified Chinese: 何洁; traditional Chinese: 何潔; pinyin: Hé Jié; born 25 March 1986), also known as J.HE, is a Chinese singer. She debuted her singing career by winning the fourth place at the Chinese singing contest Super Girl.

== Biography ==
=== Early life ===
He Jie was born in Guiyang, Guizhou, China. During her childhood she started loving music, and in 1999, when she was only 13 she took part in the singing contest 99 Star Challenge and won the first prize. Some years later, she participated in the Beijing TV variety show "Happy Story" representing Guizhou, her province. After these early experiences, He Jie entered the Sichuan Music Conservatory, one of the most prestigious musical institutions of China, where she was trained as a singer.

In 2004, after graduating from the conservatory, the performer took part in more singing contests, one of which was focused on songs in English, in which she, again, won the first place.

=== Music career ===
In 2005, she took part in the Chinese singing contest Super Girl, and won the fourth place at the contest. In 2006, she signed with Chinese record label EE Media, and released her debut studio album Luminary. The next year she signed with Avex Taiwan, and released her second studio album "Obviously I'm Not an Angel". This second album is known for containing a Mandarin version of Sabrina Salerno's 1980's hit "Boys Boys Boys" performed in a duet with Vision Wei.

In 2010, after three years of absence, she signed with A8 music, and released her third studio album "I Wanna Go Back". One year later, she signed with Huayi Music, and released her first extended play "The Short Love Story".

After the release of her fourth studio album "Brave to Love" in 2012, the performer started a relationship with the Actor He Zeming, with whom she married one year later. In 2014 the performer gave birth to her first child. From then on, she released various single releases until 2015, when, she published her second extended play "Double Double". That same year she gave birth to her second child a reason because of which the singer limited her musical activities to the minimum and released only single releases.

After giving birth to a third child, in 2017, He Jie divorced her husband, He Zeming after seven years of relationship. Due to the divorce, the singer suffered a strong depression that kept her away from the music studios for a year. In 2018, after recovering from her mental problems, and after three years of semi retirement, the performer returned firmly to the stage, and released her fifth full studio album, entitled "Goodbye He Jie" under the Beijing based Bai Na Entertainment, her new record label. The singer described this new release as an introspective album in which she talks about her depression and the need to say "goodbye" to the past.

In 2022 the singer went on with her music career and signed with the Chinese Brand of Sony Music. Later, she started working in her following álbum, entitled "Roots" which was released months later.

== Discography ==
=== Studio albums ===
- Hands (2005)
- Luminary (2006)
- Obviously Is Not Angel (2007)
- I Wanna Go Back (2010)
- Brave to Love (2012)
- Goodbye He Jie (2018)
- Roots (2022)

=== Extended plays ===
- The Short Love Story (2011)
- Double Double (2015)
