= EE-Media =

Chinese record label

EE-Media, Ltd. 天娱传媒有限公司
- Type: State-owned enterprises of China
- Industry: Entertainment
- Founded: 2004
- Founder: Zhang Huali
- Headquarters: Shanghai, China
- Number of locations: 4
- Area served: Mainland China and Hong Kong
- Key people: CEO/ Wang Peng (2004–2008); Long Danni (2008–2017); Zhang Yong (2008–2017); Xiao Ning (2017–2020); Shen Yadong (2020–present)
- Services: Artist management Film production Record label
- Owner: Hunan Broadcasting System
- Parent: Mango Excellent Media
- Website: eemedia.cn

EE-Media
- Genre: Mandopop
- Country of origin: China

EE-Media is a Chinese entertainment company, founded in Shanghai, China in 2004, under the parent company Hunan Broadcasting System.

== History ==
The company was created after the success of Super Girl and Super Boy, national singing contests organized by Hunan Satellite Television. Due to the success of the contests many of the contestants became idols and attracted many fans, which drew many investments for Hunan TV to create EE-Media, a subsidiary specifically to publish records and musical productions.

== Locations ==
- Shanghai - Headquarters
- Beijing
- Haikou, Hainan
- Hong Kong SAR

== Artists ==
=== Male ===
- Hua Chenyu
- Guo Jingming
- Amguulan
- Jason Zhang
- Vision Wei
- Yu Haoming
- Zhang Han
- Zhu Zixiao
- Wang Yuexin
- Su Xing
- Ji Jie
- Lu Hu
- Chai Ge
- Guo Biao
- Wang Zhengliang
- Yao Zheng
- Zhu Yan
- Zhong Zhuo
- Ping An
- Jia Hai (Henry)
- Lu Nuo
- Ou Hao
- Yin Haoyu (Patrick)

=== Female ===
- An Youqi
- Tan Weiwei
- Xu Fei
- Li Na
- Zhang Yafei
- Li Weiwei
- Tang Xiao
- Xia Ying
- Chen Xibei
- Ai Mengmeng
- Han Zhenzhen
- Hong Chen
- Tong Wejia
- Han Xiaoxiao
- Jin Wenxin
- Su Miaoling
- Cao Lu
- Yuan Yiqi

=== Group ===
- Top Combine
- Strings
- Reborn Portfolio
- I Me
- 8090

=== Super Girl 2009 ===
- Wang Zhixin
- Chang Yu-fang
- Li Xiaoyun
- Liu Xijun
- Huang Ying
- Yu Kewei
- Jiang Yingrong
- Cheng Chen
- Li Yuanxi
- Pan Chen
- Tan Lina
- Liu Meihan
- Pan Hongyue
- Yang Zi
- Big Chunzi
- Tao Le
- Mo Chen

=== Former ===
- Zeng Yike (2009-2017)
- Zheng Shuang (2009-2015)
- Li Yuchun (2005-2015)
- Yu Menglong (2013-2021)
- He Jie (2005-2010)
- Pan Chen (2009)
- Chen Chusheng (2007-2009)
- Liu Liyang (2006-2007)
- Bibi Zhou (2005)

== See also ==
- C-pop
- Super Girl
- Super Boy
