= Blossoming Flowers =

- Logo
- 花儿朵朵
- Genre: Interactive reality game show
- Created by: Liao Ke
- Country of origin: People's Republic of China
- Original language: Mandarin
- No. of seasons: 1

Production
- Production locations: Changsha, Hunan; Chengdu, Sichuan; Guangzhou, Guangdong; Hangzhou, Zhejiang; Shenyang, Liaoning; Xining, Qinghai

Original release
- Network: Qinghai Satellite Television and Hunan Satellite Television
- Release: March 30 – September 4, 2010

Related
- Super Boy; Super Girl

Blossoming Flowers (simplified Chinese: 花儿朵朵; traditional Chinese: 花兒朵朵; pinyin: Huā'er Duoduo; literally "flower baby blossoming") also known as Super Flowers Girl was an annual national Chinese singing contest for female contestants, organized by Qinghai Satellite Television between 2010. It was generally described as the Qinghai version of Super Girl and becoming another popular entertainment shows in the country. The singing contest will have air its second season in March 2011.

== Outline ==
Partly inspired by the many spinoffs of the Hunan Satellite Television's Super Girl, the competition was open to any female contestant from ages 18 through 32 regardless of her origin, appearance, or how she sings. Many applicants travelled long distances to take part in the competition hoping to become a star. Each contestant was allowed 30 seconds to perform in front of judges and find out if they were selected for the preliminary regional rounds.

Following the selection of contestants in the five regions, the competition began with the preliminary rounds. Preliminaries were held in each of the five locations where auditions were located. Television viewers were able to watch each of the preliminaries and vote for their favorite singers. Voting was conducted by telephone and text messaging.

The regional preliminaries were followed by a weekly broadcast knockout competition held in Xining, Qinghai province. Viewers called in to vote for their favourite singers, and the weakest two—as voted by the judges and the audience's weekly SMS— faced-off subsequently in a PK, short for Player Kill. The term is derived from kill-or-be-killed multiplayer online games. The singer with the fewest votes was then eliminated.

== Season summary ==
Season	Premiere Date	Champion	1st Runner Up	2nd Runner-up	Final's Contestants
2010 花儿朵朵	30 March 2010	Momo Mo Longdan (莫龙丹)	Cai Tingyu (蔡婷玉)	Villi Li Hui (李慧)	1. Momo Mo Longdan (莫龙丹); 2. Cai Tingyu (蔡婷玉); 3. Villi Li Hui (李慧); 4. Yang Xiucuo (杨秀措); 5. River Dai Yue (代悦); 6. Ma Yiru (马沂茹); 7. Lulu Li Yanglu (李杨璐); 8. Teng Siyu (滕偲玙); 9. Wendy Xie Wenting (谢文婷); 10. Lu Yudi (卢昱弟)
2011 花儿朵朵	5 May 2011	TBD	TBD	TBD	TBD

== 2010 season ==
The first season of Blossoming Flowers aired from March 21. The finale is scheduled for early-September.

Final Contest
No.	10 > 08 Jul 31	08 > 06 Aug 7	06 > 05 Aug 14	05 > 04 Aug 21	04 > 03 Aug 28	03 > 01 Sep 4
1	Mo Longdan 莫龙丹	Mo Longdan 莫龙丹	Dai Yue 代悦	Mo Longdan 莫龙丹	Cai Tingyu 蔡婷玉	Mo Longdan 莫龙丹
2	Ma Yiru 马沂茹	Ma Yiru 马沂茹	Cai Tingyu 蔡婷玉	Li Hui 李慧	Li Hui 李慧	Cai Tingyu 蔡婷玉
3	Teng Siyu 滕偲玙	Li Hui 李慧	Mo Longdan 莫龙丹	Cai Tingyu 蔡婷玉	Mo Longdan 莫龙丹	Li Hui 李慧
4	Cai Tingyu 蔡婷玉	Cai Tingyu 蔡婷玉	Yang Xiucuo 杨秀措	Yang Xiucuo 杨秀措	Yang Xiucuo 杨秀措	
5	Yang Xiucuo 杨秀措	Dai Yue 代悦	Li Hui 李慧	Dai Yue 代悦		
6	Li Hui 李慧	Yang Xiucuo 杨秀措	Ma Yiru 马沂茹			
7	Dai Yue 代悦	Li Yanglu 李杨璐				
8	Li Yanglu 李杨璐	Teng Siyu 滕偲玙				
9	Xie Wenting 谢文婷					
10	Lu Yudi 卢昱弟					

Champion
Flower girl
Eliminated

=== Final contestants ===
- 02 Momo Mo Longdan (莫龙丹) - Shenyang Area - 1st place (Champion)
- 04 Cai Tingyu (蔡婷玉) - Zhengzhou Area - 2nd place (1st Runner-up)
- 05 Villi Li Hui (李慧) - Guangzhou Area - 3rd place (2nd Runner-up)
- 09 Yang Xiucuo (杨秀措) - Xining Area - 4th place
- 07 River Dai Yue (代悦) - Chengdu Area - 5th place
- 06 Ma Yiru (马沂茹) - Online (Chongqing) Area - 6th place
- 03 Lulu Li Yanglu (李杨璐) - Xining Area - 7th place
- 10 Teng Siyu (滕偲玙) - Chengdu Area - 8th place
- 08 Wendy Xie Wenting (谢文婷) - Changsha Area - 9th place
- 01 Lu Yudi (卢昱弟) - Shenyang Area - 10th place

== See also ==
- Idol (franchise)
- Super Boy
- Super Girl
- The Voice
