= Su Miaoling =

- Born: 9 August 1991 (age 34); Zhongshan, China
- Occupation: singer-songwriter
- Years active: 2011 – present

Chinese name
Transcriptions
Standard Mandarin
- Hanyu Pinyin: Su Miaoling
Yue: Cantonese
- Jyutping: Sou1 miu6 ling4
- Musical career
- Origin: Zhongshan, Guangdong
- Genres: C-pop, Mandopop, Cantopop, Jazz
- Labels: EE-Media, Sony Music
- Website: Su Miaoling Weibo

Su Miaoling (苏妙玲; born 9 August 1991), known outside China as Smallwan Su, is a Chinese C-Pop singer who was born in Zhongshan, in the Guangdong province. She is known for taking part in the Super Girl contest produced by Hunan TV. After that, she has been pursuing a musical and acting career.

== Biography ==
=== First years ===
Su Miaoling was born in Zhongshan, in the Guangdong province on 9 August 1991. She is the youngest member of her family. During her childhood, she spent her school days in her hometown. In those years, Su started feeling interested in music, although she wasn't interested in pursuing a musical career. At first, she enjoyed her interest in music listening to the tapes of her older brother. She listened to both Cantopop and Mandopop music (The two main genres inside C-pop). She also listened to traditional folk songs, although her favourite singer and her main influence, has always been the Taiwanese megastar A-mei.

Although she loved listening to music, she only took part once in a voice training class. Despite her lack of voice training, when she listened to music, she started developing her own singing skills. From then on, she started developing her own musical style and identity.

=== Career ===
In 2011, Su, took part in the Super Girl talent show, produced by Hunan TV. She went to Guangzhou in order to participate in the casting. After being finally accepted into the program, she started displaying her vocal talent. Since her first performance, Su surprised the juries by having a very different voice from the rest of the contestants. She had developed a strong, but at the same time, soft voice.

The participation of Su in this TV program, enabled Su, to find her own musical style. She started combining the mainstream C-pop with another genres like Jazz. Thanks to this distinct style, she managed to be one of the favourites of the contest. In the end, she got fourth place at the end of the show.

After her success in Super Girl, she started officially her music career. She was signed to the EE-Media, the Mainland Chinese giant record label where most of the Super Girl and Super Boy contestants are attached to. Since then, she began the production of her first Studio EP entitled "一刻" (Moment) which was released in the middle of 2012. This EP contained songs in the Mandarin and Cantonese dialects and reflected clearly the personal Jazz-influenced C-pop style developed by Su. This first EP was very successful in Mainland China.

After the satisfying reception of the album both critically and commercially, the performer started winning her first recognitions and awards.

Two years after her first album, Su, released a second EP with the title of "漫步失物招领处" (Peace lost and found), which was, this time, coproduced between her label EE-Media and Sony Music. This album was recorded also in Mandarin and Cantonese and followed the same creative direction as the first album, although this time, some electronic music influences can be found in this release.

After a four-year hiatus, in 2018, Su returned to the music scene with her third EP entitled Wan, which was released on October.

=== Acting career ===
In 2011, shortly before releasing her first album, Su Miaoling started expanding her artistic career to the filming industry. She took part in the film "曼陀罗" (Mandrake) and two years later, she starred in the film "暴躁天使" (An Irascible Angel). After that, she has also participated in some TV dramas.

== Discography ==
Album Information	Track listing
一刻 (Moment): Released: December 21, 2012; First EP; Label: EE-Media	Track listing: 1. 心路 (Motive); 2. 未完待续 (To be continued); 3. 时间肖像 (Time portrait); 4. 我是我 (I am I); 5. 妙 (Wonderful); 6. 女生的说话 (Schoolgirls speaker); 7. 一刻 (Time); 8. 天才白痴梦 (Idiot genie dreams)
漫步失物招领处 (Peace lost and found): Released: February 24, 2014; Second EP; Label: EE-Media	Track listing.: 1. 凌晨几点 (Some mornings); 2. 永远十八岁 (Eighteen years forever); 3. 眼神总会认 (The eyes always tell the truth); 4. 蓝友 (Blue friends); 5. 星期天孩子 (Children in Sunday); 6. Care free
WAN: Released: October 29, 2018; Third EP; Label: EE-Media	Track listing.: 1. 序 (Preface); 2. 无尽夏 (Endless summer); 3. 决裂 (Break); 4. 化 (Chemistry); 5. 一百万只猫 (One million cats)

== Filmography ==
=== Films ===
- 曼陀罗 (Mandrake) (2011)
- 暴躁天使 (An irascible girl) (2012)
- 天各一方 (Tian ge Yi fan) (2015)

=== TV Dramas ===
- 多少爱可以重来 (How could love be repeated?) (2015)

== Awards ==
- 2011: City ambassador of Zhongshan.
- 2011: EE-Media Music Awards: Best new singer.
- 2011: Annual Beijing Pop Music Awards: Most popular new singer.
- 2012: Pioneer Awards: Best Mainland Chinese debut album.
- 2012: Annual 101FM awards: Best song of the year for "Time portraits".
- 2012: Annual 101FM awards: Best debut album for "Moment"
- 2012: Huading Celebrity awards: 48th place.
- 2013: Eastern billboard awards: Best new singer.
