= Hong Chen =

Hong Chen 洪辰
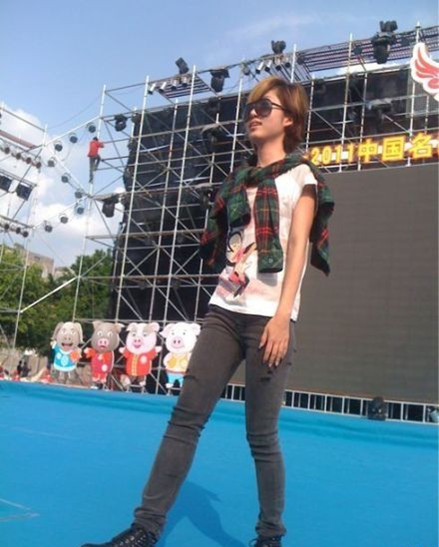

Background information
- Born: October 9, 1991 (age 34); Changzhou, Jiangsu, China
- Genres: Mandopop, Cantopop
- Occupation: Singer-songwriter
- Years active: 2011–present
- Label: EE Media

Hong Chen (Chinese: 洪辰, also known as Cici Hong) is a Chinese singer who finished as the runner-up in 2011 Super Girl television singing contest.

== Biography ==
Her first contact with music took place with an album dedicated to the victims of the Sichuan earthquake in 2008. Soon after that, she released a song for the Beijing Olympic games, called "light guardian". Two years later, she was invited as a guest singer to the "Original music of China" song contest.

Hong Chen, started definitively her career when she entered in the super girl competition. After winning the event she was signed to the label; EE Media. There, she started releasing her singles, and sung in many live events.

Her first EP, called "Fly", was released in 2012, and is being massively promoted by her record label. Shortly after the release of her EP, she started preparing her first full album "Miss72".

Unlike many singers from mainland China, who are widely known because of their peculiar image and style, like Li Yuchun or Bibi Zhou, she has developed a more average style of music combined with a colorful image.

== Discography ==
=== EP ===
- 2012: 飞 (Fly)

=== Full albums ===
- 2012: Miss72
