= Happy Camp (TV series) =

Chinese variety show

- Title screen
- Also known as: Happy Corner
- Genre: Variety show
- Created by: Ouyang Changlin
- Country of origin: China
- Original language: Mandarin
- No. of seasons: 24
- No. of episodes: >1000

Production
- Running time: 120 minutes

Original release
- Network: Hunan Broadcasting System (HBS)
- Release: 11 July 1997 – 25 September 2021

Related
- Day Day Up; Gelivable Sunday

Happy Camp
- Simplified Chinese: 快乐大本营
- Traditional Chinese: 快樂大本營
- Literal meaning: Happy Camp
Transcriptions
Standard Mandarin
- Hanyu Pinyin: Kuàilè Dàběnyíng

Happy Camp (Chinese: 快乐大本营) was a Chinese variety show produced by Hunan Broadcasting System. The show debuted on 7 July 1997, and was off air on 25 September 2021. From 2006 until its conclusion, the show was hosted by He Jiong, Li Weijia, Xie Na, Du Haitao and Wu Xin, collectively known as the Happy Family. As a group, they also produced music albums and films throughout the show's run.

A flagship show of Hunan TV, Happy Camp was also one of China's most popular shows, consistently achieving record high ratings, with a minimum active viewership of 10 millions. The show aired every Saturday, featuring celebrity guests and hosts engaging in a variety of activities, including performances, games, interviews, and parodies.

== Format ==
Each weekly episode featured several popular guest celebrities, including regional stars from Hong Kong, China, Japan, South Korea, Taiwan and Singapore. It provided a platform for celebrities to showcase their talents. Due to the show's popularity, many artists appeared to promote their latest works, such as films, books, or songs, through interviews, performances, and games.

=== Title change ===
- In 1997, when the show was first broadcast, it used a purple and blue opening title, reflecting the logo of Hunan Satellite TV.
- In 2002, the title changed to a light yellow design with "Happy Camp" on a five-color circle.
- In 2003, it was updated to an orange title with red artistic lettering.
- In November 2004, aligning with the show's "He Li" competition concept, the opening title was changed to an orange stage design.
- In July 2005, the title featured a spinning star forming "Happy," with "La La Song" as the background music.
- In 2007, the opening title became a short drama featuring He Jiong and the "Happy Family," and the English name changed to "Happy Camp."
- In 2019, the title became a castle cartoon with the Happy Family head contest.

== Hosts ==
- Li Xiang (李湘, 1997-2004)
- Li Bing (李兵, 1997 pilot episode only)
- Hai Bo (海波, 1997-1998)
- Dai Jun (戴军, 1998 guest host)
- Zhao Baole (赵保乐, 1998 guest host)
- He Jiong (何炅, 1998-2021)
- Li Weijia (李维嘉, 1999-2021)
- Xie Na (谢娜, 2005-2021)
- Du Haitao (杜海涛, 2006-2021)
- Wu Xin (吴昕, 2006-2021)

== Theme Song ==
In 1997, "Happy Like the Wind" composed by Zhang Boxu was the theme song. In 2000, it was changed to "La La Song" as the opening song. On 11 July 2021, a new theme song was released marking 24th anniversary of the series.

== Episodes ==
=== Season 1: 2007 ===
Date	Episode	Guest
17 Mar	Happy shopping, Thanksgiving Anniversary!	Annie Yi, Yu Quan, Tian Liang, Tan Weiwei, Liu Liyang, Reborn, Qin Lan
24 Mar	Lamp of Peach Blossom	Quan Yuan, Yuen Tai, He Jiong, Xie Na
31 Mar	Made in China	TANK, Shi Yang
7 Apr	We want you to look good	T. A. K. E., Kim Wan-lyo, Lee Seung-hyun, Sin Seung-hee, Jang Sung-jae, Baby Zhang, Zhao Jingwei, Ruili Magazine models (Xiao Hei, Ayuki and Wang Xiang)
14 Apr	Super Boy	Super Boy contestants
21 Apr	Super Boy	Super Boy contestants
28 Apr	I have my youth	SARA, Super Junior
5 May	Super Boy	Super Boy contestants
12 May	Super Boy	Super Boy contestants
26 May	Happy Boy	Yao Zheng, Allen Su, Wang Yuexin, Lu Huing, Bird Zhang, Jason Zhang
2 Jun	Dance Domination CD	5566, Zax Wang, Sam Wang, Tony Sun, Jason Hsu
8 Jun	Super Boy	Super Boy contestants
16 Jun	What are the feelings for	Gong Ger, Fahrenheit
23 Jun	Super College	20088 Band, Battle
30 Jun	Dream links	Qin Lan, Jeff Bao, Alex Fong Chung-Sun, Jenny Zhang
7 Jul	China Love	Mary, Bo-Yee Poon, Jin Shanshan
14 Jul	Happiness is flying towards you	Beijing Latin Dance Club, Richie Ren
21 Jul	Off it	Paul, LKG
28 Jul	Unity is strength	Buddy, Kit Teo, Hudson, Civil Imitator
4 Aug	Popular element	183 Club, Fish Leong
11 Aug	Super Star	Ham Yu, Chen Chusheng, Allen Su, Vision Wei, Ji Jie, Yao Zhen
18 Aug	Why Red (I)	Super Junior
25 Aug	Why Red (II)	Super Junior
1 Sep	Good list of young campus	Back Dorm Boys
8 Sep	Special Feature: Host Tour of Hong Kong	Andy Lau
15 Sep	Turn on the happiness	Bibi Zhou, Guangdong Migrant Group
22 Sep	Turn on the happiness	Wang Zhenglian, Ham Yu, Wang Yuexin
29 Sep	Turn on the happiness	Chris Lee
6 Oct	Fun Saturday	Hangzhou Heavenly Sword Fencing Club, Tino Bao, Anthony Bao
13 Oct	I know my taste	Yili Yogurt College Music Festival Players, Steve Yoo, Pu Shu
20 Oct	"Radiant" people	Directors: Zhong Wei, Ran Dawei, Luo Nahan
27 Oct	Dance of the young	Dance Teachers: Zhou Zhikun, Huang Rui, Jiang Luxia, Song Bin, Zuo Jing
3 Nov	Wonderful Life	Children's Gymnastics Team, Guo Tao
10 Nov	Sparkling Red Star	Jason Zhang, Ji Jie, Jinggangshan Fire Brigade
17 Nov	Young stage	Ants, Colorful Hulunbeir Children's Choir
24 Nov	Gathering of sisters	AYA, Fang Fang, Kan Mi-youn
1 Dec	Gathering of sisters	Yang Hong, Ma Chang, Yan Jiapei, Wuhan Institute of Physical Education Dance Team, Rose
8 Dec	Hometown Tourism Festival	G. yung Drung Rgyal, Li Na, Ham Yu, Tan Weiwei, Jason Zhang
15 Dec	Beckham's trip to China	Huang Jianxiang, David Beckham
29 Dec	I know my taste	Will Pan, KIG Street Dance, Women's Synchronised Swimming Team

=== Season 2: 2008 ===
Date	Episode	Guest
5 Jan	Happy in the Star	Bai Junye, Dong Bowen, Bi Shikao, Xiao Xiaotuan
12 Jan	Play the Sound 2008	Li Heng, Bai Jing, Gao Ziqi, Liu Xuanchen, Hu Xilong, Huang Ruomeng, Wang Jinsong, Yu Quan
19 Jan	King of the Night (I)	Jason Zhang, Jeffrey Ji, Reborn P. K. Pacharapon Jantieng, Rujjana Utaiwan, Patcha, Thailand Seven Girls
26 Jan	King of the Night (II)	Jason Zhang, Jeffrey Ji, Reborn P. K. Pacharapon Jantieng, Rujjana Utaiwan, Patcha, Thailand Seven Girls
3 Feb	Love Tactics	Chen Zihan, Ng Man-tat, Kim Jeong-hoon, Yuan Wenkang
9 Feb	Mouse Greets Happy	Spring Replay (Series 1)
16 Feb	Mouse Greets Happy	Spring Replay (Series 2)
23 Feb	Mouse Greets Happy	Spring Replay (Series 3)
1 Mar	Play the Sound 2008	Yale Asia Symphony Orchestra, Liu Jie, Halama Sisters
8 Mar	Romance of Three Kingdoms	Men's Bally Fitness Cheerleader, Caffe-in, Shim Mina
15 Mar	Blooming of Spring Flowers	Michelle Ye, Chelsey Lee Mark, Wu Jiaxiang, Kaike'er Manni
22 Mar	Happy Being Together	He Jiong, Sitar Tan, Yu Haoming, Allen Su
29 Mar	Spring Comes Flower Blossom	Lei Shide, The Flowers, Da Zhang Wei, Wang Wenbo, Shi Xingyu, Guo Yang
5 Apr	Spring Comes Flower Blossom	Phoenix Legend, Xiong Yueying (Huang Ming, Zhang Junning and Zhou Yiwei)
12 Apr	I'm a Star	Huang Xiaoming, Lan Bo
19 Apr	Impression of China	Su Shuiwen, Double College Student Team, Jackie Chan's Martial Arts School Shaolin Team
26 Apr	I Will Not Let My Fame Fade	Hongye, Lollipop F
3 May	Invisible Wings	Yu Tiantain, Song Xiaobi, Yeung Kwong
10 May	Top Players	Zheng Taishun, Kone
17 May	2008 Wenchuan earthquake	Off-air
24 May	2008 Wenchuan earthquake	Off-air
31 May	2008 Wenchuan earthquake	Off-air
7 Jun	2008 Wenchuan earthquake	Off-air
14 Jun	Children Looking at the Olympics, Sharing the Spotlight	Liu Yifei, Jackie Chan, Kenny Bee, Yeung Kwong, Jason Zhang, Chen Chusheng, Sitar Tan, Jia Tong
21 Jun	Happiness Does Transmit	Chris Lee, Sou Jiuquan, Xun Lianyuan
28 Jun	Children Looking at the Olympics, Sharing the Spotlight (Re-run)	Liu Yifei, Jackie Chan, Kenny Bee, Yeung Kwong, Jason Zhang, Chen Chusheng, Sitar Tan, Jia Tong
5 Jul	2008 Wenchuan earthquake	Off-air
12 Jul	I Love the Olympics	Changsha Gymnastics School, Liu Xuan, Re Nuo, Baby Floats
19 Jul	I Love the Olympics	Jiujiang Nunchuck Women's Team
26 Jul	To Complete, Nine Beauty	Chris Lee, Leon Jay Williams, Li Xiang
2 Aug	I Love the Olympics	Andy Hui, Kung-Fu Pop
9 Aug	I Love the Olympics	Extreme sports performers, Tian Xin
16 Aug	I Love the Olympics	Five Continent's Singer Orchestra
23 Aug	I Love the Olympics	Xinmin Primary School Students, War dancing instructor group (Brazil)
30 Aug	2008 Panzhihua earthquake	Off-air
6 Sep	2008 Summer Paralympic Games	Off-air
13 Sep	I love the Olympics	Ou Lilian, Lu Wenlong
20 Sep	I love the Olympics	Pole dancing groups, Nicky Wu
27 Sep	White Angel (re-run)	BOBO
4 Oct	Flying Butterfly	Wu Chun, Charlene Choi, Ching Siu-tung
11 Oct	I Just Love Music	BOBO, Jam Hsiao
17 Oct	The Main Star	Miriam Yeung, Jason Zhang
25 Oct	Move Move Move	Changsha Middle School students, Li Xiaolu, Ariel Lin
1 Nov	Love Tactics	Vivian Hsu
8 Nov	MAN	Joe Cheng, Top Combine
15 Nov	Mic Whore	Da Mouth, Aisa Senda, Harry Chang, MC 40, Sakamoto Chunghua, The Eighteen Bronze
22 Nov	The Most Famous	HIT-5, Dicky Cheung
29 Nov	Fashion Show	Pace Wu, JJ Lin
6 Dec	New Tricks	Nicky Lee, Parkour group
13 Dec	My Darling Clementine	Donnie Yen, Lynn Hung
20 Dec	Spring Comes Flower Blossom	Ye Pei (Champion magicians and Olympic cheerleaders)
27 Dec	The Main Star	Yoga Lin, Benny Chan

=== Season 3: 2009 ===
Date	Episode	Guest
3 Jan	Class of Youth Dreams	Mayday
10 Jan	The Decreed by Fate I Love You	Ethan Juan, Joe Chen
17 Jan	Congratulations Congratulations	Ulgy Wudi (Season 2), Hey Girl, The Eighteen Bronze
24 Jan	Cow Greets Happy	Spring Replay (Series 1)
31 Jan	Cow Greets Happy	Spring Replay (Series 2)
7 Feb	Cow Greets Happy	Spring Replay (Series 3)
14 Feb	Cow Greets Happy	Spring Replay (Series 4)
21 Feb	Big Woman Little Man	A-One, Ruby Lin
28 Feb	Fighting	By2, Kenji Wu
7 Mar	More and More Love	Fahrenheit
14 Mar	Play It Cool	Wu Bai, Stanley Huang
21 Mar	More and More Love	International pair dancing instructors, Guangzhou Arts School, Zhang Shuai, Zhao Wei
28 Mar	I Love to Watch Movies	Kingdom Yuen, Andy Lau's sons (Andox and Box), Ronny Ching
4 Apr	Class of Youth Dreams	Chun Xiao, Mayday
9 Apr	Double-sided Princess	Jolin Tsai, Xu Mengya, Zhou Sicheng
11 Apr	Seek Friends	Genie Chuo, Lu Chen
16 Apr	Big Beauty War	Serina Liu, Pink Yang, Riley teachers
18 Apr	I Am More Brilliant Than The Giants	Jay Chou, Vincent Fang, Danny Chan, Ice Cream, Du Guozhang
23 Apr	Seek Friends	Fahrenheit, Wu Bai, Sa Dingding
25 Apr	I Am More Brilliant Than The Giants	Vincent Fang, Danny Chan, Ice Cream, Du Guozhang
30 Apr	City's Voice	Huang Lu, Liu Daye, Ivana Wong
2 May	Share The Love	Huang Pin-yuan, Karena Lam, Dylan Kuo, Evonne Hsu
6 Jun	Happy Magic Wand	Kobayashi Kohei, Callaci Gil Echeverria Mirko, Eric Ching
13 Jun	Summer Classics	Grasshopper, Chen Shu-Fen
20 Jun	Super Girls Are Here	Super Girl contestants (Top 18)
27 Jun	New Sound Scares People	Khalil Fong, Ma Guangfu
4 Jul	Refreshing Summertime Hong Kong Disneyland	Jacky Cheung
11 Jul	Smile in My Heart	Zhang Jiani, Ming Dow, He Minghan, Ma Ke, Jill Hsu
18 Jul	Eavesdrop (I)	Louis Koo, Daniel Wu, Sean Lau, Jason Zhang
25 Jul	Eavesdrop (II)	Louis Koo, Daniel Wu, Sean Lau, Jason Zhang
1 Aug	Tracing Shadow	Francis Ng, Xie Na, Jaycee Chan, Pace Wu, Hu Ge
8 Aug	Kung Fu Cyborg (I)	Eric Tsang, Jeffrey Lau, Betty Sun, Ronald Cheng, Alex Fong, Gan Wei
15 Aug	Let's Go Watch Meteor Shower	Let's Go Watch Meteor Shower Zhang Han, Zheng Shuang, Yu Haoming, Vision Wei, Zhu Zixiao
22 Aug	Kung Fu Cyborg (II)	Eric Tsang, Jeffrey Lau, Betty Sun, Ronald Cheng, Alex Fong, Gan Wei
29 Aug	Big Records	Jaycee Chan, Jacky Cheung
5 Sep	Innocence Forever	Nationwide students, Tsai Ming, Voice actors
12 Sep	Small Line Meets Big Arena	Coco Lee
19 Sep	Happy Basket Apprentice	Shawn Johnson, Shane Battier
26 Sep	Happy in a Dozen	Joey Yung
3 Oct	More and More Love	Gao Feng, Farmers Cast and director
10 Oct	365 More Beautiful	Every occupation professional, Andy Ge, North and South Prom King and Queens (Zhang Hangrui, Wang Xiwei, Li Yeqing and Qiao Renliang)
17 Oct	The Real Me M	Super Junior-M, Kim Min-ji
24 Oct	Happy in a Dozen II	Huang Bo, Huang Yi, Du Haitao, Nanjing Opera, Super Junior-M
31 Oct	Happy Camp @ Seoul	Lee Min-ho, Han Chae-young, Yoon Eun-Hye, Lin Chi-ling
7 Nov	I Love Panda	Panda, Jane Zhang
14 Nov	Happy Music Fest	Sodagreen, Hermit Group
21 Nov	Big Rescuing War	Dai Long, Prince of Salmon, Ramen Master, Restlessness Inn Miss, Beijing Emergency Medical Center
28 Nov	Small Line Meets Big Arena (Season 2)	Chae Yeon, Hip-hop cloth-wrapper Shop, Li Yuanzai
5 Dec	Trick Boys & Trick Girls	BOBO, Qi Wei, Wang Xiyi, Big Missy, Super Brother
12 Dec	Happy Paradise	Jason Zhang, Kim Joon, Animal Stars, Dolls
19 Dec	Rhapsody	Chris Lee, Kevin
26 Dec	Love Just Reside Together	Top Combine, Yoga Lin, Guo Shuyao (aka Yaoyao)

=== Season 4: 2010 ===
Date	Episode	Guest
2 Jan	Please Sing 2010	Yico Zeng, Small Red Leaf Band, Performing Art Group
9 Jan	Burning	Ballet aunties, Community Aunties, Huang Ling, Female bodyguards
16 Jan	In Love With Your Beauty	Niu Xinxin, Xiao Caiqi, Pan Delong, Xu Jie, Zhang Xinyu, Shoushou, Kongyansong & Kongyaozhu sisters, National prom queen
23 Jan	Idol Showdown	Mark Chao, Godfrey Gao, Zou Cheng'en, Hans Zhang Yu Haoming, Zhu Zixiao
30 Jan	Happy Festival	Sandra Ng, Raymond Wong Ho-yin, Li Nian
6 Feb	Little Big Soldier	Little Big Soldier crew, Jackie Chan
14 Feb	This year I Am Most Famous (Spring Festival re-run); Location: Seoul, Hong Kong Disneyland	Chris Lee, Khalil Fong
15 Feb	Idol Showdown (Spring Festival re-run)	Mark Chao, Godfrey Gao, Zou Cheng'en, Hans Zhang, Yu Haoming, Zhu Zixiao
16 Feb	The Real Me M (Spring Festival re-run)	Super Junior-M, Kim Min-ji
17 Feb	Fated to Love You (Spring Festival re-run)	Ethan Juan, Joe Chen
18 Feb	In Love With Your Beauty (Spring Festival re-run)	Niu Xinxin, Xiao Caiqi, Pan Delong, Xu Jie, Zhang Xinyu, Shoushou, Kongyansong & Kongyaozhu sisters, National prom queen
19 Feb	Happy Paradise (Spring Festival re-run)	Jason Zhang, Kim Joon, Animal Stars, Dolls
20 Feb	Congratulations Congratulations (Spring Festival re-run)	Ulgy Wudi (Season II): Liu Xiaohu, Mao Junjie, Wang Kai, Wu Qijiang, Li Xinru, Hey Girl, The Eighteen Bronze
20 Feb	Joy From Heaven (Spring Festival re-run)	Jolin Tsai, Chae Yeon, Jaycee Chan, Jackie Chan, Louis Koo, Jason Zhang, Fahrenheit, Super Junior-M
21 Feb	Double-sided Princesses (Spring Festival re-run)	Jolin Tsai, Xu Mengya, Zhou Sicheng
22 Feb	Eavesdrop (Part A) (Spring Festival re-run)	Louis Koo, Daniel Wu, Sean Lau, Jason Zhang
23 Feb	Let's Go Watch Meteor Shower (Spring Festival re-run)	Hans Zhang, Zheng Shuang, Yu Haoming, Vision Wei, Zhu Zixiao
24 Feb	Trick Boys & Trick Girls (Spring Festival re-run)	BOBO, Qi Wei, Wang Xiyi, Big Missy, Super brother
25 Feb	Love Just Reside Together (Spring Festival re-run)	Top Combine, Yoga Lin, Guo Shuyao (aka Yaoyao)
26 Feb	More and More Love (Spring Festival re-run)	Fahrenheit
27 Feb	Happy Festival (Spring Festival re-run)	Sandra Ng, Raymond Wong, Li Nian
27 Feb	The Secret (Spring Festival re-run)	BoBo, Da Zhang Wei, Jackie Chan and the New Seven Little Fortunes, Jason Zhang, Hans Zhang, Zhang Yuan, Happy Camp directors
6 Mar	Avenue of Stars	Avenue of Stars Top singers (2009): Heini Auntie, Li Yushan, Wang Mu
13 Mar	Happy Kingdom	Liu Feier, Gu Chen, Wang Lina, Dancing Prince, Flower Drum Opera Big 4
20 Mar	New Tricks	Zhang Yitian, Crazy shrimps, pet dogs, Robotics Team
27 Mar	Star Academy	Wong Jing, Louis Fan, Yang Mi, Jiang Jinfu, Guo Wei, Maggie Lee
3 Apr	Romance Thirty-Six Stratagems	Ethan Juan, Shin, Beauty dating group (Zhou Liangshi, MARY, Zhang Zhongyuan, Liu Zheng and Xiao Ying)
10 Apr	Current Night	Jing Chang, Huo Siyan, Trend Animals, Current Mother and Child (SASA and YIYI)
17 Apr	Want to be in Love	KIMIKO, Niu Er, Liu Xiaoman, Mario, Zhou Simin, Zhou Sicheng
24 Apr	2010 Yushu earthquake	Off-air
22 May	3 True Flames	S.H.E
21 Aug	Opening Ceremony	Wonder Girls
4 Sep	In The Happiness of Disastrous	Janet
27 Nov	2010 Asian Games	Off-air

=== Season 5: 2011 ===
Date	Episode	Guest
1 Jan	People's Forces	Jerry Yan, Lang Lang, Mayday, China Dolls
8 Jan	In the Name of Love	Eddie Peng
15 Jan	I Love HK	Michael Tse, Raymond Wong Ho-yin, Fala Chen, Aarif Lee
22 Jan	Fall in Love cast	Zhang Han, Jiang Kaitong, Qiao Qiao, Guan Zhiling, Dennis'O, Annie Wu, Li Xiang
29 Jan		Li Qin, Wu Junru
5 Nov	Summer Passion	Mayday
12 Nov		Jason Zhang
19 Nov		Liu Xiaoqing
31 Dec	2011–2012 Hunan TV New Year Concert	Off-air

=== Season 6: 2012 ===
Date	Guests	Episode/Movie
7 Jan	Ceng Zhiwei, Li Ruoxuan, Qiu Qiu, Wang Zulan, Ruan Zhaoxiang, Li Sijie, Zhang Keyi, Wang Han, Ou Di	The Fortune Buddies
14 Jan	Lee Min-ho, Cool Guy	Cool Guy
21 Jan	Zhou Yumin, Yang Mi, Ella Chen, Zhu Yanping	New Perfect Two
9 Jun	EXO-M, Li Chen, Guo Jingming, Zhang Liangying	
21 Jul	EXO, Phoenix Legend, Zhang Jie, Lin Junjie	
08 Dec	Victoria Song (Fx)	

=== Season 7: 2013 ===
Date	Episode	Guest
5 Jan	Hero sad beauty	Dicky Cheung, Yu Shaoqun
12 Jan	Happy Home	Chapman To, Han Geng
19 Jan	Dream Pi	Chen Sicheng, Wang Sisi
26 Jan	The Variety Rookie Kings	Da Zhangwei, Kenny Kwan
2 Feb	New Year's Variety Match	Lin Chi-ling, Huang Bo
2 Mar		Miss A
9 Mar	Band Battle	Super 131, Timez
16 Mar	The Most Beautiful	f(x)
23 Mar	Change with Me	Qu Ying, Jia Ling, Shen Ling, Da Zhangwei, Bai Kainan
30 Mar	Best Partners	Khalil Fong, Fiona Sit, Eddie Peng, Bai Baihe
6 Apr	OPPA OPPA	Super Junior-M
13 Apr	Forever Youth	Wong Cho-lam, Han Geng, Mark Chao, Zheng Kai, Bao Beier
4 May	My Weirdo Friends	Bo-Lin Chen, Jaycee Chan, Kuo Tsai-chieh
11 May	Tit For Tat	Lee Joon-gi, Chen Xiang, Chen Xiao, Zhao Liying, Tang Yixing, Li Feifei
18 May	Mature Men	Tong Dawei, Deng Chao
25 May	This is Me	Wu Yi, Yu Shaoqun, Ren Zhong, Sun Jian
1 Jun	Date with Spring	Yu Haoming, Yuan Shanshan, Sunjian, Ji Jie, Zhao Hanyingzi, Xu Lu
6 July	Here's to Never Growing Up	EXO
27 July	Legend of Lu Zhen	Ray Zhang, Li Sheng, Andy Yang, Deng Lun, Zhao Li Ying, Kenny Kwan, Shirley Dai, Allen Ting
3 Aug		Fan Bing Bing, Lee Zhi Ting, Jiang Jin Fu
17Aug	Palace II	Zhou Dongyu, Chen Xiao, Zhao Li Ying, Peer Zhu, Bao Beier
2 Nov		Jimmy Lin, Zhang Liang
9 Nov		Gao Yuanyuan, Huang Haibo, Zhang Kaili, Ryan Zuo
16 Nov		Leon Jay Williams, Zhang Lanxin, Sodagreen
23 Nov		Jiro Wang, Nicky Wu, Lu Yi
30 Nov		Liu Yifei, Deng Chao, Chen Yufan, Cannon Hu
7 Dec		Zhang Liang, Liu Qian
14 Dec		Zhou Mi, Calvin Chen, Ni Ni, Jing Boran
21 Dec		Jackie Chan, Jing Tian, Ding Sheng, Lin Shen, Li Tai
28 Dec		YIF, Show Luo

=== Season 8: 2014 ===
Date	Episode	Guest
4 Jan	Go Study	Wallace Chung, Janine Chang, Zhang Meng, Jia Qing, Han Dong
11Jan	Next Stop, Male Gods	Guo Tao, Guo Zi Rui, Hua Chen Yu, Ou Hao, Bai Ju Gang
18Jan	Hard To Be A Woman	He Jiong, Vivian Hsu, Jiang Mengjie, Zhu Dan, Sun Jian, Wang Di
25Jan	It's Almost New Years	Han Geng, Ryan Cheng, Wang Li Kun, Helen Yao, Chen Sicheng, Tong Liya
1 Feb	It's New Years!	Dicky Cheung, Zheng Guo Lin, Huang Hai Bing, Ray Zhang, Ye Zu Xin
15Feb	I Am a Singer 2 Special	G.E.M., Shang Wenjie, Gary Chaw, Li Tai, Sun Jian, Yu Xiao Tong
22Feb	Jackie Chan “Scolds” Haitao on Stage	Jackie Chan, Wang Zhonglei, Jing Tian, Liu Ye, Huang Zitao (Tao)
1 Mar	Love Apartment 4 Cast Special	Chen He, Lou Yixiao, Sun Yizhou, Li Jinming, Li Jiahang, Wang Chuanjun
8 Mar	Rain's First Variety Appearance After Military Service	Rain, Liu Yifei, Tang Yan, Wang Xuebing, Andy On
15Mar	Ekin Cheng and Kelly Chen Share Embarrassing Stories	Ekin Cheng, Kelly Chen, Lam Siu-fung, Michael Tse, Chin Ka-lok
22Mar	The Wife's Secret Cast Special	Hawick Lau, Zhao Liying, Ding Zijun, Kenny Kwan, Wang Zhi
29Mar	Comedy Stars Showdown	Da Zhangwei, Shen Ling, Bai Kainan, Jia Ling, Qu Ying, Dapeng
5 Apr	Bai Baihe Reveals Her True Personality	Bai Baihe, Eddie Peng, Jiang Jinfu, Wei Daxun
5 Jul	Male Gods	EXO
12 Jul		William Chan, Li Yi Feng, Ma Tianyu, Park Yoochun

=== Season 9: 2015 ===
Date	Episode	Guest
3 Jan	Singers fightings	
10 Jan	Joe Cheng Have Luck and Fun	Joe Cheng
17 Jan		Han Geng, Uniq
24 Jan	Celebrity Parents	
31 Jan	Chris Lee Acts as a Koala	Chris Lee
7 Feb	The New Group	Jackie Chan, Leo Ku, Han Geng
14 Feb	Dad where are you going TV Show	
21 Feb	Li Yifeng and Tiffany VS TFBoys	Li Yifeng, TFBoys
28 Feb	Nicholas Tse shows lovely Photos	Nicholas Tse
7 Mar	Cute Guy Contest	
14 Mar	Huang Xiaoming Proposes to Angelababy	Huang Xiaoming, Angelababy, Zhang Yixing, Qiao Renliang
21 Mar	Kris Wu VS William	Kris Wu Yi Fan, William Chan, Yang Yang, Zhang Han
28 Mar	TFBoys Fascinate Everyone	TFBoys
18 Apr	The Left Ear VS Forever Young	
25 Apr	Psy Dances with a Kid	Psy
2 May	Xiaoming and Angelababy show their love	Huang Xiaoming, Angelababy, Yang Mi, Sui He, Ma Su
9 May	Hilarious Performance with Wang Baoqiang	Wang Baoqiang
16 May	Hans Zhang VS Jing Bo Ran	Hans Zhang, Jing Bo Ran, Yang Yang, Ji Chang Wook
23 May	Jing Boran with Divas Hit the Road Crew	Jing Boran, Yang Yang, Zheng Shuang, Ivy Chen
30 May	Opening Ceremony of Fat Farm	
13 June	Exposure of Li Yifeng's Secrets	
20 June	Bosco Wong Becomes a Young Girl	Bosco Wong
27 June	Journey of Flower Crews	
4 July	Li Yifeng with Forever Young Crews	Li Yifeng, Wei Daxun, Jiang Jinfu, Leon Zhang, Huang Lei, Wang Youshuo, Zhang Yuxi, Zhang Huiwen, Li Xin'ai, Calvin Tu, Song Yi, Chai Ge
11 July	18th Anniversary Celebration	
18 July	Looking Good Yang Yang and Leo Wu	Yang Yang, Leo Wu, Bai Jingting, JJ Lin, CN Blue Jung Yonghwa
25 July	Vic's confession to Luodan Wang	
1 Aug	Ivy and Bibi Become Workaholics	
8 Aug	Rapper Jia Nailiang	Jia Nailiang
15 Aug	Zhang Liang Dressing in Lady's Cloth	Zhang Liang
22 Aug	Marriage life of Leo Ku and Vivian Chow	Leo Ku, Vivian Chow
29 Aug	Detective Wong Cho-lam	Wong Cho-lam
06 Sept	Men in Uniform	Leo Wu
12 Sept	Busan Special	CNBLUE
19 Sept	Vicki Zhao with her New Movie	Vicki Zhao
26 Sept	YaoChen Tiffany Tang have short memories	Yao Chen, Tiffany Tang
3 Oct	Group of the Legend of Zu	
10 Oct	Singing Performance from Zhou Xun	Zhou Xun
17 Oct	TV Dramas VS Movie Dramas	
24 Oct	Qiao Zhenyu and Zheng Kai's Ranking Competition	Qiao Zhenyu, Zheng Kai
31 Oct	Arrival of Yang Mi and Lu Han	Yang Mi, Luhan, Zhu Yawen
7 Nov	Lovely couple: Jordan Chan and Cherrie Ying	Jordan Chan, Cherrie Ying
14 Nov	Agent Victoria VS Agent Zhang Liang	
21 Nov	Arrival of Li Xiaolu	Li Xiaolu, Zhang Yixing, Chen Xuedong, Jiang Wen
28 Nov	Yang Mi and Bibi Zhou with Dilraba	Leon Zhang, Dilraba Dilmurat, Yang Mi y Bibi Zhou
5 Dec	Good news from Angelababy	Angelababy
12 Dec	Jia Nailiang with Lovely Tian Xin	Jia Nailiang, Tian Xin
19 Dec	Lovely Couple Deng Chao and Sun Li	Deng Chao, Sun Li
26 Dec	Kris Wu cross holding Li Yifeng	Kris Wu, Li Yifeng

=== Season 10: 2016 ===
Date	Guests	Episode/Movie
2 Jan	Jiang Jinfu, Lu Yi, Shen Teng, Ma Li, Hu Bingqing, You Jingru	The Legend of Qin
21 May	Song Joong-ki	Descendants of the Sun
18 June	Leo Wu	
1 Oct	Guo Jingming, Fan Bingbing, Chen Xuedong, Wang Yuan, Lin Yun [17 Sep 2016]	L.O.R.D: Legend of Ravaging Dynasties
8 Oct	[20 Aug 2016] Huang Zitao, Janice Wu, Tan Songyun	
15 Oct	Zhang Ruoyun, Yin Zheng, Liu Haoran, Zhang Xinyu	
22 Oct	Sheng Yilun, Dilraba Dilmurat, Du Chun, Ma Su, Wu Yi	Pretty Li Huizhen
29 Oct	Zhang Zhilin, Yuan Yongyi, Tian Liang, Sha Yi, Dong Li, Zhang Lunshuo, Li Yihang, Cui Yahan	Grade One (Graduation Season); Where Are We Going, Dad? (Season 4)
5 Nov	Yang Mi, Tong Liya, Jiang Jinfu, Huang Zitao, Zhang Lanxin, Shen Mengchen, Li Rui	Takes a Real Man (Season 2)
12 Nov	Ming Dao, Zhang Jingchu, Yuan Hong, Zhang Xinyi, Qin Lan, 胥渡吧	We Are in Love
19 Nov	Wang Jia'er, Wang Ou, Wei Daxun, Yang Di	Fantastic Beasts and Where to Find Them 头号惊喜; Shuttle Love Millennium
26 Nov	Phoenix Legend, Yu Quan, Pan Weibo, Liu Wei, Sun Jian, Shen Ling	
3 Dec	Zhang Hanyun, Peng Guanying, Zhou Mi, Wang Feifei, Liang Yongqi, Yu Xiaotong, Sun Jian, Yuan Shanshan	Princess of Lanling King
10 Dec	Ou Hao, Bai Jingting, Cai Guoqing, Zhang Liang	Blood of Youth; Three Weddings
17 Dec	Tang Yan, Han Dongjun, Liu Wei, Yang Di, Zhang Haochen	
24 Dec	Cheng Long, Wang Kai, Huang Zitao, Wang Dalu, Sang Ping, Ding Cheng, Zhang Xi	Railroad Tigers

=== Season 11: 2017 ===
Date	Guests	Episode/Movie
7 Jan	Wang Baoqiang, Wang Zulan, Bai Ke, Zhao Yingjun, Yue Yunpeng	Buddies in India
14 Jan	Eddie Peng, Deng Chao, Dong Zijian, Han Han	Duckweed
21 Jan	Wu Yifan, Lin Yun, Wang Likun, Lin Gengxin, Bao Bei'er	Journey to the West: The Demons Strike Back
28 Jan	Tang Yan, Zhou Bichang, Rong Zu'er, Zhang Han, Xie Tingfeng, Xu Hao, Shen Ling	Cook Up a Storm; Amazing Kids
4 Feb	Jia Nailiang, Ma Li, Yu Yang, Wang Xun, Wu Yi, Zhong Hanliang, Sun Yizhou	Once Upon a Time in the Northeast
18 Feb	Dilraba Dilmurat, Xi Mengyao, Sheng Yilun, Yu Menglong, Sun Jian, Wei Daxun, Yang Di, X NINE	Pretty Li Huizhen; Eternal Love
25 Feb	[26 Nov 2016]	
4 Mar	Huang Lei, Wang Xun, Wei Daxun, Yang Di, Liu Xianhua, Zhang Yihan	What a Wonderful Family! Back to Field
11 Mar	Da Zhangwei, Ren Jialun, Yu Xiaotong, Yiyang Qianxi, Li Xian, Xu Hao	The Glory of Tang Dynasty; Let Go of My Baby; Day Day Up; Amazing Kids
18 Mar		
25 Mar	Su Youpeng, Song Qian, Zhang Luyi	The Devotion of Suspect X Who's the Murderer
1 Apr	Lin Yichen, Chen Xiao, Sha Yi, Hu Ke, Bao Bei'er, Bao Wenjing	Super Mom; The Mysterious Family
8 Apr	Gao Weiguang, Dilraba Dilmurat, Zhang Liang, Zhang Yunlong, Yin Zheng, Yao Weitao, Tian Shu, Huang Yan, Sheng Ji, Mi Bao, Guan Pingchao	Eternal Love
15 Apr	Wu Yingjie, Wei Daxun, Zhou Yutong, Deng Lun, Song Weilong, Wu You, Dai Chao, Sun Yi	
22 Apr	Yu Wenle, Yang Qianhua, Zhang Yunlong, Jiang Jinfu, Chen Ya'an, Kan Qingzi, Jiang Mengjie	Lightning; Love Off the Cuff
29 Apr	Yang Youning, Chen Bolin, Jiang Shuying, Jing Boran, Gulnazar, Lai Yumeng, Song Zu'er	Divas Hit the Road (Season 3)
6 May	Zhang Xinyu, Qiao Zhenyu, Zhang Liangying, Ma Ke, Yiyang Qianxi, Jin Wenqi	Song of Phoenix
13 May	Jiang Chao, Bai Ke, Yang Xuwen, Han Geng, Xu Haiqiao	
20 May	Zhang Ruoyun, Ma Sichun, Lu Han, Chen Shu, Gulnazar, Zeng Shunxi, Yang Di	Fighter of the Destiny
27 May	Yang Zi, Qin Junjie, Ren Jialun, Shu Chang, Liang Tian, Yang Di, Liu Xianhua	Legend of Dragon Pearl; The Destiny of White Snake
3 Jun	Gu Juji, Sun Jian, Zhang Bichen, Wang Yuan, Yang Di	
10 Jun	Wei Chen, Deng Lun, Yu Xiaotong, Wang Yuan, Yang Di, Liu Xianhua	
17 Jun	Tang Yixin, Han Dongjun, Hu Yanbin, Yang Di, Liu Xianhua	Transformers: The Last Knight
24 Jun	Xu Lu, Ruan Jingtian, Song Qian, Xia Yu, Wang Feifei, Yang Di, Liu Xianhua, Cao Tongrui	Candle in the Tomb; Wished
1 Jul	Zhang Zhilin, Rong Zu'er, Liu Kaiwei, Geng Le, Wei Daxun, Song Qian, Liu Xianhua, Tan Yanyu	The House That Never Dies 2
8 Jul	Chen Weiting, Zhao Liying, Huang Zitao, Song Xiaobao, Ouyang Nana, Chen Feiyu, Ren Jialun, Niu Junfeng, Zhao Xiulei, Wang Bowen, SNH48, X NINE, Zhang Haochen	Secret Fruit
15 Jul	Zhang Han, Zhang Liang, Wang Zulan, Angelababy, Zhang Yixing, Zhang Dada	
22 Jul	Han Geng, Shen Teng, Ma Su, Bao Bei'er, Sun Jian, Zhu Zixiao, Wu Yi, Wei Daxun, Shen Ling, Deng Lun, Zhu Yawen, Wang Dalu, Zhang Tian'ai, 时尚七太, Fan Yuancheng, Jin Xiao	
29 Jul	TFBOYS, Ma Sichun, Zhou Dongyu, Dou Jingtong, Mark Chao	Soul Mate
5 Aug	Li Yuchun, YIF, MCTianyou, Tang Guoqiang, Liu Haoran, Guan Xiaotong, Zeng Shunxi, Phoenix Legend, TFBOYS	When We Were Young
12 Aug	TFBOYS, Zhang Zifeng, Tang Yuzhe, Li Fei'er, Yang Di, Song Qian, Chen Ruolin, Qiao Shiyu, Chen Geng, Liu Ye	Boyhood
19 Aug	Li Jian, Chen Li, Luo Zhixiang, 2017 Super Boy contestants	2017 Super Boy
26 Aug	Zhao Wei, Huang Xiaoming, Zhang Liang, Tong Dawei, Zhou Dongyu, Jin Mengjia, Chen Qiao'en	Chinese Restaurant; Love Actually
2 Sep	Wu Yifan, Ma Su, Jony J, Tizzy T, Gui Bian, Sun Bayi, Hui Zi, BrAnT.B, PG One	The Rap of China
9 Sep	Wu Lei (Leo Wu), Wang Jia'er, Chen Feiyu, Chen Xuedong, Li Xian, Xing Zhaolin, Lang Lang	
16 Sep	Xiong Ziqi, Huang Xuan, Mike D'Angelo, Mao Xiaotong, Zhong Chuxi, Miao Miao, Yang Caiyu, Li Xiaofeng	
23 Sep	Chen He, Wang Zulan, Bao Bei'er, Chen Ziyou, Da Peng, Qiao Shan	City of Rock
30 Sep	Li Chen, Fan Bingbing, Li Chenhao, Wei Daxun, 中国空军霹雳部队	Sky Hunter
7 Oct	Pan Weibo, Zhang Liang, Angelababy	
14 Oct	Zhang Ruoyun, Ma Ke, Niu Junfeng, Jiang Chao, Hou Minghao, Xiong Ziqi, Lü Xiaoyu, Yu Meihong, Li Zixuan	
21 Oct	Zhang Bichen, Zhou Bichang, Guo Biting, Huang Zongze, Xiong Ziqi, Tan Songyun	The Starry Night, The Starry Sea 2
28 Oct	Ma Sichun, Sheng Yilun, Pan Weibo, Li Ronghao	Oh My General
4 Nov	Liu Tao, Wang Ke, Chen Xiang, Kan Qingzi, Ji Lingchen, Wang Zulan, Li Yanan, Chen Ziyou, Ma Sichao	The Inn
11 Nov	Du Jiang, Wu Zhun, Pan Yueming, Ai Lun, Bai Jingting, TF Family	Where Are We Going, Dad? (Season 5); Day and Night
18 Nov	Hu Ge, Jian Renzi, Chen Long, Hu Bing, Xu Ge, Xiong Ziqi, Wei Daxun	Game of Hunting
25 Nov	Jiang Chao, Sha Yi, Zhang Dada, Yang Shuo, Lin Yun, Chen Bolin, Zhang Yunlong	Dog Partner; The Dreaming Man
2 Dec	Tang Yixin, Pan Yueming, Yiyang Qianxi, Wang Jia, Guan Xiaotong, Wu Muye	
9 Dec	Liu Haoran, Chen Sicheng, Yuan Hong, Zhao Lixin, Zhang Li, Ouyang Nana, Chen Hao	Great Expectations; Bleeding Steel
16 Dec	Ma Ke, Guan Xiaotong, Ren Zhong, Chen Xiang, Wang Yanlin, Zhang Xiaolong	Love of Aurora
23 Dec	Wu Junru, Shen Teng, Zhou Yiwei, Du Jiang, Hu Yitian, Papi Jiang, Liu Wei	Goldbuster; A Love So Beautiful; Operation Red Sea
30 Dec		Namiya

=== Season 12: 2018 ===
Date	Guests	Episode/Movie
6 Jan	Li Bingbing, Wu Chun, Niu Junfeng, Wu Yi, Zhang Xincheng, Liu Wei, Fang Jiayi	Guardians of the Tomb; Jumanji: Welcome to the Jungle
13 Jan	Wang Kai, Ma Tianyu, Wang Dalu, Ye Zuxin	A Better Tomorrow 2018
20 Jan	Wei Xun, YOUNG-G, Mao Buyi, Zhao Tianyu, Hu Yitian, Zhong Chuxi, Mao Yanqi	
27 Jan	Guo Degang, Yu Qian, Yue Yunpeng, Guo Qilin, Yang Di	The Faces of My Gene
3 Feb	Zhang Yixing, Wu Yingjie, Yang Di	Idol Producer
10 Feb	Song Weilong, Liu Haoran, Wang Sulong, Wang Xun, Xiao Yang, Li Haofei	Untouchable Lovers; Detective Chinatown 2
17 Feb	Dilraba Dilmurat, Zhou Yumin, Rong Zu'er, Wu Lei (Leo Wu), Yuan Hong, Zhang Binbin, Zhang Xincheng	The Flame's Daughter; Hilarious Family
24 Feb	Su Shiding, Zhang Tian, Zhang Shaohan, Zhai Tianlin, Tan Songyun, Sun Jian, Xin Zhilei	Singer 2018
3 Mar	Han Xue, Pan Yueming, Yang Di, Xiong Ziqi, Liu Wei, Wang Yanlin	
10 Mar		
17 Mar	Peng Yuchang, Zhang Xueying, Xing Zhaolin, Zhang Xincheng, Zhang Bichen, Zhao Tianyu, Ji Lingchen, Mao Buyi, Yu Wenwen	
24 Mar	Deng Lun, Yang Di, Bai Jingting, Yang Rong, Ma Sichun, Han Xue	Who's the Keyman
31 Mar	Han Dongjun, Xiong Ziqi, Liu Wei, Ji Lingchen, Hu Yitian, Sun Yi	Siege in Fog
7 Apr	Han Geng, Jian Renzi, Xu Zhengxi, Hu Bingqing, Xiong Ziqi, Zhang Danfeng	The Legend of Dugu; Looking for Rohmer
14 Apr	Wu Yingjie, Tang Yixin, Zhong Chuxi, Guo Jingfei, Dong Zijian, Wang Yanlin	Dude's Manual; 21 Carats
21 Apr	Han Dongjun, Ma Tianyu, Mike D'Angelo, Jing Boran, Liu Ruoying	Us and Them; Secret of the Three Kingdoms
29 Apr	Shen Yue, Chen Feiyu, Hu Xianxu, Peng Yuchang, Song Weilong, Zhou Jieqiong, Yu Wenwen, Zhang He	
5 May	Yang Di, Liu Wei, Xi Mengyao, Tong Liya, Cai Shaofen	How Long Will I Love You
12 May	Huang Lei, Liu Xianhua, Peng Yuchang, Huang Zongze, Wu Zhuoxi	Back to Field (Season 2); Flying Tiger
19 May	Lan Yingying, Jing Chao, Zhou Yiwei, Yuan Hong, Qi Wei, Xiao Zhan, Zhang Han	Here to Heart; Women in Beijing; Oh! My Emperor
26 May	Shen Yue, Connor Leong, Caesar Wu, Darren Chen, Dylan Wang, Cao Yunjin, Liu Wei, Chai Zhiping	Meteor Garden Reborn
2 Jun	Nine Percent	
9 Jun	Xiong Ziqi, Zhou Jieqiong, Zhang Jie, Yu Quan	
16 Jun	[2 Jun 2018], [9 Jun 2018]	
23 Jun	Li Dan, Wang Yanlin, Wang Sulong, Yu Wenwen, Li Yifeng, Chen Qiao'en	Animal World
30 Jun	Peng Yuchang, Zhai Tianlin, Hu Yitian, Zhu Zhen, Guo Jingfei, Zhang Liang	Take My Brother Away
7 Jul	Cheng Xiao, Wang Yibo, NEX7	
14 Jul	Dylan Wang, Darren Chen, Zhu Yilong, Bai Yu, Xiong Ziqi, Li Landi	Guardian
18 Aug	Wu Jinyan, Charmaine Sheh, Xu Kai, Qin Lan	Story of Yanxi Palace

=== Season 13: 2019 ===
Date	Guests	Episode/Movie
5 January	Han Geng, Wu Lei (Leo Wu), Huang Minghao (Justin), Liu Yuning	
9 February	Zhang Jianing	
2 March	Tan Jianci	
30 March	Wu Lei (Leo Wu), Wang Ziyi, 井柏然、吴磊、马思纯 +	
11 August	Wang Yibo, Xiao Zhan, Qiao Xin, Wei Daxun, Wu Jinyan, Wang Zhuocheng, Yu Bin	The Untamed Ordinary Glory
14 December	Wu Lei (Leo Wu), Liu Tao and more	The Inn (TV program)
21 December	Wu Lei (Leo Wu), William Chan, Tan Jianci and more	Adoring)

=== Season 14: 2020 ===
Date	Guests	Episode/Movie
22 Feb	Jackie Chan, Yang Yang, Zhu Zhengting	Vanguard
7 March	Wu Lei (Leo Wu), Song Zu'er, Lin Yanjun	
21 March	Jackie Chan, Xu Zheng, Yang Yang, Zhu Zhengting	Vanguard
30 May	Tan Jianci	
6 June	Dilraba Dilmurat, Huang Jingyu, Xu Kai	Love Advanced Customization
4 July	Ding Yu Xi, Qin Lan, Qin Hao	The Romance of Tiger and Rose, We Are All Alone, The Song of Glory

=== Season 15: 2021 ===
Date	Guests	Episode/Movie
2 Jan	William Chan, Liu Yuxin, Wei Daxun	
9 Jan	Zhang Ziyi, Peng Yuchang	
16 Jan	Huang Ling, Zhang Xinzhe, Huo Zun	
23 Jan	Yang Mi, Lei Jiayin, Guo Jingfei	
30 Jan	Zhou Xun, Chen Kun, Zhou Shen	
6 Feb	Jia Ling, Zhang Xiaofei, Chen He, Jia Ling	
13 Feb	Wang Oujing, Chao Zhang	
20 Feb	Wang Dalu, Lin Yi, Li Qin	
27 Feb	Hawick Lau, Chen Linong	
6 March	Han Xue, Zhang Hanyun, Yu Hazy, Li Zefeng	
13 March	Zhong Hanliang, Yang Diqi, Yu Hazy	Times Youth League
20 March	Dilraba Dilmurat, Wu Lei (Leo Wu), Zhou Shen, Liu Yuning	The Long Ballad
27 March	Qin Lan, Cecilia	
3 April	Zhang Zhehan, Gong Jun, Yin Xiaotian	Word of Honor
10 April	Jing Tian, Zhang Binbin, Tan Songyun, Zhong Hanliang	
17 April	Wang Yuan	
22 April	Ding Chengxin, Gong Jun, Yin Xiaotian	Xiaoding's working season 1
29 April	Ding Chengxin, Gong Jun, Yang Di	Xiaoding's working season 2
1 May	Wang Ou, Mao Xiaotong, Li Yitong	
15 May	Lucas Wong, Winwin, Gulnazar, Shen Yue	
5 June	Wei Daxun, Zhang Bichen, Jiu Jingyi, Song Yaxuan, Into1, Liu Yaowen	
19 June	Xu Kai, Vin Zhang, Mao Buyi, Gan Wangxing, Yan Haoxiang, He Junlin, Zhang Yuqi	
10 July	Song Yuqi, Deng Enxi, Yang Di, Hu Xia, Tan Jianci	
7 August	Dilraba Dilmurat, Yang Yang, Cai Guo Qing	You Are My Glory
14 August	Lang Lang, Gina, Bao Beier, Bao Wenjing, Jiro Wang, Gulnazar	
21 August	TF Family (Zhu Zhixin, Su Xinhao, Deng Jiaxin, Zhangji, Zuo Hang), Jason Zhang, Tia Ray, Amber Kuo, Gulnazar	
28 August	Cheng Yi, Zhang Yuxi, Zhou Zhennan, Zhou Yutong, Song Yi, Zhang Wanyi, Gulnazar	Stand by Me (Dream of Changan)
4 September	Xu Weizhou, Qiao Xin, Jam Hsiao, Wang Qiang, Gulnazar	The Romance
11 September	Zhao Liying, Yang Di, Yu Yang	

== Awards ==
Year	Award	Category	Ref.
1998	The 16th China TV Golden Eagle Awards	Variety Show Award	
2005	New Weekly 2004 Chinese TV Program Ranking	3rd Most Valuable Chinese TV Programs in the past 15 years	
2007	Tencent Star Awards 2007	Most popular variety show of the year	
2008	The 13th Asian Television Awards	Best Variety Show	
2009	Annual China top-rated TV entertainment program	Google 's most search variety show	
2010	The First China University Student Television Festival	The most watched entertainment program among college students	
2011	The Second National Excellent Television Culture (Literary) Column and Large-scale Special Program Recommendation and Recognition	Excellent columns in literature, entertainment and sports	
2014	New Weekly 2013 China TV List	China TV Chart 15th Anniversary Honor Award	
