= Li Weijia =

Chinese host and actor

- 李维嘉
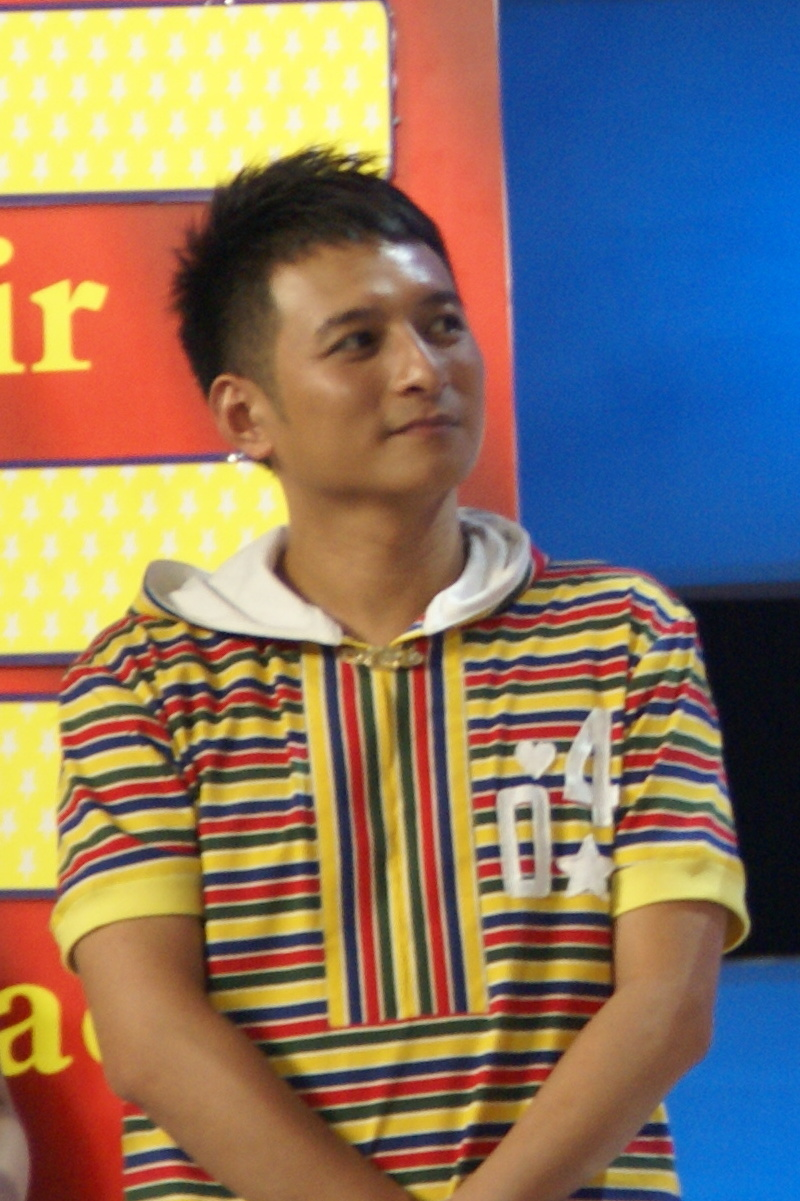
- Li Weijia in 2009
- Born: 4 November 1976 (age 49); Changsha, Hunan, China
- Other name: Vega (维嘉)
- Education: Communication University of Zhejiang
- Occupations: Host, actor
- Years active: 2004 - present
- Known for: Happy Camp
- Television: Hunan TV

Li Weijia (simplified Chinese: 李维嘉; traditional Chinese: 李維嘉; pinyin: Lǐ Wéijiā; born 4 November 1976), also named Vega (维嘉), is a Chinese host and actor. He is the co-host of the TV program Happy Camp which airs on Hunan Satellite TV with fellow hosts He Jiong, Xie Na, Du Haitao, and Wu Xin.

== Biography ==
Li was born in Changsha, Hunan on 4 November 1976. He is a graduate of the Communication University of Zhejiang.

== Works ==
=== TV Series ===
Year	Chinese title	English title	Role	Costar	Ref
2004	律政佳人		Boy	Miu Yong	
2006	暗夜心慌慌		Xiao Siyuan	Ma Ke, Liu Yihan	
2008	丑女无敌	Yo soy Betty, la fea	Xie Er'ran	Liu Xin, Wu Qijiang, Mao Junjie	
2009	美女不坏	Beauty is Not Bad	Host	Xie Na, Guo Pinchao, Evonne Hsu	
2012	花开半夏			Miao Qiaowei, Yang Yang, Lin Shen	

=== Film ===
Year	Chinese title	English title	Role	Costar	Ref
2010	嘻游记		Student Lü	He Jiong, Xie Na, Wu Xin	
2013	快乐大本营之快乐到家	Bring Happiness Home	Wei Jiasi	He Jiong, Xie Na, Wu Xin, Du Haitao	
2014	201413	Forever Love			

=== Animated film ===
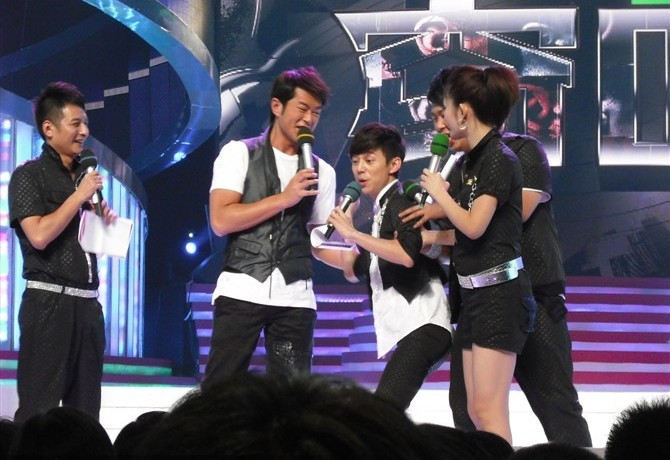
Happy Camp, 2009. Li Weijia is first from the left.

Year	Chinese title	English title	Role	Ref
2007	美食总动员	Ratatouille		
2009	快乐奔跑			
2009	虹猫蓝兔火凤凰			
2011	熊猫总动员			
