= Wu Xin =

Chinese actress and television host

- 吴昕
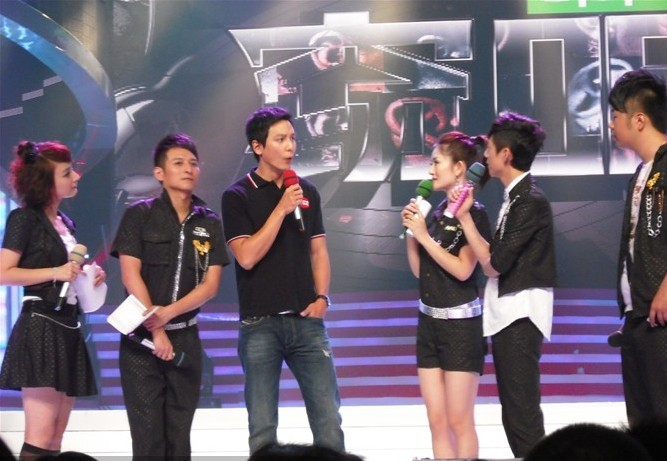
- Wu Xin (farthest left) interviewing Daniel Wu (third from left) along with co-hosts (from left) Li Weijia, Xie Na, He Jiong and Du Haitao
- Born: January 29, 1983 (age 43); Shenyang, Liaoning, China
- Other name: Orfila
- Education: Dalian University of Foreign Language
- Occupations: Television presenter; Actress; Model; Businesswoman
- Years active: 2003–present
- Agents: Hunan TV (2006-2021); EE-Media (2022-)

Chinese name
- Traditional Chinese: 吳昕
- Simplified Chinese: 吴昕
Transcriptions
Standard Mandarin
- Hanyu Pinyin: Wú Xīn

Wu Xin (Chinese: 吴昕; born 29 January 1983), also known by her English name Orfila (Chinese: 奥尔菲拉), is a Chinese television host, actress, model and businesswoman famous for co-hosting the variety show Happy Camp on Hunan Satellite TV from 2006 to 2021.

== Biography ==
Wu Xin was born in Shenyang, Liaoning on January 29, 1983. She attended Northeast Yucai School and Shenyang 120 High School (沈阳市第120中学), and graduated from Dalian University of Foreign Language, where she majored in French Language.

In June 2003, Dalian TV was scouting for a part-time host from local colleges for its fashion show, and Wu signed up for the interview with encouragement from her teacher, successfully winning the role.

In September 2005, Wu applied for Hunan TV's write-in ballot show Shining New Host (闪亮新主播) for selecting new hosts for its flagship variety show Happy Camp after one of the show's original hosts, Li Xiang, decided to leave the show in 2004 and get married. Wu won second place in the final round in November, behind fellow Shenyang host Du Haitao, and was subsequently inducted as a new co-host of the restructured Happy Camp in 2006. Nicknamed the "Northeastern Hepburn" for her good looks, she would stay as one of the show's five ensemble hosts along with He Jiong, Li Weijia, Xie Na and Du Haitao, collectively known as the "Happy Family" (快乐家族), until the show was cancelled in 2021.

Outside of her Hunan TV host career, Wu also performed supporting roles in a number of films and television series, as well as being a guest host/participant/performer in other variety and game shows. Outside of the entertainment industry, she is also an accomplished entrepreneur who owns eight franchised Thai restaurants in Hunan, Guangdong, Tianjin and Shanxi, and is a leading e-commerce celebrity endorser of fashion products on RedNote.

== Filmography ==
=== Film ===
Year	Chinese title	English title	Role	Ref
2010	嘻游记	Xi You Ji	Wu Xin	
2013	快乐到家	Happy Home	Guai Guai	
2013	爱神	To Love God	Qian Qian	
2013	一路狂奔	Running All the Way	Charity company employee	Cameo
2014	北回归线	South of the Clouds	Mimi	
2015	探灵档案	Blind Spot	Liu Xinyuan	
2016	恭喜发财之谈钱说爱	Money and Love	Aibao Nanny	
2016	看见我和你	See You I See Me!	Bai Xin	
2017	仙球大戰	Soccer Killer	Thief	Cameo

=== Animated film ===
Year	Chinese title	English title	Role	Ref
2009	快乐奔跑	Running Freely	Luo Mi	
2009	虹猫蓝兔火凤凰	Mao Tu: Phoenix Rising	Sha Li	
2011	熊猫总动员	Little Big Panda	Madame Huang	

=== Television series ===
Year	Chinese title	English title	Role	Ref
2006	爱情魔方	Magic Recipe of Love	Xiaoxin	Cameo
2009	校园恰恰恰	Campus Hahaha	Niece	Cameo
2009	美女不坏	Beauty is Not Bad	News reporter	Cameo
2011	倾世皇妃	The Glamorous Imperial Concubine	Court maid	Cameo
2013	落跑甜心	Runaway Sweetheart	Fang Li	Cameo
2016	家年华	Jia Nian Hua		Cameo
2017	深夜食堂	Midnight Diner	Customer	Cameo
2019	爱上北斗星男友	Destiny's Love	Cai Shumeng	
2019	推手	Pushing Hands	Cao Fei	
2019	亮剑之雷霆战将	Lightning Fighters		

=== Variety show ===
Year	Chinese title	English title	Role	Notes	Ref
2006–present	快乐大本营	Happy Camp	Host		
2010	我是大美人	Queen	Host		
2015	极速前进中国版2	The Amazing Race 2	Cast member	Winner along with Han Geng	
2016	作战吧偶像	The Collaboration	Host		
2016	我的新衣	My New Wardrobe	Host		
2017	爱in思谈	R=A (1-SINE)	Host		
2017	我們相愛吧	We Are In Love	Cast member	Paired with Will Pan	
2020	乘风破浪的姐姐	Sisters Who Make Waves	Contestant		

== Bibliography ==
English title	Chinese title	Notes
Tumurijin	木土日斤	
