= Zhu Rongjun =

Chinese singer and online streamer

- 朱容君
- Born: 31 May 1990 (age 35); Liuzhou, Guangxi, China
- Occupation(s): Singer, online streamer
- Years active: 2015—present

Zhu Rongjun (Chinese: 朱容君; born 31 May 1990), widely known as Tuzi Ya, is a Chinese singer and online streamer. She joined KuGou Streaming in 2015 and has since released many singles, including "Little White Rabbit Meets Cappuccino" and "18-line Letter Written for You".

Rongjun has achieved fame as a singer on the short video platform and well-deserved as "Queen of Music Short Video Traffic". She won the "Popular New Singer of the Year" award in the 9th Pop Music Gold List.

== Career ==
She began to sing live on KuGou Live at the end of 2015. As early as the first year of her residency, she won the Best Image Award and the Best Popular King at the 2016 Kugou Live Music Festival. She became a contracted singer on the KuGou Live Broadcast. She began to try to release her original single, which is integrated into the popular short video. "Starry April" is her first representative work released in January 2017.

In February 2018, she attended the 2017 Kugou Live Music Festival and won the third runner-up award. In mid-September 2018, she became famous on all major short video platforms with a string of song "Little White Rabbit Meets Cappuccino". She brought related songs on fire, and it skyrocketed 16 million fans in just six months. On 25 December, she won the fourth place in the final of the 2018 Kugou Live Music Festival.

Beginning of 2019, she participated in the Hunan TV variety show "Happy Camp". In May 2019, she joined as a star team manager in the second season of the Zhejiang Television reality show "Iron Armored Ambition", a national weekly ratings record for Chinese science and technology programs, and also received a high score of 8.4 points on Douban. On May 6, she attended the Ninth Annual Pop Music Full Gold Chart Annual Ceremony and won the "Mainland Popular New Singer of the Year Award".
