= Happy Hotel =

- Film poster
- Traditional Chinese: 樂翻天
- Simplified Chinese: 乐翻天
- Hanyu Pinyin: Lèfāntiān
- Directed by: Wang Yuelun
- Written by: Wang Yuelun
- Produced by: Song Guangcheng; Li Xiang
- Starring: Jiang Wu; Ning Jing
- Cinematography: Chen Ying
- Music by: DJ Hunter
- Production companies: Xingguang International Media Group; Mango Films; Beijing Da'an Film Culture Media
- Distributed by: Beijing Enlight Pictures
- Release date: 2 August 2012
- Running time: 90 minutes
- Country: China
- Language: Mandarin

Happy Hotel (Chinese: 乐翻天) is a 2012 Chinese comedy film directed and written by Wang Yuelun and produced by Song Guangcheng and Li Xiang. It stars Jiang Wu as Qian Shiqiang, the vice-president of a company, along with Ning Jing as his wife. The film premiered in China on August 2, 2012. The film follows the lives of a couple and their networking at a five-star hotel named Lotte Hotel.

== Plot ==
Meng Jinghua (Ning Jing) has never been pregnant after her marriage with Qian Shiqiang (Jiang Wu). She has quietly contacts a Korean doctor to come to Lotte Hotel for treatment. That same time, Kim Tai-shun (Jeon Kyeong-ho), a Korean creditor, comes to China for debt, he is arranged to Lotte Hotel by his debtor President Xi (Yao Lu). When he meets Meng Jinghua, he thinks that Meng is a masseuse. On the other hand, Meng Jinghua thinks that Kim Tai-shun is the Korean doctor and invites him to her room. When Kim Tai-shun is flirting with Meng Jinghua, he is battered unconscious by Meng. Meng flees the hotel with deeply fearful, and asks her husband Qian Shiqiang for help. But her husband is caught in bed with his lover Katy (Meng Tongdi) by President Xi. President Xi demands Qian Shiqiang to give him one million yuan as hush money. Qian Shiqiang decides to borrow money from his friends to solve this trouble. The couple meets in the elevator.

== Cast ==
- Jiang Wu as Qian Shiqiang, the vice-president of a company.
- Ning Jing as Meng Jinghua, the president of a company.
- Jeon Kyeong-ho as Kim Tai-shun
- Meng Tongdi as Katy, Qian Shiqiang's lover.
- Liu Hua as President Liu
- Yao Lu as President Xi
- Lam Chi-chung as Du Dachang
- Du Haitao as Liang Wen
- Huang Yi as Meng Jinghua's close friend
- Cheung Tat-ming as Han Chenghuan
- Linda Liao as Xing Guang'ai

== Production ==
Shooting began in September 2011 and ended in June 2012.

The film pays homage to Tony Basgallop's Hotel Babylon.

== Release ==
The film was released on August 2, 2012, in China.

== Reception ==
Douban gave the film 5.2 out of 10 and Mtime gave it 5.6 out of 10.

== Accolades ==
At the 2012 4th Macau International Movie Festival Ning Jing was nominated for Best Actress.
