= Du Haitao =

Chinese television host and actor

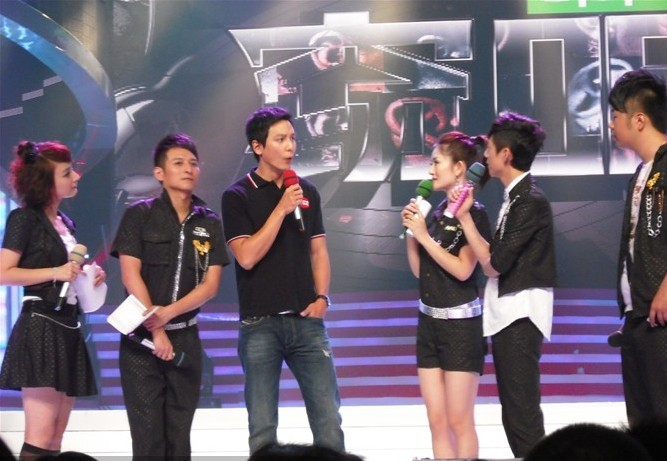
- Happy Camp, 2009
- Born: October 28, 1987 (age 38); Shenyang, Liaoning, China
- Occupations: Television host, actor

Du Haitao (simplified Chinese: 杜海涛; traditional Chinese: 杜海濤; pinyin: Dù Hǎitāo) (born 28 October 1987) is a Chinese television host and actor. Du is known for hosting the Hunan TV variety show Happy Camp.

== Career ==
In 2005, Du competed in the Hunan TV hosting competition Shining New Anchor. Winning the competition in 2006, Du, along with runner-up Wu Xin, joined Happy Camp as a host, with existing members He Jiong, Xie Na, and Li Weijia, forming the Happy Family. The same year, Du hosted the education program Tong Xin Zhuang Di Qiu (Chinese: 童心撞地球) for the cartoon department of Hunan TV.

In 2009, Du, together with Wu Xin, authored the memoir Tu Mu Ri Xin (Chinese 木土日斤), documenting their early experiences working for Happy Camp. The title name of the novel is a word play on their names.

In 2013, Du and the Happy Family starred in the comedy film Bring Happiness Home. In 2015, Du featured on the variety show Takes a Real Man on Hunan TV.

In 2020, Du featured on the third season of the Tencent Video dating show the Heart Signal.

== Personal life ==
Since Du began hosting Happy Camp, it was rumored that Du had been dating Wu Xin; the two later dismissed the rumors. In 2011, Du began dating Li Ruoxi. Since 2016, Du has been in a relationship with model and actress Shen Mengchen.

On 18 February 2022, Du married Shen Mengchen.

== Filmography ==
=== Films ===
Year	English Title	Chinese title	Role	Director	Costar
2018	The Best Ex-boyfriend				
2016	Mad Monk Ji Gong				
2016	Money and Love	恭喜发财之谈钱说爱			
2016	The Family Running Forward	一家老小向前冲			
2016	For Love	致我们终将到来的爱情	Ma Xiao Qiang 马小强	Zheng Lai Zhi 郑来志	Li Feier 李菲儿, Huang Ming 黄明
2015	Bride Wars	新娘大作战			
2015	Bloody Destiny	拳霸风云			
2015	The Unbearable Lightness of Inspector Fan	暴走神探			
2014	But Always	一生一世			
2014	Fall in Love with You	这个大叔不太囧			
2014	Forever Young	怒放之青春再见			
2014	Husband and Wife Game	夫妻游戏			
2014	Forever Love	201413			
2013	Dating Fever	我为相亲狂			
2013	Kidnapping of a Big Star	绑架大明星			
2013	Running All the Way	一路狂奔			
2013	Bring Happiness Home	快乐大本营之快乐到家			
2013	The King of Comedy	喜剧王	Male Apprentice	Tang Yu (唐昱)	Sun Xing (孙兴)，Lv Kongwei（吕孔维）
2012	Little Man	美男记			
2012	Substitute Millionaire	做次有钱人			
2012	Happy Hotel	乐翻天			
2011	Love in Space	全球热恋	Cameo role	Chen Guohui (陈国辉), Xia Yongkang (夏永康)	Chen Yixun (陈奕迅), Angelababy
2011	Big Big Man	大人物	Cameo role	Tan Hua (谭华)	Wu Mengda (吴孟达), Jin Sha（金莎）
2010	Xi You Ji	嘻游记	Li Dashao (李大勺)	Zhong Shaoxiong (钟少雄)	Xie Na (谢娜), He Jiong (何炅)
2009	Radish Warrior	倔强萝卜	Luo Yi (罗毅)	Tian Meng (田蒙)	Huang Bo (黄渤)

=== Television ===
Year	English Title	Chinese title	Role	Director	Costar
2014	Miss Dong	懂小姐			Liu Ye (刘烨), Zhang Xiaolong (张晓龙)
2014	iPartment 4	爱情公寓4		Wei Zheng (韦正)	Chen He (陈赫), Lou Yixiao (娄艺潇)
2012	Sport Fat Man	运动飞侠		Hu Chuxi (胡储玺)	Wu Mengda (吴孟达)
2011	The Glamorous Imperial Concubine	倾世皇妃	Waiter (店小二)	Liang Xinquan (梁辛全), Lin Feng (林峰)	Ruby Lin (林心如), Wallace Huo (霍建华), Wu Xin (吴昕)
2011	Loose sweetheart	落跑甜心	Lu Fuzhi (陆甫之)	Wang Mingtai (王明台)	Chen Xiang (陈翔), Wu Yi (武艺)
2009	Campus Just Just	校园恰恰恰		Zeng Jianfeng (曾剑锋)	
2009	Beauty not bad	美女不坏		Jin Shuhui (金姝慧)	Xie Na (谢娜), Xu Huixin (许慧欣)

== Books ==
Muturijin（木土日斤） 2009

== Music composition ==
Albums: Happiness you understand (快乐你懂的) Released: 25 September 2010 Personal single song: Tomboy

== External ==
Du Haitao on Weibo
