= Linda Liao =

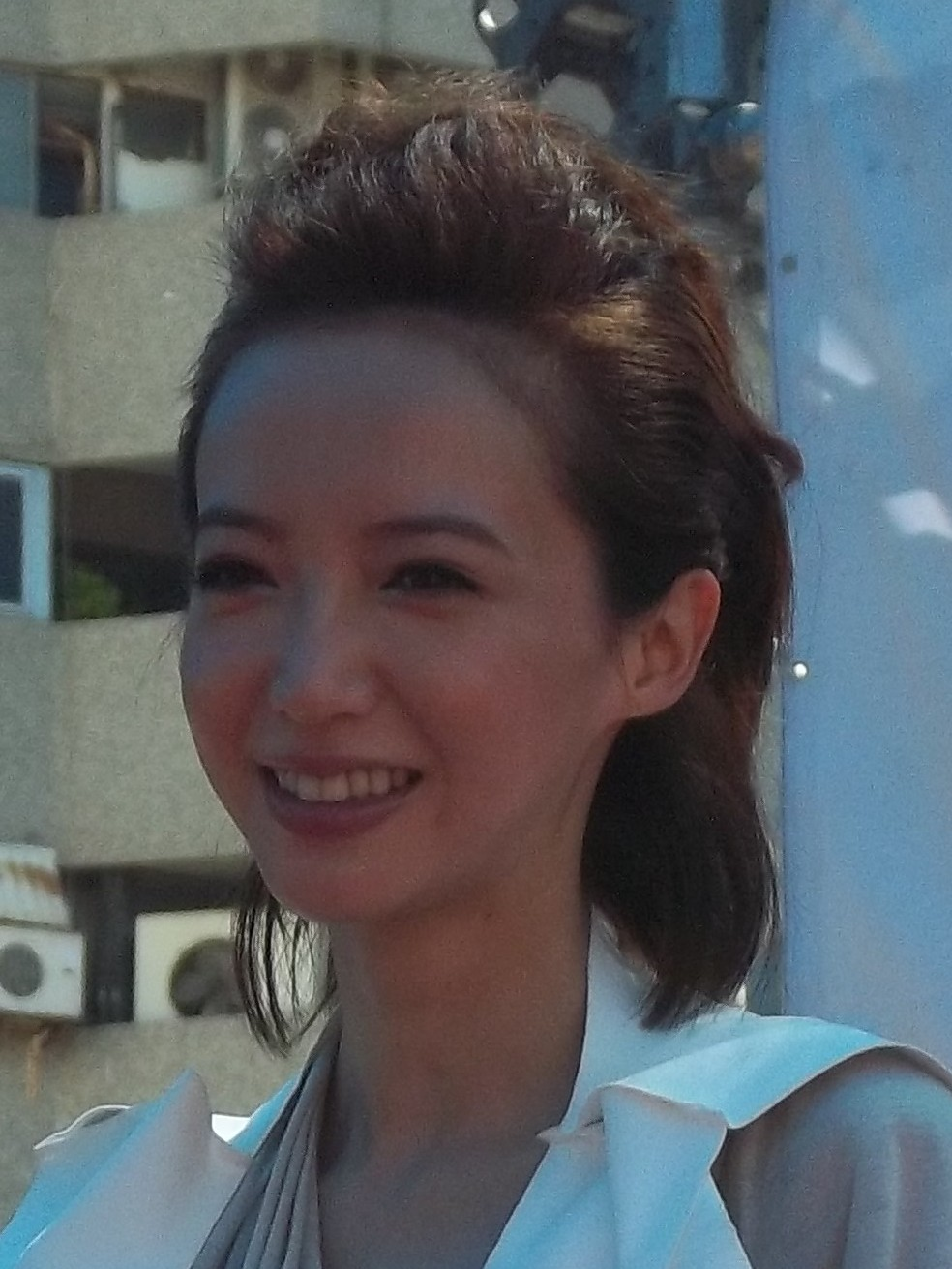
- Liao in Tainan, 2011
- Born: 廖佩伶; 24 May 1981 (age 44)
- Occupations: Singer, actress, VJ, professional gamer
- Years active: 2000–present
- Musical career
- Also known as: 廖語晴
- Genres: Pop
- Instrument: Vocals

Linda Liao (Chinese: 廖佩伶; pinyin: Liào Pèi Líng, now known as 廖語晴; born 24 May 1981) is a Taiwanese singer, actress and VJ. She is known as a professional gamer for StarCraft II. She attended Queen's University in Kingston, Ontario, Canada.

== Discography ==
=== Studio albums ===
- 2002 August – Linda 7
- 2004 June – 我挺你
- 2011 May 27 – Love Presents 爱。现

== Filmography ==
=== Film ===
Year	Title	Original title	Role	Note
2005	Fishing Luck	等待飛魚	Li Ching-ching	
2011	Twisted	撞鬼	Linda	
2012	Kepong Gangster	甲洞	Auntie	
2012	Hello, Thank You	你好。謝謝	Linda	Short film
2012	Happy Hotel	乐翻天	Xing Guang'ai	
2014	One in Five Chance	五分之一的遭遇	Chin	Short film

=== Television series ===
Year	Title	Original title	Role
2005	Chase	Chase	Ellie Chua
2006	The Hospital	白色巨塔	Kang Wen Li
2007	After Hours	After Hours	Ellie Chua
2007	My Best Pals	櫻野三加一	Joyce
2009	ToGetHer	愛就宅一起	Chen Chu Chu
2009	Bling Days	閃亮的日子	Xiang Qian Qian
2010	Endless Love	愛∞無限	Zhao Bi Yun
2011	They Are Flying	飛行少年	Zhuang Xiao Li
2012	Hottie One on One	辣妹釘孤枝	Tu Li-hsiang
