= Forever Love (2014 film) =

- Poster
- Directed by: Zhao Yiran; Wei Jie
- Story by: Story of about three couples whose love for one another is tested by the lure of winning a huge amount of money.
- Production companies: Beijing Fuyu Century Media Co., Ltd; Guangxi Films Group Co., Ltd; Guangxi Xinnonghe Investment Co., Ltd; Beijing Baisi Bida Marketing Planning Co., Ltd
- Release date: January 1, 2014 (China)
- Running time: 91 minutes
- Country: China
- Language: Mandarin
- Box office: ¥0.54 million (China)

Forever Love (Chinese: 201413) is a 2014 Chinese romantic comedy-drama film directed by Zhao Yiran and Wei Jie. It was released in China on January 1, 2014.

== Cast ==
- Li Weijia
- Jiang Chao
- Teddy Lin
- Du Haitao
- Liu Mengmeng
- Xia Yiyao
- Shen Tingting
- Peng Bo

== Reception ==
The film earned ¥0.54 million at the Chinese box office.
