= The Ultimate Task =

- Film poster
- Chinese: 终极大冒险
- Directed by: Sun Lijun
- Written by: Li Wenxian; Peng Lu; Niu Bosi; Yang Lei; Zhu Yunxiao
- Produced by: Bao Yanli; Fan Yunming; Kong Qi; Wang Zhen; Xie Xiangning; Xue Jiajing; Zhang Huijun; Zhang Xu
- Music by: Long Long; Tian Liang
- Production companies: Beijing Film Academy; Hunan Aniworld Cartoon Co., Ltd; Beijing Aiyi Meixun Animation Production Co., Ltd; Huaxia Film Distribution Co., Ltd; Beijing Iqiyi Co., Ltd; Beijing Bihe Shijia Media Co., Ltd
- Distributed by: Huaxia Film Distribution Co., Ltd.
- Release date: 20 July 2013
- Running time: 85 minutes
- Country: China
- Language: Mandarin
- Box office: CN¥4.46 million

The Ultimate Task (Chinese: 终极大冒险), also known as Fantastic Adventure, is a 2013 Chinese animated adventure comedy drama film directed by Sun Lijun. It was released on July 20, 2013.

== Voice cast ==
- Xie Na
- Lu Zhixing
- Han Tongsheng
- Wang Jinsong
- Li Yang
- Liu Jing
- Yang Yifei

== Reception ==
The film earned CN¥4.46 million at the Chinese box office.
