= Amguulan =

Chinese singer and songwriter (born 1984)

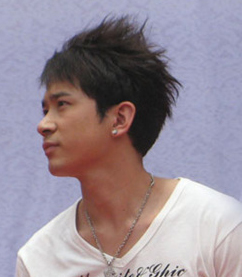
- Performing in 张家界, 2007
- Born: Amguulan; August 30, 1984 (age 41); Plain and Bordered White Banner (正镶白旗), Xilin Gol League (锡林郭勒盟), Inner Mongolia, China
- Occupations: Singer songwriter actor
- Years active: 2007–present
- Musical career
- Also known as: Amu, Amulong
- Genres: Mandopop; C-Pop; Mongolian Pop; Pop rock
- Instruments: Vocals; Throat Singing (a.k.a. Khöömii or 呼麦); Morin Khuur (a.k.a. Horse-head fiddle or 马头琴); Guitar
- Labels: Shanghai EE-Media Co. Ltd. Seed Music Co., Ltd.
- Website: amguulan.com

Amguulan (阿穆隆) (born August 30, 1984), commonly known as Amulong or Amu, is a Chinese singer and songwriter of Mongolian descent. He competed in the 2007 edition of the singing competition show Super Boy on Hunan Television.

== Filmography ==
Year	Film	Role	Notes
2008	八十一格 (Sudoku)	陈默 (Chen Mo)	Lead role
2009	乐火男孩	郑直 (Zheng Zhi)	
