= Yao Zhen =

Chinese biologist and oncologist

Yao Zhen (Chinese: 姚錱; a.k.a. T. Yao; 18 October 1915 – 4 November 2005) was a Chinese biologist and oncologist. He served the first president of Asian-Pacific Organization for Cell Biology.

== Life ==
Yao was born in Changshu, Jiangsu Province, on 18 October 1915. Yao graduated from the Department of Biology of Zhejiang University in 1937. After graduation, he became a teaching assistant at the department. Yao received a scholarship from British Council and went to study in UK in 1946. Yao obtained PhD from the University of Edinburgh in 1949.

Yao jointed the former Shanghai Institute of Experimental Biology, Chinese Academy of Sciences (CAS) in August 1950. He was the vice-director of the former CAS Shanghai Institute of Cell Biology.

Yao was elected an academician of the Chinese Academy of Sciences in 1980. In August 1988, Yao was elected the 1st president of Asian-Pacific Organization for Cell Biology.

Yao was the main founder and the first editor-in-chief of the scientific journal Cell Research.

Yao also served as the chief director of Chinese Society for Cell Biology. Yao was a senior research professor at Shanghai Institute of Biochemistry and Cell Biology (SIBCB), Chinese Academy of Sciences, which is one of the most prestigious institutes for biological research in China.

When Yao was in Britain, his research mainly focused on the developmental embryology of drosophila. Yao made significant contributions to the researches of cell differentiation and development, and experimental cancer biology in China, thus is regarded as a pioneer in these domains in China.

Yao died in Shanghai on 4 November 2005.

== Names ==
Yao Zhen's name is often incorrectly written as Yao Xin, because the Chinese character Zhen (錱) is often mistaken as the more common character Xin (鑫). His name is also romanized as T. Yao.
