= Chen Chusheng =

Chinese singer-songwriter (born 1981)

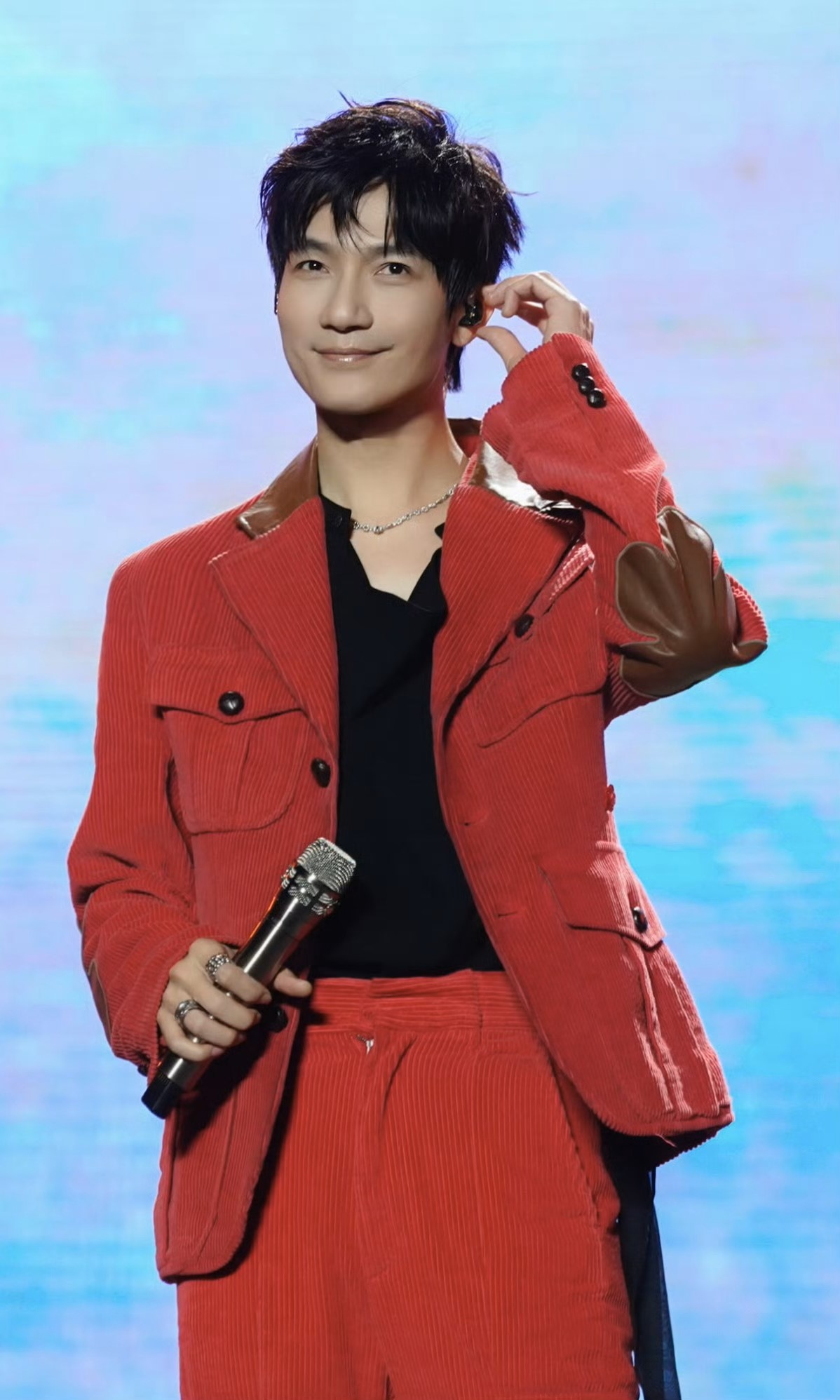
- Chen Chusheng in 2024
- Born: July 25, 1981 (age 44); Sanya, Hainan, China
- Occupations: Singer; Singer-songwriter; Record producer; Guitarist; Actor
- Years active: 2003–present

Chinese name
- Traditional Chinese: 陳楚生
- Simplified Chinese: 陈楚生
Transcriptions
Standard Mandarin
- Hanyu Pinyin: Chén Chǔshēng (Chen Shu Sheng)
Yue: Cantonese
- Jyutping: Can4 Co2 Saang1
- Musical career
- Origin: Puning, Guangdong
- Genres: Mandopop; Pop; rock
- Instrument: Guitar
- Labels: EE-Media (2007–2009); Huayi Brothers Music (2009–present)

Chen Chusheng (born July 25, 1981) is a Chinese singer.

== Early life ==
Chen was born in Sanya, Hainan. His family is originally from Puning, Chaoshan (Teohchew area) Guangdong. Since childhood, he has been interested in playing guitar and singing. He is also good at sports like Kungfu, soccer, and fishing. During high school, he played and sang in the nearby pub on weekends. In 2000, aged 19, Chen moved to Shenzhen to explore opportunities. Starting off with working in a restaurant run by his relatives, he soon concentrated on developing a singing career – meeting musicians in the same camp and performing for clubs in town.

== Career ==
With his singing skills developed, Chen took chances to participate in some music programmes and competitions, and was highly acclaimed by the audiences. In 2001, Chen won the Most Potential award at the MTV Asia Awards, held in Shanghai. In 2003, he was awarded the champion title of the National Pub Singer Competition, held in Changsha, Hunan, and signed with EMI. In 2007, he was crowned "Super Boy" champion, and signed with E.E. Media. It was confirmed in January 2009, however, Chen broke up with the management firm, which he accused of inappropriate publicisation of his private life for the purpose of raising his profile. After being kept busy with his dispute contract court case and being away from singing exposure, he spent time out most of his career and was pretty low key and in some ways, "shunned" by the music media. By fate of luck, he was called up as a quick replacement contestant in the Chinese singing competition series Singer 2019 ep 11 and came in 4th place but left a deep impression of his singing talent and style, to all present there, including those well known participating singers. From thereon, his popularity took a turn and soared even more and he appeared in many TV shows across China. His humbleness, singing arrangement and voice stand out amongst many other singers and these singers would liked to choose and duet with him.

=== Has Anyone Told You ===
E.E. Media released an album in July 2007, 13, for the top 13 contestants of "Super Boy" of the year, containing Chen's debut single Has Anyone Told You《有没有人告诉你》.

=== I'm actually not alone along the way ===
In November 2007, his first own EP of I'm actually not alone along the way《原来我一直都不孤单》 was released, containing three originals I'm actually not alone along the way, Has Anyone Told You《有没有人告诉你》 and Search《寻找》, in addition to a new song La La La《啦啦啦》 and a cover Sing by British band "Travis".

== Discography ==
=== Studios albums ===
Album	Album Information	Track listing
From Winter to Spring (冬去春来)	* Released: December 28, 2009 * Label : Huayi Brothers Music |	Track listing: 1. 一个人唱情歌; 2. 我不是我自己; 3. 奇幻之旅; 4. 某某; 5. 离开; 6. 想哭; 7. 不想长大; 8. 无话可说; 9. 一个人的好天气; 10. 鱼乐圈; 11. 明天; 12. 且听风吟
Legend of Shadow (影之传说)	* Released: December 22, 2010 * Label : Huayi Brothers Music	Track listing: 1. 风起时，想你; 2. 相忘于江湖; 3. 想念; 4. 丹书铁契; 5. 她们; 6. 山楂花; 7. 梦中的蔷薇; 8. 泾渭; 9. 浮光; 10. 男孩的梦
Yin (癮)	* Date : February 2, 2012 * Released: Huayi Brothers Music	Track listing: 1. 追風箏的孩子; 2. 癮 3. 愛情是否依然; 4. 阿福; 5. 愛那麼自然; 6. 橡皮人; 7. 顏色; 8. 我的女孩; 9. 思念一個荒廢的名字; 10. 剪刀石頭布
I Know You Are Not Far From Me (我知道你離我不遠)	* Released: June 10, 2013 * Label : Huayi Brothers Music	Track listing: 1. 我知道你離我不遠; 2. 擁抱的溫暖; 3. 焦點; 4. 快樂不過是做你想做的而已; 5. 裝睡的人; 6. 黃金時代; 7. 無知無覺; 8. 西湧客棧; 9. 菲菲
Spy.C (偵探C)	* Released: March 29, 2017 * Label : StreetVoice	Track listing: 1. 偵探C; 2. Nice; 3. 先這樣吧; 4. 秘密; 5. 來來回回; 6. 35; 7. 辯證關系; 8. 怪客; 9. 最後我們都一樣; 10. 空
Journey to the Light (趨光)	* Released: June 28, 2019 * Label : Universal Music	Track listing: 1. 趨光號; 2. 落日旅館; 3. 我好想你; 4. 離群的鹿; 5. 荒廢光年; 6. 好久不見; 7. 八心八箭; 8. 恍惚; 9. 再見; 10. 你還好嗎
Doodle Forest (涂鸦森林)	* Released: July 25, 2021 * Label : CVE Music	Track listing: 1. 涂鸦森林; 2. 我等待的; 3. 隔壁阿丑; 4. 我的世界; 5. 打印人生; 6. 我的衣裳; 7. 晓得; 8. 白石洲

=== Live albums ===
Album	Album Information	Track listing
1/7 Concert Live (七分之一的理想)	* Released: July 25, 2018 * Label : Universal Music	Track listing: 1. 一夜; 2. 有没有人告诉你; 3. 西涌客栈/思念一个荒废的名字; 4. 追风筝的孩子; 5. 阿福; 6. 35; 7. 秘密; 8. 装睡的人; 9. 瘾 10. 原来我一直都不孤单

=== Extended play ===
Album	Album Information	Track listing
I've Never Been Alone (原来我一直都不孤单)	* Released: November 5, 2007 * Label : EE-Media	Track listing: 1. 寻找; 2. Sing; 3. La La La; 4. 原来我一直都不孤单; 5. 有没有人告诉你
Green Surging (绿动)	* Released: June 12, 2010 * Label : Huayi Brothers Music	Track listing: 1. 绿动; 2. 她们; 3. 想念
The Unforgettable (忘不了)	* Released: August 7, 2020 * Label : Universal Music	Track listing: 1. 忘不了; 2. 吻别; 3. 棋子; 4. 冷雨夜; 5. 来生缘

== Filmography ==
- China Idol Boys (乐火男孩) (2009)
- New Perfect Two (新天生一对) (2012)
- Midnight Radio Station of Kangqiao (康桥的午夜电台) (2012)
- Transformation (蜕变) (2012)
- Weak Birds Rush Forward (衰鸟向前冲) (2013)
- Oh My God (从天儿降) (2015)
- Forever Young (無問西東) (2018)
- Let Life Be Beautiful (再见吧！少年) (2020)

== Philanthropy ==
For a short film promoting charitable activities in Guizhou, produced by SZTV in 2002, Chen sang the theme song Kids in the Mountains《大山的孩子》.
