= Su Xing =

Chinese singer, songwriter and actor (born 1984)

Allen Su Xing
- Born: March 5, 1984 (age 41); Xi'an, China
- Education: SAE University College Sydney
- Occupation(s): Singer, Songwriter, Talk Show Emcee
- Years active: 2007–Present
- Notable work: 秋天 | Autumn, 晚安亲爱的 | Good Night Baby, 怕爱 | Love No More, 北京City | Beijing City, 破亿 | 100000000+, 爱人 | Lover, 分裂 | Split, 下次再玩 | See You Next Time, Miss Pretty, Dream, 心世界 | New World, Rising Land
- Spouse: Liao Yu Chen
- Musical career
- Also known as: Allen Su
- Origin: Xi'an
- Genres: C-pop, R&B, Hip Hop, Rap
- Labels: Record Label(s): EE-Media (2007–2009); Sony Music (2009–2014); Starload Media (2015–present); Manage Label(s): EE-Media (2007–2013); Starload-Media (2014–present)

Su Xing (simplified Chinese: 苏醒; traditional Chinese: 蘇醒; pinyin: Sū Xǐng; Allen Su; born March 5, 1984) is a Chinese singer, songwriter and actor. He took the 2nd place in the 2007 Super Boy 快乐男声contest, which was a national singing contest for young male contestants held by Hunan Satellite Television. Although he was only 23 years old while participating in the contest, Allen appeared much more sophisticated than many other young men of his age. After winning second place in the contest, he released his first EP, including six brand new songs, of which two of them were written by Allen himself.

Born in Xi'an, the capital city of northwestern China's Shaanxi, Allen Su had always been an excellent student since childhood. When he was 17 years old, his parents sent him to Sydney to pursue his study. Allen managed to study business at Macquarie University, but soon he realized that he was not interested in business and what he really goes in for is music, so he transferred to SAE College Sydney to study in digital media. Allen came back to China to take part in the 2007 Super Boy contest with the simple thought of meeting people who could introduce him to record companies to help start his career, after the contest he went back to Sydney to finish his study, and achieved the Bachelor of Digital Media in 2008.

== Early life ==
Allen Su was born in a well-off family, his talent in arts was inherited from his mother, Miao Ni Ya, who worked in Shaanxi Normal University after her graduation. Although Ms Miao was not a specialist in arts, dancing and singing were among her many accomplishments. According to Ms Miao, Allen had learned piano for several months during his childhood, and his tutor appreciated his talent. However, the tutor ended the courses because the little Allen was too restless to sit by the piano for hours––at that time he enjoyed playing football instead of the piano.

Allen appeared independent, quick-minded and persistent since very young. Being active in various sports and arts, he was also an excellent student and managed to go to one of the best senior high schools in ShaanXi Province: Xi'an Middle School, his scores always ranked top of his grade. Of course Allen Su is not a typical bookish person as you might think of, among his wide range of interests, painting, ballgames and singing are the most significant brilliance, he used to dream of becoming a painter or a football player.

At the age of 17, Allen decided to study abroad, he went to Sydney all by his own to pursue his future. As most young boys, he didn't figure out what he really wished to do at first, so he followed his family's will to study business. Soon he found out business couldn't be his career, so he decisively transferred from Macquarie University to SAE College Sydney.

Life is tough, especially for a young boy living abroad alone, but he is the last one in the world to say "give up". Just as his name Allen--which was named after his idol Allen Iverson—suggests, it implies a great spirit of tenacity. Although his family could afford the tuition, he decided to work his way through college, he even took several part jobs at a time to lighten the burden of his family.

During the seven years in Australia, Allen had a small 4-person band with his close friends, and engaged in a couple of local singing contests.

== Music career ==
=== 2006: TVB8 New Talent Singing Awards ===
In 2006, Allen took part in the New Talent Singing Awards regional contest in Sydney for the 2nd time, he won the championship and got the chance to contest in International Finals in Hong Kong. He got the sixth place in the final.

Song	Original Singer
谁是MVP	Will Pan 潘玮柏
比我对你更好的人	Fengie Wang 汪佩蓉

=== 2007: Super Boy Contest ===
Allen's pursuit of his singing dream never stops. In 2007, he participated in the Super Boy contest organized by Hunan Satellite Television, his fans nationwide voted him the 2nd place in the final.

Date	Event	Song	Original Singer	Votes
07.04.18	西安赛区海选			
07.05.02	西安赛区50进10	Muzak	Boyz II Men	–
07.05.13	西安赛区10进1	Fill me in Truly Madly Deeply 爱你就等于爱自己	Craig David; Savage Garden; Leehom Wang 王力宏	65,814
07.05.25	13进11	Oh Oh	Guy Sebastian	–
07.06.01	11进9	妹妹 解脱; All the Way	Khalil Fong 方大同 李玖哲; Craig David	211,823
07.06.09	9进7	爱是怀疑	Eason Chan 陈奕迅	–
07.06.15	7进6	Fighter 被遗忘的时光	Christina Aguilera; Cai Qin 蔡琴	–
07.06.22	6进5	南泥湾 爱很简单 小镇姑娘	郭兰英; David Tao 陶喆; David Tao 陶喆	–
07.06.29	5进4	屋顶 心中的日月; Miss Independent 洗牌	Jay Chou 周杰伦; Leehom Wang 王力宏; Kelly Clarkson 李玖哲	–
07.07.06	4进3	我要你的爱; So Sick 我会好好过; Walking Away	阿朵; Ne-Yo 李玖哲; Craig David	1,217,681
07.07.13	3进2	Livin'La Vida Loca 还不是因为爱 勇气 爱的代价 朋友别哭	Ricky Martin; Allen Su 苏醒 梁静茹 张艾嘉 吕方	570,651
07.07.20	2进1	Supreme 爱如潮水&最美 三百六十五里路; Rock You; A Song for Mama 秋天	Robbie Williams 张信哲 & 羽泉 文章; Queen; Boyz II Men; Allen Su 苏醒	2,573,652

2007: Allen made his official debut and realised his 1st EP "Autumn".

2009: Allen won the "Most Popular Male Singer Award" at the China Radio, Film and Television Awards China Original Song Award Ceremony. He joined Sony Music (SonyMusic) in the same year.

2010: Allen released his 1st studio album "Longing" in May 2010. The title song "Missing You" won the Golden Melody Award at the annual Beijing Pop Music Ceremony and the Mainland Golden Melody Award on the Sprite Music Chart.

2011: Allen released his 2nd studio album in December 2011. The album "Present Tense" won the BQ2011 Best Album Award on the Popular Chart.

2012: Allen realised his 3rd studio album "New World" in November 2012. The song "Hero" in the album won the Golden Song of the year in the 20th Chinese POP Chart.

2014: January 2014 is the year which Allen established his own studio - Starload Media and formed the hip-hop rap group "Splitman Gang" with a group of young musicians who love music and pursue their dreams. This group adhere to the core concept of "KEEP IT FUKING REAL, WITH PASSION & SKILL". December 2014, Allen released his fourth studio album "Before 30" which consists purely of rap music.

2015: Allen released his 2nd creative EP "Let the World Listen" in April 2015. In December, Allen's 5th studio album "SOMEONE" was released.

2016: Allen released his 6th studio album "LOVER" in September 2016.

2017: Allen released his 7th studio hip-hop album "Stand Up Again" in November 2017. In the same year, he hosted the music reality show "Screaming Cara Show".

2019: Allen participated in the music travel reality show "Sing Tour" as a mentor.

2020: Allen joined the competition variety show "Shine! Super Brothers".

2022: Allen participated in a variety show "Welcome to the Mushroom House" in April 2022 with some participants from the Super Boy competition 2009. In December, Allen released his 8th studio album "Floating Life Like a Dream" in celebration of his 15th anniversary anthology.

2023: In August 2023, the "2023 WAKE UP Tour Concert" was launched. In October 2023, Allen participated in a music show "Singing with Legends 5th season".

2024: Allen participated and appeared LIVE on 2024 CCTV Spring Festival Gala stage. The Chinese Spring Festival Gala is the largest TV show in China, watched by almost every Chinese family on Chinese New Year's Eve, to say goodbye to the old year and welcome the new one. In June 2024, Airbnb appointed Allen as their Paris Olympic 2024 Cultural Ambassador. In the same month, Alipay appointed Allen as the UEFA Euro2024 Alipay Special Correspondent & Alipay International Recommendation Officer. The image of Allen in the promotional advertisement combines Alipay's technological sense with the passion of the European Cup, conveying a positive, relaxed and pleasant atmosphere, making "use Alipay when leaving the country" not only a practical suggestion, but also a lifestyle recommendation that encourages users to experience convenient payment services while enjoying the football feast.

== Discography ==
=== Studio albums ===
Album Type	Album Information	Brief Description	Track listing
1st Studio	Longing (想念·式): Released: May 11, 2010; Label: Sony Music; Languages: Mandarin, English	Allen's first original album '想念式' (Longing) was officially released on May 11, 2010, after three years of preparation. It contains a total of 10 songs. In this album '想念式', Allen personally composed lyrics and music for 7 songs, howcasing his songwriting skills for the first time."	Track listing: 1. 选秀明星 | Competition Star; 2. 一首想念的歌 | When You Hear This Song; 3. MISS PRETTY; 4. 后来你好吗 | After We Apart; 5. 1+1等于全世界 | Love World; 6. 想念式 | Missing You; 7. SO I SAY; 8. 浪漫旅程 | Sweet Journey; 9. 酷旋风 | Hot Flash; 10. 你最醒目 | You Are Shining
2nd Studio	Present Tense (进行式): Released: June 10, 2011; Label: Sony Music; Languages: Mandarin, English	The album '进行式' ('Present Tense') is Allen's creative work in 2011, released on June 28, 2011, containing a total of 11 songs."	Track-listing: 1. 怕爱 | Love No More; 2. Be My Lady; 3. 只谈心不贪心 | Friends Only; 4. I Will Be There For You; 5. 非偶像 | Non-idol; 6. 下次再玩 | See You Next Time; 7. 分裂 | Split; 8. 我还在唱歌 | I Am Singing Still; 9. Party Queen; 10. 假如爱是一种错 | If Love Is A Mistake; 11. 身旁 | I Will Be There For You
3rd Studio	New World (新故式): Released: October 22, 2012; Label: Sony Music; Languages: Mandarin, English	The album '新故式' ('New World') is the concluding part of Allen's R&B and HIP-HOP music trilogy, following '想念式' ('Longing') and '进行式' ('New World'). It's Allen's third personal album released after joining Sony Music, on October 22, 2012, featuring a total of 10 songs. Similar to the concluding part of any movie series or novel, this album serves as a summary of a phase, marking a milestone in Allen Su's musical journey. After the brewing and fermentation of the albums 'Longing' and 'Present Tense,' it showcases an even more distinctive 'Su-style' flavor."	Track listing: 1. 心世界 | New World; 2. 忽然之间 | Suddenly; 3. 对手 | Rival; 4. 情人节故事 | Story of Valentines' Day; 5. 轮廓 | Shape; 6. 兄弟 | Brother; 7. Hero; 8. 可惜 | Pity; 9. 武林盟主 | Master of Clam; 10. 晚安亲爱的 | Good Night Baby
4th Studio	Before 30 (三十未满): Released: December 24, 2014; Label: Starload Media; Languages: Mandarin, English	The album '三十未满' ('Before 30') marks Allen Su's debut hip-hop album, released on December 24, 2014, featuring a total of 14 songs."	Track listing: 1. The Announcement (Skit); 2. Splitman; 3. 北京 | City; 4. Future (Interlude); 5. 洋货; 6. The Break; 7. Walk Alone (Interlude); 8. 独行 | Walk Alone; 9. 星座女郎 | Star Girl; 10. 我太我 | Whatever; 11. Omnipotent (Skit); 12. 我不是歌手 | Not a Singer; 13. 有故事的女人 | Story of a Woman; 14. Dream
5th Studio	Someone: Released: December 15, 2015; Label: Starload Media; Languages: Mandarin, English	"Someone" continues the hip-hop rap and R&B blues style from the previous album while incorporating more melodic elements into the music. If the previous album, "Under Thirty," showcased Allen Su's fully developed independent musical style, "SOMEONE" represents a softer emotional return for Allen Su in terms of content. As Allen Su enters his thirties, there's a side of him that feels enlightened, yet there are also more aspects of life worth exploring. He approaches this with sincerity and openness, facing and embracing whatever comes his way.	Track listing: 1. Back Home; 2. 找个人; 3. Falling in Love; 4. 适者生存; 5. 放肆出发; 6. Sexy Girl; 7. 重生; 8. 学会爱; 9. 高清无码; 10. 跟着我旅行
6th Studio	Lover 爱人: Released: September 28, 2016; Label: Starload Media; Languages: Mandarin, English	Allen's latest pop creation album, "LOVER," not only incorporates elements of pop music but also blends in classical Chinese and blues elements, showcasing the romantic and beautiful side of Allen's love songs. This demonstrates his musical versatility, proving his ability to navigate the pop genre with ease.	Track listing: 1. 越来越近 | Closer; 2. 爱人 | Lover; 3. 彩虹 | Rainbow; 4. 蝶恋花 | Flower & Butterfly; 5. 外婆家 | Grandma's House; 6. 白雪歌 | White Snow; 7. 妈妈 | Mama; 8. 虞美人 | Beauty Yu; 9. 原地 | The Same Place; 10. 光芒 | The Light
7th studio	Stand Up Again: Released:November 30, 2017; Label: Starload Media; Languages: Mandarin, English	Allen Su's original hip-hop rap album, "Stand Up Again," was officially released on November 30, 2017. In this album, Allen Su not only presents the impact of society on individuals from a personal perspective but also transcends his own world. He takes on the role of an observer, interpreting the phenomena and essence of society. With a sense of mission, he speaks out against injustices and sings with a sense of responsibility for the times.	Track listing: 1. Stand Up Again; 2. Only You; 3. ALLEN请注意 | Pay Attention; 4. 破亿 | 100000000+; 5. 好久不见 | Long time no see 6. 男神 | Lord; 7. 巴黎恋人 | Paris lover 8. The Greatest Messi; 9. 小明 | Little Ming; 10. Losing Control
8th studio	浮生若梦: Released:December 28, 2022; Label: Starload Media; Languages: Mandarin, English	Allen Su's 15-year career retrospective physical album is divided into two CDs, "Melody" and "Beats," each featuring 15 songs categorized by melody and rap, respectively. These albums represent the highlights of Su Xing's music career, showcasing his journey as an artist comprehensively and all at once.	Track listing: 1. 怕爱 | Love No More; 2. 英雄 | Hero; 3. 秋天 | Autumn; 4. 下次再玩 | See You Next Time; 5. 身旁 | I'll Be There For You; 6. 找个人 | Someone; 7. 学会爱 | To Love; 8. 醒来说 | Wake Up To Talk; 9. Miss Pretty; 10. 想念式 | Missing You; 11. 光 | The Light; 12. 回忆失踪 | Missing Memory; 13. 更远的地方 | Somewhere Further; 14. Falling In Love; 15. 晚安亲爱的 | Good Night Baby; 16. 北京City | Beijing City; 17. 适者生存 | Survival; 18. Stand Up Again; 19. Dream; 20. Splitman; 21. The Break; 22. 洋货 | External; 23. 选秀明星 | Competition Star; 24. 分裂 | Split; 25. 心世界 | New World; 26. 我不是歌手 | Not A Singer; 27. 兄弟 | Brother; 28. Back Home; 29. 星座女郎 | Star Sign Girls; 30. Real Time 2020

=== EP ===
Album Type	Album Information	Brief Description	Track listing
1st EP	Autumn (秋天): Released:December 18, 2007; Label: Sony Music		Track listing: 1. Preface; 2. 秋天; 3. Happy Go; 4. 幸福曾经来过; 5. 分手的恋爱; 6. Happy Go (Remix)
2nd EP	Let the world listen (让世界听见): Released: April 13, 2015	In the summer and autumn of 2014, Allen Su participated in a reality show called "Let the World Hear," which focused on experiencing authentic indigenous music. During the recording period, Allen Su and other artists traveled to various places, including Dong villages in Guizhou, the Ganzi Tibetan Autonomous Prefecture in Sichuan, the Xilingol Grassland in Inner Mongolia, and the Nuohai Village in the Stone Forest of Yunnan. They experienced the infinite charm of Dong, Tibetan, Mongolian, and Yi ethnic music, admired the unique and beautiful scenery of each place, and bonded closely with local residents, sharing life experiences together. During this unforgettable musical journey, Allen Su truly immersed himself in the origins of these ethnic music styles, listening firsthand and experiencing them personally. He unleashed his creativity to the fullest, drawing inspiration from the experience. As a result, he completed five original compositions and officially released his EP "Let the World Hear" on April 13, 2015, which showcased a fusion of his own hip-hop blues style with indigenous music.	Track listing: 1. 让世界听到; 2. 侗听| Dong Style; 3. 神泉水 | DJ Chillen Remix; 4. 永恒之火; 5. 缘来

=== Others ===
DVD

- 秋天首唱会(DVD) LIVE全记录 (2007.12.29)

Compilations

- 13 (2007)

Song	Track Time	Lyricist	Composer	Producer	Arrangement
还不是因为爱	03'28"	Li Tai Bo 李太伯	Qu Peng Tao 曲澎涛	Wang Lu 王璐	Qu Peng Tao 曲澎涛
我最闪亮		Guo Jin Min 郭敬明	Wu Men Qi 吴梦奇		

- 红星闪闪 (2009)

Song	Track Time	Lyricist	Composer	Producer	Arrangement	Rap
南泥湾	03'16"	He Jin Zhi 贺敬之	Ma Ke 马可	Zhang Ya Dong 张亚东	Zhang Ya Dong 张亚东	Allen Su 苏醒

=== Singles ===
Song	Track Time	Lyricist	Composer	Producer	Arrangement	Description
谢谢你陪我一起过 (2008)	04'12"	Allen Su 苏醒	Allen Su 苏醒	Allen Su 苏醒	Allen Su 苏醒	Birthday Song
还不是因为爱Remix (2008)	03'52"	Li Tai Bo 李太伯	Qu Peng Tao 曲澎涛	Zhang Zhang 张张	Zhang Zhang 张张	Dance Party special remix
We Are Together 我们在一起 (2008)		Allen Su 苏醒	Allen Su 苏醒	Zhang Zhang 张张	Zhang Zhang 张张	汶川地震公益歌曲
好兄弟 (2008)			Khalil Fong 方大同			feat. Khalil Fong 方大同
I Wanna Run (2008)		Allen Su 苏醒	Zhang Zhang 张张			奥运歌曲
北京欢迎你 (2008)		Lin Xi 林夕	Xiao Ke 小柯			
My Style 我的Style (2008)	03'39"	Wen Yi Ren 翁乙仁	Chen Lei 陈磊		Chen Lei 陈磊	康师傅辣旋风2008广告歌曲
Love Rain 爱情雨 (2008)	04'14"	Man Jiang 满江	Man Jiang 满江			feat. Dai Rao 戴娆
It's the Magic (2009)	03'05"	Allen Su 苏醒	Allen Su 苏醒		Chen Lei 陈磊	湖南卫视金牌魔术师主题曲
China China (2009)		Allen Su 苏醒	Allen Su 苏醒		Lin Cong Yin 林从胤	建国六十周年献礼片

== Filmography ==
- China Idol Boys (乐火男孩) (2009)
- Money and Love (2016)

=== Drama ===
Stage Play: A Midsummer Night's Dream

Director	Liang Bo Long 梁伯龙
Main Actors/Actress	Yin Xiao Tian 印小天; Jiang Xiao Han 蒋小涵; Liu Ye 刘烨; Allen Su 苏醒
Allen's role	Francis Flute
Premiere Date	2007.11.02

== Awards and nominations ==
Date	Awards
2003	New Talent Singing Awards Sydney Contest, 3rd place 全球华人新秀歌唱大赛悉尼区第三
2005	伯乐巨星挑战赛悉尼区冠军
2006	New Talent Singing Awards Sydney Contest, Championship 全球华人新秀歌唱比赛悉尼区冠军; New Talent Singing Awards International Finals, 6th place 全球华人新秀歌唱比赛总决赛第六名
2007	Super Boy Contest Xi'an Regional Championship 快乐男声西安唱区冠军
2007	Super Boy Contest Finals, 2nd Place快乐男声全国总决赛亚军
2007.12.17	腾讯星光大典年度潜力歌手
2008.01.08	精品十五年时尚大典流行音乐活力新秀奖
2008.01.23	Esquire 时尚先生年度最具潜力男艺人奖
2008.01.26	雪碧原创音乐榜内地原创新人奖
2008.05	原创奥运单曲入选奥运征集歌曲60强，获得"推荐歌曲奖”
2008.12.23	<Best Newcomer Singer Award> from the first MengNiu Yoghurt Milk Drink Music Chart Annual Ceremony"
2009.01.11	<Most Popular Male Newcomer Award (Mainland)> from Nian Ci'an 2008 Beijing Pop Music Ceremony
2009.06.19	<King of Powerful Songwriters> and <Most Popular Advertising Song> from the 6th season "King of Powerful Songs" Global Chinese Music Selection -
2009.10.25	<Most Popular Singer Award> from "Enjoy China and Discover Beauty" Sina 2009 Internet Festival "
