= Reborn (band) =

- Genres: Death metal
- Years active: 2002–present

Reborn is a death metal band from Morocco. The band was founded in 2002, and after some initial local success became known more for political than musical reasons, when in April 2003 a Moroccan judge sentenced nine heavy metal musicians from Reborn and two other bands as well as five fans to jail time (between three months and one year) after they were found "in possession of skeletons, skulls, cobras, vipers and 'a collection of diabolical CDs.'" In April, a Casablanca court cut those sentences for three of the nine musicians to 45 days, and acquitted the eleven others.

According to Reda Zine, one of the founders of the Moroccan heavy metal scene, "We play heavy metal because our lives are heavy metal." The band performed at the 2003 Boulevard des Jeunes Musiciens music festival in Casablanca.

== Line-up ==
=== Founding members ===
- Nabil Andaloussi - drums
- Saad Bouidi - bass
- Amine Hamma - guitar
- Abdelsamad Bourhim - guitar
- Nabyl Guennouni - vocals
