= Super Boy (TV series) =

Chinese television music competition

- Logo
- Also known as: Happy Boys
- 快乐男声; Kuàilè Nánshēng
- Genre: Interactive reality game show
- Created by: Liao Ke
- Country of origin: China
- Original language: Mandarin
- No. of seasons: 3

Production
- Production locations: Changsha, Hunan (2); Chengdu, Sichuan (2); Guangzhou, Guangdong (2); Jinan, Shandong (2); Nanjing, Jiangsu (2); Xi'an, Shaanxi (2); Numbers indicate the season(s) in which a competition was held there.

Original release
- Network: Hunan Satellite Television
- Release: May 25, 2007 – 2013

Related
- Super Girl; Blossoming Flowers

Super Boy or Happy Boy (simplified Chinese: 快乐男声; traditional Chinese: 快樂男聲; pinyin: Kuàilè Nánshēng; literally "Happy Boys") was a Chinese singing contest for male contestants. It was organized by Hunan Satellite Television in 2007, as a spin-off of its popular Super Girl series. It's a talent show aiming to uncover tomorrow's new male stars.

== Outline ==
Partly inspired by the many spin-offs of the British show Pop Idol, the competition was open to any male contestant regardless of their origin, appearance, or how they sang. The restricted audition sessions drew contestants over the age of 18. Many applicants travelled long distances to participate in the competition, hoping to become the next pop star in China and elsewhere.

The competition began with the preliminary rounds, following the selection of contestants in the six regions. Preliminaries were held in each of the six locations where auditions were held. Television viewers could watch each preliminary and vote for their favorite singers. Voting was conducted by telephone and text messaging.

A weekly broadcast knockout competition follows the regional preliminaries in Changsha, Hunan province. Viewers call in to vote for their favourite singers, and the weakest two—as voted by the judges and the audience's weekly SMS— face off in a PK, short for Player Kill. The term is derived from kill-or-be-killed multiplayer online games. The singer with the fewest votes is then eliminated. Unlike Pop Idol, the last event is contested between the final three, rather than the final two contestants.

Unlike American Idol, judges for the competition were selected from different backgrounds in society. A few dozen "audience judges" and several professional judges were selected.

=== Democratic expression ===
One of the main factors contributing to the show's popularity was that viewers could participate in the judging process by sending text messages with their mobile phones to vote for their favorite contestants. According to Jim Yardley of the International Herald Tribune, this was considered one of the largest "democratic" voting exercises in mainland China.

=== Reaction ===
The contest selected many stars, such as Chen Chusheng, Jason Zhang, Chen Xiang, Vision Wei, Hua Chenyu and so on. It gives young boys who love music a way to achieve their dreams. But it also caused some criticism. Some people think it contributes to the atmosphere of daydreaming about becoming a star. Many young people change their attention from study to music and singing, without considering whether they have this gift. In sum, it once became a fashion.

== Season summary ==
| Season | Premiere Date | Champion | 1st Runner Up | 2nd Runner-up | Final's Contestants |
|---|---|---|---|---|---|
| 2007 快乐男声 | 25 May 2007 | Chen Chusheng (陈楚生) | Allen Su Xing (苏醒) | Vision Wei Chen (魏晨) | 1. Chen Chusheng (陈楚生); 2. Allen Su Xing (苏醒); 3. Vision Wei Chen (魏晨); 4. Jason Zhang Jie (张杰); 5. Jeffrey G Ji Jie (吉杰); 6. Ham Yu Haoming (俞灏明); 7. Ahu Wang Yuexin (王栎鑫); 8. Amguulan (阿穆隆); 9. Bird Zhang Yuan (张远); 10. Reno Wang Zhengliang (王铮亮); 11. Yao Zheng (姚政); 12. Guo Biao (郭彪); 13. L.T. Lu Hu (陆虎) |
| 2010 快乐男声 | 2 June 2010 | Well Li Wei (李炜) | Liu Xin (刘心) | Philip Lau / Wuyi (武艺) | 1. Well Li Wei (李炜); 2. Liu Xin (刘心); 3. Philip Lau / Wuyi (武艺); 4. Jaki Tan Jiexi (谭杰希); 5. Sean Chen Xiang (陈翔); 6. Li Hangliang (李行亮); 7. King Wang Ye (王野); 8. 8090 Zhang Jianbo (张建波); 9. Wu Junyu (吴俊余); 10. Umut (玉米提·帕日哈提); 11. Delay; 12. Zhao Fan (赵帆) |
| 2013 快乐男声 | 29 June 2013 | Hua Chenyu (华晨宇) | Oho Ou (欧豪) | Bai Jugang (白举纲) | 1. Hua Chenyu (华晨宇); 2. Oho Ou Hao (欧豪); 3. Pax Congo / Bai Jugang (白举纲); 4. Ning Huanyu (宁桓宇); 5. Yu Tian (于湉); 6. Fan Shiqi & Ju Laiti (范世琦、居来提); 7. Zhang Yangyang (张阳阳); 8. Rao Wei (饶威); 9. Zuo Li (左立); 10. Jia Shengqiang (贾盛强); 11. Yu Menglong (于朦胧) |

== 2007 season ==
The first season of Super Boy aired from May 25 to July 20, 2007. Although the competition winners were not promised recording contracts, the top three winners signed such deals.

=== Qualifications ===
| Region | 1st place | | 2nd place | |
| Region | Contestant | Votes | Contestant | Votes |
|---|---|---|---|---|
| Changsha | Lu Hu 陆虎 | 63510 | Zhou Luoming 周路明 | 27820 |
| Nanjing | Ji Jie 吉杰 | 80247 | Zhang Yuan 张远 | 73854 |
| Chengdu | Jason Zhang 张杰 | 157755 | Vision Wei 魏晨 | 36967 |
| Jinan | Yao Zheng 姚政 | 49115 | King | 19875 |
| Guangzhou | Wang Yuexin 王栎鑫 | 72083 | Yu Haoming 俞灏明 | 46385 |
| Xi'an | Su Xing 苏醒 | 65814 | Chen Chusheng 陈楚生 | 53713 |

=== Final contest ===
Final Contest
| No. | 18 → 13 | 13 → 11 | 11 → 9 | 9 → 7 | 7 → 6 | 6 → 5 | 5 → 4 | 4 → 3 | 3 → 2 | 2 → 1 |
|---|---|---|---|---|---|---|---|---|---|---|
| 1 | Su Xing 苏醒 | Zhang Jie 张杰 | Yu Haoming 俞灏明 | Su Xing 苏醒 | Chen Chusheng 陈楚生 | Chen Chusheng 陈楚生 | Wei Chen 魏晨 | Chen Chusheng 陈楚生 | Chen Chusheng 陈楚生 | Chen Chusheng 陈楚生 |
| 2 | Wang Yuexin 王栎鑫 | Wei Chen 魏晨 | Chen Chusheng 陈楚生 | Zhang Jie 张杰 | Su Xing 苏醒 | Zhang Jie 张杰 | Chen Chusheng 陈楚生 | Wei Chen 魏晨 | Su Xing 苏醒 | Su Xing 苏醒 |
| 3 | Guo Bia 郭彪 | Wang Zhenglian 王铮亮 | Wei Chen 魏晨 | Chen Chusheng 陈楚生 | Zhang Jie 张杰 | Su Xing 苏醒 | Su Xing 苏醒 | Su Xing 苏醒 | Wei Chen 魏晨 | |
| 4 | Yu Haoming 俞灏明 | Chen Chusheng 陈楚生 | Amguulan 阿穆隆 | Yu Haoming 俞灏明 | Wei Chen 魏晨 | Wei Chen 魏晨 | Zhang Jie 张杰 | Zhang Jie 张杰 | | |
| 5 | Lu Hu 陆虎 | Su Xing 苏醒 | Wang Yuexin 王栎鑫 | Wei Chen 魏晨 | Yu Haoming 俞灏明 | Ji Jie 吉杰 | Ji Jie 吉杰 | | | |
| 6 | Zhang Jie 张杰 | Yao Zheng 姚政 | Zhang Jie 张杰 | Wang Yuexin 王栎鑫 | Ji Jie 吉杰 | Yu Haoming 俞灏明 | | | | |
| 7 | Yao Zheng 姚政 | Ji Jie 吉杰 | Ji Jie 吉杰 | Ji Jie 吉杰 | Wang Yuexin 王栎鑫 | | | | | |
| 8 | Amguulan 阿穆隆 | Yu Haoming 俞灏明 | Zhang Yuan 张远 | Amguulan 阿穆隆 | | | | | | |
| 9 | Chen Chusheng 陈楚生 | Wang Yuexin 王栎鑫 | Su Xing 苏醒 | Zhang Yuan 张远 | | | | | | |
| 10 | Wei Chen 魏晨 | Zhang Yuan 张远 | Wang Zhenglian 王铮亮 | | | | | | | |
| 11 | Wang Zhenglian 王铮亮 | Amguulan 阿穆隆 | Yao Zhen 姚政 | | | | | | | |
| 12 | Zhang Yuan 张远 | Guo Biao 郭彪 | | | | | | | | |
| 13 | Ji Jie 吉杰 | Lu Hu 陆虎 | | | | | | | | |

Champion
Challenges succeed to switch rank
Eliminated

=== Final contestants ===
- Chen Chusheng (陈楚生) - Champion
- Su Xing (苏醒) - 2nd place
- Vision Wei (魏晨) - 3rd place
- Jason Zhang (张杰) - 4th place
- Ji Jie (吉杰) - 5th place
- Yu Haoming (俞灏明) - 6th place
- Wang Yuexin (王栎鑫) - 7th place
- Amguulan (阿穆隆) - 8th place
- Zhang Yuan (张远) - 9th place
- Wang Zhengliang (王铮亮) - 10th place
- Yao Zheng (姚政) - 11th place
- Guo Biao (郭彪) - 12 place
- Lu Hu (陆虎) - 13th place

== 2010 season ==
| Final Contest | | | | | | | | | | | Semi-final | |
| No. | 12+1 > 10+1A Jul 8 | 12+1 > 10+1B Jul 15 | 10+1 > 8+1 Jul 22 | 8+1 > 7+1 Jul 29 | 7+1 > 7 Aug 6 | 7 > 6 Aug 13 | 6 > 5 Aug 20 | 5 > 4 Aug 27 | 4 > 3 Sep 3 | 3 > 1 Sep 10 | No. | Rank 13-23 |
|---|---|---|---|---|---|---|---|---|---|---|---|---|
| 1 | Tan Jiexi 谭杰希 | Li Wei 李炜 | Li Hangliang 李行亮 | Li Wei 李炜 | Chen Xiang 陈翔 | Tan Jiexi 谭杰希 | Chen Xiang 陈翔 | Tan Jiexi 谭杰希 | Li Wei 李炜 | Li Wei 李炜 | 13 | Wang Keqi 王柯淇 |
| 2 | Wu Junyu 吴俊余 | Wang Ye 王野 | Liu Xin 刘心 | Tan Jiexi 谭杰希 | Li Hangliang 李行亮 | Chen Xiang 陈翔 | Li Wei 李炜 | Liu Xin 刘心 | Wuyi 武艺 | Liu Xin 刘心 | 13 | Zhao Lei 赵雷 |
| 3 | Liu Xin 刘心 | Chen Xiang 陈翔 | Tan Jiexi 谭杰希 | Li Hangliang 李行亮 | Li Wei 李炜 | Wuyi 武艺 | Wuyi 武艺 | Li Wei 李炜 | Liu Xin 刘心 | Wuyi 武艺 | 13 | Jiang Chao 姜潮 |
| 4 | Chen Xiang 陈翔 | Wuyi 武艺 | Chen Xiang 陈翔 | Chen Xiang 陈翔 | Wang Ye 王野 | Li Wei 李炜 | Tan Jiexi 谭杰希 | Wuyi 武艺 | Tan Jiexi 谭杰希 | | 13 | Jiang Xuchang 姜续昌 |
| 5 | Li Hangliang 李行亮 | Tan Jiexi 谭杰希 | Wuyi 武艺 | Wang Ye 王野 | Tan Jiexi 谭杰希 | Liu Xin 刘心 | Liu Xin 刘心 | Chen Xiang 陈翔 | | | 17 | Deng Rubi 邓入比 |
| 6 | Li Wei 李炜 | Wu Junyu 吴俊余 | Li Wei 李炜 | Liu Xin 刘心 | Liu Xin 刘心 | Li Hangliang 李行亮 | Li Hangliang 李行亮 | | | | 18 | Wang Jinlin 王矜霖 |
| 7 | Umut 玉米提·帕日哈提 | Umut 玉米提·帕日哈提 | Zhang Jianbo 张建波 | Wuyi 武艺 | Wuyi 武艺 | Wang Ye 王野 | | | | | 19 | Chen Xiao 陈骁 |
| 8 | Wuyi 武艺 | Li Hangliang 李行亮 | Wang Ye 王野 | Zhang Jianbo 张建波 | 8090 | | | | | | 20 | Hou Zhibin 侯志斌 |
| 9 | Wang Ye 王野Delay | Liu Xin 刘心 | Wu Junyu 吴俊余 | 8090 | | | | | | | 21 | Ma Limiao 冯立淼 |
| 10 | Zhao Fan 赵帆 | Zhang Jianbo 张建波 | Umut 玉米提·帕日哈提 | | | | | | | | 22 | Fan Bo 樊博 |
| 11 | Zhang Jianbo 张建波 | Delay | 8090 | | | | | | | | 23 | Wang Sihui 汪思辉 |
| 12 | Delay | Zhao Fan 赵帆 | | | | | | | | | | |
| 13 | 8090 | 8090 | | | | | | | | | | |

Champion
Weekly cover boy
Eliminated
Special contestants

=== Final contestants ===
- 06. Well Li Wei (李炜) - Fuzhou Area - 1st place - Champion
- 09. Liu Xin (刘心) - Changsha Area - 2nd place
- 02. Philip [Wuyi] (武艺) - Changsha Area - 3rd place
- 11. Jaki Tan Jiexi (谭杰希) - Guangzhou Area - 4th place
- 12. Chen Xiang (陈翔) - Chengdu Area - 5th place
- 04. Li Hangliang (李行亮) - Guangzhou Area - 6th place
- 03. King Wang Ye (王野) - Shenyang Area - 7th place
- 13. 8090 - Kuai Le Tian Tuan - 8th place
- 10. Zhang Jianbo (张建波) - Hefei Area - 8th place
- 07. Wu Junyu (吴俊余) - Chengdu Area - 9th place
- 05. Umut 玉米提·帕日哈提 - Changsha Area - 10th place
- 01. Delay - Chengdu Area - 11th place
- 08. Zhao Fan (赵帆) - Chengdu Area - 12 place

== See also ==
- Hunan Satellite Television
- Idol (franchise)
- The Voice of China
