= Bring Happiness Home =

- Release date: January 15, 2013 (China)
- Country: China
- Language: Mandarin
- Box office: $23.98 million

Bring Happiness Home (Chinese: 快乐到家) is a 2013 Chinese film. It stars the hosts of the Chinese variety show Happy Camp, who filmed it for their 15th anniversary.
