= Xie Na =

Chinese host, singer and actress

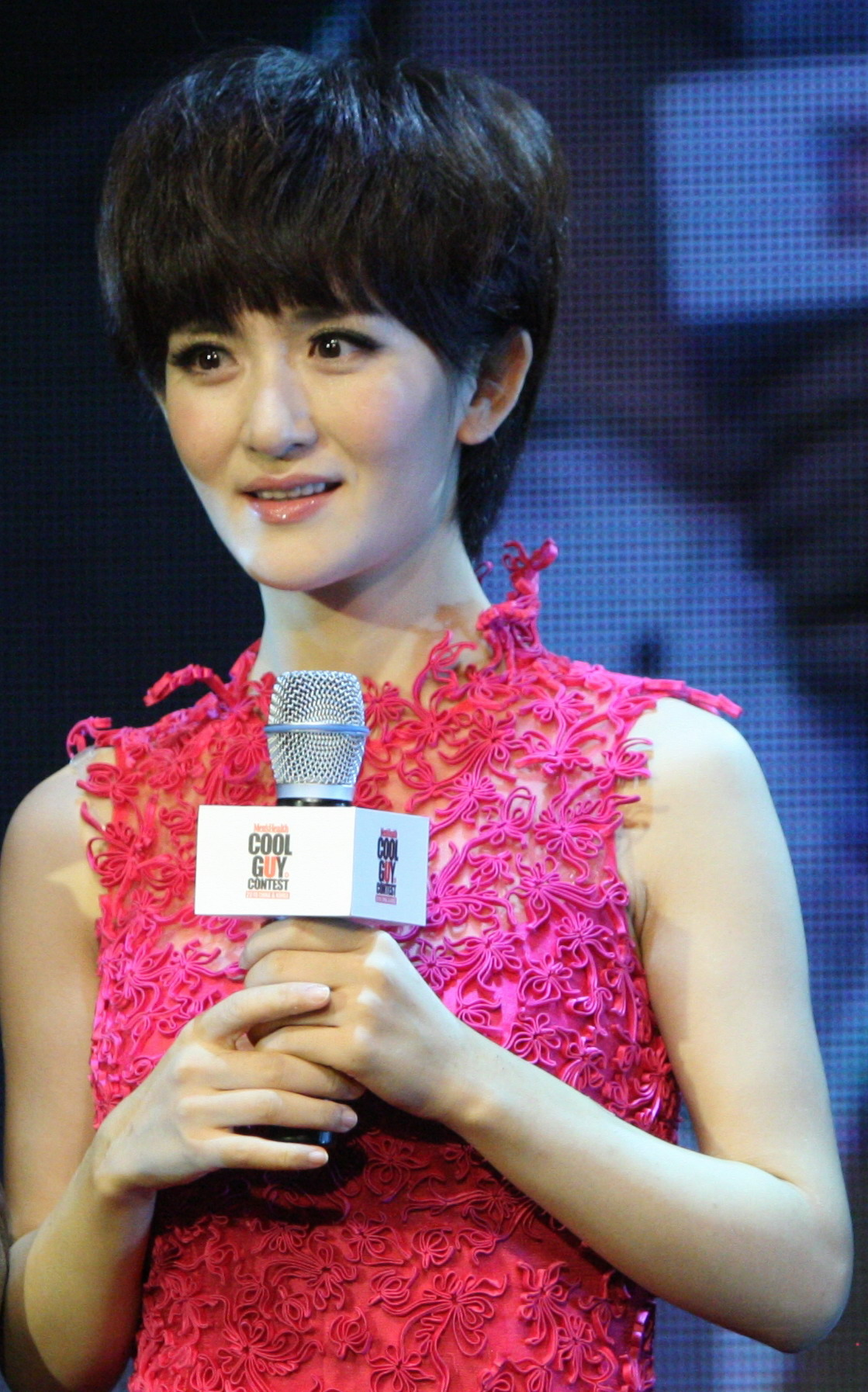
- Xie in 2014
- Born: May 6, 1981 (age 45); Deyang, Sichuan, China
- Education: Sichuan Normal University
- Occupations: Actress; singer; television presenter
- Years active: 1996–present
- Agent: Na Na Studio
- Spouse: Jason Zhang (m. 2011)
- Children: 3

Chinese name
- Traditional Chinese: 謝娜
- Simplified Chinese: 谢娜
Transcriptions
Standard Mandarin
- Hanyu Pinyin: Xiè Nà
- Musical career
- Also known as: Nana

Xie Na (simplified Chinese: 谢娜; traditional Chinese: 謝娜; pinyin: Xiè Nà; born May 6, 1981) is a Chinese host, singer and actress. She is best known for having co-hosted the Hunan Satellite TV program Happy Camp. She holds the Guinness World Records for the first person to accumulate 100 million followers on Weibo and most followers on Weibo.

== Career ==
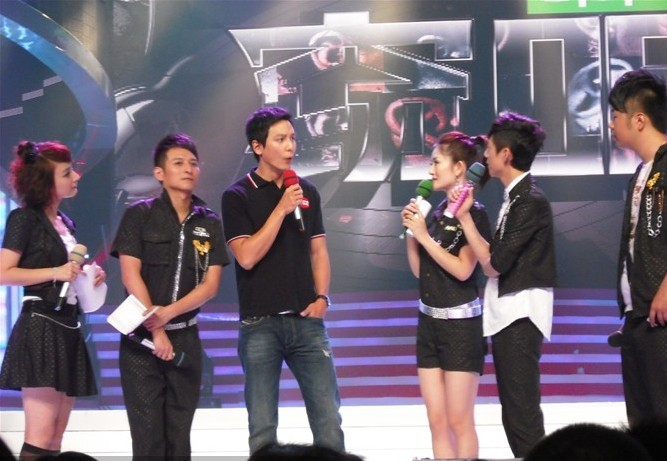
Happy Camp, 2009. Xie is third from the right.

Xie arrived in Beijing at age 18 to pursue a career in the entertainment industry. Before becoming a host, she was an actress, appearing in movies, TV series and stage productions. In 2006, she released her autobiography Na Shi Yi Zhen Feng (娜是一阵疯). In 2008, her second book Na Xie Nian Hua (娜写年华) was published. As a singer, Xie released her debut album "Bo Luo Bo Luo Mi" (菠萝菠萝蜜) in 2006, followed with two albums and an EP.

Xie founded her personal clothing line "HUANXING" on October 15, 2010, with a flagship store in Taobao Mall online. In July 2013, Xie attended Boston University's Center for English Language & Orientation Programs (CELOP) for a 6-week ESL program. In 2017, she co-founded her second clothing line "NAYOUNG" with the online arts education platform UNI-CLASS.

== Personal life ==
From 2000 to 2006, Xie dated actor Liu Ye.

Since 2008, Xie started dating singer Jason Zhang. On May 5, 2011, they registered for marriage in Chengdu. Their wedding ceremony was held on September 26, 2011, in Shangri-La City.

On February 1, 2018, she gave birth to twin daughters. In 2021, she gave birth to a third daughter.

== Filmography ==
=== Film ===
Year	Title	Chinese title	Role	Costar
1996	Young Liu Bocheng	青年刘伯承	The daughter of Liu Bocheng (刘伯承之女)	Sun Song (孙松), Wang Zhigang (王志刚)
2007	Two Stupid Eggs	大电影2.0之两个傻瓜的荒唐事	Mei Feng (美凤)	Guo Tao, Yao Chen
2007	Si Da Jin Chai	四大金钗	Daughter of Beggar (丐帮之女)	Jacky Wu, Annie Wu
2008	Na Na De Mei Gui Zhan Zheng	娜娜的玫瑰战争	Ding Na (丁娜)	Li Chengxuan (李承铉)
2009	Tracing Shadow	追影	Tang Wei (唐薇)	Pace Wu, Jaycee Chan, Francis Ng
2009	Mars Baby	火星宝贝之火星没事	Tina	Huang Lei, Wong Jing, Tong Dawei
2010	Love Tactics	爱情36计	A Touch Of Zen(侠女)	Daniel Chan, Liu Ye
2010	Beauty on Duty	美丽密令	Lu Wu Yi Shan(陆伍易珊)	Lu Yi, Sandra Ng
2010	Xi You Ji	西游记	Zhu Ba Jie(猪八戒)	He Jiong (何炅), Wang Zi (王子)
2010	Super Player	大玩家	the eighth fairy (八仙女)	Sun Xing (孙兴), Vincent Chiao, Huo Siyan
2010	The Legend of Silk Boy			
2010	Love in Disguise			
2012	Marry a Perfect Man	嫁个100分男人		
2013	Fantastic Adventure			
2013	Bring Happiness Home	快乐大本营之快乐到家		
2013	Princess and the Seven Kung Fu Masters	笑功震武林	Mai Danghong (麦当红)	Ronald Cheng, Sandra Ng
2013	Running All the Way	一路狂奔		
2013	My Boyfriends	我的男男男男朋友		
2014	Bringing Joy Home 2014			
2014	My Geeky Nerdy Buddies	大宅男		
2015	The Left Ear	左耳		
2016	Mr. Nian			

=== TV series ===
Year	Title	Chinese title	Role	Costar
1999	Young Hero Fang Shiyu	少年英雄方世玉	Xiao Li (小丽)	Dicky Cheung, Louis Fan
2000	Street of Happiness	幸福街	A Lanc(阿兰)	Liu Ye (刘烨), Zhang Wen
2000	Qi Wu Shi	棋武士	Han Xiang (含香)	Dicky Cheung, He Meidian (何美钿)
2003	A Pair of Embroidery Shoes	一双绣花鞋	Tan Xin (谭辛)	Sun Li, Qian Yongfu (钱勇夫)
2003	The Feeling of Summer	夏天的味道	Fang Ping (方平)	Liu Ye (刘烨), Tong Dawei, Yu Na (于娜)
2004	Wei Qing 24 Xiao Shi	危情24小时	Chi Jin (迟瑾)	Ren Quan (任泉), Liu Wei (刘威), Bao Lei (鲍蕾)
2005	Ji Su De Liang Man Qing Chun	极度的浪漫青春	Li Shuangshuang (李爽爽)	Zhang Liang (张亮), Li Jialin (李佳璘)
2005	Di Ren Jie Xi Yuan Lu	狄仁杰洗冤录	Lian Zi (莲子)	Bobby Au-yeung
2006	Xi Qi Yang Yang Zhu Ba Jie	喜气洋洋猪八戒	Tie Qin Princess (铁琴公主)	Gao Xin (高鑫), Huang Haibing (黄海冰)
2008	Zhuang Shi Chu Zheng	壮士出征	Yang Paifeng (杨排风)	Sun Xing (孙兴), Wang Gang
2008	The Legend of the Condor Heroes	射雕英雄传	Hua Zhen Princess (华筝公主)	Hu Ge, Ariel Lin
2009	Beauty Is Not Bad	美女不坏	Jian Ai (简爱)	Guo Pinchao (郭品超), Evonne Hsu

== Discography ==
Year	Type	Title	Chinese title
2006	Album	Bo Luo Bo Luo Mi	菠萝菠萝蜜
2008	Single	"NANA Zhu Yi"	NANA 主义
2010	Album	Yue Wan Yue Feng	乐玩乐疯
2011	Album	Blue Chocolate	蓝色巧克力
2018	Single	"Na Jiushi Kuaile"	娜就是快乐

In addition to releasing her own music, in 2010, Xie also participated in Happy Camp's album You'll See the Happiness (快乐你懂的), as one of the hosts for the show.

== Awards ==
Year	Event	Category	Result
1998	The Fifth Push, The New National Competition	Movie and TV Performance	Gold
2006	Dance Battle (Season 1, Chapter 2)		Gold
2007	Entertainment Awards Ceremony	Best Actress in a Stage Play	Won
2008	Sprite Music Awards	Best New Female Prospect	Won
2020	Forbes China Celebrity 100 list	—N/a	75th

== Books ==
- Na Shi Yi Zhen Feng (娜是一阵疯) (2006)
- Na Xie Nian Hua (娜些年华) (2008)
- Na Me Kuai Le (娜么快乐) (2012)
