= Li Xiang (host) =

Chinese actress, host and singer (born 1976)

- 李湘
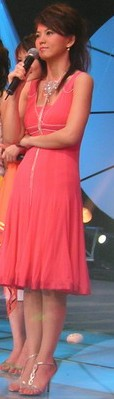
- Li Xiang on stage.
- Born: February 11, 1976 (age 50); Yueyang, Hunan, China
- Education: Communication University of China; Cheung Kong Graduate School of Business; Beijing University of International Business and Economics
- Occupations: Actress, host, singer
- Years active: 1997-present
- Television: Hunan Satellite TV
- Spouses: Li Houlin (m. 2005–2006) Wang Yuelun (m. 2009–2021)
- Children: 1

Li Xiang (Chinese: 李湘; pinyin: Lǐ Xiāng; born 11 February 1976) is a Chinese TV host and actress.

== Biography ==
Li was born in Yueyang, Hunan in February 1976. She is a graduate of Communication University of China, where she majored in acting and broadcasting. Li received her EMBA degree from Cheung Kong Graduate School of Business and Beijing University of International Business and Economics.

== Personal life ==
Li was twice married. Originally wed to entrepreneur Li Houlin (李厚霖), the couple divorced in 2006.

Li married in 2008 to Wang Yuelun (Chinese: 王岳伦), her second husband. They have a daughter, Angela Wang Shiling (王诗龄). Li and Wang divorced in July 2021.

== Works ==
=== TV Series ===
Year	Chinese title	English title	Role	Costar	Ref
1999	快嘴李翠莲		Li Cuilian	Chen Tingwei, Lu Jianmin	
1999	中华英豪		Yuan Jialing	Shao Bing, Cao Ying	
2001	佛跳墙	The story of The Mad Monk	Chen Jiayao	Wang Xuebing, Xia Yu	
2002	北京假日		Duanmu Jiajia	Zhang Shi, Geng Le	
2002	四大名捕会京师	The Four	Dugu Yiren	Che Renbiao, Wang Yan	
2003	情断上海滩		Zhao Meigui	Chen Long, Dai Jiaoqian	
2012	宫锁珠帘	Palace II	Meixian	Du Chun, Yang Mi, Feng Shaofeng	
2012	太平公主秘史	Secret History of Princess Taiping	Wu Zetian	Alyssa Chia, Zheng Shuang, Liu Yuxin	

=== Film ===
Year	Chinese title	English title	Role	Costar	Ref
2000	衣锦还乡		Xiangxiang	Cheng Qian, Hou Yaohua	
2001	防守反击		Ren Xiaoyu	Eric Tsang, Hong Jiantao	
2003	阿龙的故事	The story of A'long	Liang Peiyi	Patrick Tam, Tian Niu	
2003	警察有约		guest	Xia Yu	
2008	十全九美	Almost Perfect	guest	Liu Hua	
2009	寻找成龙	Looking for Jackie	guest	Jackie Chan, Yuen Wah, Yuen Qiu	
2011	建党伟业	The Founding of a Party	a teacher	Leehom Wang, Fan Bingbing, Tang Wei	
2019	别告诉她	The Farewell	Auntie Ling	Awkwafina, Zhao Shuzhen	

=== Studio album ===
#	Name	Released	Label	Ref
1st	Li Xiang (Chinese: 李湘)	2001		
2nd	Yangguang Xiang (Chinese: 阳光湘)	2005		

=== Books ===
- Happy Wind (Chinese: 快乐如风—李湘写真集) (1999)
- The Story of the Sweet Honey (Chinese: 甜蜜蜜的孕事) (2010)
