= Singer season 3 =

Singer
- Season 3
- Hosted by: Leo Ku (Episode 1–7); Sun Nan (Episodes 8–11, Breakout); Wang Han (final round); Shen Mengchen (2015 Biennial Concert)
- Judges: 500 public audiences
- Winner: Han Hong
- Runner-up: Li Jian
- Finals venue: Hunan Broadcasting System

Release
- Original network: Hunan Television
- Original release: January 2 – April 3, 2015

Season chronology
- ← Previous; Season 2 Next → Season 4

I Am a Singer (season 3), is a Chinese TV series produced by Hunan TV. The show was launched in 2015, and aired every Friday at 10:00 pm. The program was produced by Hong Tao, and the show's music director was Kubert Leung. In 2015, Liby Enterprise Group paid 3 million to acquire exclusive naming rights for the program, compared to Season 2 (0.65 million).

There were minor changes to the rules of competition for this season, including the debut of the "Challenge Round", where singers had to finish in a certain position to be allowed to remain in the competition. This season saw an increase of the number of contestants, at 13, up from 12 from the previous season.

The season premiered on January 2, 2015. and ended on April 3, 2015. Han Hong was named the winner of the competition on the finals aired on March 27, 2015, and Han was the first female winner of the series. Li Jian and The One came in as first and second runners-up.

== Competition rules ==
The Qualifying and Knockout rounds were retained as part of the show's format. As with previous seasons, the combined vote count from both the Qualifying and Knockout rounds determined which singer was eliminated on the night. Introduced in the last season, was contestants hosting roles; this season featured Leo Ku and Sun Nan as the hosts, which had a comedian manager selected by the show's producers.

=== Challenge round ===
As the show is being revamped into a new "2+1" format, the +1 was announced as "Challenge Round", which follows after each Knockout. A new Challenger enter the competition taking place for the previously eliminated singer with a twist where the singer requiring to beat a majority of singers (i.e. ranking in top four or better) or face elimination. If the Challenger was successful, the seven incumbent singers were placed in risk of elimination, while votes cast from the Knockout rounds do not carry forward to the Challenge round. Like eliminated singers, unsuccessful challengers (unless elected to withdraw) were also entitled to return performance and taking part in the Breakouts.

To promote the new Challenge round, singers were open for registration via social media. The first singer, Golden Melody Award Newcomer Award winner Li Ronghao took advantage of the registration which helped other singers to promote the program and register themselves for the competition. The show's official social media website, Sina Weibo revealed that over 60 singers had registered for the show at the close of the registration, but also told only one singer would actually get to participate in the show.

=== Singer voting ===
Singers can cast their votes for the top three performances before the results were announced. Singer voting did not affect the outcome of the competition and did not count toward the audience's vote count. The singer who finished first in the Singer voting won prizes from a sponsor, or entitled to advantage in the next round.

== Contestants ==
The following singers participated in the third season are listed in alphabetical order (singers without a placement for the final is listed as finalist, and singers withdrew were listed as withdrawn):

Key:

– Winner
– Runner-up
– Third place
– Other finalist
– Withdrew
– Withdrew (Initially eligible for Breakout round but did not participate)

Contestant	Country/Region	Manager	Status	Week Entered	Week Exited	Result
Jess Lee	Malaysia	Rolling Wang	Challenger	Week 9 (Challenge round 3)	Week 9 (Challenge round 3); Week 12 (Breakout round)	Eliminated
A-Lin	Taiwan	Shen Ling	Initial singer	Week 1 (qualifying round 1)	Week 13 (finals)	Finalist (4th-6th place)
Kit Chan	Singapore	Tian Yuan	Initial singer	Week 1 (qualifying round 1)	Week 2 (knockout round 1); Week 12 (Breakout round)	Eliminated
Han Hong	China	Jackie Tam	Initial singer	Week 1 (qualifying round 1)	Week 13 (finals)	Winner
Hsiao Huang-chi	Taiwan	Yan Wei	Substitute singer	Week 10 (qualifying round 4)	Week 12 (Breakout round)	Eliminated
Tiger Hu	China	Wu Yang	Initial singer	Week 1 (qualifying round 1); Week 12 (Breakout round)	Week 5 (knockout round 2); Week 13 (finals)	Finalist (4th-6th place)
Leo Ku	Hong Kong	Wang Qiao	Initial singer	Week 1 (qualifying round 1)	Week 6 (Challenge round 2)	Eliminated
Li Ronghao	China	Belinda Liang	Challenger	Week 3 (Challenge round 1)	Week 3 (Challenge round 1); Week 12 (Breakout round)	Eliminated
Li Jian	China	Shen Mengchen	Substitute singer	Week 4 (qualifying round 2)	Week 13 (finals)	Runner-up
Sun Nan	China	Li Rui	Initial singer	Week 1 (qualifying round 1)	Week 13 (finals)	7th place (withdrew)
Sitar Tan	China	Wayne Zhang	Challenger	Week 6 (Challenge round 2)	Week 13 (finals)	Finalist (4th-6th place)
The One	South Korea	Tanas	Substitute singer	Week 7 (qualifying round 3)	Week 13 (finals)	Third place
Jane Zhang	China	Li Weijia	Initial singer	Week 1 (qualifying round 1)	Week 8 (knockout round 3)	Withdrew

=== Future appearances ===
Han Hong, Li Jian, The One, Sitar Tan, Tiger Hu and A-Lin all returned as guest performers on the biennial concert on the following season. Li returned again as a contestant on the fifth season. Han, Kit Chan, A-Lin and Sitar Tan appeared as guest performers on the fifth, sixth and seventh seasons, respectively.

== Results ==
First	Safe	Bottom	Eliminated	Return Performance	Challenger	Challenge Success
Challenge Failure	Breakout Success	Breakout Failure	Winner	Runner-up	Withdrew	

	Singer	Broadcast date (2015)													
	Singer	Jan 2	Jan 9	Jan 16	Jan 23	Jan 30	Feb 6	Feb 13	Feb 20	Feb 27	Mar 6	Mar 13	Mar 20	Mar 27	
	Singer	1st round			2nd round			3rd round			4th round		Breakout	Final Round	
	Singer	Qualifying	Knockout	Challenge	Qualifying	Knockout	Challenge	Qualifying	Knockout	Challenge	Qualifying	Knockout	Breakout	1st round	2nd round
1	Han Hong	1	2	2	1	6	6	2	3	2	6	4	—	1	1
2	Li Jian	—	—	—	3	4	3	3	1	6	2	5	1	5	2
3	The One	—	—	—	—	—	—	1	6	2	1	3	4	3	3
=4	A-Lin	3	6	4	2	2	4	4	2	4	7	2	—	6	—
=4	Sitar Tan	—	—	—	—	—	1	5	5	1	4	6	2	2	—
=4	Tiger Hu	5	5	3	4	7	—	—	—	—	—	—	3	4	—
7	Sun Nan	4	4	5	5	5	2	6	4	7	5	1	—	4	—
=8	Kit Chan	7	7	—	—	—	—	—	—	—	—	—	5	—	—
=8	Leo Ku	6	3	1	6	3	7	—	—	—	—	—	6	—	—
=8	Hsiao Huang Chi	—	—	—	—	—	—	—	—	—	3	7	7	—	—
=8	Jess Lee	—	—	—	—	—	—	—	—	5	—	—	8	—	—
=8	Li Ronghao	—	—	6	—	—	—	—	—	—	—	—	9	—	—
=8	Jane Zhang	2	1	7	7	1	5	7	7	—	—	—	—	—	—

== Details of competitions ==
=== 1st round ===
==== Qualifying ====
- Taping Date: December 20, 2014
- Airdate: January 2, 2015,

The order of performance for this episode was determined by Han Hong, which the 500-member audience voted for the singer who gave the best first impression.

I Am a Singer Season 3 1st Qualifying Round January 2, 2015, Host: Leo Ku
Order of Performance	Singer	Comedian Manager	Song Title	Original Singer	Lyrics	Composer	Arranger	Ranking	Singer Voting
1	Leo Ku	Wang Qiao	"爱與誠" (Cantonese)	Leo Ku	Lin Xi	Cao Xuefen	Dennie Wong	6	—
2	Sun Nan	Li Rui	"是否爱过我"	Sun Nan	Sun Nan; Na Ying	San Bao	Kubert Leung	4	—
3	A-Lin	Shen Ling	"給我一個理由忘記"	A-Lin	Wu Yukang	Roger Yo		3	—
4	Tiger Hu	Wu Yang	"山丘"	Jonathan Lee			Gu Lu; Tiger Hu	5	—
5	Kit Chan	Tain Yuan	"心动"	Shino Lin	Lin Xi	Kay Huang	Chiu Tsang Hei; Fong Wenpu	7	3
6	Jane Zhang	Li Weijia	"我用所有報答愛"	Jane Zhang	Fan Xueyi	Tan Dun	Kubert Leung	2	
7	Han Hong	Jackie Tam	"天亮了"	Han Hong			Rama Liu	1	

==== Knockout ====
- Taping Date: December 28, 2014
- Airdate: January 9, 2015

I Am a Singer Season 3 1st Knockout Round January 9, 2015, Host: Leo Ku
Order of Performance	Singer	Comedian Manager	Song Title	Original Singer	Lyrics	Composer	Arranger	Ranking	Singer Voting
1	Han Hong	Jackie Tam	"梨花又開放"	Jonathan Lee	Ding Xiaoqi	因幡晃	Tan Yizhe	2	
2	Kit Chan	Tain Yuan	"心如刀割"	Jacky Cheung	Lim Feihui		Fong Wenpu	7	—
3	Sun Nan	Li Rui	"夢開始的地方"	Angus Tung	Angus Tung 蘇來	Tong An Ge	Guo Liang	4	2 (Tie)
3	Sun Nan	Li Rui	"草原上升起不落的太阳"	吳雁澤	美麗其格		Guo Liang	4	2 (Tie)
4	Jane Zhang	Li Weijia	"餓狼傳說" (Cantonese)	Jacky Cheung	Poon Wai Yuen	John Laudon	張健偉	1	
5	Tiger Hu	Wu Yang	"一言難盡"	Phil Chang	十一郎	Chang Yu	谷慄; Tiger Hu	5	—
6	Leo Ku	Wang Qiao	"父亲"	Chopstick Brothers	Terry Wang		Pyo Keun Soo	3	—
7	A-Lin	Shen Ling	"輸了你贏了世界又如何"	Ukulele	詹兆源		蔡如嶽	6	—

==== Overall ranking ====
I Am a Singer Season 3 1st round overall ranking
Ranking	Singer	Match 1 Percentages of Votes (Ranking)	Match 2 Percentages of Votes (Ranking)	Total Percentages of Votes
1	Jane Zhang	18.67% (2)	25.33% (1)	21.99%
2	Han Hong	22.42% (1)	19.42% (2)	20.92%
3	Sun Nan	14.79% (4) ^{[a]}	14.71% (4) ^{[b]}	14.75%
4	Tiger Hu	13.79% (5)	12.70% (5)	13.25%
5	Leo Ku	9.17% (6)	14.91% (3)	12.04%
6	A-Lin	14.85% (3)	8.46% (6)	11.66%
7	Kit Chan	6.29% (7)	4.43% (7)	5.36%

A. Had a one vote difference between 3rd place singer.
B. Had a three vote difference between 3rd place singer.

==== Challenge ====
- Taping Date: January 8, 2015
- Airdate: January 16, 2015,

Singer Li Ronghao was the first-ever challenger of I Am a Singer. Jane Zhang would have been eliminated for finishing last, however, Li was unsuccessful in his challenge (finished 6th) and was eliminated instead.

I Am a Singer Season 3 1st Challenge Round January 16, 2015, Host: Leo Ku
Order of Performance	Singer	Comedian Manager	Song Title	Original Singer	Lyrics	Composer	Arranger	Ranking	Singer Voting
1	Jane Zhang	Li Weijia	"生如夏花"	Pu Shu			萬家銘	7	—
2	Tiger Hu	Wu Yang	"耶利亞女郎"	Angus Tung; Liu Wen-cheng; Jacqueline Teo	Angus Tung		谷慄; Tiger Hu	3	2 (Tie)
3	A-Lin	Shen Ling	"找自己"	David Tao			Mac Chew	4	2 (Tie)
4	Han Hong	Jackie Tam	"往事隨風"	Chyi Chin	許常德	塗惠源	Rama Liu	2	
5	Leo Ku	Wang Qiao	"情人" (Cantonese)	Beyond	Gene Lau	Wong Ka Kui	Kubert Leung	1	—
6	Sun Nan	Li Rui	"至少還有你"	Sandy Lam; Yu Xiang	Lin Xi	Davy Chan	張江 東子	5	1
7	Li Ronghao	Eliza Liang	"模特"	Li Ronghao	Chow Yiu Fai	Li Ronghao		6	—
8	Kit Chan	Tain Yuan	"Nothing Compares To You" (English)	Sinéad O'Connor	Prince		Fong Wenpu	Return Performance	

=== 2nd round ===
==== Qualifying ====
- Taping Date: January 15, 2015
- Airdate: January 23, 2015

Li Jian was the first substitute singer of the season. For this episode, the performance order was determined by Leo Ku, who finished first last week. Jian was originally going to perform "傳奇" this week, but later scrapped during rehearsals, citing that the song was 'meaningless' to the competition.

I Am a Singer Season 3 2nd Qualifying Round January 23, 2015, Host: Leo Ku
Order of Performance	Singer	Comedian Manager	Song Title	Original Singer	Lyrics	Composer	Arranger	Ranking	Singer Voting
1	Sun Nan	Li Rui	"這一次我絕不放手"	Chyi Chin	許常德	劉天健	Nick Pyo	5	2 (Tie)
2	Jane Zhang	Li Weijia	"離歌"	Shin	Daryl Yao	Yoon Il Sang	康友韋	7	—
3	A-Lin	Shen Ling	"愛上你等於愛上寂寞"	Na Ying	徐光義		昊子	2	
4	Tiger Hu	Wu Yang	"Don't Break My Heart"	Black Panther	Dou Wei		谷慄; Tiger Hu	4	1 (Tie)
5	Leo Ku	Wang Qiao	"突然好想你" (Mandarin)	Mayday	Ashin		劉卓 閆天午	6	—
6	Han Hong	Jackie Tam	"莫尼山" (Mongolian/Mandarin)	額爾古納樂隊	呂燕衛	額爾古納樂隊	秦萬民	1	
7	Li Jian	Shen Mengchen	"貝加爾湖畔"	Li Jian			劉卓	3	—
8	Li Ronghao	Eliza Liang	"笑忘書"	Faye Wong	Lin Xi	C.Y.Kong	Li Ronghao; Edward	Return Performance	

==== Knockout ====
- Taping Date: January 22, 2015
- Airdate: January 30, 2015

I Am a Singer Season 3 2nd Knockout Round January 23, 2015, Host: Leo Ku
Order of Performance	Singer	Comedian Manager	Song Title	Original Singer	Lyrics	Composer	Arranger	Ranking	Singer Voting
1	Tiger Hu	Wu Yang	"味道"	Winnie Hsin	Yao chien	Huang Kuo-lun	谷慄; Tiger Hu	7 ^{[a]}	—
2	Li Jian	Shen Mengchen	"在水一方"	Jiang Lei	Chiung Yao	林家慶	劉卓 閆天午	4 ^{[b]}	2
3	Leo Ku	Wang Qiao	"Monica" (Cantonese)	Cheung Kwok Wing	Peter Lai	NOBODY	Nick Pyo	3 ^{[c]}	—
4	Han Hong	Jackie Tam	"海闊天空"	Shin	Daryl Yao	Hun Lim; Jun Young Choi	Han Hong 許明	6 ^{[d]}	—
5	Sun Nan	Li Rui	"一塊紅布"	Cui Jian			撈仔}	5	3
5	Sun Nan	Li Rui	"南泥灣" (Mandarin)	郭蘭英	He Jingzhi	Ma Ke	撈仔}	5	3
6	Jane Zhang	Li Weijia	"Bang Bang" (English)	Jessie J Ariana Grande; Nicki Minaj	Max Martin; Savan Kotecha; Rickard Göransson; Onika Maraj		Craig Tsai	1 ^{[e]}	
7	A-Lin	Shen Ling	"我等到花兒也謝了"	Jacky Cheung	吳慶康	Lee Wei Shiong; Keith Chan Siu-kei	遊政豪	2 ^{[f]}	—

A. Voted 7th in the 20s age group
B. Voted 3rd in the 40s age group
C. Voted 1st in the 10+ age group
D. Voted 5th in the 20s age group
E. Voted 1st in the 30s age group
F. Voted 1st in the 40s age group

==== Overall ranking ====
I Am a Singer Season 3 2nd round overall ranking
Ranking	Singer	Match 1 Percentages of Votes (Ranking)	Match 2 Percentages of Votes (Ranking)	Total Percentages of Votes
1	A-Lin	19.28% (2)	18.98% (2) ^{[b]}	19.13%
2	Li Jian	19.22% (3) ^{[a]}	14.01% (4)	16.61%
3	Han Hong	20.05% (1)	11.20% (6)	15.62%
4	Jane Zhang	7.12% (7)	19.18% (1)	13.15%
5	Leo Ku	7.89% (6)	16.70% (3)	12.29%
6	Sun Nan	11.11% (5)	12.27% (5)	11.69%
7	Tiger Hu	15.30% (4)	7.64% (7)	11.47%

A. Has one vote difference between 2nd place singer.
B. Has three vote difference between 3rd place singer.

==== Challenge ====
- Taping Date: January 29, 2015
- Airdate: February 6, 2015

Singer Sitar Tan was the second challenger of the season.

I Am a Singer Season 3 2nd Challenge Round February 6, 2015, Host: Leo Ku
Order of Performance	Singer	Comedian Manager	Song Title	Original Singer	Lyrics	Composer	Arranger	Ranking	Singer Voting
1	Han Hong	Jackie Tam	"你是這樣的人"	Liu Huan	Song Xiaoming	San Bao	A Kun	6	1
2	Leo Ku	Wang Qiao	"匆匆那年"	Faye Wong	Lin Xi	Kubert Leung	Johnny Yim ^{[a]}	7	—
3	Li Jian	Shen Mengchen	"袖手旁觀"	Chyi Chin	Yao chien	Huang Kuo Lun	Kubert Leung; Da Ridan	3	—
4	Sun Nan	Li Rui	"突然想愛你"	Valen Hsu			Baby Chung	2	
5	Jane Zhang	Li Weijia	"忘情森巴舞"	Grasshopper	Calvin Choy	V.Barber	Liao Weijie	5	—
6	A-Lin	Shen Ling	"Halo" (English)	Beyoncé	Beyoncé Knowles; Ryan Tedder; Kidd Bogart		Hao Zi	4	—
7	Sitar Tan	Wayne Zhang	"燈塔"	Huang Qishan	Liang Mang	Traditional Hymn folk song	Nick Pyo	1	2 (Tie)
8	Tiger Hu	Wu Yang	"眼色"	Yoga Lin	Li Quan		Gu Li; Hu Yanbi	Return Performance	

=== 3rd round ===
==== Qualifying ====
- Taping Date: February 5, 2015
- Airdate: February 13, 2015

The One was the second substitute singer of the season.

I Am a Singer Season 3 3rd Qualifying Round February 13, 2015, Host: Leo Ku
Order of Performance	Singer	Comedian Manager	Song Title	Original Singer	Lyrics	Composer	Arranger	Ranking	Singer Voting
1	Jane Zhang	Li Weijia	"是否"	Su Rui	Lo Ta Yu		Wan Jiaming	7	—
2	Sun Nan	Li Rui	"花瓣雨"	Angus Tung	Wang Zhongyan	Angus Tung	Lao Zai	6	1
3	Li Jian	Shen Mengchen	"今天是你的生日，媽媽"	Zhong Lifeng			Liu Zhuo	3	—
4	Sitar Tan	Wayne Zhang	"開門見山"	A-mei	Lin Xi	Zhang Jianwei	Nick Pyo	5	3
5	Han Hong	Jackie Tam	"回到拉薩"	Zheng Jun			Jin Wulin; Xu Ming	2	
6	A-Lin	Shen Ling	"她說"	JJ Lin	Stefanie Sun; Yee Kar Yeung	JJ Lin	Wen Yizhe	4	—
7	The One	Tanas	"那個男人"	Aska Yang (Mandarin)		Hae Seong Jeon	Shim Hyung; Kim Heewon	1	—
7	The One	Tanas	"那個男人"	Hyun Bin (Korean)	Tae Yeon Won	Hae Seong Jeon	Shim Hyung; Kim Heewon	1	—
8	Leo Ku	Wang Qiao	"明星" (Cantonese)	Mary Cheung	James Wong		Hu Hao; Tiger Hu	Return Performance	

==== Knockout ====
- Taping Date: February 12, 2015
- Airdate: February 20, 2015

I Am a Singer Season 3 3rd Knockout Round February 20, 2015, Host: Sun Nan
Order of Performance	Singer	Comedian Manager	Song Title	Original Singer	Lyrics	Composer	Arranger	Ranking	Singer Voting
1	Han Hong	Jackie Tam	"橄欖樹"	Chyi Yu; Four Golden Princess; Stefanie Sun; Fei Yu-ching; Timi Zhuo; Fei Xiang; Zhuang Xuezhong	Sanmao	Li Tai-hsiang	Tiger Hu 谷慄	3 ^{[a]}	1 (Tie)
2	The One	Tanas	"You Raise Me Up" (English)	Josh Groban; Secret Garden; Westlife	Brendan Graham	Rolf Løvland	Shin Hyung; Kim Heewon	6	—
3	Sun Nan	Li Rui	"執迷不悔"	Faye Wong	王靖雯	John	Baby Chung 張江	4	1 (Tie)
4	Jane Zhang	Li Weijia	"冬天裡的一把火"	Frankie Kao	莊奴	Solan Sister	Nick Pyo	7	—
5	Sitar Tan	Wayne Zhang	"也許明天"	A-mei	施立	Martin Tang	Nick Pyo	5	2
6	A-Lin	Shen Ling	"忘記擁抱"	Will Pan	葛大為 張簡君偉	張簡君偉	遊政豪	2 ^{[b]}	—
7	Li Jian	Shen Mengchen	"当你老了"	Zhao Zhao	Zhao Zhao 葉芝; Li Jian	Zhao Zhao	劉卓	1 ^{[c]}	—

A. Voted 1st in the 50s age group
B. Voted 1st in the 10+ and 20s age group
C. Voted 2nd in the 20s age group, and 1st in the 30s and 40s age group

==== Overall ranking ====
I Am a Singer Season 3 3rd round overall ranking
Ranking	Singer	Match 1 Percentages of Votes (Ranking)	Match 2 Percentages of Votes (Ranking)	Total Percentages of Votes
1	Li Jian	16.09% (3)	22.20% (1)	19.14%
2	Han Hong	18.18% (2)	14.80% (3)	16.49%
3	The One	21.08% (1)	11.53% (6)	16.30%
4	A-Lin	12.66% (4)	17.53% (2)	15.09%
5	Sitar Tan	12.29% (5)	12.93% (5)	12.61%
6	Sun Nan	11.47% (6)	13.33% (4)	12.40%
7	Jane Zhang	8.19% (7)	7.66% (7)	7.92%

==== Challenge (Ultimate Challenge Round) ====
- Taping Date: February 13, 2015
- Airdate: February 27, 2015

Jess Lee was the third and final challenger of the season.

During the results, this round came to have produced the narrowest margin of 26 votes between the top five performers in I Am a Singer history, as Tan, Han, The One, A-Lin and Lee, received 241, 232, 232, 216 and 215 votes, respectively (percentages were 16.14%, 15.51%, 15.51%, 14.43% and 14.36%, respectively); by a one-vote difference, Lee was eliminated for failing the challenge (and Sun Nan, who would have been eliminated for finishing last, was safe).

I Am a Singer Season 3 3rd Challenge Round (Ultimate Challenge Round) February 27, 2015, Host: Sun Nan
Order of Performance	Singer	Comedian Manager	Song Title	Original Singer	Lyrics	Composer	Arranger	Ranking	Singer Voting
1	Li Jian	Shen Mengchen	"塵緣"	Roman Tam	陳玉貞	Tsui Yat Kan	王之一	6	—
2	Sun Nan	Li Rui	"永遠不回頭"	Chang Yu Sheng; Dave Wang; Samuel Tai; Jack Yao	陳樂融	陳志遠	鐮田俊哉; CHOKKAKU	7	—
3	Sitar Tan	Wayne Zhang	"康定情歌與溜溜調"	喻宜萱	李依若		Rama Liu	1	—
4	Han Hong	Jackie Tam	"故鄉的雲"	John Huang	小軒	譚健常	金武林 許明	2 (Tie)	1 (Tie)
5	The One	Tanas	"My Destiny"	Jeff Chang (Mandarin)	何啟弘	Jin Myeong Won	Kim Hyung Kyn; Jeon Da Woon	2 (Tie)	—
5	The One	Tanas	"My Destiny"	Lyn (Korean) Lyn	Jun Chang Yeob	Jin Myeong Won	Kim Hyung Kyn; Jeon Da Woon	2 (Tie)	—
6	A-Lin	Shen Ling	"一想到你呀"	A-mei	Chang Yu-sheng		陳飛午	4	1 (Tie)
6	A-Lin	Shen Ling	"老人飲酒歌"	Difang Duana	Amis ballad		陳飛午	4	1 (Tie)
7	Jess Lee	Rolling Wang	"煎熬"	Jess Lee	Jennifer 傅從浬 吳輝福	饒善強	Kubert Leung	5	2
8	Jane Zhang	Li Weijia	"All of Me" (English)	John Legend	John Legend; Toby Gad		梁思樺	Return Performance	

=== 4th round ===
==== Qualifying (Ultimate Qualifying Round) ====
- Taping Date: February 20, 2015
- Airdate: March 6, 2015

Hsiao Huang Chi was the third and final substitute singer of the season. During this episode, Sun decided to rewrite the lyrics on his performance, "全部的愛", to dedicate his daughter.

I Am a Singer Season 3 4th Qualifying Round (Ultimate Qualifying Round) March 6, 2015, Host: Sun Nan
Order of Performance	Singer	Comedian Manager	Song Title	Original Singer	Lyrics	Composer	Arranger	Ranking	Singer Voting
1	Han Hong	Jackie Tam	"我很醜可是我很溫柔"	Chao Chuan	李格弟	Kay Huang	Rama Liu	6	2 (Tie)
2	Sitar Tan	Wayne Zhang	"往日時光"	Pang Long	克明	烏蘭托嘎	劉迦寧	4	2 (Tie)
3	Sun Nan	Li Rui	"全部的愛"	Mika Nakashima	Satomi	松本良喜	Nick Pyo	5	2 (Tie)
4	Li Jian	Shen Mengchen	"月光"	Yu Quan	刑天溯		趙兆	2	—
5	The One	Tanas	"聽海"	A-mei	Eric Lin	塗惠源	Kim Hyung Kyu; Son Young jin	1	2 (Tie)
6	A-Lin	Shen Ling	"忘不了"	Angus Tung			陳飛午	7	—
7	Hsiao Huang-Chi	Yan Wei	"你是我的眼"	Hsiao Huang Chi			Yao Hung	3	1
8	Jess Lee	Rolling Wang	"勇敢" (Mandarin)	A-mei	Chin Kah Mun 夏木	SHIN IN SOO	遊政豪	Return Performance	

==== Knockout (Ultimate Knockout Round) ====
- Taping Date: February 27, 2015
- Airdate: March 13, 2015,

During this episode, Jian's manager was temporarily replaced by Eliza Liang as Shen Mengchen was absent during tapings to host the 2015 Hunan Television special The Lantern Festival Show.

I Am a Singer Season 3 4th Knockout Round (Ultimate Knockout Round) March 13, 2015, Host: Sun Nan
Order of Performance	Singer	Comedian Manager	Song Title	Original Singer	Lyrics	Composer	Arranger	Ranking	Singer Voting
1	The One	Tanas	"暗香"	Sha Baoliang	陳濤	三寶	Kim Hyung Kyu; Son Young jin	3	—
2	Li Jian	Eliza Liang	"陀螺"	Wan Xiaoli			劉卓	5	—
3	Han Hong	Jackie Tam	"红蔷薇"	正午陽光	王寶		金武林	4	3
4	Sitar Tan	Wayne Zhang	"Firework" (English)	Katy Perry			Nick Pyo	6	—
5	A-Lin	Shen Ling	"爱"	Karen Mok	Francis Lee	Diane Chen	遊政豪	2	
6	Hsiao Huang-Chi	Yan Wei	"让"	Aska Yang	Daryl Yao	Hsiao Huang Chi	Yao Hung	7	—
7	Sun Nan	Li Rui	"講不出再見" (Cantonese)	Alan Tam	Jolland Chan	Cho Yong Pil; Senke Kazuya	Baby Chung	1	
7	Sun Nan	Li Rui	"不见不散" (Mandarin)	Sun Nan	張和平	三 寶	Baby Chung	1	

==== Overall ranking ====
I Am a Singer Season 3 4th round overall ranking
Ranking	Singer	Match 1 Percentages of Votes (Ranking)	Match 2 Percentages of Votes (Ranking)	Total Percentages of Votes
1	The One	24.02% (1)	12.80% (3)	18.41%
2	Sun Nan	11.60% (5)	23.86% (1)	17.73%
3	A-Lin	9.91% (7)	23.66% (2)	16.78%
4	Li Jian	17.63% (2)	9.46% (5)	13.54%
5	Han Hong	11.02% (6)	12.53% (4)	11.77%
6	Hsiao Huang Chi	13.88% (3)	8.33% (7)	11.10%
7	Sitar Tan	11.90% (4)	9.33% (6)	10.61%

=== Breakout ===
- Taping Date: March 12, 2015
- Airdate: March 20, 2015,

Three of the six singers who were initial singers (A-Lin, Han and Sun) were exempt for this round, while the other three singers participated with previously eliminated singers for a chance to enter the finals. The order was determined based on the contestant's status quo and their duration on the stage. All but five singers went through ballot to decide the order; Hsiao, Jian and The One selected their performance freely, while unsuccessful challengers (Ronghao and Lee) were defaulted to the first two performances. Zhang was initially eligible to participate, but later declined due to her decision to focus on her new album release on March 11, 2015.

The singers sang one song, with the four singers having the most votes qualifying for the finals. During the results, the initial vote count (media) revealed that Jian was ranked first, followed by The One, Tan, and Ku. Initial vote count (managers) revealed that Li Jian was ranked first, The One and Tan were tied for second, and Hsiao and Ronghao were tied for fourth.

After the final results were released, Jian, Tan, Hu and The One were the top four singers receiving the highest number of votes and advanced to the finals.

I Am a Singer Season 3 Breakout March 20, 2015, Host: Sun Nan
Order of Performance	Singer	Comedian Manager	Song Title	Original Singer	Lyrics	Composer	Arranger	Ranking	Singer Voting	Media Voting
1	Jess Lee	Rolling Wang	"寂寞先生"	Gary Chaw	小寒	Gary Chaw	生命樹小王子	8	–	—
2	Li Ronghao	Belinda	"小芳"	Li Chunbo			Li Ronghao	9	–	4 (Tie)
3	Kit Chan	Tian Yuan	"左右手" (Cantonese)	Leslie Cheung	Lan Xi	葉良俊	Kubert Leung	5	–	—
4	Leo Ku	Wang Qiao	"愛是永恆" (Cantonese)	Jacky Cheung	Richard Lam	Dick Lee	Nick Pyo	6	4	—
5	Tiger Hu	Wu Yang	"你的背包"	Eason Chan	Lin Xi	蔡政勳	Tiger Hu 谷慄 ^{[a]}	3	—	—
6	Sitar Tan	Wayne Zhang	"烏兰巴托的夜"	G.Purevdorj	Jia Zhangke; Zuoxiao Zuzhou	普日佈道爾吉	劉迦寧 周以力	2	3	2 (Tie)
7	The One	Tanas	"那片海"	Han Hong			Kim Hyung Kyu; Son Young Jim	4	2	2 (Tie)
8	Hsiao Huang Chi	Yan Wei	"夜夜夜夜"	Chyi Chin	Panda		Baby Chung	7	–	4 (Tie)
9	Li Jian	Shen Mengchen	"假如愛有天意"	韓成民	Li Jian	劉永石	劉卓	1		

=== Final Round ===
- Airdate: March 27, 2015

The Finals was divided into two rounds, with the first song being a duet with a guest singer, and the second song being a solo encore performance. For the first time in I Am a Singer history, votes were the sole determinant towards the results, and the winner is determined on which singer received a higher accumulated votes.

==== 1st round ====
The first round of the finals was the guest singers' duet. The order was determined through balloting, The singer receiving the lowest number of votes after the first round was eliminated from the competition; A-Lin would have been eliminated for finishing last; however, she was later advanced to the 2nd round after Sun withdraw from the competition prior to the results for personal reasons, citing about his placement in the round. Had it not been for Sun Nan's withdrawal, he would've performed "白天不懂夜的黑" as his encore song.

I Am a Singer Season 3 1st Final Round March 27, 2015, Host: Wang Han
Order of Performance	Singer	Comedian Manager	Help Singer	Song Title	Original Singer	Lyrics	Composer	Arranger	Ranking
1	Li Jian	Shen Mengchen	Wu Xiubo	"朋友第一" medley				劉卓	5
1	Li Jian	Shen Mengchen	Wu Xiubo	"和自己賽跑的人"	Jonathan Lee			劉卓	5
1	Li Jian	Shen Mengchen	Wu Xiubo	"朋友"	Chyi Chin (Mandarin)	陳小霞		劉卓	5
1	Li Jian	Shen Mengchen	Wu Xiubo	"朋友"	Alan Tam (Cantonese)	Jolland Chan	芹澤廣明	劉卓	5
2	Tiger Hu	Wu Yang	David Tao	"Black Tangerine" (Mandarin)	David Tao	David Tao 陳玉貞	David Tao	Tiger Hu 谷慄	4
3	The One	Tanas	Lyn	"I Believe" (Korean)	Shin Seung Hun	Yang Jae Sun	Kim Hyung Suk	Kwon Sukhong	3
4	Sitar Tan	Wayne Zhang	Cui Jian	"鱼鸟之恋"	Cui Jian	Cui Jian			2
5	A-Lin	Shen Ling	Shin	"狂風裡擁抱"	A-Lin; Shin	Daryl Yao	方炯鑌	沙維琪	6
6	Sun Nan	Li Rui	Dai Yuqiang	"你快回來"	Sun Nan	劉沁		撈仔	– ^{[a]}
6	Sun Nan	Li Rui	Dai Yuqiang	"Nessun Dorma" (Italian)	Miguel Fleta	Giacomo Puccini		撈仔	– ^{[a]}
7	Han Hong	Jackie Tam	Eason Chan	"十年" (Mandarin)	Eason Chan	Lin Xi	陳小霞	Kubert Leung	1

A. Sun withdrew from the competition prior to the results. He was ranked fourth during this round, but his performance was excluded from the tally.

==== 2nd round ====
The second round of the finals was the encore song segment. The order of performance for this round was determined by the "First and Last" duel sequence based on the results of the first round, with the order being: 3rd, 4th, 2nd, 5th, 1st and 6th.

I Am a Singer Season 3 2nd Final Round March 27, 2015, Host: Wang Han
Order of Performance	Singer	Comedian Manager	Song Title	Original Singer	Lyrics	Composer	Arranger	Final Results
1	The One	Tanas	"愛情啊"	The One	The One; Evis WY	Bae Zzang; Gae Mi	Kwon Sukhong	3
2	Tiger Hu	Wu Yang	"娘子"	Jay Chou	Vincent Fang	Jay Chou	Hu Yanbin 谷慄	—
3	Sitar Tan	Wayne Zhang	"如果有來生"	Sitar Tan	Gao Xiaosong	格非	劉迦寧 周以力	—
4	Li Jian	Shen Mengchen	"故鄉山川"	Li Jian			劉 卓	2
4	Li Jian	Shen Mengchen	"烏蘇裡船歌"	侯 旭	郭頌 胡小石	汪雲才 郭 頌	劉 卓	2
5	Han Hong	Jackie Tam	"天路"	Angel; Han Hong; Tan Weiwei	屈原	Yin Qing	金武林; Rama Liu	1
6	A-Lin	Shen Ling	"柠檬草的味道"	Jolin Tsai	Francis Lee	Lee Shih Shiong	陳飛午	—

==== Overall ranking (winner of battle) ====
Before the final results were announced, the host named The One, Jian and Han as the "Ultimate Winner Candidates". Han was declared the winner with 44.35% of the votes, beating Jian's 33.06% and The One's 22.58% of the votes cast. The percentages reflected in the table counted only the votes of the three aforementioned singers.

I Am a Singer Season 3 Ranking of Winner of Battle
Ranking	Singer	Total Percentages of Votes
1	Han Hong	44.35%
2	Li Jian	33.06%
3	The One	22.58%

=== Biennial Concert ===
- Airdate: April 3, 2015

The concert featured 12 singers from the three seasons: Huang Qishan and Aska Yang from Season 1; Han Lei, Gary Chaw, Jason Zhang and Bibi Zhou from Season 2; and the top six finalists (Han, Jian, The One, Tan, Hu and A-Lin) from Season 3.

I Am a Singer Season 3 2015 Biennial Concert April 3, 2015, Host: Shen Mengchen
Group of Performance	Order of Performance	Singer	Song Title	Original Singer	Lyrics	Composer	Arranger
I	1	Sitar Tan	"要死就一定要死在你手裡"	莫西子詩	俞心樵	莫西子詩	劉迦寧 陳偉倫 黎偌天
I	2	Bibi Zhou	"Uptown Funk" (English)	Mark Ronson; Bruno Mars	Devon Christopher Gallaspy; Mark Ronson; Bruno Mars; Joseph Nicholaus Williams; Philip Martin Lawrence II; Jeffrey Bhasker		Kubert Leung
II	3	Aska Yang	"長鏡頭"	Na Ying	小寒	Tanya Chua	Kubert Leung
II	4	Li Jian	"車站"	Akina Nakamori	Li Jian	竹內瑪莉亞	劉卓
III	5	Tiger Hu	"原來你什麼都不想要"	A-mei	鄔裕康	郭 子	Tiger Hu 谷慄
III	6	Gary Chaw	"明天會更好"	Various Singers (60 singers)	Lo Ta-yu; Zhang Dachun 許乃勝; Lee Shou-chuan 邱復生; Chang Ai-chia; Hung-Tze Jan	Lo Ta-yu	塗惠源
III	6	Gary Chaw	"We Are The World" (English)	USA for Africa	Michael Jackson; Lionel Richie		塗惠源
IV	7	Huang Qishan	"燈塔"	Huang Qishan	梁芒	Traditional Hymn folk song	Nick Pyo
IV	8	The One	"秋意濃"	Jacky Cheung	Daryl Yao	Kōji Tamaki	Kim Hyung Kyu; Jeon Dawoon
V	9	A-Lin	"聽見下雨的聲音"	Queen	Vincent Fang	Jay Chou	陳飛午
V	10	Jason Zhang	"Earth Song" (Mandarin)	Michael Jackson			劉迦寧 周以力
VI	11	Han Lei	"雁南飛"	單秀榮	李俊	Lee Wai Choi	吳陽
VI	11	Han Lei	"呼倫貝爾大草原"	德德瑪	克明	烏蘭托嘎	吳陽
VI	12	Han Hong	"一杯美酒"	Uighurs folk song	艾克拜爾	Uighur folk song	Rama Liu
VI	12	Han Hong	"樓蘭姑娘"	Arken Abdulla			Rama Liu
