= Singer season 1 =

Singer
- Season 1
- Hosted by: Hu Haiquan (Episode 1, 3-10, Repechage, Semifinal); Chen Yufan (Episode 2); Sha Baoliang, He Jiong, Wang Han (final round)
- Judges: 500 public audiences
- Winner: Yu Quan
- Runner-up: Terry Lin
- Finals venue: Hunan Broadcasting System

Release
- Original network: Hunan Television
- Original release: January 18 – April 12, 2013

Season chronology
- Next → Season 2

I Am a Singer (Chinese: 我是歌手; pinyin: Wǒ Shì Gēshǒu) is a Chinese version of the Korean reality show I Am a Singer and it is broadcast on Hunan Television. The show's first season premiered on January 18, 2013. The competitions was divided into five rounds (each round comprising two episodes), and the final phase having three episodes which was not included in the Korean version (Revival Round (which would later be called Breakout Round in the next season), Semifinals and Finals), giving the series a total of 13 episodes. Each round features seven singers performing in front of 500 public audiences to judge. The first episode of each round doesn't has any singer eliminated, but subsequent episodes will eliminate one singer, which was decided on which singers received a lower count of votes, while a new singer will substitute the eliminated singer in the following episode.

Chinese music duo Yu Quan, which consists of members Chen Yufan (陳羽凡) and Hu Haiquan (胡海泉), were the inaugural winners of I Am a Singer on the finale aired live broadcast on April 12, 2013.

== Production ==
I Am a Singer consist of 13 weeks of shows. The first 10 episodes were competition stage divided by five rounds of two episodes, each having a Qualifier and a Knockout round; followed by a Revival episode, Semi-finals and Grand finals. Each episode have a lineup of seven singers competing for the votes of the 500-member studio audience, with a role to decide the outcome at the end of the episode; each member will cast a vote of three singers of their preference, while the semi-finals round onwards changes to a single vote. These votes are accumulative over two episodes and the singer receiving the lowest votes after the Knockout round was eliminated, after which a new round begins with the vote count reset and a new singer will substitute in the place for the previously-eliminated singer.

Each singer was also assigned by the production to a manager or Music Partner, who would serve as an advisor for the singer; when the singer is voted out, the corresponding Music Partner will also be eliminated. Each show (except for the finals) do not have a fixed host, but the host was chosen from one of any eligible singers doubling as a role of the host; like Music Partners, singers will forfeit the hosting role upon their elimination.

=== Revival round ===
The season was originally announced to last 12 weeks without a Revival round; on Week 8, producer Hong Tao announced the Revival round will be added between the fifth Knockout and the semi-finals. Held after the final Knockout round on Week 11, the five previously eliminated singers (except Chyi Chin, due to his withdrawal) compete for the seventh and final place in the semi-finals. Each singer performed two songs, a rendition and an original, with votes cast in-between rounds. These votes are accumulative and the singer receiving a higher vote will be reinstated from the competition.

The season only featured eliminated singers while remaining singers (both initial and substitute singers) were exempt from the round; beginning on the next season, substitute singers were required to participate in the Revival round, due to time constraints and a lineup of many singers, singers sang only one song for the round.

=== Finals ===
The Grand finals were held live on April 12, 2013 over 4-hours starting at 7.30pm. Singers each compete for the title by performing two songs, a duet with a guest performer, and a solo. Votes cast after each round carries a percentage which would be converted into a score to determine the winning singer. The finals also invited previously eliminated and withdrawn singers to perform an additional, returning performance. This is the only season to date to do so; starting in the next season, though not mentioned or otherwise, only eliminated singers were invited to watch the performance.

== Contestants ==
The following I Am a Singer season one contestants are listed in alphabetical order. Singers without a placement for the final are listed as finalists, and singers who withdrew are listed as withdrawn.

Key:

– Winner
– Runner-up
– Other finalist
– Withdrew

Contestant	Country	Manager	Status	Week Entered	Week Exited	Result
Chen Ming	China	Wang Qiao	Initial singer	Week 1 (qualifying round 1)	Week 6 (knockout round 3); Week 11 (Revival round)	Eliminated
Chyi Chin	Taiwan	Li Rui	Initial singer	Week 1 (qualifying round 1)	Week 4 (knockout round 2) (Note: While Chyi Chin's withdrawal on Week 4 was announced as temporary, his withdrawal was not confirmed until Week 7 (qualifying round 4).)	Withdrew
Winnie Hsin	Taiwan	KK	Substitute singer	Week 7 (qualifying round 4)	Week 13 (finals)	Finalist (4th–7th place)
Huang Qishan	China	Du Haitao	Initial singer	Week 1 (qualifying round 1)	Week 13 (finals)	Third place
Terry Lin	Taiwan	Shen Mengchen	Initial singer	Week 1 (qualifying round 1)	Week 13 (finals)	Runner-up
Julia Peng	Taiwan	Xiao Yanzi	Substitute singer	Week 9 (qualifying round 5)	Week 13 (finals)	Finalist (4th–7th place)
Sha Baoliang	China	YOYO	Initial singer	Week 1 (qualifying round 1)	Week 11 (Revival round)	Eliminated
Shang Wenjie	China	Wu Xin	Initial singer	Week 1 (qualifying round 1)	Week 8 (knockout round 3); Week 11 (Revival round)	Eliminated
Paul Wong	Hong Kong	Wayne Zhang	Initial singer	Week 1 (qualifying round 1)	Week 2 (knockout round 1); Week 11 (Revival round)	Eliminated
Aska Yang	Taiwan	Tian Yuan	Substitute singer	Week 3 (qualifying round 2); Week 11 (Revival round)	Week 4 (knockout round 2); Week 13 (finals)	Finalist (4th–7th place)
Yu Quan	China	Li Weijia	Initial singer	Week 1 (qualifying round 1)	Week 13 (finals)	Winner
Zhou Xiao'ou	China	Shen Ling	Substitute singer	Week 5 (qualifying round 3)	Week 13 (finals)	Finalist (4th–7th place)

=== Future appearances ===
Yu Quan, Terry Lin, Aska Yang, Julia Peng and Shang Wenjie appeared as guest performers on the Biennial concert on the following season. Yu Quan also appeared on the same season as a guest performer in the premiere episode, while Huang Qishan returned on the finals as a guest assistant singer during round one. Huang and Yang appeared again on the Biennial concert on the third season. Zhou Xiao'ou returned as a guest assistant singer, while Yu Quan returned again (along with Han Lei and Han Hong) on a special Winners exhibition performance on the finals on the fourth season.

Lin and Peng again returned as contestants, while Yang and Shang appear as guest assistant singers in the final episode, both on the fifth season.

== Results ==
First	Safe	Bottom	Eliminated	Return Performance	Repechage Success	Repechage Failure	Winner	Runner-up	Withdrew

	Singer	Broadcast Date (2013)														
	Singer	18 Jan	25 Jan	1 Feb	8 Feb	15 Feb	22 Feb	1 Mar	8 Mar	15 Mar	22 Mar	29 Mar	5 Apr	12 Apr		
	Singer	1st Round		2nd Round		3rd Round		4th Round		5th Round		Repechage	Semifinal	Final Round		
	Singer	Qualifying	Knockout	Qualifying	Knockout	Qualifying	Knockout	Qualifying	Knockout	Qualifying	Knockout	Repechage	Semifinal	1st Round	2nd Round	Overall
1	Yu Quan	2	1	4	1	2	6	4	4	2	2	—	3	1	2	1
2	Terry Lin	—	—	—	—	1	3	2	1	1	3	—	2	2	1	2
=3	Huang Qishan	6	2	1	3	4	1	1	3	4	6	—	6	3	—	—
=3	Aska Yang	—	—	7	5	—	—	—	—	—	—	1	1	3	—	—
=3	Julia Peng	—	—	—	—	—	—	—	—	3	4	—	4	5	—	—
=3	Winnie Hsin	—	—	—	—	—	—	3	6	6	5	—	7	6	—	—
=3	Zhou Xiao'ou	—	—	—	—	3	5	7	2	7	1	—	5	7	—	—
=8	Sha Baoliang	5	3	6	2	7	4	6	5	5	7	—	—	—	—	—
=8	Shang Wenjie	4	4	3	5	6	2	5	7	—	—	—	—	—	—	—
=8	Chen Ming	7	6	5	4	5	7	—	—	—	—	—	—	—	—	—
=8	Paul Wong	3	7	—	—	—	—	—	—	—	—	—	—	—	—	—
=8	Chyi Chin	1	5	2	7	—	—	—	—	—	—	—	—	—	—	—

== Competition details ==
=== 1st round ===
==== Qualifying ====
- Taping Date: January 10, 2013
- Airdate: January 18, 2013

I Am a Singer Season 1 1st Qualifying round January 18, 2013 Host: Hu Haiquan
Order of Performance	Singer	Comedian Manager	Song Title	Original Singer	Lyrics	Composer	Arranger	Ranking
1	Yu Quan	Li Weijia	"心似狂潮"	Yu Quan	Hu Haiquan		Yu Quan	2
2	Chen Ming	Wang Qiao	"等你愛我"	Chen Ming; Eason Chan	小柯		Kubert Leung	7
3	Shang Wenjie	Wu Xin	"最终信仰"	Shang Wenjie	唐恬; Shang Wenjie	Shang Wenjie	Daniel Merior	4
4	Paul Wong	Wayne Zhang	"海阔天空" (Cantonese)	Beyond	Wong Ka Kui		Beyond; Yang Bang Ean	3
5	Huang Qishan	Du Haitao	"等待"	Huang Qishan	Wang Feng		Kubert Leung	6
6	Sha Baoliang	YOYO	"飄"	Sha Baoliang	老沫	三寶	Kubert Leung	5
7	Chyi Chin	Li Rui	"夜夜夜夜"	Chyi Chin	Panda		江建民	1

==== Knockout ====
- Taping Date: January 17, 2013
- Airdate: January 25, 2013

I Am a Singer Season 1 1st Knockout Round January 25, 2013 Host: Chen Yufan
Order of Performance	Singer	Comedian Manager	Song Title	Original Singer	Lyrics	Composer	Arranger	Ranking
1	Huang Qishan	Du Haitao	"离不开你"	Liu Huan	劉文歧	Liu Huan	Kubert Leung 黃綺珊音樂工作室	2
2	Chyi Chin	Li Rui	"用心良苦"	Phil Chang	Tracy	Chang Yu	鐘宗豪	5
3	Shang Wenjie	Wu Xin	"你怎么舍得我难过"	Huang Ping Yuan			劉卓	4
4	Chen Ming	Wang Qiao	"當我想你的時候"	Wang Feng			Kim Ji Mun	6
5	Sha Baoliang	YOYO	"秋意濃"	Jacky Cheung	Daryl Yao	Kōji Tamaki	Kubert Leung	3
6	Paul Wong	Wayne Zhang	"吻别"	Jacky Cheung	何啟弘	Philip Yin	Wong Koon Chung	7
7	Yu Quan	Li Weijia	"燭光裡的媽媽"	Mao Amin	王健 李春莉	谷建芬	Yu Quan	1

==== Overall ranking ====
I Am a Singer Season 1 1st Round Overall ranking
Ranking	Singer	Total Votes	Total Percentages of Votes
1	Yu Quan	661	22.12%
2	Chyi Chin	492	16.46%
3	Huang Qishan	475	15.90%
4	Sha Baoliang	388	12.98%
5	Shang Wenjie	381	12.75%
6	Chen Ming	301	10.07%
7	Paul Wong	290	9.70%
Total Votes		2988 ^{[a]}	99.98%

A. The total votes does not include 12 rejected votes.

=== 2nd round ===
==== Qualifying ====
- Taping Date: January 25, 2013
- Airdate: February 1, 2013

The first substitute singer of the season was Aska Yang.

I Am a Singer Season 1 2nd Qualifying round February 1, 2013 Host: Hu Haiquan
Order of Performance	Singer	Comedian Manager	Song Title	Original Singer	Lyrics	Composer	Arranger	Ranking
1	Sha Baoliang	YOYO	"瀏陽河" (Folk song)	Li Guyi	徐叔華	朱立奇 唐璧光	Kubert Leung	6
2	Shang Wenjie	Wu Xin	"Let's Get It Started" (English)	The Black Eyed Peas			Kubert Leung	3
3	Yu Quan	Li Weijia	"老男孩" (Mandarin)	Chopstick Brothers	Wang Taili	大橋卓彌	Yu Quan	4
4	Chen Ming	Wang Qiao	"情人的眼淚"	Pan Xiuqiong	陳蝶衣	Yao Min	Kim Ji Mun	5
4	Chen Ming	Wang Qiao	"思念是一種病"	Chyi Chin	虹樂隊		Kim Ji Mun	5
5	Chyi Chin	Li Rui	"張三的歌"	Lee Shou-chuan; Blue Bird Flying Fish; Jocelyn How	張子石	李壽全	江建民	2
6	Huang Qishan	Du Haitao	"I Will Always Love You" (English)	Whitney Houston			劉卓	1
7	Aska Yang	Tian Yuan	"矜持"	Faye Wong	許常德	郭子	王文穎	7
8	Paul Wong	Wayne Zhang	"我終於失去了你"	Chao Chuan	Jonathan Lee		Paul Wong	Return Performance

==== Knockout ====
- Taping Date: January 31, 2013
- Airdate: February 8, 2013

During this week, Chen was originally going to perform a medley of two songs with "悶" and "心痛的感覺", but later reversed after initially hesitated on her performance during rehearsal. Chin temporary withdrew from the competition earlier this week due to family reasons. The eliminations for the Knockout round went ahead as normal.

I Am a Singer Season 1 2nd Knockout Round January 25, 2013 Host: Hu Haiquan
Order of Performance	Singer	Comedian Manager	Song Title	Original Singer	Lyrics	Composer	Arranger	Ranking
1	Chyi Chin	Li Rui	"如果雲知道"	Valen Hsu	季忠平 許常德	季忠平	Baby Chung	7
2	Sha Baoliang	YOYO	"你把我灌醉"	David Wong	Daryl Yao	David Wong	Kubert Leung	2
3	Yu Quan	Li Weijia	"熱情的沙漠"	Harlem Hsu; Ou-Yang-Fei-Fei	李潔心	加瀨邦彥 山上路夫	Kubert Leung	1
4	Huang Qishan	Du Haitao	"跟着感覺走"	Su Rui	陳家麗	陳志遠	Kubert Leung	3
5	Chen Ming	Wang Qiao	"心痛的感覺"	Su Rui	邰肇玟		丁寧	4
6	Aska Yang	Tian Yuan	"征服"	Na Ying; Kwon Yan Yan	John		Kubert Leung	5 (Tie)
7	Shang Wenjie	Wu Xin	"可惜不是你"	Fish Leong	Francis Lee	曹軒賓	Kubert Leung	5 (Tie)

==== Overall ranking ====
I Am a Singer Season 1 2nd Round Overall ranking
Ranking	Singer	Match 1 Percentages of Votes (Ranking)	Match 2 Percentages of Votes (Ranking)	Total Percentages of Votes
1	Huang Qishan	26.21% (1)	15.69% (3)	20.65%
2	Yu Quan	12.73% (4)	27.38% (1)	20.48%
3	Sha Baoliang	9.13% (6)	16.70% (2)	13.13%
4	Shang Wenjie	16.32% (3)	10.15% (5)	13.06%
5	Chen Ming	11.83% (5)	12.49% (4)	12.18%
6	Chyi Chin	16.40% (2)	7.41% (7)	11.65%
7	Aska Yang	7.34% (7)	10.15% (5)	8.82%

=== 3rd round ===
==== Qualifying ====
- Taping Date: February 7, 2013
- Airdate: February 15, 2013

Due to Chin's temporary withdrawal, one more singer for a total of two singers substituted the singers; they were Terry Lin and Zhou Xiao'ou.

I Am a Singer Season 1 3rd Qualifying round February 7, 2013 Host: Hu Haiquan
Order of Performance	Singer	Comedian Manager	Song Title	Original Singer	Lyrics	Composer	Arranger	Ranking
1	Terry Lin	Shen Mengchen	"沒離開過"	Terry Lin	樓南蔚	Sam Watters	Keith Stuart	1
2	Yu Quan	Li Weijia	"再回首"	Jiang Yuheng	陳樂融	Lowell Lo	Yu Quan	2
3	Shang Wenjie	Wu Xin	"Man In The Mirror" (English)	Michael Jackson; Wang Leehom	Glen Ballard	Siedah Garrett	Kubert Leung	6
4	Huang Qishan	Du Haitao	"牽手"	Su Rui; Sharon Au	李子恆		Kubert Leung	4
5	Chen Ming	Wang Qiao	"日不落"	Jolin Tsai	崔惟楷	Bodies Without Organs	Kubert Leung	5
6	Sha Baoliang	YOYO	"女人的選擇"	Jiang Yuheng	許常德	Lee Young Hun	Kubert Leung	7
7	Zhou Xiao'ou	Shen Ling	"愛不愛我"	Zero Band			欒樹	3
8	Aska Yang	Tian Yuan	"空白格"	Tanya Chua			Kubert Leung	Return Performance

==== Knockout ====
- Taping Date: February 14, 2013
- Airdate: February 22, 2013

During this week, Sha volunteered to perform first as he was urgent on traveling to Beijing for the 2013 CCTV New Year's Gala, thus he was absent during the results; however, Sha was informed of the outcome via satellite telephone link from Beijing.

I Am a Singer Season 1 3rd Knockout Round February 22, 2013 Host: Hu Haiquan
Order of Performance	Singer	Comedian Manager	Song Title	Original Singer	Lyrics	Composer	Arranger	Ranking
1	Sha Baoliang	YOYO	"讓每個人都心碎"	David Wong; A-Mei	陳家麗	David Wong	Kubert Leung	4
2	Yu Quan	Li Weijia	"我想有個家"	Ben How; Pan Mei Chen	Pan Mei Chen		Yu Quan	6
3	Shang Wenjie	Wu Xin	"王妃"	Jam Hsiao	陳鎮川	Lee Shih Shiong	Kubert Leung	2
4	Chen Ming	Wang Qiao	"新不了情"	One-Fang	黃鬱	Chris Babida	丁寧	7
5	Terry Lin	Shen Mengchen	"烟花易冷"	Jay Chou	Vincent Fang	Jay Chou	Kubert Leung 阮德軍	3
6	Zhou Xiao'ou	Shen Ling	"天空"	Faye Wong	黃桂蘭	楊明煌	欒樹	5
7	Huang Qishan	Du Haitao	"回來"	Luo Qi	洛兵	周迪	Pyo Keun Soo	1

==== Overall ranking ====
I Am a Singer Season 1 3rd Round Overall ranking
Ranking	Singer	Match 1 Percentages of Votes (Ranking)	Match 2 Percentages of Votes (Ranking)	Total Percentages of Votes
1	Huang Qishan	15.51% (4) ^{[a]}	29.10% (1)*	22.48%
2	Terry Lin	21.86% (1)	14.62% (3)	18.15%
3	Shang Wenjie	11.49% (6) ^{[b]}	15.35% (2)	13.47%
4	Zhou Xiao'ou	15.58% (3)	11.13% (5)	13.30%
5	Yu Quan	17.06% (2)	8.98% (6)	12.92%
6	Sha Baoliang	6.91% (7)	13.07% (4)	10.07%
7	Chen Ming	11.56% (5)	7.71% (7)	9.59%

A. Has one vote difference between 3rd place singer
B. Has one vote difference between 5th place singer
*highest percentage of votes for any singer during the main competition of "Singer" for eight consecutive seasons

=== 4th round ===
==== Qualifying ====
- Taping Date: February 21, 2013
- Airdate: March 1, 2013

The fourth substitute singer of the season was Winnie Hsin. Chin, who announced his temporary withdrawal on week four, confirmed on this episode that he will permanently withdrawal from the competition due to mother's health. Lin initially performed "無字歌" but later changed it to "Opera" (instrumental) because his performance was identical to Huang's.

I Am a Singer Season 1 4th Qualifying round February 21, 2013 Host: Hu Haiquan
Order of Performance	Singer	Comedian Manager	Song Title	Original Singer	Lyrics	Composer	Arranger	Ranking
1	Sha Baoliang	YOYO	"鴻雁"	Husileng	呂燕衛	張宏光	Kubert Leung 達日丹	6
2	Huang Qishan	Du Haitao	"The Power of Love" (English)	Jennifer Rush	Gunther Mende; Candy DeRouge; Jennifer Rush; Mary Susan Applegate		劉卓	1
3	Shang Wenjie	Wu Xin	"Moves Like Jagger" (English)	Maroon 5	Adam Levine; Benny Blanco; Ammar Malik; Shellback		Kubert Leung	5
4	Yu Quan	Li Weijia	"大中国"	Gao Fong			Yu Quan	4
4	Yu Quan	Li Weijia	"We Will Rock You" (English)	Queen	Brian May		Yu Quan	4
5	Terry Lin	Shen Mengchen	"Opera"	Vitas	—	Vitas	Kubert Leung 屠穎 韓賢光	2
6	Zhou Xiao'ou	Shen Ling	"無情的雨無情的你"	Chyi Chin	董榮駿		欒樹	7
7	Winnie Hsin	KK	"领悟"	Winnie Hsin	Jonathan Lee		Jenny Chin; Mac Chew	3
8	Chen Ming	Wang Qiao	"听说愛情回來过"	Sandy Lam	Lee Shih Shiong		Kubert Leung	Return Performance

==== Knockout ====
- Taping Date: February 28, 2013
- Airdate: March 8, 2013

For this episode, the songs (dubbed as "Pot Luck") are determined by the audience online. Each singer chose three songs which he or she did not want to sing. If the audience picked one of these songs, the singer could choose another.

I Am a Singer Season 1 4th Knockout Round March 8, 2013 Host: Hu Haiquan
Order of Performance	Singer	Comedian Manager	Song Title	Original Singer	Lyrics	Composer	Arranger	Ranking
1	Sha Baoliang	YOYO	"你快回來"	Sun Nan	劉沁		Kamada Toshiya; Funayama Motoki	5
2	Huang Qishan	Du Haitao	"让我一次爱个夠"	Harlem Yu	陳家麗	Harlem Yu	Pyo Keun Soo	3
3	Winnie Hsin	KK	"至少還有你"	Sandy Lam	Lin Xi	Davy Chan	Koji Sakurai	6
4	Zhou Xiao'ou	Shen Ling	"無地自容"	Black Panther	Dou Wei	李彤	欒樹 張張	2
5	Shang Wenjie	Wu Xin	"Super Star"	S.H.E	Derek Shih	Jade Valerie Villalon; Roberto Geoman Rosan	Kubert Leung	7
6	Yu Quan	Li Weijia	"爱"	Little Tigers	陳大力 李子恆	陳大力	Yu Quan 劉卓	4
7	Terry Lin	Shen Mengchen	"你的眼神"	Tsai Chin	蘇來		Kubert Leung	1

==== Overall ranking ====
I Am a Singer Season 1 4th Round Overall ranking
Ranking	Singer	Match 1 Percentages of Votes (Ranking)	Match 2 Percentages of Votes (Ranking)	Total Percentages of Votes
1	Huang Qishan	27.90% (1)	17.63% (3)	22.78%
2	Terry Lin	18.14% (2)	27.25% (1)	22.70%
3	Yu Quan	15.16% (4)	13.36% (4)	14.26%
4	Zhou Xiao'ou	5.83% (7)	20.30% (2)	13.07%
5	Winnie Hsin	15.58% (3)	6.68% (6)	11.13%
6	Sha Baoliang	7.75% (6)	10.75% (5)	9.25%
7	Shang Wenjie	9.60% (5)	4.00% (7)	6.80%

=== 5th round ===
==== Qualifying (final qualifying round) ====
- Taping Date: March 7, 2013
- Airdate: March 15, 2013

The fifth and last substitute singer of the season was Julia Peng. Hsin was initially going to perform "一样的月光" but later changed to "親愛的小孩" to pay respect to the victims of the baby murdering case in Changchun, occurred three days prior to the taping.

I Am a Singer Season 1 5th Qualifying round (Final Qualifying round) March 15, 2013 Host: Hu Haiquan
Order of Performance	Singer	Comedian Manager	Song Title	Original Singer	Lyrics	Composer	Arranger	Ranking
1	Huang Qishan	Du Haitao	"剪愛"	A-mei	Eric Lin	塗惠源	劉卓	4
2	Terry Lin	Shen Mengchen	"Making Love Out of Nothing At All" (English)	Air Supply	Jim Steinman		Kubert Leung 劉敏宏	1
3	Yu Quan	Li Weijia	"男人哭吧不是罪"	Andy Lau		Liu Tianjian	Kamada Toshiya; Ishiduka Tomoki	2
4	Sha Baoliang	YOYO	"死了都要愛"	Shin	Daryl Yao	Yoo Hae-jun	Kamada Toshiya; Munakata Hitoshi	5
5	Winnie Hsin	KK	"親愛的小孩"	Su Rui	楊立德	陳復明	Kubert Leung	6
6	Zhou Xiao'ou	Shen Ling	"不再掩飾"	Cui Jian			欒樹	7
7	Julia Peng	Xiao Yanzi	"走在红毯那一天"	Julia Peng	Preston Lee	Chen Kuo Hua	Kubert Leung	3
8	Shang Wenjie	Wu Xin	"Dog Days Are Over" (English)	Florence and the Machine	Florence Welch; Isabella Summers		Kubert Leung	Return Performance

==== Knockout (final knockout round) ====
- Taping Date: March 15, 2013
- Airdate: March 22, 2013

For this episode, singers had to sing at least one song that pays tribute to Chyi Chin (who withdrew from the competition after week 7).

I Am a Singer Season 1 5th Knockout Round (Final Knockout Round) March 22, 2013 Host: Hu Haiquan
Order of Performance	Singer	Comedian Manager	Song Title	Original Singer	Lyrics	Composer	Arranger	Ranking
1	Terry Lin	Shen Mengchen	"夜夜夜夜"	Chyi Chin	Panda		Kubert Leung 薛位山	3
2	Julia Peng	Xiao Yanzi	"殘酷的溫柔"	Chyi Chin	Li Gedi	Chyi Chin	Kubert Leung	4
3	Huang Qishan	Du Haitao	"不讓我的眼淚陪我過夜"	Chyi Chin	白進法	張真 呂禎	Pyo Keun Soo	6
4	Yu Quan	Li Weijia	"狂流"	Chyi Chin	戚小戀	Chyi Chin 黃大軍	Yu Quan; Liu Zhuo	2
5	Sha Baoliang	YOYO	"往事隨風"	Chyi Chin	Adam Hsu	塗惠源	Kamada Toshiya; Munakata Hitoshi	7
6	Winnie Hsin	KK	"原來的我"	Chyi Chin	呂承明	Aska	Mike Mdaughlin	5
7	Zhou Xiao'ou	Shen Ling	"愛情宣言"	Chyi Chin	Chyi Chin 王念慈	Chyi Chin	欒樹; Zhang Zhang; Li Jiujung	1
7	Zhou Xiao'ou	Shen Ling	"九個太陽"	Chyi Chin	Chyi Chin	Chyi Chin	欒樹; Zhang Zhang; Li Jiujung	1
8	Chyi Chin	Wu Xin	"我只在乎你"	Teresa Teng	Shen Zhi	三木剛	江建民	Return Performance

==== Overall ranking ====
I Am a Singer Season 1 5th Round Overall ranking
Ranking	Singer	Match 1 Percentages of Votes (Ranking)	Match 1 Percentages of Votes (Ranking)	Total Percentages of Votes
1	Terry Lin	27.15% (1)	19.57% (3)	23.07%
2	Yu Quan	16.67% (2)	21.44% (2)	19.23%
3	Zhou Xiao'ou	8.37% (7)	22.17% (1)	15.79%
4	Julia Peng	15.20% (3)	12.35% (4)	13.67%
5	Huang Qishan	13.80% (4)	8.28% (6)	11.04%
6	Winnie Hsin	9.07% (6)	8.95% (5)	9.00%
7	Sha Baoliang	9.69% (5)	7.21% (7)	8.36%

=== Revival ===
- Taping Date: March 21, 2013
- Airdate: March 29, 2013

In this Revival round, five of the six eliminated singers (with the exception of Chin) will participate in a chance to enter the semi-finals. Each singer sang two songs, and the singer having the most combined votes after the two songs was reinstated in the competition. For this week, the order of performances is decided by ballot, and the performance order were reversed during the second round.

==== 1st round ====
After the first song, Yang was revealed to be temporarily leading the votes.

I Am a Singer Season 1 Revival Round 1 March 29, 2013 Host: Hu Haiquan
Order of Performance	Singer	Comedian Manager	Song Title	Original Singer	Lyrics	Composer	Arranger	Ranking
1	Paul Wong	Wayne Zhang	"特别的爱给特别的你"	Sky Wu	陳家麗	Sky Wu	Paul Wong	-
2	Shang Wenjie	Wu Xin	"Love Warrior戰" (English)	Shang Wenjie			Jean-Francois Maljean	-
3	Aska Yang	Tian Yuan	"流浪記"	Samingad	Panai		Kubert Leung	1
4	Chen Ming	Wang Qiao	"寂寞讓我如此美麗"	Chen Ming	妮南	劉彤	Kubert Leung	-
5	Sha Baoliang	YOYO	"最初的信仰"	Sha Baoliang	老沫 劉佳	劉佳	Kubert Leung	-

==== 2nd round ====
After combining the overall votes from the two songs, Yang was revealed to be the singer who received the highest number of votes, thus reinstating him from the competition and advanced to the semifinals. The placements for the other four singers were not revealed.

I Am a Singer Season 1 Revival Round 2 March 29, 2013 Host: Hu Haiquan
Order of Performance ^{[b]}	Singer	Comedian Manager	Song Title	Original Singer	Lyrics	Composer	Arranger	Ranking
1	Sha Baoliang	YOYO	"Someone Like You" (English)	Adele	Adele; Dan Wilson		Kubert Leung	— ^{[a]}
2	Chen Ming	Wang Qiao	"梨花又開放"	Jonathan Zhou	丁小齊	因幡晃	撈仔	—
3	Aska Yang	Tian Yuan	"饞"	Aska Yang	Jonathan Lee	Jonathan Lee 周國儀	Pyo Keun Soo	1 ^{[b]}
4	Shang Wenjie	Wu Xin	"我"	Leslie Cheung	Lin Xi	Leslie Cheung	Kubert Leung	— ^{[c}
5	Paul Wong	Wayne Zhang	"我就是這樣的"	Paul Wong				—

A. Voted 1st in the 40s and 50s age group
B. Voted 1st in the Professional jury, the 10s and 20s age group.
C. Voted 1st in the Singer vote and the 30s age group.

=== Semifinals ===
- Taping Date: March 28, 2013
- Airdate: April 5, 2013

The Semifinals carries a 40% weightage in the final round, and each audience member could now cast one vote each, down from the usual three.

I Am a Singer Season 1 Semifinals April 5, 2013 Host: Hu Haiquan
Order of Performance	Singer	Comedian Manager	Song Title	Original Singer	Lyrics	Composer	Arranger	Ranking
1	Zhou Xiao'ou	Shen Ling	"流星無悔"	Zhou Xiao'ou	梁茫	Elton John	欒樹 張張	5 ^{[a]}
2	Huang Qishan	Du Haito	"一样的月光"	Angel Lee; Su Rui	Wu Nien Jen; Lo Ta Yu	Lee Shou-chuan	Pyo Keun Soo	6
3	Julia Peng	Xiao Yanzi	"One Moment in Time" (English)	Whitney Houston	Albert Hammond	John Bettis	Kubert Leung	4
4	Terry Lin	Shen Mengchen	"斷了線"	Mindy Quah	Chris Babida	樓南蔚	Kubert Leung 薛位山	2 ^{[b]}
4	Terry Lin	Shen Mengchen	"回家"	Shunza			Kubert Leung 薛位山	2 ^{[b]}
5	Winnie Hsin	KK	"Memory" (English)	Barbra Streisand	Trevor Nunn	Andrew Lloyd Webber	Kubert Leung	7
6	Yu Quan	Li Weijia	"大地"	Beyond	Lau Cheuk Fai	Wong Ka Kui	Kamada Toshiya; CHOKKAKU	3
7	Aska Yang	Tian Yuan	"最爱"	Michelle Pan	鍾曉陽; Cheng Kwok Kong	Jonathan Lee	Kubert Leung	1

A. 3 vote difference with 6th place singer.
B. 1 vote difference with 3rd place singer.

=== Grand finals ===
- Airdate: April 12, 2013

The Grand Finals consist of two rounds, with the first song being a duet with a guest singer, and the second song being a solo encore performance. The weightages for both rounds were 30% and 30%, respectively; the contestant who received a higher combined total (both the semi-finals and grand finals) was crowned as the overall winner.

==== Non-competition performances ====
I Am a Singer Season 1 Grand Finals (Return Performances, Guest Performance) April 12, 2013 Host: Sha Baoliang, He Jiong, Wang Han
Order of Performance	Singer	Comedian Manager	Song Title	Original Singer	Lyrics	Composer	Arranger	Ranking
1	Paul Wong	Wayne Zhang	"龙的传人"	Li Jian Fu	Hou Dejian		Paul Wong	Return Performance
2	Chen Ming	Wang Qiao	"闷"	Sandy Lam	Yao chien	Robbie Williams; Guy Chambers Bennett	Kubert Leung	Return Performance
3	Shang Wenjie	Wu Xin	"Bored"	Faye Wong	Lin Xi	Zhang Yadong	Kubert Leung	Return Performance
4	Sha Baoliang	YOYO	"十年"	Eason Chan	Lin Xi	陳小霞	Kubert Leung	Return Performance
5	Chyi Chin; Chyi Yu	Li Rui	"梦田"	Chyi Yu; Michelle Pan	Sanmao	翁孝良	Kubert Leung	Return Performance, Guest Performance

==== First round: guest duets ====
The order of performance of this round were based on their rankings from the semi-finals, starting with the singer who ranked first.

I Am a Singer Season 1 Grand Finals Round 1 April 12, 2013 Host: He Jiong, Wang Han
Order of Performance	Singer	Comedian Manager	Help Singer	Song Title	Original Singer	Lyrics	Composer	Arranger	Ranking
1	Zhou Xiao'ou	Shen Ling	Sitar Tan	"天下沒有不散的筵席" (Mandarin)	Zheng Jun			欒樹 張張	7
2	Winnie Hsin	KK	Wakin Chau	"当爱已成往事"	Jonathan Lee; Sandy Lam	Jonathan Lee		Koji Sakurai	6
3	Huang Qishan	Du Haitao	The One	"Without You" (English)	Badfinger; Mariah Carey	Pete Ham; Tom Evans		Pyo Keun Soo	3 (Tie)
4	Julia Peng	Xiao Yanzi	Shunza	"酒干倘卖无"	Su Rui	Lo Ta-yu; Hou Dejian	Hou Dejian	Yao Hung; Hong Xinjie	5
4	Julia Peng	Xiao Yanzi	Shunza	"一无所有"	Cui Jian			Yao Hung; Hong Xinjie	5
5	Yu Quan	Li Weijia	Deng Chao	"奔跑"	Yu Quan			Yu Quan; Liu Zhuo	1
5	Yu Quan	Li Weijia	Deng Chao	"冷酷到底" (Mandarin)	Yu Quan			Yu Quan; Liu Zhuo	1
6	Terry Lin	Shen Mengchen	Jam Hsiao	"Easy Lover" (English)	Phil Collins; Philip Bailey	Philip Bailey; Phil Collins; Nathan East		Kubert Leung; Phil Collins	2
7	Aska Yang	Tian Yuan	James Li	"我要我們在一起"	Mavis Fan	James Li		Kubert Leung	3 (Tie)

==== Second round: winner's song ====
The order of performance of this round were based on their rankings from the first song, starting with the singer who ranked last place; if tied, the singer with a higher ranking from the semifinals will perform first.

I Am a Singer Season 1 Grand Finals Round 2 April 12, 2013 Host: He Jiong, Wang Han
Order of Performance	Singer	Comedian Manager	Song Title	Original Singer	Lyrics	Composer	Arranger	Final Results
1	Zhou Xiao'ou	Shen Ling	"Everything I Do" (English)	Bryan Adams	Bryan Adams; Michael Kamen; Robert John "Mutt" Lange		欒樹; Zhang Zhang	—
2	Winnie Hsin	KK	"味道"	Winnie Hsin	Yao chien	Huang Kuo Lun	Kubert Leung	—
3	Julia Peng	Xiao Yanzi	"相见恨晚"	Julia Peng	Wawa	Chen Kuo Hua	Kubert Leung	—
4	Aska Yang	Tian Yuan	"我離開我自己"	Faith Yang	Kwan	Diane Chen	王文穎	—
5	Huang Qishan	Du Haitao	"只有你"	Huang Qishan	馮銳	張宏光	Liu Zhuo	3
6	Terry Lin	Shen Mengchen	"浮夸" (Mandarin)	Terry Lin	樓南蔚	C.Y.Kong	薛位山	2
7	Yu Quan	Li Weijia	"给所有知道我名字的人"	Chao Chuan	Jonathan Lee	Liu Tianjian	Kamada Toshiya; Munakata Hitoshi	1

===== Winner of battle =====
Before the final results were announced, the host named Lin and Yu Quan as the "ultimate winner candidates". Yu Quan was declared the first-ever I Am a Singer winner with 25.78% of the combined total, beating Lin's combined total of 22.59%.

I Am a Singer Season 1 Winner of Battle
Ranking	Singer	Semi-finals Percentages of Votes (40%)	Grand Finals Round 1 Percentages of Votes (30%)	Grand Finals Round 2 Percentages of Votes (30%)	Total Percentages of Votes
1	Yu Quan	17.24%	28.60%	34.38%	25.78%
2	Terry Lin	17.44%	15.60%	36.47%	22.59%
