= Come Sing with Me =

Chinese variety music show

- Title card
- Chinese: 我想和你唱
- Hanyu Pinyin: Wǒ Xiǎng Hé Nǐ Chàng
- Genre: Variety show
- Directed by: Wang Qin
- Presented by: Wang Han; Han Hong
- Country of origin: China
- Original language: Mandarin
- No. of seasons: 3
- No. of episodes: 35

Production
- Producer: Lu Huanbin
- Production locations: Changsha, Hunan, China
- Camera setup: Multi-camera
- Running time: 90 minutes
- Production company: HBS

Original release
- Network: Hunan Television
- Release: 7 May 2016 – 13 July 2018

Come Sing with Me (Chinese: 我想和你唱; pinyin: Wǒ Xiǎng Hé Nǐ Chàng) is a Chinese variety music show, broadcast on Hunan Television. The show is hosted by Wang Han and the singer Han Hong, which invites exceptional renowned singers and ordinary people like fans. Every episode takes about 90 minutes to broadcast. The program's first season has 11 episodes, released on 7 May 2016, while the second season has 12 episodes and released on 29 April 2017. Mandopop folk singer Fei Yu-ching was the host of the final episode of the first season. Come Sing With Me ranked second in the Top 10 Popular China TV Shows in the first half of the year 2016.

The music party show was manufactured and directed by Wang Qin and their team, which was the main program show of Super Girl, Super Boy and Tian Sheng Yi Dui (天声一队) executive producer. The music show was exclusively recorded, copyrighted from KuGou, NetEase Music, and broadened by Mango Television.

== Competition rules ==
There would be three renowned singers to upload and levy their video for chorus every week of episodes. The audience could participate in the chorus on video via Mango TV and Changba, and could apply online in the platform to participate.

In the first season, the program organizers would inform every renowned singer to choose six persons to arrive at the live party. Those six participators' results on the video to get approval points were score in front of three persons, who would have the opportunity to attend the live competition and chorus with their idols. Renown singers would choose one person to deed as their partnership in the party for the chorus. Every week of episodes, the live party would also appraise the most reception of Hi sing intelligent persons in grassroots and award the music rewards to those participators.

In the second season, the program organizers would inform three renowned singers to choose 100 persons to arrive at the live party. The stage is also prepared and set up a particular area for them. Those one hundred Hi Sing participators conduct as part of the campaign group and interact with their idols at any time. Simultaneously, to coordinate the Hi Sing participators' arrival, program mode has also conducted a new entirely upgrade. They canceled the first season's original 6 in 3 competition rules, supersede from hundred persons interactive, and afterward announce three persons to enter the first round of chorus followed by 3 in 1 of the chorus. Renowned singers from 3 will choose 1 and 1 in 1 partnership chorus. The certain part of competition rules from the first season has remained the same and appraising the most reception of Hi Sing intelligent persons in grassroots part has also been canceled. Every week the live party would set a group of 5 to 6 persons and let renowned singers choose a chorus partner.

== List of episodes ==
Note: The red color lists indicate the video that will get approval points and was scored in front of 3 persons and enter the first round of the live chorus. Named in green color indicates the person gets elected by renown singers to perform singing in partnership and enter the second round of the live chorus, and the yellow columns which indicate the singers and participators at most reception of Hi Sing in grassroots.

=== Season 1 ===
==== Episode 1 ====
Come Sing with Me Season 1 Episode 1 May 7, 2016 Hosts: Wang Han, Han Hong; Members of the judge group: Li Weijia, Jeffrey G, Yu Shasha, Jerry Yuan, Julius Liu, Phoebe Huang
Order of Performance	Singer	Participants	First Song Title	Second Song Title
1.	Joey Yung	Zhang Yiteng, Huang Lin, Liang Xibin, Lan Zilong, Huang Xingheng, Di Di	"Lonely Portrait"	"Girl Fluttering Her Wings"
2.	David Tao	Liu Yiru, Zhu Haoren, Yuan Kai, Xu Fu, Chen Huihui, Guan Shipeng	"Rain"	"I Love You"
3.	Phoenix Legend	Zhang Lu, Liu Jialiang, Li Yanqia & Liu Yang, Li Minglin, Dong Xue with her family, Wang Bo	"The Most Dazzling Folk Style"	"Above the Moon"
4.^{[a]}	Han Hong	Guest performance	"Vast Sky, Great Love"	
5.^{[a]}	Coco Lee	Guest performance	"Di Da Di"	

A. Broadcast at the end of the programme

==== Episode 2 ====
Come Sing with Me Season 1 Episode 2 May 14, 2016 Hosts: Wang Han, Han Hong; Members of the judge group: Li Weijia, Alan Yu, Yu Shasha, Phoebe Huang, Jeffrey G
Order of Performance	Singer	Participants	First Song Title	Second Song Title
1.^{[a]}	Yu Quan	Nie Shi & Qi Junyu, Gao Zhenming & Sun Haoran, Wang Wenxin, Sui Yi & Liu Yuning, Chen Huan, Hua Xiansheng	"Run Run Run"	"Rainbow"
2.^{[b]}	A-Lin	Chen Jiaxin, Huang Xiaoyao, Li Lintao, Zeng Linchen, Wu Yizhou, Zheng Yan	"Give Me A Reason to Forget"	"Lovelorn, Not Guilty"
3.	Jam Hsiao	Chen Huijuan, Gao Hongtao, Song Enzhi, Liu Jia, Cai Rui, Jing Jie	"Princess"	"How to Say I Don't Love You"

A. The order of performance is No.2 in second round
B. The order of performance is No.1 in second round

==== Episode 3 ====
Come Sing with Me Season 1 Episode 3 May 21, 2016 Hosts: Wang Han, Han Hong; Members of the judge group: Li Weijia, Yu Shasha, Phoebe Huang, Jeffrey G, Julius Liu
Order of Performance	Singer	Participants	First Song Title	Second Song Title
1.	Aska Yang	Ding Funi, Hong Jianyi, Wang Xiqiao, Deng Lei, Wang Xinxin, Xi Se	"Empty Space"	"Just One Time"
2.	Xiaoshenyang	Fan Shuming, Qiang Dongyue, Zhao Qingwang, Du Ronghuan, Xiao Wen, Yang Xiaodong	"I'm Just a Legend"	"Just Call Me Nobody"
3.	Huang Qishan	Weaw, Shen Hongmei, Jin Renxin, Sun Mingyang, Yan Yucheng, Zhu Hongjian	"Await"	"Can't Leave You"

==== Episode 4 ====
Come Sing with Me Season 1 Episode 4 May 28, 2016 Hosts: Wang Han, Han Hong; Members of the judge group: Li Weijia, Yu Shasha, Phoebe Huang, Jeffrey G, Julius Liu
Order of Performance	Singer	Participants	First Song Title	Second Song Title
1.	Yang Yuying	Cui Cui, Shi Jiake, Wang Tianyi, Hu Yixin, You You with her dad, Tu Xiaoling	"Tea Mountain Love Song"	"Gently Tell You"
2.	Good Sister Band	Zheng Yajuan, Qian Dele, Ma Li, Xiang Yang, Wang Ziyun, Li Shanyuan	"The Past Can Only Be Reminisced"	"Fly to the Other End of the City"
3.	Leo Ku	Tong Xiaolu, Mei Chen, An Zhenhui, Wang Xiaohu, Su Sirong, Chen Jiajie	"Miss You"	"Medley of Love Songs"

==== Episode 5 ====
Come Sing with Me Season 1 Episode 5 June 4, 2016 Hosts: Wang Han, Han Hong; Members of the judge group: Li Weijia, Yu Shasha, Phoebe Huang, Jeffrey G, Julius Liu
Order of Performance	Singer	Participants	First Song Title	Second Song Title
1.	Shin	He Xi, Zhang Yuxuan, Piao Huizi, Li Huize, Wu Yuyu, Li Siyin	"Even in Death I'll Love"	"Burning Loneliness"
2.	Tiger Huang	Dou Xiaomen, Liu Shuhan, Lv Binghan, Liu Lanqing, Du Mingya, Ge Shuangxi	"Historia De Un Amor"	"Not So Simple"
3.	Han Hong	Zhang Huahua, Zhang Qi, Mr. and Mrs. Liao, Deng Xiaokun, An Ze, Xu Jing	"The Sea"	"One Person"

==== Episode 6 ====
Come Sing with Me Season 1 Episode 6 June 11, 2016 Hosts: Wang Han, Han Hong; Members of the judge group: Li Weijia, Yu Shasha, Phoebe Huang, Jeffrey G, Julius Liu
Order of Performance	Singer	Participants	First Song Title	Second Song Title
1.	Isabelle Huang	Niu Miaomiao, Li Bo, Huo Shang, Chen Xi, Zhu Zizheng & Zhu Zishuai, Zhang Wei	"High Song"	"Rose, Rose, I Love You"
2.	Terry Lin	Peng Feixiao, Yang Haifeng, Gao Linhan, Wu Yingxiang, Liang Jiacheng, Zhang Liang	"Single Love Song"	"I Surrender"
3.	Hacken Lee	Xie Yongxi, Wang Mingyan, Zhong Le, Li Bingxi, Shi Yan, Wing Lo	"Blazing Sun" (Cantonese)	"The Crescent Moon" (Cantonese) "Your Shining Knight" (Cantonese)

==== Episode 7 ====
Come Sing with Me Season 1 Episode 7 June 18, 2016 Hosts: Wang Han, Han Hong; Members of the judge group: Li Weijia, Yu Shasha, Leo Li, Phoebe Huang, Jeffrey G, Julius Liu
Order of Performance	Singer	Participants	First Song Title	Second Song Title
1.	Angela Chang	Zhang Shanshan, Kong Shuang, Yang Xizi, Yu Wei & Yu Xin, Zhu Qiusha & Tian Daling, A family of He Siyu	"Aurora"	"Keep Walking in the Rain" "Invisible Wings"
2.	Fei Yu-ching	Li Xue, Liu Yang, Hong Mei, Huang Xiao, Han Jinan, Ji Pengfei	"A Piece of Plum"	"A Long Distance Away"
3.	Bibi Zhou	Yu Shu, Yang Hao, Tian Junhang, Zhang Zhe, Zhang Huizi, Ma You	"Quarreling"	"Talk About Love"

==== Episode 8 ====
Come Sing with Me Season 1 Episode 8 June 25, 2016 Hosts: Wang Han, Han Hong; Members of the judge group: Li Weijia, Yu Shasha, Phoebe Huang, Jeffrey G, Julius Liu, Ma Ke
Order of Performance	Singer	Participants	First Song Title	Second Song Title
1.	Gary Chaw	Chen Xinzhe, Tara, Chen Chen, Hong Xixi, Wei Yuanjun, Yan Jiaen	"Liang Shanbo and Juliet"	"Betray"
2.	Michael Wong	Ji Quanzhi, Yi Hao, Zhang Chaowei, Cao Yu, Wang Laxue, Hao Jianzhong & Liu Jiawei	"Child's Fairy Tale"	"The First Time"
3.	Richie Jen	Liu Luhui, Yu Changbo, A family of Liu Yuxiang, Lu Koukou, Jin Zhi, The group of Xuan Sheng	"Your Heart Is Too Lithe"	"The Border of Heaven"

==== Episode 9 ====
Come Sing with Me Season 1 Episode 9 July 2, 2016 Hosts: Wang Han, Han Hong; Members of the judge group: Yu Shasha, Leo Li, Phoebe Huang, Jeffrey G, Julius Liu
Order of Performance	Singer	Participants	First Song Title	Second Song Title
1.	Wowkie Zhang	A group of Anonymous, YOUNG-G, Hu Haiyan, Li Jianuo, Lin Yahui, Tuo Tingting	"Times to Let You Cool"	"Sparkling Red Star" "Happiness in Poverty" "Joy for Juggling"
2.	Lala Hsu	Zhang Wanyi, Liu Heng, Chen Yinling, Lan Hailong, Liu Jia, Sisters Pan	"Riding on a White Horse"	"Lost Desert"
3.	Joker Xue	Huang Yunlong, Tong Yingran, Zhang Wanqing, Guo Lei, Huang Xiaoen, Wang Linglu	"Very Ugly Person"	"The Performer"

==== Episode 10 ====
Come Sing with Me Season 1 Episode 10 July 9, 2016 Hosts: Wang Han, Han Hong; Members of the judge group: Li Weijia, Yu Shasha, Leo Li, Phoebe Huang, Jeffrey G, Julius Liu
Order of Performance	Singer	Participants	First Song Title	Second Song Title
1.	Kenji Wu	Tuo Xie, Sing, Ma Shangen, Fu Min, Bai Jin, Ye Xiaoyue	"Army General Order"	"Writing an Poem for You"
2.	Winnie Hsin	Chen Jia, Fu Ying, Meng Huiyuan, Ma Xiu, Ren Yingying, Xie Jiaxi	"The Taste"	"To Realize"
3.	Jason Zhang	Liu Zhenyu, Zhou Yihao, Huang Zonghui, Li Xuqing, Ma Long, Ye Cheng	"Assault Fire"	"This Is Love"
4.	Han Hong	Leaving performance	"Forever Separated By Water From A River"	

==== Episode 11 ====
Come Sing with Me Season 1 Episode 11 July 16, 2016 Hosts: Wang Han, Fei Yu-ching; Members of the judge group: Li Weijia, Yu Shasha, Leo Li, Phoebe Huang, Jeffrey G, Julius Liu
Order of Performance	Singer	Participants	First Song Title	Second Song Title
OP	Participators of the previous 10 episodes		"Come Sing With Me"	
1.	Jeff Chang	Aodeng Gaowa, Fan Bo, Zhou Xuefeng, Qi Zheng, Sun Luying, Wu Xiaohui	"Love Is Like a Tide"	"Believe in Faith"
2.	Elva Hsiao	WalkingXL band, A Yunga, Notice of boys group, Tang Hongli, Yang Xuanqi, Yin Guohui	"Nuttiness Miss"	"The Most Familiar of Stranger"
3.	Han Lei	Pan Qianqian, Zhang Yue, Zhao Jinjiang, Hu Min, Liu Yueqi, Zhang Junli	"Awaiting"	"On This Moment"

=== Season 2 ===
==== Episode 1 ====
Come Sing with Me Season 2 Episode 1 April 29, 2017 Hosts: Wang Han, Han Hong; Members of the judge group: Yu Meiren, Yu Shasha, Kim Ji-mun, Huang Xiao, Since Xie, Nancy Kou
Order of Performance	Singer	Participants	First Song Title	Second Song Title
OP	Wang Han, Han Hong, Yu Meiren, Yu Shasha, Kim Ji-mun, Huang Xiao, Since Xie, Nancy Kou		"Come Sing with Me"	
1.	Alan Tam	5 engulfed tigers, Mu Sen, 3 southern uncle, Wang Weidong	"Friend" (Cantonese)	"Unable to Say Goodbye" (Cantonese)
2.	Cai Guoqing	Wang Yunfeng Cai Qun, Wang Wanchen, Li Xingchen, SWIN group Not on stage interaction: Liu Peng (Time to vindicate)	"365 of Bless"	"Listen My Mum Said That Past Affair" "Wind Waves the Wheat"
3.	Stefanie Sun	Ma Jia, A family of Fu Xia, Yan Ling & Yan Li, Liu Shuo, Zhang Xiaoqing; Not on stage interaction: Zhang Ermao (Time to vindicate)	"The Mysterious"	"Half a Goodbye"

==== Episode 2 ====
Come Sing with Me Season 2 Episode 2 May 6, 2017 Hosts: Wang Han, Han Hong; Members of the judge group: Li Weijia, Yu Shasha, Lidia Liu, Nancy Kou, Aray Aydarhan, Kim Ji-mun
Order of Performance	Singer	Participants	First Song Title	Second Song Title
1.	Sally Yeh	Ren Junhao, Ding Bizhou, Li Guoqing, Tao Sizhe, Huang Sican; Not on stage interaction: Zhang Yu (Time to vindicate)	"Walk Back in Nuttiness"	"The Choose"
2.	Tiger Hu	Gao Mou, Xue Mingyuan, Luoyang Yunzi, Angel Mo; Not on stage interaction: Geng Tingting (Time to vindicate)	"Red Color"	"Man KTV"
3.	Dimash Kudaibergen	Zhou Yi, Liu Lu, Chen Yanhong; Not on stage interaction: Kang Xiaodi (Time to vindicate), Kazakh & Chinese refer column (Time to vindicate)	"S.O.S. of an Earthling in Distress" (French)	"The Lately Autumn"

==== Episode 3 ====
Come Sing with Me Season 2 Episode 3 May 13, 2017 Hosts: Wang Han, Han Hong; Members of the judge group: Li Weijia, Yu Shasha, Lidia Liu, Nancy Kou, Kim Ji-mun
Order of Performance	Singer	Participants	First Song Title	Second Song Title
1.	Tanya Chua	Zhao Liang, Xiao Yuzi & Shen Shen, Su Biyi, Ya Sen	"Don't Find Me for Trouble"	"The Darwin"
2.	Chao Chuan	Zhang Xi, Zhou Jing, Chen Dongdong, Zhang Wenbin	"I'm Ugly but I'm Very Gentle"	"Must Bravely"
3.	Shang Wenjie	Alirie group, Mu Liyan, Zhang Gaoyuan, Yin Shengjie; Not on stage interaction: Luo Tianfeng (Time to vindicate)	"The Ultimate Faith"	"The Power of Time"

==== Episode 4 ====
Come Sing with Me Season 2 Episode 4 May 20, 2017 Hosts: Wang Han, Han Hong; Members of the judge group: Li Weijia, Yu Shasha, Oscar Qian, Phoebe Huang, Kim Ji-mun, Yang Di
Order of Performance	Singer	Participants	First Song Title	Second Song Title
OP	Li Weijia, Yu Shasha, Oscar Qian, Phoebe Huang, Kim Ji-mun, Yang Di		"I Love You"	
1.	Diamond Zhang	Zhou Chenliang & Zhou Qingquan, Long Ze, Chen Yifu; Not on stage interaction: Tang Qian (Time to vindicate), Aori Qileng	"So Cool"	"Annual Ring"
2.	FanFan	Yang Chen, Zhang Yunling, Gu Yixuan; Not on stage interaction: Kong Bo & Wang Fei (Time to vindicate), 3 African Brothers (Time to vindicate), Yang Chaoyi	"Initial Dream"	"The Most Important of Decision"
3.	Aska Yang	Yu Dongran, Yang Xu, Lin Feng; Not on stage interaction: Fan Jiajun (Time to vindicate)	"That's Nothing in Actually"	"The Rove Record"

==== Episode 5 ====
Come Sing with Me Season 2 Episode 5 May 27, 2017 Hosts: Wang Han, Han Hong; Members of the judge group: Li Weijia, Yu Shasha, Mandy Jin, Phoebe Huang, Kim Ji-mun, Yang Di
Order of Performance	Singer	Participants	First Song Title	Second Song Title
1.	Tia Ray	Bi Xiaoxin, Dong Jingqun, Sun Shoujing, Li Jinni	"The Different Like"	"A Girl of A-Chu"
2.	Gigi Leung	Lu Jiasi, Xu Zichao, Wang Sijia, Zhao Chongwei	"A Short Hair"	"Prejudice"
3.	Power Station	Din Georg, Yixi Yongcang, A group of Yimeng; Not on stage interaction: Fu Xiaomo	"While"	"Rainbow"

==== Episode 6 ====
Come Sing with Me Season 2 Episode 6 June 3, 2017 Hosts: Wang Han, Han Hong; Members of the judge group: Li Weijia, Yu Shasha, Oscar Qian, Phoebe Huang, Kim Ji-mun, Yu Meiren
Order of Performance	Singer	Participants	First Song Title	Second Song Title
1.	Miriam Yeung	Pan Yin, Zhou Yi, Wu Haoyu, Dong Jiahong; Not on stage interaction: Ye Xueru	"An Event at Big City"	"Unfortunately, I'm Aquarius" (Cantonese)
2.	Jeff Chang	Liu Qi, Yili Hamu, Yang Feifei, Chen Qin; Not on stage interaction: Shan Shuo (Time to vindicate)	"Too Much"	"An Plain Moonlight"
3.	Jane Zhang	Lu Changyu, Wang Yitao, Huang Shichun, Li Bingcheng, Zhang Yijia; Not on stage interaction: Yu Shanhong & Su Zishan & Zhang Xin (Time to vindicate)	"Painting Heart II"	"Finally Waited Until I've You"

==== Episode 7 ====
Come Sing with Me Season 2 Episode 7 June 10, 2017 Hosts: Wang Han, Han Hong; Members of the judge group: Li Weijia, Huang Feihong, Lidia Liu, Phoebe Huang, Kim Ji-mun, Yu Meiren
Order of Performance	Singer	Participants	First Song Title	Second Song Title
1.	Sitar Tan	Zezhou Siji, Zheng Haotian, Zhang Yujia; Not on stage interaction: Bu Xiaogang (Time to vindicate)	"If There Is a New Life"	"Blah Blah Blah"
2.	Liang Bo	Gao Yurong, Xiao Hedong, Tao Mengtong, Xu Suqin, Liu Lingmei	"A Boy"	"Changed"
3.	Julia Peng	Yu Qun, Shi Shuai, Zhao Youqiao, Guo Chen, Yu Chaoying; Not on stage interaction: Chen Zixu & Yang Luyuan (Time to vindicate)	"Walking in the Red Carpet on That Day"	"An Older Girl"

==== Episode 8 ====
Come Sing with Me Season 2 Episode 8 June 17, 2017 Hosts: Wang Han, Han Hong; Members of the judge group: Li Weijia, Yu Shasha, Lidia Liu, Nancy Kou, Kim Ji-mun, Mandy Jin
Order of Performance	Singer	Participants	First Song Title	Second Song Title
1.	Hua Chenyu	Su Han, Zhouxing Huayi, Li Ya, Xue Hua; Not on stage interaction: Wang Fei (Time to vindicate)	"I Don't Care + Aliens"	"Ashes in the Fireworks"
2.	Coco Lee	Zhang Zhi, Ding Shiyu, Liu Yixuan; Not on stage interaction: Xu Jihao (Time to vindicate)	"Di Da Di"	"The Moonlight Lover"
3.	Fei Yu-ching	Luo Jiajun, Sun Xinyu, Ling Guo, Wu Xiongcheng & Li Zijing	"Abandon Southern in the Late Time"	"Hai Hai Hai"

==== Episode 9 ====
Come Sing with Me Season 2 Episode 9 June 24, 2017 Hosts: Wang Han, Han Hong; Members of the judge group: Li Weijia, Yu Shasha, Lidia Liu, Nancy Kou, Kim Ji-mun, Mandy Jin
Order of Performance	Singer	Participants	First Song Title	Second Song Title
1.	Silence Wang	Lu Zetao, Ming Baichen & Ming Xiaoyan, Yang Zixin, Chen Moyi	"A Smile Allure"	"A Bit Sweet"
2.	Li Yugang	Xu Tianyi, Zhao Jiayi, Zhu Songhao, Yang Jiao; Not on stage interaction: Li Weijia (Time to vindicate), Geng Mingjing (Time to vindicate)	"Drunk of New Concubine"	"Just Met You"
3.	G.E.M.	Yu Saiya, Luo Ang, Dai siqi, Xiao Ming, Zhong Hao & Li Xia; Not on stage interaction: Yang Shuangyi (Time to vindicate)	"Foam"	"Light Years Away"

==== Episode 10 ====
Come Sing with Me Season 2 Episode 10 July 1, 2017 Hosts: Wang Han, Han Hong; Members of the judge group: Li Weijia, Yu Shasha, Lidia Liu, Phoebe Huang, Kim Ji-mun, Yang Di
Order of Performance	Singer	Participants	First Song Title	Second Song Title
1.	George Lam	Lin Zhicheng, Zheng Yueling & Deng Ziyang, Huang Jialing, Lin Kaixuan	"When the Man Is Strong"	"Dare to Love and Do It" (Cantonese)
2.	Julian Cheung	Luo Haidong, Lin Xiayu, Mai Beiyi; Not on stage interaction: Huang Jianting (Time to vindicate)	"Love Story in Modern Time" (Cantonese)	"Years of the Songs" (Cantonese)
3.	Han Lei	Wang Xiaoxiao, Sui Jichen, Li Xiaoxu, Xiao Yuxin; Not on stage interaction: Han Dong (Time to vindicate)	"Walk in Quartet"	"In Front of Blooming"

==== Episode 11 ====
Come Sing with Me Season 2 Episode 11 July 8, 2017 Hosts: Wang Han, Han Hong; Members of the judge group: Li Weijia, Yu Shasha, Lidia Liu, Nancy Kou, Kim Ji-mun, Yu Meiren
Order of Performance	Singer	Participants	First Song Title	Second Song Title
1.^{[a]}	Matilda Tao	Xinqi Group、Helen Zeng、F3 Flowers Boy Team, Supissara Jipata; Not on stage interaction: Supermodel Sisters Team (Time to vindicate)	"Sister And Sister Stand Up"	"Too Wronged"
2.^{[b]}	Lion	Yu Yuzhou、Liu Wenjun, Wu Mingheng; Not on stage interaction: Chen Jiabin (Time to vindicate)	"Lion"	"The Last Plea"
3.^{[c]}	Hu Xia	Xie Yaer、Wang Ruichao, Lin Yuncheng; Not on stage interaction: Sichuan University of Media and Communications Cheerleaders (Time to vindicate), Danny Koo	"Those Years"	"Love Xia"

A. The order of performance is No.2 in second round
B. The order of performance is No.3 in second round
C. The order of performance is No.1 in second round

==== Episode 12 ====
Come Sing with Me Season 2 Episode 12 July 15, 2017 Hosts: Wang Han, Han Hong; Members of the judge group: Li Weijia, Yu Shasha, Oscar Qian, Phoebe Huang, Kim Ji-mun, Yang Di, Yu Meiren
Order of Performance	Singer	Participants	First Song Title	Second Song Title
OP	Wang Han, Han Hong, Li Weijia, Yu Shasha, Oscar Qian, Phoebe Huang, Kim Ji-mun, Yang Di, Yu Meiren; Participators of the previous 11 episodes		"Come Sing With Me"	
1.	Karry Wang	Hu Hai, Cui Tan, Lin Kexin, Zhou Qian; Not on stage interaction: Guo Rong (Time to vindicate)	"Pamper"	"Reading Tree"
2.	Sandy Lam	Yang Qi, Xia Yao, Shi Miao & Yu Lutong; Not on stage interaction: Xiao Siqi (Time to vindicate)	"At Least I Still Have You"	"Suffer for You"
3.	Chris Lee	Peng Yachun, Liu Siliang, Zhou Junyi, Li Peiyu; Not on stage interaction: Deng Qiyou (Time to vindicate), Zhang Xue & Sun Lifeng (Time to vindicate)	"Let's Meet at the Next Crossing"	"Old If Not Wild"

=== Season 3 ===
==== Episode 1 ====
Come Sing with Me Season 3 Episode 1 April 28, 2018 Hosts: Wang Han, Han Hong; Members of the judge group: Li Weijia, Shen Mengchen, Kim Ji-mun, Silence Wang, Yang Di, Ran Gaoming, Ren Yinsong, Liu Yi
Singer	Participants	Song Title
Jolin Tsai	Mi Re, Zhang Dajie, Tang Qishan, Lan Xiya, Lang Dongzhe, Daniel Sher, Gong Yicheng, Su Zichen, Ayqiwar, Cheng Cheng, Han Zhongyu & Han Boyu, Zong Ming, Ai Depeng, Lin Sifan, Ban Ban, Ma Yuman & Phadin Perhat, Cai Dingkun＆Guo Guangzhi, Xiao Mai, Du Xinyan, Chen Jianji; Not on stage interaction: Sun Lingling, Hou Fang	“Dancing Diva” "Sun Will Never Set" "Marry Me Today" "Prague Square" "I"
Other performances: OP: "Dancing Diva" by Jolin Tsai & Han Hong; Karaoke: "Manual of Youth" by Jolin Tsai; "Magic" by Daniel Sher; "Price Tag" by Ayqiwar; "Take You on a Trip" by Lang Dongzhe; "Dancing Diva" by Gong Yicheng; "Onion" by Du Xinyan; "Thai Cha Cha" by Cai Dingkun & Guo Guangzhi

Episode 2

Come Sing with Me Season 3 Episode 2 May 4, 2018 Hosts: Wang Han, Han Hong; Members of the judge group: Li Weijia, Shen Mengchen, Kim Ji-mun, Silence Wang, Yang Di, Ran Gaoming, Ren Yinsong, Liu Yi
Singer	Participants	Song Title
Yuan Wang	Chen Pengxuan, Buqi Dance Troupe, Lin Yaxi, Li Guomiao, Mi Li, Chen Qitongtong, Li Keyi & Li Kexin, Xiaoyugan Group Qi Haoran & Zeng Weidi, Dai Xin, Tan Mingyue & Pan Yue & Lin Hao Mawei, Jiang Lichen, Ai YueKamei, Verisa, Wu Banana & ChenTaozi Guo Shibo, Huang Lingzhi, Li Fangqing	"Seventeen" (collection of chorus videos) "Our Time" (10-second chorus in the same frame) "Pride" (one-to-one dream chorus)
Other performances: OP: "Little Wife" by Yuan Wang & Han Hong; Karaoke: "We Are Different" by Yuan Wang; "Self" by Mi Li; "Flying Away" by Xiaoyugan Group; "The First Day" by Chen Pengxuan; "Alocasia Love" by Ma Wei; "I will Always Love You" by Verissa; "Longing For Glory" by Chen Qi

== Controversy ==
=== The single episode was enforcement to postpone for broadcasting. ===
According to the competition rules arrangement, after every guest ends the second round of the chorus, the live audience would have 10 seconds to give points to whoever deserves the performance. Every group performance by the most reception of Hi sing intelligent persons in grassroots will be decided that week on how many approval points they get. However, the competition quality was violated in SAPPRFT regarding the type of music competition program that management have stipulated, reported by competitor in first season on episode 5. It was enforce postponed for broadcasting until 10:30 p.m. in Beijing time. Hereafter, the program organize have made adjustments to the next show, but wouldn't broadcast the program, while approving points is still remain the same, only some competition quality elemental was removed. Because of this, the program was retrieval until 10:00 p.m. in Beijing time.

=== Political censorship ===
On 8 July 2017, singer Hu Xia performed the first original song title "Those Years," broadcast in episode 11 of the second season. However, as the songwriter "Giddens Ko" have involved "Taiwan independence activists" separatism in the past, song did not pass the censorship, The singer Hu Xia and participator fans on first round of 3 in 1 chorus, and the VCR chorus version was deleted entirely. The song was replaced as "Rush to the Dead Summer." The song title "Those Years," which Hu Xia and 3 Hi Sing participators performed on first round of 3 in 1 chorus that had been broadcast online at NetEase Music before, was also speedily deleted.

== Audience ratings ==
The audience ratings for this Chinese TV music show:

=== Season 1 ratings ===
China Mainland Hunan TV broadcast audience ratings
Episodes	Date broadcasting	CSM52 audience ratings	CSM52 sharing ranks	CSM52 rankings	CSM nationwide net audience ratings	CSM nationwide net sharing ranks	CSM nationwide net rankings	Remarks
1.	7 May 2016	1.406	6.97	3	1.14	7.94	1	
2.	14 May 2016	1.479	7.08	3	1.26	8.52	1	
3.	21 May 2016	1.64	8.13	2	1.35	8.92	1	Music Master Class ended in Beijing TV.
4.	28 May 2016	1.331	6.37	4	1.15	7.36	1	Lady Bees ended in Zhejiang TV. Crossover Singer I broadcast on Beijing TV.
5.	4 June 2016	1.197	7.96	4	0.92	8.58	1	Broadcast at 10:30 p.m. in Beijing time (See also the Controversy section level). AUV NANA ended in Dragon TV. Challenger Alliance II broadcast on Zhejiang TV at 9:10 p.m. in Beijing time.
6.	11 June 2016	0.956	5.03	6	0.72	5.29	1	Girls Fighting broadcast on Dragon TV. Law of the Jungle broadcast on Anhui TV.
7.	18 June 2016	1.360	6.59	3	1.22	7.81	1	Familiar Taste broadcast on Zhejiang TV, Challenger Alliance II had move forward to broadcast at 8:30 p.m. in Beijing time.
8.	25 June 2016	1.366	6.29	4	1.27	7.82	1	
9.	2 July 2016	1.689	8.13	3	1.43	8.69	1	
10.	9 July 2016	1.371	7.15	4	1.41	9.31	1	
11.	16 July 2016	1.489	7.75	3	1.18	7.86	1	

1. At the same time or crossed time on the main program shows:
  - Zhejiang TV: Lady Bees / Challenger Alliance II / Familiar Taste
  - Jiangsu TV: If You Are the One
  - Dragon TV: AUV NANA / Girls Fighting
  - Anhui TV: Law of the Jungle
  - Beijing TV: Music Master Class / Crossover Singer I
2. Data are provided from CSM Media Research, the survey range was on ages of 4 years-old above.
3. The above on audience ratings are not included in China Central Television.
4. Source: These things on TV, Small exposed electricity on TV, Xiaoxiang Wolong, Hunan TV official WeChat (ID: happychina1997).
5. Ranking for all the variety shows on Saturday night, not necessarily as the same period on time.

=== Season 2 ratings ===
China Mainland Hunan TV broadcast audience ratings
Episodes	Date broadcasting	CSM52 audience ratings	CSM52 sharing ranks	CSM52 rankings	CSM nationwide net audience ratings	CSM nationwide net sharing ranks	CSM nationwide net rankings	Remarks
1.	29 April 2017	1.029	6.03	6	0.83	5.88	1	
2.	6 May 2017	1.201	7.05	6	0.9	6.61	1	
3.	13 May 2017	0.828	4.86	8	0.7	4.86	1	
4.	20 May 2017	1.128	6.55	6	0.97	6.69	1	
5.	27 May 2017	0.979	5.73	6	0.86	5.66	1	
6.	3 June 2017	1.003	5.68	6	0.78	5.41	1	Flowers On Trip broadcast on Dragon TV.
7.	10 June 2017	0.980	5.55	6	0.8	5.6	1	Burn U5 broadcast on Zhejiang TV had pause, changed to OPPO Electronics mid-year cum celebration R11 conference in contemporary (broadcast at 20:30).
8.	17 June 2017	1.054	6.03	6	0.84	5.79	1	Burn U5 broadcast on Zhejiang TV had resume.
9.	24 June 2017	1.288	7.22	5	1.23	8.28	1	Burn U5 ended in Zhejiang TV.
10.	1 July 2017	1.190	7.02	3	0.98	6.95	1	Challenger Alliance III broadcast on Zhejiang TV. Flowers On Trip broadcast on Dragon TV had pause, changed to The green onions start again - Hong Kong returned back to China 20th anniversary celebration specialized program show.
11.	8 July 2017	0.927	5.23	7	0.98	6.68	1	Crossover Singer II ended in Beijing TV. Flowers On Trip broadcast on Dragon TV had resume.
12.	15 July 2017	1.262	8.13	3	1.24	9.43	1	

1. At the same time or crossed time on the main program shows:
  - Zhejiang TV: Burn U5 / OPPO Electronics mid-year cum celebration R11 conference / Challenger Alliance III
  - Jiangsu TV: If You Are the One
  - Dragon TV: Flowers On Trip / The green onions start again - Hong Kong returned back to China 20th anniversary celebration specialized program show
  - Beijing TV: Crossover Singer II
2. Data are provided from CSM Media Research, the survey range was on ages of 4 years-old above.
3. The above on audience ratings are not included in China Central Television.
4. Source: These things on TV, Small exposed electricity on TV, Xiaoxiang Wolong, Hunan TV official WeChat (ID: happychina1997).
5. Ranking for all the variety shows on Saturday night, not necessarily as the same period on time.

=== Season 3 ratings ===
China Mainland Hunan TV broadcast audience ratings
Episodes	Date broadcasting	CSM52 audience ratings	CSM52 sharing ranks	CSM52 rankings	CSM nationwide net audience ratings	CSM nationwide net sharing ranks	CSM nationwide net rankings	Remarks
1.	28 April 2018	1.116	4.06	2	1.18	4.24	1	Broadcast at 8:20 p.m. on Saturday in Beijing time due to special circumstance.
2.	4 May 2018	0.816	2.95	4	1.02	3.72	2	
3.	11 May 2018	0.823	3.02	4	0.93	3.5	2	
4.	18 May 2018	0.744	2.82	5	0.83	3.21	2	
5.	25 May 2018	0.848	3.23	4	1.0	3.74	2	
6.	1 June 2018	0.713	2.67	4	0.86	3..27	2	
7.	8 June 2018	0.686	2.57	5	1.02	3.77	2	
8.	15 June 2018	0.597	2.09	6	1.03	3.69	2	
9.	22 June 2018	0.711	2.39	6	1.06	3.86	1	
10.	29 June 2018	0.865	3.24	4	0.99	3.89	2	
11.	6 July 2018	0.824	3.03	3	1.05	4.04	1	
12.	13 July 2018	0.906	3.35	4	1.14	4.41	1	

1. At the same time or crossed time on the main program shows:
  - Zhejiang TV: Keep Running
2. Data are provided from CSM Media Research, the survey range was on ages of 4 years-old above.
3. The above on audience ratings are not included in China Central Television.
4. Source: These things on TV, Small exposed electricity on TV, Xiaoxiang Wolong, Hunan TV official WeChat (ID: happychina1997).
5. Ranking for all the variety shows on Saturday night, not necessarily as the same period on time.

== Awards and nominations ==
Year	Award	Category	Nomination	Result
2017	23rd Shanghai Television Festival Magnolia Awards	Best Quarterly TV Program Award	"Come Sing with Me" Season 1	Nominated
