= Yu Shasha =

Chinese actress and host

- Born: 于莎莎; May 30, 1985 (age 40); Yantai, Shandong, China
- Occupations: Actress, host
- Years active: 2003–Present

Chinese name
- Chinese: 于莎莎
Transcriptions
Standard Mandarin
- Hanyu Pinyin: Yú Shā Shā

Yu Shasha (Chinese: 于莎莎; pinyin: Yú Shā Shā, born on 30 May 1985 in Yantai, Shandong, China), is a Chinese actress and host. She had graduation of higher vocational performance at Beijing Film Academy in the year 2003, after debutante on her career.

== Career and achievements ==
Yu have certain plenty experience in acting and some experience in hosting television shows. She and Shen Ling was jointly hosted at the second season of A Bright World (世界青年说) which the Chinese talk show based on popular South Korean talk show Non-Summit in year 2016 that invites those foreigners are living and studying in China as holding discussions in Standard Chinese on various topics and issues, talk show in Informal Talks (非正式会谈) as secretary general at second season in certain episodes and Nic Li jointly hosted in Lip Sync Battle (对口型大作战). She also invited to be guest at members of the judge group on variety music show Come Sing with Me in 2016 - 2017, Yu had won the most inspirational artist of BQ celebrity score awards in 2013 and nominee the best actress at web series of golden guduo media awards in 2016.

== Filmography ==
=== TV Series ===
Year	Title	Chinese title	Role as
2010	Bao Sangu Biography	《包三姑外传》	Er Pilian
2011	Hello Summer	《夏日甜心》	Summer
2011	Crazy Office	《疯狂办公室》	Ouyang Jingqiu
2011	Seven Weapons	《七种武器》	Shuang Shuang
2012	Diors Man	《屌丝男士》	Da Peng's girlfriend
2013	Puberty Run into Menopause II	《青春期撞上更年期II》	Liu Hong
2013	Love's Relativity	《爱的相对论》	Honeysuckle
2013	Love is not Blind	《失恋33天》	Qing Qing
2013	Ex (Wonder Lady)	《我的极品是前任》（极品女士）	Main actress
2013	Diors Man II	《屌丝男士第二季》	Da Peng's girlfriend
2013	Wonder Lady II	《极品女士第二季》	Main actress
2014	Diors Man III	《屌丝男士第三季》	Da Peng's girlfriend
2014	Wonder Lady III	《极品女士第三季》	Wonder Lady
2015	Diors Man 4	《屌丝男士第四季》	Da Peng's girlfriend
2015	Wonder Lady 4	《极品女士第四季》	Wonder Lady
2015	The Imperial Doctress	《女医·明妃传》	Zi Su

=== Movies ===
Year	Title	Chinese title	Role as
2008	Happy Contract	《幸福合同》	News reporter
2009	Gasp	《气喘吁吁》	News anchorwoman
2013	Love Speaks	《意外的恋爱时光》	Li Xiaoling
2016	When Larry Met Mary	《陆垚知马俐》	Guest actress
2017	For Money	《极速钱进》	
2017	Trouble Makers	《兄弟,别闹!》	
2017	Kill Me Please	《这就是命》	Yang Xiaonan
2018	Miss Puff	《泡芙小姐》	
2019	Change of Gangster	《转型团伙》	

=== TV shows ===
Year	Title	Chinese title	Role as
2013	Generation show	《年代秀》	Guest
2015	Informal Talks	《非正式会谈》	Past host
2015	Kitchen's Secrets	《厨房的秘密》	Guest
2016	Lip Sync Battle	《对口型大作战》	Host
2016	Come Sing with Me	《我想和你唱》	Guest
2016	Challenger Alliance II	《挑战者联盟第二季》	Guest
2016	A Bright World II	《世界青年说第二季》	Host
2017	Happy Comedian III	《欢乐喜剧人第三季》	Guest
2019	Dream Space	《恋梦空间》	Guest
