= Han Hong (singer) =

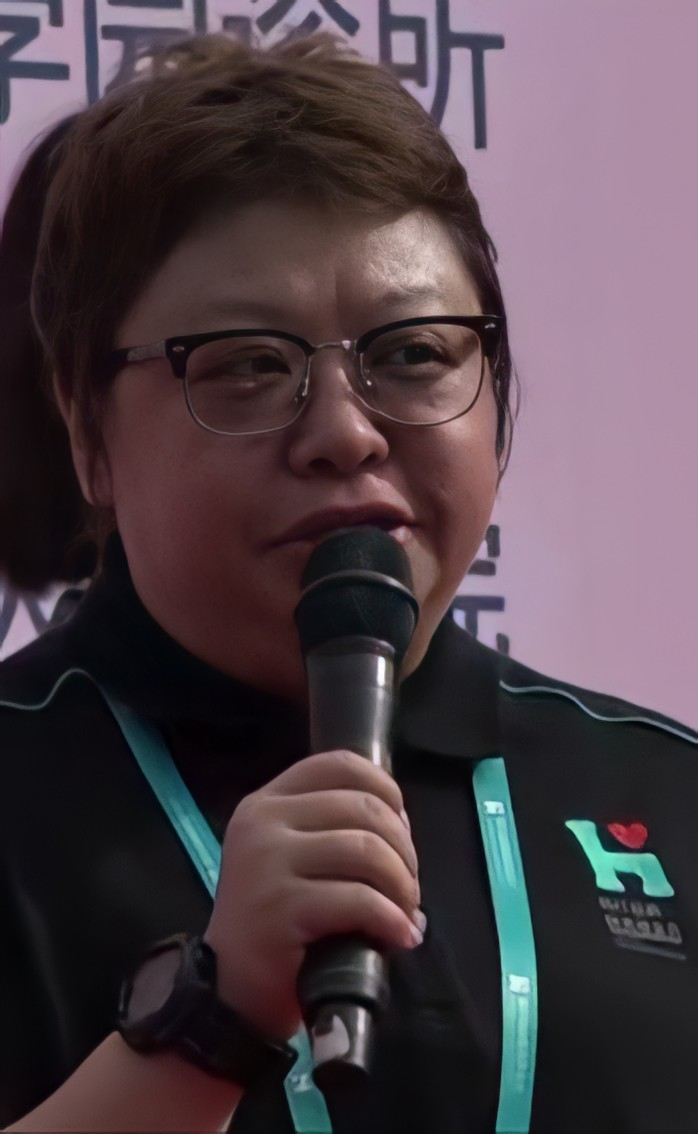
- Born: Yangjain Zhoima; 26 September 1971 (age 54); Chamdo County, Chamdo, Tibet, China
- Occupations: Philanthropist; Singer
- Years active: 1993–Present
- Children: Pan Zihao
- Parents: Han Baolai (father); Yong Xi (mother)

Chinese name
- Traditional Chinese: 韓紅
- Simplified Chinese: 韩红
Transcriptions
Standard Mandarin
- Hanyu Pinyin: Hán Hóng
- Musical career
- Genres: Mandopop
- Instrument: Vocals

Han Hong (simplified Chinese: 韩红; traditional Chinese: 韓紅; pinyin: Hán Hóng; Tibetan name Yangchen Drolma or Yangjain Zhoima དབྱངས་ཅན་སྒྲོལ་མ་, simplified Chinese: 央金卓玛; traditional Chinese: 央金卓瑪; pinyin: Yāngjīn Zhuōmǎ; born 26 September 1971 in Chamdo) is a Chinese singer, songwriter and philanthropist of mixed Tibetan and Han ethnicity. Han is one of the best known Chinese folk singers, incorporating elements of Tibetan music, Jazz, R-n-B, Rock-n-Roll and Latin music in her work.

== Early life ==
Han was born in a family of performers in 1971, and sang in the choir starting at the age of five. Her father, a Han Chinese rusticated youth who came to Tibet during the Cultural Revolution, died in 1977. She joined the children's choir in 1980 and received formal training.

In 1987, she joined the PLA second artillery corps command. She began composing songs starting in 1993 which became much more prominent on the later years, including media considering herself invited as a headline singer in the Beijing music scene.

In 1995, she was admitted to the music department of the People's Liberation Army Academy of Art and studied under Li Shuangjiang.

== Career ==
She came to prominence after 2002.

She performed in a Chinese television gala broadcast after the Olympic closing ceremony on August 24, 2008. She also performed at the 2008 Summer Paralympics opening ceremony on September 5, 2008. In October 2015, she became the CEO of Hualu Entertainment company, which includes businesses of creating Television episodes, creating original shows, and managing performances.

On December 20, 2014, Han was also invited to Hunan TV's singing competition I Am a Singer in which she won, making her the first female winner to win the series. Han later returned for two more seasons in the fourth and fifth seasons, both as guest performer in the Biennial concert airing after the live finals. Two months after her finals, she withdrew from her troops much to her dismay.

On April 25, 2016, Han and Zhao Wei were officially revealed among the cast of her second directorial work, "No Other Love".

On May 7, 2016, Han and Wang Han, the latter previously served as the host in I Am a Singer, presented another Hunan TV singing show Come Sing with Me which also produce success in the show's ratings.

On January 27, 2017, Han also received acclaimed on her performance "千年之约" in the annual Chinese New Year special CCTV Spring Festival Gala.

== Style ==
Her music mainly deals with Tibetan themes but she is also influenced by Jazz, R-n-B, Rock-n-Roll and Latin music, which are all reflected in her work. She is able to shift quite easily from piercing high pitches to soft low tone.

Her singing has distinctive Tibetan characteristics. She's able to shift freely from piercing high pitches to soft low tones.

== Significant Music Works ==
Han's signature works are Tibetan Plateau (青藏高原) and Heaven's Road (天路). Tibetan Plateau is very famous and went international. Vitas, the famous Russian singer, sang this song in duet (video is below) at the BTV [television] Spring Global Gala 2010.

Heaven's Road is a folk song released on April 20, 2005, in her Album "Moved" to celebrate the opening of a railway to Tibet in 2006. Written in 2001, the song is very popular in China.

== Discography ==
- 1998: The Brightness of the Snow (雪域光芒)
- 2000: Daybreak a.k.a. Dawn (天亮了)
- 2001: We're all Awake (醒了)
- 2002: Singing (歌唱)
- 2003: Red (红)
- 2005: Love song Fairy Tale (恋曲神话), Moved (感动)
- 2009: Listen to my Voice (听我的声音)
- 2011: Red Song (红歌)

== Social and Charity Activities ==
- 2000: the song "day break" was performed for the CCTV "3.15" party. In April, Han attended the world leaders' summit held in Hawaii, USA, and funded the leadership of delegations from the education foundation for children's health in Tibet. Also, she promoted Tibetan culture in Hawaii.
- 2004: Han Hong arrived in Lhasa and participated in the charity concert entitled "love in the hope of the world" by the youth league committee of Tibet autonomous region and Tibet TV station.
- 2005: Han Hong performed for the tsunami relief charity activity titled with "love without borders acting big performance" in Hong Kong government stadium and donated 100,000 to the United Nations children's fund. In May, Hanhong participated in the fund raising activities of the education health foundation of Tibet, Hong Kong, and achieved great success.
- 2006: Han hong participated in "China's warmth" to focus on AIDS to orphan children.
- 2007: She participated in the public welfare activities held by the youth development foundation. On November 30, she attended the Chinese disabled person welfare foundation co-sponsored the "good" carnival, "cheer for the Chinese disabled person sports delegation" charity event held by China disabled persons' federation. December, she participated in "spring warm 2007, earth love mother water cellar" public welfare party and donated 100 mother water cellar.
- 2008: The personal income of the concert was donated to three ethnic orphan schools in Tibet, xinjiang and Inner Mongolia. On the morning of May 14, Hanhong launched together with the China foundation for poverty alleviation “Hanhong caring and rescue operation” and held a press conference, calling for social fund-raising. On October 7, "Hanhong caring and rescue operation" organization sent warm clothes and assistance payment to the old courtyard of Miyun suburb. Han hong invested in the purchase of household appliances and supplies for elderly person of no family. On December 19, she participated in "love of guangxi, moved about" activities Guangxi and visited children with cerebral palsy there.
- 2009: Hanhong gave the old people down vest, medical equipment, a variety of practical gifts such as multi-purpose wheelchair, for ethnic minorities in Beijing old man bring the blessings of the double ninth festival and condolences n shijingshan national nursing home.
- 2010: After Yushu earthquake, Hanhong came to the Beijing's donation site “Hanhong caring and rescue operation Beijing" and appealed to the people of the country to donate their love and help the people in the affected areas of Yushu. Among them, han hong individual donated 300,000 yuan.
- 2011: Hanhong donated money to build a hospital for the treatment of cataract surgery.
- 2012: Established her own charity organization, Han Hong Love and Charity Fund.
- 2013: In the wake of the ya 'an earthquake, Hanhong announced a donation of 500,000 yuan and launched a donation to the ya 'an compatriots in the south square of the bird's nest on April 21, accepting donations from all sectors of society. On April 26, Hanhong, with the han red charity foundation, sent more than three million yuan to the victims.
- 2014: "the han red love rescue team was also officially set off for the disaster area. On August 10, the charity action of "Hanhong’s love, 100 people's assistance" was officially launched in Xining, Qinghai. Hanhong announced that She would carry tens of millions of aid supplies to the people of qinghai for medical treatment.
- 2015: Launched the "Hundred people rescue Guizhou Province" Campaign, and provide treatment for total 1000 cataract patients. Donated money to construct 10 countryside emergency rooms, buy 30 cars for medical treatment, and 10000 medicine boxes.

== Social Status ==
She was made as member of the 11th CPPCC national committee and one of the spokesperson for the education fund for children's health in China, ambassador of the China foundation for poverty alleviation. She was also the thirteenth recipient of "China Youth May Fourth Medal".

== Personal life ==
She has no children of her own, but in 1999, she adopted a 2 1/2-year-old boy named "Han Houhou", who had lost his parents on October 3, 1999, in an accident due to the Maling River Gorge cable car disaster. She commemorates this in her song "Daybreak".

== Awards and achievements ==
Awards and achievements
Top Chinese Music Chart Awards
| Preceded by Na Ying | Best Female Artist, mainland China; 2004 | Succeeded by Ding Wei |
| Preceded by Ding Wei | Best Female Artist, mainland China; 2006 | Succeeded by Jin Haixin |
| Preceded by Han Lei | Winner of I Am a Singer; 2015 | Succeeded by Coco Lee |
