= Jackie Tam =

Chinese singer

This is a Chinese name; the family name is Tam.

Jackie Tam (Chinese: 譚佑銘; born December 2, 1988, in Shenzhen, China) is a Chinese singer-songwriter who debuted in 2010 after winning fourth place at the 2010 Super Boy singing competition.

== Biography ==
Tam was born in Shenzhen, China, and moved to Canada at the age of 15. Later, he was admitted to the University of Toronto, Canada. In the summer of 2010, Tam attended Super Boy in Guangzhou. He finished fourth out of thirteen contestants.

== Original songs ==
Name	Song information
"Take Girlfriend Home" (Chinese: 女朋友要带回家)	Tan wrote this song to his mother as a birthday present
"Run Run Run Run" (Chinese: 跑跑跑跑)	This song was inspired by his experience of being late for class
"My Grandmother's Smile" (Chinese: 外婆的笑)	A song for his dear grandmother
"Summer" (Chinese: 夏天)	A song describes his memory of childhood
"We Live Here in The Future" (Chinese: 以後我們住這裏)	For his girlfriend
"I Want to Sleep" (Chinese: 好想好想睡)	His swan song in the Super Boy singing competition
"Bubble Tea" (Chinese: 珍珠奶茶)	An English song
"Answer Me: Why Did You Come Home So Late" (Chinese: 說,為什麼這麼晚還不回家)	This song was inspired from his mother's worry about him
"Garbage Can" (Chinese: 垃圾桶)	Written in 30 minutes
"I Should Pick You Up" (Chinese: 再好的活也不拉)	This song was inspired from a taxi driver who served him regardless of those queue jumpers
