= Yu Quan =

Chinese pop duet

Yu·Quan
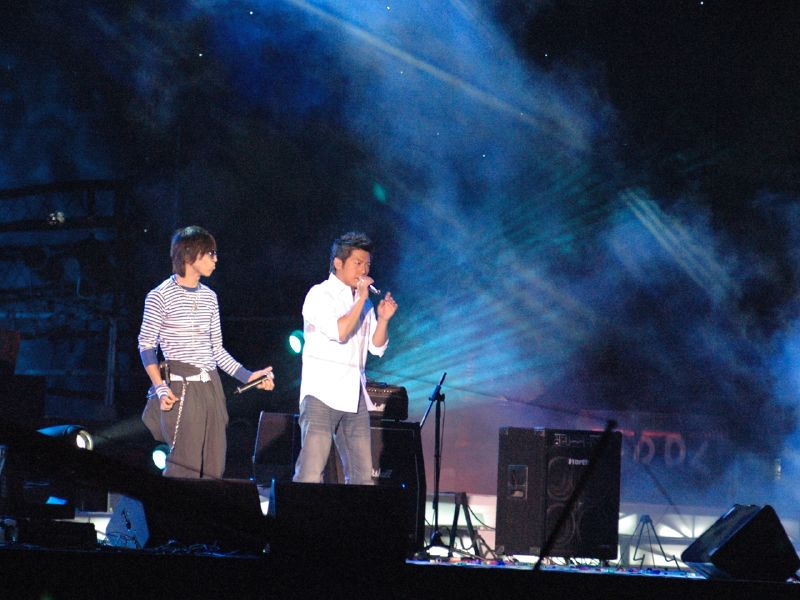
- Occupation: Singer
- Years active: 1999–present
- Television: Let's Sing Kids; I Am a Singer 2013 (winners); Sing My Song (mentors); Sound of My Dream (mentors)

Chinese name
Transcriptions
Standard Mandarin
- Hanyu Pinyin: Yǔ Quán
Yue: Cantonese
- Jyutping: Jyu5 Cyun4
- Musical career
- Origin: China
- Genres: Mandopop, Soft rock
- Members: Chen Yufan (陈羽凡); Hu Haiquan (胡海泉)

Yu·Quan (Chinese: 羽·泉; pinyin: Yǔ Quán) is a Chinese soft rock duet. They were founded in June 1998 as a duo between Chen Yufan (陈羽凡) and Hu Haiquan (胡海泉). They are from Beijing and Shenyang, Liaoning respectively. Both members were born in 1975. They were signed with Taiwanese music distributor Rock Records in 1999. Since then the duo has published a total of nine albums, with over seven million records sold. The duo is very well received in mainland China.

In 2013, the duo competed in the first season of Chinese reality TV show called I Am a Singer (renamed Singer since 2017); the duo won the competition, and the series saw a profound success. They tried to use their way to recall Chinese music among the young generation, and encourage Chinese young musicians to remember and rebuild Chinese music culture. They previously appeared in the show Let's Sing Kids. As of 2020 season of Singer, they remained as the only group winners (and contestants doubled with hosting roles) to win, as winners from succeeding seasons were both soloists and singers not doubling roles as hosts.

They were mentors in the original composition show Sing My Song (2014–2015). During fall 2016, they were judges for music show Sound of My Dream. The show ran from November 2016 to January 2017. Before the show ended, Yu Quan held their seventh consecutive Christmas concert Tree New Bee (Chinese: 树新峰).

== Discography ==
=== Studio album ===
No.	English title	Chinese title	Released
1	The Most Beautiful	最美	10 November 1999
2	Callous to the End	冷酷到底	2000
3	Ardently Love	热爱	2001
4	I can't Live without You	没你不行	2003
5	Thirty	三十	2005
6	Friends are Difficult	朋友难当	2006
7	Everyone Has a Yu Quan in His Heart	每个人心中都有一个羽泉	2009
8	@Myself	@自己	2011
9	Regenerate	再生	2013
10	Dare to Love	敢爱	2014
11	Recalcitrate	不服	2015

Preceded by First	Winner of I Am a Singer; Season 1; 2013	Succeeded by Han Lei
