= Huang Qishan =

Chinese recording artist and musician (born 1968)

Huang Qishan 黄绮珊
- Birth name: Huang Xiaoxia
- Also known as: Sophia Huang, Susan Huang, Huang Ma
- Born: March 23, 1968 (age 57); Chongqing, Sichuan, China
- Occupation(s): Singer, vocalist
- Years active: 1986-present

Chinese name
- Traditional Chinese: 黃綺珊
- Simplified Chinese: 黄绮珊
Transcriptions
Standard Mandarin
- Hanyu Pinyin: Huáng Qǐshān
- Musical career
- Origin: China
- Genres: C-pop, Gospel music, C-rock
- Labels: Beijing Qishan Culture Communication Co Ltd. Sony Music Entertainment

Huang Qishan (Chinese: 黄绮珊; born March 23, 1968) is a Chinese recording artist and musician. She is also known as Sophia Huang, Susan Huang and Huang Ma (Mother Huang). She is referred to as the "no. 1 female voice in Asia" by some Chinese media. Huang Qishan, despite her rare vocal talent and twenty-seven year experiences in the music industry, did not achieve much success in her home country of China until appearing on the show I Am A Singer in early 2013. Huang Qishan's performance caused an Internet sensation that led to her almost-overnight popularity.

== Life and musical career ==
Huang debuted in 1986. Throughout her career, she has released seven albums, despite not gaining a large fan base in China. In 1996, she divorced her husband, a Taiwanese singer and songwriter.

Huang sang the 2004 Olympic theme "Pride" (骄傲).

Despite being unknown to most of China's population, music insiders highly valued her due to her singing abilities. In 2013, because of her insider connections, the producer of China's version of the Korean reality singing competition I Am a Singer (Chinese Season 1) (now renamed to Singer from 2017), asked her to join the show, leading to her long-awaited fame in China. During the show, Huang rose to fame and gained recognition throughout China due to her vocal ability and ability to reach extremely high notes. In the finals, she placed 3rd overall.

In 2016, Huang participated on Jiangsu Television's long running music program Mask Singer (Chinese TV series). That same year, she was nominated for Best Mandarin Female Singer at the 27th Golden Melody Awards for her album "Xiao Xia".

In October 2017, Huang released the single "I Will Be Good". A personal concert was also held later that year in November.

In June 2018, Huang released a new album titled "Time". The album featured a song with a collaboration from Jam Hsiao

In 2019, Huang returned to television as a contestant on music show "The Chart" placing 3rd in the first round and 2nd in the second and third round.

== Musical style ==
Huang has performed a variety of musical styles including pop, jazz, soul, R&B, and classical crossovers. Her influences include Teresa Teng, Aretha Franklin, Janis Joplin, Ray Charles, and Stevie Wonder. Due to her vocal versatility and almost four-octave range, Huang Qishan has covered songs from many of the world's most-renowned vocalists including Mariah Carey, Whitney Houston, and Celine Dion.

Huang is a devout Christian and undertook theology studies in 2012. She has recorded some gospel music.

== Vocal abilities and critical reception ==
Huang's astounding vocal abilities have earned her fame throughout China. She is a dramatic soprano, exhibiting a range of C3 to F#6, but claims to have sung up to G#6 in full and connected voice (in an interview discussing the creative process of the recording of the song "Wine-Like Memory" (酒般的记忆), a producer working with Huang noted his surprise at her ability to sustain the G#6 in a pharyngeal tone ("open throat"). Huang is noted for her powerful upper register and her ability to reach as high as a C#6 or D6 with mixed voices.

Huang is noted by Chinese vocal experts to be a technically proficient singer, with some hailing her as "Asia's most perfect voice" and calling her technical proficiency "unparalleled."

Many cite her song "Only You" (只有你) to demonstrate her technical mastery and her ability to shift seamlessly through various vocal techniques. One of China's premier vocal coaches claimed to never have heard anyone in Asia sing in this way.

== Awards ==
On October 7, 2013, Huang was awarded the title "Best Chinese Singer" at the tenth annual Huading Awards.

In 2016, Huang was nominated for Best Mandarin Female Singer at the 27th Golden Melody Awards for her album "Xiao Xia".

== Personal life ==
Huang's ex-husband is Taiwanese music creator Michael Tu, and some of his more famous compositions "Cutting Love" and "Listening To The Sea" (sang by A-Mei) are works after their divorce. The former was sung by Huang herself many years later on I Am a Singer (Chinese Season 1). The following year, Michael Tu became one of the expert jury members in the second season of I Am a Singer (Chinese Season 2).

Huang converted to evangelical Protestantism in 2003, and received baptism a year later. In 2012, she began to study theology at Singapore's Baptist Theological Seminary.
