= The One (singer) =

South Korean singer

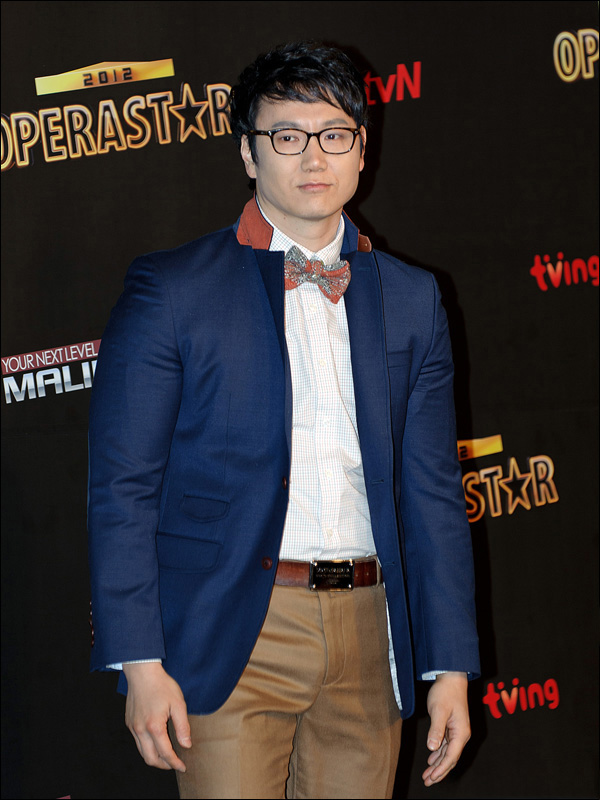

Background information
- Born: March 26, 1974 (age 52); Seoul, South Korea
- Occupation: Singer
- Years active: 1997–present

Korean name
- Hangul: 정순원
- RR: Jeong Sunwon
- MR: Chŏng Sunwŏn

Jeong Soon-won (Korean: 정순원; born March 26, 1974), better known by his stage name The One (Korean: 더 원) is a South Korean singer and vocal coach. He debuted in 1997 as a member the group Space A and released his first solo album in 2002. He has released a total of five albums in Korean and one in Mandarin. As a vocal coach, he has taught K-pop singers including members of Girls' Generation (most notably Taeyeon) and Super Junior.

He won the second season of the Korean version of I Am a Singer in 2012, and finished in third place in the third season in the Chinese version of I Am A Singer in 2015.

== Discography ==
=== Studio albums ===
- 2002: The Last Gift, The One!
- 2004: The One
- 2008: The Last
- 2011: Walking Again (다시 걷는다)
- 2014: Who's The One I'm The One
