= Wang Han (host) =

Chinese television host

- 汪涵
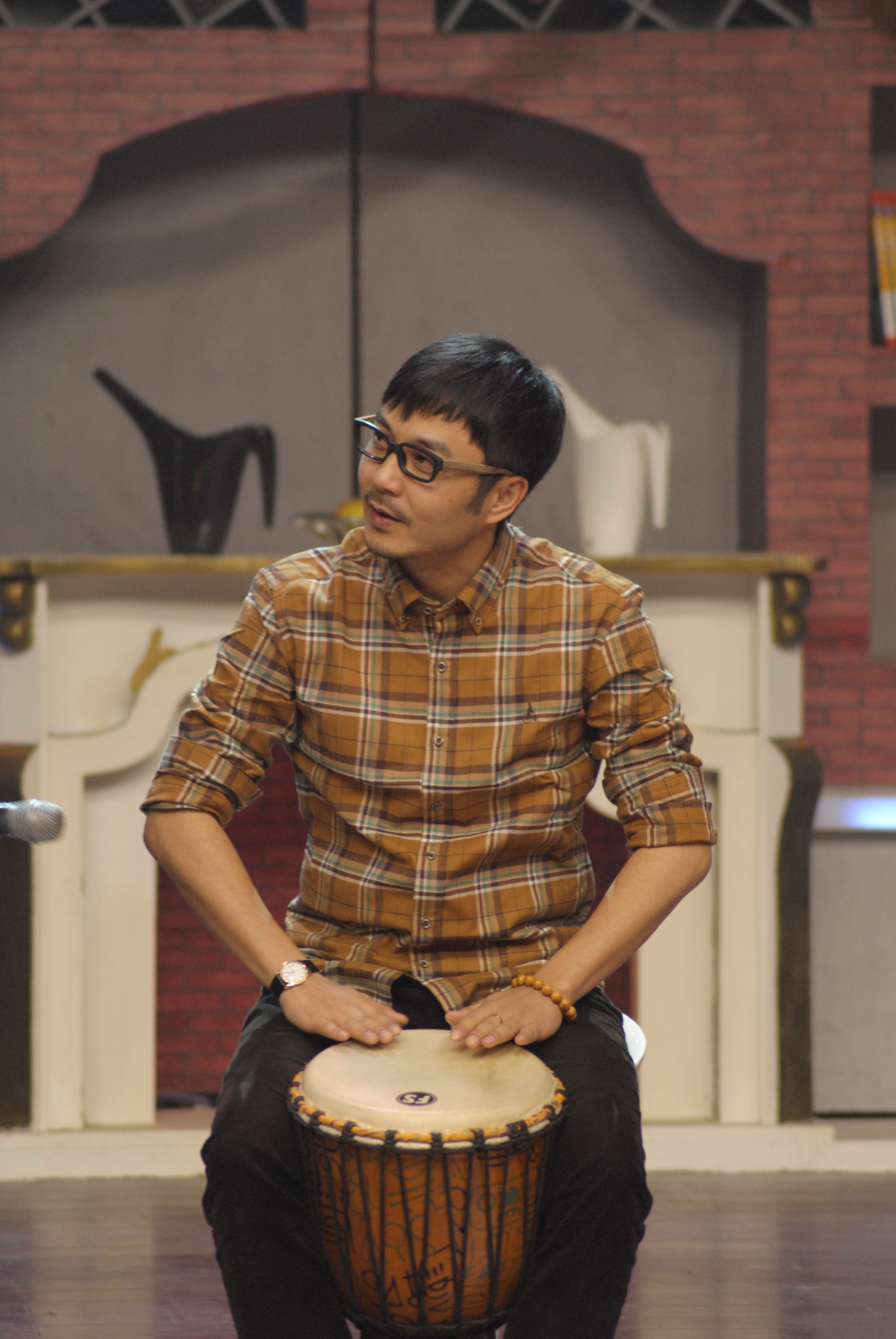
- Wang Han in November 2011
- Born: Wang Jiangang (汪建刚); 7 April 1974 (age 52); Suzhou, Jiangsu, China
- Education: Hunan Mass Media Vocational Technical College
- Occupations: Host, singer, actor, author
- Years active: 1996–present
- Known for: Day Day Up
- Television: Hunan Television
- Spouse: Yang Lele
- Children: 1

Chinese name
- Chinese: 汪涵
Transcriptions
Standard Mandarin
- Hanyu Pinyin: Wāng Hán

Wang Jiangang
- Simplified Chinese: 汪建刚
- Traditional Chinese: 汪建剛
Transcriptions
Standard Mandarin
- Hanyu Pinyin: Wāng Jiàngāng

Wang Han (Chinese: 汪涵; pinyin: Wāng Hán; born 7 April 1974), is a Chinese television host. A mainstay of Hunan TV, he is known for his wit, on-stage composure, and proficiency in multiple Chinese dialects.

== Music works ==
Play Boy (Chinese: 花花公子) — Released in 2006

== Movie works ==
Almost Perfect (Chinese: 十全九美) — (Released in 2008)

== Television works ==
Year	Title	Chinese title	Role
2016	Come Sing with Me	我想和你唱	Host
2015	Up Idol	偶像来了	Host
2010	Super Boy	快乐男声	Host
2009	Super Girl	超级女声	Host
2008 - 2022	Day Day Up	天天向上	Host
2007	Super Boy	快乐男声	Host

== Filmography ==
=== Film ===
Year	English title	Chinese title	Role	Notes
2008	Almost Perfect	十全九美	Yun Wan's client	
2018	A First Farewell	第一次的离别	Castaway Entertainment	

== Book ==
- Wang Han (2010). 有味 [Interesting] (in Chinese). Nanning, Guangxi: Guangxi Normal University Press. ISBN 9787563393664.
- Wang Han; Lai Youxian (2007). 搞怪大侠W [Funny Heroes W] (in Chinese). Changsha, Hunan: Hunan Literature and Art Press. ISBN 9787540439668.

== Awards ==
- 2004: The yearly national best entertainment variety show host award
- 2004: The best entertainment show host of China award
- 2006: The yearly most excellent host award
- 2006: The 6th Jin Ying Festival—China's excellent TV host award
- 2007: The new weekly TV list—The yearly most outstanding entertainment show host award

== Personal life ==
Wang Han has been married twice. His first wife was Hunan TV hostess Lin Jing (林菁). They married in 2000, but divorced in 2001. He married his second wife, Hunan TV hostess Yang Lele (杨乐乐), in 2006. Their son, Wang Shi'an (汪十安), nicknamed Xiao Mumu (小沐沐), was born on November 19, 2014.
