= Arrival =

Arrival(s) or The Arrival(s) may refer to:

== Film ==
- The Arrival (1991 film), an American science fiction horror film
- The Arrival (1996 film), an American-Mexican science fiction horror film
- Arrival (film), a 2016 American science fiction film by Denis Villeneuve

== Literature ==
- Arrival (novel), 2009, by Chris Morphew
- Arrival (story collection) or Stories of Your Life and Others, 2016, by Ted Chiang
- The Arrival (graphic novel), 2006, by Shaun Tan
- The Arrival (Applegate novel), a 2000 Animorphs novel by K.A. Applegate
- The Arrivals, a 2013 novel by Melissa Marr

== Music ==
- Arrival (band), a British close-harmony pop-rock band with two eponymous albums

=== Albums ===
- Arrival (ABBA album) or the title instrumental (see below), 1976
- Arrival (Cymande album), 1981
- Arrival (Horace Parlan album) or the title instrumental, 1974
- Arrival (Jordan Rudess album), 1988
- Arrival (Journey album), 2000
- Arrival (Rosie Gaines album) or the title song, 1997
- Arrival (EP), or Jianglin, by Top Combine, or the title song, 2008
- The Arrival (album), by Hypocrisy, 2004
- The Arrival (EP), by Bliss n Eso, 2000
- The Arrival, by Magic Kingdom, 1999

=== Songs ===
- "Arrival" (composition), by ABBA, 1976
- "Arrival", by Daft Punk from the Tron: Legacy film soundtrack, 2010
- "Arrival", by Parannoul from After the Magic, 2023
- "Arrivals", by Silverstein from This Is How the Wind Shifts, 2013

== Television episodes ==
- "Arrival" (The Prisoner), 1967
- "Arrival" (The Prisoner 2009), inspired by the 1967 episode
- "Arrival" (Smallville), 2005
- "Arrivals" (The White Lotus), 2021
- "The Arrival" (Fringe), 2008
- "The Arrival" (The Jeffersons), 1980
- "The Arrival" (The Twilight Zone), 1961
- "The Arrival" (The Vicar of Dibley), 1994

== Video games ==
- The Arrival (video game), a 1997 adventure game
- Mass Effect 2: Arrival, 2010
- Slender: The Arrival, 2013

== Other uses ==
- The Arrival (painting), a 1913 painting by C R.W. Nevinson
- Arrival (company), a British electric vehicle manufacturer
- The Arrival (installation), a 2013 art installation in Indianapolis, Indiana, US
- Arrival Heights, Ross Island, Antarctica
- NXT Arrival, a 2014 wrestling event

== See also ==
- Arrive (disambiguation)
- Arriving (disambiguation)
