= Wicked Lovely =

2007 novel by Melissa Marr

- Author: Melissa Marr
- Cover artist: Mark Tucker (photography)
- Language: English
- Series: Wicked Lovely
- Genre: Young adult fiction Urban fantasy
- Publisher: HarperTeen, HarperCollins imprint (US), HarperCollins (UK)
- Publication date: June 12, 2007 (US)
- Publication place: United States
- Media type: Print (hardback and paperback), audiobook, e-book
- Pages: 328
- ISBN: 978-0-06-121465-3
- OCLC: 123118232
- LC Class: PZ7.M34788 Wi 2007
- Followed by: Ink Exchange

Wicked Lovely is a young adult/urban fantasy novel by author Melissa Marr. The story follows protagonist Aislinn, who has the Sight (the ability to see faeries), and whose life begins to unravel when it seems the fey-folk develop a sudden interest in her. The novel intertwines the old rules of fairytales and folklore with the modern expectations of adolescent 21st-century life. It was published by HarperTeen, a division of HarperCollins, in June 2007 in the US. Wicked Lovely was originally written as a short story, ('The Sleeping Girl'), before the author decided to expand on her work in order to further develop the characters. She completed the novel over a period of four months, and submitted it to an agent in January, 2006. By early March of that year, it had been accepted for publication.

== Plot ==
=== Summary ===
The story follows main protagonist, Aislinn, who is attempting to navigate through adolescent life alongside a constant struggle with her life-long ability to see faeries and fey-kind. Though invisible to most mortals, faeries live among them, often playing the trickster, living on the fringes, with only the most prominent faeries possessing the power to reveal themselves to the human world. The court fey, the royalty amongst their kind, do not often concern themselves with human kind, which is why Aislinn is disconcerted when she finds that two such powerful fey have begun following her.

Keenan, King of Summer, and Donia, the Winter Girl, are at odds, as they have been for decades, both trying to win over Aislinn for their own ends; Keenan believes she may be his new Summer Queen and hopes she will take up this mantle and the risks that involves, while Donia is bound by the rules of the Winter Queen to warn Aislinn of the consequences that may befall her, should she choose to take Keenan's hand. Unbeknownst to the two quarrelling fey, Aislinn seeks safety within the protective, iron walls of her friend Seth's transformed-trainyard home, and comfort from the arms of Seth himself, whom she has developed feelings for.

As the story progresses, Aislinn finds it increasingly difficult to stay away from Keenan's allure despite her feelings and the developing relationship with Seth, whose research into faeries and proximity to Aislinn begin to attract unwanted and dangerous attention. What's more, Aislinn's abilities are advancing well beyond just the Sight. Keenan later informs her that, due to her being chosen, there is no way back to her life as before, and she must make the choice that decides not just her own future, but that of faery-kind.

=== Themes ===
There are two major recurrent themes within the book; rules and choices. The tagline for the book are the three rules Grams tells Aislinn to follow in order to stay anonymous to faery-kind:

'Rule #3: Don't stare at invisible faeries.

Rule #2: Don't speak to invisible faeries.

Rule #1: Don't ever attract their attention.'

The novel begins with these rules being tested almost immediately, as Aislinn already has their attention, for reasons yet unknown to her. As the story goes on, Aislinn has to battle against these ingrained rules set for her safety and challenge, even disregard, what she thinks she knows. Another significant aspect of the story regarding rules is that of those set by the Winter Queen. In order to restore Keenan's full power, both he and Donia are tasked with finding and persuading his suitors for whichever end; take the staff and become either the new Winter Girl or the Summer Queen, or avoid the risk and become a Summer Girl. However, Donia begins to suspect foul-play as Beira changes the rules by which they have played for centuries, and threatens Donia's existence if she does not comply. The importance of this theme revolves around the characters challenging these rules, and that they should not be accepted and followed purely at face value.

This leads onto the other main theme of the book which is choices. In a version of Wicked Lovely containing an extra 'Chatting with Melissa Marr', the author details how she wishes to impart a message of the importance of making one's own choices, and is also referenced in an interview with book bloggers 'The Book Smugglers'. Marr comments how not making choices results in accepting limitations. This is significant, for within the book, when characters challenge the rules and make their own choices, they find new options and solutions.

Marr also comments in interviews and author bios how, due to growing up believing in magical and mythical creatures and ideas, her books are strongly influenced by folklore and fairytales. In the book each new chapter begins with a quote and reference to a book on folklore, magic, myths or legends.

== Characters ==
- Aislinn Foy: (Ash-ling or As-linge) The main protagonist and one of the three point-of-view characters. Since birth she has had the Sight; the ability to see faeries. Aislinn longs for an ordinary life, but due to circumstances before her birth and beyond her control, she is bound to Keenan and the fey world, regardless of her feelings and fears. She struggles to find comfort and balance between her two worlds, though Seth helps to provide both, and seeks to keep him and her mortals friends safe from the unseen world.
- Seth Morgan: Aislinn's friend and love interest. Even-tempered and open-minded, he trusts Aislinn's story when she informs him of the invisible world beyond his sight. Seth becomes her calm and guiding hand, but also a target to those who do not wish to see Aislinn take up the mantle of Summer Queen. As events unfold, their relationship develops and is tested in varying ways, and though flirty, never pushes Aislinn, allowing her to define the extent of their relationship.
- Keenan: The Summer King and one of the three point-of-view characters. Born of both the Summer and Winter courts, his mother bound his powers after killing his father. To return to his full strength, a suitor chosen by his dreams must freely choose to take the Winter Queen's staff and risk the same fortune as Donia and be found worthy of the mantle of Summer Queen. Keenan has a temperament as volatile as summer itself; warm and inviting, or wild and stormy.
- Donia: (Don-ya) The Winter Girl and one of the three point-of-view characters. Former object of Keenan's dreams, she once risked the Winter Queen's chill and lost, and has since been subject to her will and rules; she must dissuade Keenan's potential suitor from taking the Winter Queen's staff and restoring power to the Summer court. Still bitter over the consequences, Donia shies away from her lingering feelings for Keenan, though still wishing she was his queen.
- Beira: The Winter Queen and Keenan's mother. Though once believed to have truly loved the late King of Summer, the faery of Chaos manipulated her onto killing her lover and father of her child, and bind the powers of her son so as to rein unchecked and bring disorder to the faery and mortal realms alike.
- Grams: Aislinn's grandmother. She also has the Sight, and has raised Aislinn from birth. She wishes to protect Aislinn from the faery world, but in doing so denies her the truth regarding her mother and the unwanted ties with that bind her to Keenan.

== Reception ==
Reviews for the novel have been mostly positive, having received praise and acclaim from several notable names, including Publishers Weekly, The New York Times, The Washington Post, and The Bulletin of the Center for Children's Books. Wicked Lovely debuted at #8 on the New York Times children's books bestseller list, and reached as high as #2, and stayed there for 11 weeks. Annette Klause spoke highly of the work in The Washington Post, praising the "fully realized" world and the romance, while other reviewers, such as Charles de Lint, highlight both the tight plotting and the characterization. Nevertheless, there is some concern with the character of the Winter Queen: Klause found her to "a little too over the top to be totally threatening", while de Lint simply describes her as "a bit of a stock villain". The novel is described as being aimed at the Young Adult market, and some reviews chose to emphasize this, noting that the sexual tension and the "underlying darkness" ensure that Wicked Lovely is primarily appropriate for the over 12's. Book reviewer Matt Berman with Common Sense Media comments that, although it begins to tackle some mature themes that arise within young adult fiction, its "strong, fluid, and respectful characters are an asset" as they face both supernatural and adolescent issues, and is rated for ages 13+.

=== Awards and honours ===
- New York Public Library's Books for the Teen Age 2008
- Amazon's Best Books of 2007: Top 10 Editor's Picks: Teens
- IRA Notable Books 2008: Young Adult Fiction
- 2008 - Romance Writers of America RITA Award, Young Adult Romance

== Translations and international release ==
According to Marr's official website, the international translation rights have been sold to 26 different countries:

1. English (North America)- HarperCollins
2. English (UK)- HarperCollins
3. German- Carlsen Verlag
4. German Adult edition- Piper Verlag
5. Italian- Fazi Editore
6. French- Albin Michel
7. Swedish- DAMM Forlag
8. Spanish- Salamandra
9. Finnish- WSOY
10. Japanese- Tokyo Sogensha
11. Portuguese (Brazil)– Rocco
12. Portuguese (Portugal)- Saída de Emergência
13. Indonesian- Gramedia
14. Romanian- RAO
15. Russian– Eksmo
16. Thai- Pearl Printing
17. Vietnamese– Innovative Publishing & Media
18. Turkish- Artemis Yayinlari
19. Hungarian- Kelly Kiado
20. Polish- NASZA KSIĘGARNIA
21. Chinese- Read 99
22. Estonian- Pegasus
23. Croatian- Algoritam
24. Bulgarian- Panorama Group
25. Hebrew- Kinneret-Zmora
26. Korean- Screenseller, LTD

Within some countries the title has been altered. Some examples include the Swedish version published under the title Mer än ögat ser meaning 'More than the eye sees', in German under the title of Gegen das Sommerlicht meaning 'Against/Towards the Summer Light', in Spanish under Encanto fatal meaning 'Fatal Enchantment'), and in Croatian under the name Opako ljupki.

== Film adaptation ==
In 2011 it was announced that Wicked Lovely had been optioned by Universal Mary Harron had been attached as the director and Caroline Thompson was named to write the screenplay, but the movie was abandoned and put into turnaround that same year. In June 2013 Marr announced on Goodreads that the film had been picked up by IM Global along with Richelle Mead's Vampire Academy. Originally set up at Universal by Wild West Picture Show Productions, the project is now freed up and WWPSP has brought in indie production house Pukeko Pictures to produce and oversee special effects, and Weta Workshop for design and physical effects.

== Sequels and spin-offs ==
=== Wicked Lovely series novels ===
- Wicked Lovely (2007)
- Ink Exchange (2008)
- Fragile Eternity (2009)
- Radiant Shadows (2010)
- Stopping Time (2010)
- Old Habits (2011)
- Darkest Mercy (2011)
- Desert Tales (2013)

=== Wicked Lovely: Desert Tales graphic novel series ===
- Volume 1: Sanctuary (2009)
- Volume 2: Challenge (2010)
- Volume 3: Resolve (2011)

=== Collections ===
- short story 'Love Struck' in Love is Hell (2008)
- Faery Tales and Nightmares (2011)
