= Darkest Mercy =

2011 novel by Melissa Marr

- Author: Melissa Marr
- Cover artist: Mark Tucker (photography)
- Language: English
- Series: Wicked Lovely
- Genre: Young adult Urban fantasy
- Publisher: HarperTeen, an imprint of HarperCollins
- Publication date: February 22, 2011
- Publication place: United States
- Media type: Print (Hardcover)
- Pages: 352
- ISBN: 978-0-0616-5925-6
- OCLC: 666573450
- Preceded by: Radiant Shadows

Darkest Mercy is an Urban fantasy novel by Melissa Marr. It is set in the same universe as Marr's previous YA novels, but is not a sequel to Radiant Shadows; rather, it is a follow-up to Wicked Lovely and Fragile Eternity.

== Critical response ==
Kirkus found it hard work, "for fans only". However RT Book Reviews was much more positive, seeing it as an excellent if shocking conclusion to the series.
