= Paths of Glory (painting) =

1917 painting by C. R. W. Nevinson

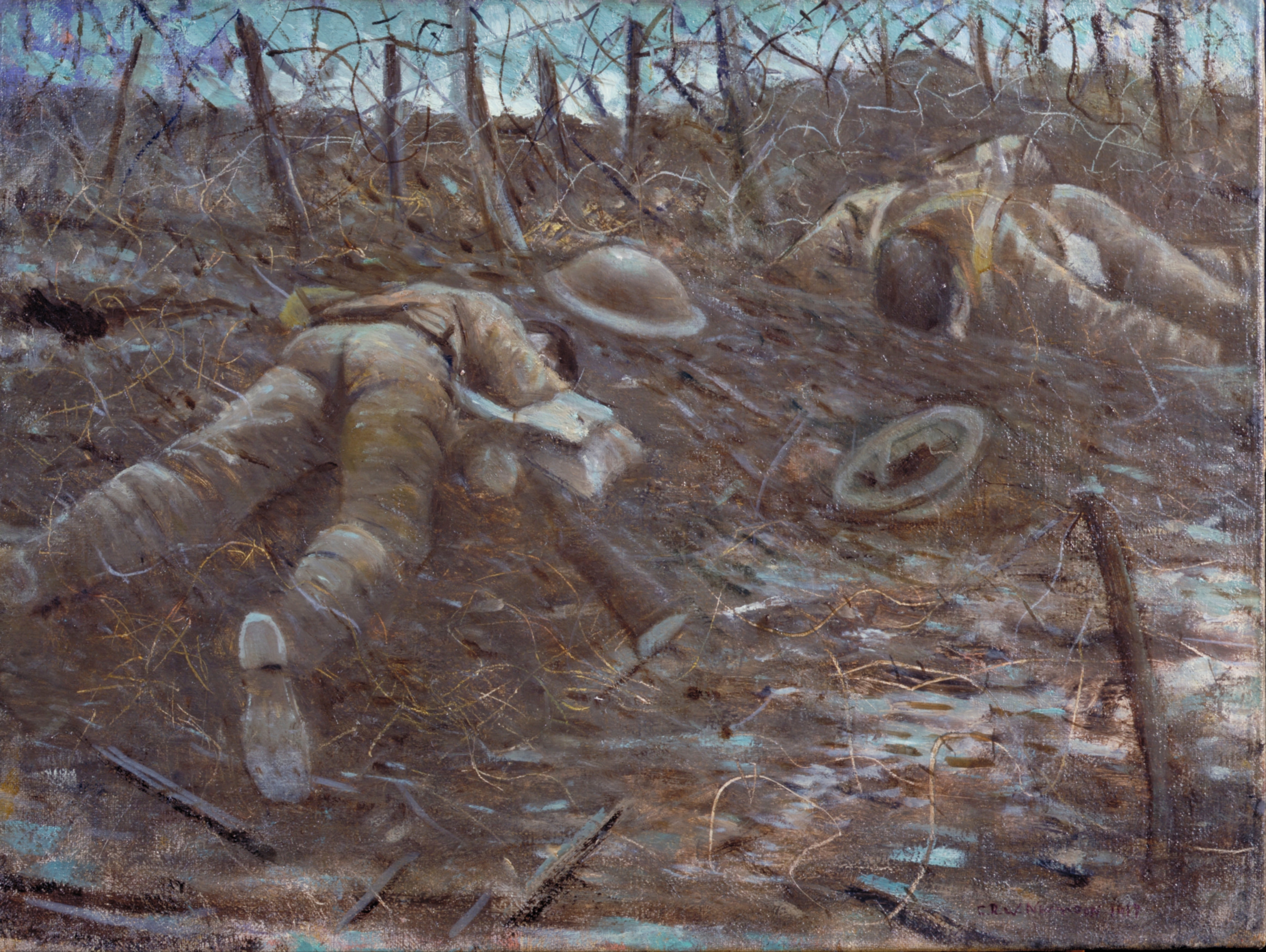
- Artist: C. R. W. Nevinson
- Year: 1917
- Type: Oil painting
- Dimensions: 46 cm × 61 cm (18 in × 24 in)
- Location: Imperial War Museum, London

Paths of Glory is a 1917 painting by British artist C. R. W. Nevinson. The title quotes from a line from Thomas Gray's 1750 poem Elegy Written in a Country Churchyard: "The paths of glory lead but to the grave". It is held by the Imperial War Museum in London, which describes it as "one of Nevinson's most famous paintings".

== Background ==
Nevinson had served as a volunteer ambulance driver with the Friends' Ambulance Service on the Western Front in the early months of the First World War, from November 1914 to January 1915, and then returned to England. He served as an orderly in the Royal Army Medical Corps in London but was invalided out in late 1915 due to rheumatic fever. During this period he painted several paintings such as La Mitrailleuse (1915) and The Doctor (1916).

He was commissioned as a war artist in 1917 and was sent to France by the British War Propaganda Bureau. He adopted a Realist style to depict the horror of the war, moving decisively away from his earlier Modernist and Vorticist styles.

== Painting ==
The painting measures 45.7 × 60.9 centimetres (18.0 × 24.0 in). It depicts two dead British soldiers, face down in a battlefield on the Western Front. They lie unburied in a muddy landscape that is bare save for barriers of barbed wire and the detritus of war.

The painting was censored by the official censor of paintings and drawings in France, Lieutenant-colonel Arthur Lee, on the grounds that displaying dead bodies would hinder the war effort. Nonetheless, Nevinson included the painting in his official exhibition at the Leicester Galleries in March 1918, but the work was displayed with a brown paper strip across the bodies bearing the word "censored". Nevinson was reprimanded by the War Office for exhibiting a censored image, and for using the word "censored" in public without authorisation, but obtained significant publicity, particularly as the first exhibition of official colour tinted photographs from the front (including images of actual dead bodies) opened on 4 March. The painting was bought by the Imperial War Museum direct from the exhibition, as the work had been commissioned by the Ministry of Information.
