= Feeling So Good =

"Feelin' So Good" is a 2000 song by Jennifer Lopez.

Feelin' So Good or Feeling So Good may refer to:

- Jennifer Lopez: Feelin' So Good video
- "Feeling So Good", Manfred Mann Hugg 1967
- "Feelin' So Good (S.K.O.O.B.Y.-D.O.O.)", song by The Archies, Barry & Kim 1969 covered by Geno Washington, The Arrivals 1969 Bernd Spier
- "Feelin' So Good", song by Willie Bobo, Keys 1967
- "Feeling So Good", a song by Ashley Tisdale from Symptoms, 2019
