= Carnival of Souls (disambiguation) =

Carnival of Souls is a 1962 horror film.

Carnival of Souls may also refer to:

- Carnival of Souls (1998 film), a 1998 remake of the 1962 film
- Carnival of Souls (Miranda Sex Garden album), 2000
- Carnival of Souls (The Wishing Tree album), 1996
- Carnival of Souls: The Final Sessions, a 1997 album by Kiss
- Carnival of Souls (Buffy novel), a 2006 Buffy the Vampire Slayer tie-in novel
- Untamed City: Carnival of Secrets, a young adult fantasy novel by Melissa Marr
- Carnival of Souls, a 2014 album by Pere Ubu
- "Carnival of Souls", a song by Sopor Aeternus from the album Mitternacht - The Dark Night of the Soul
- "Carnival of Souls", a song by Jedi Mind Tricks on the album Violence Begets Violence
- "Carnival of Souls", a song by Gene Simmons on the 2004 album Asshole
