= Jianglin =

Jianglin may refer to:

- Wu Jianglin, see List of members of the 11th National People's Congress
- Liu Gong, Prince of Jianglin, son of Emperor Ming of Han
- Jianglin (EP), an EP by Top Combine
