= Arrive =

Arrive may refer to:

- Arrive (company), a Norwegian transport information company
- Arrive (Swedish company), a company that acquired the parking payment app ParkMobile
- Arrivé, a residential high-rise building in Seattle, United States
- Saint-Gladie-Arrive-Munein, a French commune
- ARRIVE guidelines to improve experimental design for animal research

== See also ==
- Arriving (disambiguation)
- Arrival (disambiguation)
