= Arriving (disambiguation) =

Arriving is a 2004 album by Chris Tomlin.

Arriving may also refer to:

- Arriving (Loose Tubes album), a 2015 English jazz ensemble album
- "Arriving", a song by Harold Budd and John Foxx from Translucence/Drift Music, 2003
- "Arriving", a song by Evelyn Glennie from Touch the Sound, 2004

== See also ==
- Arrive (disambiguation)
- Arrival (disambiguation)
