= The Soul of the Soulless City =

Painting by C. R. W. Nevinson

- Artist: C. R. W. Nevinson
- Year: 1920
- Medium: Oil on canvas
- Dimensions: 91.5 cm × 60.8 cm (36.0 in × 23.9 in)
- Location: Tate Britain, London

The Soul of the Soulless City, originally titled New York – an Abstraction, is an oil on canvas painting by the English artist C. R. W. Nevinson, from 1920. It is held in the Tate Britain, in London. It depicts a fictional part of the elevated railway in Manhattan, painted in a style influenced by cubism and futurism.

== Creation ==
Nevinson visited New York City for the first time in 1919 and was immediately impressed by the city. He made many sketches of which some were turned into paintings. He painted New York – an Abstraction after his return to London and before his second visit to New York in October 1920. The second visit however left him embittered, possibly due to the poor reviews of his exhibition at Frederick Keppel & Co.

== Provenance ==
New York – an Abstraction was first exhibited at the Bourgeois Galleries in New York in 1920. When it was exhibited at the Faculty of Arts Exhibition in London in 1925, Nevinson's disillusionment with the city had caused him to rename it The Soul of the Soulless City.

The painting was acquired by Tate in 1998 and is on display at Tate Britain. In 2014 Tate presented a virtual version of the painting in the video game Minecraft.
