= Ink Exchange =

2008 novel written by Melissa Marr

- Author: Melissa Marr
- Cover artist: Mark Tucker (photography)
- Language: English
- Series: Wicked Lovely
- Genre: Young adult Urban fantasy
- Publisher: HarperTeen, an imprint of HarperCollins
- Publication date: April 24, 2008
- Publication place: United States
- Media type: Print (Hardcover)
- Pages: 352
- Preceded by: Wicked Lovely
- Followed by: Fragile Eternity

Ink Exchange is an urban fantasy novel written by Melissa Marr. It is set in the same universe as Marr's previous novel, Wicked Lovely, but is not a sequel; rather, it is a companion novel that focuses on a different set of characters. Despite being a companion novel, its plot elements connect chronologically to Marr's following novel, Fragile Eternity.

== Plot summary ==
The prologue of Ink Exchange recalls a scene from Wicked Lovely narrated by Irial, King of the Dark Court, in which he walks into a tattoo shop with Leslie, a 17-year-old human. The novel then follows Leslie as she prepares for a normal day of school. Leslie's alcoholic father and Ren, her drug-dealing brother, neglect her. Having once been drugged and raped by Ren's customers to cover a debt, Leslie fears her family, yet still pays the bills by working as a waitress. When Leslie reaches school she is suspicious of how well Aislinn, the protagonist from Wicked Lovely, has adjusted to her new life as a faery, a type of supernatural entity. Aislinn, formerly human, is the Summer Queen in the world of the fey, a world which she tries desperately to keep from Leslie.

The novel changes perspective to follow Irial. It is revealed that the Dark Court feeds off of emotions such as anger, hate, pain, and other negative emotions to stay strong. When another faery is killed by an ordinary bullet, Irial is desperate for a way to protect his kind. With the help of his "left hand" Gabriel and his pack of "Hounds," keep his own and other courts in check. When confronted with numerous rebellions, Irial decides to pursue an ink exchange with a mortal to provide a constant stream of emotion to feed his court. After Leslie, the chosen one, receives a tattoo, traditional tattoo ink is exchanged for Dark Court blood and tears to connect the two.

Leslie soon starts to feel and perceive her surroundings as Irial would, seeing past faeries' human disguises as an effect of the ink exchange. When she falls in love with Niall she avoids admitting her connection to his world. Her connection to the faeries deepens when she returns to the tattoo shop and begins to hear Irial's voice in her head. Irial has come to the conclusion that he loves her, and refuses to let any harm come to her. When Leslie goes to a club to celebrate her finished tattoo with Seth and Niall, Irial begins to speak through Leslie to deflect the advances of other faeries. In the club, Irial and Leslie finally unite, connected by a shadow vine that represents the ink exchange. Niall, still in love, soon tells Leslie that he can help her break the bond with Irial, should she ever want to.

Over the next few weeks, Leslie blurs in and out of consciousness, incapable of leaving Irial's side for more than a minute. When Leslie begins to understand that Irial is feeding on her negative emotions, leaving her incapable of feeling them, she realizes he has taken away her freedom to live. In an attempt to inflict more pain onto Leslie to feed his court, Irial and his faeries murder several human companions at once, committing the acts as in scenes from plays, much to Leslie's displeasure. When Leslie asks Niall to help free her, he uses sunlight and frost taken from the Winter and Summer Queens to burn and freeze the link and the tattoo off Leslie.

Before restoring her human life and leaving the faerie world behind, Leslie goes to Irial one last time, asking him never to use the ink exchange on another human again. He solemnly agrees. The novel ends with Irial making Niall the new king of the dark court and them both watching Leslie and her new human friends.

== Characters ==
- Leslie – The protagonist. She has recently been through traumatic events and is struggling to regain control of her life. She chooses to get a tattoo that ties her to Irial. This tattoo is central to the plot of the novel.
- Irial – Faerie King of the Dark Court. He is connected to Leslie by the ink exchange in order to feed his emotion-hungry court of dark fey. He ends up falling in love with her and giving his court to Niall.
- Niall – Faerie who previously served Irial and the Dark Court, but left them after it was revealed to him that his touch left mortals hooked on his skin, and instead became an adviser to the Summer king. He watches over Leslie and comes to love her, though he knows he shouldn't. He ends up leaving the Summer Court in an attempt to save Leslie and becomes the Dark King. He is a Gancanagh.
- Gabriel – Irial's "left hand" and trusted enforcer. The father of Rabbit, Ani, and Tish, he is forever loyal to Irial and is known for his violent methods of subduing rebellions in the dark fey. He is the leader of the Hounds, of whom everyone but Bananach are terrified of.
- Aislinn – The Summer Queen and a friend of Leslie's. She is concerned about Leslie's involvement with the faeries.
- Seth – Aislinn's boyfriend. He used to dislike Leslie because of her connection to her older brother Ren, but tries to guide Leslie to talk to Aislinn about her problems once he realises she has nothing in common with her brother.
- Keenan – The Summer King and Aislinn's consort.
- Rabbit – The tattoo artist that carries out the Ink Exchange between Leslie and Irial. He is Gabriel's son, and half human. Irial protects him against the wrath of the less tolerant Dark fey.
- Bananach - The embodiment of war and in Irial's court. She tries to entice Niall into overthrowing Irial and starting her war. She is the twin of order. She is always giving Gabriel trouble.
- Tish - Rabbit's sister, Gabriel's daughter, and half human. Between herself and Ani, she is the responsible sister.
- Ani - The irresponsible, rebellious sister that is able to feed by tasting human blood. Irial finds her interesting and potentially helpful.

== Reception ==
Ink Exchange was a New York Times Bestseller in 2008, a 2008 Book Sense Pick, and Locus Recommended Reading for 2009.
