= Anti-aircraft Defences =

1940 painting by C. R. W. Nevinson

Anti -aircraft defences
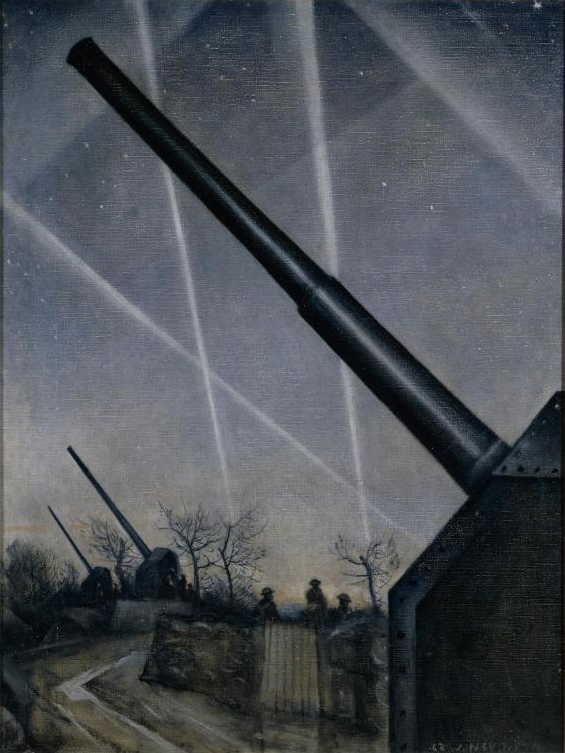
- Artist: C. R. W. Nevinson
- Year: 1940
- Medium: Oil on canvas
- Dimensions: 81.2 cm × 60.9 cm (32.0 in × 24.0 in)
- Location: Imperial War Museum; London

Anti-aircraft defences is an oil on canvas painting by the British artist C. R. W. Nevinson, from 1940. It is held in the collection of the Imperial War Museum, in London. It depicts anti-aircraft batteries and London Blitz spotlights. It was transferred to the museum in 1947 by the War Artists' Advisory Committee. Nevinson was hugely disappointed not to be offered a governmental commission for his work, and so this painting was created at a time of discord between him and Kenneth Clark.
