= Gancanagh =

Fairy in Northern Irish mythology

A gancanagh (/ɡænˈkænə/) (from Irish gean cánach 'love talker') is a male fairy from the mythology of Ireland, known for seducing women.

== Etymology ==
The name has been rendered under various spellings including geancánach or ganconer.

Sources collected from County Meath by the Irish Folklore Commission indicate that the word (pronounced gankanah or gankaneh) could also mean a small or precocious child, indicating fairylike smallness.

== Legend ==
In 1888, W. B. Yeats noted that the gancanagh was not found in dictionaries and the fairy was not well-known in Connacht.

In a story collected in The Dublin and London Magazine in 1825, ganconer is defined as "a name given to the fairies, alias the 'good people,' in the North of Ireland." They are described as little men who live in caves, led by Captain Dearg (The Red Captain). One ganconer kidnaps a human woman, and her sweetheart must win her back on Halloween night. He catches her at a crossroads, but she is caught between him and the ganconers and dies. In another story in the same magazine, a group of ganconers plays hurling, and carries off a widow’s cow to a fairyland beneath the lake of Loughleagh. The owner retrieves the cow, but the moment someone says the name of God nearby, the cow sinks into the ground never to be seen again.

According to Nicholas O’Kearney writing in 1855, the Geancanach was a little man similar to the Leprechaun, but lazier. He appeared in lonesome valleys with a dudeen, a short clay pipe which was consequently known as “the Geancanagh’s pipe.” (The dudeen was also associated with the Cluricaune, another fairy.) The Geancanagh seduced shepherdesses and milkmaids. It was considered highly unlucky to meet him, and any man who had wasted his money chasing after women was said to have met a Geancanagh.

Captain Dearg and an army of ganconers appeared in the poetry of John O’Hanlon as fairy soldiers who ride through the air. O’Hanlon identified ganconer as an alternate name for the fairies or little folk.

Irish poet Ethna Carbery characterized the “Love-Talker” as a handsome incubus-like fairy with black eyes. He has no shadow, and his approach is accompanied by a mist. He seduces maidens, leaving them to waste away and die afterwards. He is banished by the sign of the cross, but too late for the protagonist of the poem, who has already kissed him.

In one 20th-century story collected by the Irish Folklore Commission, a geancanagh stars in a leprechaun-like role. He is captured and forced to show where his gold is buried, only to trick his captor.

== In popular culture ==
- W.B. Yeats used "Ganconagh" as a pseudonym.
- In the series of books "Wicked Lovely" of Melissa Marr, two characters, Irial and Niall, are gancanaghs.
- In the series of books "The Folk of Air" of Holly Black, the characters of Liriope and her sons, Locke and Oak, are gancanaghs.

== See also ==
- Clurichaun
- Incubus
- Leanan Sidhe
- Leprechaun
- Trauco
