= Radiant Shadows =

Novel by Melissa Marr

- First edition
- Author: Melissa Marr
- Cover artist: Mark Tucker (photography)
- Language: English
- Series: Wicked Lovely
- Genre: Young adult Urban fantasy
- Publisher: HarperTeen, an imprint of HarperCollins
- Publication date: April 24, 2010
- Publication place: United States
- Media type: Print (Hardcover)
- Pages: 352
- ISBN: 978-0-0616-5922-5
- OCLC: 531600077
- Preceded by: Fragile Eternity
- Followed by: Darkest Mercy

Radiant Shadows is an Urban fantasy novel by Melissa Marr. It is set in the same universe as Marr's previous YA novels, but is not a sequel to Fragile Eternity; rather, it is a companion novel like Ink Exchange was, focusing on a different set of characters.

== Plot ==
The prologue of Radiant Shadows shows Devlin, the high court's Assassin, agreeing to shelter a spectral girl name Rae in faerie without his queen's knowledge. It then skips forward about a century, to show the high queen, Sorcha, ordering Devlin to kill a baby halfling, the child of the Gabriel, along with a warning that it should "never enter faerie".

The novel then cuts to the present day, to Ani, the halfling whose life Devlin spared, as she tries to fit in with the other hounds, but cannot, due to her father's protectiveness and her mortal blood. Devlin, meanwhile, has been told by Sorcha to stay in the mortal world to keep an eye on her son, Seth. Devlin and Ani meet at the crows nest, where she drains his energy and he leaves with a taste of her blood.

Ani is different from other hounds, due to her ability to feed on both emotions and touch, and mortal and faery. Irial, the former dark king, has been performing tests to identify what about her is different and introduce it to his court to strengthen them. This also, however, draws the attention of Devlin and Sorcha's other sister, Bananach, the essence of war. She tells Ani that she has to kill Seth and Niall, or give Bananach her blood.

Ani can do neither, and is soon found by an unclaimed steed. Ani, Devlin and the steed -which Ani names Barry, short for Barracuda- leave the state to get away from Bananach.

In Faerie, meanwhile, Rae, who is a dreamwalker, enters Sorcha's dream and gives her a way to watch Seth in the mortal world. Unfortunately, she becomes obsessed with this, and without her rulership faerie starts to dissolve. Bananach pays a visit, and starts killing members of the high court.

Scared, Rae contacts Devlin through a dream and informs him of this turn of events. Devlin and Ani return to huntsdale only to find that Bananach has killed Ani's sister Tish. Ani demands that they should then kill Bananach, "breath for breath", but Devlin informs her that neither of the twins can be killed without killing all of faerie.

Bananach later goes to stab Ani, but Irial throws himself in front of her, taking the wound that would be hers. The knife dissolves inside him, poisoning him, and Bananach says that he will not last the fortnight.

Irial tells his successor, Niall, that he "wishes he hadn't been king when they met", referring to Niall's backstory as revealed in Ink Exchange, then Ani, Devlin, Rabbit and Seth leave for faerie.

Devlin was injured in the fight, and Ani allows him to drink her blood, healing him and binding them together. With Seth returned to faerie, Sorcha awakens, and together Devlin, Ani and Rae form the shadow court to balance the high court. (This, however, leaves the dark court out of balance, this will presumably be remedied in the final book, Darkest Mercy.)

They also seal the veil between the mortal and faerie worlds so that one cannot return to the mortal world without both the High and Shadow court's help.
