= The Phoenix Files =

- Arrival, Contact, Mutation, Underground, Fallout, Doomsday
- Author: Chris Morphew
- Country: Australia
- Language: English
- Genre: Adventure; Science fiction Young adult
- Publisher: Hardie Grant/Egmont
- Published: 2009–2013
- Media type: Print (hardcover softcover

The Phoenix Files is a young adult science fiction adventure series written by Australian author Chris Morphew. The series consists of six books: Arrival, Contact, Mutation, Underground, Fallout and Doomsday, the latest being released in Australia on 1 June 2013. A US release followed on 1 July 2013. The books have been well received by critics and gained praise from authors including Michael Grant and have sold thousands of copies in Australia.

The Phoenix Files series was released in the UK from September 2011. As of 2016 the books are published in three volumes: Man in the Shadows, Blood in the Ashes and Life in the Flames.

Chris Morphew has a YouTube channel where his most popular videos are reviews of breakfast cereals.

== Plot overview ==
=== Arrival ===
Arrival is told from Luke Hunter's point of view, as he and his recently divorced mother, Emily, move into Phoenix, a town run by the hugely powerful Shackleton Cooperative. Luke discovers that, in Phoenix, they have no access to phones, the internet and or to cars. Emily is impressed; but Luke is suspicious. After they meet Peter Weir, one of the first of Phoenix's citizens and Jordan Burke, Peter's love interest who clearly does not love him back, they discover the town is plotting to wipe out the entire earth. When they discover the town's airport is shut down, Time magazine issues have been published months in advance before their release and Phoenix is trapped behind a large wall – and the outside is a barren wasteland, the protagonists discover the plot is indeed real. The final sentence in the novel reveals a ringing mobile phone in the town square.

=== Contact ===
Contact switches to Peter's point of view. After he, Jordan and Luke hear the ringing phone in the town square, Peter finds out his dad owns a phone and the employees use them to contact each other for work purposes. They also discover Peter's dad is working for Tabitha as their propaganda specialist. Further information reveals the true capacity of what Tabitha is – a biological weapon which boils one's skin clean off, and they find out there is a tunnel network connecting all of Phoenix's major facilities. Luke's mother has been caught with the town's doctor, Dr Montag doing romantic activities and Luke is furious. They talk to Officer Reeve who helped them escape the airport and gave a false account for their appearance at the wall in Arrival, into helping them get into the Shackleton Building so Luke can call his dad to tell him about Tabitha. In the building, they are caught by Noah Shackleton, the cooperative's C.E.O. He tells them Luke's dad will be tracked and killed and instead of killing them, they use an older version of Tabitha to execute Reeve and inject suppressors into the three of them so the Cooperative can track their whereabouts 24/7. If they are caught in the wrong places, they will be paralyzed from the waist down as they have now done to Peter's dad. When they leave the building, Jordan's Father runs to Dr. Montag and yells "There's something wrong with the baby!"

=== Mutation ===
Mutation comes from Jordan's point of view. She begins to notices strange occurrences happening to the people of Phoenix. Jordan is receiving visions of the past and future, Peter is spiraling out-of-control more than ever, her younger sister is reading minds, her mum's baby is growing rapidly inside and it will be due August 13 – the same day Tabitha will eradicate the world outside, and she notices the rest of Phoenix's citizens are becoming super-powered, except for Luke. Peter's old friends, Cathryn, Mike and Tank, have been disappearing each day after school and Jordan, Luke and Peter find out they have been worshiping mysterious overseers who told them they have a destiny. Soon after, when all of Phoenix has to take a blood test, Peter severely bashes Mr Hanger, one of the high school's most despised teachers. Subsequently, his suppressor is activated. After being sent to the Phoenix Medical Center, Peter is kidnapped by Cat, Mike and Tank. Luke and Jordan set out to rescue him but it backfires when they find an abandoned complex and suppressors are activated. In the complex, they are confronted by a young man and an older woman who have been tracking them their whole lives.

=== Underground ===
Underground returns to Luke's point of view. He and Jordan are interrogated by the two people they confronted at the end of Mutation. They believe Luke, Peter and Jordan are working for the Cooperative and demand to know the location of Tobias, whom they have never heard of. The interrogators' names are revealed to be Kara, whose mother established the complex they are living in and Soren, who is Kara's son. They are working to end Tabitha as Luke, Jordan and Peter are, but they still do not give each other their complete trust, despite that they deactivate their suppressors. Peter is being held by their custody as he is too dangerous to be near. Kara and Soren are soon revealed to be Cat, Mike and Tank's overseers. They are angered by the reveal and Luke's dad finally arrives in Phoenix. The people of Phoenix have been growing suspicious and reports of citizens leaving the town have gone around, although they have actually become the latest People to go under the medical center for research. A new security camera network is set up in Phoenix making it harder for the group to enter the town. Luke, Peter and Jordan tell their parents about Tabitha and reactions are mixed. Luke's mum does not believe him, whilst Jordan's and Peter's do. Jordan's mum and sister are arrested and her dad and Peter's parents join forces. Kara and Soren perform the same suppressor deactivation procedure on Peter's dad as they did with Luke, Jordan and Peter. After extensive research, a possible cause for Peter's condition has been discovered. The dense forest surrounding Phoenix was not there 25 years before and the cause of the growth of the forest could be affecting Peter. The group go to the Medical Centre as the town is sent to a mandatory meeting in the Shackleton Building and rescue Jordan's mum and Georgia, Jordan's sister. Much to Emily's dismay, Dr Montag is shot. The day after the rescue mission, it is revealed that the Shackleton Building has become a concentration camp for Phoenix's citizens and Peter's parents and Jordan's dad were caught. Luke and Jordan watch a video of themselves from decades ago where Peter stabs Luke. They are bemused and horrified to know that even if Tabitha is to be overthrown, Luke will die.

=== Fallout ===
Fallout is told from Jordan's point of view. It starts with Luke, Jordan, Reeve, Luke's dad, Kara, Soren and a girl who is extremely fast named Amy, sneaking into the weapons warehouse to get more weapons and ammo. They find helicopters and Luke's dad and Kara fly out to get someone from the outside to help. Everyone else goes back to the Vattel complex underground. Crazy Bill wakes up and starts digging, but won't tell anyone why. Peter keeps getting worse. Tank has decided that Reeve is his boss and does whatever he wants. Mike still thinks Soren is a powerful overseer and follows him around. Jordan and Luke see Mike sacrifice his life to take out the security system because Soren wanted him to. Crazy Bill tells Luke and Jordan that he is Peter and that he never made it back to the present after killing Luke. And he also says that Jordan is the portal into the past and she blew up the Vattel Complex. Luke, Jordan, Reeve, and a couple others leave to find Tobias in the Shackleton building, but can't. Shackleton doesn't seem to know who or what Tobias even is. When they get back to the complex, they find that Jordan's mom's baby has been born. He was named Abraham, after Jordan's dad, but Georgia reads the baby's mind and he tells her that his name is Tobias. The book ends with an electrified grid stretching out to the wall, completing the final lock-down procedures.

=== Doomsday ===
Doomsday is the final book of the series. This book is from an alternating point of view, from Luke, Peter, and Jordan, and even Crazy Bill. There are no more days left. After ninety-nine days of lockdown, the annihilation of the human race is right on schedule. Luke and Jordan are fighting a losing battle. Peter has escaped, Bill has disappeared, and Co-operative Security are moments away from storming the Vattel Complex. As the battle rages on in town, an offer of help arrives from the last place anyone could have expected (Calvin). But can it really be trusted, or is this just another one of Shackleton's deceptions? And with the murder still looming over Luke, will he even live long enough to find out? One way or another, it's all coming to an end. The clock is still ticking. There are seventeen hours until the end of the world.

== Main characters ==
- Luke Hunter is the main protagonist of the series and he and his mother are the instigator of the Shackleton Cooperative's countdown to the end of the world. Luke is not supposed to be in Phoenix, as it is revealed later in the series. He is in Phoenix because Crazy Bill hacked into the computer so that Luke and his Mum would move to Phoenix so that he would meet Jordan, in order for Bill to teleport back to the past.
- Peter Weir/Crazy Bill is Luke's friend and is hopelessly in love with Jordan, who does not love him back. He slowly becomes more erratic each book until he becomes uncontrollable abusing his telekinetic powers. After being stuck far in the past, he manipulates the course of events that lead Luke to Phoenix, and becomes known as 'Crazy Bill.'
- Jordan Burke is Luke's and Peter's acquaintance and is Peter's love interest. She is fierce, headstrong and independent. Jordan often receives visions of the past and future and is the glue of the group.
- Cathryn Hawking along with Martin "Tank" Roper and Michael Foreman were among the first of Phoenix's citizens along with Peter and they soon abandoned him when the next wave of citizens came in.
- Noah Shackleton is the C.E.O of the Shackleton Cooperative, who are planning to wipe out the human race outside Phoenix. He is super-powerful and is seen to be smart and dangerous.
- Officer Bruce Calvin is the chief of the security force in Phoenix, who serve in place of police. He is feared by Luke, Jordan and Peter and they see him as a major threat.
- Officer Matthew Reeve is one of few security officers in Phoenix on Luke, Peter and Jordan's side. For this reason he is killed in Contact. He is found alive in Underground.
- Dr Robert Montag is the main doctor in Phoenix who starts to date Emily much to Luke's disgust. He is the one who injects the suppressors into him, Jordan and Peter in Contact and he is shot in Underground.
- Emily Hunter is Luke's mother who moves to Phoenix and ships Luke with her. She is terrible at accepting bad news and wants at all costs to move on without her husband. She also ends up dating Dr. Montag.
- Jack Hunter is Luke's father. He first makes his appearance in Underground after going through a series of complications to reach Phoenix after the events of Contact.
- Kara Vattel, along with Soren, her son, are the only employees left at the Vattel Complex which Kara established. They initially believe Luke, Peter and Jordan to be working for Shackleton.

== Inspiration and themes ==
Chris Morphew identifies himself as a Christian, but does not believe in sugarcoating the state of our world in his writing. In discussing the decision, within this context, to write primarily teenage protagonists, he said:

This idea of these fractured worlds, these broken worlds; I think that [in] the era that this generation of kids are growing up in, there's this real culture of fear, this culture of — You know, you turn on the news and there's gunfire and there's wars and ... the world, I think, to a child can feel like a very unsafe place. And to be able to engage with a story that lets that loom large and gives them characters they can identify with, that are grappling these things and emerging as heroes in these contexts — I wonder whether there's something in that. I think we can all identify with a world that's broken, a world where things aren't as they should be and so ... that is what really resonated with [me] ... This world that was very much broken and relationships [that were] broken. And I think, just as human beings, we can inhabit that.

== Critical reception ==
The series has been largely well received. HorrorScope described Arrival as "a well-written thriller sure to intrigue readers and keep them turning pages then waiting impatiently for the next installment". Horrorscope.com.au praised the way Morphew captured teenage essence in Mutation writing: "..he is particularly skilled at capturing the teens’ voices and balancing the usual problems of the three protagonists as they deal with burgeoning romances with the greater problems of their world." Boomerang Books praised the pacing in Underground stating: "Where other series spend the first few chapters of each book explaining past events, Underground launches into the action of the story."
