= Top Combine =

Chinese boy band

- Born: Shanghai, China
- Occupations: Singers, dancers, actors
- Years active: 2007-present
- Awards: See Awards

Chinese name
- Traditional Chinese: 至上勵合
- Simplified Chinese: 至上励合
Transcriptions
Standard Mandarin
- Hanyu Pinyin: Zhì Shàng Lì Hé
- Musical career
- Also known as: TC
- Origin: Shanghai, China
- Genres: Mandopop, dance-pop
- Labels: Record Label(s): DoReMi Media (2007–present); Manage Label(s): EE-Media (2007–present)
- Members: Bird; Mars; Kenny; Tanas
- Past members: Caesar
- Website: []

Top Combine is a Mandopop boy band. The group formed in 2007 with the members Bird Zhang, Mars Ma, Kenny Liu, Caesar Li, and Tanas Kim. All were professionally trained in singing, dancing, modeling, and language. With the exception of Tanas, the other four members were all contestants of the 2007 Super Boy, the male counterpart of Super Girl. Top Combine officially debuted in October 2008 with a performance of their first single "Arrival". In 2012, Caesar left to pursue an acting career, and the five-member group turned into a quartet.

== Musical career ==
=== 2007: The Super Boy competition and formation ===
Due to the success of the predecessor Super Girl, Hunan TV and record label EE Media decided to produce a male counterpart of the contest. Deemed China's version of American Idol, Super Boy's first broadcast was on May 25, 2007. Zhang Yuan, representing Nanjing, placed ninth in the contest overall, successfully entering the top ten of the finalists round. Although Li Mao of Nanjing, Ma Xueyang of Chengdu, Liu Zhoucheng of Guangzhou, and Gao Wei of Changsha were all eliminated before the final round, it had already been proposed by EE Media for these four contestants to unite as one vocal group. Contestant Yang Fan of Jinan was to join the group as well, but was soon removed from the group. After a few test recordings with the four potential members, EE Media signed them to record contracts, temporarily being added to a group named "Happy Boy Group". Originally, finalist Zhang Yuan was to debut in a thirteen-member vocal touring group called "Happy Top 13", along with the other top thirteen finalists of Super Boy. However, the plan sounded tedious and hence was discarded. Instead, Zhang Yuan was placed as the fifth and last member of the "Happy Boy Group". That same month, the five of them recorded their pre-debut single "Kiss", and performed it at the Super Boy concert in Shanghai.

With the support of South Korea's DoReMi Media, the group was sent to South Korea in October 2007 to undergo vigorous vocal and dance training. It was rumored that EE Media would replace a member from the "Happy Boy Group" with a Korean member, hoping for the group to make a future debut in Korea. For a while, the Chinese media speculated that Zhang Yuan was to be replaced due to his late addition to the group in September 2007. In early 2008, EE Media announced that the rumors of a line-up change were true, and Gao Wei was to be replaced with an anonymous member.

The "Happy Boy Group" returned to China in April 2008 with the announcement of the new member Kim Eun-sung, a Korean trainee under DoRreMi Media who had replaced Gao Wei. The mysterious addition of Kim caused the Chinese media to assume that they were trying to compete against Super Junior-M, causing Korean fans to label Kim as the Korean version of Han Geng. However, EE Media claims that Kim was added to the group due to his special voice and the bond he had formed with the existing members. The addition of Kim in the group caused the group's popularity to rise in Korea, even accepting interviews from Korea's KBS channel.

Right before they recorded their debut single, the group decided on the name Zhi Shang Li He (Chinese: 至上励合), literally meaning "supreme combination". The group's English name was finalized to Top Combine and the members also chose English stage names for themselves. Zhang Yuan became Bird, Li Mao became Caesar, Ma Xueyang became Mars, Liu Zhoucheng became Kenny, and Kim Eun-sung became Tanas. Nonetheless, all five members kept the characters of their birth names as their Chinese stage names. Jin Ensheng, the Chinese counterpart to Kim Eun-sung's name in hanja, became his Chinese stage name.

=== 2008: Arrival debut and initial success ===
Promoted as "China's Number One Motivational Boy Band" (Chinese: 中国第一励志天团), Top Combine's debut was both successful and controversial. The group's first single "Arrival" (降临) made its debut global broadcast in Music Radio: China's Top 10 Charts on September 8, 2008, just six days after their official debut. The single peaked at #3 on the charts. While the single was received with much success, the release of the single's corresponding music video on September 20, 2008 earned some ire the first few months of their debut. The color, style, and material seen in "Arrival" is similar to that of the "O" and "Purple Line" music videos by Korean boy band TVXQ. Top Combine were henceforth labeled as copiers by TVXQ fans. Later, it was clarified that the reasons for their similarities were because the two groups used the same director, Chun Hyuk-jin.

On October 9, 2008, Top Combine officially debuted on the program Up Every Day (Chinese: 天天向上), performing "Arrival". Their debut EP, Arrival, was released in different provinces of China starting from October 26, 2008. The EP sold very well in China, and the group held their first fan meeting with their fan club "Seraphim" (Chinese: 至天使) on November 16, 2008.

The music video of "Cotton Candy", the group's second promotional single, was released in early December 2008. "Cotton Candy" was an original creation by Mars, who composed the piece with his electric guitar and violin and also penned the lyrics. The single charted within the top ten of over five different music charts, peaking at #2, and achieving more popularity than their first single. In the following year, "Cotton Candy" won one of the Song of the Year Awards at Music Radio China's "Pop Music Ceremony" in Beijing.

Top Combine was invited to perform the opening act of the Southeast Explosive Music Awards on November 15, 2008. On November 17, they received their first award at the 9+2 Music Awards.

=== 2009–2011: Grandness Equal to Heaven, first concert, and Lucky Boys ===
On December 13, 2009, Top Combine released their second record Grandness Equal to Heaven (Chinese: 齐天大盛), the name of which is a pun on the name "Great Sage Equal to Heaven" (Chinese: 齐天大圣). The album, which is their only full-studio release to date, displayed a blend of Chinese classical instruments and Western rhythms. Four of the songs on the album were composed by Mars, and the other four group members contributed to the lyrics for another song each.

In September 2010, Top Combine traveled to the United States to receive training and to record two singles with American producer Nicholas Cooper for their third studio release, Lucky Boys. While there, the group made an appearance on Los Angeles TV station KTLA's Morning Show, becoming the first Chinese musicians, and the second Chinese artiste after Jackie Chan, to be invited to the show. Their appearance happened to be preceded by a speech from United States president Barack Obama, which caused the live broadcast of Top Combine's performance of "This I Promise You" to be delayed 20 minutes.

After revealing two of their singles on Up Every Day (Chinese: 天天向上) in December 2010, Top Combine held their first ever concert. The "Spotlight" (Chinese: 主角) Concert was named after their recently released single and was held in the Century Theatre (Chinese: 世纪剧院) in Beijing on December 18, 2010.

On April 28, 2011, Top Combine released Lucky Boys, which contained the two songs they had recorded in America at Westlake Recording Studios, as well as three other songs. As with their first album release, Mars composed one of the singles for Lucky Boys.

=== 2012: Caesar's departure, Luck, You Are Here ===
In June 2012, rumors began to spread that Caesar had left Top Combine, due to a promotional poster that featured the other four members without Caesar. At the time Caesar was heavily involved in stage acting and other events, and so was not with the other group members as often. Top Combine's manager refuted any rumors that the group would disband, explaining that Caesar did not appear on the poster because he would not be able to attend the concert that the poster was promoting.

On September 20, 2012, Caesar announced that he would be leaving Top Combine to pursue a solo career in acting. The decision was made after much consideration with his group members and with his company. The other four members expressed their support of his decision on their Weibo accounts. There are no plans to find a new member to replace Caesar.

On October 29, 2012, Top Combine released their fourth record, Luck, You Are Here (Chinese: 还好有你在), their first album after Caesar's departure. The EP was described as their first work in which they pulled away from the Korean and Japanese pop influences that had characterized their previous music, thus allowing them to exhibit a more local and creative quality. The five songs on the album were all composed by Mars, and one of the songs was used as the theme song for Banana Boy (Chinese: 成人记), a TV drama in which Caesar acted that began airing in November 2012.

== Members ==
=== Current ===
Bird

- Birth name: Zhang Yuan (simplified Chinese: 张远; traditional Chinese: 張遠; pinyin: Zhāng Yuǎn)
- Date of birth: June 2, 1985 (age 41)
- Place of birth: Chuzhou, Anhui, China
- Position: Leader, Rapper, Main Vocalist

Mars

- Birth name: Ma Xueyang (simplified Chinese: 马雪阳; traditional Chinese: 馬雪陽; pinyin: Mǎ Xuěyáng)
- Date of birth: September 30, 1986 (age 39)
- Place of birth: Chengdu, Sichuan, China
- Position: Lead Rapper, Vocalist

Kenny

- Birth name: Liu Zhoucheng (traditional Chinese: 劉洲成; simplified Chinese: 刘洲成; pinyin: Liú Zhōuchéng; Cantonese Yale: Lau4 Jau1sing4)
- Date of birth: February 28, 1988 (age 38)
- Place of birth: Zhongshan, Guangdong, China
- Position: Vocalist
- Created his own brand Baby Amelie.
- On September 9, 2016, Kenny celebrated his one year marriage anniversary with his Chinese-Canadian wife Miu Viki. It was announced via Weibo. The couple currently has two daughters.

Tanas

- Name: Jin Ensheng (simplified Chinese: 金恩圣; traditional Chinese: 金恩聖; pinyin: Jīn Ēnshèng)
- Birth name: Kim Eun-sung (Hangul: 김은성)
- Date of birth: September 17, 1988 (age 37)
- Place of birth: South Korea
- Position: Vocalist, Main Dancer

=== Former ===
Caesar

- Birth name: Li Mao (Chinese: 李茂; pinyin: Lǐ Mào)
- Date of birth: June 2, 1986 (age 40)
- Place of birth: Hefei, Anhui, China
- Position: Lead Dancer, Main Rapper, Vocalist

== Discography ==
=== Albums ===
Album Information	Track listing
Arrival (EP): Released: October 26, 2008; Format: CD; Label: EE Media, Doremi Media	Track listing: 1. Arrival (Jiànglín / 降临); 2. Cotton Candy (Miánhuā Táng / 棉花糖); 3. Next Stop, Forever (Xià Yí Zhàn Yǒngyuǎn / 下一站永远); 4. Clown (Xiǎochǒu / 小丑); 5. Kiss
Grandness Equal to Heaven: Released: December 13, 2009; Format: CD; Label: EE Media, Doremi Media	Track listing: 1. Grandness Equal To Heaven (Qí Tiān Dà Shèng / 齐天大盛); 2. Star-Studded Sky (Fánxīng / 繁星); 3. Radiance (Guāngmáng / 光芒); 4. Love Live; 5. Sweetheart (Tiánxīn / 甜心); 6. Summit of Longing (Sīniàn Zhī Diān / 思念之巅); 7. Goodbye My Love (Zàijiànle Wǒ de Ài / 再见了我的爱); 8. Party Time; 9. Child Who Speaks With The Wind (Héfēng Shuōhuà de Háizi / 和风说话的孩子); 10. End The Fight (Jìn Zhàn / 禁战)
Lucky Boys (EP): Released: April 28, 2011; Format: CD; Label: EE Media, Doremi Media	Track listing: 1. Lucky Boys; 2. 咬耳朵 (Yǎo'ěrduo); 3. Darling; 4. 主角 (Zhǔjiǎo); 5. 在路上 (Zài Lùshàng)
Luck, You Are Here (EP): Released: October 29, 2012; Format: CD; Label: EE Media, Doremi Media	Track listing: 1. 还好有你在 (Hái Hǎo Yǒu Nǐ Zài); 2. 还在 (Hái Zài); 3. 那群傻瓜 (Nà Qún Shǎguā); 4. 出言不逊 (Chūyánbùxùn); 5. 关于结束 (Guānyú Jiéshù)

=== Solos ===
- Bird Zhang - "City of Sadness"
  - Release Date: May 29, 2007

=== Other Units ===
E.E. Media Stars - 红星闪闪 (Hong Xing Shan Shan/"Red Star Glimmering")
Release Date: July 2009

E.E. Media Stars - OPEN新年 (OPEN Xin Nian/"OPEN New Year")
Release Date: December 2008

Super Boys (feat. Bird/Zhang Yuan) - 我最闪亮 (Wo Zui Shan Liang/"I'm The Brightest")
Release Date: September 2007

== Awards ==
Year	Awards
2008	Best Dance Group, 9+2 Music Awards; Most Popular Group Online, 9+2 Music Awards; Most Popular Newcomer Band, 9+2 Music Awards
2009	Golden Hit 2008, Beijing Pop Music Awards: "Cotton Candy"; Baidu Most Searched New Group Award
