= C. R. W. Nevinson =

English painter (1889–1946)

C. R. W. Nevinson ARA
- 1935 portrait of Nevinson by Howard Coster
- Born: Christopher Richard Wynne Nevinson; 13 August 1889; Hampstead, London, England
- Died: 7 October 1946 (aged 57); Hampstead, London, England
- Education: St John's Wood School of Art; Slade School of Art; Académie Julian
- Military career
- Branch: Royal Army Medical Corps; Department of Information; Ministry of Information; Royal Air Force
- Units: Friends' Ambulance Unit; Wellington House; British War Memorials Committee; War Artists' Advisory Committee
- Conflicts: World War I; World War II

Christopher Richard Wynne Nevinson ARA (13 August 1889 – 7 October 1946) was an English figure and landscape painter, etcher and lithographer, who was one of the most famous war artists of the First World War. He is often referred to by his initials C. R. W. Nevinson, and was also known as Richard.

Nevinson studied at the Slade School of Art under Henry Tonks and alongside Stanley Spencer and Mark Gertler. When he left the Slade, Nevinson befriended F.T. Marinetti, the founder of Italian Futurism, and the radical writer and artist Wyndham Lewis, who founded the short-lived Rebel Art Centre. However, Nevinson fell out with Lewis and the other 'rebel' artists when he attached their names to the Futurist movement. Lewis immediately founded the Vorticists, an avant garde group of artists and writers from which Nevinson was excluded.

At the outbreak of the First World War, Nevinson joined the Friends' Ambulance Unit and was deeply disturbed by his work tending wounded French and British soldiers. For a very brief period he served as a volunteer ambulance driver before ill health forced his return to Britain. Subsequently, Nevinson volunteered for home service with the Royal Army Medical Corps. He used these experiences as the subject matter for a series of powerful paintings which used the machine aesthetic of Futurism and the influence of Cubism to great effect. His fellow artist Walter Sickert wrote at the time that Nevinson's painting La Mitrailleuse, 'will probably remain the most authoritative and concentrated utterance on the war in the history of painting.' In 1917, Nevinson was appointed an official war artist, but he was no longer finding Modernist styles adequate for describing the horrors of modern war, and he increasingly painted in a more realistic manner. Nevinson's later World War One paintings, based on short visits to the Western Front, lacked the same powerful effect as those earlier works which had helped to make him one of the most famous young artists working in England.

Shortly after the end of the war, Nevinson travelled to the United States of America, where he painted a number of powerful images of New York. However, his boasting and exaggerated claims of his war experiences, together with his depressive and temperamental personality, made him many enemies in both the US and Britain. In 1920, the critic Charles Lewis Hind wrote of Nevinson that 'It is something, at the age of thirty one, to be among the most discussed, most successful, most promising, most admired and most hated British artists.' His post-war career, however, was not so distinguished. Nevinson's 1937 memoir Paint and Prejudice, although lively and colourful, is in parts inaccurate, inconsistent, and misleading.

== Biography ==
=== Early life ===
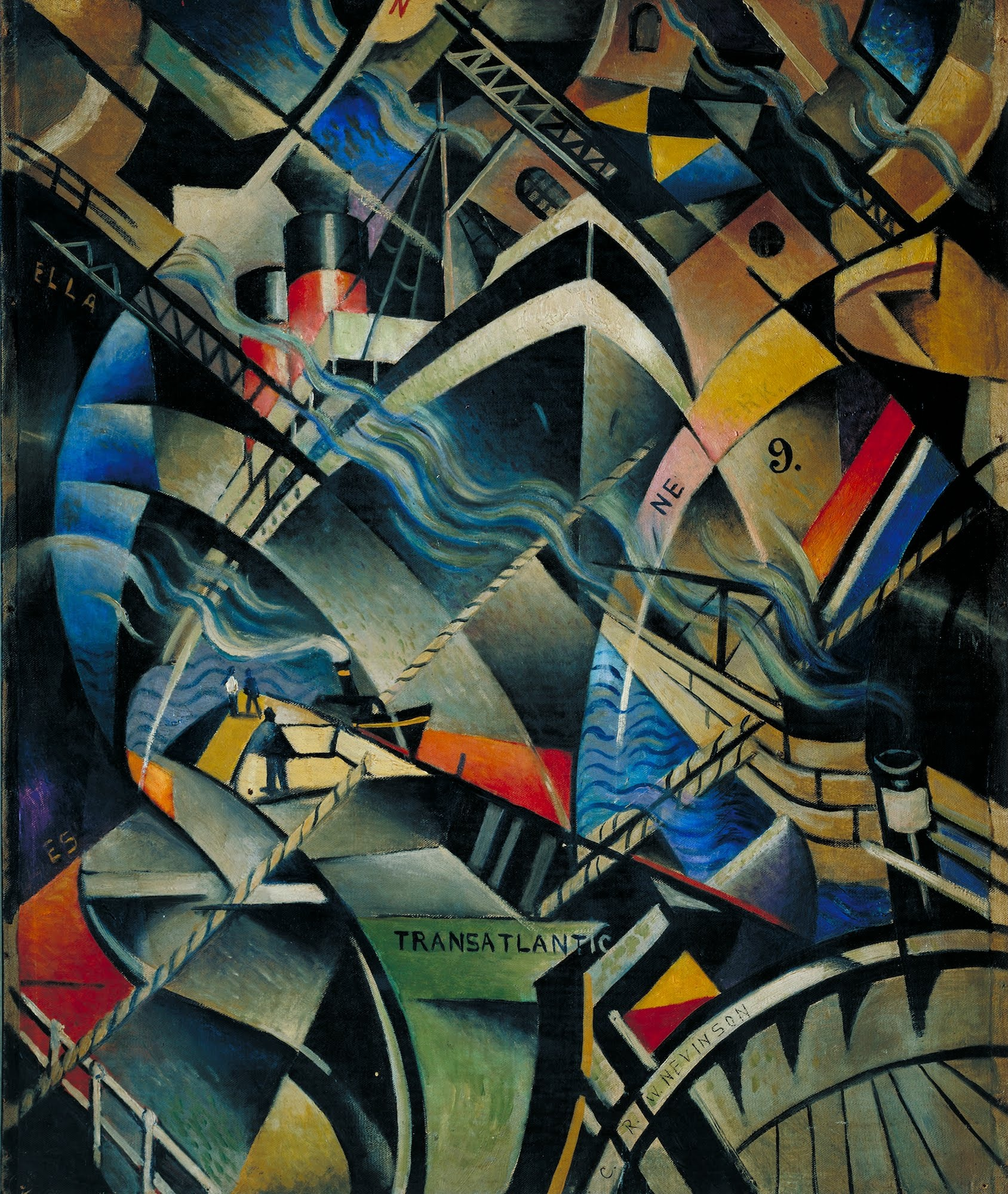
The Arrival, 1913

Christopher Richard Wynne Nevinson was born in Hampstead, one of the two children, and the only son, of the war correspondent and journalist Henry Nevinson and the suffrage campaigner and writer Margaret Nevinson. He was always known as Richard to his friends. Educated at Shrewsbury and Uppingham, which he hated, Nevinson went on to study at the St John's Wood School of Art. Inspired by seeing the work of Augustus John, he decided to attend the Slade School of Art, part of University College London. There his contemporaries included Mark Gertler, Stanley Spencer, Paul Nash, Maxwell Gordon Lightfoot, Adrian Allinson and Dora Carrington. Gertler was, for a time, his closest friend and influence, and they formed for a short while a group known as the Neo-Primitives, being deeply influenced by the art of the early Renaissance. Gertler and Nevinson subsequently fell out when they both fell in love with Carrington. Whilst at the Slade, Nevinson was advised by the Professor of Drawing, Henry Tonks, to abandon thoughts of an artistic career. This led to a lifelong bitterness between the two, and frequent accusations by Nevinson, who had something of a persecution complex, that Tonks was behind several imagined conspiracies against him.

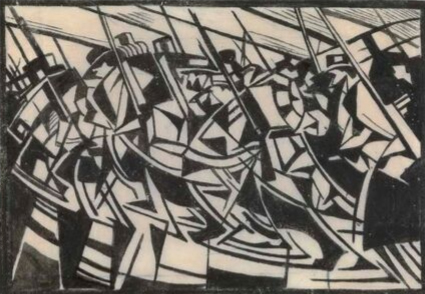
Study for Returning to the Trenches, drawn between 1914 and 1915.

After leaving the Slade, Nevinson studied at the Academie Julian in Paris throughout 1912 and 1913 and also attended the Cercle Russe. In Paris, he met Vladimir Lenin and Pablo Picasso, shared a studio with Amedeo Modigliani, became acquainted with Cubism and also met the Italian Futurists Marinetti and Gino Severini. Back in London he became friends with the radical writer and artist Wyndham Lewis. When Wyndham Lewis founded the short-lived Rebel Art Centre, which included Edward Wadsworth and Ezra Pound, Nevinson also joined. In March 1914 he was among the founder members of the London Group. In June 1914 he published, in several British newspapers, with Marinetti, a manifesto for English Futurism called Vital English Art. Vital English Art denounced the "passéiste filth" of the London art scene, declared Futurism as the only way of representing the modern, machine age and proclaimed its role in the vanguard of British art. Lewis was offended that Nevinson had attached the name of the Rebel Arts Centre to the manifesto without asking him or anyone else in the group. Lewis immediately founded the Vorticists, an avant garde group of artists and writers from which Nevinson was excluded, though he devised the title for the Vorticists' magazine, BLAST.

=== World War One ===
==== Medical orderly ====
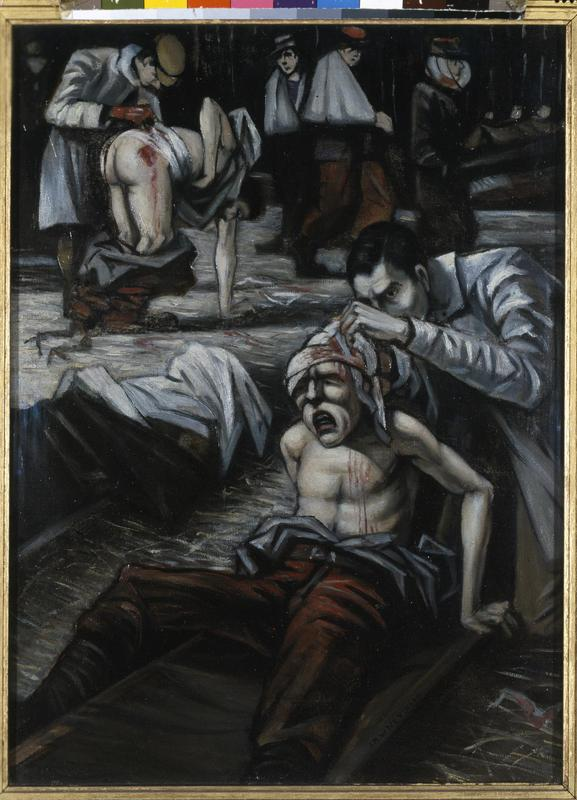
The Doctor (1916) (Art.IWM ART 725)

At the outbreak of World War I, Nevinson joined the Friends' Ambulance Unit, which his father had helped to found. From 13 November 1914, Nevinson spent nine weeks in France with the FAU and the British Red Cross Society, mostly working at a disused goods shed by Dunkirk rail station known as the Shambles. The Shambles housed some three thousand badly wounded French troops, who had been evacuated from the Front and then all but abandoned. For weeks they had been left unfed and untended with the dead and dying lying together on dirty straw. Nevinson, alongside his father and other volunteers, worked to dress wounds, help clean and disinfect the shed and started to make it habitable. Nevinson later depicted his experiences in The Shambles in two paintings, The Doctor and La Patrie. As the French authorities began to take control of the situation, Nevinson was reassigned as an ambulance driver. Although Nevinson would often make much of this time as an ambulance driver, particularly in his publicity material, he only held the role for a week as, due to his poor health, he lacked the strength to steer the vehicle. By January 1915 his worsening rheumatism had made him unfit for further service and he returned to Britain.

Nevinson had four pictures included in the Second Exhibition of the London Group held in March 1915. Nevinson's Futurist painting Returning to the Trenches and the sculpture The Rock Drill by Jacob Epstein received the most attention and greatest praise in reviews of the show. After his father received assurances that he would not be posted abroad, Nevinson enlisted as a private in the Royal Army Medical Corps and spent the rest of 1915 working at the Third London General Hospital in Wandsworth. Despite its name, the 3rd LGH was a specialist centre for the treatment of both shell shock and severe facial injuries. Nevinson worked there as an orderly and as a labourer helping build roads and fit out new wards. Sometimes he would be sent to Charing Cross to meet, and unload, the hospital trains arriving from France and for a while he worked on a ward for mental patients. Nevinson married Kathleen Knowlman on 1 November 1915 at Hampstead Town Hall and, after a week-long honeymoon, he reported back to the RAMC but was invalided out of the service in January 1916 with acute rheumatic fever.

==== 1916 ====
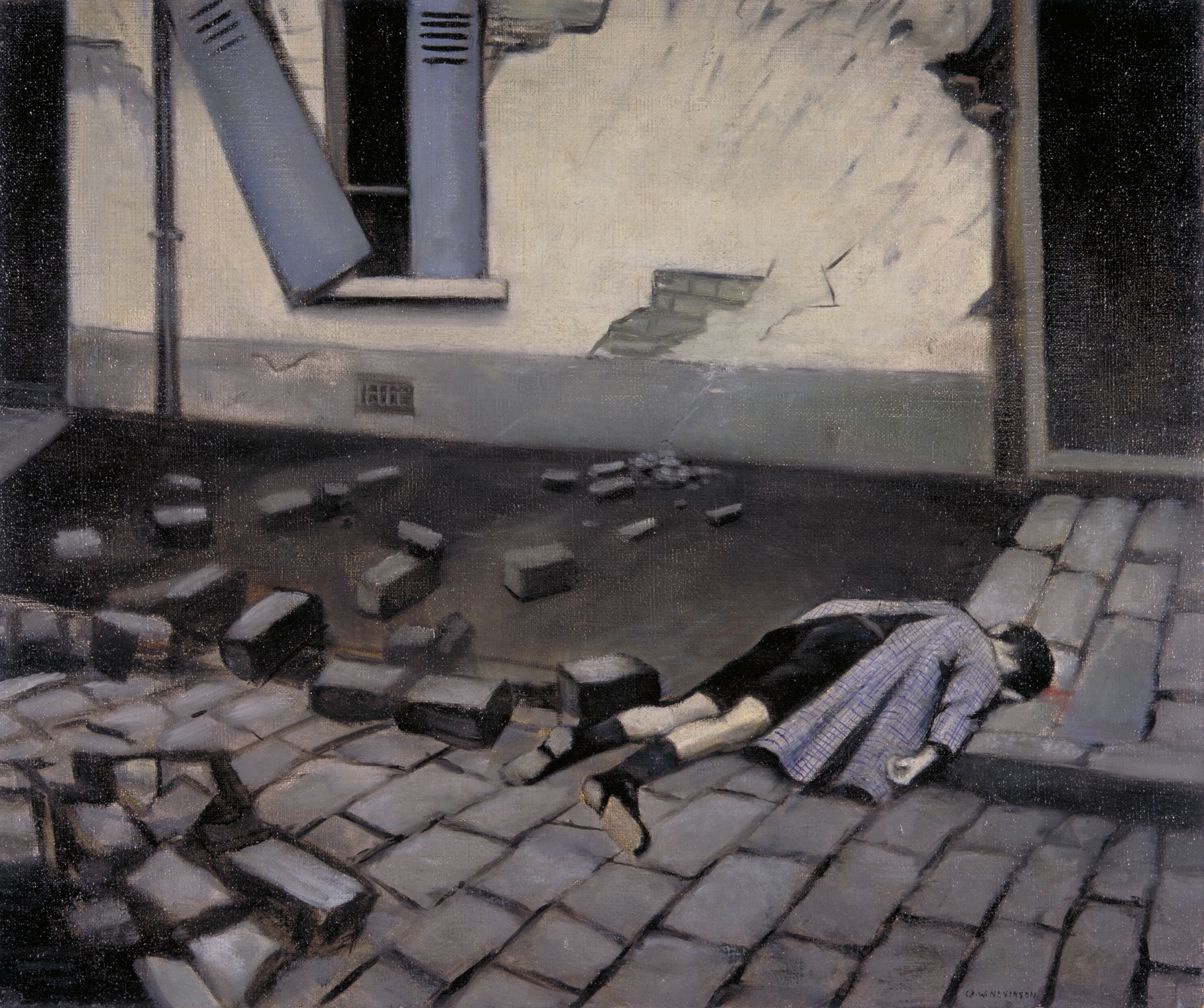
A Taube (1916) (Art.IWM ART 200)

Nevinson used his experiences in France and at the London General Hospital as the subject matter for a series of powerful paintings which used Futurist and Cubist techniques, as well as more realistic depictions, to great effect. In March 1916 he exhibited his painting La Mitrailleuse with the Allied Artists Association at the Grafton Galleries. The artist Walter Sickert wrote at the time that La Mitrailleuse 'will probably remain the most authoritative and concentrated utterance on the war in the history of painting.'

The reaction to La Mitrailleuse prompted the Leicester Galleries to offer Nevinson a one-man show which was held in October 1916. The show was a critical and popular success and the works displayed all sold. Michael Sadler bought three paintings, Arnold Bennett bought La Patrie and Sir Alfred Mond bought A Taube which showed a child killed in Dunkirk by a bomb thrown from a type of German plane known as a Taube. Several famous writers and politicians visited the exhibition; it received extensive press coverage and Nevinson became something of a celebrity.

==== Official war artist ====
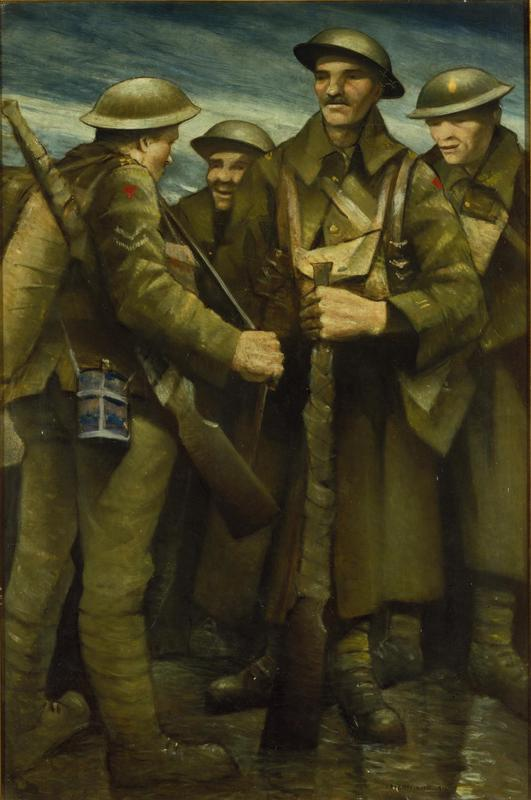
A Group of Soldiers (1917) (Art.IWM ART 520)

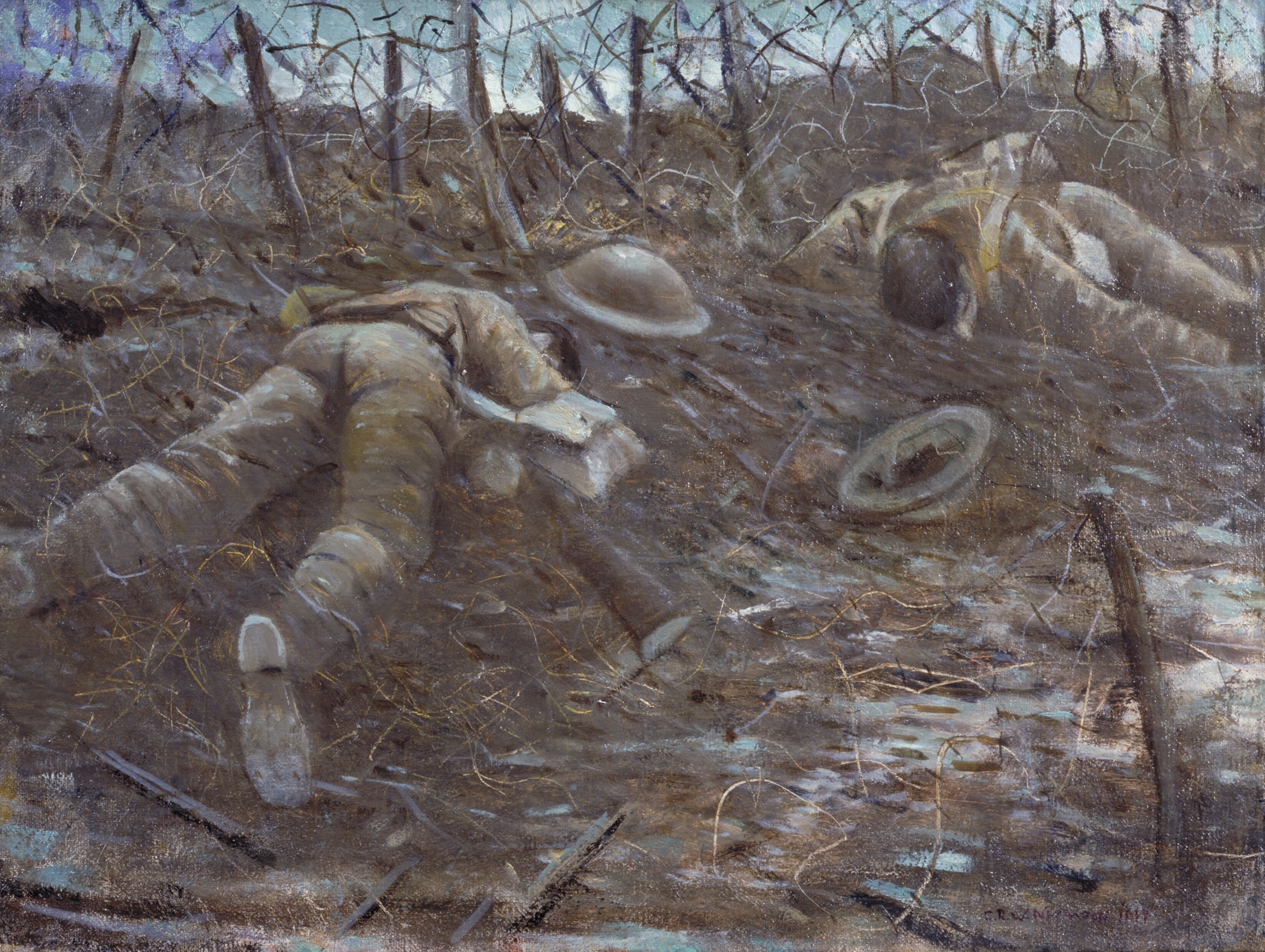
Paths of Glory (1917) (Art.IWM ART 518)

In April 1917, with the support of Muirhead Bone and his own father, Nevinson was appointed an official war artist by the Department of Information. Wearing the uniform of a war correspondent, he visited the Western Front from 5 July to 4 August 1917, a period which included the start of the Battle of Passchendaele on 31 July. Nevinson was billeted with other visitors in the Château d'Harcourt, south of Caen. Although life at the Chateau allowed Nevinson to demonstrate his cocktail making skills to the other visitors, he soon transferred to the 4th Infantry Division near Arras. From there he moved widely along the Front, visiting forward observation posts and artillery batteries. He flew with the Royal Flying Corps and came under anti-aircraft fire. He spent a night in an observation balloon above the Somme. Making his way to a forward post one day he was pinned down by enemy fire for an hour. An unauthorised visit to the Ypres Salient earned Nevinson a reprimand and added to his reputation for recklessness.

When he returned to London in August 1917, Nevinson first completed six lithographs on the subject of Building Aircraft for the War Propaganda Bureau portfolio of pictures, Britain's Efforts and Ideals, and then spent seven months in his Hampstead studio working up his sketches from the Front into finished pieces. A number of officials from the Department of Information visited the studio and soon began complaining about these new works. Nevinson was now focused on individuals, either as people displaying heroic qualities or as victims of warfare. He did this by painting in a realistic manner using a limited colour palette, sometimes only mud-brown or khaki. Whereas for his 1916 exhibition Nevinson had displayed both realistic works and pieces using Cubist and Futurist techniques, for his 1918 exhibition all the works were realistic in style and composition.

Not only did the Department of Information art advisors consider these new works dull, but the War Office censors also objected to three of the paintings. Nevinson was quite happy to reverse the direction of traffic in the painting The Road from Arras to Bapaume but was not prepared to compromise over the other two paintings. The censor objected to A Group of Soldiers on the grounds that "the type of man represented is not worthy of the British Army". Amid the sarcasm and vitriol of Nevinson's response, he did make the point that the soldiers in the painting were sketched from a group home on leave from the Front that he had encountered on the London Underground. The canvas was eventually passed for display. Not so Paths of Glory, Nevinson's painting of two fallen British soldiers in a field of mud and barbed wire. Told at the beginning of 1918 that the painting would not be passed for exhibition Nevinson insisted on displaying it with a brown strip of paper across it, with the word 'Censored' scrawled on it. This earned Nevinson a reprimand not just for displaying the painting but using the word 'Censored' without authorisation.

==== Hall of Remembrance Commission ====
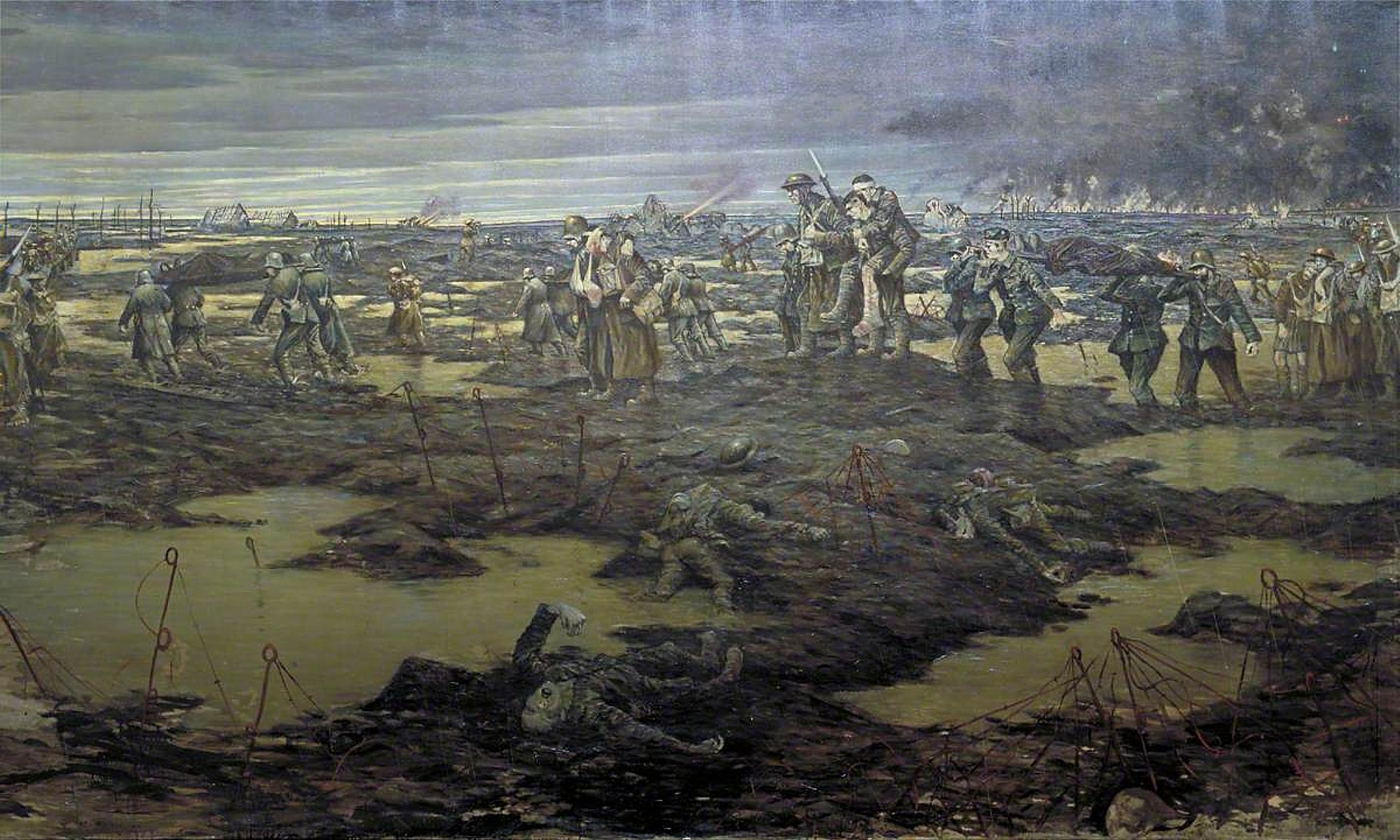
The Harvest of Battle (1918) (Art.IWM ART 1921)

In 1918, after some negotiation, Nevinson agreed to work for the British War Memorials Committee to produce a single large artwork for a proposed, but never built, Hall of Remembrance. He was offered an honorary commission as a Second Lieutenant but refused, fearing it would prejudice his medical exemption from combat duties. A short visit over a long weekend to the Western Front was arranged but without a commission Nevinson had to be accompanied wherever he went and his movements were restricted. Nevinson quickly fell out with the Army minder assigned to him in France, and claimed he was refused permission to visit the casualty stations he wanted to sketch in.

While on the trip, he did sketch a line of walking wounded, and some prisoners making their way to the rear from an early morning offensive. This became the basis of the painting The Harvest of Battle which was the largest single work Nevinson painted. It was completed in February 1919 and Nevinson arranged a 'private view' of the painting in his studio on 2 April for numerous critics and journalists. Whilst this produced some favourable reviews, notably in the Daily Express, it also led to articles claiming that the painting was so grim that it was being withheld from the public. When the painting was shown at the huge The Nation's War Paintings and Drawings exhibition organised by the Imperial War Museum in December 1919 at Burlington House Nevinson was furious to find it had not been hung in the main room but rather in a side gallery. He began a campaign of vilification against all those he held responsible for this insult. Unreasonable as Nevinsons' outrage was it did have consequences; it destroyed his friendship with Muirhead Bone, who had been on the organising committee for the exhibition, made the Imperial War Museum wary of dealing with him, and blinded Nevinson himself to the high esteem in which his war paintings were held.

=== Post-war career ===
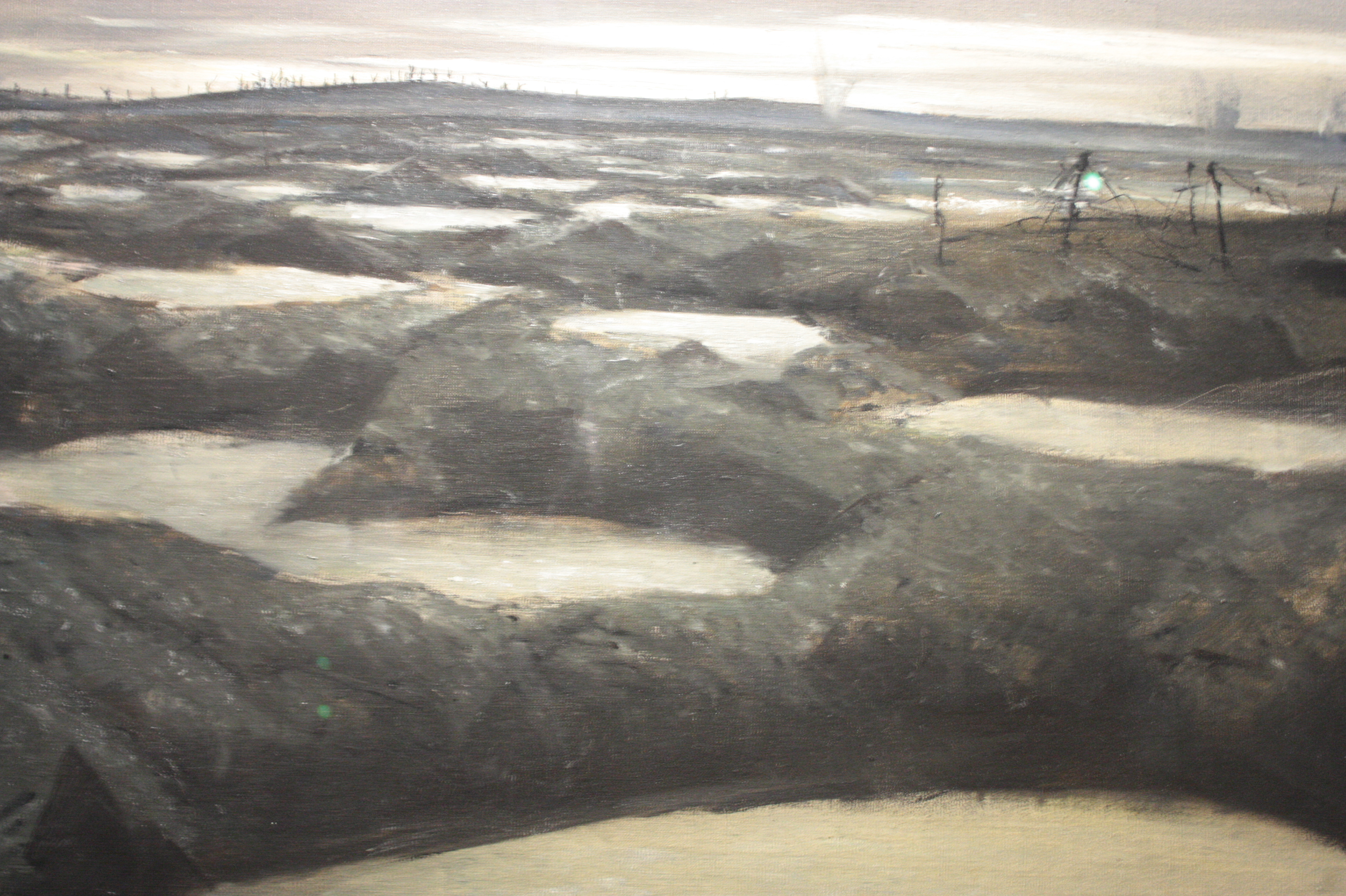
After The Push (1917) (Art.IWM ART 519)

Nevinson, alongside Edward Elgar and H. G. Wells represented British culture at the celebrations of the first anniversary of the Republic of Czechoslovakia in Prague in 1919. Nevinson first visited New York in May 1919 and spent a month there while his World War One prints were being shown, to great acclaim, at the Frederick Keppel & Co gallery. A second exhibition at the same venue in October 1920 was poorly received. This led to Nevinson becoming disillusioned with New York, to the extent he changed the name of his painting New York-an abstraction to The Soul of the Soulless City. Nevinson claimed to have been the first artist to depict New York in a modernist style but in fact several British avant-garde artists had painted in the city before World War One. In May 1919, while Nevinson was in America, Kathleen Nevinson gave birth to a baby son, but the child died shortly later and before his father could return to Britain.

Nevinson's boasting and exaggerated claims concerning his war experiences, together with his depressive and temperamental personality, made him many enemies in both the US and Britain. Roger Fry of the Bloomsbury Group was a particularly virulent critic. In 1920, the critic Charles Lewis Hind observed in his catalogue introduction to an exhibition of Nevinson's recent work: 'It is something, at the age of thirty one, to be among the most discussed, most successful, most promising, most admired and most hated British artists.' In September 1920, Nevinson designed a poster for a production, by Viola Tree, of The Unknown by Somerset Maugham which showed bombs exploding around a crucifix. The image was deemed to be offensive and was banned from display on the London Underground. Nevinson distributed the poster outside the theatre and gained a great deal of press coverage in the process.

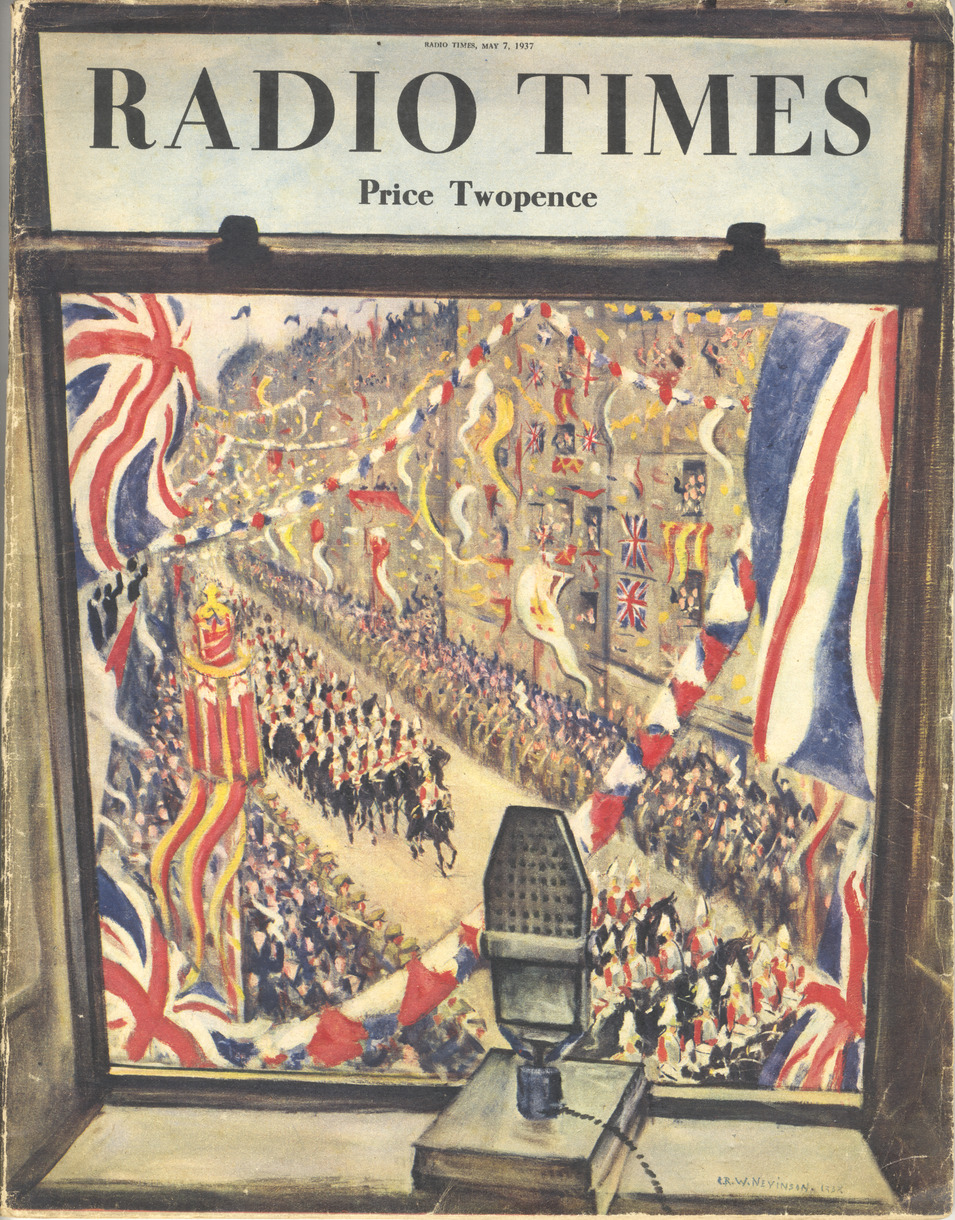
Cover of the 7 May 1937 edition of Radio Times, marking the coronation of King George VI and Queen Elizabeth

Throughout the 1930s Nevinson painted a number of cityscapes in London, Paris and New York which were generally well received. The most notable of these is The Strand by Night from 1937. The same year, he illustrated the cover of the edition of Radio Times, marking the coronation of King George VI and Queen Elizabeth. His post-war work generally included landscapes in a more naturalist style. A sunlit landscape design by Nevinson was among the winning entries in the 1933 Famous Artists competition run by Cadbury's for a series of chocolate box designs and which were displayed at the Leicester Galleries in London. His large painting of 1932 and 1933, The Twentieth Century used futurist devices to attack Fascism and Nazism. He also produced large historic allegories which were considered inferior to his World War One paintings. Kenneth Clark, then the Director of the National Gallery, made some comments on these lines and, in return, Nevinson became a fierce critic of Clark. Nevinson was awarded the Chevalier of the Legion d'Honneur in 1938 and was made an Associate of the Royal Academy in 1939.

=== World War Two ===
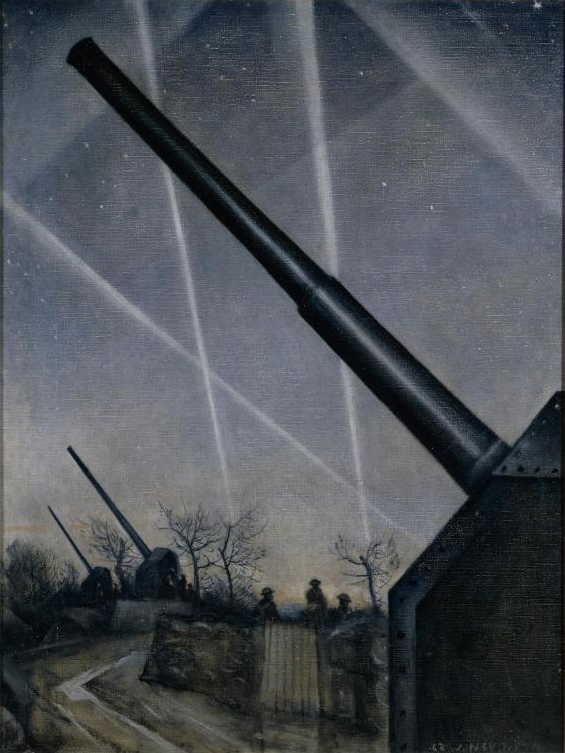
Anti-aircraft Defences (1940) (Art.IWM ART LD14)

At the start of World War Two the British Government created the War Artists' Advisory Committee, WAAC, and appointed Kenneth Clark as its chairman. Despite the public hostility between Clark and himself, Nevinson was disappointed not to be offered a commission by WAAC. He submitted three paintings to WAAC in December 1940 which were also rejected. He worked as a stretcher-bearer in London throughout The Blitz, during which his own studio and the family home in Hampstead were hit by bombs. WAAC eventually purchased two pictures from him, Anti-aircraft Defences and a depiction of a fire-bomb attack, The Fire of London, December 29th – An Historic Record.

Nevinson obtained a commission from the Royal Air Force to portray airmen preparing for the Dieppe raid in August 1942 and they also allowed him to fly in their planes to develop pictures of the air war. He presented a painting, a cloudscape entitled The Battlefields of Britain, to Winston Churchill as a gift to the nation and which still hangs in Downing Street. Shortly afterwards a stroke paralysed his right hand and caused a speech impediment. He applied for a junior clerical post with WAAC and was refused. Nevinson taught himself to paint with his left hand and had three pictures shown at the Royal Academy in the summer of 1946. He attended that exhibition, with the assistance of his wife Kathleen, in a wheelchair but died a few months later aged fifty-seven.

== Bibliography ==
- 1918 Nevinson, C.R.W. and Flitch, J.E. Crawford, The Great War: Fourth Year. London. Grant Richards Limited.
- 1917 Nevinson, C.R.W. and Konody, Paul G., Modern War Paintings. London. Grant Richards Limited.
- 1938 Nevinson, C.R.W., Paint and Prejudice. New York. Harcourt Brace and Company.
