= La Mitrailleuse =

Painting by C. R. W. Nevinson

Coordinates: 51°30′34″N 0°7′41″W

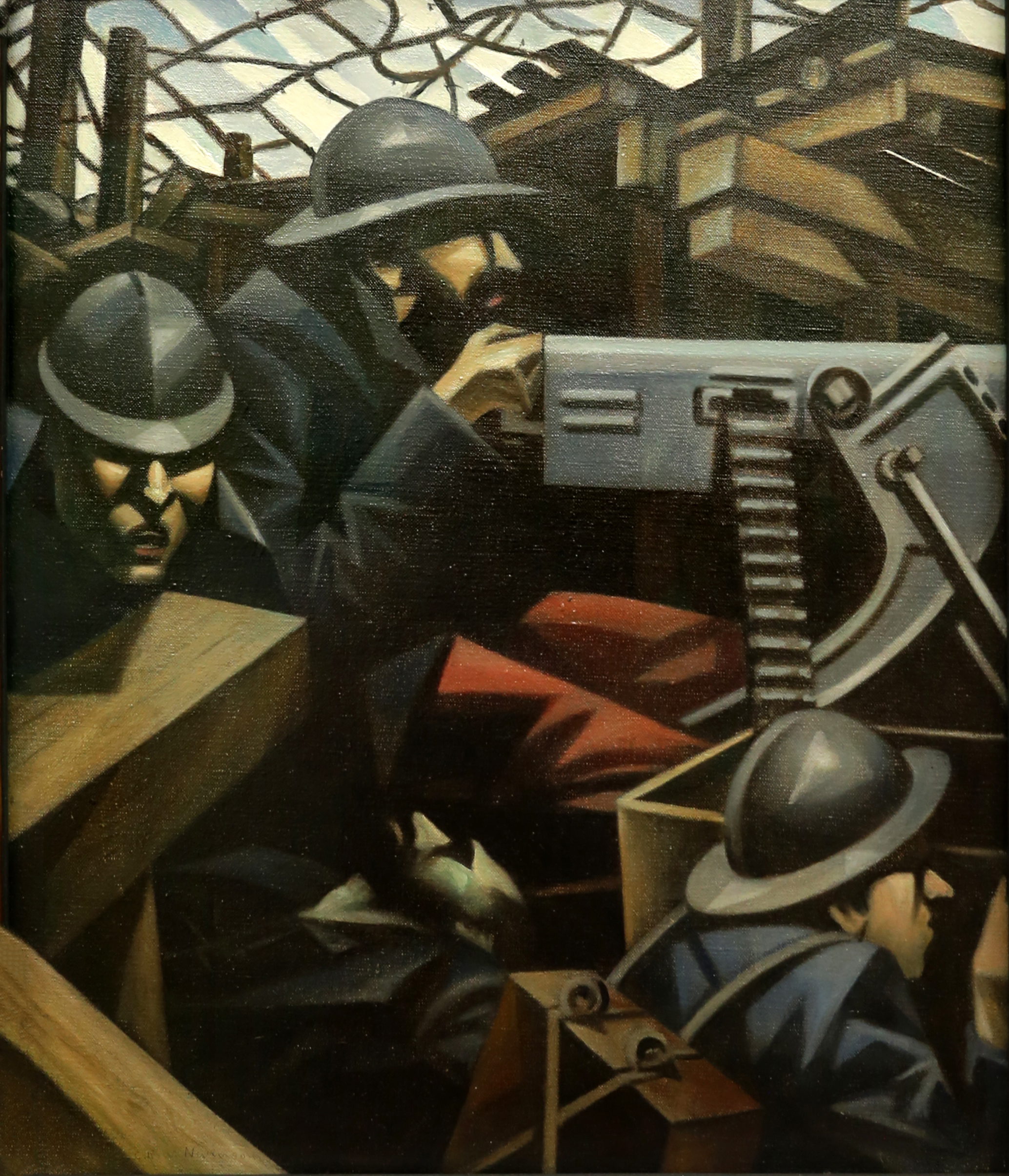
- Artist: C.R.W. Nevinson
- Year: 1915
- Type: Oil on canvas
- Dimensions: 61 cm × 50.8 cm (24 in × 20.0 in)
- Location: Tate Britain, London

La Mitrailleuse is an oil on canvas painting by British artist C. R. W. Nevinson, from 1915. It was made while he was on honeymoon leave from service as an ambulance driver with the RAMC on the Western Front during the First World War. It is held at the Tate Britain, in London.

== History and description ==
Mitrailleuse is the French word for machine gun, and originated from the mid-19th century French volley gun, the mitrailleuse. The painting shows three soldiers in the trenches wearing metal Adrian helmets, one firing a machine gun. A fourth soldier lies dead beside them. Around them are wooden beams and barbed wire. The subjects are abstracted into angular geometric blocks of colour, becoming dehumanised components in a machine of death. Nevinson later wrote: "To me the soldier [was] going to be dominated by the machine ... I was the first man to express this feeling on canvas."

In an article in The Burlington Magazine in 1916, artist Walter Sickert called the work "the most authoritative and concentrated utterance on the war in the history of painting".

The painting was exhibited at the Grafton Galleries and Leicester Galleries in 1916, and donated to the Tate Gallery by the Contemporary Art Society in 1917. It is held now at the Tate Britain.

La Mitrailleuse inspired the OMD song of the same name, featured on The Punishment of Luxury (2017).
