= The Arrival (video game) =

1997 video game

- Developers: Enteraktion, Inc.
- Publisher: Live Interactive
- Platforms: Macintosh, Windows
- Release: July 15, 1997
- Genre: Adventure game

The Arrival is a 1997 adventure game developed by Enteraktion and published by Live Interactive. It was released on Mac and Windows. It's an adaption of the film of the same name.

== Plot and gameplay ==
The plot takes place ten years after the unsuccessful alien invasion as depicted in the film, where the extraterrestrials have kidnapped the player, who must escape while avoiding detection.

The game's over 400 backgrounds depict the planet and the surrounding moons.

Played in the first-person with full movement, the game's puzzles have a science fiction theme. The game has a hint system, and is non-linear.

== Reception ==
Reception

Review scores
Publication	Score
PC Gamer (US)	81%
Computer Games Strategy Plus	2/5

Tap Repeatedly described the game as both fun and compelling. Quandary felt seeing the film was not a requirement to enjoy the video game, which they saw as a positive. GameSpot thought the title was let down by its puzzles and soundscape. Just Adventure wrote that the game would provide mind-numbing passing of the time, while not being good in any sense. Mac Gamer deemed it a disappointing follow-up to the film.
