= Untamed City: Carnival of Secrets =

2012 novel by Melissa Marr

- First edition (original title)
- Author: Melissa Marr
- Original title: Carnival of Souls
- Language: English
- Series: Untamed City
- Genre: Young adult Urban fantasy
- Publisher: HarperTeen, an imprint of HarperCollins
- Publication date: September 4, 2012
- Publication place: United States
- Media type: Print (hardcover)
- Pages: 306
- ISBN: 0-06-165928-2

Untamed City: Carnival of Secrets, formerly published as Carnival of Souls is a young adult fantasy novel by author Melissa Marr. It was published by HarperTeen, a division of HarperCollins, in September 2012. Marr has stated that there will be at least one sequel to the book.

== Plot ==
Untamed City: Carnival of Secrets is set in two worlds: our own, and the city of daimons, ruled by a rigid class structure. In the human world, 17-year-old Mallory only knows about the City from her father, who told her the story of how he and every other witch fled from for their lives from the daimons. Meanwhile, Aya and Kaleb are fighting for their lives in the heart of the City at the Carnival, and Mallory has no idea that forces are leading her there as well.

== Reception ==
Reviews for the book were mixed. Booklist favorably compared the "feisty female warriors" and themes of social justice to The Hunger Games. Publishers Weekly praised the "blend of dark romance, fantasy, and action," but criticized the abrupt ending. Kirkus called the setting a "complicated, shallowly rendered world" and criticized the book for graphic violence. The book received a 2012 Voice of Youth Advocates starred review.

== External Sources ==
- Book Website
- Book Trailer
