= Arrival (novel) =

2009 novel by Chris Morphew

The Phoenix Files, Arrival
- Australian first edition
- Author: Chris Morphew
- Language: English
- Series: The Phoenix Files
- Genre: Science fiction/ Young adult/ Adventure
- Publisher: Hardie Grant/Egmont
- Publication date: 1 June 2009
- Publication place: Australia
- Media type: Print (Hardback)
- Pages: 295
- ISBN: 978-1-921502-39-2
- Followed by: Contact

The Phoenix Files: Arrival is a Science fiction/young adult/adventure written by Australian author Chris Morphew. It was first released in Australia on 1 June 2009. In Arrival, 15-year-old Luke Hunter and his mother Emily move to Phoenix, a town no one has heard of with no cars, no phones and no internet. He soon discovers the Shackleton Cooperative, the cooperative running town are plotting to end the world in 100 days.

== Plot ==
Luke Hunter moves with his mother, Emily, to Phoenix, are greeted by Aaron Ketterley and Bruce Calvin and escorted to their new house. Luke discovers there is no phone or internet reception and bicycles are the main mode of transportation.

The next morning, Luke is taken to his new school, given a laptop and introduced to Peter Weir, who Luke soon befriends. Peter shows Luke to his locker. The order of the lockers is done by the order of arrival of students, his being the last. In their first class of the day, Luke is introduced to Mike, Cat and Tank who were Peter's old friends and Jordan, the last person to move to Phoenix.

When Luke gets home, he finds a USB flash drive inside with the initials 'JB' etched onto it. He opens it on his new laptop and sees a random code of letters. There is only one suspect he can think of with those initials: Jordan Burke. Luke is viciously confronted by Jordan who was also given a USB with the initials 'LH' etched onto it. Peter suspects the number combinations from both USBs are a two parts of a bigger file. The next day before school, Luke and Jordan watch a recorded message of Ketterley and Calvin discussing the Cooperative's plot to wipe out the world outside of Phoenix in 100 days' time with an unknown called "Tabitha".

They go to Jordan's house and she discusses with them that her mom is pregnant. They go on a biking trip to the X's on Crazy Bill's map and to the nearest town so they can call their parents. The next morning, Crazy Bill comes and bashes Luke up. He wakes up in the medical center by Dr Montag, the town's doctor, and Calvin informs him Bill has been arrested. Jordan, Luke and Peter find a warehouse of the town's supplies and see an issue of Time magazine dated for next July with Shackleton on the cover. They find a three-story-high, two-meter thick concrete wall that surrounds Phoenix. They climb over and see the land is a barren wasteland. Reeve finds them and taken back to town to be interviewed by Calvin, Reeve says they were lost. Crazy Bill escapes the security center. The next day Luke, Peter and Jordan hear a phone ringing in the town square.

== Main characters ==
- Luke Hunter is the 15-year-old main protagonist of Arrival who moved to Phoenix from Sydney. His and his mother's arrival in Phoenix triggers the hundred-day countdown to the end of the world as they are the last citizens to arrive. He befriends Peter and Jordan. He is resentful of his mum divorcing his dad.
- Peter Weir is among the first of Phoenix's citizens and the first Luke meets at Phoenix High. He is falling in love with Jordan.
- Jordan Burke one of the newest citizens to Phoenix and her feelings toward Peter are neutral, despite his attraction to her. She serves as the group's glue whenever disagreements arise.
- Emily Hunter is Luke's recently divorced mother who is much more keen to move to Phoenix than he is. She remains oblivious to the Co-operative's real intentions.
- Off. Matthew Reeve works as a security guard for Phoenix's security force, in place of police. He aids the main group's escape from the airport and covers for them after they were caught on the opposite side of the fence.
- Off. Bruce Calvin is the main security chief working in Phoenix. He is badly injured after he catches Crazy Bill at the town's airport.
- Crazy Bill is Phoenix's only homeless person and is described by security guards as suffering from 'fallout'. He knows much information about the Co-operative's schemes.
- Dr. Rob Montag is Phoenix's doctor who treats Luke after he is randomly bashed by Crazy Bill.
- Ms Pryor is Phoenix High's principal who keeps a very close watch on Luke, Jordan and Peter.

== Reception ==
Reviewers praised the suspense generated by Arrival. Readings calls it a "good conspiracy thriller" that pulls the reader along, wondering what will happen next. Kirkus Reviews complements the book, calling it "compulsively readable," though the review also describes it as "commercial grade" and notes that it would be "unsatisfying" if read without the rest of the series.
