= Melissa Marr =

American writer

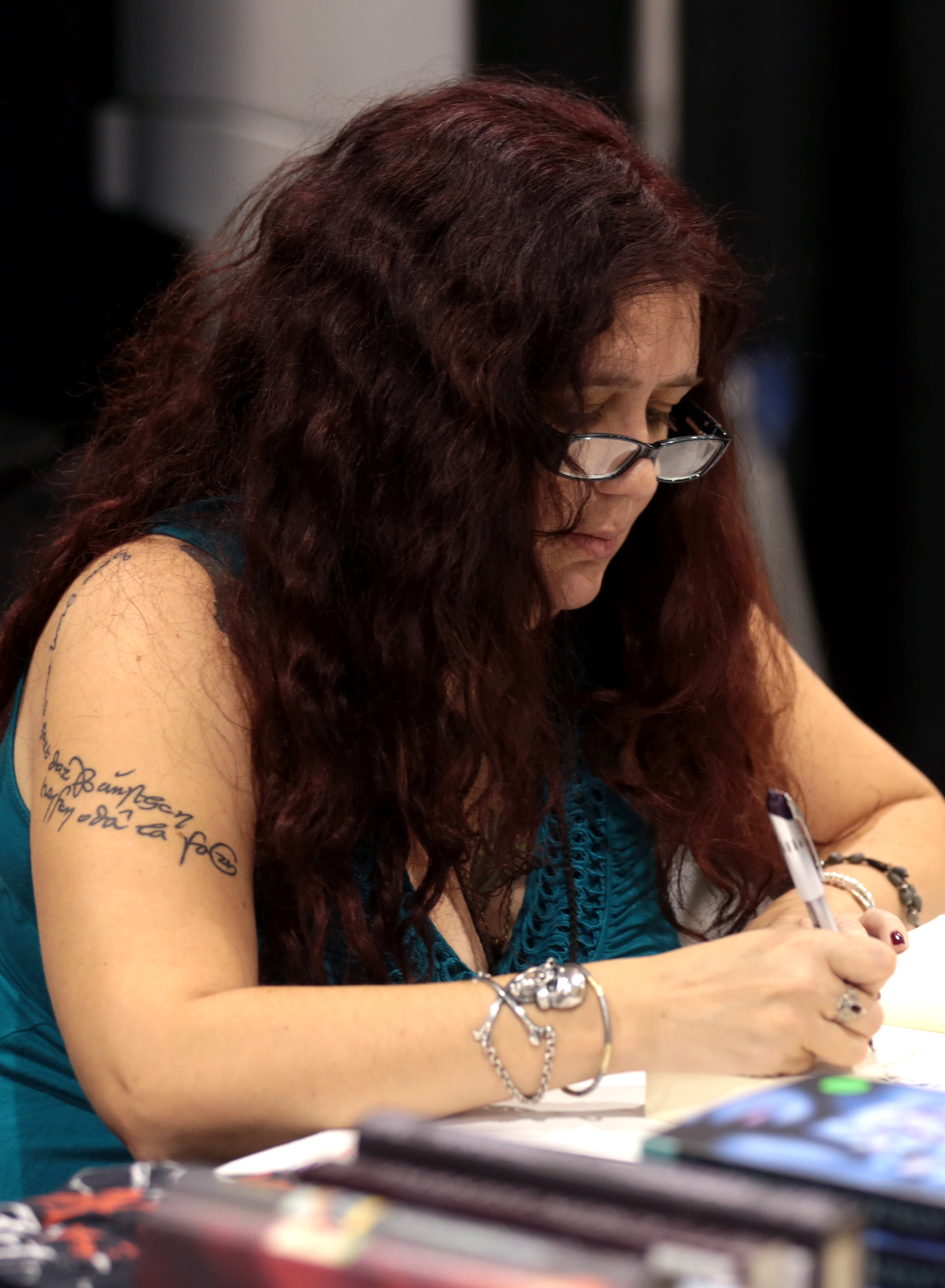
- Marr at the 2018 Phoenix Comic Fest
- Born: July 25, 1972 (age 54)
- Occupation: Writer
- Children: 3
- Writing career
- Language: English
- Genre: Young adult/Urban fantasy
- Notable work: Wicked Lovely
- Notable awards: RITA award – Young Adult Romance; 2008 Wicked Lovely
- Website: melissa-marr.com

Melissa Marr (born July 25, 1972) is an American author of young adult/urban fantasy novels. She is a winner of the Romance Writers of America RITA Award.

== Biography ==
Marr, a former university English teacher, currently resides in Arizona. Her first novel was published in 2007, the New York Times bestseller Wicked Lovely. Along with four more books in that series, which were also New York Times bestsellers, she has also written an adult novel, Graveminder, which won the 2011 Goodreads Readers Choice Award for "Best Horror" and was a "Top Pick Fantasy" with VOYA. She has written other young adult, adult, and children's fiction. She is also a frequent contributor of short fiction to anthologies and has edited one anthology with Kelley Armstrong, with whom she also wrote the series Loki's Wolves, published under the name M.A. Marr.

== Bibliography ==
=== Young adult novels ===
==== Wicked Lovely series ====
- Wicked Lovely (2007)
- Ink Exchange (2008)
- Fragile Eternity (2009)
- Radiant Shadows (2010)
- Darkest Mercy (2011)

==== Other young adult novels ====
- Untamed City: Carnival of Secrets (2012)
- Made For You (2013)
- Seven Black Diamonds (2016)
- One Blood Ruby (2017)

=== Middle grade novels ===
- Loki's Wolves, as M.A. Marr, with Kelley Armstrong (Spring 2013)
- Odin's Ravens, as M.A. Marr, with Kelley Armstrong (Spring 2014)
- Thor's Serpents, as M.A. Marr, with Kelley Armstrong (Spring 2015)
- The Hidden Knife, (Spring 2021)

=== Adult novels ===
- Graveminder (2011)
- The Arrivals (2013)
- Pretty Broken Things (An Audible Original (2020)

==== Wicked Lovely Adult series ====
- Cold Iron Heart (2020)

==== Faery Bargains Adult series ====
- The Wicked & The Dead (2020)

=== Picture books ===
- Bunny Roo, I Love You (2015)
- Baby Dragon (2019)
- Bunny Roo and Duckling Too (2021)

==== Faery Bargains Adult series ====
- The Wicked & The Dead (2020)

=== Picture books ===
- Bunny Roo, I Love You (2015)
- Baby Dragon (2019)
- Bunny Roo and Duckling Too (2021)

=== Graphic novels ===
- The Strange Case of Harleen and Harley (2023)

==== Wicked Lovely: Desert Tales series ====
- Volume 1: Sanctuary (2009)
- Volume 2: Challenge (2010)
- Volume 3: Resolve (2011)

=== Short fiction ===
==== Collections ====
- Faery Tales and Nightmares (2011)
- Tales of Folk and Fey (2019)

==== Anthologies edited ====
- Enthralled: Paranormal Diversions, with Kelley Armstrong
- Shards and Ashes, with Kelley Armstrong
- Rags and Bones: New Twists on Timeless Tales (2013), with Tim Pratt

==== Anthologies contributed to ====
- Enthralled: Paranormal Diversions
- Teeth: Vampire Tales
- Love Is Hell
- Naked City
- Home Improvement: Undead Edition
- Unbound

==== Nonfiction anthologies contributed to ====
- Life Inside My Mind
- Things We Haven't Said

== Awards and honors ==
=== Wicked Lovely ===
- New York Public Library's Books for the Teen Age 2008
- Amazon's Best Books of 2007: Top 10 Editor's Picks: Teens
- IRA Notable Books 2008: Young Adult Fiction
- 2008 - Romance Writers of America RITA Award, Young Adult Romance
