= The Arrival (1996 film) =

1996 film by David Twohy

- Theatrical release poster
- Directed by: David Twohy
- Written by: David Twohy
- Produced by: Thomas G. Smith; James Steele
- Starring: Charlie Sheen; Lindsay Crouse; Teri Polo; Richard Schiff; Leon Rippy; Tony T. Johnson; Ron Silver
- Cinematography: Hiro Narita
- Edited by: Martin Hunter
- Music by: Arthur Kempel
- Production companies: Live Entertainment; Interscope Communications; PolyGram Filmed Entertainment; Steelework Films
- Distributed by: Orion Pictures
- Release date: May 31, 1996
- Running time: 115 minutes
- Countries: United States; Mexico
- Language: English
- Budget: $25 million
- Box office: $14 million

The Arrival is a 1996 science fiction thriller film written and directed by David Twohy and starring Charlie Sheen, Lindsay Crouse, Ron Silver, Teri Polo, and Richard Schiff. Sheen stars as Zane Zaminsky, a radio astronomer who discovers evidence of intelligent alien life and quickly finds himself in the middle of a conspiracy with global consequences. The film is an international co-production between the United States and Mexico. A sequel, Arrival II, was released direct-to-video in 1998.

== Plot ==
Zane Zaminsky and Calvin, radio astronomers employed by SETI, detect and record an extraterrestrial radio signal from Wolf 336, a star located 14 light-years away from Earth. Zane reports his discovery to his supervisor, Phil "Gordi" Gordian, at the NASA Jet Propulsion Laboratory (JPL), but Gordi dismisses the findings and later destroys the tape. Zane is terminated due to alleged budget cuts and blacklisted, which prevents him from working at other telescopes. While having troubles with his girlfriend Char, Zane takes up a job as a television satellite dish installer and secretly creates his own telescope array with the aid of his customers' dishes in the neighborhood. He operates it covertly from his attic with the assistance of his young next-door neighbor, Kiki.

After again locating the extraterrestrial radio signal, Zane realizes that it is being drowned out by a terrestrial signal originating from a Mexican radio station. He attempts to seek the help of Calvin but finds that he has died, supposedly due to carbon monoxide poisoning (though he was actually murdered). Zane travels to Mexico and discovers that the radio station has just been destroyed by fire. Exploring the area, he stumbles upon a recently constructed power plant where he meets Ilana Green, a climatologist from NCAR, whose atmospheric analysis equipment is confiscated by the plant's aggressive security forces. Before they are released from the plant, Zane notices that one of the guards resembles Gordi. Ilana explains that the Earth's temperature has rapidly increased by a few degrees, leading to the melting of polar ice and a shift in the ecosystem. She is investigating the power plant, which seems to be one of several recently built facilities across the world that may be responsible for the rise in temperature. As Zane and Ilana regroup, Gordi dispatches agents disguised as gardeners to release a device in Zane's attic that makes his equipment vanish. Zane leaves Ilana at the hotel and goes to investigate the power plant, but scorpions are planted in her room kill her.

Sneaking into the power plant, Zane discovers it is a facade for an extraterrestrial base. The aliens blend in with humanity by wearing an external skin, and the base emits massive amounts of greenhouse gases. Zane escapes and returns to the nearby town to seek help from the local inspector. However, the aliens bring Ilana's body to the police station, implicating Zane as a suspect in her death, prompting him to flee back to the United States. Zane confronts Gordi at the JPL headquarters and coerces him into confessing that the aliens are raising Earth's temperature to eliminate the human race and create a more livable environment for themselves (like terraforming). Gordi suggests aliens were behind the recent NASA failures; inquiring, "Ask yourself why an antenna won't deploy on a deep-space probe. Or ask how they could launch a $6 billion telescope without testing its mirror." Zane secretly records the conversation and reveals the recording to Gordi, who dispatches agents to apprehend Zane.

Returning home, Zane discovers that his attic has been emptied of all equipment. He enlists the help of Char and Kiki to journey to a radio astronomy array with the intention of sending his recording to a news satellite. Gordi and his agents sabotage the telescope controls, so Zane entrusts the tape to Kiki and instructs him to transmit it when given the signal. Zane and Char run to the telescope's base, lock themselves in the control room, and make the necessary adjustments. When Zane orders Kiki to activate the tape, Kiki reveals himself to be an alien agent and unlocks the door. Gordi enters and seizes the tape.

Zane subdues Gordi and his agents with liquid nitrogen. While retrieving the tape from Gordi's jacket, one of the agents accidentally releases a sphere that begins to engulf the room. Zane and Char flee upward through the radio telescope station's access shaft before the device causes the base to implode and the antenna to collapse onto it. From their vantage point on the antenna, they spot Kiki below and tell him to inform the other aliens that Zane will soon broadcast the tape.

== Cast ==
- Charlie Sheen as Zane Zaminsky, a SETI researcher
- Lindsay Crouse as Ilana Green, a scientist researching the effect of greenhouse gases in the Arctic
- Teri Polo as Char, an investment banker and Zane's girlfriend
- Richard Schiff as Calvin, Zane's colleague at SETI
- Leon Rippy as DOD #1, the lead agent hired by Phil
- Tony T. Johnson as Kiki, a neighbor of Zane's
- Ron Silver as Phil "Gordi" Gordian, Zane and Calvin's supervisor at NASA's Jet Propulsion Laboratory
  - Silver also appears as a doppelganger Mexican guard whom Zane meets in the fictional city of San Marsol

== Production ==
Prior to the film's release, the working title was Shockwave. Filming took place primarily in Mexico, with additional scenes filmed at the Owens Valley Radio Observatory. The alien creatures were all digitally created for the movie by Pacific Data Images. Charlie Sheen had previously collaborated with David Twohy on Terminal Velocity, and Twohy had written the main role intending for Sheen to star.

== Critical reception ==
The film received mixed to positive reviews from critics; at review aggregation website, Rotten Tomatoes it has a rating of 66% based on reviews from 35 critics, with an average score of 6.2/10, and its consensus states that "The Arrival is stylish and inventive and offers a surprisingly smart spin on the alien invasion genre."

== Box office ==
The film was a commercial failure. It only grossed US$14 million in the North American domestic market, against an estimated production budget of US$25 million. Part of this was due to high-visibility marketing campaign for the release of Independence Day just over a month later, which went on to become a box office phenomenon. The Arrival had a rather successful run internationally, partly because Charlie Sheen still maintained high popularity worldwide at the time.

=== Home media ===
A Blu-ray version of the film was released April 21, 2009. Unlike the laserdisc release, the Blu-ray version includes no special features. The laserdisc release included commentary, documentaries and alternative endings not included in the Blu-ray or DVD releases.

== Sequel ==
A sequel, Arrival II, was released on November 6, 1998.

== Video game ==
The Arrival was released on Windows in 1997.

== See also ==
- List of films featuring extraterrestrials
