= Graveminder =

2011 Gothic mystery novel by Melissa Marr

- First edition US cover for Graveminder
- Author: Melissa Marr
- Language: English
- Genre: Fantasy, Mystery, Gothic
- Publisher: William Morrow and Company
- Publication date: May 17, 2011
- Publication place: United States
- Media type: Print
- Pages: 336 pages
- ISBN: 0061826871

Graveminder is a 2011 Gothic mystery novel by Melissa Marr. The novel was released on May 17, 2011 by William Morrow and Company and follows a young woman who returns to her hometown to discover that she is expected to fill the supernatural shoes of her now-deceased grandmother. In 2011 Graveminder won the 2011 Goodreads Readers Choice Award for "Best Horror".

== Synopsis ==
The book follows Rebekkah Barrow, a woman who returns to the small town of Claysville in order to attend the funeral of her grandmother Maylene. She remembers that Maylene always attended the funerals of each townsperson, always taking three sips from a flask and telling the dead to "sleep well and stay where I put you". Once back in Claysville, Rebekkah meets up with her old love interest Byron Montgomery and discovers that she is expected to perform the same ritual that her grandmother did for each funeral, as she is the new Graveminder. Not only is Rebekkah the new Graveminder, but Byron is her Undertaker and her helper in placing the dead back in their grave if the ritual is not performed exactly right. When performed incorrectly or not at all, the dead will walk the earth in an attempt to fulfill their hungers, which is exactly what happens. Rebekkah is soon drawn into a web of secrets, bargains, secret worlds, and murder that threatens to ruin the peace of those in Claysville.

== Characters ==
- Rebekkah Barrow
- Byron Montgomery
- William Montgomery
- Elaine
- Amity Blue
- Cecilia "Cissy" Barrow
- Troy
- Daisha
- Maylene Barrow
- Chris the Sheriff
- Bonnie Jean Blue
- Nicolas Whittaker
- Mr. D or Charlie or Charles
- Alicia Barrow
- Ward

== Reception ==
Critical reception for Graveminder was mostly positive, with positive reviews from NPR and Publishers Weekly. A reviewer for the Independent remarked that the book was "lifeless" while the Journal Gazette remarked that the book had "repetitive conversations [that] suck some of the energy out of the plot" but gave an overall positive review. USA Today and Kirkus Reviews both praised the entry, with USA Today calling it "a creatively creepy gothic tale for grown-ups".

== Awards ==
- 2011, Goodreads Readers Choice Award, "Best Horror"
