= The Arrival (painting) =

Painting by C.R.W. Nevinson

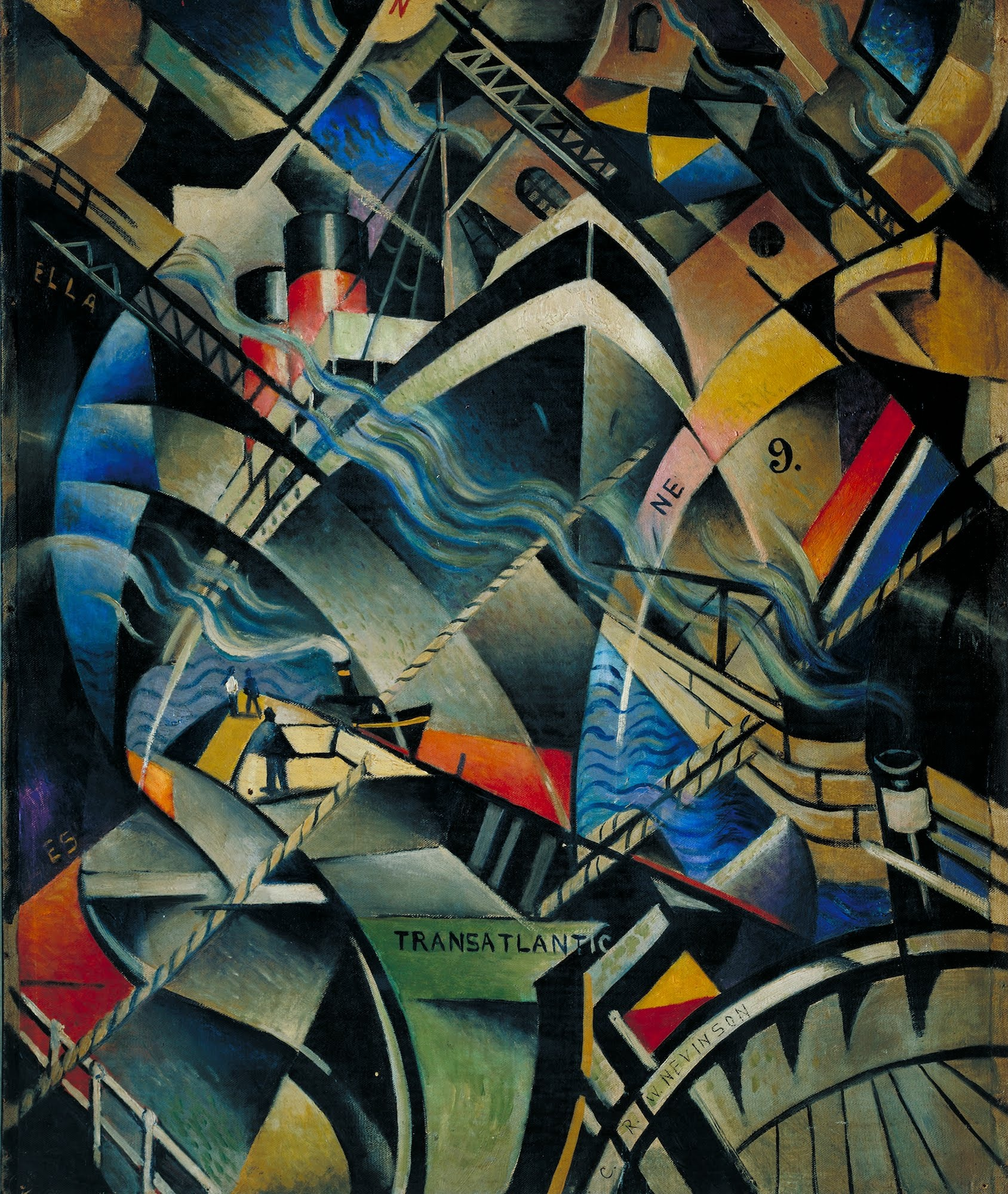
- Artist: C.R.W. Nevinson
- Year: 1913
- Type: Oil on canvas, genre painting
- Dimensions: 76.2 cm × 63.5 cm (30.0 in × 25.0 in)
- Location: Tate Britain, London

The Arrival is an oil painting on canvas by the British artist C. R. W. Nevinson, from 1913. It is held at the Tate Britain, in London.

The painting depicts the arrival of a transatlantic ship into a harbour, from different perspectives. The word "transatlantic" and several people are visible. Nevinson's painting reflects his interest in the Futurist movement. It was exhibited in 1915 under the title My Arrival in Dunkirk. The work is today in the collection of the Tate Britain in Pimlico, having been donated by the artist's widow in 1956.

== Bibliography ==
- Ingleby, Richard. C.R.W. Nevinson: The Twentieth Century. Merrell Holberton, 1999.
