= Fragile Eternity =

2009 novel by Melissa Marr

- Author: Melissa Marr
- Cover artist: Mark Tucker (photography)
- Language: English
- Series: Wicked Lovely
- Genre: Young adult Urban fantasy
- Publisher: HarperTeen, an imprint of HarperCollins
- Publication date: April 21, 2009
- Publication place: United States
- Media type: hardcover
- Pages: 400 (hardcover)
- ISBN: 978-0-06-121465-3
- OCLC: 123118232
- LC Class: PZ7.M34788 Wi 2007
- Preceded by: Ink Exchange
- Followed by: Radiant Shadows

Fragile Eternity is the third novel in the young adult series, Wicked Lovely by Melissa Marr and was published in 2009. Like the other novels in the series, it is set in the same universe but focuses on different characters.

== Plot summary ==
The novel begins with Aislinn and Seth arguing over their relationship, as Seth's mortality, Aislinn's immortality, and her ties to Keenan as the summer queen make a normal relationship near impossible. Meanwhile, Bananach visits her twin sister, the High Queen Sorcha, telling her of Aislinn and Seth's relationship as well as predictions of impending war. Curious about Seth, Sorcha orders Devlin, her brother and advisor, to follow Seth to see if he is any threat to the balance of the Faery courts.

Niall offers Seth the protection of the Dark Court, which means that threats or violence against Seth would be treated as a threat or violence against the court as a whole. Niall explains that this would protect him against any potential threat from Keenan in the event that the Faery king decided to dispose of him.

Due to it being the summer season, Aislinn and Keenan are growing more physically attracted to each other as the king and queen of the summer fae. During this time, the Winter Queen, Donia, grows increasingly unsatisfied with the relationship between herself and Keenan, telling him that his attraction to Aislinn must stop so that she can be the only one in his life. She escalates a confrontation initiated by Aislinn to physical injury.

In the fallout of Keenan healing Aislinn, Seth calls for a break in their relationship. After leaving, Seth is abducted by Bananach, who takes him to Sorcha. Sorcha offers to make Seth a powerful faery capable of using her own powers as long as he stays with her for one month each year. During his time in Faerie, Seth develops a mother/son relationship with Sorcha, gaining great influence in her court as well as a strong connection with her.

Seth, however, is unaware that one day in Faerie is six days in the mortal world and his long disappearance crushes Aislinn. Aislinn attempts to find him, not knowing that Keenan, Niall, and Donia are aware of where he is. Keenan chooses not to tell Aislinn because it would cause her to have conflicts with the High Court and breaks up with Donia in an unsuccessful attempt to woo Aislinn. Niall eventually goes to visit Seth, who is perfectly happy in Faerie, except for his longing for Aislinn. He then tells Niall of his deal with Sorcha, and tells him not to worry about him. Sorcha tells Niall not to tell Seth too much about what is going on in the outside world and especially not to tell Aislinn about his being there.

At this point Seth has been missing for five months and believing him gone for good, Aislinn attempts to seduce Keenan but is rebuffed. Keenan tells Aislinn that he will only sleep with her once she really loves him. Upon his return from Faerie, Aislinn and Keenan are surprised to see that Seth has returned and that he is now a powerful faery with strong ties and influence in Sorcha's court. Keenan runs to Donia to beg for her forgiveness, but is rebuffed by her. Seth discovers that Aislinn has been dating Keenan and blames her for not having faith in their relationship. The novel ends with Seth getting permission to train with Gabriel's Hounds so he can hunt down Bananach.

== Reception ==
Critical reception for Fragile Eternity was mixed to positive, with RT Book Reviews giving it four and a half stars, saying "It's a keeper". Kirkus Reviews said that the book was mediocre and repetitive, but that it would "fly off library and bookstore shelves". Booklist stated that the book was "Slim on plot and heavy with Aislinn’s inner conflict, this will nevertheless be popular with fans of the series".
