= Jianglin (EP) =

Arrival 降临
- Gold version

EP by Top Combine
- Released: October 26, 2008
- Recorded: 2008
- Genre: Mandopop, dance-pop, R&B
- Length: 20:52
- Label: EE Media, Doremi Media
- Producer: Kim Kibom

Top Combine chronology
Arrival 降临 (2008)	Grandness Equal to Heaven (2009)

Singles from Arrival
- 1. "Arrival" Released: September 8, 2008; 2. "Cotton Candy" Released: October 19, 2008

Arrival also known as The Advent or Jiang Lin (降临), is the debut EP by Mandopop boy band, Top Combine. The EP was released on October 26, 2008 in People's Republic of China by EE Media. The EP was also released in two separate versions, a "black" version and a "gold" version.

Arrival is influenced by K-pop melodies, which has heavy focuses on hip hop, R&B, and dance-pop. A majority of the EP was produced and recorded in South Korea in March 2008, and the EP is also produced by several famous Korean producers, such as Kim Kibom. The music video for the EP's first promotional single, "Arrival", was also filmed in South Korea, directed by Chun Hyuk-jin, the same director who directed some music videos for SM Entertainment artists.

== Recording and promotion ==
The EP was recorded in South Korea under the supervision of Doremi Media, Top Combine's management in Korea. Kim Kibom, the producer of the title single "Arrival," produced the song "especially for the group." Influenced by modern K-pop, the single is produced with elements of hip hop, rock, and contemporary dance-pop. Vocally, the single incorporates harmonization and rap, arguably similar to SM Entertainment's SMP genre. The side tracks of the album, such as "Cotton Candy", "Next Stop, Forever," etc. are less concentrated on hip hop, but they are portrayed as a faction of bubblegum pop. "Cotton Candy" was also composed and written by Top Combine member, Mars Ma.

Top Combine noted that the EP was not only experimental, but also very enjoyable to record. The EP includes elements of music style that Mainland Chinese boy bands have not experimented in the past, and the group was eager to test out the new style.

As soon as the album was released on October 19, the group went on a nationwide tour to promote the album, appearing in many variety programs and music programs that are broadcast on national television. Their appearance on Hunan TV's Happy Camp (快乐大本营) snatched an overwhelmingly high rating of 2.14, making the variety show to achieve the highest ratings of China for the month.

== Track listing ==
1. "Arrival" (simplified Chinese: 降临; traditional Chinese: 降臨; pinyin: Jiàng Lín) - 3:45
2. "Cotton Candy" (Chinese: 棉花糖; pinyin: Mián Huā Táng) - 3:51
3. "Next Stop, Forever" (simplified Chinese: 下一站永远; traditional Chinese: 下一站永遠; pinyin: Xià Yī Zhàn Yǒng Yuǎn) - 4:51
4. "Clown (I Can't Let You Go)" (simplified Chinese: 小丑; traditional Chinese: 小醜; pinyin: Xiǎo Chǒu) - 4:39
5. "Kiss" - 3:52
