= Sun Rui (singer) =

Chinese singer and actress

- 孙芮
- Born: 29 July 1995 (age 30); Harbin, Heilongjiang, China
- Other name: Three Sun
- Occupations: Singer; dancer; actress
- Agent: Star48 Culture Media Group
- Musical career
- Genres: Mandopop
- Instrument: Vocals
- Years active: 2013–present
- Label: Star48 Culture Media Group

Chinese name
- Traditional Chinese: 孫芮
- Simplified Chinese: 孙芮
Transcriptions
Standard Mandarin
- Hanyu Pinyin: Sūn Ruì
- Website: sunrui-official.com

Sun Rui (simplified Chinese: 孙芮; traditional Chinese: 孫芮; pinyin: Sūn Ruì, born 29 July 1995) is a Chinese singer, dancer, and actress. Sun started her career as a member of idol girl group SNH48, of which she was a member from 2013 to 2021.

== Career ==
Sun took part in the audition for SNH48's second-generation members, and was one of 34 girls who qualified on August 18, 2013; on November 11, she was assigned to Team SII, of which she had been a member until 2021. On November 16, Sun participated in SNH48's first major concert, "SNH48 Guangzhou Concert", held in the Guangzhou International Sports Arena.

On April 20, 2016, Sun was announced as a member of Electroeyes Girls, a sub-unit which focuses on e-sports. From July 8 to August 12, Sun appeared on the third season of Chinese reality television series The Amazing Race China along with groupmate Huang Tingting, with their team being eliminated during the fifth leg.

Sun was ranked 18th with 35458.6 votes in SNH48 Group's fourth general election, held on July 29, 2017, placing her among the Under Girls and marking the first time she ranked within the top few positions. The following year, she was announced as a member of the sub-unit BlueV along with Li Yuqi, Mo Han, Wan Lina and Lyu Yi during SNH48's fifth anniversary concert held on February 2, 2018; they released their debut EP MAMI on September 7. During SNH48 Group's fifth general election on July 28, Sun came in 17th with 47733.14 votes, again placing her among the Under Girls.

During SNH48 Group's fifth general election held on July 27, 2019, Sun came in 13th with 571,978 votes, subsequently she was featured on the title track of the group's EP Poetry About Time along with the top 16 members.

In March 2020, Sun participated in the second season of iQiYi's reality show Youth With You as a trainee under Star48 Culture Media. Despite not making it into girl group The9 as a result of coming in 17th overall, the popularity she received from the show led to her coming in first with 3,533,525 votes during SNH48 Group's seventh general election, held on August 15. As a reward, she released her solo debut EP Sugarfree on January 11, 2021.

In 2021, Sun marked her acting debut through her appearance in the Zhang Yibai-directed film The Day We Lit Up the Sky as one of its lead actors, with the film being released on July 17. On August 7, during SNH48's eighth general election, Sun retained the top position with 3,123,409 votes, becoming the third member to be elevated to the Star Palace after Ju Jingyi and Li Yitong.

== Discography ==
=== Albums ===
Year	English title	Chinese title	Notes/Ref.
2021	Sugarfree		

=== Singles ===
Year	English title	Chinese title	Notes
2020	"Keep Fighting"		
2021	"One Of Them"	等等	

=== Soundtrack appearances ===
Year	English title	Chinese title	Album	Notes/Ref.
2021	"The Day We Lit Up the Sky"	燃野少年的天空	The Day We Lit Up the Sky OST	with the entire cast
2021	"Blind Box"	青春是盲盒呀	The Day We Lit Up the Sky OST	with Xu-Yang Yuzhuo, Yuan Yiqi, You Miao, Chen Lin and Qi Jing

== Filmography ==
=== Film ===
Year	English title	Chinese title	Role	Notes/Ref.
2021	The Day We Lit Up the Sky	燃野少年的天空	Pan Pan 潘潘	
2022	Dongbo Xueying Land	雪鹰领主	Yu Jing Qu 余靖秋	

=== Variety shows ===
Year	English title	Chinese title	Role	Network	Notes/Ref.
2016	The Amazing Race China 3	极速前进中国版3	Contestant	Shenzhen Television	With Huang Tingting
2018	The Touching Taste	心动的味道·厨语		IQIYI	
2020	Youth With You 2	青春有你2	Contestant	IQIYI	Finished 17th
2021	Youth And Melody	金曲青春		Dragon Television	
2021	Boxing Battle	拳力以赴的我们	Contestant	Youku	
