= The Amazing Race China 3 =

Season of television series

- Season 3
- Presented by: Allan Wu
- No. of teams: 8
- Winners: Guo Jingjing & Huo Qigang
- No. of legs: 10
- Distance traveled: 61,300 km (38,100 mi)
- No. of episodes: 10

Release
- Original network: Shenzhen TV
- Original release: 8 July – 16 September 2016

Additional information
- Filming dates: 18 April – 23 July 2016

Series chronology
- ← Previous; Season 2 Next → Season 4

The Amazing Race China 3 (Chinese: 极速前进第三季) is the third season of The Amazing Race China (Chinese: 极速前进; pinyin: Jísù Qiánjìn), a Chinese reality competition show based on the American series The Amazing Race. Hosted by Singapore based Chinese-American actor Allan Wu, it featured eight teams of two, each with a pre-existing relationship and including at least one celebrity contestant, in a race around the world. This season visited four continents and ten countries and travelled over 61,300 kilometres (38,100 mi) during ten leg. Starting in Beijing, racers travelled through Greece, Germany, Japan, Russia, Guangdong, Hong Kong, Spain, Italy, the United States, Mexico and Brazil before finishing in Rio de Janeiro with intermittent returns to China throughout the season. As this season coincided with the 2016 Summer Olympics, this season was themed after the Summer Olympic Games with each visited city previously serving as a Summer Olympics host city and many tasks themed after Olympic sports. Starting with this season, the show's name was also changed from The Amazing Race to The Amazing Race China. The season premiered on Shenzhen TV on 8 July 2016 and concluded on 16 September 2016.

Married couple Guo Jingjing and Huo Qigang were the winners of this season, while models Liu Chang and Jin Dachuan finished in second place and friends Liu Xiang and Xu Qifeng finished in third place.

== Production ==
=== Development and filming ===
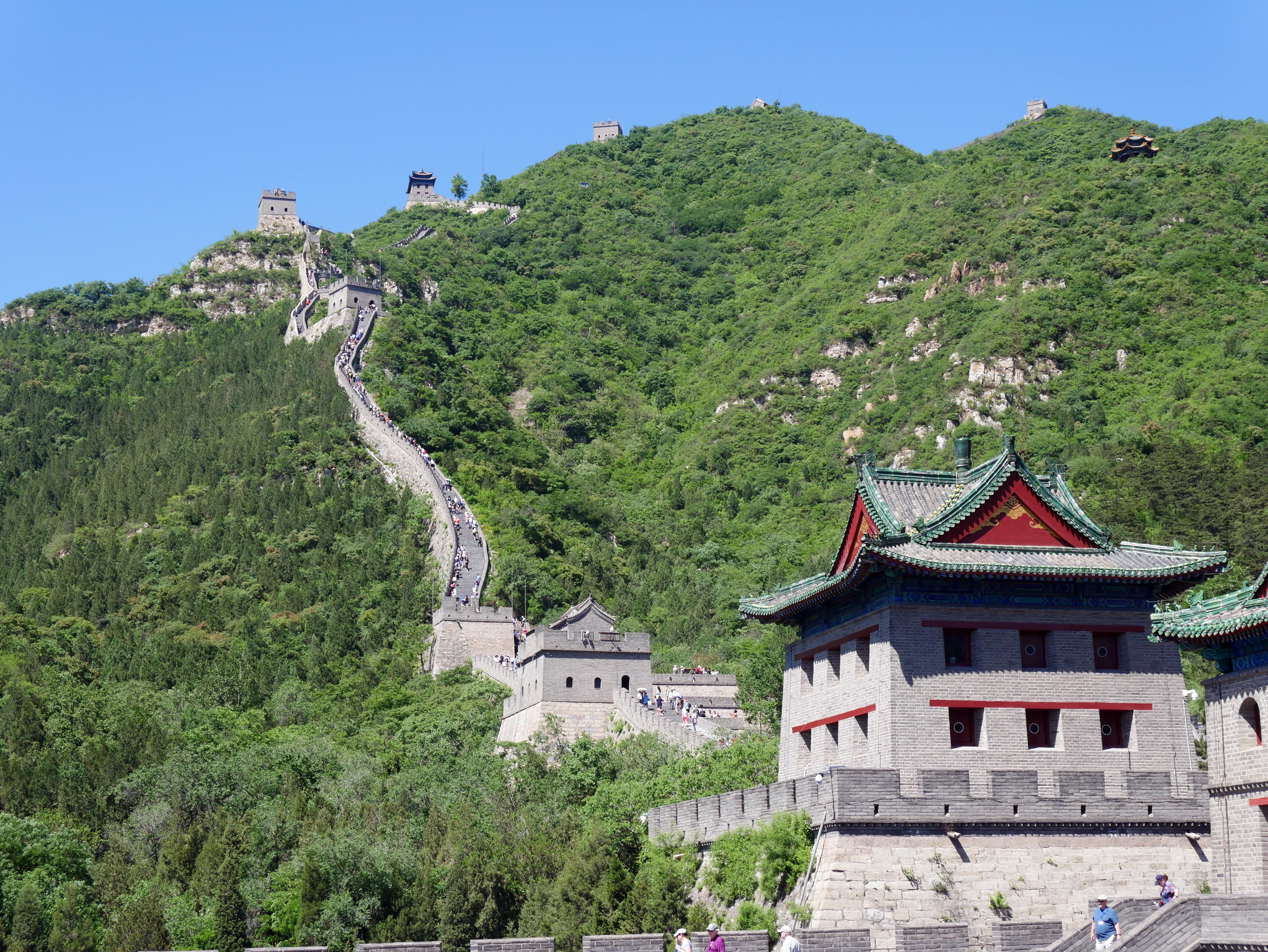
The Juyong Pass at the Great Wall of China was the Starting Line of The Amazing Race China 3.

Tapings for the series begin on April 18 in Beijing and ended on July 23 in Rio de Janeiro.

This season changed its name from The Amazing Race to The Amazing Race China, with the changing name shown on the clues and promotion for the show, and also adopting the American-style title sequence (based on Season 23) instead of a unique title card used for the first two seasons. This season is themed after the Summer Olympic Games. All the cities visited in this series had hosted Summer Olympics, and the finale was set in the host city of 2016 Summer Olympics – Rio de Janeiro, Brazil.

This is also the first (and to date, the only) season in The Amazing Race China that the Finish Line was not held in the home nation of China, and none of the eliminated teams were present at the Finish Line.

== Release ==
=== Programming ===
A preview episode (极速抢先看), sponsored by Centaine, was broadcast before the start of the episode, featuring a few minutes on the start of the leg, as well as snippets from the previous episode.

Similar to previous seasons, a two-part special season-end reunion and recap titled Jin Xing Reviewing the Race (金姐聊极速) aired a week after the season finale aired on 23 and 30 September 2016. The show, hosted by Jin Xing (also a racer this season and host of The Jin Xing Show), discusses the top four of eight teams to review the season as a whole.

=== Marketing ===
This season featured brand new sponsors which were prominently featured in the show as well as on promotional material. Infiniti left as the main sponsor to produce Race the World, with By-Health becoming the replacement main sponsor for this season. In each leg, teams were able to pick up McDonald's food and Eastroc Super Drink at specific points, and the top three were given By-Health protein drinks at every Pit Stop once they were officially checked-in. The show was also sponsored by Centaine, Bactroban and LiangMianZhen toothpaste.

== Cast ==
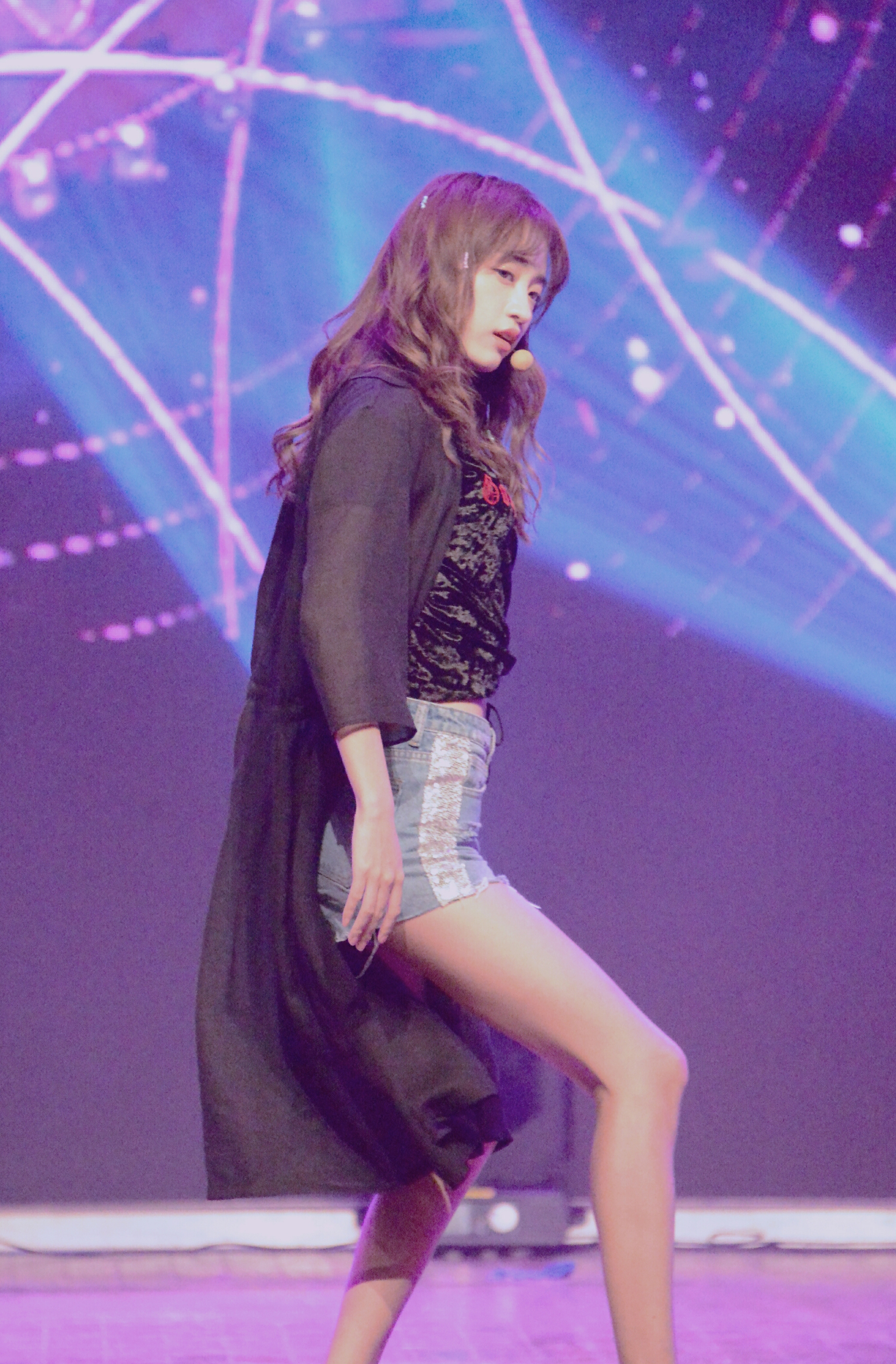
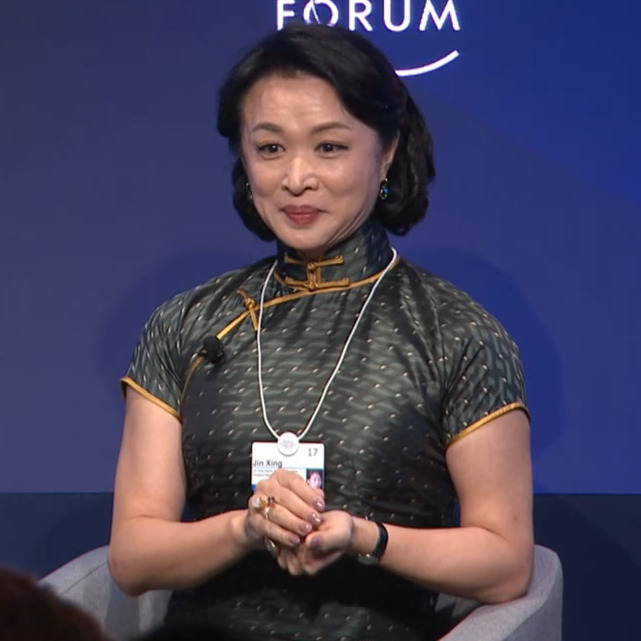
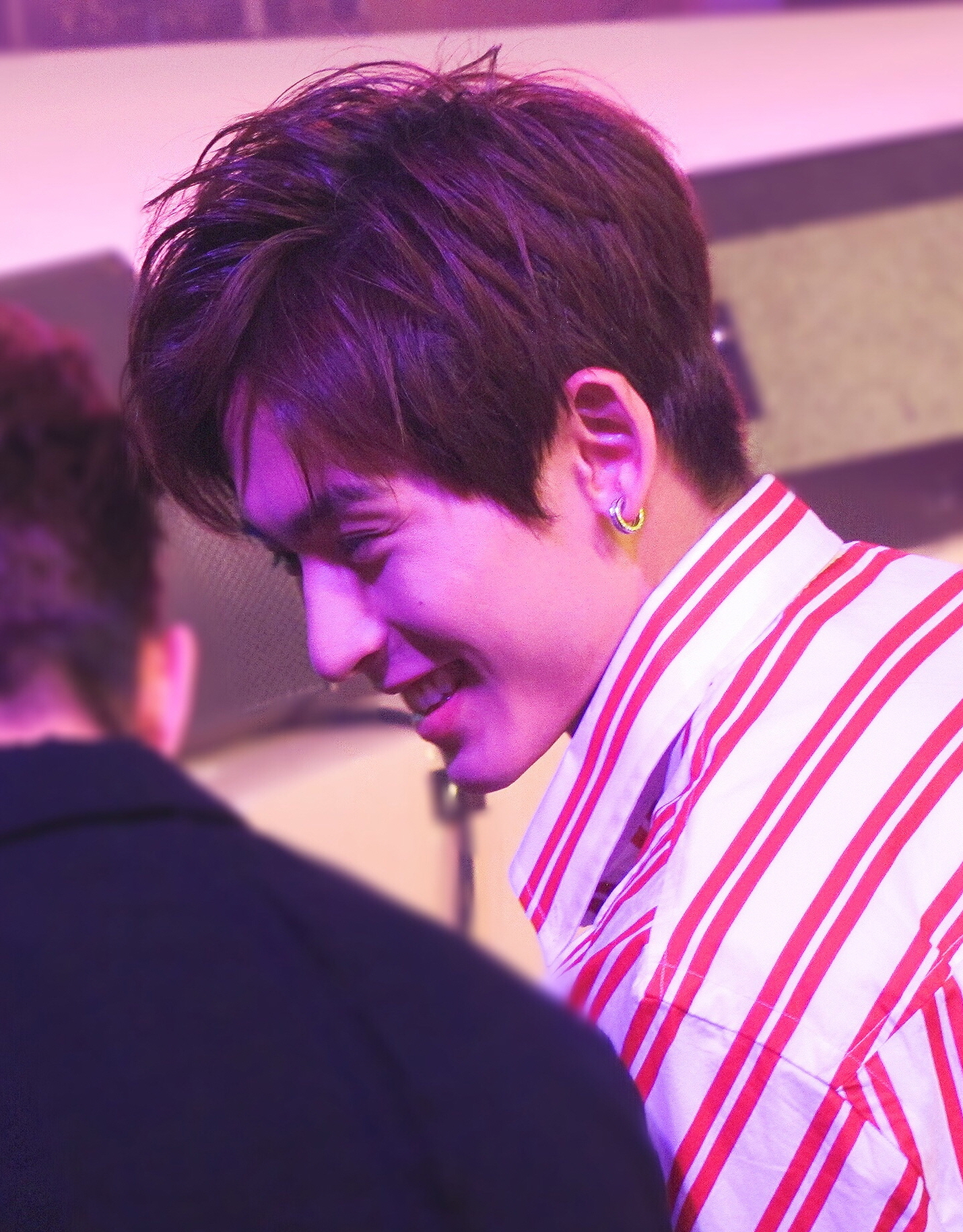
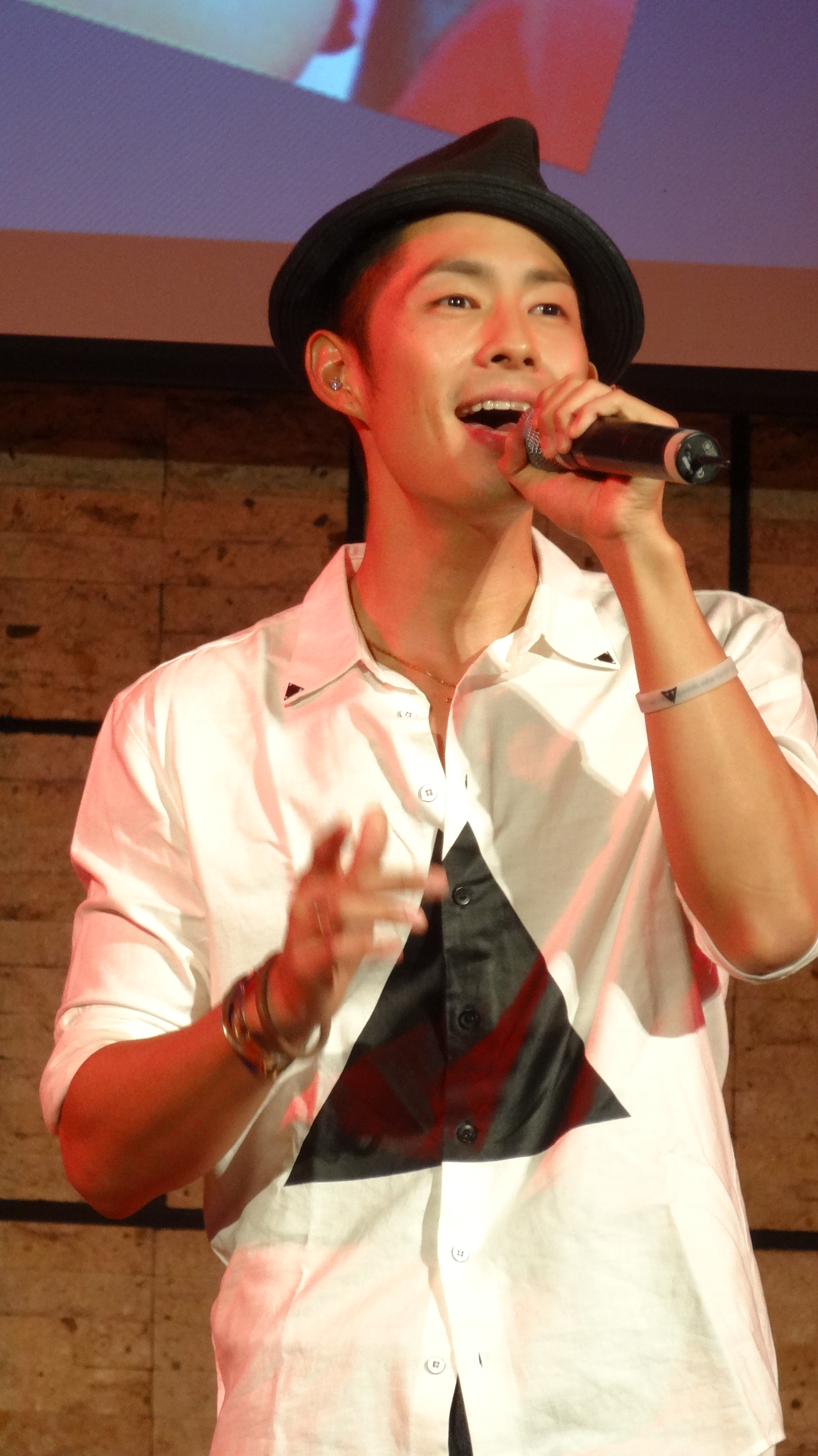
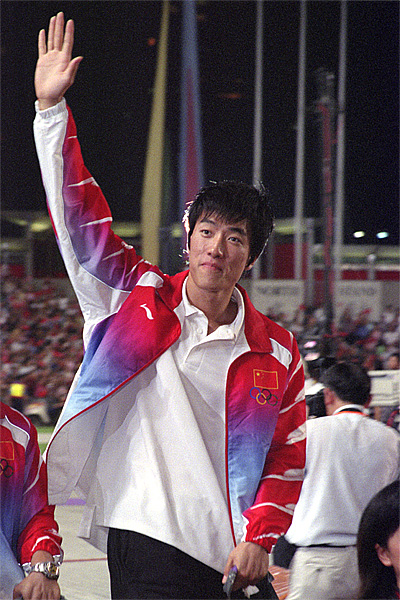
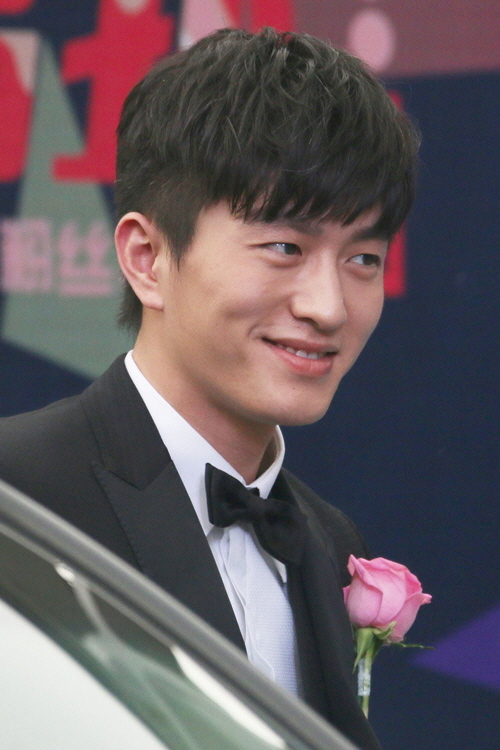
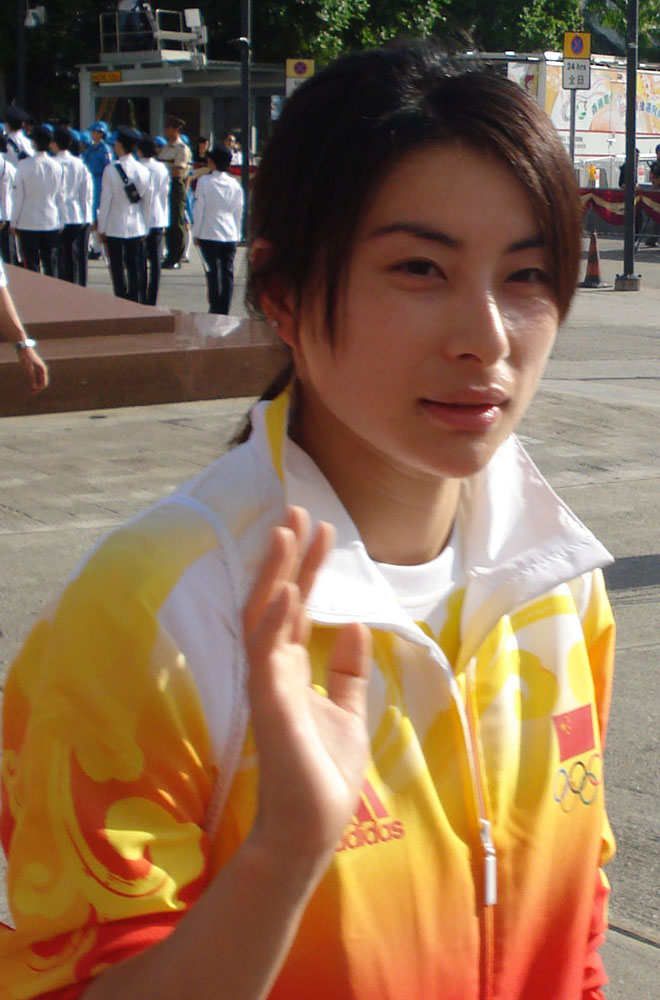
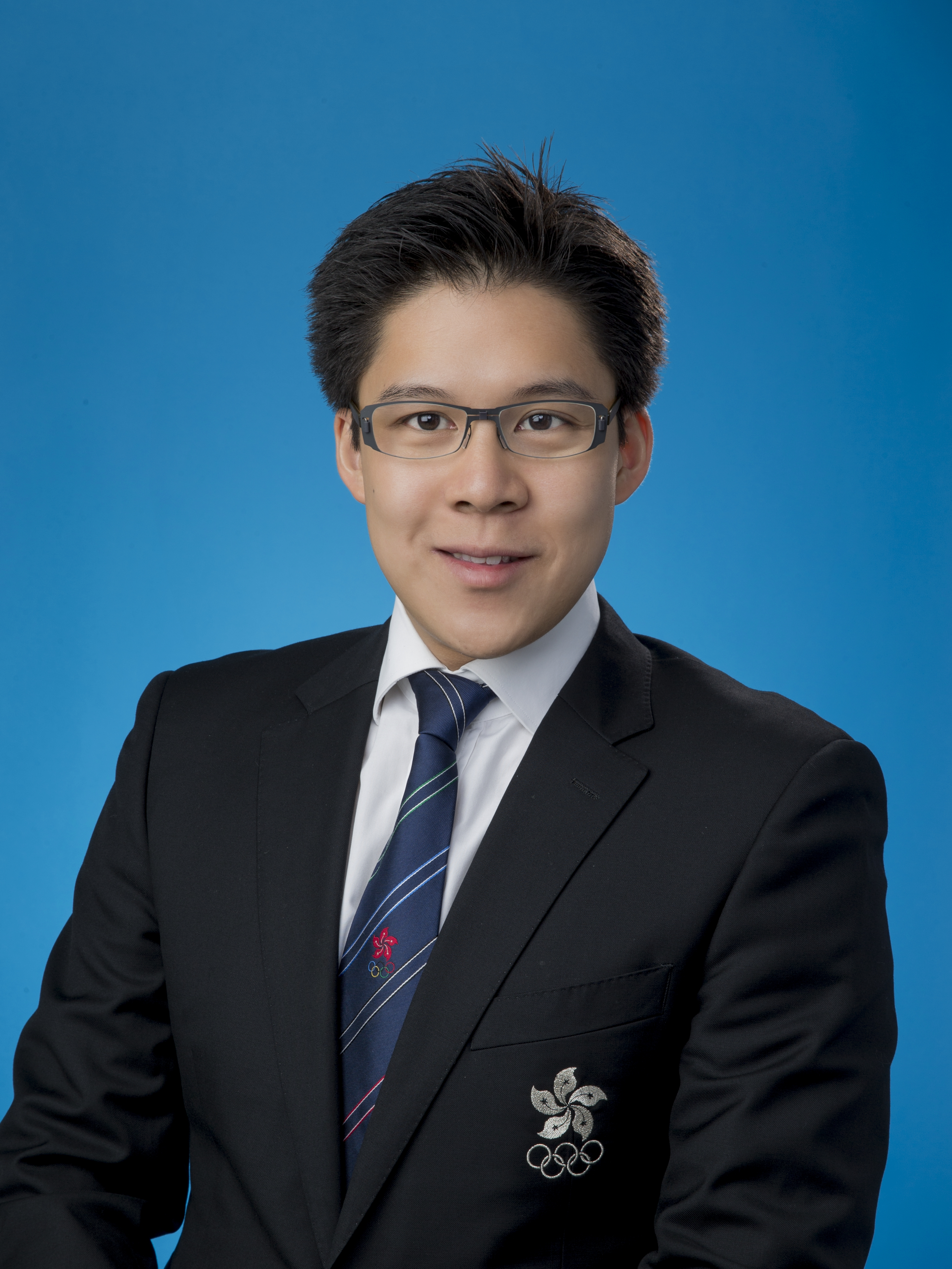
From left to right: Huang Tingting, Jin Xing, Zhang Zhehan, Wu Jianhao, Liu Xiang, Jin Dachuan, Guo Jingjing, and Huo Qigang

Similar to the first and second season, this season featured celebrities who were chosen to race on the show. Among which teams include a former Olympic diver, members from SNH48, and news anchors from Greater China Live. Taiwanese-American singer and former F4 members Wu Jianhao or Vanness Wu also involved in this season along with his sister, Yao Fengfeng or Melody.

Originally, Huang Jingyu and Xu Weizhou were cast, but were axed at the last minute for unknown reasons and were replaced by Season 1 racers Liu Chang & Jin Dachuan.

After Leg 2, upon the recommendation of doctors, Ji Longxiang (of Liu Xiang & Ji Longxiang) had to quit the show. Liu Xiang's partner and best friend Xu Qifeng replaced Ji starting on Leg 3.

Contestants	Age	Relationship	Notability	Status
Zhang Meixi (张美曦)	32	Fellow Broadcasters	Live Broadcast of Hong Kong, Macau and Taiwan host	Eliminated 1st (in Schwangau, Germany)
Zang Yafei (臧雅菲)	36	Fellow Broadcasters	—N/a	Eliminated 1st (in Schwangau, Germany)
Ji Longxiang (吉龙祥)		Liu Xiang's Cousin	—N/a	Medically Removed (in Tokyo, Japan)
Jin Xing (金星)	(Returned to competition)			Eliminated 2nd (in Fujikawaguchiko, Japan)
Heinz Gerd Oidtmann (汉斯)	(Returned to competition)			Eliminated 2nd (in Fujikawaguchiko, Japan)
Huang Tingting (黄婷婷)	24	Groupmates/SNH48	Singer / Actress	Eliminated 3rd (in Barcelona, Spain)
Sun Rui (孙芮)	21	Groupmates/SNH48	Singer / Actress	Eliminated 3rd (in Barcelona, Spain)
Jin Xing (金星)	48	Married	The Jin Xing Show host	Eliminated 4th (in Rome, Italy)
Heinz Oidtmann (汉斯)	48	Married	—N/a	Eliminated 4th (in Rome, Italy)
Zhang Zhehan (张哲瀚)	25	Partners/Actors	Actor / Singer	Eliminated 5th (in Santa Monica, United States)
Zhang Sifan (张思帆)	23	Partners/Actors	—N/a	Eliminated 5th (in Santa Monica, United States)
Wu Jianhao (吴建豪)	38	Siblings	Actor / Boyband member	Eliminated 6th (in San Juan Teotihuacán, Mexico)
Yao Fengfeng (姚凤凤)	25	Siblings	—N/a	Eliminated 6th (in San Juan Teotihuacán, Mexico)
Liu Xiang (刘翔)	33	Best Friends	Olympic hurdler	Third Place
Xu Qifeng (徐琦峰)	33	Best Friends	—N/a	Third Place
Jin Dachuan (金大川)	23	Partners/Models; The Amazing Race 1 (Chinese season)	Model / China Model Star contestant	Second Place
Liu Chang (刘畅)	30	Partners/Models; The Amazing Race 1 (Chinese season)	—N/a	Second Place
Guo Jingjing (郭晶晶)	34	Married	Olympic diver	Winners
Huo Qigang (霍启刚)	37	Married	Hong Kong council member	Winners

Future appearances

SNH48 racer Huang Tingting would later appear during the first leg of the next season as a replacement to another racer, who was unable to attend the tapings on that time.

== Results ==
The following teams participated in the season, each listed along with their placements in each leg and relationships as identified by the program. Note that this table is not necessarily reflective of all content broadcast on television, owing to the inclusion or exclusion of some data. Placements are listed in finishing order:

Team	Position (by leg)										Roadblocks performed
Team	1	2	3	4	5	6+	7	8+	9+	10	Roadblocks performed
Guo Jingjing & Huo Qigang	6th	6th	4th	3rd	3rd⊃	3rd	4th	1st	2nd	1st	Guo Jingjing 5, Huo Qigang 6
Liu Chang & Jin Dachuan	1st	2nd	2nd	2ndε^{5}	2nd⊃	5th	1st	4th	3rd	2nd	Liu Chang 4, Jin Dachuan 7
Liu Xiang & Xu Qifeng^{1} Liu Xiang & Ji Longxiang			3rd^{3}	5th	6th⊃^{8}^{,}^{11}	1st	3rd	3rd	1st−	3rd^{15}	Liu Xiang 7^{11}, Xu Qifeng 3, Ji Longxiang 1
Liu Xiang & Xu Qifeng^{1} Liu Xiang & Ji Longxiang	7th	4th									Liu Xiang 7^{11}, Xu Qifeng 3, Ji Longxiang 1
Wu Jianhao & Yao Fengfeng	3rd	5th	6th^{4}	1stƒ	1st⊃	4th−	2nd	2nd−	4th−^{14}		Wu Jianhao 5, Yao Fengfeng 4
Zhang Zhehan & Zhang Sifan	5th	1st	5th	4th^{6}	5th⊂^{12}	2nd	5th				Zhang Zhehan 4, Zhang Sifan 2
Jin Xing & Heinz	4th	3rd	7thε^{2}^{,}^{3}	7thß	4th^{10}^{,}^{11}	6th					Jin Xing 4^{2}^{,}^{11}, Heinz 3
Huang Tingting & Sun Rui	2nd	7th	1st	6th^{7}	7th^{9}^{,}^{13}						Huang Tingting 2, Sun Rui 4^{13}
Zhang Meixi & Zang Yafei	8th	8th									Zhang Meixi 2, Zang Yafei 1

Key

- A red team placement means the team was eliminated.
- A green ƒ indicates that the team won a Fast Forward.
- A purple ε indicates that the team decided to use an Express Pass on that leg.
- A blue team placement indicates that the team came in last but was not eliminated.
  - An underlined blue team's placement indicates that the team came in last on a non-elimination leg and had to perform a Speed Bump during the next leg.
- A fuchsia ß indicates that a team was brought back into the competition by means of the Return Ticket used on the previous leg.
- A brown ⊂ indicates the team who received a U-Turn; ⊃ indicates that the team voted for the recipient.
- An orange + next to a leg number indicates that there was a Face Off on that leg, while an orange − indicates the team that lost the Face Off and received a pre-determined time penalty.

Notes

1. Liu Xiang originally entered the competition with his cousin Ji Longxiang (吉龙祥). After Leg 2, it was determined that Ji was not medically fit to continue with the season. Starting on Leg 3, Ji was replaced by Liu's best friend Xu Qifeng.
2. Jin Xing & Heinz used the Express Pass given to them by Liu Chang & Jin Dachuan bypass the Roadblock on Leg 3. Before using the Express Pass, Jin Xing elected to perform the Roadblock; this is reflected in the total Roadblock count.
3. Liu Xiang & Xu Qifeng and Jin Xing & Heinz initially arrived 3rd and 5th respectively, but each teams were issued 30-minute penalties for quitting the sushi-eating task. Liu Xiang & Xu Qifeng's placement was not affected by the penalty, while the last two teams trailing Jin Xing & Heinz (Zhang Zhehan & Zhang Sifan and Wu Jianhao & Yao Fengeng) checked in during their penalty time, dropping Jin Xing & Heinz to last place; however, Zhang Zhehan & Zhang Sifan used their Return Ticket to save them from elimination.
4. Wu Jianhao & Yao Fengfeng initially arrived 1st, but they were issued two penalties totaling 75 minutes (a 1-hour penalty for forfeiting the sushi challenge entirely and a 15-minute penalty for not completing the Fujiyama challenge correctly). Five teams checked-in during their penalty time, dropping Wu Jianhao & Yao Fengfeng to 6th.
5. Liu Xiang & Xu Qifeng used their Express Pass to bypass the Detour on Leg 4.
6. Zhang Zhehan & Zhang Sifan initially arrived 3rd, but were issued a 30-minute penalty for hiring private transportation during this leg, breaking a rule which prohibits hitch-hiking. Guo Jingjing & Huo Qigang checked-in during the penalty time, dropping Zhang Zhehan & Zhang Sifan to 4th.
7. Huang Tingting & Sun Rui initially arrived 4th, but were issued a 30-minute penalty for crossing the red lights while on the way to the Military Edge Flower Detour. Zhang Zhehan & Zhang Sifan and Liu Xiang & Xu Qifeng checked-in during their penalty time, dropping Huang Tingting & Sun Rui to 6th.
8. Liu Xiang & Xu Qifeng were issued a 20-minute penalty for putting too many ingredients in their food at the paella task.
9. Huang Tingting & Sun Rui were issued a 10-minute penalty for not putting enough rice in their food at the paella task.
10. Jin Xing & Heinz were issued a 10-minute penalty for overcooking their food at the paella task.
11. Jin Xing & Heinz and Liu Xiang & Xu Qifeng initially arrived 2nd and 6th, respectively, but both teams were issued 1-hour penalties for quitting the Roadblock challenge. Liu Xiang & Xu Qifeng's placement were not affected by the penalty, while Liu Chang & Jin Dachuan and Guo Jingjing & Huo Qigang checked-in during Jin Xing & Heinz's penalty time, dropping them to 4th.
12. Zhang Zhehan & Zhang Sifan initially arrived 5th, but were issued a 30-minute penalty for not wearing their sleeping caps while performing the Sleepwalker Detour challenge. This did not affect their placement.
13. Huang Tingting & Sun Rui initially arrived 3rd, but were issued two penalties totaling 90 minutes (a 1-hour penalty for quitting the Roadblock challenge and a 30-minute penalty for not wearing their sleeping caps while performing the Sleepwalker Detour challenge). The last four teams trailing them checked-in during their penalty time, dropping Huang Tingting & Sun Rui to last place and resulting in their elimination.
14. Wu Jianhao & Yao Fengfeng initially arrived 2nd, but were issued a 30-minute penalty as Wu Jianhao had walked past the permitted distance where team members are required to remain in-between each other, which was specifically prohibited by the rules. Guo Jingjing & Huo Qigang and Liu Chang & Jin Dachuan checked-in during their penalty time, dropping Wu Jianhao & Yao Fengfeng to last place and resulting in their elimination.
15. Liu Xiang (of Liu Xiang & Xu Qifeng) elected to quit the final leg's Roadblock, but since they were the last team to arrive at the Finish Line, their 1-hour penalty were not issued.

== Race summary ==
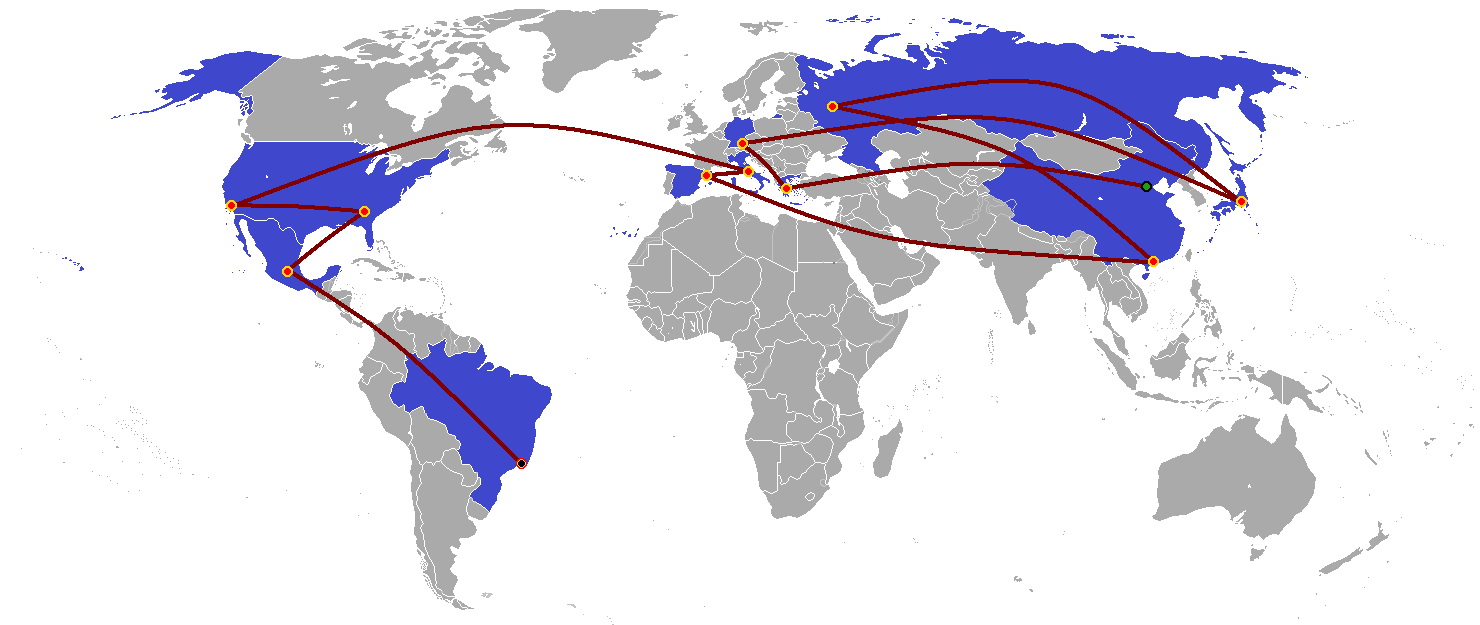
Race route map

Destinations	Air travel Rail travel Water travel Bus travel Helicopter travel Bicycle travel Gondola travel
Route Markers	绕道 (Detour) 路障 (Roadblock) 快进 (Fast Forward) 对抗 (Face Off) 联合 (Intersection) 回转 (U-Turn) 减速带 (Speed Bump) 中继站 (Pit Stop)

=== Leg 1 (China → Greece) ===
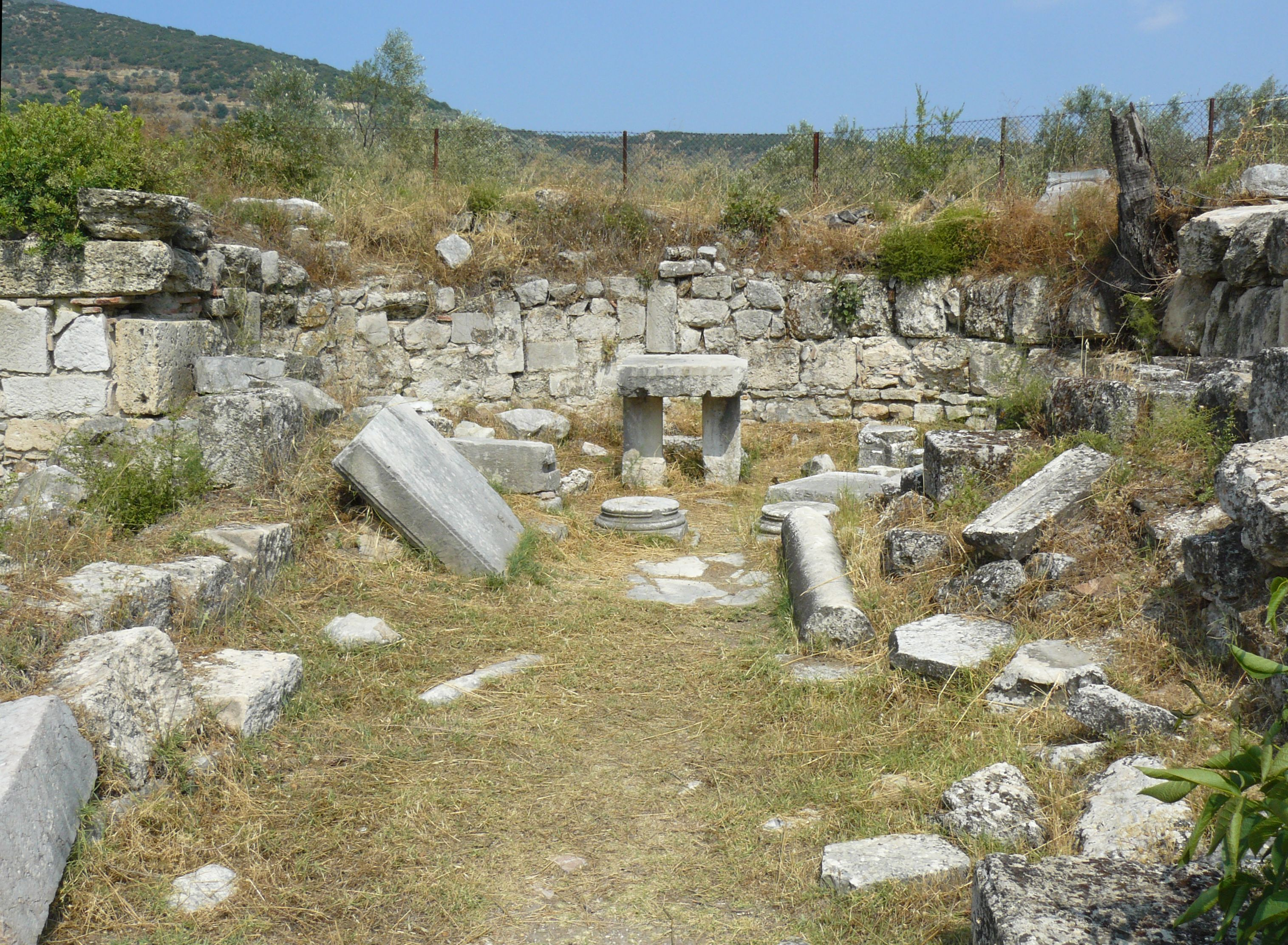
The ruins of Epidaurus near Athens, which hosted the 1896 and 2004 games, was the location of the first Detour.

- Episode 1 (8 July 2016)
- Prize: A deluxe dinner at the Hotel Grande Bretagne, a trip to Australia and New Zealand and two Express Passes (Note: The winning team keeps one for themselves and gives the second to another team before the end of the fifth leg.) (awarded to Liu Chang & Jin Dachuan)

Locations

- Beijing, China (Great Wall of China – Juyong Pass) (Starting Line)
- Beijing (Beijing National Stadium)
- Beijing (Beijing Capital International Airport Terminal 3 – Turkish Airlines Lounge)
- Beijing (Beijing Capital International Airport) → Athens, Greece (Athens International Airport)
- Argolis (Epidaurus)
- Athens (National and Kapodistrian University of Athens)
- Athens (Athens Olympic Stadium)
- Athens (Athens Olympic Stadium – Wall of Nations)

Episode summary

- Teams set off from Juyong Pass in Beijing and had to run up the Great Wall of China, grab a flag from one of eight warriors and bring it back down to a Ming dynasty warrior with their next clue, which directed them to the Beijing National Stadium.
- In this season's first Roadblock, one team member was harnessed and hoisted into the air, just like the dancers from the 2008 Summer Olympics opening ceremony, and had to make five forward flips while being raised upwards and five backwards flips while being lowered to receive their next clue.
- After the Roadblock, teams were driven to the airport, where they had to find the Turkish Airlines lounge and claim a departure time after landing in Athens, starting at 9:45 a.m. and continuing every three minutes, before receiving their next clue and leg money from Ronald McDonald. Once in Athens, teams then had to travel by taxi to Epidaurus in Argolis and find their next clue.
- This season's first Detour was a choice between Archimedes (阿基米德 – Ājīmǐdé) or Spartan Warriors (斯巴达勇士 – Sībādáyǒngshì). In Archimedes, teams have to solve a 14-piece tangramto receive their next clue. If teams found their puzzle too difficult, they had to hike to the top of the amphitheatreto receive a scroll showing the placement of two pieces. In Spartan Warriors, both team members had to throw a javelin into a haybale and throw a discus beyond a line to receive their next clue.
- After the Detour, teams had to travel to the National and Kapodistrian University of Athens and perform the changing of the guard routine of the Greek Presidential Guards known as Evzones to receive their next clue. Team then travelled to the Athens Olympic Stadium and were presented with a board filled with Chinese Olympic athletes and various Olympic sports. From this selection, they had to pick out the 10 gold medal winners and match them to their sport to receive their next clue, which directed them to the Pit Stop: the Wall of Nations.

Additional notes

- Luo Xuejuan appeared as the Pit Stop greeter during this leg, outside the stadium where she won a gold medal for women's 100 metre breaststroke at the 2004 Summer Olympics.
- This was a non-elimination leg.

=== Leg 2 (Greece → Germany) ===
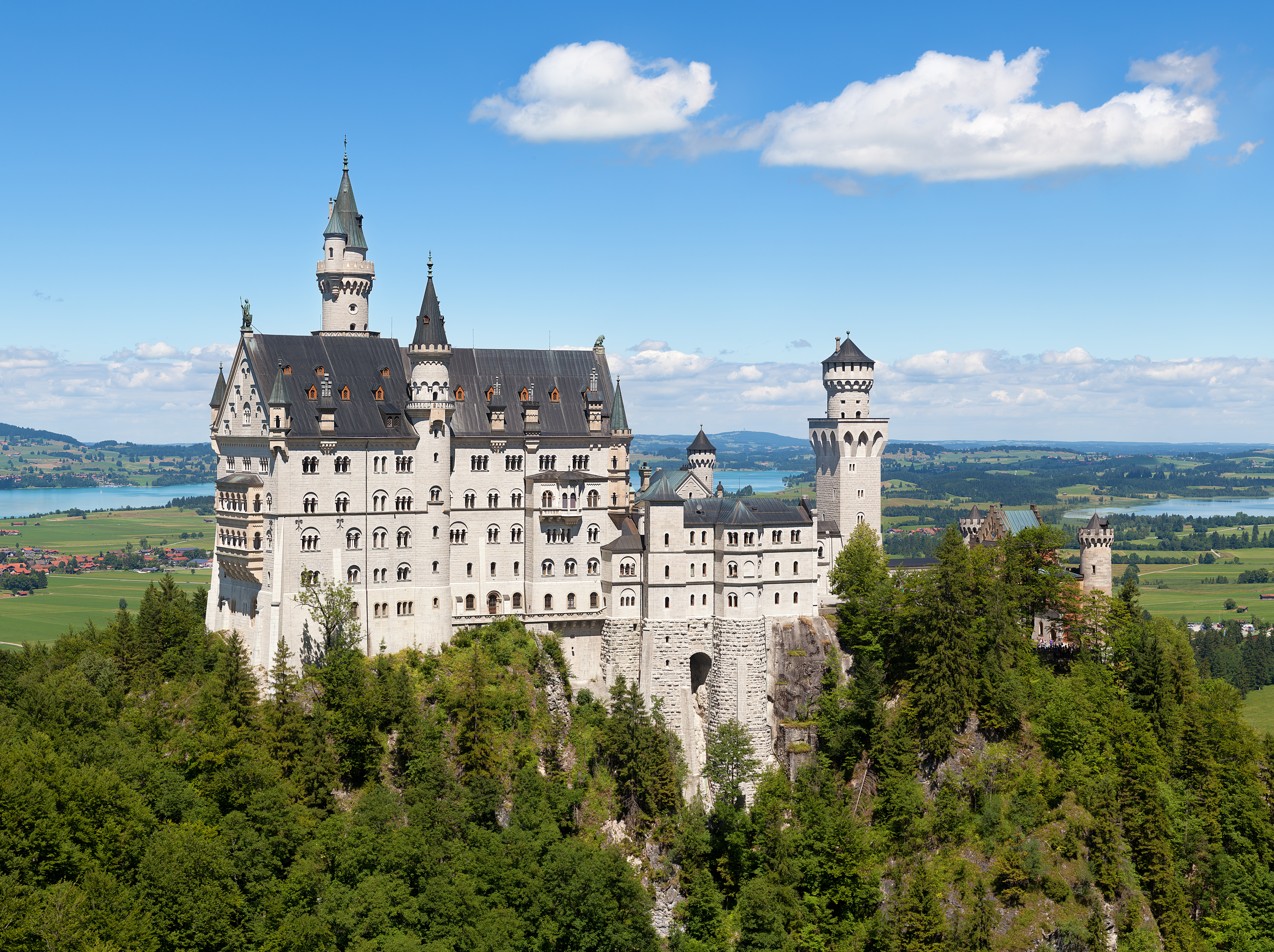
Teams ended the second leg near Bavaria's Neuschwanstein Castle outside of Munich, which hosted the 1972 games.

- Episode 2 (22 July 2016)
- Prize: A Return Ticket (Note: An item which a team may use to bring back an eliminated team before the end of the fourth leg.) and a trip to New Zealand and Australia (awarded to Zhang Zhehan & Zhang Sifan)
- Eliminated: Zhang Meixi & Zang Yafei

Locations

- Athens (Hotel Grande Bretagne)
- Athens (Athens International Airport) → Munich, Germany (Munich Airport)
- Munich (Englischer Garten – Chinesischer Turm)
- Munich (St. Peter's Church – Alter Peter Tower)
- Garmisch-Partenkirchen (Große Olympiaschanze)
- Garmisch-Partenkirchen (Bräustüberl Garmisch)
- Garmisch-Partenkirchen (Mohrenplatz or Werdenfelser Hof)
- Saulgrub (Forsthaus Unternogg)
- Schwangau (Bullachberg Castle (in German))

Episode summary

- At the start of this leg, teams were instructed to fly to Munich, Germany. Once there, teams found their next clue in the airport instructing them to travel by taxi to the Englischer Garten. There, teams had to pick a dachshund, then every team had to race with their dachshunds. The first team to finish the course received a stuffed toy Waldi listing the location of their next clue (St. Peter's Church), while the remaining teams had to wait five minutes for the next race. The last losing team had to wait five minutes before they could continue racing. After travelling to the church, teams had to climb 306 steps to the top of its tower and spot a marked car with their next clue.
- In this leg's first Roadblock, one team member had to ride a zipline and match a ski pose to receive their next clue.
- After the first Roadblock, teams were driven to their next clue at Bräustüberl Garmisch.
- For their Speed Bump, Zhang Meixi & Zang Yafei had to make and eat ten white sausage of the same size before they could continue racing.
- This leg's Detour was a choice between Cheers (干杯 – Gānbēi) or Revelry (狂欢 – Kuánghuān). In Cheers, teams had to carry twenty-two full beer stein through the Mohrenplatz without dropping a stein or spilling more than six of them past a line to receive their next clue. In Revelry, teams had to correctly perform the Schuhplattler dance to receive their next clue.
- In this leg's second Roadblock, the team member who did not perform the previous Roadblock had to serenade their partner with a Bavarian love song while perched on a ladder with the German pronunciations and key to receive their next clue. If racers were incorrect, a bucket of water was dumped on them.
- After the second Roadblock, teams had to check in at the Pit Stop: Bullachberg Castle, located beneath Neuschwanstein Castle, in Schwangau.

Additional note

- After this leg concluded, teams returned to China. During this time, Ji Longxiang was no longer medically cleared to continue racing, and Liu Xiang chose Xu Qifeng as his new partner.

=== Leg 3 (Japan) ===
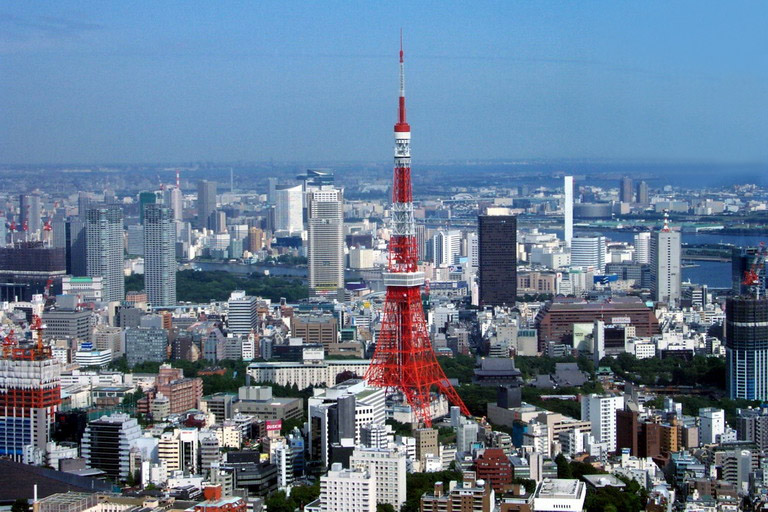
In Tokyo, which hosted the 1964 games, teams gathered at a television studio at the base of the Tokyo Tower to compete in a Japanese game show.

- Episode 3 (29 July 2016)
- Prize: A trip to Norway, Denmark and Iceland (awarded to Huang Tingting & Sun Rui)
- Medically removed: Ji Longxiang

Locations

- Tokyo, Japan (Odaiba Seaside Park)
- Tokyo (Star Rise Tower Studio (in Japanese))
- Tokyo (SIM Studio)
- Tokyo (Maidreamin & Shibuya Crossing or Shinjuku Central Park)
- Fujiyoshida (Fuji-Q Highland)
- Susono (Fuji Safari Park)
- Fujikawaguchiko (Yagizaki Park)

Episode summary

- Weeks later, teams flew to Tokyo, Japan, and gathered at the Odaiba Seaside Park. At the start of this leg, teams were instructed to find their next clue at the Star Rise Tower Studio. There, teams had to participate in a Japanese-style game show called "Wasabi Boom Boom". After the first team arrived, the host spun a wheel containing 18 stands with temaki, two which had two "wasabi bombs" (temaki-style sushi filled only with wasabi). If teams received the wasabi bombs, both team members had to eat one within two minutes to receive their next clue. If teams received a plain temaki, one team member had to eat it and play until they received the wasabi bombs. Teams then had to travel to the SIM Studio and execute five Judo techniques to receive their next clue.
- This leg's Detour based on two Japanese manga was a choice between Sailor Moon (美少女戰士 – Měishàonǚzhànshì) or Case Closed (名偵探柯南 – Míngzhēntànkēnán). In Sailor Moon, one team member had to dress as a character from series at the Maidreamin maid café, then teams had to search Shibuya Crossing for the character Tuxedo Mask, who had their next clue. In Case Closed, teams had to travel to Shinjuku Central Park. There, teams had to locate ten pieces of bones and teeth inside a simulated crime scene, mark each spot with a flag, measure the locations and correctly graph each piece to scale on an evidence sheet to receive their next clue.
- After the Detour, teams were driven to Fuji-Q Highland. There, teams had to ride Fujiyama and spot three people holding signs along the ride that, when combined, formed their next destination: 富士 生态 公园. Once the ride was complete, teams had to tell the message to the park manager to receive their next clue; otherwise, they had to ride the rollercoaster again.
- In this leg's Roadblock, one team member had to dress as a ninja and complete three ninja training courses – scaling a wall, navigating a rope course and throwing a shuriken – to receive their next clue. Jin Xing & Heinz used their gifted Express Pass to bypass this Roadblock.
- After the Roadblock, teams had to check in at the Pit Stop: Yagizaki Park in Fujikawaguchiko.

Additional note

- Jin Xing & Heinz arrived last at the Pit Stop; however, Zhang Zhehan & Zhang Sifan used their Return Ticket to save them from elimination.

=== Leg 4 (Japan → Russia) ===
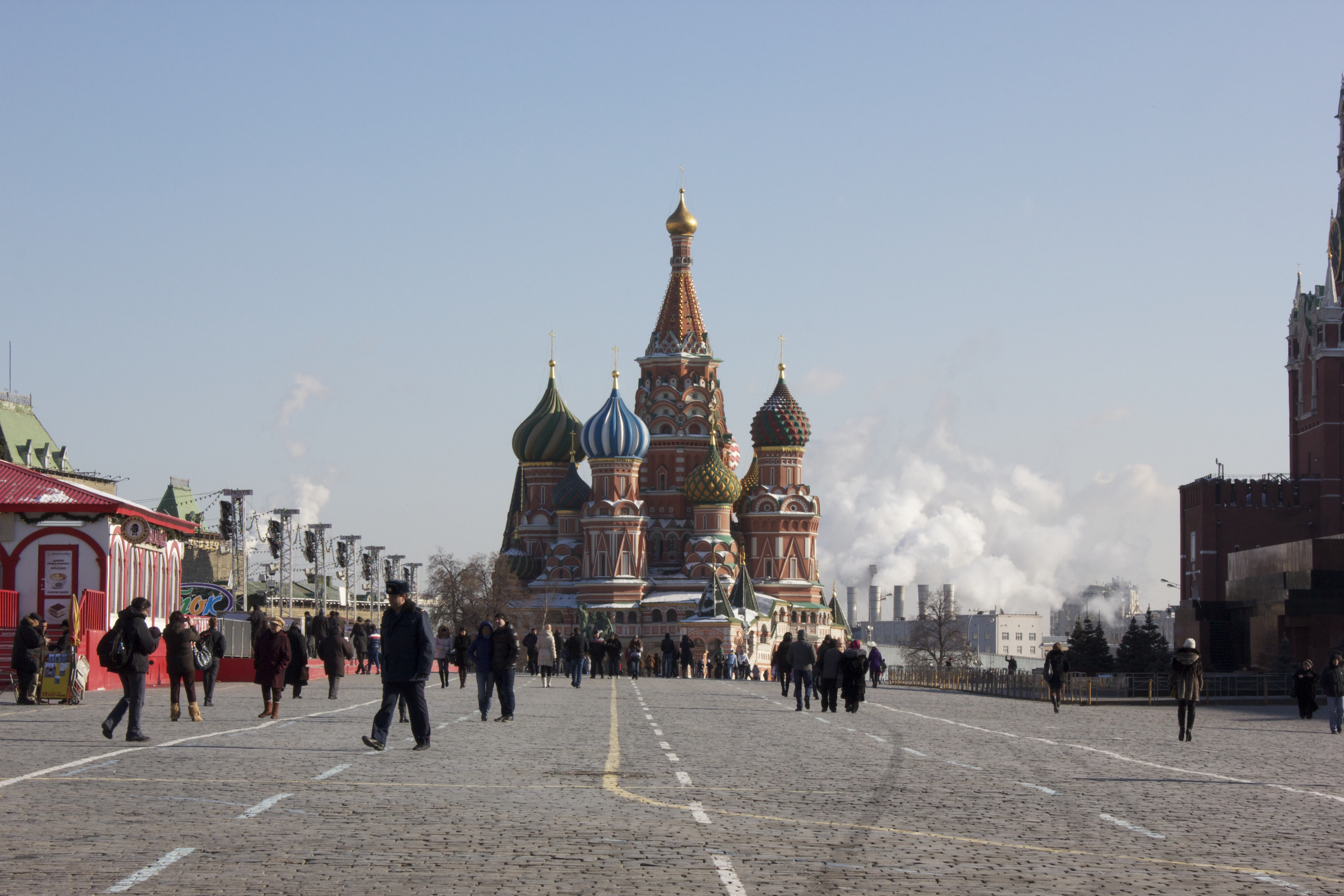
Near Saint Basil's Cathedral in Moscow, which hosted the 1980 games, teams checked into the Pit Stop at Red Square.

- Episode 4 (5 August 2016)
- Prize: A trip to France, Germany and Switzerland (awarded to Wu Jianhao & Yao Fengfeng)

Locations

- Tokyo (Narita International Airport) → Moscow, Russia (Sheremetyevo International Airport)
- Moscow (Swissôtel Krasnye Holmy)
- Moscow (Maly Krasnokholmsky Bridge)
- Moscow (хлеб Bakery)
- Moscow (Slavyanskaya Square)
  - Moscow (Moscow Circus on Tsvetnoy Boulevard)
- Moscow (Russian State Social University Swimming Pool or Korston Club Hotel)
- Moscow (Moscow State Pedagogical University)
- Moscow (Red Square)

Episode summary

- During the Pit Stop, teams flew to Moscow, Russia, and began the leg at the Swissôtel Krasnye Holmy. At the start of this leg, teams had to travel on foot to the Maly Krasnokholmsky Bridge, where both racers had to drink a shot of vodka while balancing it on a sabre to receive their next clue. Teams then had to travel via subway to a bakery and unload 20 bags of flour from a truck to receive their next clue, which directed them to travel via subway to Slavyanskaya Square.
- In this season's only Fast Forward, one team had to travel by taxi to the Moscow Circus on Tsvetnoy Boulevard and change into costumes. Then, one team member had to walk with a spinning plate to their partner, who had to bring back to the start. Once complete, both team members had to perform a four-part aerial routine. Wu Jianhao & Yao Fengfeng won the Fast Forward award: a Saint Basil's Cathedral figurine.
- This leg's Detour was a choice between Hibiscus Out of Water (水出芙蓉 – Shuǐchūfúróng) or Military Edge Flower (軍中緣花 – Jūnzhōngyuánhuā). In Hibiscus Out of Water, teams had to correctly perform a synchronised swimming routine with six swimmers of the Russian national developmental team to receive their next clue. In Military Edge Flower, teams had to dress up as Russian soldiers and correctly perform the Trepak dance to receive their next clue. Liu Chang & Jin Dachuan used their Express Pass to bypass this Detour.
- After the Detour, teams found their next clue at the Moscow State Pedagogical University.
- In this leg's Roadblock, one team member was shown a slideshow showing the time and time zone of either Los Angeles, Rio de Janeiro or London, a map of Russia's nine different time zones with their UTC offsets and a blank Russian time zone map with several other cities highlighted. After the show, racers had to fill in the corresponding local times for any five cities within an allotted time period to receive their next clue, which directed them to the Pit Stop: Red Square.

Additional notes

- This was a non-elimination leg.
- After this leg concluded, teams returned to China.

=== Leg 5 (China → Hong Kong → Spain) ===
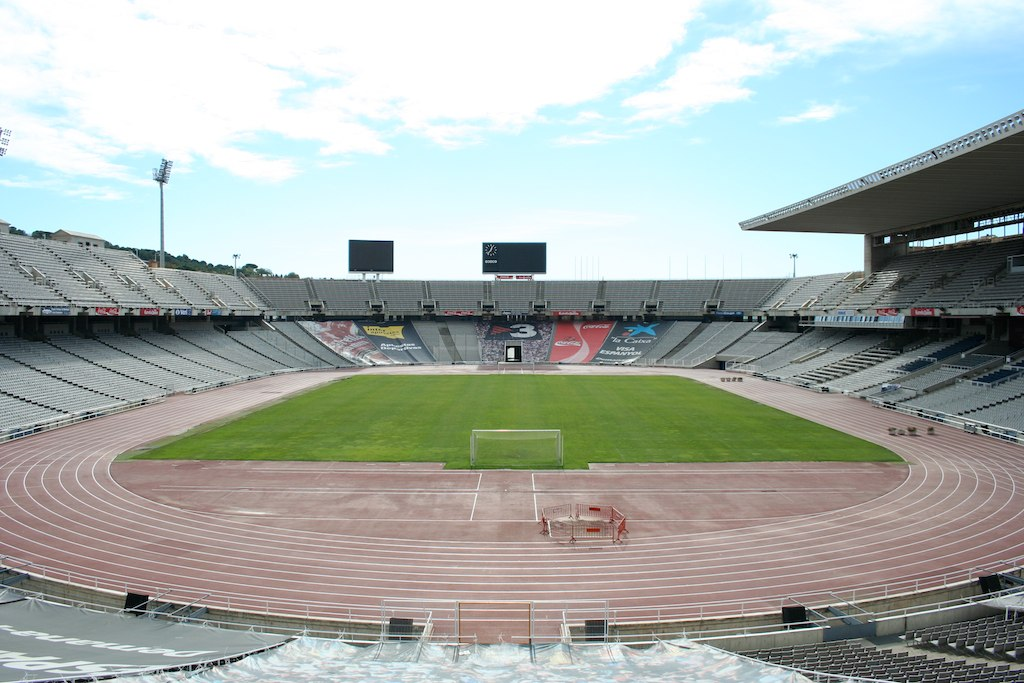
Barcelona's Estadi Olímpic Lluís Companys, which was the main venue of the 1992 Summer Olympics, was the fifth Pit Stop.

- Episode 5 (12 August 2016)
- Prize: A trip to the United States, United Kingdom and Brazil (awarded to Wu Jianhao & Yao Fengfeng)
- Eliminated: Huang Tingting & Sun Rui

Locations

- Zhuhai, Guangdong (By-Health Production Factory)
- Zhuhai (Jiuzhou Port) → Hong Kong (Skypier)
- Hong Kong (Hong Kong International Airport) → Barcelona, Spain (Barcelona–El Prat Airport)
- Barcelona (Plaza de Gaudí (in Spanish))
- Barcelona (Gran Teatre del Liceu or Port Vell)
- Barcelona (Mirador de Colon)
- Barcelona (Mercat de la Barceloneta)
- Barcelona (The Serras Hotel Barcelona)
- Mollet del Vallès (Camp de Tir Olímpic de Mollet)
- Barcelona (Estadi Olímpic Lluís Companys)

Episode summary

- Weeks later, teams gathered at the By Health Production Factory in Zhuhai, Guangdong. At the start of this leg, teams had to search the factory with 100 mascots for 12 most recent Summer Olympic Games mascots and place them in the corresponding shelves of the host cities to receive their next clue and their flight tickets. The first four teams received tickets on the first flight, with the remaining teams on the second flight.

Year	City	Mascot	Year	City	Mascot
1972	Munich	Waldi	1996	Atlanta	Izzy
1976	Montreal	Amik	2000	Sydney	Olly, Syd and Millie
1980	Moscow	Misha	2004	Athens	Athena and Phevos
1984	Los Angeles	Sam	2008	Beijing	Fuwa
1988	Seoul	Hodori	2012	London	Wenlock
1992	Barcelona	Cobi	2016	Rio	Vinicius

- Once in Barcelona, teams had to search the airport's arrivals terminal for their next clue, which directed them to Plaza de Gaudí next to Sagrada Família.
- For their Speed Bump, Jin Xing & Heinz had to each don a Spanish giant costume and walk around the plaza before they could continue racing.
- This leg's Detour was a choice between Torero (斗牛士 – Dòuniúshì) or Sleepwalker (梦游者 – Mèngyóuzhě). In Torero, teams had to travel to the Gran Teatre del Liceu, watch a medley of songs from the opera Carmen and then both team members had to correctly answer a question about the opera to receive their next clue. In Sleepwalker, teams had to travel to Port Vell, where both team members had to don a sleeping hat and carry a bed to the starting line. Then, teams had to convince locals to carry them 400 metres (1,300 ft) to the finish line to receive their next clue. If either the teams or the bed touch the ground, teams had to ask new locals for help.
- After the Detour, teams found the U-Turn reveal board and their next clue at the Mirador de Colon. After travelling to Mercat de la Barceloneta, teams had to memorise and purchase the ingredient listed at the entrance written in Spanish. Teams then had to travel to the Serras Hotel Barcelona, make paella and sample some before receiving their next clue. Teams received a 10-minute penalty for every mistake.
- In this leg's Roadblock, teams had to travel to Camp de Tir Olímpic de Mollet, where one team member had to shoot down five clay targets with a shotgun to receive their next clue. Each round had five shots, and racers' scores carried over to the next round.
- After the Roadblock, teams had to check in at the Pit Stop: the Estadi Olímpic Lluís Companys.

Additional notes

- This leg featured a U-Turn Vote. Before teams began this leg, they had to vote in secret for a team to be U-Turned. Zhang Zhehan & Zhang Sifan Leigh received the most votes. The teams' votes were as follows:

Team	Vote
Wu Jianhao & Yao Fengfeng	Zhang Zhehan & Zhang Sifan
Liu Chang & Jin Dachuan	Zhang Zhehan & Zhang Sifan
Guo Jingjing & Huo Qigang	Zhang Zhehan & Zhang Sifan
Zhang Zhehan & Zhang Sifan	Wu Jianhao & Yao Fengfeng
Liu Xiang & Xu Qifeng	Zhang Zhehan & Zhang Sifan
Huang Tingting & Sun Rui	Wu Jianhao & Yao Fengfeng
Jin Xing & Heinz	Wu Jianhao & Yao Fengfeng

- Paralympic archer Antonio Rebollo, who lit the 1992 Summer Olympic flame during the opening ceremony by shooting a flaming arrow, appeared as a Pit Stop greeter during this leg.

=== Leg 6 (Spain → Italy) ===
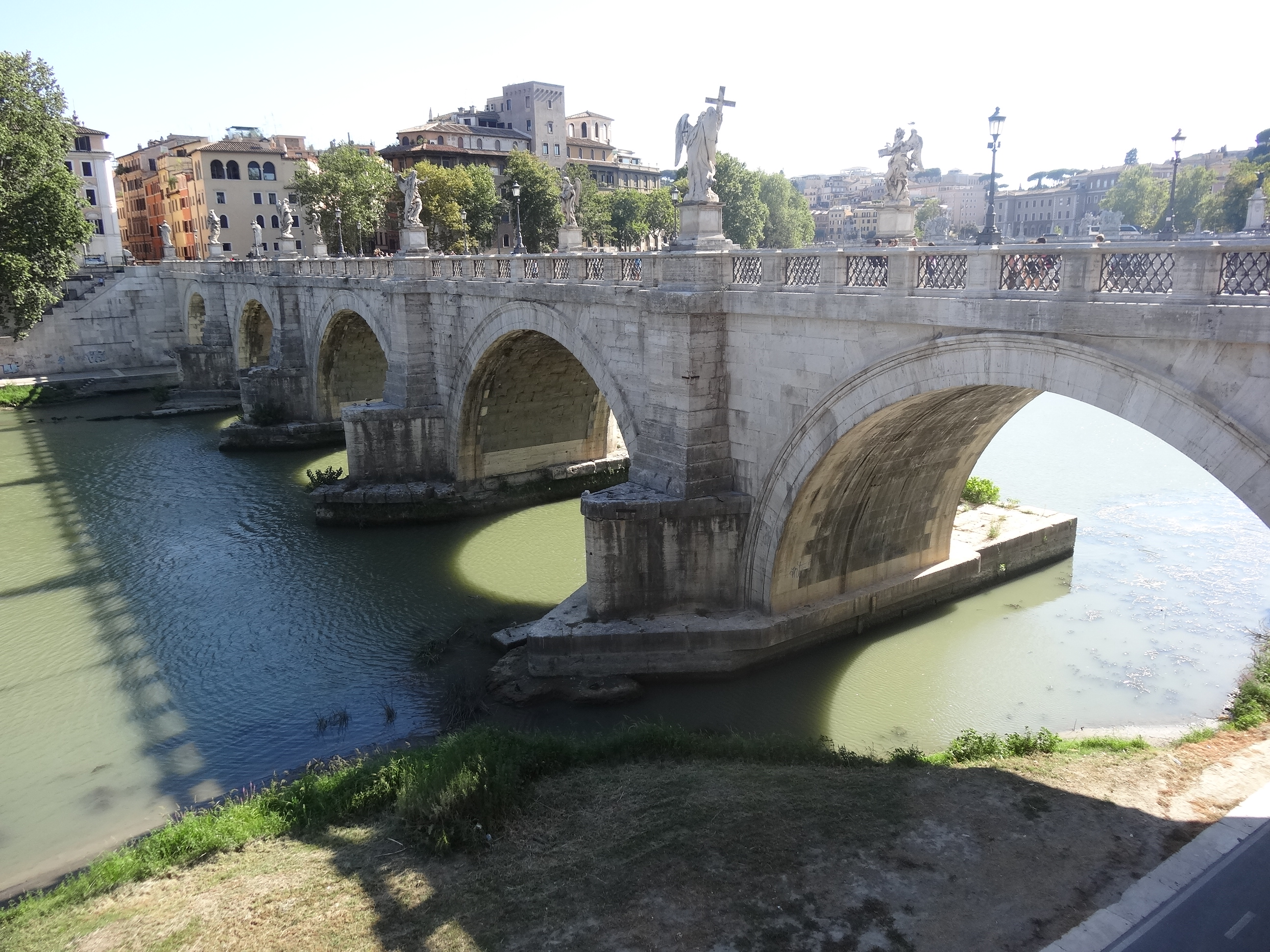
Teams ended the sixth leg on Rome's Ponte Sant'Angelo.

- Episode 6 (19 August 2016)
- Prize: A trip to Japan, South Korea and Singapore (awarded to Liu Xiang & Xu Qifeng)
- Eliminated: Jin Xing & Heinz

Locations

- Barcelona (Barcelona–El Prat Airport) → Rome, Italy (Leonardo da Vinci–Fiumicino Airport)
- Rome (Crowne Plaza Rome - St. Peter's)
- Rome (Trevi Fountain)
- Rome (Pinacoteca del Tesoriere)
- Rome (Parco del Celio)
- Rome (Stadio delle Terme di Caracalla)
- Rome (Piazza Navona or Parco Lineare Integrato delle Mura)
- Rome (Ponte Sant'Angelo)

Episode summary

- During the Pit Stop, teams flew to Rome, Italy, and began the leg at the Crowne Plaza Rome - St. Peter's. At the start of this leg, teams had to travel to the Trevi Fountain, make a wish with a 1 euro coin and then find impersonators of Gregory Peck and Audrey Hepburn from Roman Holiday, who gave them their next clue and a puzzle box.
- In this leg's Roadblock, one team member had to choose a mask and search through a masquerade ball for a guest wearing the same mask to receive their next clue.
- After the Roadblock, teams had to travel to Parco del Celio, choose a gladiator and learn a staged gladiator fight. When facing off against the champion gladiator, the first team member had to lose their match, while the other team member had to win receive their next clue, which directed them to the Stadio delle Terme di Caracalla.
- For this season's first Face Off, two teams competed in three Olympic track and field events: 110 metres hurdles, racewalking and long jump. Each team member had to compete in at least one event. The first team to win two events received their next clue while the losing team had to wait for another team. The last team had to wait for an hourglass to empty before they could continue racing.
- This leg's Detour was a choice between Roman Numerals (罗马数字 – (Luómǎ Shùzì) or Roman Trebuchet (罗马炮架 – Luómǎ Pào Jià). In Roman Numerals, teams had to count three specific things in Piazza Navona: the number of balloons attached to a vendor's bike (56), the number of bearded men on the three fountains' statues (14) and the number of paintings from four art vendors that depicted events from previous legs (28). Teams then had to write the numbers into a provided equation [(56 + 14) x 28], solve it (1960) and write the answer in Roman numerals (MCMLX) to receive their next clue. In Roman Trebuchet, teams had to assemble a trebuchet and launch a cannonball past a marked line to receive their next clue.
- Each clue envelope during this leg contained letters ('L,' 'E,' 'N,' 'G' and 'A') needed to unlock the puzzle box, which contained the name of the Pit Stop – Ponte Sant'Angelo – in mirror writing, by unscrambling the letters to spell out "ANGEL".

Additional note

- After this leg concluded, teams returned to China.

=== Leg 7 (United States) ===
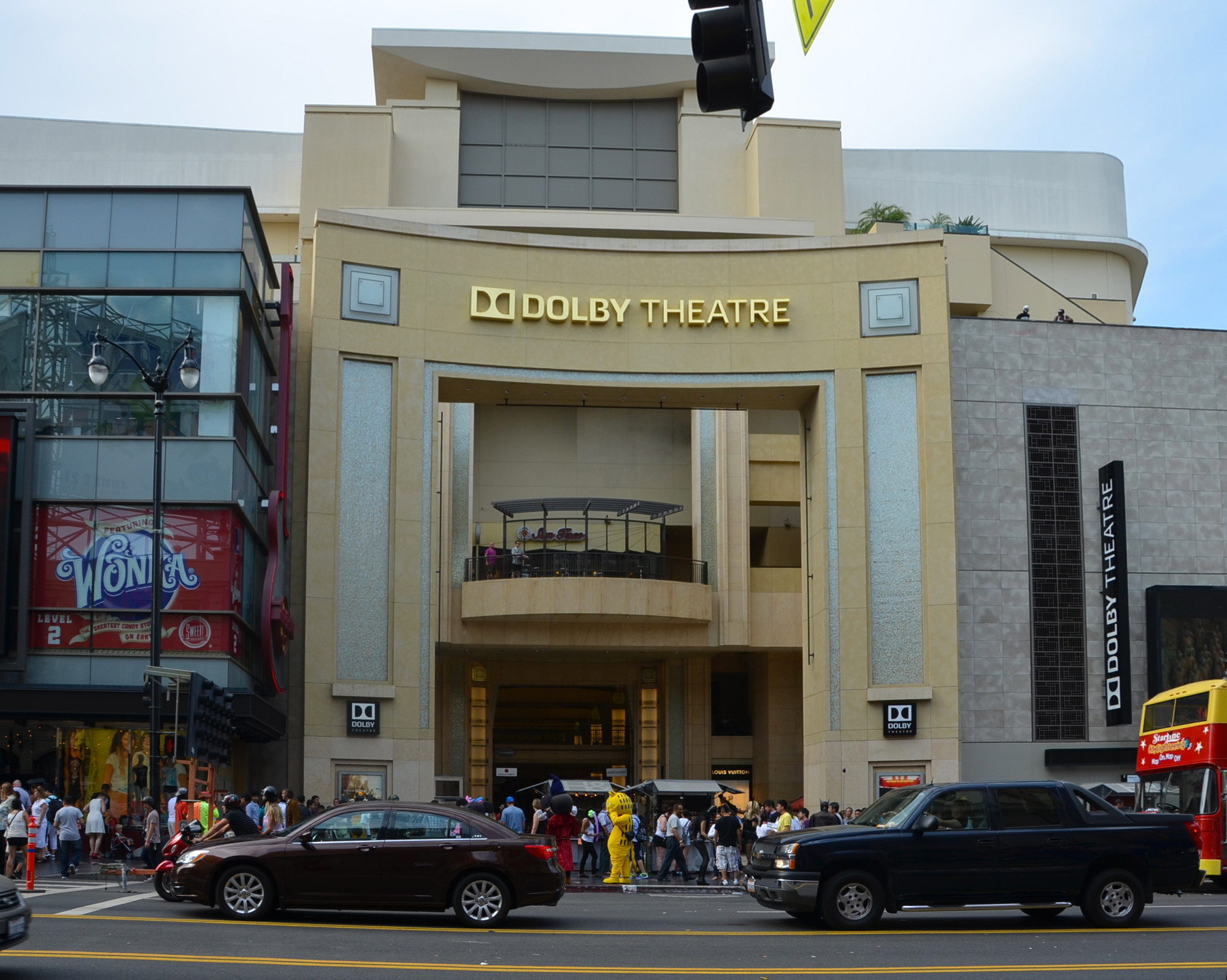
While in Los Angeles, which hosted the 1932 and 1984 games, teams visited Dolby Theatre in Hollywood and assembled Lego bricks.

- Episode 7 (26 August 2016)
- Prize: A trip to Norway, Denmark and Iceland (awarded to Liu Chang & Jin Dachuan)
- Eliminated: Zhang Zhehan & Zhang Sifan

Locations

- Marina del Rey, United States (Burton Chace Park)
- Marina del Rey (Mother's Beach)
- Los Angeles (Dolby Theatre)
- Los Angeles (Griffith Park – Bronson Caves)
- Universal City (Universal Studios Lot)
- Los Angeles (Loyola Marymount University – Burns Recreation Center or Gersten Pavilion)
- Santa Monica (Santa Monica Beach)

Episode summary

- Weeks later, teams flew to Los Angeles in the United States and gathered at Burton Chace Park in Marina del Rey. At the start of this leg, teams were instructed to pedal a water bike through the marina to their next clue at Mother's Beach. Teams then had to drive to the Dolby Theatre and assemble a replica of an Oscar award using a set of Lego bricks to receive a fake Oscar with the address of their next clue printed on the bottom from a Nicole Kidman impersonator.
- In this leg's Roadblock, one team member had to climb a rope ladder to a hanging platform, walk onto a beam, jump off and grab both halves of a hanging clue.
- After the Roadblock, teams had to drive to the Universal Studios Lot, don costumes and memorise a script for a Western action movie. One team member played a cowboy named Bill, while the other played the damsel in distress Rose. Teams had to correctly follow the script including English dialogue, stunt fighting and falls, gun-slinging and falls and a final explosion to receive their next clue.
- This leg's Detour was a choice between Mid Court (中场 – Zhōng Chǎng) or Full Court (全场 – Quán Chǎng). In Mid Court, teams had to perform a Laker Girls cheerleading routine set to the sing "Mickey" to receive the next clue. In Full Court, teams had to complete an NBA official skill challenge, where both team members had to perform an alley-oop, dribble through an obstacle course, perform a bounce pass into a vertical hoop and perform a free throw and a 3-point shot at the side of the hoop, within four minutes to receive the next clue.
- After the Detour, teams had to check in at the Pit Stop: Santa Monica Beach in Santa Monica.

=== Leg 8 (United States) ===
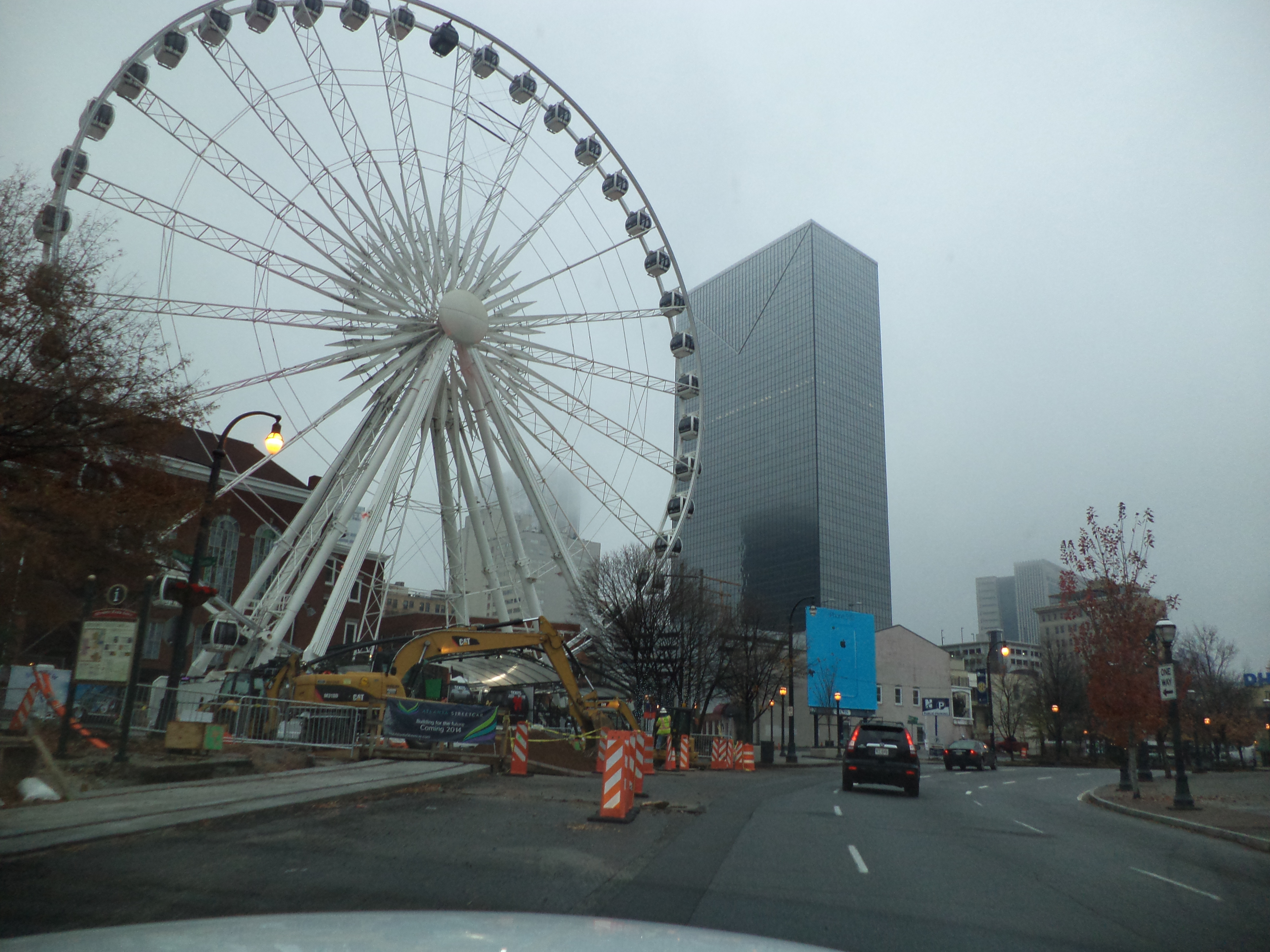
The Georgian leg began at the SkyView Ferris wheel in Atlanta, which hosted the 1996 games.

- Episode 8 (2 September 2016)
- Prize: A trip to Denmark, Italy and Poland (awarded to Guo Jingjing & Huo Qigang)

Locations

- Los Angeles (Los Angeles International Airport) → Atlanta (Hartsfield–Jackson Atlanta International Airport)
- Atlanta (Centennial Olympic Park – SkyView Atlanta)
- Villa Rica (Stockmar Airport)
- Tallapoosa (West GA Mud Park)
- Atlanta (Abrams Fixture Corporation or Blind Willie's Blues Bar)
- Stone Mountain (Stone Mountain Park Plantation Meadow)
- Stone Mountain (Stone Mountain Summit)

Episode summary

- During the Pit Stop, teams flew to Atlanta and began this leg at the SkyView Atlanta. At the start of this leg, one team member was harnessed to a net connected to the Ferris wheel's support beams, while the other racer was inside a capsules. When the wheel was in motion, racers had to grab four ribbons with math equations surrounding the net's frame and relay the equations and/or the answers to their partner. Two of the answers to the math equations were the codes needed to unlock a briefcase, which contained their next clue. Teams then had to drive to the Stockmar Airport in Villa Rica. There, one team member flew in a small airplane and, with their partner guiding them via walkie-talkie on the ground, had to drop flour bombs onto two targets to receive their next clue, which directed them to the West GA Mud Park in Tallapoosa. Only one team could fly at a time, and teams had four flour bombs for each attempt.
- For this leg's Face Off, one team member from each team had to ride in a monster truck while holding a large container of water and prevent the water from spilling out. The team who lost less water received their next clue while the losing team had to wait for another team. The last team had to wait for an hourglass to empty before they could continue racing.
- This season's final Detour was a choice between Color (色彩 – Sècǎi) or Beat (节拍 – Jiépāi). In Color, which only had three stations, teams had to correctly re-create a piece of local graffiti art to the satisfaction of the artist to receive their next clue. In Beat, teams had to sing the blues song "Wang Dang Doodle" to the satisfaction of the audience to receive their next clue.
- After the Detour, teams had to drive to the Stone Mountain Park plantation meadow and score 100 cumulative points in archery to receive their next clue, which directed them to the Pit Stop: the summit of Stone Mountain. Each team member had six arrows and two rounds to use them within four minutes.

Additional note

- This was a non-elimination leg.

=== Leg 9 (United States → Mexico) ===
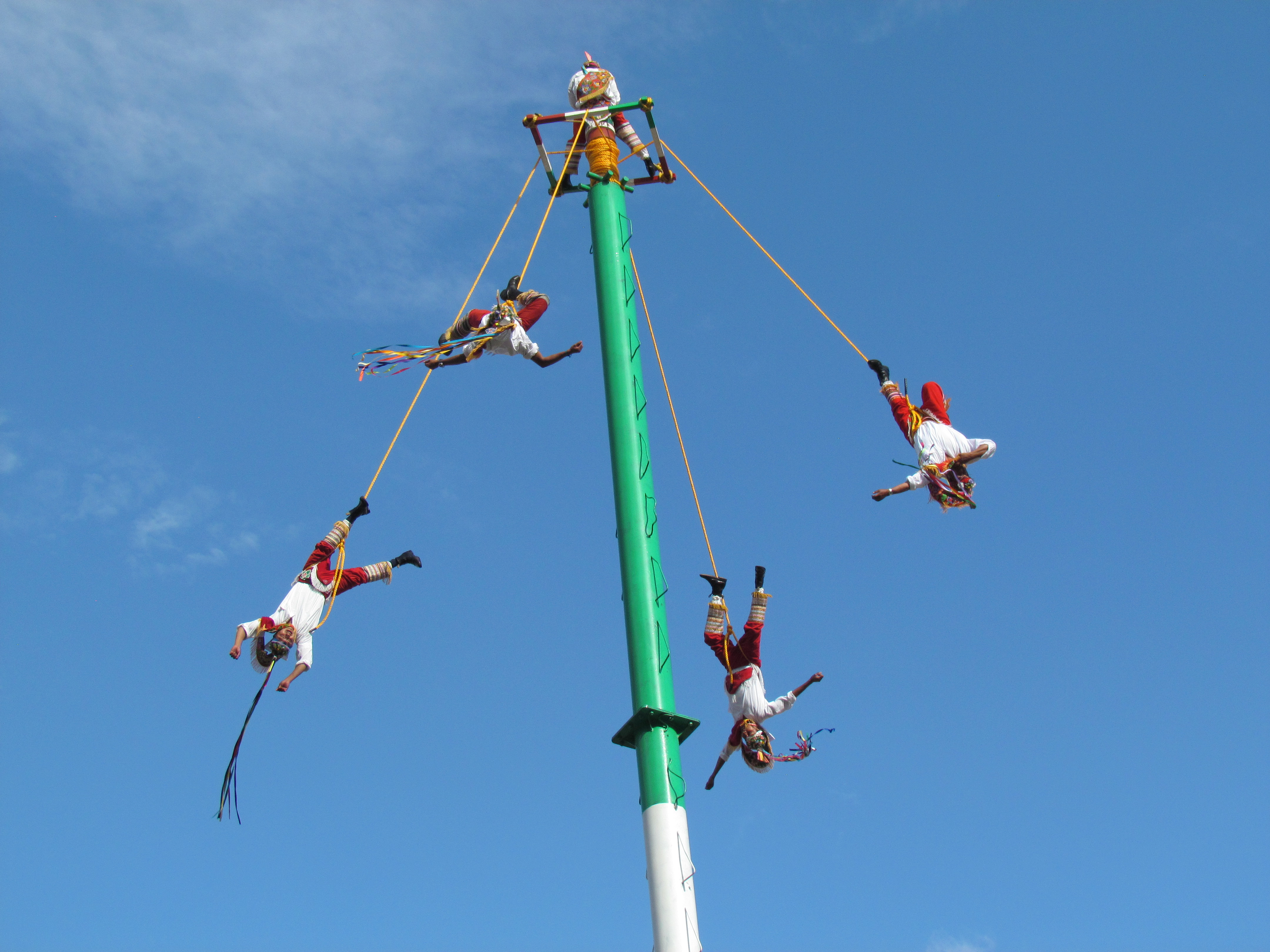
In the first Roadblock in Mexico City, which hosted the 1968 games, one team member had to fly with the Voladores de Papantla.

- Episode 9 (9 September 2016)
- Prize: A trip to the United States, Switzerland and France (awarded to Guo Jingjing & Huo Qigang)
- Eliminated: Wu Jianhao & Yao Fengfeng

Locations

- Atlanta (Hartsfield–Jackson Atlanta International Airport) → Mexico City, Mexico (Mexico City International Airport)
- Mexico City (Mexican Olympic Committee Headquarters – Mexican Olympic Sports Center)
- Mexico City (National Museum of Anthropology)
- Mexico City (Mercado de San Juan)
- Mexico City (Plaza Garibaldi & Escuela de Mariachi Ollin Yoliztli Garibaldi)
- San Martín Centro (Cactus Farm)
- San Juan Teotihuacán (Jardin de las Cactaceas)

Episode summary

- During the Pit Stop, teams flew to Mexico City, Mexico, and began this leg at the Mexican Olympic Sports Center.
- At the start of this leg, teams encountered a combined Intersection and Face Off. The winning team from the previous leg determined the team pair-ups to compete in a 4 × 100 metres relay race. The teams were paired up thusly: Guo Jingjing & Huo Qigang and Liu Chang & Jin Dachuan, and Liu Xiang & Xu Qifeng and Wu Jianhao & Yao Fengfeng. The losing joined teams had to serve a 15-minute penalty while the winning teams continued racing. After this task, teams were no longer joined.
- In this leg's first Roadblock, teams had to travel to the National Museum of Anthropology and find the Voladores de Papantla. Then, one team member had to climb a 32-metre (105 ft) pole and swing around the pole suspended on ropes to the ground for five minutes to receive their next clue.
- After the first Roadblock, teams had to travel to the Mercado de San Juan, where both team members had to eat one bowl of fried insects and peppers, each with varying degrees of pungency, to receive their next clue.
- For their Speed Bump, Liu Chang & Jin Dachuan had to make 20 tortillas before they could continue racing.
- Teams then had to travel to the Plaza Garibaldi, search among 350 Mariachi performers for one who was faking their performance of "Cielito Lindo" and take the performer to a judge to receive their next clue.
- In this leg's second Roadblock, the team member who did not perform the previous Roadblock had to put on a dress made of balloons, follow a marked path through a field of cacti and find a sombrero, which they could exchange for their next clue. Teams received a penalty based on how many balloons popped or were lost.
- After the second Roadblock, teams had to assemble a puzzle of a Mesoamerican mask at Jardin de las Cactaceas to receive an embroidered map directing them to the Pit Stop, which they had to search for on foot.

=== Leg 10 (Mexico → Brazil) ===
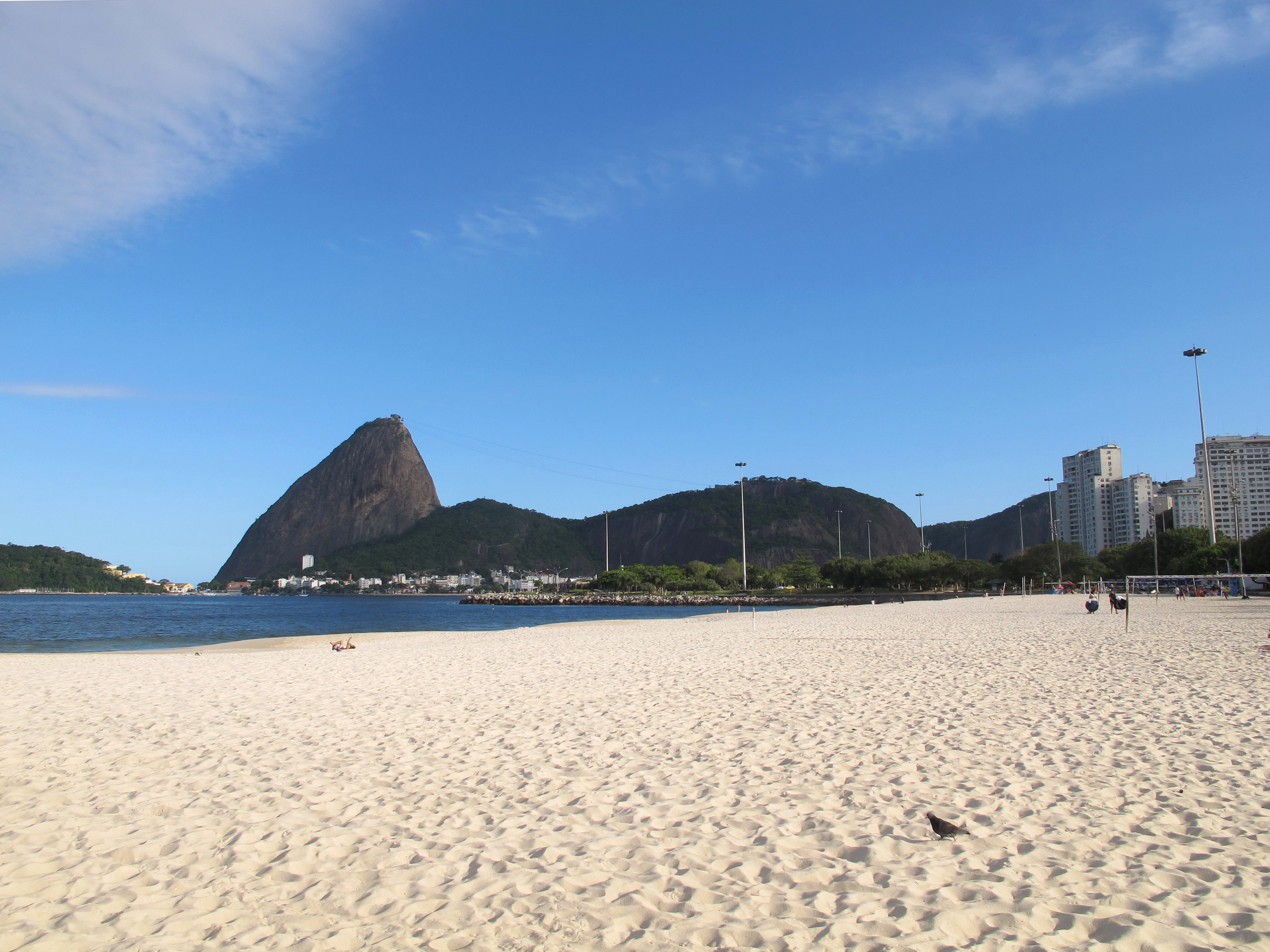
The final task of the season and the Finish Line were located on Flamengo Beach in Rio de Janeiro.

- Episode 10 (16 September 2016)
- Prize: A pair of trophies and a gnPearl pearl necklace worth CN¥1,000,000
- Winners: Guo Jingjing & Huo Qigang
- Runners-up: Liu Chang & Jin Dachuan
- Third place: Liu Xiang & Xu Qifeng

Locations

- Mexico City (Mexico City International Airport) → Rio de Janeiro, Brazil (Rio de Janeiro/Galeão International Airport)
- Rio de Janeiro (Windsor Atlantica Hotel)
- Rio de Janeiro (Copacabana Beach)
- Rio de Janeiro (Vidigal – Casa Alto Vidigal)
- Rio de Janeiro (Ipanema Beach)
- Rio de Janeiro (Urca – Praia Vermelha (in Portuguese))
- Rio de Janeiro (Escadaria Selarón)
- Rio de Janeiro (Flamengo Beach)

Episode summary

- During the Pit Stop, teams flew to Rio de Janeiro, Brazil, and began the final leg at the Windsor Atlantica Hotel. At the start of this leg, both team member had to drink a glass of fresh cherry juice on Copacabana Beach to reveal the number of a van with their next clue. After they were driven to Casa Alto Vidigal, teams had to prepare five churrasco skewers and then eat a plate of churrasco to receive their next clue. Teams then had play footvolley against a pair of local professionals on Ipanema beach. While the pros could not use their hands, teams could. Once teams scored eight points before the pros scored 21, they received their next clue, which directed them to Praia Vermelha.
- In this season's final Roadblock, one team member had to ride a wakeboard around a course in the water until they could reach and touch a yellow ramp without falling off to receive their next clue.
- After the Roadblock, teams were driven to Escadaria Selarón and had to search for one of three The Amazing Race China tiles. After giving the tile to a samba dancer, teams had to change into costume and learn simple samba steps. Teams then had to find 20 people to join them in a parade, with each person holding a coloured feather corresponding to their samba clothing, to the corner of R. Teotônio Regadas and Rua da Lapa streets to receive their next clue.
- Teams were driven to Flamengo Beach and had to map out their racecourse by looping a rope through a series of rings attached to a large map, with each ring representing a different city. Then, teams had to search among hundreds of bottles buried in the sand for the ten containing the flags of each country they visited and place them on the map to receive their final clue, which directed them to the nearby Finish Line. Teams could only bring back two bottles at a time and had to properly bury incorrect bottles back in the sand.

Cities	Flags
Beijing	China
Athens	Greece
Munich	Germany
Tokyo	Japan
Moscow	Russia
Barcelona	Spain
Rome	Italy
Los Angeles	United States
Atlanta	United States
Mexico City	Mexico
Rio de Janeiro	Brazil
