= Li Yitong =

Li Yitong may refer to:

- Li Yitong (singer) (born 1995), Chinese idol singer
- Li Yitong (actress) (born 1990), Chinese actress
