= Huang Tingting =

Chinese idol singer

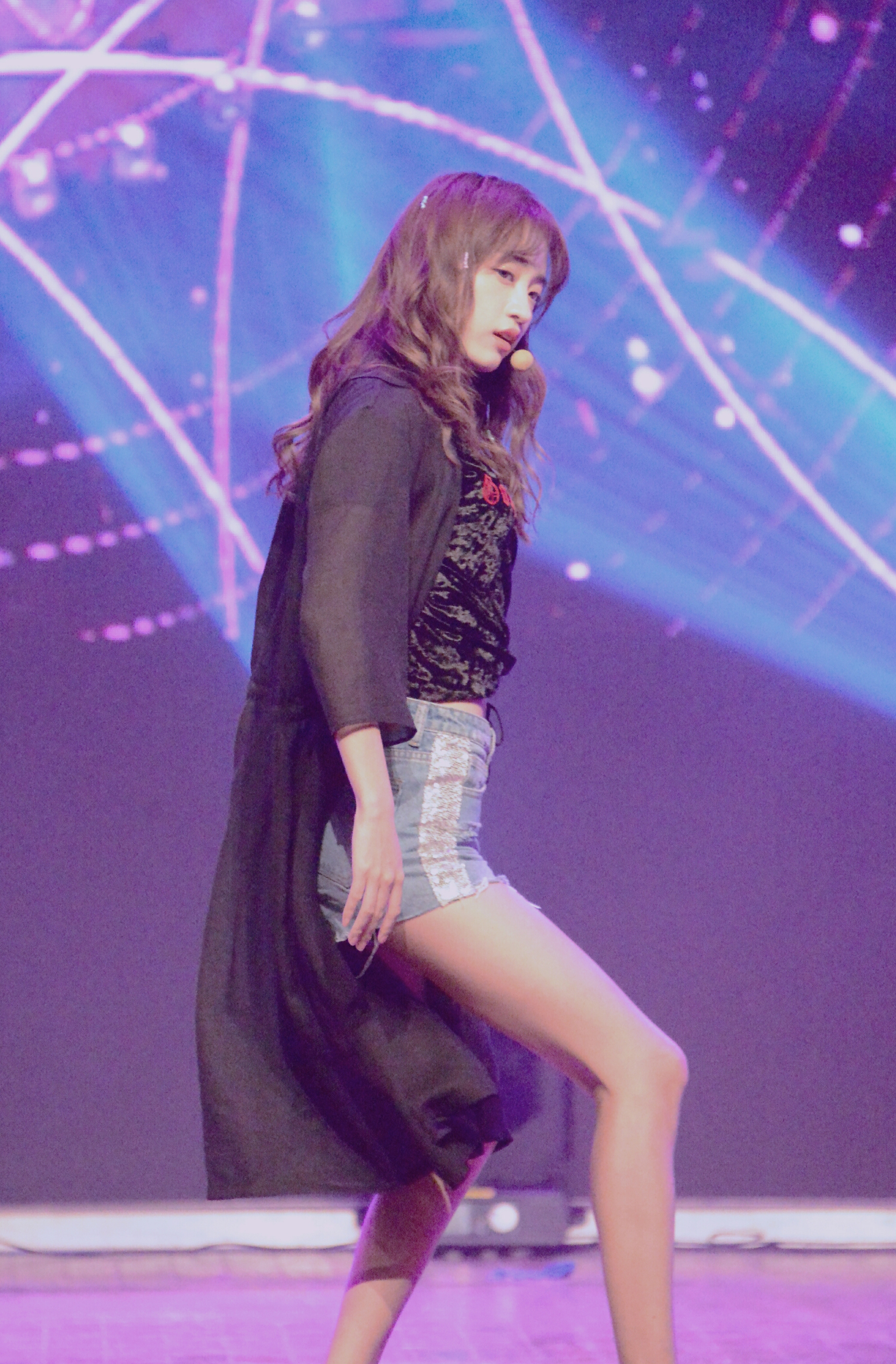
- Huang Tingting on May 25, 2018
- Born: September 8, 1992 (age 34); Nanjing, Jiangsu, China
- Occupations: Singer, actress
- Years active: 2013–2019

Chinese name
- Traditional Chinese: 黃婷婷
- Simplified Chinese: 黄婷婷
Transcriptions
Standard Mandarin
- Hanyu Pinyin: Huáng Tíngtíng
- Musical career
- Genres: Pop, Mandopop
- Instrument: Vocals
- Labels: Star48; Ninestyle Model Agency; Ninestyle Music

Huang Tingting (simplified Chinese: 黄婷婷; traditional Chinese: 黃婷婷; pinyin: Huáng Tíngtíng) is a Chinese singer and actress. She is known for being a former member of Chinese idol group SNH48, of which she served as vice-captain of Team NII from February 13, 2015, to December 22, 2017.

== Career ==
=== 2013 ===
On August 18, Huang was among the 34 shortlisted candidates for second-generation members of SNH48, and made her debut at Team NII's 1st Stage, "Theater no Megami" on 2 November. On 11 November, it was announced that Huang will be one of 24 members in Team NII during the team inauguration ceremony. On 16 November, she participated in SNH48's first major concert, "SNH48 Guangzhou Concert", held in the Guangzhou International Sports Arena.

On December 6, Huang accepted the "Most Potential Combination" award on behalf of SNH48 group at the 6th Top Chinese Music Chart Breakthrough New Artist Awards. Huang and other SNH48 members performed the debut single "Heavy Rotation " and the title track of the album "Fortune Cookie of Love" to open the awards ceremony. On December 31, Huang participated in Dragon TV's "New Year's Eve concert" themed "Dream of Oriental Life". The dancing movements were representative of the group making a "fireball", to signify passing love to everyone.

=== 2014 ===
On January 18, Huang participated in the first anniversary concert, a "Red and White PK Concert" for SNH48 in Shanghai. Huang was in Team NII, and the major PK competition was between Team SII and Team NII. The winner was determined by fan votes. On March 30, Huang represented SNH48 to accept the ERC Chinese Top Ten Best New Artist Award. On July 4, she participated in the original season of the variety show "SNHello Xingmeng Academy" which was planned and launched by SNH48. It was the first Chinese variety show exclusively for idol groups. On July 26, she participated the first General Election of SNH48, but not placing in the top 16.

=== 2015 ===
In January, Huang was appointed vice-captain of Team NII of 13 February and filmed her first music video, "Manatsu no Sounds Good!" at Saipan. On 25 July, she was ranked fourth in SNH48's second General Election, and on 26 December, she performed the song, "Oshibe to Meshibe to Yoru no Chouchou" with Li Yitong at the Request Hour Setlist Best 30 2015 Concert (2nd Edition), and came in first. As an award, she was given the chance to release her first solo single, "Youth Flash".

=== 2016 ===
On February 27, Huang received more than 460,000 votes on live show of "National Pretty Girl". During the voting period, several servers were paralyzed due to so many voters trying to vote at the same time. This still holds the record for the highest votes in this live show's history. On March 18, her music video "Night Butterfly" debuted. Huang was allowed to film this music video as her reward for General Music Election BEST30. This music video was filmed in South Korea. On April 1, Huang got her first center in the music video "Engine of Youth"; this is also the SNH48's first original single. On May 3, Huang's first solo music video, "Youth Flash" was officially released. On May 20, "Dream Land" was released. It is a group EP, which was filmed in Mauritius, Africa and combines many African musical elements. On 8 July 2016, Huang joined the first episode of The Amazing Race China 3, which was Chinese reality television series about sport race, and Huang was paired with groupmate Sun Rui as cast members. On 30 July, during SNH48's third General Election, Huang was ranked third with 130,258.3 votes. On November 25, she participated in the variety show "Let's go! idol" ("抱走吧！爱豆").

=== 2017 ===
On February 26, Huang was a guest on the talk show Roast! She served as the "Talk King" or host for the episode. On May 10, Huang participated the celebrity cooking competition reality show "Xian Chu Dang Dao" ("鲜厨当道”). On June 9, Huang played a role in drama "Stairway to Stardom". Huang's character is a popular actress named Chen Yurou. On June 26, she starred as a small princess in an ancient fantasy network drama called "Cover The Sky". On July, during SNH48's fourth General Election, Huang came in third with 165193.8 votes. On December 22, Huang resigned from her position as vice-captain of Team NII in light of an internal conflict within the team involving member Li Yitong.

=== 2018 ===
On April 7, She participated in the first SNH48 Idol Sport Games. On May 4, Huang performed the song "The Best Stage" to express the concept of creation and dreaming the future. In July, during SNH48's fifth General Election, Huang came in second.

=== 2019 ===
On May 10, Huang participated the third original public performance of SNH48 team NII, "The Scroll of Time" ("时之卷").

=== Conflict with Star48 ===
On December 20, 2019, Huang Tingting announced on her secondary Weibo account that she had terminated her contract with Star48 Media, but the post was later deleted for unknown reasons. The next day, SNH48 officially listed Huang as an inactive member. In January 2021, Star48 Media received a court ruling ordering the continuation of the contract, but since the contract could no longer be enforced, it was legally nullified.

In September 2022, due to contractual disputes, Huang and another SNH48 member, Feng Xinduo, filed an appeal against Star48 Media. Previously, Huang had been ordered to continue fulfilling her contract with Star48 Media. In November of the same year, the first-instance legal documents concerning the contractual dispute between Huang and Star48 Media were made public. According to the documents, Star48 Media claimed that Huang not only refused to participate in the performances arranged by the company but also independently engaged in activities with third parties. They requested the court to terminate the contract and demanded 10 million RMB in damages from Huang. The court found the 10 million RMB penalty to be excessive and adjusted it accordingly. Ultimately, the court ruled to terminate the contract and ordered Huang to pay 3.5 million RMB in damages to Star48 Media.

On February 28, 2023, Star48 Media issued an announcement stating that Huang Tingting had the ability to comply with the legal ruling but refused to fulfill her obligations. Consequently, the Shanghai Hongkou District People's Court included her in the list of judgment defaulters. Huang expressed her respect for the judicial decision and stated that she would resolve her financial issues promptly. According to the enforcement ruling for the contract dispute between Star48 Media and Huang, the court determined that Huang should pay approximately 3.5 million RMB in damages and report her assets. However, she neither complied with the ruling nor reported her assets. Therefore, the court froze her bank accounts, including deposits of over 66,000 RMB and online funds of over 24,000 RMB, totaling 90,000 RMB.

On June 29, 2023, Huang posted on Weibo that, with the help of her friends and family, she had paid the full amount ordered by the court and received a notice of case closure, signifying the official termination of her contract with Star48 Media. Previously, the Qichacha app showed that the enforcement and dishonesty cases against Huang had been marked as invalid.

=== Solo activities ===
Huang made her official acting debut in the horror short film Souvenirs. She made her small-screen debut in romance drama Stairway to Stardom (2017), playing a supporting role as a top celebrity. The following year, she was cast in her first lead role in fantasy drama Cover The Sky (2018). Huang was also cast in the romance comedy drama Cyrano Agency, and campus music drama So Young.

== Discography ==
Year	English title	Chinese title	Album	Notes
2016	"Youth Flash"	青春闪电	—N/a	

== Filmography ==
=== Film ===
Year	English title	Chinese title	Role	Notes
2016	Souvenirs	纪念品	Tingting	Short film
2019	Miss Forever	一生有你	Leilei	
2020	Fox Fairy Teases Childe	翠狐戏夫	Xiaocui	

=== Television series ===
Year	English title	Chinese title	Role	Notes
2014	Super! Soccer	球爱酒吧	University student	Cameo
2017	Stairway to Stardom	逆袭之星途璀璨	Cheng Yurou	
2018	Cover The Sky	素手遮天	Su Jin	
2023	To Ship Someone	全世界都在等你们分手	Lin Qingmiao/Xu Tiantian	Guest
2024	Heart of Ice and Flame	王妃芳龄三千岁	Mo Bing	
2024	Pegasus	飞驰人生热爱篇	Jieshuo Xiao Huang	
TBA	Cyrano Agency	大鼻子情圣	Sun Yiran	
TBA	So Young	小夜曲	Wei Lan	

=== Variety show ===
Year	English title	Chinese title	Role	Notes
12/15/2013	China's Got Talent	中国达人秀	Guest	
2016	The Amazing Race China 3	极速前进第三季	Cast member	with Sun Rui
09/10/2016	Happy Camp	快乐大本营	Guest	
02/26/2017	Roast!	吐槽大会	Guest	won the Talk King
6/10/2018	Day Day Up	天天向上	Guest	
6/24/2019	Lin Jia Shi Hua	邻家诗话	Guest	talk about the Chinese culture of poetry, song, music, dance, book, painting, tea

== SNH48activities ==
=== EPs ===
Year	No.	Title	Role	Notes
2013	3	Fortune Cookie of Love	B-side	Debut with SNH48 Team NII
2014	4	Heart Electric	B-side	
2014	5	UZA	B-side	
2015	6	Give Me Five!	B-side	
2015	7	After Rain	B-side	
2015	8	Manatsu no Sounds Good!	A-side	
2015	9	Halloween Night	A-side	Ranked 4th in the 2nd General election
2015	10	New Year’s Bell	A-side	
2016	11	Engine of Youth	A-side	First original EP; Center
2016	12	Dream Land	A-side	Second original EP
2016	13	Princess's Cloak	A-side	
2016	14	Happy Wonder World	B-side	Center
2017	15	Each Other's Future	A-side	
2017	16	Summer Pirates	A-side	Center; Also sang on "Limited season" as part of Team NII
2017	17	Dawn in Naples	A-side	
2017	18	Sweet Festival	B-side	Sang on "Good Luck" with SNH48, center

=== Albums ===
- Mae Shika Mukanee (2014)

=== Units ===
==== SNH48 Stage Units ====
Stage No.	Song	Notes
Team NII 1st Stage "Theater no Megami"	Locker Room Boy 更衣室男孩	With Wang Yijun/Dong Yanyun/Li Yitong, Luo Lan, Xu Yanyu and Zeng Yanfen
Team NII 2nd Stage "Saka Agari"	Ai no Iro 爱的颜色	With He Xiaoyu, Lin Siyi, Tang Anqi, Yi Jia'ai and Zeng Yanfen
Team NII 3rd Stage "Mokugekisha"	Saboten to Gold Rush 仙人掌与淘金热	With Lin Siyi, He Xiaoyu, Gong Shiqi, Tang Anqi and Dong Yanyun
Team NII 4th Stage "Boku no Taiyou"	Boku to Juliet to Jet Coaster 朱丽叶	With Zhao Yue and Dong Yanyun
Team NII 5th Stage "Exclusive Party"	Don't touch	With Wan Lina and He Xiaoyu

==== Concert units ====
Year	Date	Name	Song	Notes
2013	16 November	Guangzhou Concert	None	
2014	18 January	Kouhaku Utagassen 2014	None	
2014	26 July	SNH48 Sousenkyo Concert in Shanghai	None	
2015	31 January	Request Hour Setlist Best 30 2015	Saboten to Gold Rush 仙人掌与淘金热; Hatsukoi yo, Konnichiwa 初恋你好; Oshibe to Meshibe to Yoru no Chouchou 夜蝶	With Lin Siyi, He Xiaoyu, Gong Shiqi, Tang Anqi and Dong Yanyun; With Wan Lina and Gong Shiqi; With Li Yitong
2015	25 July	2nd General Election Concert	None	
2015	26 December	Request Hour Setlist Best 30 2015 (2nd Edition)	Enjou Rousen 燃烧的道路; Dakishimeraretara 如果你拥抱我; Oshibe to Meshibe to Yoru no Chouchou 夜蝶	With Zhao Yue; With Dai Meng and Qiu Xinyi; With Li Yitong
2016	30 July	3rd General Election Concert	Higurashi no Koi 暮蝉之恋	With Dai Meng
2017	7 January	Request Hour Setlist Best 50 (3rd Edition)	Pajama Drive 不眠之夜; Seishun no Inatzuma 青春闪电; Temodemo no Namida 爱恨的泪	With Liu Zengyan and Ma Yuling; Solo song With Li Yitong
2017	29 July	4th General Election Concert	Dark Princess 黑夜女神	Solo song
