= Camp de Tir Olímpic de Mollet =

Firing range in Mollet del Vallès, Spain

Coordinates: 41°33′2.67″N 2°13′8.59″E

The Camp de Tir Olímpic de Mollet is a firing range located in Mollet del Vallès, Catalonia, Spain. Constructed between June 1990 and April 1992 and located near the Academy of the Police of Catalonia, it hosted the shooting events and the shooting part of the modern pentathlon competitions for the 1992 Summer Olympics.

The competition area covered 342,000 m^{2} (3,680,000 sq ft).
