= Maidreamin =

Maid café restaurant chain in Japan

- Type: Private
- Industry: Foods and entertainment
- Founded: April 25, 2008; 18 years ago in Tokyo, Japan
- Headquarters: Akihabara, Tokyo, Japan
- Area served: Japan, Thailand
- Services: Restaurant, music
- Number of employees: 500 (2019)
- Parent: Neodelight International, Inc.
- Website: maidreamin.com

Maidreamin (stylized as maidreamin) is one of the largest maid café restaurant chains in Japan, owned by Neodelight International, Inc. The restaurant chain employs over 500 maids at 18 restaurants in Japan and Thailand.

== History ==
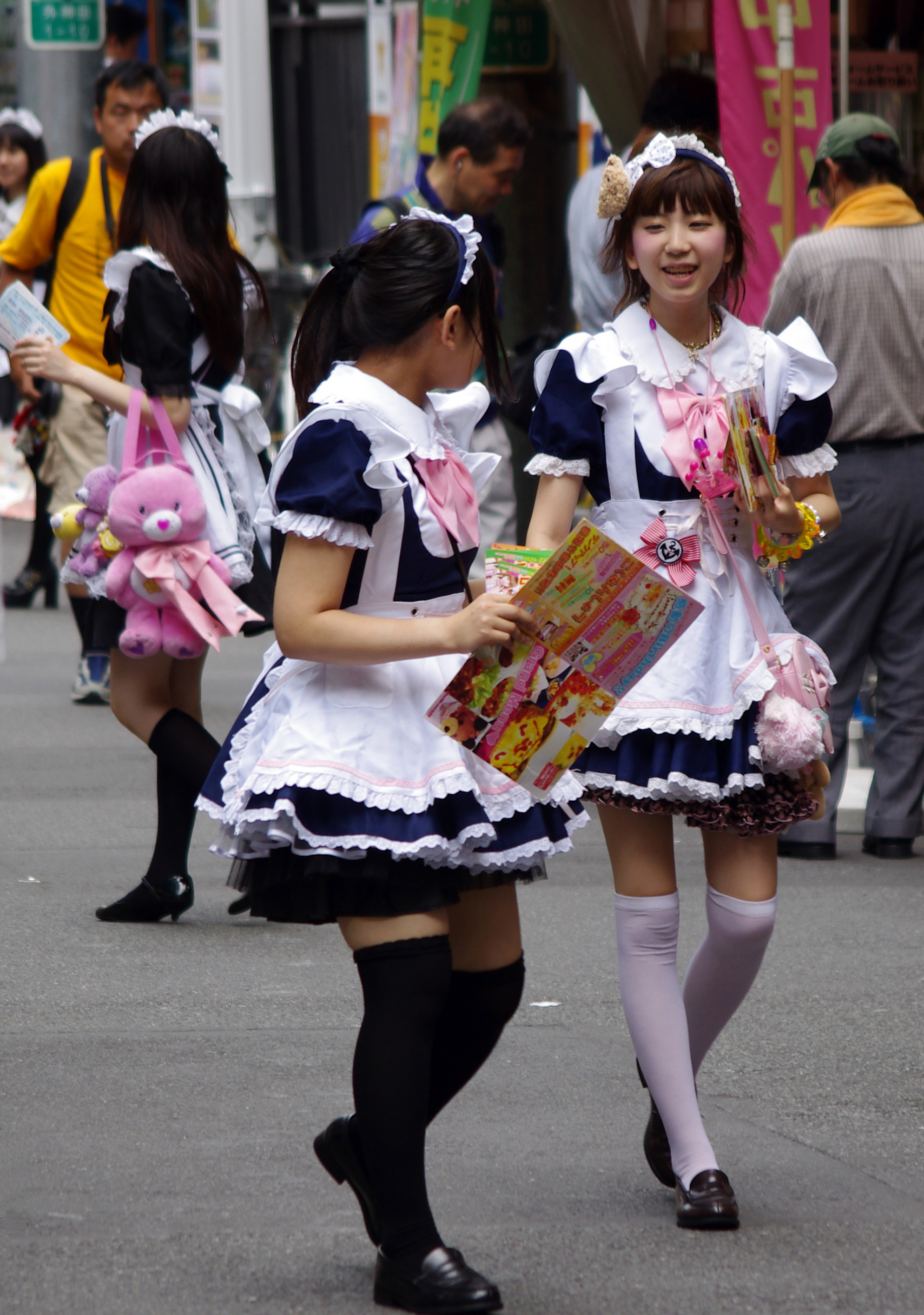
Maidreamin maids handing distributing flyers in Akihabara

Maidreamin's first location, the Akihabara Headquarter Store was opened on April 25, 2008. They opened their first restaurant outside Japan in Bangkok in 2013. Their latest store launched in Fukuoka in 2016.

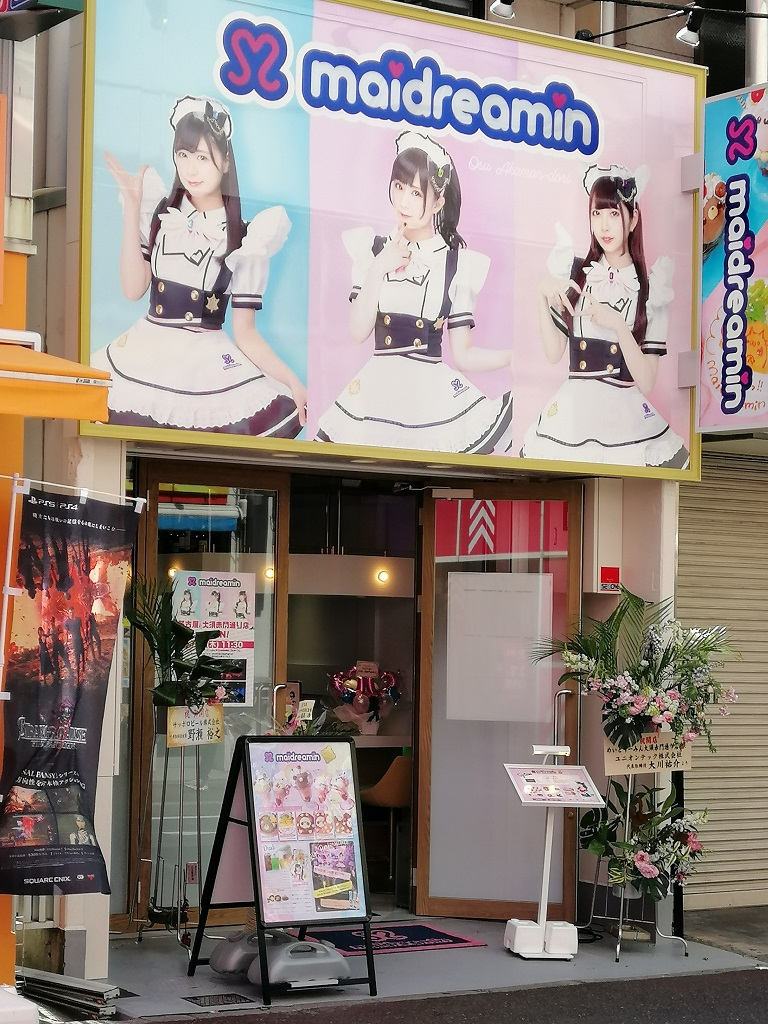
Exterior of maidreamin maid cafe

In 2017, Maidreamin received the TripAdvisor Certificate of Excellence for 5 of its stores.

== Style ==
Maidreamin's all-female staff wears identical bright white, pink, and blue maid uniforms and the restaurants serve kawaii-themed meals and drinks. The staff members perform a short ceremony at each table when serving their customers, and delivers a musical performance on the restaurant's stage every two hours.

The interior of each restaurant has a different design, and photos of the maids inside the restaurants are prohibited unless purchased as part of a promotional package. Customers are encouraged to wear animal-themed headbands provided by the staff (ex: bunny ears, cat ears) during their meal.

== Collaborations ==
Maidreamin collaborated on promotions for video games Dx2 Shin Megami Tensei: Liberation, Goddess Masters, Kurokishi to Shiro no Maou, Shibuya design firm Team Labo, and cookware designer Joshi Spa.

== Musical unit ==
Maidreamin's musical performance unit is known as "Quality Service Cleanliness Smile (QSCS)". The group performs regularly at Maidreamin's stores in Japan. They have appeared internationally at several Japanese anime and pop culture events, including Anime Expo, Ani:Me Abu Dhabi, Middle East Film and Comic Con Dubai, and Otakuthon Canada.

In July 2017, maidreamin released their first music CD, Maid in Tokyo. A second CD single, Shining days -Mata Au Himade-, was released in 2019.

== International expansion ==
In 2012, an expansion to the United States was announced but not completed.
