= Li Yitong (singer) =

Chinese idol singer (born 1995)

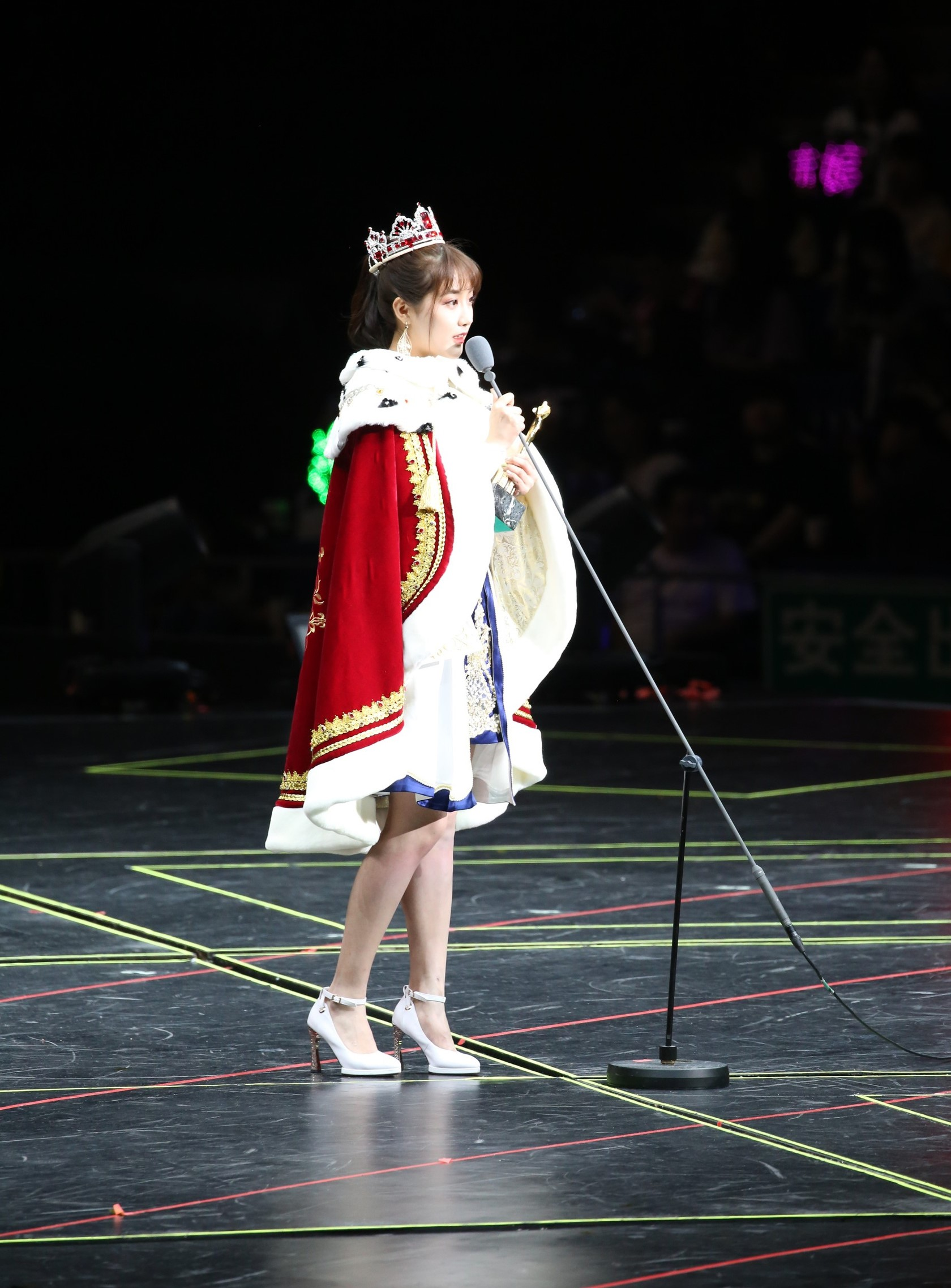
- Born: December 23, 1995 (age 30); Xi'an, Shaanxi, China
- Occupations: Singer, actress
- Years active: 2013-present

Chinese name
- Traditional Chinese: 李藝彤
- Simplified Chinese: 李艺彤
Transcriptions
Standard Mandarin
- Hanyu Pinyin: Lǐ Yìtóng
- Musical career
- Genres: Pop, Mandopop
- Instrument: Vocals
- Labels: Star48; Ninestyle Model Agency; Ninestyle Music

Li Yitong (simplified Chinese: 李艺彤; traditional Chinese: 李藝彤; pinyin: Lǐ Yìtóng; born December 23, 1995, in Xi'an, Shaanxi, China) is a Chinese idol singer and actress. She was a member of Team HII of female idol group SNH48.

== Early life ==
Li had developed an interest in manga and Touhou Project game series since her high school days, and during ninth grade, she developed an interest in cosplay. Prior to joining SNH48, she had also been a huge fan of AKB48, and regards Yuki Kashiwagi as her favorite member.

== Career ==
Li took part in the auditions for second-generation members in mid-2013 before becoming one of the official second-generation members on August 18. With the creation of teams on 11 November, she became one of the 24 members of Team NII. On 2 November, Li missed the "Theater no Megami" stage as she had no prior dancing skills. On 16 November, she participated in SNH48's first major concert, "SNH48 Guangzhou Concert", held in the Guangzhou International Sports Arena.

In 2014, after not performing during public performances, Li decided to write more posts on Sina Weibo, allowing her fans to know her better. On March 19, she wrote a long Weibo post, which caused her to rise in popularity, and she eventually ranked sixth in the first General Election on July 26. On August 19, she started university at Shanghai International Studies University. On 12 October, the release of SNH48's EP "UZA" saw Li as part of the Senbatsu, and her first music video appearance, which was shot in South Korea in June. She was involved in writing the script for the 14th episode of SNHello, broadcast on Youku, which received over a million views.

On 31 January 2015, on SNH48 Request Hour Setlist Best 30 2015, Li Yitong performed "Oshibe to Meshibe to Yoru no Chouchou" with Huang Tingting, which ranked fourth, while her performance of "Enjou Rousen" with Feng Xinduo was ranked 10th. On 25 July, Li was ranked third in SNH48's second General Election, receiving 47,134.5 votes, subsequently becoming part of Seine River together with Zhao Jiamin and Ju Jingyi. In October 2015, she was part of Shandong Television's reality program A Song for You, becoming the first SNH48 member to star in such a program. From 11 December onwards, she became one of the hosts for Informal Talks. On 26 December, her performances of "Oshibe to Meshibe to Yoru no Chouchou" and "Ame no Pianist" on SNH48's second Request Time were ranked first and fourth respectively.

On June 27, 2016, Li starred in Studio48 drama Campus Beauty. On July 23, she starred in Hunan Television's variety show, Summer Sweetie. On July 30, during SNH48's third General Election, Li was ranked second with 169,971.4 votes.

On January 7, 2017, she participated in SNH48's third Request Time, of which her song "Temodemo no Namida", performed with Huang Tingting, came in second. On June 9, she starred in web drama Stairway to Stardom. On July 29, during SNH48's fourth General Election, Li came in second with 259478.6 votes. During the I Top Fan Festival on November 19, Li won the "Most Popular Female Artist" award. During the Tencent Star Awards 2017 held on December 3, she won the "New Female Artist of the Year" award.

On January 11, 2018, during the NetEase Attitude Awards 2017, Li won the "Most Popular New Artist of the Year" award. On February 3, during SNH48's fourth Request Time, Li was transferred to Team HII as part of the SNH48 Team Shuffle. On July 28, 2018, with 402,040.40 votes from the public, she ranked #1 overall during the 5th General Election held by SNH48 (Senbatsu Election), thus becoming the new Top Girls Center for the coming year.

On July 27, 2019, Li came in first again during SNH48 Group's sixth General Election. On September 13, she became the second SNH48 member after Ju Jingyi to be elevated to the Star Palace for coming in first for two consecutive years. As such, an individual studio and website were set up to manage her solo activities.

== Discography ==
=== With SNH48 ===
==== EPs ====
| Year | No. | Title | Role | Notes |
|---|---|---|---|---|
| 2014 | 5 | UZA | A-side | |
| 2015 | 6 | Give Me Five! | B-side | |
| 2015 | 7 | After Rain | A-side | |
| 2015 | 8 | Manatsu no Sounds Good! | A-side | |
| 2015 | 9 | Halloween Night | A-side | Ranked 3rd in the 2nd General Election |
| 2015 | 10 | New Year's Bell | A-side | |
| 2016 | 11 | Engine of Youth | A-side | First original EP |
| 2016 | 12 | Dream Land | B-side | Second original EP |
| 2016 | 13 | Princess's Cloak | A-side | Ranked 2nd in the 3rd General Election |
| 2016 | 14 | Happy Wonder World | B-side | |
| 2017 | 15 | Each Other's Future | A-side | Center |
| 2017 | 16 | Summer Pirates | B-side | Sang on "Limited season" as part of Team NII |
| 2017 | 17 | Dawn in Naples | A-side | Ranked 2nd in the 4th General Election |
| 2017 | 18 | Sweet Festival | A-side | Center |
| 2018 | 20 | Forest Theorem | A-side | Center |
| 2018 | 21 | Endless Story | A-side | Center; Ranked 1st in the 5th General election |
| 2018 | 22 | Now and Forever | A-side | Center; Also sang on "Say Happy New Year", center |

==== Albums ====
- Mae Shika Mukanee (2014)

=== With Seine River ===
- Sweet & Bitter (2015)

== Units ==
=== SNH48 Stage Units ===
| Stage No. | Song | Notes |
|---|---|---|
| Team NII 1st Stage "Theater no Megami" | Romance Kakurenbo 恋爱捉迷藏 | |
| Team NII 1st Stage "Theater no Megami" | Locker Room Boy 更衣室男孩 | Stand-in |
| Team NII 2nd Stage "Saka Agari" | Wagamama na Nagareboshi 任性的流星 | Stand-in for Luo Lan or Ju Jingyi |
| Team NII 3rd Stage "Mokugekisha" | Ude wo Kunde 握你的手 | With Meng Yue and Yi Jia'ai |
| Team NII 4th Stage "Boku no Taiyou" | Higurashi no Koi 暮蝉之恋 | With Yi Jia'ai |
| Team NII 5th Stage "Exclusive Party" | Puppet 木偶 | Solo song |
| Team NII 6th Stage "In the Name of Love" | Four Seasons 春夏秋冬 | With Jiang Zhenyi, Wan Lina and Huang Tongyang |

=== Concert units ===
| Year | Date | Name | Song | Notes |
|---|---|---|---|---|
| 2013 | 16 November | Guangzhou Concert | None | |
| 2014 | 18 January | Red and White Concert | None | |
| 2014 | 26 July | SNH48 Sousenkyo Concert in Shanghai | None | |
| 2015 | 31 January | Request Hour Setlist Best 30 2015 | Oshibe to Meshibe to Yoru no Chouchou 夜蝶 | With Huang Tingting |
| 2015 | 25 July | 2nd General Election Concert | Blue Rose | With Wu Zhehan, Chen Guanhui and Li Yuqi |
| 2015 | 26 December | Request Hour Setlist Best 30 2015 (2nd Edition) | Ame no Pianist 雨中钢琴师; Oshibe to Meshibe to Yoru no Chouchou 夜蝶 | With Xu Zixuan and Liu Peixin; With Li Yitong |
| 2016 | 30 July | 3rd General Election Concert | New World 新世界 | With Li Yuqi and Mo Han |
| 2017 | 7 January | Request Hour Setlist Best 50 (3rd Edition) | You Are My Next Stop 下一站是你; Puppet 木偶; Temodemo no Namida 爱恨的泪 | With Feng Xinduo; Solo song With Huang Tingting |
| 2017 | 29 July | 4th General Election Concert | Can't Switch Off 关不掉 | Solo song |

== Filmography ==
=== Dramas ===
| Year | English title | Chinese title | Role | Notes |
|---|---|---|---|---|
| 2015 | Lonely Gourmet | 孤独的美食家 | | |
| 2016 | Campus Beauty | 贴身校花 | Qu Xue'er | |
| 2017 | Stairway to Stardom | 逆袭之星途璀璨 | Ye Qiao | |
| 2018 | Wan Neng Library | 万能图书馆 | Xiao Qing | Guest |
| 2018 | Cinderella Chef | 萌妻食神 | Ah Ruan | |
| 2018 | Take My Brother Away | 快把我哥带走 | Fang Jie | |
| 2019 | Chasing Ball | 追球 | Tong Jiayue | |
| 2020 | Candle in the Tomb | 鬼吹灯 | | |
| 2020 | Mei Ren Mu Bai Shou | 美人暮白首 | Rong Su | |
| 2020 | Charming and Countries | 十国千娇 | Fu Jinsheng | |
| 2020 | Legend of two Sisters in the Chaos | 浮世双娇传 | Fu Jinzhan | main |

=== Variety shows ===
| Year | Date | Channel | Title | Notes |
|---|---|---|---|---|
| 2014 | 17 June | Tudou, Youku | SNH48玩转世界杯 | Co-host with Meng Yue |
| 2014 | September | TV Asahi Online | Shang High School 48 上海学院48 | Ep 23 |
| 2014 | 9 September, 25 September | Tudou, Youku | SNHello | Ep 9, 12 |
| 2015 | 14 January | Hunan Television | I Am A Great Beauty 我是大美人 | With Ju Jingyi, Qiu Xinyi, Mo Han, Wu Zhehan and Dai Meng |
| 2015 | 23 January | Mango TV | Mini美人 | With Lu Ting |
| 2015 | 1 February | TV Asahi Online | Shang High School 48 上海学院48 | |
| 2015 | 20 May | Kugou Fanxing | Kugou Star 酷狗星乐坊 | With Mo Han, Kong Xiaoyin, Ju Jingyi and Gong Shiqi |
| 2015 | 9–11 July | AcFun | Weekly News Girl SNH48 周刊少女SNH48 | With Mo Han, Feng Xinduo and Yang Huiting (Ep 1); With Feng Xinduo, Huang Tingting and Yi Jia'ai |
| 2015 | 10 July | Toonmax Television | 学长驾到 | With Yi Jia'ai, Dong Yanyun, Feng Xinduo, Zhang Yuxin and Zhao Yue |
| 2015 | 13 July | KanKan News | 语录 | With Feng Xinduo, Yi Jia'ai and Zeng Yanfen |
| 2015 | 27 July | QQLive | Running Mei 进击的女生 | |
| 2015 | 16 August | Hunan Television | People (In) News 新闻当事人 | |
| 2015 | 22 August | Dragon Television | Entertainment Online 新娱乐在线 | With Ju Jingyi, Zhao Jiamin, Zhang Yuge, Liu Jiongran and Xu Han |
| 2015 | 25 October- | iQiyi, iQilu, PPTV | A Song for You 为你而歌 | |
| 2015 | 11 December- | Hubei Television | Informal Talks 非正式会谈 | |
| 2016 | 8 January | Jiangsu Television | The Brain 最强大脑 | |
| 2016 | 17 January | Jiangsu Television | Little Cook Star 加油小当家 | With Ju Jingyi and Huang Tingting |
| 2016 | 17 January | Hunan Television | Mom Loves U 妈妈的牵挂 | |
| 2016 | 6 March-15 May | Zhejiang Television | Hidden Singer 谁是大歌神 | With Zeng Yanfen and Sun Rui |
| 2016 | 23 July | Hunan Television | Summer Sweetie 夏日甜心 | |
| 2016 | 10 September | Hunan Television | Happy Camp 快乐大本营 | With Top 16 |
| 2017 | 18 May | Hunan Television | The Beauty of Chinese Civilization 中华文明之美 | With Fei Qinyuan and Sun Zhenni |
| 2017 | 23 May | Xing Kong, Toonmax | WA 我爱二次元 | |
