= List of Hunan Television dramas in 2012 =

This is a list of television serial dramas broadcast by HBS's Hunan Television in 2012.

== Golden Eagle Theater ==
- 6 January – 1 July: air from 22:00 to 24:00, nightly (2 episodes per day).
- 1 July – present: Sunday to Thursday 19:30 to 22:00 (2 episodes per day), Friday to Saturday 19:30–20:10 (1 episode per day).

Premiere	English title (Chinese title)	Eps.	Cast and crew	Theme song(s)	Avg. rating	Genre
6 January	Another Brilliant Life 另一种灿烂生活	30	Park Hae-jin, Jiang Kaitong, Qiao Qiao, Han Chengyu, Shin Min-hee	"Another Brilliant Life" (Duan Linxi)	1.10	Romance
20 January	Palace: The Locked Beaded Curtain 宫锁珠帘	35	Du Chun, Mickey He, Yuan Shanshan, Shu Chang, Jenny Zhang, Yang Rong, Sun Feifei	"Ai De Gongyang" (Du Chun, Mickey He)	3.06	Historical fiction
9 February	Mystery in the Palace 深宫谍影	37	Gan Tingting, Kevin Cheng, Michelle Yim, Liu Ting Yu, Zhang Danfeng, Catherine Hung	"Hanxiang" (Liu Tingyu)	2.02	Suspense
25 February	Come Home 亲爱的，回家	36	Han Xue, Jiang Yi, Yu Na, Hu Bing, Kingdom Yuen		1.58	Romance
13 March	Pianpian An Shang Ni 偏偏爱上你	28	Han Xue, Yu Xiaowei, Allen Ting, Gao Shuguang	"Kexi Bushi Ni" (Han Xue)	1.07	Romance
27 March	Secret History of Princess Taiping 太平公主秘史	45	Alyssa Chia, Zheng Shuang, Lin Miaoke, Zhang Han, Lan Yan, Li Xiang, Liu Yuxin, Yuan Hong	"Guren Tan" (Zhang Jieqian)	0.82	Historical fiction
14 April	Queen of Reversals 逆转女王	31	Kim Nam-joo, Jung Joon-ho, Park Si-hoo, Chae Jung-an		0.36	romance
23 April	Battle of the Beauty 笑红颜	26	Hu Jing, Baron Chen, Damian Lau, Dai Chun Rong, Yvonne Yung, Bai Shan, Yue Yue	"Shuiyue" (Hu Jing)	0.73	Period
8 May	Shang Jin Lieren 赏金猎人	30	Qian Yong Chen, Jiang Kaitong, Ying Er, Li Yifeng	"Jianghu" (Li Yifeng)	0.56	period
22 May	My Sassy Girl 牵牛的夏天	30	Eddie Peng, Lemon Zhang, Zhang Junning	"Ouran" (Anthony Wen)	0.47	romance, comedy
2 June	Baobei Mama Baobei Nü 宝贝妈妈宝贝女	36	Chang Chen-kuang, Ma Tianyu, Sun Xiaoxiao, Lu Chen, Yin Yezi, Lei Nuoer, Nathan Lee	"Shuo Bu Qing" (Sun Xiaoxiao)	0.91	romance
16 June	In Time with You 我可能不会爱你	24	Ariel Lin, Bolin Chen, Andrea Chen, Sunny Wang	"Haishi Hui" (William Wei)	1.01	romance
24 June	The Magic Blade 天涯明月刀	40	Wallace Chung, Zhang Meng, Baron Chen, David Chiang, Zhang Dinghan, Rachel Mao	"The Magic Blade" (Wallace Chung)	2.21	wuxia
15 July	The Queen of SOP 胜女的代价	30	Joe Chen, Godfrey Gao, Zhang Han, Zhang Meng, Jiang Yi	"Xihuan Gudu" (Chen Qiaoen)	1.89	romance
30 July	The Legend of Zhong Kui 钟馗传说	40	Bobby Au-yeung, Lou Yujian, Yang Dapeng, Pan Changjiang		1.05	historical faction
13 August	Love Actually 爱的蜜方	35	Lee Da-hae, Joe Cheng, Li Yifeng, Fang Anna, Liu Yue		1.16	romance
27 August	Fairytale 童话二分之一	30	Janine Chang, Lee Joon-hyuk, Zhu Zixiao, Liu Meihan	"Ai, You Ni Cai Wanzheng" (Vision Wei)	1.01	romance
11 September	Home, Sweet Home 我家有喜 & 非常有喜	58	Hai Lu, Li Jiahang, Fang Qingzhuo, Zhang Rui, Gao Ziqi	"Xingxing Yuelang Taiyang" (Li Cheng)	1.71	family, comedy
14 October	Refueling Mother & Happy Mother 加油妈妈 & 幸福妈妈	65	Mike He, Chang Yu-yen, Zong Fengyan, Zhang Xuan, Fang Xiaoyue, Mao Linlin		TBD	family
14 November	Hot Girl 麻辣女兵	38	Wang Yang, Hou Yong, Li Chen, Yang Shou, Ma Li, Wang Yu		TBD	military

== Golden Mango Theater ==
- Sunday to Thursday 19:30 to 22:00 (2 episodes per day), Friday to Saturday 19:30–20:10 (1 episode per day).

Premiere	English title (Chinese title)	Eps.	Cast and crew	Theme song(s)	Avg. rating	Genre
1 January	You Are My Love 你是我爱人	30	Zhang Guoli, Deng Jie, Chen Jianbin, Zhang Meng, Yong Mei		1.16	family
19 January	Wu Long Shan Jiao Fei Ji (part 1) 新乌龙山剿匪记	20	Choo Ja-hyun, Ady An, Purba Rgyal, Ray Lui, Shen Junyi		2.23	espionage
29 January	Ruyi 如意	42	Yang Mi, Hawick Lau, Zhu Yongteng, Liu Xuehua, Lü Jiarong	"Youdian Shebude" (Yang Mi)	2.55	period
23 February	Fuqi Naxie Shi 夫妻那些事	34	Huang Lei, Chen Shu, Liang Jing, Li Mingzhu, Wang Qing	"Jing Guo" (Chen Chusheng, He Jie)	1.42	family, comedy
14 March	Shouwang De Tiankong 守望的天空	30	Li Qin, Winston Chao, Lin Shen, Wang Lin, Li Yan		1.03	Family, human drama
2 April	AA Zhi Shenghuo; AA制生活	38	Li Xiaolu, Ma Su, Ren Zhong, Cao Bingkun, Liu Lili	"Buqi Buli" (Yu Quan)	0.86	romance
25 April	Xiao Fuqi Shidài 小夫妻时代	34	Zhu Yuchen, Ma Su, Pan Taiming, Sui Junbo	"Women De Wunai" (Shan Ye)	0.77	romance
15 May	Wu Long Shan Jiao Fei Ji (part 2) 新乌龙山剿匪记	26	Choo Ja-hyun, Ady An, Purba Rgyal, Ray Lui, Shen Junyi	"Jing Guo" (Chen Chusheng, He Jie)	2.23	espionage
4 June	Qing Ci 青瓷	40	Wang Zhiwen, Zhang Guoli, Han Yuqin, Wang Haiyan	"Chufei Shige Meng" (Sun Hao, Zhang Yao)	0.86	business, romance

== Weekly Prime Theater ==
- These dramas air from 22:00 to 24:00, Friday and Saturday (3 episodes per day).

Premiere	English title (Chinese title)	Eps.	Cast and crew	Theme song(s)	Avg. rating	Genre
6 July	Xuan-Yuan Sword: Scar of Sky 轩辕剑:天之痕	35	Hu Ge, Cecilia Liu, Tiffany Tang, Jiang Jingfu, Guli Nuozha, Lin Gengxin, Ma Tianyu	"Yiwen Tianhuang" (Hu Ge)	2.26	fantasy
14 September	The Bride with White Hair 新白发魔女传	42	Nicky Wu, Ma Su, Louis Fan, Liu Sitong, Li Jie, Guo Zhenni	"Liuxiang" (Nicky Wu)	TBD	wuxia
3 November (Sat. only)	Drama Go! Go! Go! 姐姐立正向前走	30	Ruby Lin, Jiro Wang, Lin Gengxin, Maggie Wu, Hu Bing	"Wo Yinggai Qu Ai Ni" (Jiro Wang)	TBD	romance
4 November (Sun. only)	Amy Go 艾米加油	30	Sun Yaoqi, Li Jiahang, Bai huizi, Zhu Yongteng, Zang Hongna, Benjamin Schwartz		TBD	romance
