= The Amazing Race China =

Chinese adventure reality game show

- Chinese: 极速前进
- Hanyu Pinyin: Jísù Qiánjìn
- Genre: Reality competition
- Created by: Elise Doganieri; Bertram van Munster
- Based on: The Amazing Race by: Bertram van Munster; Elise Doganieri
- Presented by: Andy On (安志杰) (Season 1, Episodes 1–2); Allan Wu (吴振天) (Season 1, Episode 3 onwards)
- Theme music composer: John M. Keane (Season 3 onwards)
- Country of origin: China
- Original languages: Main: Mandarin; Supplementary: Cantonese, English, Korean
- No. of seasons: 4
- No. of episodes: 40

Production
- Executive producers: Zhu Ling (Seasons 1–2); Zhang Yi (Season 3)
- Editor: Jiang Ping (Season 3)
- Running time: 80–90 minutes
- Production companies: Shenzhen Media (Seasons 1, 3–4); Shine Entertainment (season 2)

Original release
- Network: Shenzhen TV, Sohu
- Release: October 17, 2014 – October 6, 2017

Related
- The Amazing Race

The Amazing Race China (Chinese: 极速前进; pinyin: Jísù Qiánjìn) (Previously known as The Amazing Race) is a Chinese reality competition show based on the American series The Amazing Race. Following the premise of other versions in the Amazing Race franchise, the show follows teams of two as they race across China and around the world. Each season is split into legs, with teams tasked to deduce clues, navigate themselves in foreign areas, interact with locals, perform physical and mental challenges, and travel by air, boat, car, taxi, and other modes of transport. Teams are progressively eliminated at the end of most legs for being the last to arrive at designated Pit Stops. The first team to arrive at the Finish Line wins two trophies and additional prizes from the show's sponsors.

This is the second version of The Amazing Race to be produced in China, following The Amazing Race: China Rush. This new version is broadcast on Shenzhen TV, and had its premiere on October 17, 2014.

The host for the show was originally Hong Kong-American actor Andy On. However, On only hosted 2 episodes of the first season and due to scheduling conflicts, did not return for later episodes. Singapore-based Chinese-American actor and host of The Amazing Race Asia and The Amazing Race: China Rush, Allan Wu, took over hosting duties for the remainder of the season and for future seasons.

All teams of this version are composed of at least one celebrity from China or Korea.

== The Race ==
The Amazing Race China is a reality television competition between teams of two celebrities in a race around the world. The season usually starts in China and is divided into 10 legs wherein teams travel and complete various tasks to obtain clues to help them progress to a Pit Stop where they are given a chance to rest and recover before starting the next leg. The first team to arrive at the Pit Stop is often awarded a prize, while the last team is normally eliminated (except in non-elimination legs, where the last team to arrive may be penalized in the following leg). The final leg is run by the last three remaining teams, and the first to arrive at the final destination wins two Trophies and the grand prize depending on season. The grand prize for Season 1 are 1,000,000 RMB plus two Infiniti Cars, Season 2 are 50,000 RMB for donation plus two Infiniti Cars, Season 3 were two pearl necklaces valued 1,000,000 RMB, and Season 4 was a one-year drink supply (which was also the standard prize for all the legs).

=== Teams ===
Each of teams are composed of two individuals who have some type of relationship to each other. One of the team member is a celebrity of China (Expect one team are son and daughter of a Chinese celebrity).

The participants mainly speaks Mandarin, but between the teams, teams will communicate either in Cantonese, English or Korean.

=== Route Markers ===
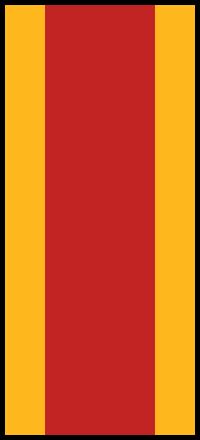

Route Markers are yellow and red flags that mark the places where teams must go. Most Route Markers are attached to the boxes that contain clue envelopes, but some may mark the place where the teams must go in order to complete tasks, or may be used to line a course that the teams must follow.

=== Clues ===
Clues are found throughout the legs in sealed envelopes, normally inside clue boxes. They give teams the information they need and tasks they need to do in order for them to progress. Clues are written in both Chinese and English.

- Route Info (信息): A general clue that may include a task to be completed by the team before they can receive their next clue.
- Detour (绕道): A choice of two tasks. Teams are free to choose either task or swap tasks if they find one option too difficult.
- Roadblock (路障): A task only one team member can complete. Teams must choose which member will complete the task based on a brief clue about the task before fully revealing the details of the task.
- Fast Forward (快进): A task that if completed allows a team to skip all remaining tasks in the leg and go directly to the Pit Stop. A team may only use the Fast Forward once. Appeared in seasons 1 and 3.

=== Obstacles ===
Teams may encounter the follow obstructions that could potentially slow them down:

- U-Turn (回转): A station located after a Detour where a team can force another trailing team to return and complete the other option of the Detour they did not select. The Double U-Turn which allows two teams to exercise their U-Turn power. There is also a vote U-Turn which having all teams voting at the start of the leg for whom they wish to receive the U-turn; The team with the most votes would be U-turned sometime during the leg. With the differences is on all season voted before the leg starts at the hotel, and during Seasons 1, 3 and 4, teams may discuss whom to vote before voting, whereas other versions could not.
- Yield (让路): A station where a team can force another trailing team to wait a pre-determined amount of time before continuing. The teams had to wait until the sand of hourglass was all gone, which took 15 minutes. It appears in Seasons 1 and 4.
- Intersection (联合): A sign indicating that two teams must complete further tasks together until a clue indicates that they have been unintersected.
- Versus / Face Off (对抗): An obstacle which has two teams compete against each other in a specific task. The winning team is given the next clue, while the losing team must wait out a 15-minute penalty before receiving the next clue. It was called Versus in Seasons 1 and 2, and later renamed to Face Off from Season 3.
- Invasion (踢馆): The intruders enter at the start of a given leg. In their invasion leg, the intruders must place in the top (ninth leg) or top two (seventh leg) to continue racing. If they fail their invasion, they may be eliminated. If they succeed, the last team to check-in may be eliminated, and the intruders will keep on racing in future legs. The invasion only appeared in Season 2.
- Intersection with Integration Versus (分组对抗积分赛段): Introduced in Season 2, it was a combination of both the Intersection and Versus/Face Off markers. All teams were intersected at the start of the leg, and both teams will travel to assigned locations simultaneously and perform a Versus/Face Off at each location, either by timing or head-to-head. After certain rounds, the team wins the most matches are automatically safe while the losing team must complete another Versus/Face Off; the losing team of the last Versus/Face Off will face elimination. Similar rules are adopted in Season 3 with different Intersection points on certain locations, instead of the entire leg. This twist was absent in Season 4.

=== Legs ===
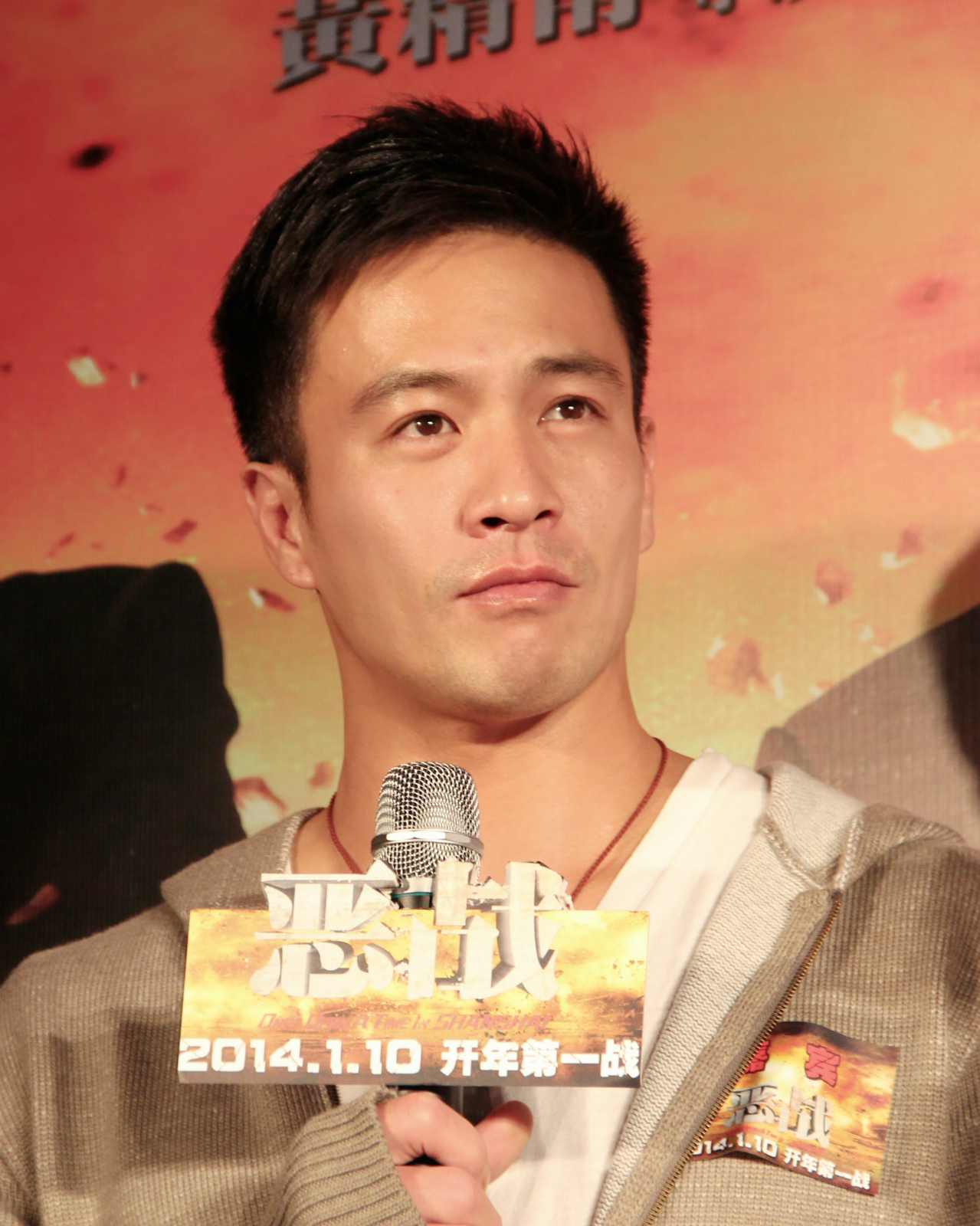
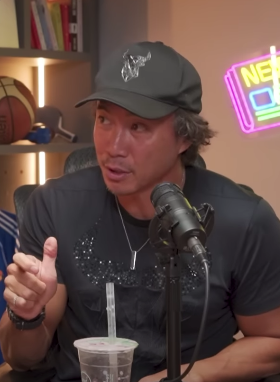
Hosts Andy On and Allan Wu

At the beginning of each leg, teams receive an allowance of cash, usually in local dollar which the team visit, to cover expenses during the legs.

Teams then have to follow clues and Route Markers that will lead them to the various destinations and tasks they will face. Modes of travel between these destinations include commercial and chartered airplanes, boats, trains, taxis, buses, and rented vehicles provided by the show, or the teams may simply travel by foot. Each leg ends with a Pit Stop (中继站) where teams are able to rest and where teams that arrive last are progressively eliminated until only three remain. The first teams to arrive at the Pit Stop win prizes, usually from the show's sponsors.

- The Express Pass (直通卡): It is awarded to the winners of the first legs, allows that team to skip any task they want. In Season 1, Jin Dachuan & Liu Chang won this pass, one for themselves and gave the second one to Zhang Tielin & Yueliang; Jin Dachuan & Liu Chang used their Express Pass to bypass their U-Turn by Zhong Hanliang & Jackie in Leg 3. Zhang Tielin & Yueliang used their Express Pass to bypass a Route Info task on the same leg. In Season 2, Yang Qianhua & Ding Zigao won this pass, one for themselves and gave the second one to Zeng Zhiwei & Zeng Baoyi; Yang Qianhua & Ding Zigao used their Express Pass to bypass the Detour in Leg 4. Zeng Zhiwei & Zeng Baoyi used their Express Pass to bypass a Route Info task in Leg 4. In Season 3, Liu Chang & Jin Dachuan won this pass again, one for themselves and gave the second one to Jin Xing & Heinz; Liu Chang & Jin Dachuan used their Express Pass to bypass the Detour in Leg 4. Jin Xing used their Express Pass to bypass a Roadblock in Leg 3.

Since Season 4, the Express Pass has been given out inside one of the clue randomly in Leg 1, allowing any team to win it rather than it being a definite award for a first-place finish on the leg. Fan Bingbing & Xie Yilin won this pass, one for themselves and gave the second one to Zheng Yuanchang & Wang Likun. Fan Bingbing & Xie Yilin used their Express Pass to bypass the leg's second Roadblock in Leg 2. Zheng Yuanchang & Wang Likun used their Express Pass to bypass the Face-off in Leg 4.

- The Save/The Return Ticket (復活卡): The Save is awarded to the winner of the eighth leg in Season 1. The team that won the pass must use it and make a team that was eliminated return at the ninth leg. Zhong Hanliang & Jackie won the pass and used it to allow Bai Jugang & Guan Xiaotong, who were eliminated in Leg 2, to return. It later returned on Season 3, having been renamed to The Return Ticket, and the effects were revised so that it must be used before Leg 4. The winner of the second leg, Zhang Zhehan & Zhang Sifan won the pass. They later used the pass at Leg 3 to save Jin Xing & Heinz who were eliminated on the same leg. The Save/Return Ticket were absent in seasons 2 and 4.

==== Non-elimination legs ====
Each season has a number of predetermined non-elimination legs, in which the last team to arrive at the Pit Stop is not eliminated and is allowed to continue.

- Speed Bump (减速带): A task that only the team saved from elimination on the previous leg must complete before continuing on.
- Rest Time Penalties: In some non-elimination legs of Season 2, teams receives penalties during team's rest period. In Leg 3, The last team must sleep in a store floor for resting one night. In Leg 7, the last-place team travels to the next destination by economic class while other teams are travelling in the business class.

==== Virtual Pit Stops ====
In the first season, a virtual pit stop is not counted as an actual pit stop where teams do not rest, beginning the next leg immediately without receiving the usual money or prizes (hence, virtual). Unlike the other versions where the last team were not given a non-elimination penalty and was told to continue racing, the last team was instead eliminated.

== Rules and penalties ==
Most of the rules and penalties are adopted directly from the American edition; but in some of cases, this version has been seen to have a unique set of additional rules.

=== Rules ===
- Unlike the American version, teams were not allowed to take notes during the race, this was specified on the preview episode of Season 2.
- The Pit Start is different from the American version, as teams depart either at the same time or in intervals between one and five minutes apart instead of departing at the time when teams arrived on the previous leg.
- In the event of a team coming last in a non-elimination leg while serving a penalty, their remaining penalty would not be carried forward to the next leg. In the American version, the penalty would be applied to the start of the next leg.

=== Penalties ===
- In Season 1 and Season 3, failing to complete any challenge (including Roadblocks and Detours) will result in a 1-hour penalty that will be assessed at the Pit Stop; partially-completed tasks will receive a 30-minute penalty.
- In Season 2, failing to complete any challenge (including Roadblocks and Detours) will result in a 1-hour penalty that must be served before teams were able to continue racing.
- From Season 4 onwards, failing to complete any challenge (including Roadblocks and Detours) will result in a 2-hour penalty that will be assessed at the Pit Stop.
- In Season 2, if the teams cannot finish the Face Off, they must wait until the last team served the 15-minute penalty before assessing another 15-minute penalty.

== Seasons ==
The show first aired in 2014 with the first-season premiere airing on October 17, 2014, and ending on December 19, 2014.

| Season | Broadcast | | Winners | Teams | Host |
| Season | Premiere date | Finale date | Winners | Teams | Host |
|---|---|---|---|---|---|
| 1 | October 17, 2014 | December 19, 2014 | Zhong Hanliang & Jackie | 8 | Andy On, Allan Wu |
| 2 | July 10, 2015 | September 25, 2015 | Han Geng & Wu Xin | 8 | Allan Wu |
| 3 | July 8, 2016 | September 16, 2016 | Guo Jingjing & Huo Qigang | 8 | Allan Wu |
| 4 | August 4, 2017 | October 6, 2017 | Jia Jingwen & Xiu Jiekai | 8 | Allan Wu |

- The season before season 1 relates to The Amazing Race: China Rush.

== Countries and locales visited ==
As of 2017, The Amazing Race China has visited 24 countries and 6 inhabited continents. (Note: This count only includes countries that fielded actual route markers, challenges or finish mats. Airport stopovers are not counted or listed.)

=== Asia ===
| Rank | Country | Series visited | Pit Stops |
|---|---|---|---|
| 1 | China (Note: Including the Special Administrative Regions of Hong Kong (1, 4) and Macau (4).) | 4 (All) | 7 (Note: Includes 3 Finish Lines) |
| 2 | India | 1 (1) | 2 |
| 2 | United Arab Emirates | 1 (1) | 2 |
| 2 | South Korea | 1 (1) | 1 |
| 2 | Thailand | 1 (2) | 1 |
| 2 | Japan | 1 (3) | 1 |
| 2 | Singapore | 1 (4) | 1 |
| 2 | Malaysia | 1 (4) | 1 |
| 2 | Vietnam | 1 (4) | 1 |

=== Africa ===
| Rank | Country | Series visited | Pit Stops |
|---|---|---|---|
| 1 | Namibia | 1 (2) | 1 |
| 1 | Mauritius | 1 (2) | 1 |

=== Oceania ===
| Rank | Country | Series visited | Pit Stops |
|---|---|---|---|
| 1 | Australia | 1 (2) | 2 |

=== North America ===
| Rank | Country | Series visited | Pit Stops |
|---|---|---|---|
| 1 | United States | 2 (1, 3) | 4 |
| 2 | Mexico | 1 (3) | 1 |

=== South America ===
| Rank | Country | Series visited | Pit Stops |
|---|---|---|---|
| 1 | Brazil | 1 (3) | 1 (Note: Includes 1 Finish Line) |

=== Europe ===
| Rank | Country | Series visited | Pit Stops |
|---|---|---|---|
| 1 | Greece | 2 (1, 3) | 3 |
| 1 | Spain | 2 (2, 3) | 2 |
| 3 | Turkey (Note: Includes visit to Cappadocia (2) located in Asia.) | 1 (2) | 2 |
| 3 | Sweden | 1 (4) | 2 |
| 3 | France | 1 (2) | 1 |
| 3 | Germany | 1 (3) | 1 |
| 3 | Russia | 1 (3) | 1 |
| 3 | Italy | 1 (3) | 1 |
| 3 | Denmark | 1 (4) | 1 |
