= Secret History of Princess Taiping =

2012 Chinese TV series

- Poster
- 太平公主秘史
- Genre: Historical drama
- Screenplay by: Zhao Ruiyong; Zhou Su; Hai Fei; Luo Ye
- Directed by: Lee Hon-to; Zhou Min
- Presented by: Ouyang Changlin; Zhao Ruiyong; Gong Yu; Wang Changtian; Zhang Huali; Liu Xiangqun; Zhang Yuxin
- Starring: Alyssa Chia; Zheng Shuang; Lin Miaoke; Zhang Han; Lan Yan; Li Xiang; Liu Yuxin; Yuan Hong
- Opening theme: "Old Acquaintance's Sigh" (故人叹)
- Ending theme: "Only Longing is Left on the Branches" (只剩相思在枝头)
- Composer: Yao Jiejun
- Country of origin: China
- Original language: Mandarin
- No. of episodes: 45

Production
- Executive producers: Li Hao; Yao Jia; Li Xiaoping; He Xiaoting; Xiao Ning; Dai Jingting
- Producers: Zhao Ruiyong; Zhao Ruijun; Jiang Linjing
- Production locations: Hengdian World Studios; Ejin Banner
- Cinematography: Zheng Dedao; Lu Difeng; Tian Xiuhu; Qin Zhifeng
- Editors: Cai Feixia; Yan Bin
- Running time: ≈45 minutes per episode
- Production company: Zhejiang Great Wall Television Culture

Original release
- Network: Hunan Satellite TV
- Release: 27 March 2012

Related
- Secret History of Empress Wu (2011)

Secret History of Princess Taiping (太平公主秘史) is a 2012 Chinese historical television series. The protagonist is the firstborn daughter (posthumously known as Princess Andingsi, who died in infancy according to history) of Wu Zetian, the only female emperor in Chinese history. However, in this television series, the princess survived, and when she grows up she impersonates her younger sister Princess Taiping to take revenge on her mother and attempts to seize the throne for herself. Directed by Lee Hon-to and Zhou Min, the series starred three actresses — Alyssa Chia, Zheng Shuang and Lin Miaoke — as Princess Taiping, each portraying the princess at a different stage in her life. It was first broadcast in mainland China on Hunan Satellite TV on 27 March 2012.

== Synopsis ==
In 654, during the Tang dynasty, Wu Zetian (then a concubine of Emperor Gaozong) murdered her firstborn daughter (posthumously known as Princess Andingsi) and pushed the blame to Empress Wang. The princess's wet nurse, Zhaoniang, discovers that the baby princess is still alive and smuggles her out of the palace. Zhaoniang and the young princess escape from the capital and venture further north into the desert regions. Several years later, the princess has grown up and she develops a romantic relationship with Axiena Simu, a young Tujue prince.

At one point, Zhaoniang dies trying to protect the princess. The princess learns the truth about her origins. She decides to seek vengeance on her mother Wu Zetian, who has seized the Tang throne and currently rules as a female emperor. The princess collaborates with Axiena Simu to kidnap Princess Taiping, Wu Zetian's younger daughter. As the two princesses resemble each other in appearance, the older one impersonates her younger sister and returns to the palace, where she plots her revenge and schemes to take over her mother's place as the ruler of China.

== Cast ==
- Alyssa Chia as Princess Taiping / Princess Andingsi (young adult)
- Zheng Shuang as Princess Taiping / Princess Andingsi (teenage)
- Lin Miaoke as Princess Taiping / Princess Andingsi (child)
- Lan Yan as Empress Wang
- Sun Yaoqi as Shangguan Wan'er (young adult)
- Tu Liman as Shangguan Wan'er (middle age)
- Liu Yuxin as Wu Zetian (young adult)
- Li Xiang as Wu Zetian (middle age)
- Xu Weilu as Wei Tuan'er
- Yu Xintian as Princess Anle
- Jiang Linjing as Empress Wei
- Grace Yu as Zhaoniang
- Zhang Han as Emperor Xuanzong
- Zhu Zi as Xue Shao
- Yuan Hong as Axiena Simu
- Gao Zi as Emperor Gaozong
- Ye Peng as Emperor Ruizong
- Tian Yu as Emperor Zhongzong
- Guo Qiming as Gao Qi
- Wu Yuhua as Li Chongjun
- Wang Hao as Wu Youji
- Ma Fei as Wu Chengsi
- Ye Xinyu as Di Renjie
- Ju Hui as Zhang Yizhi
- Yuan Jiabao as Zhang Changzong

== See also ==
- Secret History of Empress Wu
- List of Hunan Television dramas in 2012
