= The Amazing Race China 4 =

Season of television series

- Season 4
- Presented by: Allan Wu
- No. of teams: 8
- Winners: Jia Jingwen & Xiu Jiekai
- No. of legs: 10
- Distance traveled: 30,000 km (19,000 mi)
- No. of episodes: 10

Release
- Original network: Shenzhen TV
- Original release: August 4 – October 6, 2017

Additional information
- Filming dates: May 31 – August 21, 2017

Series chronology
- ← Previous; Season 3

The Amazing Race China 4 (Chinese: 极速前进第四季) is the fourth season of the Chinese reality competition show The Amazing Race China (Chinese: 极速前进; pinyin: Jísù Qiánjìn). Based on the American reality TV series The Amazing Race, it featured eight teams of two in a race around Eurasia. This season visited two continents and six countries and traveled over 30,000 kilometres (19,000 mi) during ten legs. Starting in Hong Kong, racers travelled through Denmark, Sweden, Anhui, Singapore, Vietnam, Guangdong, Macau, Malaysia, and Shanghai before finishing in Chuzhou. By-Health left as the main sponsor, with HeiHeiRu becoming the main sponsor for this season. The season premiered on Shenzhen TV on August 4, 2017. The season finale aired on October 6.

Married couple Jia Jingwen and Xiu Jiekai were the winners of this season, while partners Zheng Yuancheng and Wang Likun finished second, and married couple Wu Minxia and Zhang Xiaocheng finished third.

== Production ==
=== Development and filming ===
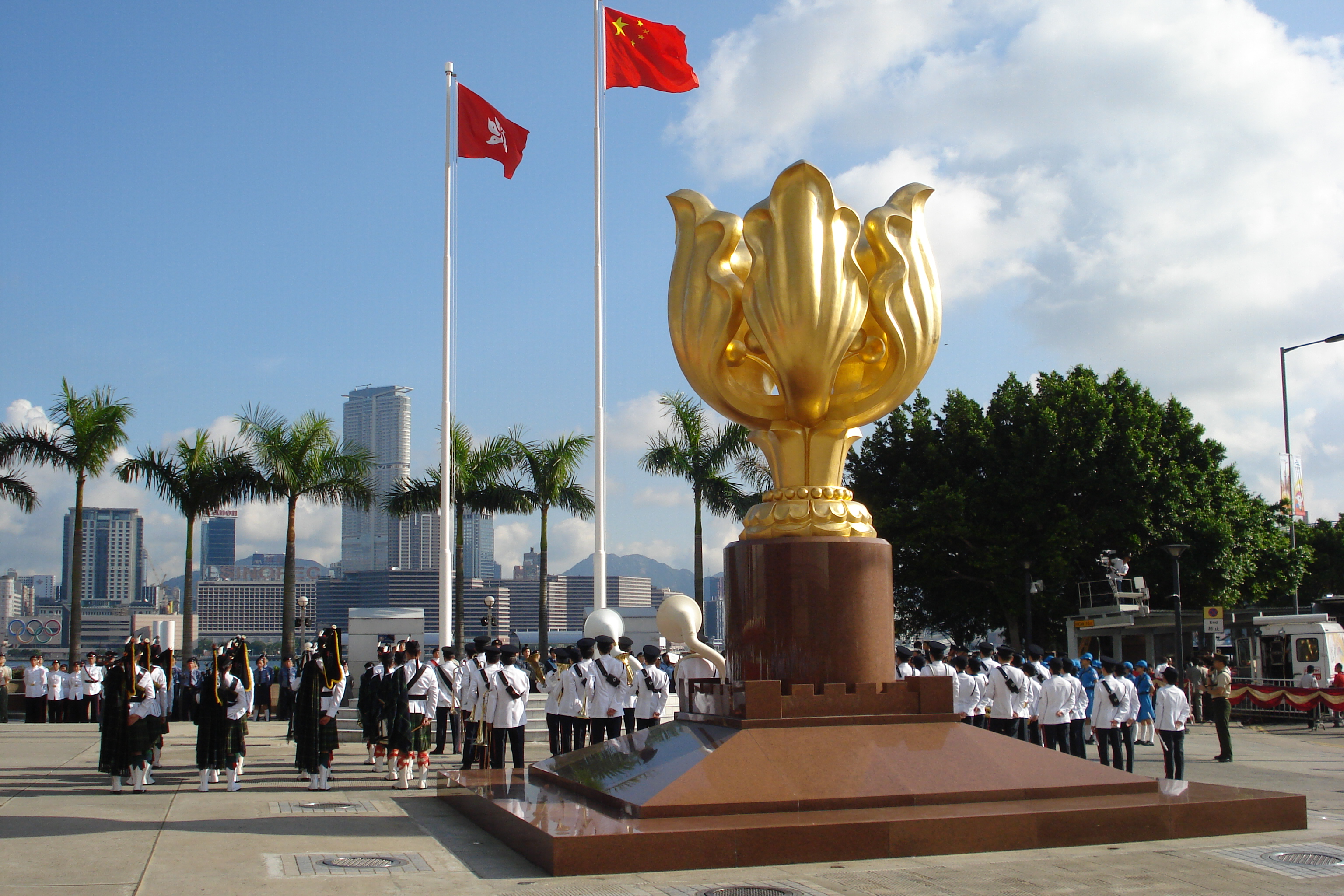
The Amazing Race China 4 started filming on May 31, 2017 at the Golden Bauhinia Square at Hong Kong. It also served as the midpoint in the finale of the first season.

Following the last season using Summer Olympics as a theme, this season used "Treasure Hunt" as the theme. Each leg was given a corresponding theme and the racecourse task would mostly focus on that theme. Each team would get a "treasure" (a toy or a prop) during legs after completing various tasks. The "treasure" would help the teams on finishing the rest of the leg (usually revealing the location of the Pit Stop). At the Pit Stop, each team received another "treasure" from the greeters, which represented the leg theme or the location's culture.

Similar to the recent Canadian and American versions, the Express Pass was given as an optional prize during Leg 1, rather than it being a definite award for a first-place finish on the leg.

An initial press release for the show claimed that the season would visit Mumbai, India, Tel Aviv, Israel and Colombo, Sri Lanka. However, once filming started, these destinations were replaced with Hefei, Macau and Kuala Lumpur.

During the Leg 1 Pit Stop in Hong Kong, teams made a handprint in commemoration of the 20th anniversary of the transfer of sovereignty over Hong Kong.

This is also the first time in the celebrity series where a team had to voluntarily quit the show, as Zhang Jike sustained an injury during Leg 6, though he and Zhang Chuanming still participated in the tasks until the Detour in Leg 7 along with the other teams. However, unlike the usual versions where the host came out on the location to inform them of their elimination, this celebrity version did not see Allan coming out to the racecourse to declare elimination in front of that team, and the results were announced after the episode ended.

Although the Finish Line was inside China, none of the eliminated teams were present at the Finish Line like the previous season.

=== Marketing ===
Heiheiru replaced By-Health as the show's main sponsor. Similar to the previous season, the Heiheiru drinks were provided for teams as their energy supplements during the leg, as well as the top three teams of the leg. Eastroc Super Drink returned to sponsor and it could still pick up their drinks as energy supplements during the leg. TMall also sponsored the preview episode, replacing Centaine shampoo.

=== Broadcasting ===
Similar to the last season, a preview episode was shown before the start of the episode.

== Cast ==
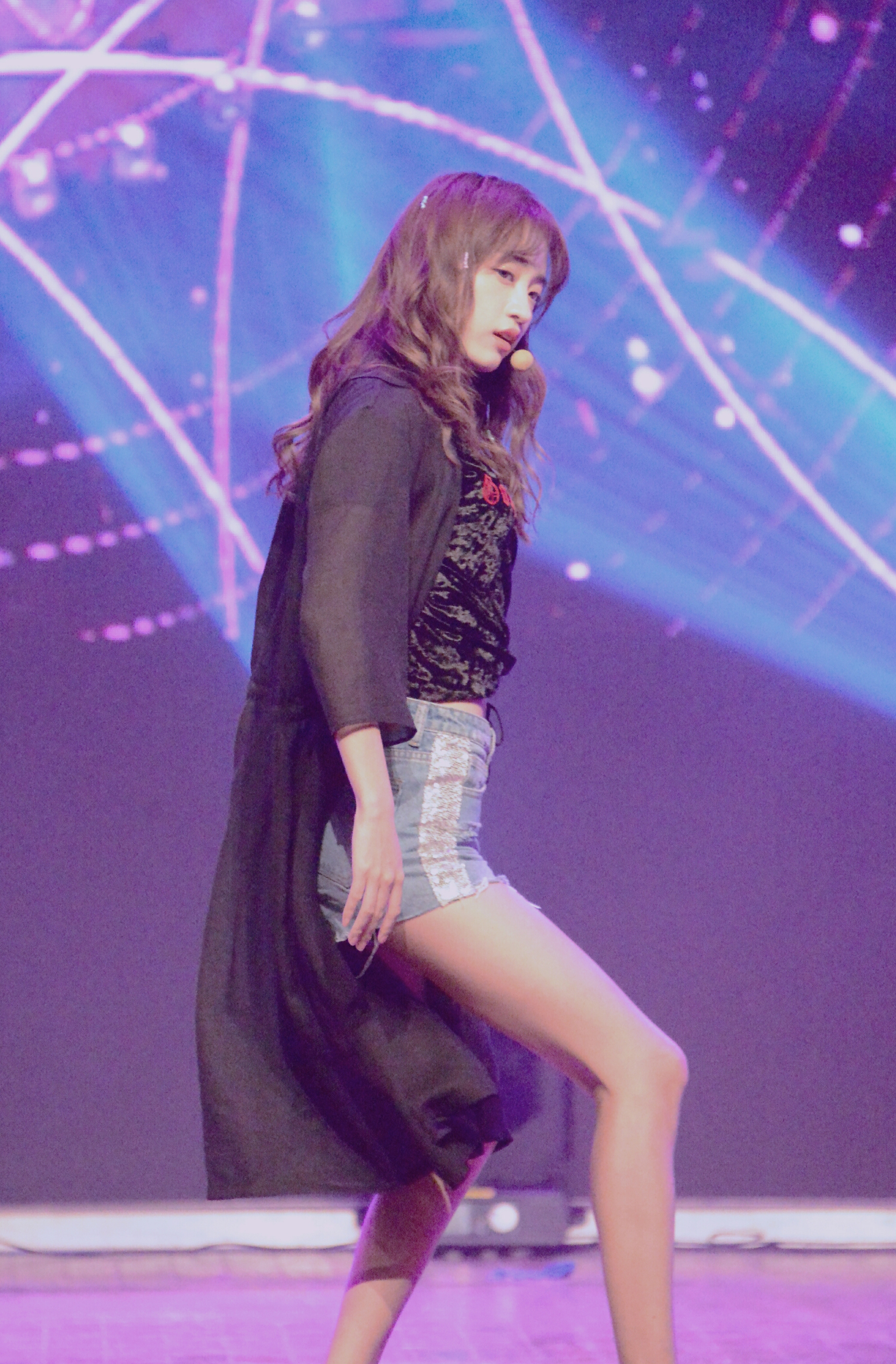
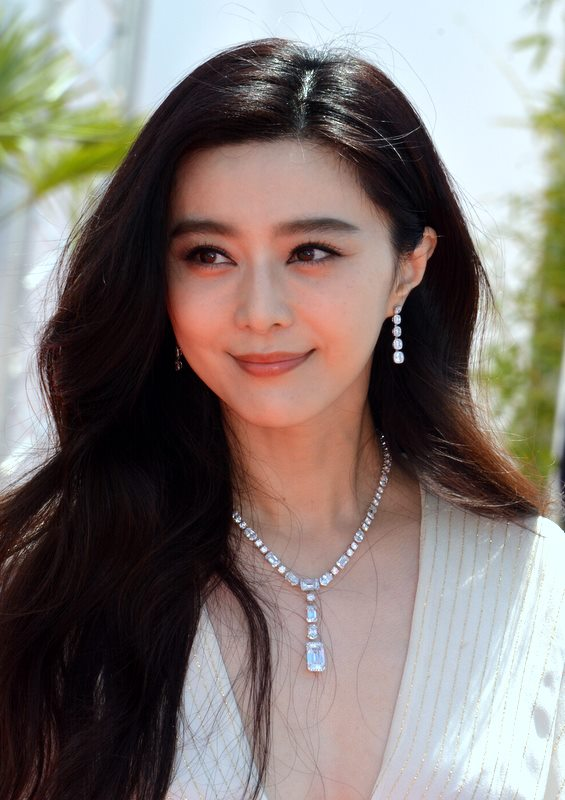
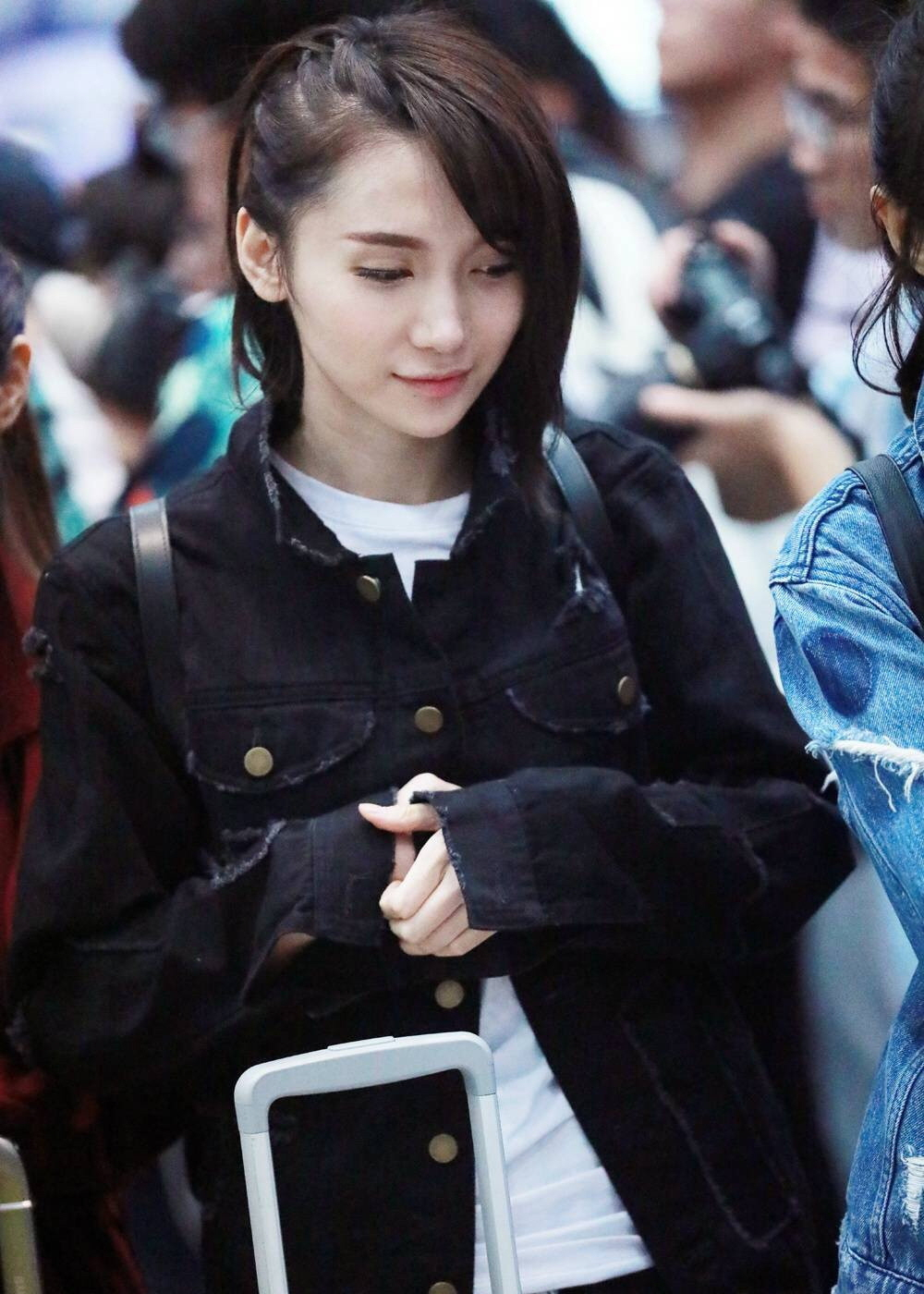
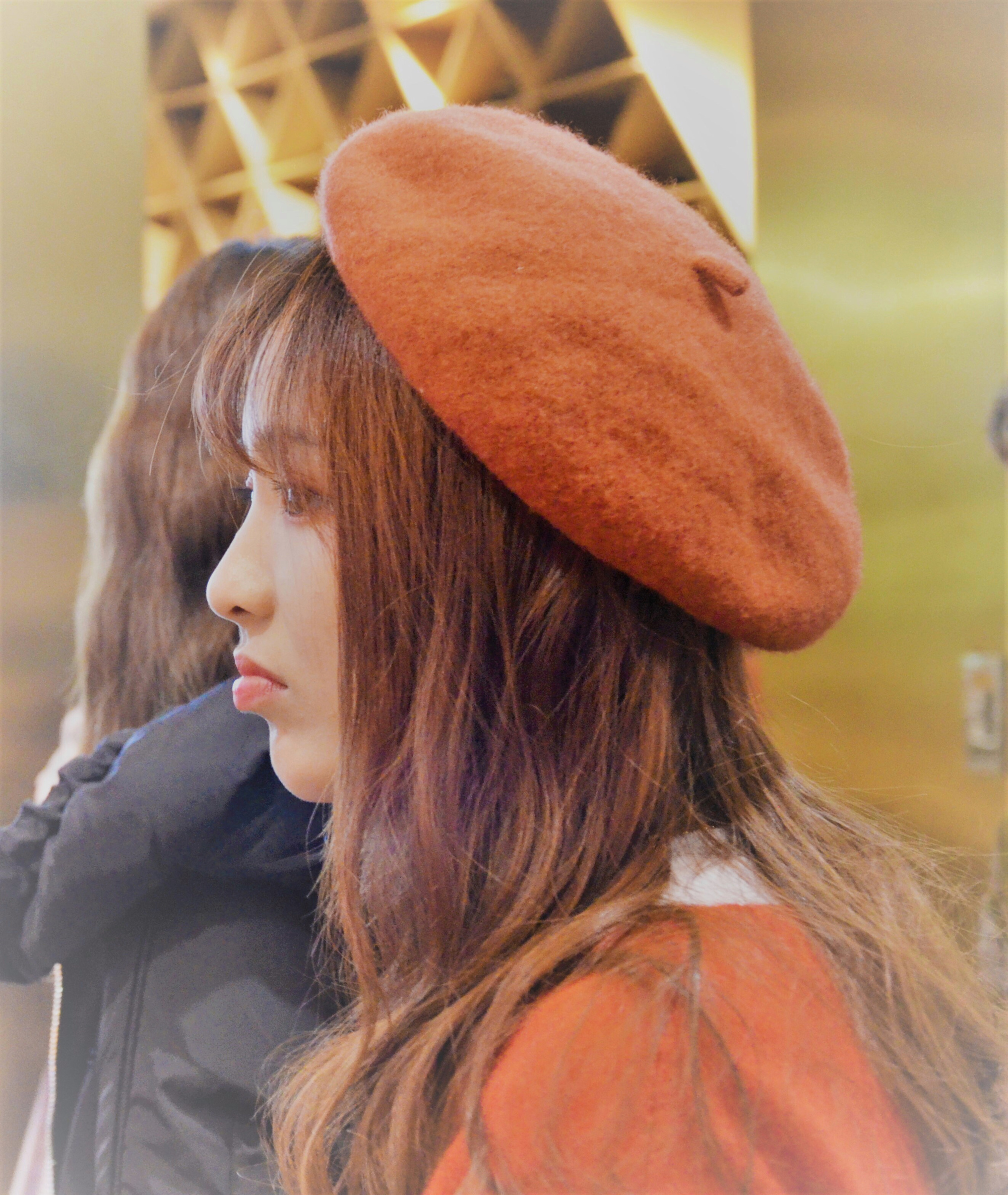
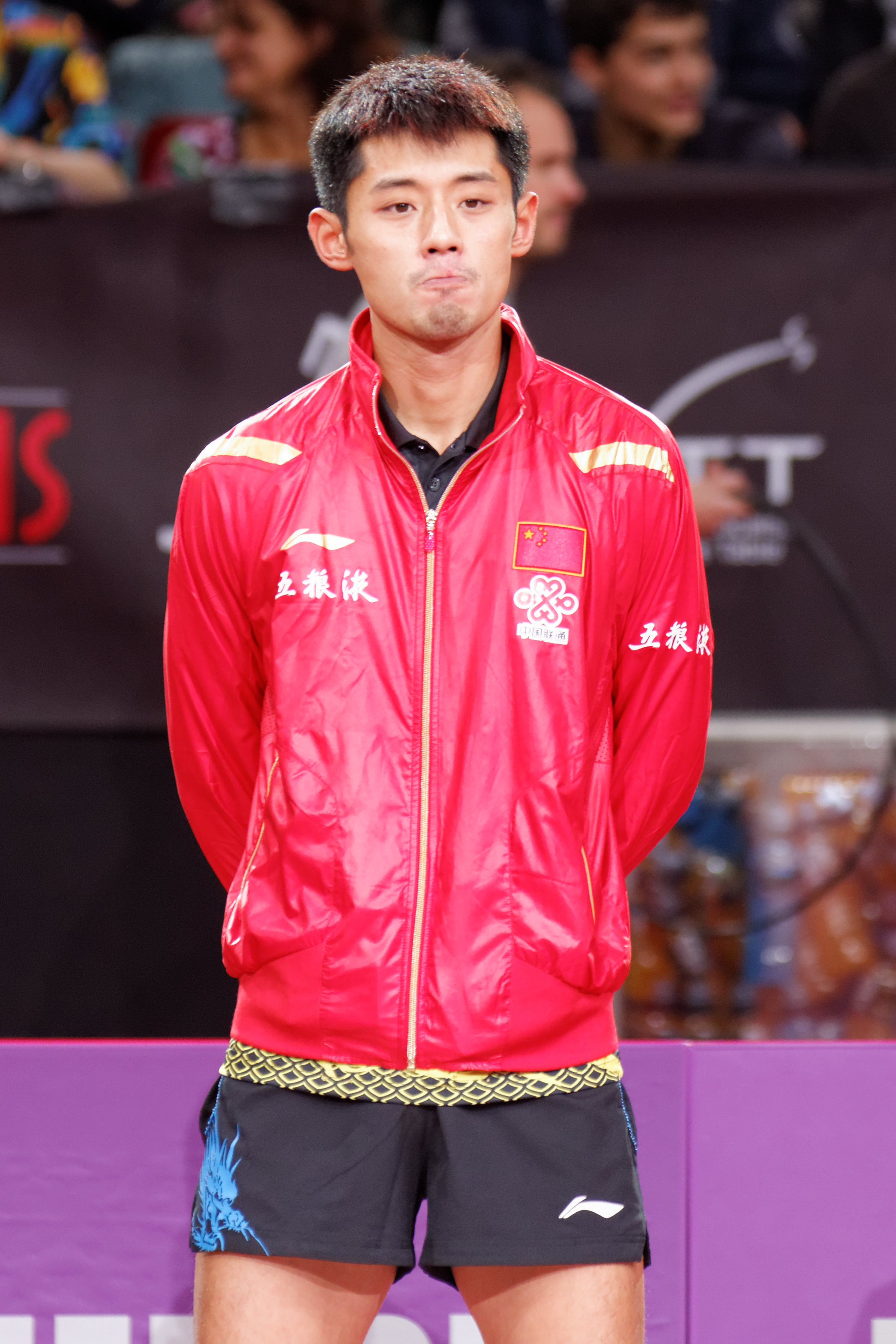
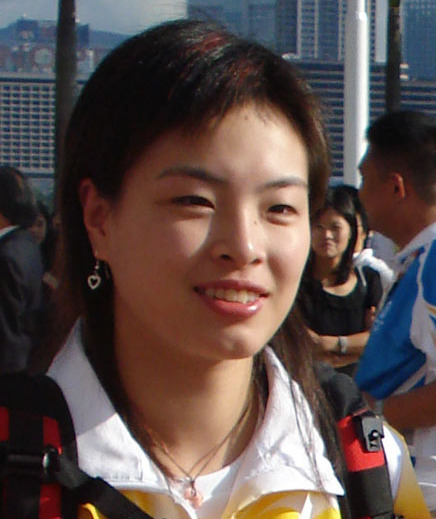
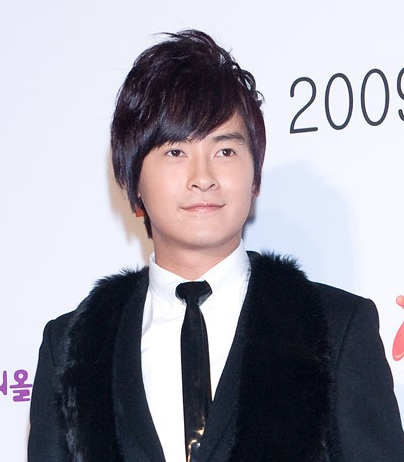
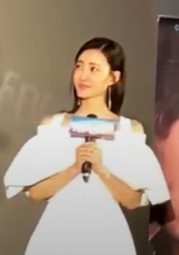
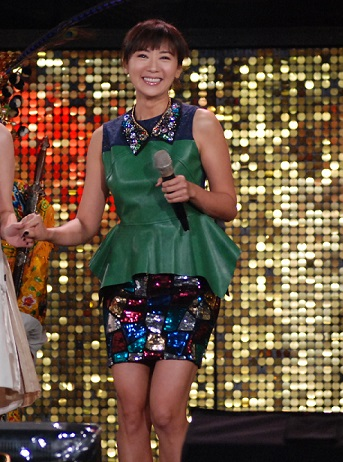
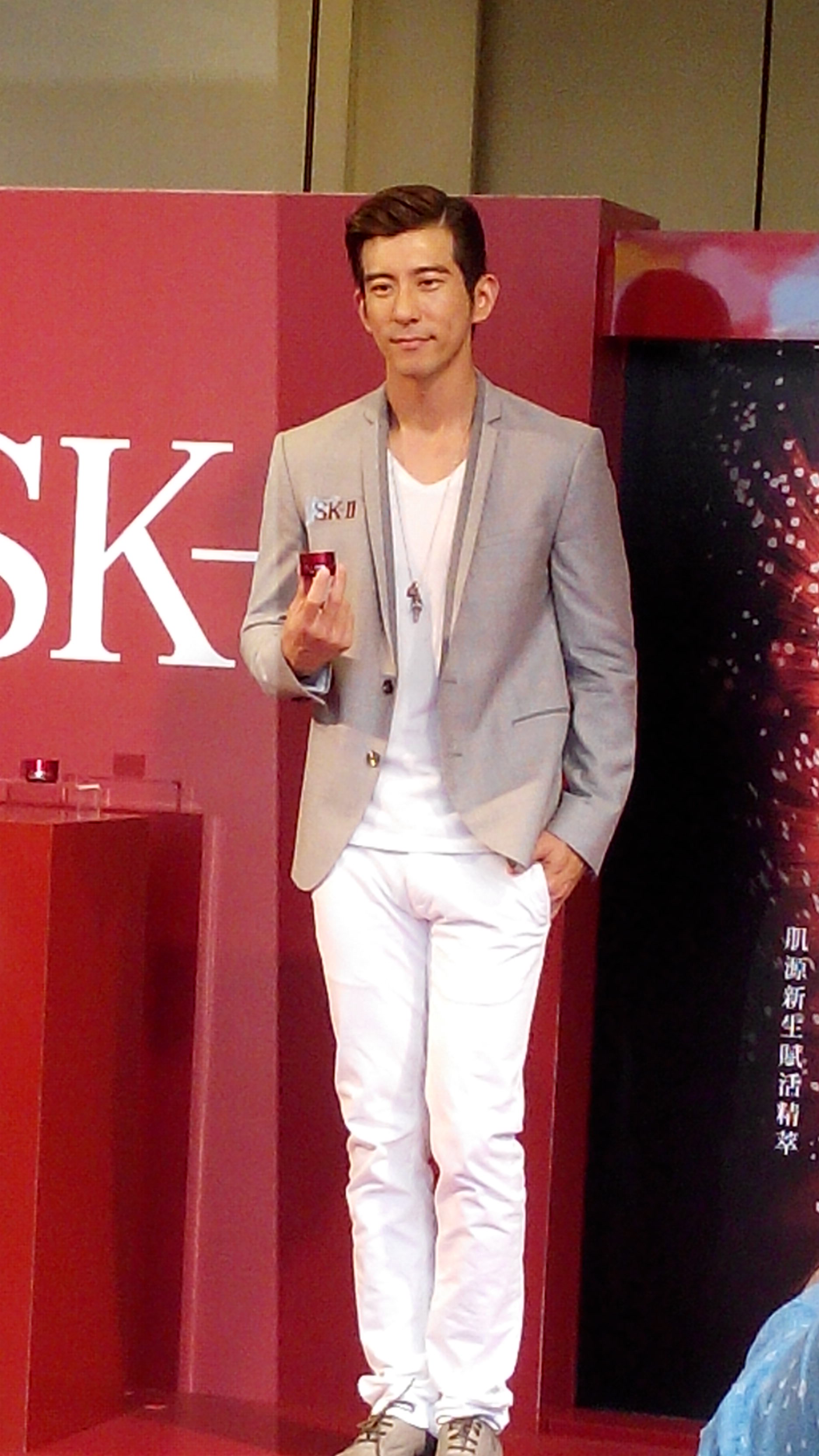
From left to right: Huang Tingting, Fan Bingbing, Lu Ting, Xuyang Yuzhuo, Zhang Jike, Wu Minxia, Zheng Yuanchang, Wang Likun, Jia Jingwen, and Xiu Jiekai

Similar to the first three seasons, this season featured celebrities who were chosen to race on the show. The new cast featured former Olympic diver Wu Minxia, whose partner in the Olympics was Guo Jingjing one of the members of the winning team in the last season, and group members from SNH48 and VARSITY-V.

Lu Ting of SNH48 was unavailable at the time of taping of the first leg due to work commitments. Another SNH48 member and Season 3 racer, Huang Tingting, substituted Lu Ting to complete the entire leg. Zhang Jike & Zhang Chuanming were also unavailable on the same leg for the same reason, but were later joined along the other teams at the start of the second leg. As a result, Leg 1 was set as a special non-elimination leg, and the Speed Bump non-elimination penalty was absent in the next leg.

Contestants	Age	Relationship	Notability	Status
Huang Tingting (黄婷婷)	25	SNH48	Singer / Actress	Temporary racer (with Xuyang Yuzhuo)
Deng Bin (邓滨)	20	Groupmates/VARSITY-V	K-Pop singer	Eliminated 1st (in Stockholm, Sweden)
Wang Xinyu (王新宇)	21	Groupmates/VARSITY-V	K-Pop singer	Eliminated 1st (in Stockholm, Sweden)
Fan Bingbing (范冰冰)	36	Friends	Actress	Eliminated 2nd (in Stockholm, Sweden)
Xie Yilin (谢依霖)	27	Friends	Actress	Eliminated 2nd (in Stockholm, Sweden)
Lu Ting (陆婷)	24	Groupmates/SNH48	Idol singer	Eliminated 3rd (in Hefei, China)
Xuyang Yuzhuo (许杨玉琢)	22	Groupmates/SNH48	Idol singer	Eliminated 3rd (in Hefei, China)
Zhang Jike (张继科)	29	Father & Son	Olympic table tennis player	Quit (in Ho Chi Minh City, Vietnam)
Zhang Chuanming (张传铭)		Father & Son	—N/a	Quit (in Ho Chi Minh City, Vietnam)
Qiang Zi (强子)	35	Colleagues	Shenzhen TV host	Eliminated 4th (in Kuala Lumpur, Malaysia)
Zhang Xingyue (张星月)	25	Colleagues	Shenzhen TV host	Eliminated 4th (in Kuala Lumpur, Malaysia)
Wu Minxia (吴敏霞)	31	Married	Olympic diver	Third Place
Zhang Xiaocheng (张效诚)	31	Married	—N/a	Third Place
Zheng Yuanchang (郑元畅)	35	Partners	Model / Actor	Second Place
Wang Likun (王丽坤)	32	Partners	Actress / Dancer	Second Place
Jia Jingwen (贾静雯)	43	Married	Actress / TV Host	Winners
Xiu Jiekai (修杰楷)	34	Married	Actor	Winners

== Results ==
The following teams participated in the season, each listed along with their placements in each leg and relationships as identified by the program. Note that this table is not necessarily reflective of all content broadcast on television, owing to the inclusion or exclusion of some data. Placements are listed in finishing order:

Team	Position (by leg)										Roadblocks performed
Team	1	2	3+	4+	5+	6	7+	8+	9	10	Roadblocks performed
Jia Jingwen & Xiu Jiekai	6th	6th	1st⊃	1st	1st	3rd^{⊂}_{⋑}	1st	3rd	1st	1st	Jia Jingwen 5, Xiu Jiekai 6
Zheng Yuanchang & Wang Likun	3rd	1st	2nd	5thə^{6}	5th^{8}	1st⋑	2nd	4th−	2nd	2nd	Zheng Yuanchang 6, Wang Likun 5
Wu Minxia & Zhang Xiaocheng	2nd	5th^{3}	4th	2nd	3rd	2nd⊃	3rd	2nd	3rd	3rd	Wu Minxia 6, Zhang Xiaocheng 5
Qiang Zi & Zhang Xingyue	4th^{2}	2nd	7th⊂	4th>	2nd	4th^{⋐}_{⊃}	4th	1st	4th		Qiang Zi 5, Zhang Xingyue 4
Zhang Jike & Zhang Chuanming		8th^{5}	6th−	6th	4th	5th	5th−^{7}				Zhang Jike 3, Zhang Chuanming 4
Lu Ting & Xuyang Yuzhuo^{1}	5th	4th	5th	3rd	6th−						Lu Ting 3, Xuyang Yuzhuo 3
Fan Bingbing & Xie Yilin	1st	3rdε^{4}	3rd	7th<^{6}							Fan Bingbing 2, Xie Yilin 2
Deng Bin & Wang Xinyu	7th	7th	8th								Deng Bin 1, Wang Xinyu 2

Key

- A red team placement means the team was eliminated.
- An underlined blue team's placement indicates that the team came in last on a non-elimination leg and had to perform a Speed Bump during the next leg.
- An underlined team's placement indicates that the team came in last on a non-elimination leg and no penalty was issued.
- A purple ε indicates that the team decided to use the first Express Pass on that leg. A magenta ə indicates the team had previously been given the second Express Pass and used it on that leg.
- An orange + indicates that there was a Face Off on this leg, while an orange − indicates the team that lost the Face Off and received a 15-minute penalty.
- A brown ⊃ or a cyan ⋑ indicates that the team chose to use a U-Turn; ⊂ or ⋐ indicates the team who received it.
- A yellow > means that team chose to use the Yield; < indicates the team who received it.

Notes

1. As Lu Ting was not available at the time of filming on Leg 1, another member of the SNH48 Team NII, Huang Tingting (黄婷婷), took over for Lu Ting for the entire leg instead.
2. Qiang Zi & Zhang Xingyue initially arrived 3rd, but were issued a 30-minute penalty as Qiang Zi touched the cables during the river crossing task, which was explicitly prohibited in the clue. Zheng Yuanchang & Wang Likun checked in during the penalty time, dropping Qiang Zi & Zhang Xingyue to 4th.
3. Due to passport problems, Zhang Xiaocheng was given an alternative flight to Copenhagen while the episode was recording. His teammate, Wu Minxia, was given an option to either sit out this leg or to perform all the tasks in that leg alone and chose the latter.
4. Fan Bingbing & Xie Yilin used their Express Pass to bypass the second Roadblock. Before using the Express Pass, Fan Bingbing elected to perform the Roadblock. This was reflected in their total Roadblock count.
5. Zhang Jike & Zhang Chuanming incurred a 2-hour penalty at the Pit Stop after Zhang Jike electing to forfeit the leg's second Roadblock. As they arrived at the Pit Stop last, they were not issued a penalty.
6. Zheng Yuanchang & Wang Likun used their Express Pass given by Fan Bingbing & Xie Yilin earlier on the leg to bypass the Face Off. As Zheng Yuanchang & Wang Likun departed 6th from the Face Off, Fan Bingbing & Xie Yilin had no one to compete against after they arrived at the location last. As a result, they completed the Face Off by themselves and thus were not issued a Face Off penalty.
7. Zhang Jike & Zhang Chuanming elected to withdraw from the show at the Detour of Leg 7 due to an injury Zhang Jike sustained during Leg 6. As a result, Zhang Jike & Zhang Chuanming did not make it to the Pit Stop. After all other teams had checked-in at the Pit Stop, instead of Allan coming to the Detour location, Allan declared Zhang Jike & Zhang Chuanming's elimination at the Pit Stop after the leg was over. In their post-show interview at the end of the programme, they "felt unable to carry on the tasks in the rest of the race".
8. Zheng Yuanchang & Wang Likun initially arrived 3rd, but were issued a 15-minute penalty as they broke the rule during Face Off where all members of the losing team must fall into the water before declared losing, which they did not follow when losing those rounds. Wu Minxia & Zhang Xiaocheng and Zhang Jike & Zhang Chuanming checked in during the penalty time, dropping Zheng Yuanchang & Wang Likun to 5th.

=== Voting history ===
Similar to the Israeli, Australian and Philippine versions, teams on the sixth leg voted for who should receive the U-Turn. The team received the most votes had to complete the other option of the Detour they did not select.

Leg	6
U-Turned	Jia Jingwen & Xiu Jiekai; Qiang Zi & Zhang Xingyue
Result	2–2–1
Voter	Team's vote
Jia Jingwen & Xiu Jiekai	Qiang Zi & Zhang Xingyue
Qiang Zi & Zhang Xingyue	Jia Jingwen & Xiu Jiekai
Wu Minxia & Zhang Xiaocheng	Jia Jingwen & Xiu Jiekai
Zhang Jike & Zhang Chuanming	Wu Minxia & Zhang Xiaocheng
Zheng Yuanchang & Wang Likun	Qiang Zi & Zhang Xingyue

== Prizes ==
The prize awarded to the first place team for each leg was a one-year supply of Heiheiru drinks, with option to donate the supplies to the needy. Additional prizes were awarded as follows:

- Leg 1 – One-night accommodation to Disney Explorers Lodge.
- Leg 2 – Two bicycle souvenirs.
- Leg 3 – One wood horse souvenir.
- Leg 10 – A pair of trophies.

== Race summary ==
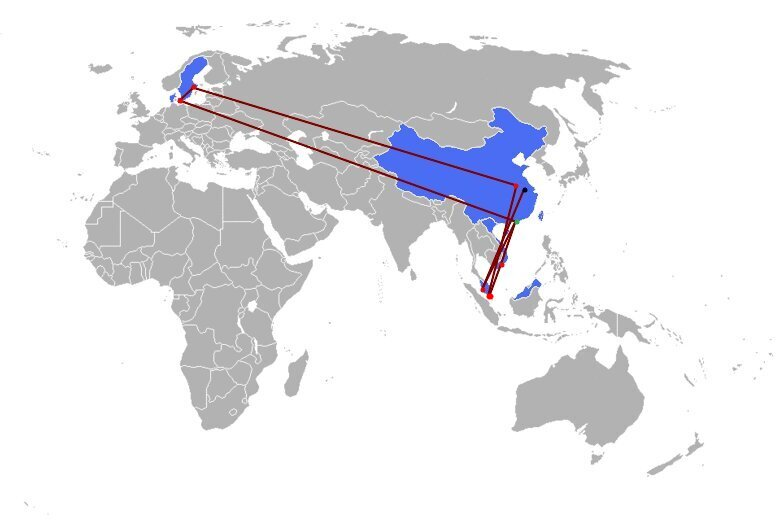
Route for The Amazing Race China 4.

Destinations	Air travel Rail travel Water travel Bus travel Helicopter travel Bicycle travel Gondola travel
Route Markers	绕道 (Detour) 路障 (Roadblock) 迅速通關卡 (Express Pass) 对抗 (Face Off) 让路 (Yield) 回转 (U-Turn) 减速带 (Speed Bump) 中继站 (Pit Stop)

=== Leg 1 (Hong Kong) ===
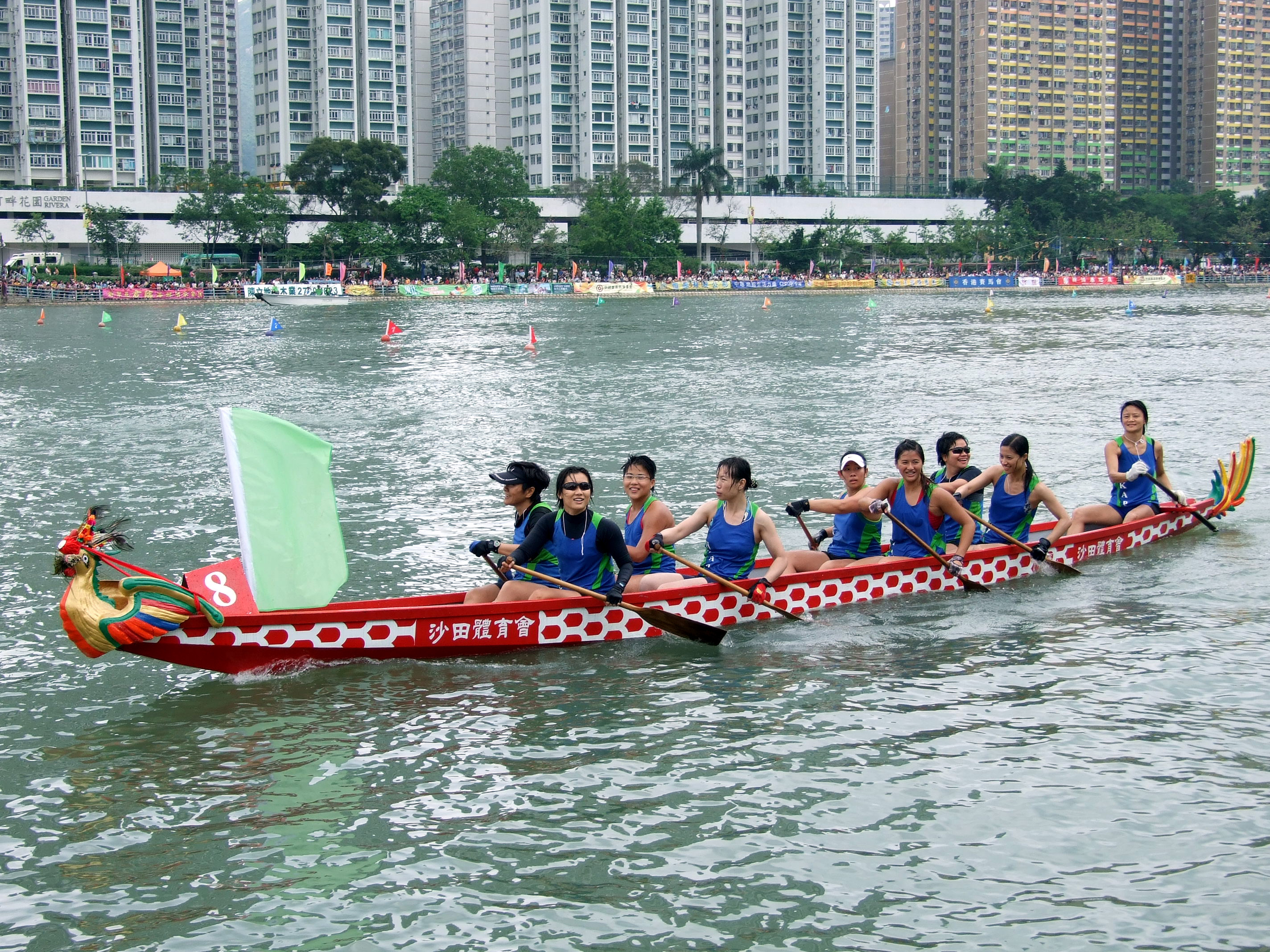
The very first challenge of The Amazing Race China 4 had teams participate in a dragon boat race in Victoria Harbour.

Airdate: 4 August 2017
Theme: 20th anniversary of the transfer of sovereignty over Hong Kong

- Wan Chai District, Hong Kong, China (Golden Bauhinia Square) (Starting Line)
- Central and Western District (Central Piers – Pier 10)
- Lantau Island, Islands District (Hong Kong Disneyland Resort – Disney Explorers Lodge)
- Lantau Island (Inspiration Lake – The Recreation Centre)
- Wan Chai District (Tai Hang – Lin Fa Temple)
- Central and Western District (Central Area – Ho Lun Jeng Gastro Pub or Sheung Wan – Lascar Row)
- Yau Tsim Mong District (Former Kowloon-Canton Railway Clock Tower)

This season's first Detour was a choice between 本草纲目 (Běncǎo Gāngmù – Compendium of Materia Medica) or 九章算术 (Jiǔ Zhāng Suànshù – The Nine Chapters on the Mathematical Arts). In Compendium of Materia Medica, teams traveled to Ho Lun Jeng Gastro Pub, where they were given a sample of six different kinds of beers, each with two different ingredients used for brewing. Teams had to search among the drawers for the six that contains two ingredients and place the correct ingredients with the corresponding beers to receive their next clue from the bartender. In The Nine Chapters on the Mathematical Art, teams made their way to Lascar Row located near Upper Lascar Street. There, teams were given a piggy bank containing 256 coins of different denominations. Using the exchange rate of eight different currencies as a reference, teams had to calculate the price conversion of HKD and write their workings onto a whiteboard. If teams provided the correct total, along with the distribution of coins onto the corresponding currencies, they would receive their next clue.

Additional tasks

- At Pier 10 of Central Ferry Piers, teams joined a dragon boat team and would compete in a 400-metre (0.25 mi) race to receive their next clue in order they finished the task.
- At the Disney Explorers Lodge inside Hong Kong Disneyland, team had to look through the exhibit to find pictures or objects depicting tasks or country visits related to the past three seasons of The Amazing Race China. Teams then had to describe the task to Mickey and Minnie using descriptions of pictures or objects along with the name of the task or the places visited to get their next clue from the table, and a piece of a Star Ferry model. Additionally, one of the seven clue envelopes also contained two Express Passes.
- At the Inspirational Lake Recreation Centre, teams had to slide wood blocks while suspended mid-air and retrieve a flag in a 50-metre (55 yd) rope course to receive the next clue. With only three available stations, if teams were unable to reach the red-marker line within the first ten minutes, or if either team members fell into the water, they had to relinquish the spot to other teams before they could start over.
- At Lin Fa Temple, teams had to take a pile of 300 burning joss sticks and insert the sticks onto the pomelo to complete the Pearl. When their work was to the temple supervisor's satisfaction, teams would then hold the Pearl during the dragon dance before they were allowed to get their next clue from the box.
- After the Detour, teams had to arrange the Star Ferry models that they received while completing the tasks to form the name of the Pit Stop: the Former Kowloon-Canton Railway Clock Tower (Chinese: 九龍鐵路鐘樓).

=== Leg 2 (Hong Kong → Denmark) ===
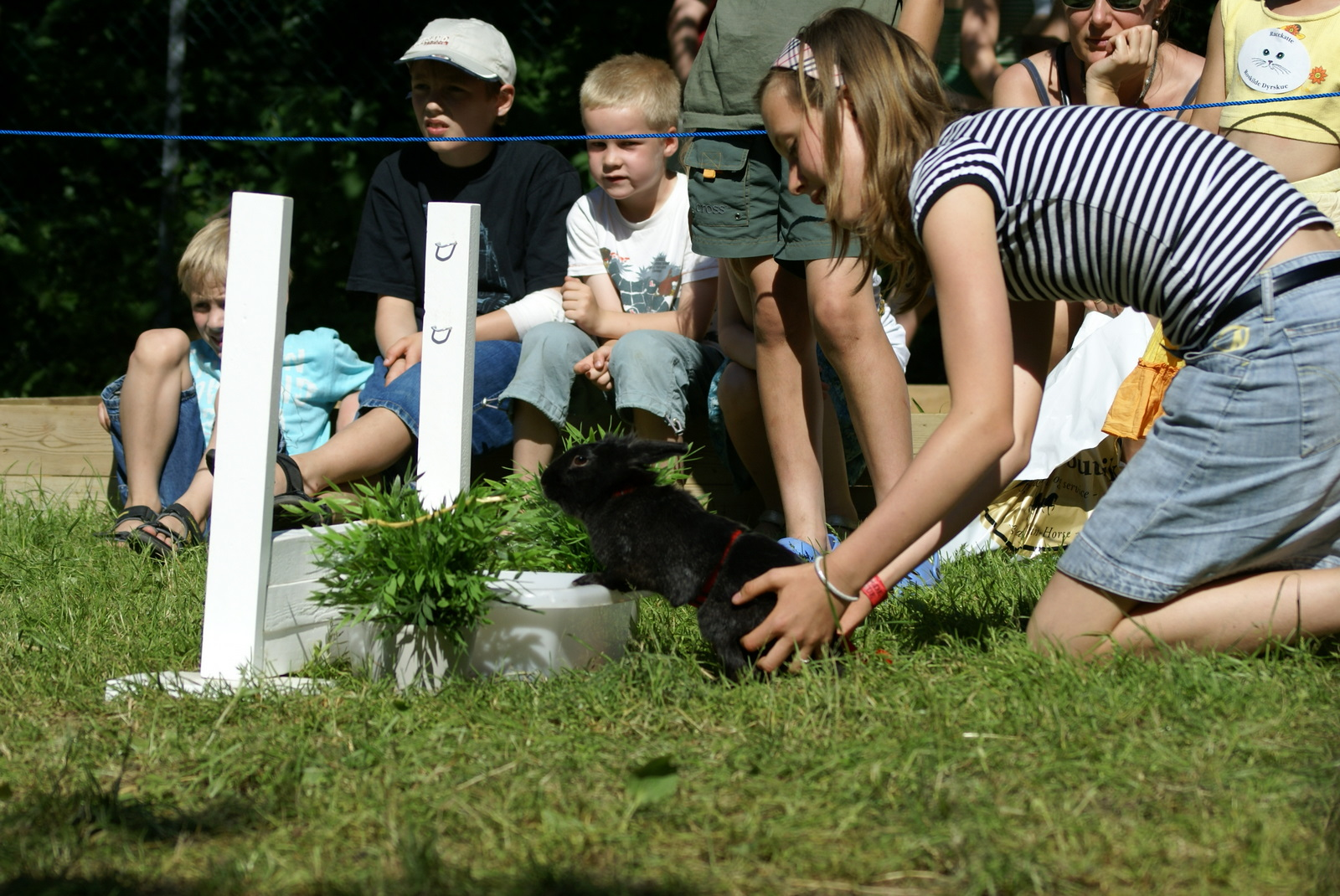
One side of the Detour had teams participate in a rabbit jumping obstacle course known as kaninhop.

Airdate: 11 August 2017
Theme: Hans Christian Andersen

- Chek Lap Kok (Hong Kong International Airport) to Copenhagen, Denmark (Copenhagen Airport)
- Copenhagen (City Hall Square) (Pit Start)
- Copenhagen (Folketeatret)
- Copenhagen (Kongens Have or Conditori La Glace (in Danish))
- Copenhagen (Refshaleøen – Urban Ranger Camp)
- Copenhagen (Islands Brygge – GoBoat to Nyhavn)

In this season's first Roadblock, one team member had to coordinate with ballet dancers to act out Hans Christian Andersen's The Ugly Duckling. The selected team member had to change clothes within an allotted time and have his/her performance approved by the ballet teacher to receive their next clue and an alphabet letter.

This leg's Detour was a choice between 直线冲刺 (Zhíxiàn Chōngcì – Straight Sprint) or 拐弯抹角 (Guǎiwānmòjiǎo – Roundabouts). In Straight Sprint, teams participated in a round of kaninhop. Once the rabbits complete an obstacle course within a minute without hitting an obstacle, they would receive their next clue. In Roundabouts, teams had to make a traditional Danish dessert known as a kransekage to the confectioner's approval to receive their next clue.

In this leg's second Roadblock, the team member who did not perform the previous Roadblock had to walk across a bridge 50 metres (160 ft) off the ground, ring a bell on the other side, then walk back across, all without touching the safety rope at any point, to receive their next clue.

Additional task

- At GoBoat's terminal, teams operated a GoBoat to search for English letters around the city to figure out the location of the Pit Stop: Nyhavn.

=== Leg 3 (Denmark → Sweden) ===
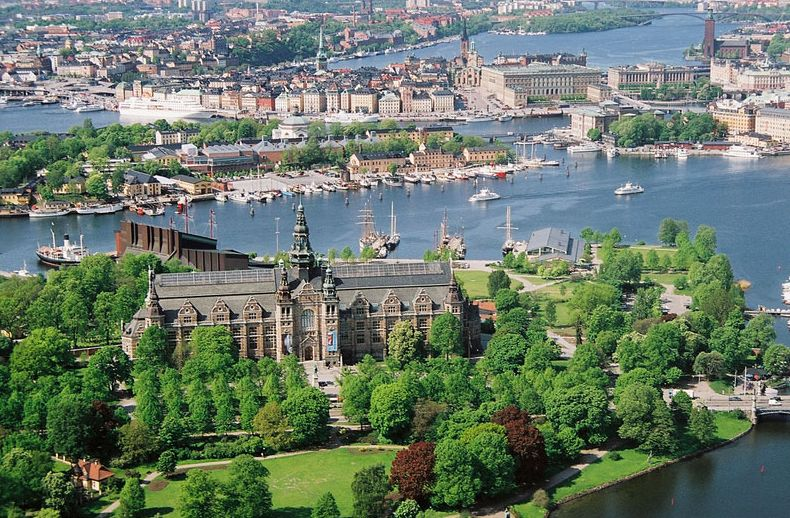
Djurgården was the main site for most of the leg, with the Nordic Museum (background) serving as the leg's Pit Stop.

Airdate: 18 August 2017
Theme: Vikings

- Copenhagen (Copenhagen Airport) to Stockholm, Sweden (Stockholm Arlanda Airport)
- Stockholm (Sjätte Tunnan)
- Stockholm (Gärdet – Djurgårdsbrunnsvägen (in Swedish))
- Stockholm (Djurgården)
- Stockholm (Djurgården – Riverside)
- Stockholm (Djurgården – Nordic Museum)

For this season's first Face Off, one member of each participating team to grab a platter of food and a Heiheiru drink. The other person on the team with the heavier plate had to finish said plate within five minutes to get their next clue; otherwise, the opposing team would receive the next clue. The last losing team had to wait out a pre-determined time penalty before they could continue racing.

For their Speed Bump, Zhang Jike & Zhang Chuanming had to make 30 Swedish meatballs known as köttbular to the chef's approval before they could continue racing.

This leg's Detour was a choice between 维京战士 (Wéi Jīng Zhànshì – Viking Warrior) or 维京学士 (Wéi Jīng Xuéshì – Viking Scholar). In Viking Warrior, teams had to first saw off a piece of a log. Then, both team members had to toss an axe into the log slice to receive their next clue and a piece of the map. In Viking Scholar, teams had to pick up stones with runes written on them to spell out the Swedish proverb "There is no bad weather, only bad clothing" to receive their next clue and a piece of the treasure map. Each person could only carry two stones at a time.

In this leg's Roadblock, one team member had to duel a person dressed as a Viking on boats and defeat the Viking by pushing him into the water to receive their next clue.

Additional tasks

- At the area near Djurgårdsbrunnsvägen, teams had to make a maypole for a Midsummer Festival to the judge's approval to receive their next clue and a piece of a treasure map.
- After the Roadblock, teams had to assemble the pieces they were given into a complete treasure map and walk their way to their Pit Stop.

=== Leg 4 (Sweden) ===
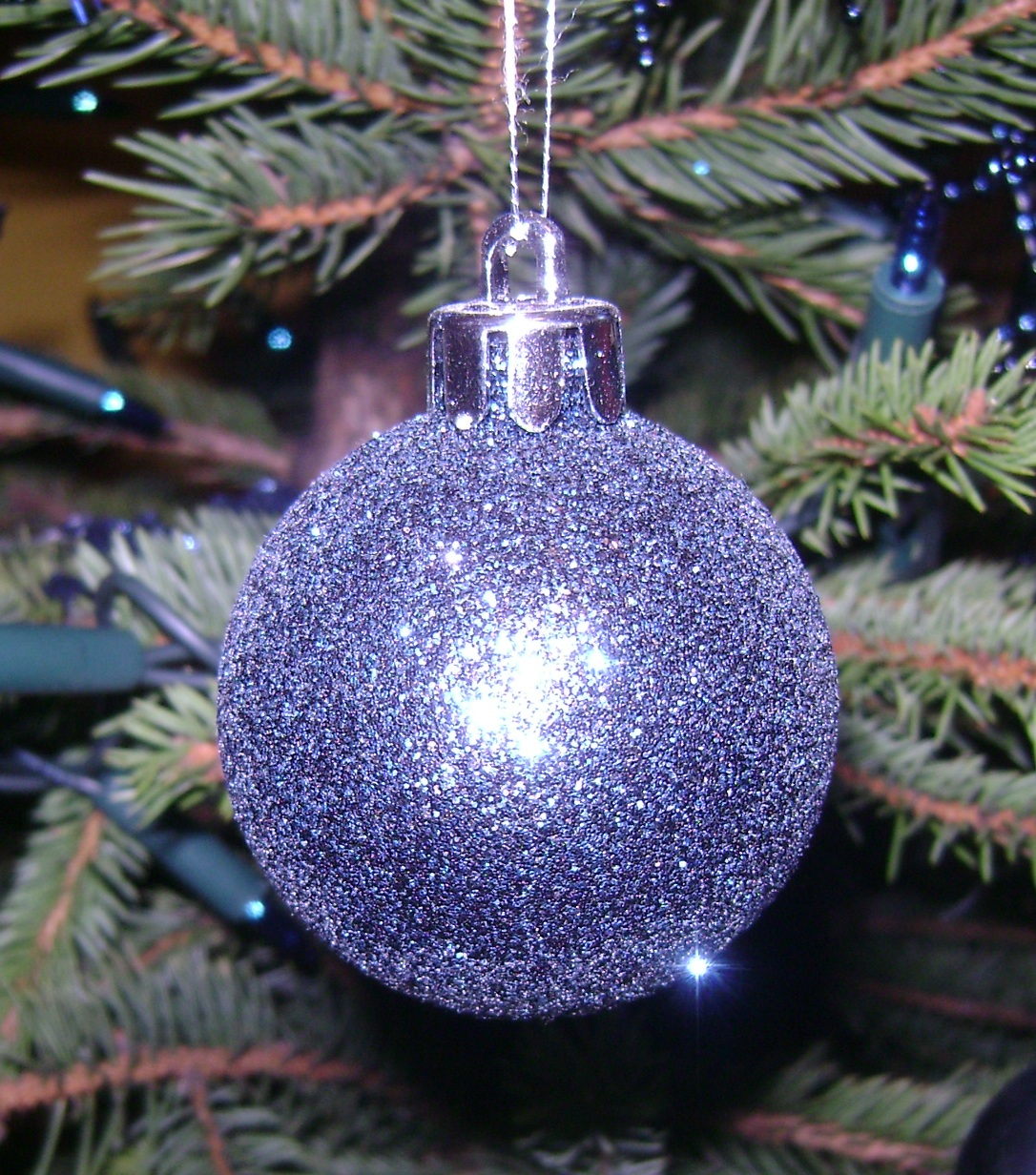
The Roadblock for the leg had one team member making a bauble out of glass given during the leg.

Airdate: 25 August 2017
Theme: Modern Stockholm/Christmas

- Stockholm (Sheraton Stockholm Hotel) (Pit Start)
- Stockholm (Gamla Stans Polkagriskokeri or Nobel Museum)
- Stockholm (Charles XII's Square)
- Stockholm (Swedish Film Institute)
- Stockholm (Skansen)
- Stockholm (Nybroplan)

This leg's Detour was a choice between 百里挑一 (Bǎilǐtiāoyī – Cream of the Crop) or 众里寻TA (Zhòng Lǐ Xún TA – Looking for Him/Her). In Cream of the Crop, teams made their way to the candy shop and search through Polkagris candies to find one with an Amazing Race flag inside the wrapper to receive their next clue and a bag of glass shards. Any candy they unwrapped had to be eaten either by themselves or by a local teams convinced. Only four teams could perform this Detour at a time. In Looking for Him/Her, teams had to search the entire museum for the four chairs that were signed by the former award recipients of the Nobel Prize based on a list written in Chinese they selected, write down the number on each chair, then relay their answers to a curator who would give them their next clue and a bag of glass shards.

For this leg's Face Off, one member from each competing team had to guide their partner who would try to solve a block-sliding puzzle/maze. Teams could reset their puzzle if they found their puzzle either too difficult to solve or has no more moves. The first team to reach the centre and grab the smartphone would win the Face Off and their next clue. The last losing team had to wait out a pre-determined time penalty before they could continue racing.

In this leg's Roadblock, one team member had to use their bags of glass shards (given during the entire leg) to create a bauble using a glass-blowing technique. When the bauble was crafted to the craftsman's satisfaction, they would receive another bauble and their next clue. With only two workstations, only two racers could perform this Roadblock at a time.

Additional task

- After passing the Yield, teams had to collect as many recyclables as they could find while walking to the Coop Medborgarplastsen. They had to deposit their recyclables into the automated recycling station and present their receipt to the attendant who would give them their next clue and another bag of glass. The team with the most recyclables collected would receive an advantage on the next leg.

=== Leg 5 (Sweden → China) ===
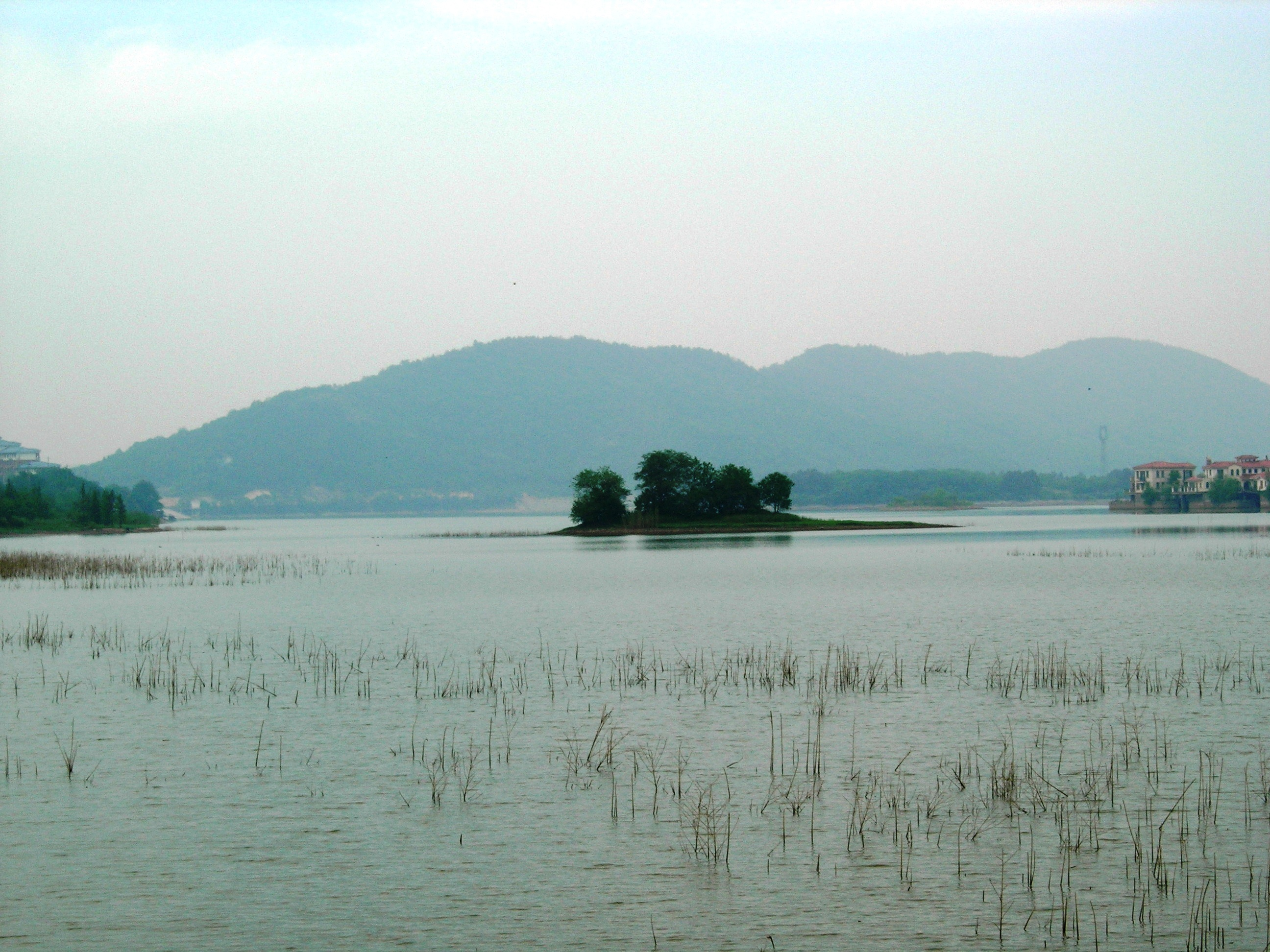
The Face Off in this leg took place at Chao Lake, where teams participate in the game of tug-of-war.

Airdate: 1 September 2017
Theme: History, Culture and People of Hefei

- Stockholm (Stockholm Arlanda Airport) to Hefei, Anhui, China (Hefei Xinqiao International Airport)
- Hefei (JAC Motors Headquarters Factory) (Pit Start)
- Hefei (JAC Motors Automotive Technology Center)
- Hefei (Chaohu Shoreline Grassland Park)
- Hefei (Binhu Wetland Forest Park)
- Hefei (Anhui Huangmei Opera Theater)
- Hefei (Huangshan Park)
- Hefei (Swan Lake overlooking Anhui Radio and Television Headquarters)

In this leg's first Roadblock, both team members would get into a JAC Refine S7 which had all of its mirrors covered. One team member had to drive their vehicle in reverse through an obstacle course using only the vehicle's omnidirectional backup camera within five minutes to receive their next clue and a calligraphy brush.

For this leg's Face Off, teams chose a pair of local teammates to join them in a tug-of-war game on floating platforms in the lake. The game ended when the first player fell into the water. The winning team would be given the next clue and a calligraphy inkstone. The last losing team had to wait out a pre-determined time penalty before they could continue racing.

This leg's Detour was a choice between 一紙千金 (Yī Zhǐ Qiānjīn – A Valuable Paper) or 愿者上钓 (Yuàn Zhě Shàng Diào – Willing to Fish). In A Valuable Paper, teams used traditional methods to make three sheets of paper. In Willing to Fish, teams would enter a pond to catch 30 crawfish. At the end of each Detour, teams would be given their next clue and calligraphy paper.

In this leg's second Roadblock, the team member who did not perform the previous Roadblock had to draw a scroll from a basket to determine their role they would play for a theatrical production of a classic historical Chinese film. They would dress up in full makeup and memorise the lines for the play (including the lyrics), which they would then perform on stage with an actor. When the judge was satisfied with their performance, teams would receive their next clue and a bottle of calligraphy ink.

Additional tasks

- At the start of the leg, teams had to choose one of eight car keys and a calligraphy box before making their way outside to a line of parked 140 identical JAC Refine S7 SUVs. They would need to find the SUV to which their set of keys belonged to using only the VIN printed on the keychain. Once found, a JAC technician would hand them the next clue. Teams could either drive the SUV themselves or hire a driver for the rest of the leg.
- At Huangshan Park, teams had to strike a drum to summon the "emperor". Then, teams would present their collected calligraphy materials for the emperor to write out the location of the Pit Stop.

=== Leg 6 (China → Singapore) ===
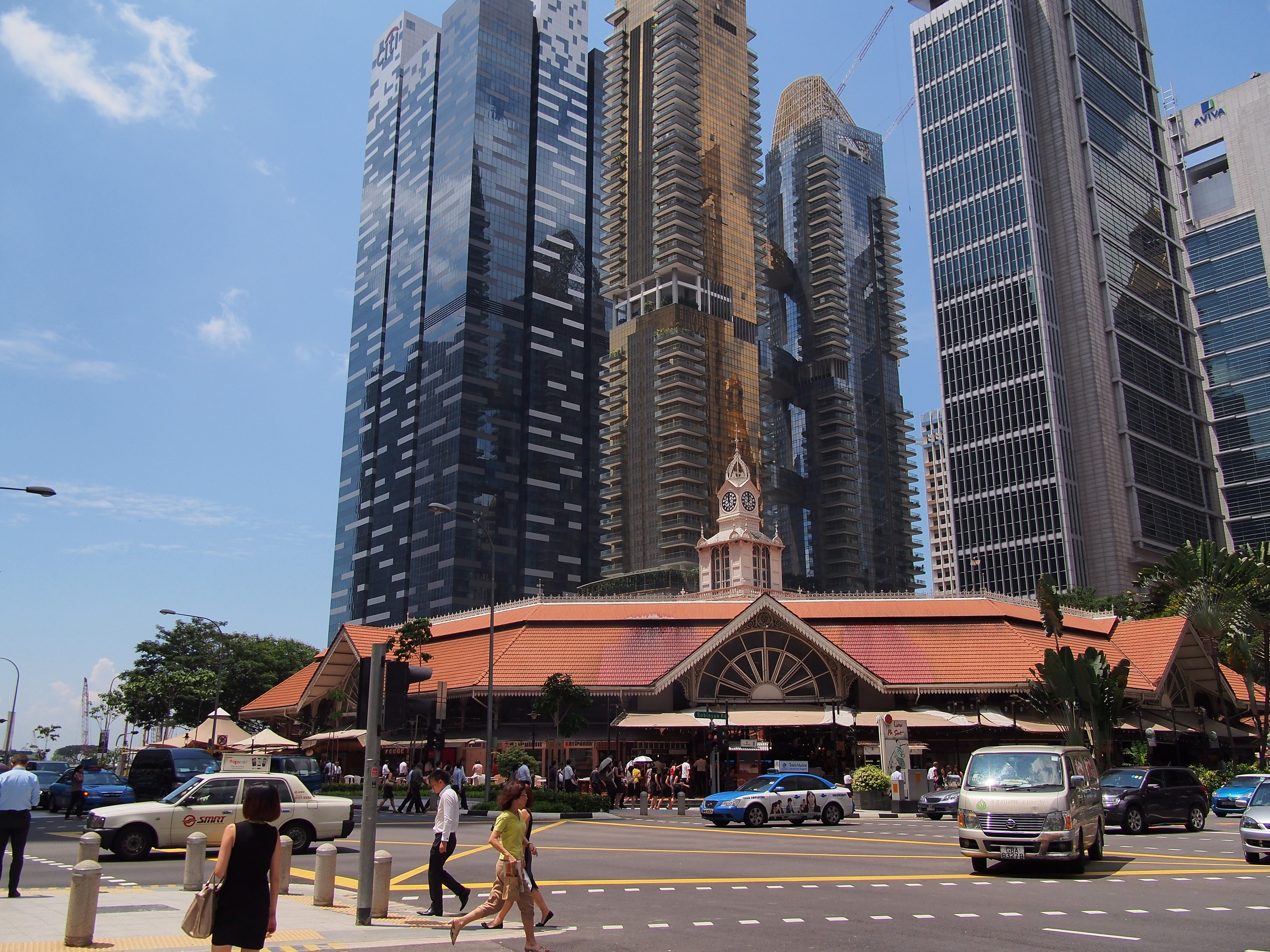
One side of the Detour took place at Lau Pa Sat, where teams had to make Singapore's popular dish of chilli crab.

Airdate: 8 September 2017
Theme: Culture diversity of Singapore

- Hefei (Hefei Xinqiao International Airport) to Singapore (Changi Airport)
- Singapore (InterContinental Singapore) (Pit Start)
- Singapore (Chinese Gardens)
- Singapore (Serangoon Road or Lau Pa Set Festival Market)
- Singapore (Chinatown Street Market)
- Singapore (138 Depot Road)
- Singapore (Kim Choo Kueh Chang)
- Singapore (Sentosa – iFly Center)
- Singapore (Merlion Park)

This leg's Detour was a choice between 金灿灿 (Jīncàncàn – Shiny Gold) or 红彤彤 (Hóngtōngtóng – Bright Red). In Shiny Gold, teams would put on a traditional Indian outfit and be weighed. They would then travel to nearby RST Jewellery and put on enough gold jewelry to raise their weight between 5 and 6 pounds (2.3-2.7 kg) to receive their next clue. In Bright Red, teams made their way to Lau Pa Sat where they had to work on Singapore's most popular dish of chilli crab. Teams had to crack open crab claws smothered in chilli sauce until they collected 500 grams (1.1 lb) of crabmeat to receive their next clue from the head chef.

In this leg's Roadblock, one team member would put on a flight suit and enter a wind tunnel for a skydiving simulation, in which they had to perform a series of maneuvers to receive the next clue.

Additional tasks

- At the Chinese Gardens, teams had to listen to several "students" of Confucius walking around the pavilion and find one reciting a Confucian proverb. They then had to use a calligraphy brush to correctly write the proverb on a scroll and present it to the master to receive their next clue.
- At 138 Depot Road gymnasium, teams had to learn and perform a Chinese lion dance, which included rolling and hoisting their team member up into the air, with a lion dance troupe on a nearby stage to receive their next clue.
- At Kim Choo Kueh Chang, teams had to use a smartphone, which had three close-up photos of patterns and designs, to search the store for three articles of clothing with the patterns on them and don the clothes to receive their next clue.
- After the Roadblock, teams had to arrange all their puzzle pieces provided during the leg to reveal the location of the Pit Stop: Merlion Park.

=== Leg 7 (Singapore → Vietnam) ===
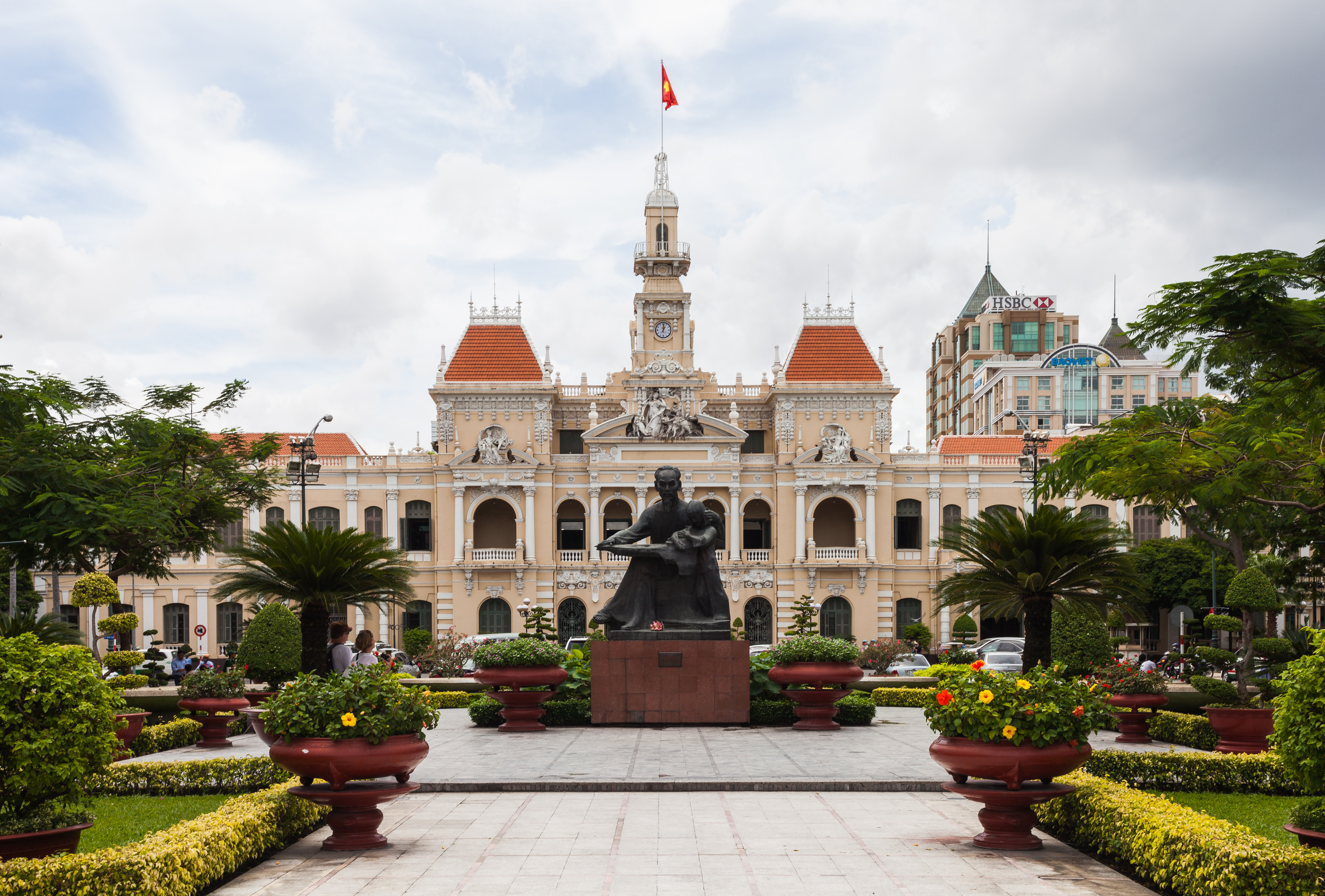
The leg's Pit Stop in Ho Chi Minh City was located outside Ho Chi Minh City Hall.

Airdate: 15 September 2017
Theme: Life of Ho Chi Minh City

- Singapore (Changi Airport) to Ho Chi Minh City, Vietnam (Tan Son Nhat International Airport)
- Ho Chi Minh City (Bình Quới Tourist Village) (Pit Start)
- Ho Chi Minh City (Saigon Central Post Office)
- Ho Chi Minh City (Cơm Niêu Sài Gòn)
- Ho Chi Minh City (Saigon Zoo and Botanical Gardens or In Khôi)
- Ho Chi Minh City (Kingdom Karaoke)
- Ho Chi Minh City (Ho Chi Minh Square)

For their Speed Bump, Zhang Jike & Zhang Chuanming had to go inside the Saigon Central Post Office and search through 1,500 postcards for the one addressed to them, which they would exchange for the next clue.

For this leg's Face Off, one team member from each team had to break open clay pots to retrieve patties of rice. From behind a designated line, they would throw each patty to their partner in a way that it soars over a brick ceiling beam, and the partner would catch it on a plate. Once ten were caught, they had to work together to eat one of the patties. The first team to fully finish their patty received their next clue, the losing team had to wait for the next opponent. The last team remaining would wait out a pre-determined time penalty.

This season's final Detour was a choice between 含情脉脉 (Hánqíng Mò Mài – Affection) or 喜氣洋洋 (Xǐqìyángyáng – Festive). In Affection, teams traveled to Saigon Zoo and Botanical Gardens, where they were given four wedding photographs to observe that were taken somewhere in the park. They then had to dress in traditional Vietnamese wedding attire and correctly recreate all four by convincing a local to take the photographs to receive their next clue. In Festive, teams traveled to In Khôi where, using provided materials and tools, they had to design six intricate wedding invitations, each addressed to a different individual and their names written correctly, to receive their next clue.

Additional tasks

- At the Bình Quới Tourist Village, teams had to properly attach 100 shrimp baskets to a single bicycle. One team member then had to ride the bicycle to the other side of the village to receive their next clue.
- Outside Saigon Central Post Office, teams had to search for the woman holding one of the seven postcards, which had the address for the next clue written on the back on it.
- After the Detour, teams traveled to Kingdom Karaoke, where they were given a choice of four songs, all with lyrics in Chinese dialects of either Mandarin, Cantonese or Taiwanese translated into Vietnamese to perform karaoke on the stage. If they performed it correctly without making any mistakes or singing the original language, they received their next clue.

=== Leg 8 (Vietnam → China → Macau) ===
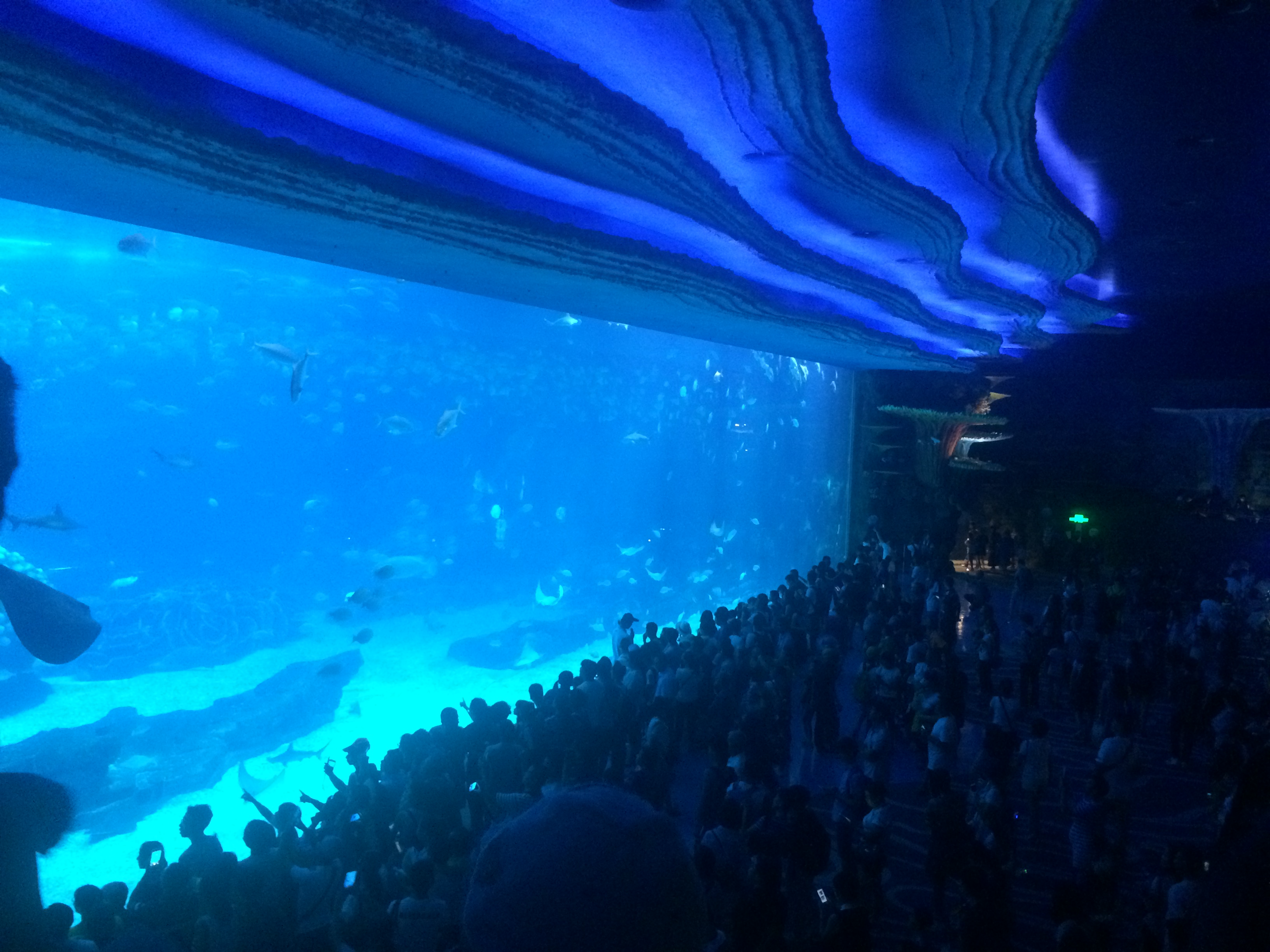
While in Zhuhai, teams dove inside the Whale Shark Exhibit Aquarium in the Chimelong Ocean Kingdom, one of the most visited oceanariums in China.

Airdate: 22 September 2017
Theme: Oceans & Resorts

- Ho Chi Minh City (Tan Son Nhat International Airport) to Zhuhai, Guangdong, China (Zhuhai Jinwan Airport)
- Zhuhai (Chimelong Ocean Kingdom) (Pit Start)
- Zhuhai (Chimelong Ocean Kingdom – Polar Explorer)
- Zhuhai (Chimelong Ocean Kingdom – Whale Shark Exhibit Aquarium)
- Freguesia de Nossa Senhora do Carmo, Macau (Macau Yeng Kee Bakery)
- Zona do Aterro de Cotai (The Venetian Macao – Grado Mini Golf Course)
- Zona do Aterro de Cotai (The Venetian Macao – St. Marco's Square)
- Freguesia de São Francisco Xavier (The Parisian Macao – Eiffel Tower)

For this season's final Face Off, teams found three large coins on a playing field made up of two half pieces – one red, one yellow. One member from each competing team had to run around the field flipping the coins so that both halves are their respective colour. The first team to fully turn all three coins to their colour received their next clue. The losing team had to wait for the next opponent, but would be able to choose which member of both teams plays in the next game. The last remaining team had to wait out a pre-determined time penalty.

Additional tasks

- In Zhuhai, a multi-part task took place within the Chimelong Ocean Kingdom. In the main entrance hall, there was a large LED display along the ceiling featuring aquatic images as well as various Amazing Race-related hints, only one of which specifically directed teams to a location ("The next task is located at the Polar Explorer Exhibit” (企鹅馆为下一任务地点)).
- At the Polar Explorer penguin exhibit, teams had to lure penguins, each with a different coloured band with beads on their flippers, onto a scale using fish. Once they correctly weighed ten different penguins, they received their next clue. Only two teams were permitted in the habitat at a time, and they had a ten-minute time limit before they had to go to the back of the line.
- At the Whale Shark Exhibit Aquarium, one team member put on scuba gear and enter the whale shark tank. From a designated area, their partner showed them five different marine animals, each of which they had to find in the tank and take a photograph of with a waterproof camera. Once all five animals (whale shark, hammerhead shark, stingray, sea turtle, and humphead wrasse) were shot on camera, with the animal fully in the photograph, they received their next clue.
- Before leaving Zhuhai, teams had to collect a Chimelong dolphin mascot plush, which they had to retain for the rest of the leg.
- At the Macau Yeng Kee Bakery, teams had to properly make 20 almond biscuits using traditional methods to receive the next clue.
- At St. Marco's Square in the Venetian Macau, teams had to choose and learn a traditional gondolier song, either "Funiculì, Funiculà" or "Santa Lucia", and sing it while riding a gondola around the resort's recreation of the canals of Venice to receive their next clue from the gondolier.

=== Leg 9 (Macau → Malaysia) ===
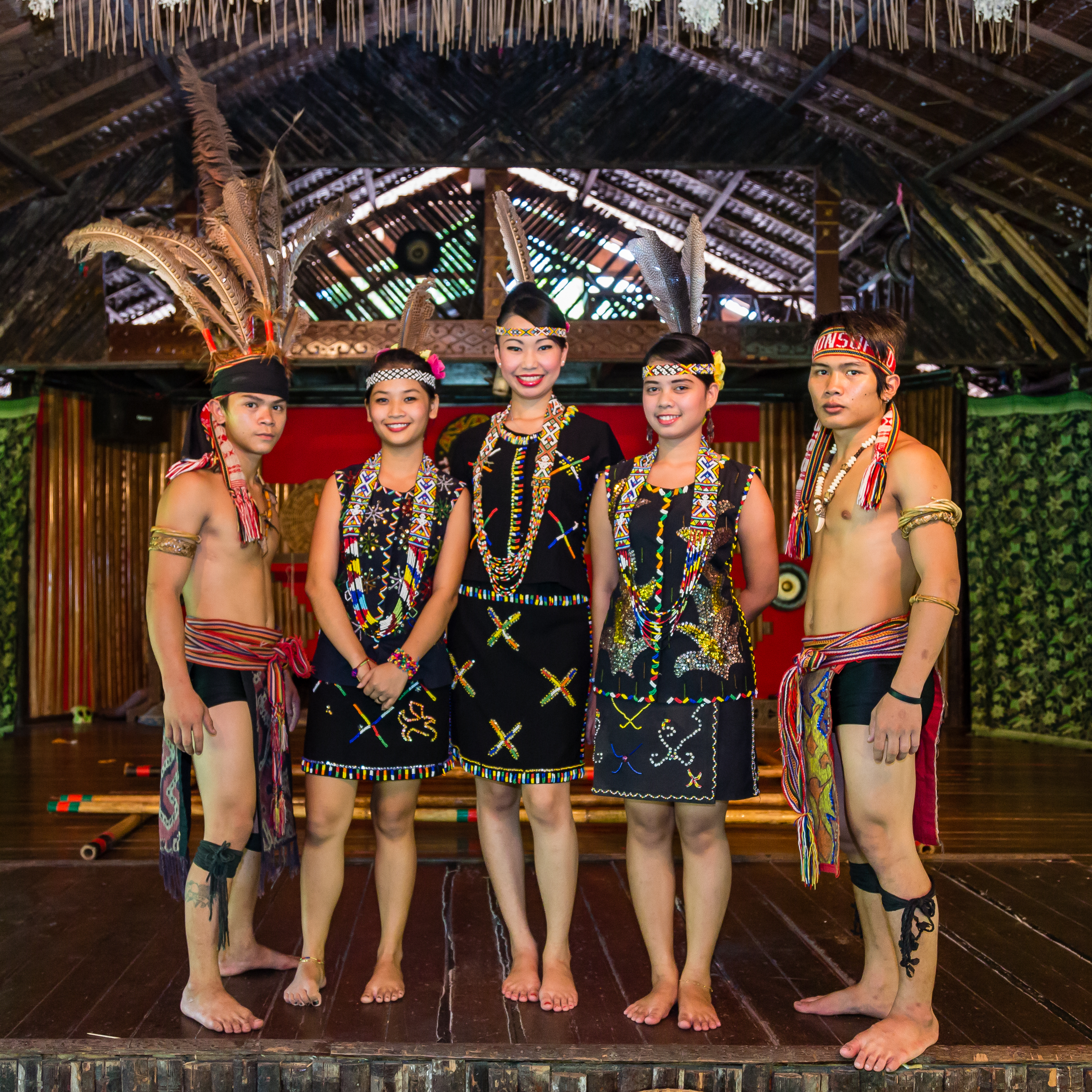
In Kuala Lumpur, the penultimate task of the leg paid tribute to the Murut people.

Airdate: 29 September 2017
Theme: Traditions of Malaysia

- Freguesia de Nossa Senhora do Carmo (Macau International Airport) to Kuala Lumpur, Malaysia (Kuala Lumpur International Airport)
- Shah Alam (The Saujana Hotel Kuala Lumpur) (Pit Start)
- Subang (Sultan Abdul Aziz Shah Airport – Airbus Helicopters)
- Putrajaya (Taman Warisan Pertanian)
- Kuala Lumpur (Perdana Botanical Gardens)
- Kuala Lumpur (Tupary Hall)
- Kuala Lumpur (Batik Studio)
- Kuala Lumpur (Berjaya Times Square – Helipad)

In this leg's first Roadblock, one team member had to pilot a helicopter. Once in the air, they were given the controls to perform three specific tasks. First, they had to increase their speed from 50 knots (93 km/h) to 90 knots (170 km/h) and maintain it for 30 seconds. They then had to perform a full 360° turn within two minutes while maintaining a steady altitude. Finally, they had to rise from 1,000 feet (300 m) to 1,500 feet (460 m) and maintain the altitude for 30 seconds. If they correctly performed all three maneuvers in succession, they received their next clue and a piece of a Buddhi Batiks sari. Only two racers could complete this task at a time, and if they failed any part of it, they would have to go to the back of the line.

For their Speed Bump, Zheng Yuanchang & Wang Likun had to break open durians and extract a total of 30 pulps from the fruits and place them into a packaging box. Once they were done, they had to eat five pulps from the box before they could continue racing.

In this leg's second Roadblock, the team member who did not perform the previous Roadblock had to climb to the top of a palm tree, then cross a series of slacklines suspended between a row of trees to retrieve two halves of their next clue. Teams had five minutes to traverse the trees without dropping any pieces. Once teams retrieved both halves of their next clue and they returned to their partner, they received their next clue a piece of a Buddhi Batiks sari.

Additional tasks

- At The Saujana Hotel Kuala Lumpur, teams would receive their first clue and a piece of a Buddhi Batiks sari.
- At Dusun Taman Warisan Pertanian teams were give a traditional blowgun and ten darts with which to shoot three hanging pineapples. Each team member had to hit at least one to receive the clue for the second Roadblock and a piece of a Buddhi Batiks sari. If they ran out of darts, they had to start over.
- After the second Roadblock, teams had to take part in a traditional dance of the Murut people. If they failed, they would be thrown off the stage. Once performed correctly, each team member had to jump on a bamboo trampoline that was adjusted to their height to grab an Amazing Race flag hanging overhead to receive their next clue and a piece of a Buddhi Batiks sari.
- In the final task of the leg at Batik Studio, teams assembled the pieces of the Buddhi Batiks saris collected throughout this leg to reveal a unique pattern that they had to recreate as they designed their own sari. After finding stencils matching their design from a set, they used them to properly apply the patterns to the fabric. If their finished sari's design matched their given example, they could then proceed to dye it and receive their next clue.

=== Leg 10 (Malaysia → China) ===
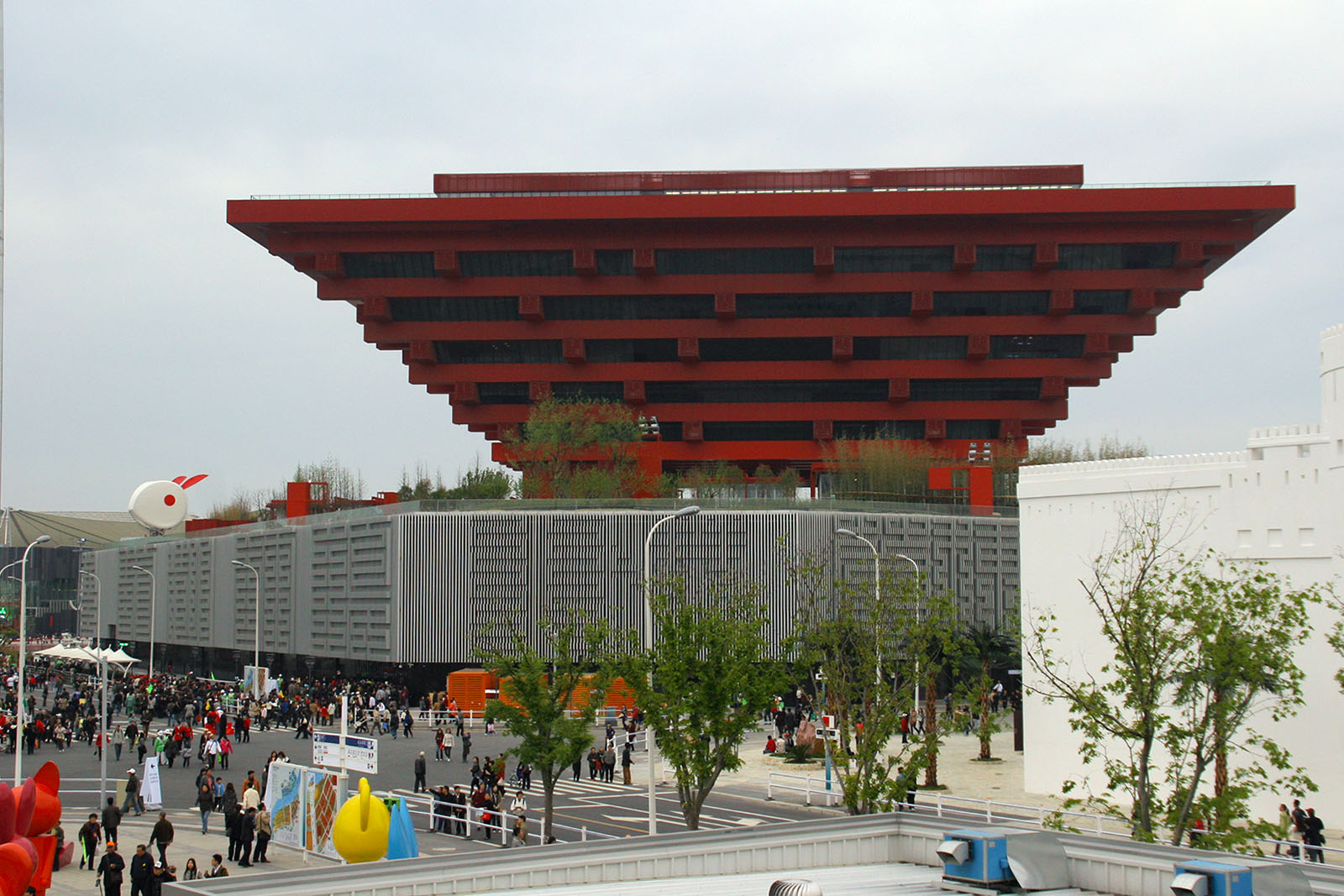
Teams visited the China pavilion at Expo 2010, now the China Art Museum, in Shanghai.

Airdate: 6 October 2017
Theme: Shanghai Culture/Tribute to HeiHeiRu

- Kuala Lumpur (Kuala Lumpur International Airport) to Shanghai, China (Shanghai Pudong International Airport)
- Shanghai (Shanghai Film Studio) (Pit Start)
- Shanghai (China Pavilion at Expo 2010)
- Shanghai (WH Ming Hotel Shanghai)
- Shanghai (114 Jiangsu Road – Blocks 18-20)
- Shanghai (Shanghai Hongqiao Railway Station) to Chuzhou, Anhui (Chuzhou Railway Station)
- Chuzhou (Heiheiru Plant)
- Chuzhou (Chuzhou Industrial Park)

In this leg's first Roadblock, one team member had to ascend the façade of the WH Ming Hotel and retrieve ten numbered markers to receive their next clue. The other team member may communicate to their partner using a speaker.

In this season's final Roadblock, the team member who did not perform the previous Roadblock had to interact with four different locals, speaking in Wu and Shanghainese dialects, to find out they want to eat and drink, search the pantry to find four plates and cups, and place them into the corresponding baskets facing the direction of the locals to receive the next clue. The answers were:

Position	Drink	Cake
South	Soda	Orange Pound Cake
West	Salted Beancurd	Yam Cake
North	Lychee	Crab Cake
East	Malt	Cream Cake

Additional tasks

- At the Shanghai Film Studios, teams were treated to a jazz step dancing performance. During the performance, the dancers would lift their legs revealing names of the dancers under their shoes. After the performance, teams would be given five minutes to write down the names of all ten dancers onto the correct pictures in the correct order, all without taking any notes. Once the team correctly identified all ten, they would receive their next clue. If teams were unable to identify all ten dancers within the allotted time, they had to watch the performance again.
- At the China Pavilion, teams had to properly assemble the sculpture design of the model of “The Bridge built by Many Men”, using the picture provided in the clue as a reference. Once the sculpture was arranged properly, they could receive their next clue.
- At 114 Jiansu Road, teams had to search for Blocks 18-20 for the next clue. Only one clue can be found in each block.
- At the HeiHeiRu Plant, teams had to complete the final memory task. Given an answer board with spaces numbered for the ten legs, they removed covers one at a time, revealing a symbol of a Roadblock, Detour, Route Info or Pit Stop, along with the task they completed or a phrase heard or read from various sources throughout previous legs. Teams then had to search through 150 identical clue boxes to find a picture depicting that task or location from that leg. When they retrieved a picture and placed it on the board in the corresponding position, a green light would indicate it was correct and they could move on to the next; otherwise they had to try again. The correct answers were:

Leg	Cities Visited	Symbol	Task/Phrase	Location
1	Hong Kong, China	Route Info	同舟之情 (Love at Same Boat, Tóngzhōu zhī qíng)	Central Ferry Piers
2	Indre By, Denmark	Roadblock	童話蛻變 (Fairytale Transformation, Tónghuà tuìbiàn)	Folketeatret
3	Djurgården, Sweden	Detour	鐵鋸戰斧 (Iron-breaking Axe, Tiě jù zhàn fǔ)	Djurgården
4	Stockholm, Sweden	Pit Stop	Welcome to Sweden	Nybroplan
5	Hefei, China	Roadblock	樹上雀成對來 (The Tree is on the Line, Shù shàng què chéng duì lái)	Anhui Huangmei Opera Theater
6	Singapore	Route Info	南獅采青 (Lion Dance on the South, Nán shī cǎi qīng)	138 Depot Road
7	Ho Chi Minh City, Vietnam	Route Info	100	Bình Quới Tourist Village
8	Macau, China	Route Info	貢多拉船歌 (Gondola Song, Gòng duō lā chuán gē)	The Venetian Macau
9	Kuala Lumpur, Malaysia	Roadblock	離天空最近 (Closest to the Sky, Lí tiānkōng zuìjìn)	Airbus Helicopters
10	Shanghai, China	Route Info	匠心匠人 (A Great Man, Jiàngxīn jiàngrén)	China Art Museum

Once all 10 spaces were correct, teams were allowed to retrieve the final clue from the HeiHeiRu milk mascot.
