= Alyssa Chia =

Taiwanese actress and television host

- 賈靜雯
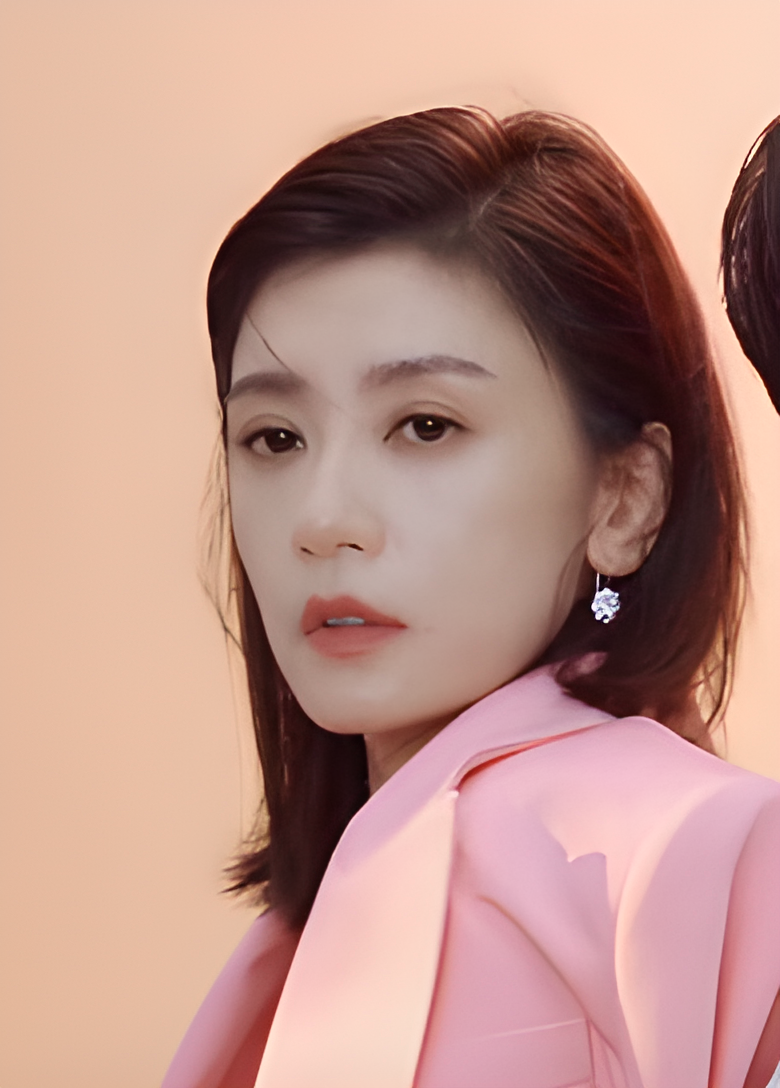
- Chia in 2023
- Born: 7 October 1974 (age 52); Taipei, Taiwan
- Other name: Jia Jingwen
- Occupations: Actress; television host
- Years active: 1990–present
- Spouses: Charles Sun (m. 2005; div. 2010) Kai Hsiu (m. 2015)
- Children: 3
- Family: Wesley Chia (brother)

Chinese name
- Traditional Chinese: 賈靜雯
- Simplified Chinese: 贾静雯
Transcriptions
Standard Mandarin
- Hanyu Pinyin: Jiǎ Jìngwén

Alyssa Chia Ching-wen (Chinese: 賈靜雯; pinyin: Jiǎ Jìngwén; born 7 October 1974) is a Taiwanese actress and television host. She is known for her roles in television series such as The Prince of Han Dynasty (2001), The Heaven Sword and Dragon Saber (2002) and Lady Wu: The First Empress (2003). She won the Golden Bell Award for Best Leading Actress for TV series The World Between Us (2019). She won the Golden Horse Award for Best Leading Actress for film The Falls (2021).

== Career ==
Chia was born in Taipei into a waishengren family; both her father and grandfather were chefs. During the 1980s, her family operated a Tianjin-style restaurant on Dunhua South Road, Taipei that specialized in noodles and dumplings. Chia appeared in commercials as a child. In 1990, at the age of 16, she was discovered by a talent scout and gained recognition through a food commercial. That year, she also appeared as a presenter on a CTS children’s program. She subsequently acted in several CTS dramas, including Jia Jia Fu.

In the early 1990s, Chia’s family closed the restaurant and moved to their ancestral home of Tianjin. She studied in the Department of Oriental Arts at Nankai University in 1993 before enrolling in the acting department of the Beijing Film Academy the following year, where Xu Jinglei was among her classmates. In 1995, after her grandfather’s investments in mainland China failed and her father was diagnosed with lymphoma, Chia withdrew during her first year and returned with him to Taipei for treatment. She appeared in 16 productions between 1996 and 1997, gaining recognition for Four Daughters, for which she received the Golden Bell Award for Best Newcomer in a Television Drama. During the production, her father’s cancer spread throughout his body, and Chia authorized the withdrawal of life support shortly before his death.

In 1998, Chia received a Golden Bell Award nomination for Best Children’s Program Host for Super Little Players. She later moved into variety television, co-hosting TTV’s weekend prime-time program Victory—Youth Corps with Show Lo, O.D, Winnie Ho, and Da Bing. By 2000, she had repaid her family’s debts and become a leading prime-time drama actress through her role in Flying Dragon in the Sky. She subsequently shifted her career to mainland China, appearing in the popular television series The Prince of Han Dynasty (2001), The Heaven Sword and Dragon Saber (2002), and Lady Wu: The First Empress (2003), bringing her early career to its peak.

Following her first marriage in 2005, Chia reduced her acting workload at the height of her career. The divorce battle in 2009 contributed to a period of professional decline.

In 2017, Chia and Hsiu Chieh-kai competed in and won the fourth season of The Amazing Race China. In 2019, she starred in the television series The World Between Us, winning the Golden Bell Award for Best Leading Actress in a Television Series. She won the Golden Horse Award for Best Leading Actress for her performance in the 2021 film The Falls. In 2023, she competed in the Mango TV reality series Ride the Wind 2023.

== Personal life ==
Chia married Charles Zhihao Sun and gave birth to her first daughter, Angelina Sun Ling Qian. Chia and Sun divorced in 2010. They share joint custody of their daughter, while Chia is the main guardian.

In 2015, Chia married actor Hsiu Chieh-kai and gave birth to her second daughter Hsiu Yun-fei. In 2017, they gave birth to their third daughter Hsiu Si-yu on 15 March;

== Filmography ==
=== Television series ===
Year	Title	Role	Notes/Ref.
1990	Jia Jia Fu	Ou Dawei	
1992	The Chicken and The Duck		
1992	Cold and Warm season		
1992	My Home Nasang Magu		
1994	We Are Cool, That Year	Niu Niu	
1994	My Father Is an Anchorman	Liu Aiyun	
1995	Crystal Flower	Sun Xiaoman	
1995	Love in Human World	Liu Mengfan	
1996	Tianshi Zhongkui	Zhaoxiao and Xiaoding	
1996	Bihai Mingyue Heart	Song Jiahui	
1996	Baby Hua family	Huarui	
1996	Chunfeng Shaonian	Zhen Lianlian	
1996	Guan Gong	Wen Xiu	
1996	Hold my hands tightly	Jiejie	
1997	Pretty and Kind Woman	Dong Huihui	
1997	Fayi Qian	Doudou	
1997	Four Princesses	Liu Xiaozhi	
1997	The Emotion Deeper Than Sisters	Ai Guo	
1998	Sleepless in Tianshi Night	Ji Xiaowei	
1998	Tomorrow Have You	Gao Yiyi	
1999	Legend of Dagger Li	Sun Xiaohong	
1999	The New Liang San Bo and Zhu Ying Tai	Zhu Yingtai	
1999	Lianlian Qingshen	Sun Xueqing	
1999	Hui Xuan Dao	Ye Xiangyu	
1999	Legend of Zhonghua Heroes	Shi Wanting	
2000	The Wife of the Elderly Brother	Liu Shuhui	
2000	Feilong Zaitian	Lin Yuhong and Bai Jianying	
2001	The Prince of Han Dynasty	Nian Nujiao	
2002	The Heaven Sword and Dragon Saber	Zhao Min	
2002	Super School	Xu Kaidi	
2003	Lady Wu: The First Empress	Wu Meiniang	
2003	Buyi Tianzi	Qingting	
2004	The Prince of Qin, Li Shimin	Yanzhi	
2004	Turn Left, Turn Right	Le Ping	
2004	The 100th Bride	Tian Yifan	
2006	Sing When You Are Sad	Guan Niangpei	
2008	Wujian Youai	Hu Mei	
2008	Jianai	Chai Zhipin	
2010	Entangling Love in Shanghai	Xiang Xue'er	
2012	Secret History of Princess Taiping	Princess Taiping / Princess Andingsi (young adult)	
2013	The Demi-Gods and Semi-Devils	Li Qiushui	Guest Star
2013	Under The Same Roof	Li Wanting	
2014	Wait For Happiness	Li Xiao Feng	
2014	The Palace: the Lost Daughter	Xingyu	Guest Star
2016	Angel Wings	Minna	
2017	Game of Hunting	Cai Wan Yu	Guest Star
2019	The World Between Us	Song Qiao An	HBO
2019	Nowhere Man	Jiang Jing-fang	Netflix Original
2020	The Sleuth of the Ming Dynasty	Imperial Noble Consort Wan	iQIYI
2022	Mom, Don't Do That!	Chen Ru-rong	Netflix Original
2022	Shards of Her	Yan Sheng-hua	Netflix Original
2023	At the Moment	Zhou Jingwen	Netflix
2025	Fight for Beauty	Zhou Jing Wen	Youku
2025	The Resurrected	Huang I Chen	Netflix
2026	Confessions - 沉默的審判		Youku
2026	Dahlia Will Bloom All The Time - 紫色大丽花	Xin Lihua	Youku

=== Variety and reality show ===
Year	Title	Note
2017	The Amazing Race China 4	Winning team (with her husband Hsiu Chieh-kai)
2023	Ride the Wind / Sisters Who Make Waves Season 4	

=== Film ===
- Spring Cactus (1999)
- Bad Girl Trilogy (1999)
- Love's Story Book (2000)
- I Must Try to Be a Good Person (2000)
- Love Doesn't Go, Love Doesn't Let Go (2013)
- (Sex) Appeal (2014)
- First Of May (2015)
- High Heels (2015)
- The Rocking Sky (2015)
- Is There No End (2017)
- The Falls (2021)
- The Kids (2023)
- Candlestick (2025)
- Log in Survival Verdict (欢迎再次登录) (2026)
- Free Will (小自由) (TBA)
- Saving Brother Ryan (荡荡荡寇志) (TBA)

== Awards and nominations ==
Year	Award	Category	Nominated work	Result
2019	54th Golden Bell Awards	Best Leading Actress in a TV Series	The World Between Us	Won
2019	2nd Asian Academy Creative Awards	Best Leading Actress (Taiwan)	The World Between Us	Won
2019	26th Huading Awards	Best Actress	The World Between Us	Nominated
2021	58th Golden Horse Awards	Best Leading Actress	The Falls	Won
2021	6th New Mexico Film Critics	Best Actress	The Falls	Runner-up
2023	29th Chlotrudis Awards	Best Actress	The Falls	Nominated
2024	59th Golden Bell Awards	Best Leading Actress in a TV Series	At the Moment	Nominated
