= The Amazing Race 1 (Chinese season) =

Season of television series

- Season 1
- Presented by: Andy On (Episodes 1–2); Allan Wu (Episodes 3–10)
- No. of teams: 8
- Winners: Wallace & Jackie Chung
- No. of legs: 11
- Distance traveled: 45,000 km (28,000 mi)
- No. of episodes: 10

Release
- Original network: Shenzhen TV
- Original release: 17 October – 19 December 2014

Additional information
- Filming dates: 21 July – 23 November 2014

Series chronology
- Next → Season 2

The Amazing Race 1 (Chinese: 极速前进第一季) is the first season of The Amazing Race (Chinese: 极速前进; pinyin: Jísù Qiánjìn), a Chinese reality competition show based on the American series The Amazing Race. It featured eight teams of two in a race around the world to win an Infiniti Q50L for each racer, CN¥1,000,000 to donate for charity and two trophies. This is the second version of The Amazing Race to be produced in China following The Amazing Race: China Rush. This season visited three continents and six countries and traveled over 45,000 kilometres (28,000 mi) during ten legs. Starting in Shenzhen, racers traveled through the United States, India, the United Arab Emirates, Greece, South Korea, and Hong Kong before finishing in Shenzhen with intermittent returns to China throughout the season. The hosts for the show were Hong Kong actor Andy On (episodes 1 and 2) and Singapore based Chinese-American actor Allan Wu, who was also the host of The Amazing Race Asia and The Amazing Race: China Rush (episodes 3 to 10). The season premiered on 17 October 2014 on Shenzhen TV and concluded on 19 December 2014.

Wallace Chung (referred to in the show as Zhong Hanliang) and his sister Jackie were the winners of this season, while married couple Li Xiaopeng and Li Anqi finished second and classmates Bai Jugang and Guan Xiaotong finished third.

== Production ==
=== Development and filming ===
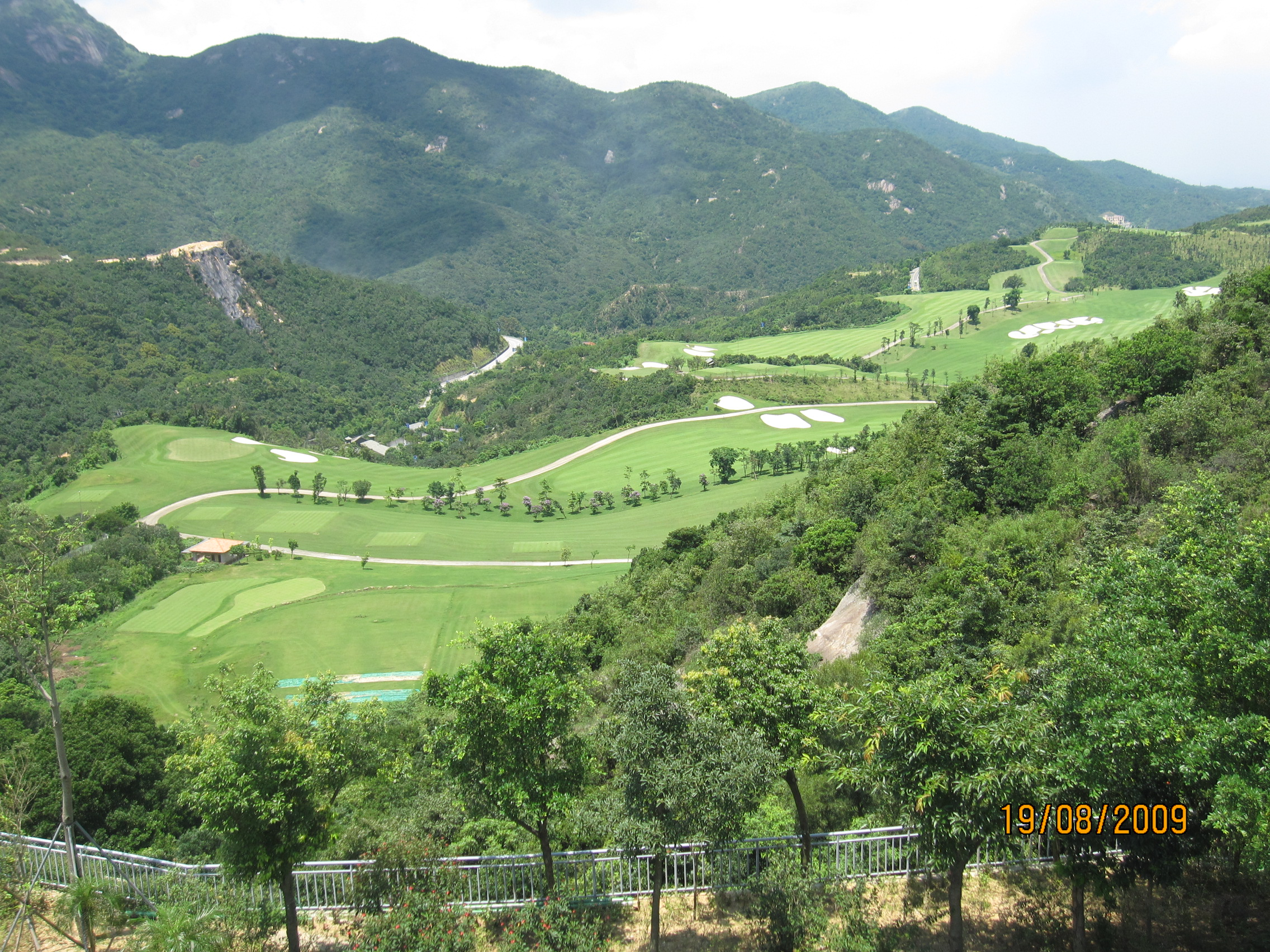
Teams began The Amazing Race by searching through balloons on the OCT East golf course in Shenzhen.

The first season was filmed from July 21, 2014 to November 23, 2014. The filming was not consecutive due to celebrities' schedule problems, differing from most international franchises.

A task originally arranged after the Detour of Leg 4 was cancelled due to terrible weather condition. The Pit Stop of Leg 8 was forced to be moved for the same reason. Previews on the official site originally cited Austria as the destination to be visited after Greece. However, during filming, this was changed to South Korea for unknown reasons.

The Yield on Leg 6 was unaired. This season introduced two twists. The Save was awarded to the winners of the eighth leg. The team that won the pass must use it and make a team that was eliminated return at the ninth leg. The Versus had teams compete against each other. The winning team receives their next clue, while the losing team waits out a 15-minute penalty.

This is the first time in an Amazing Race franchise that an elimination occurred in a double-length final leg.

=== Marketing ===
Infiniti was the main sponsor for this season. The season was also sponsored by Sohu, Satine and Eastroc Super Drink.

== Cast ==
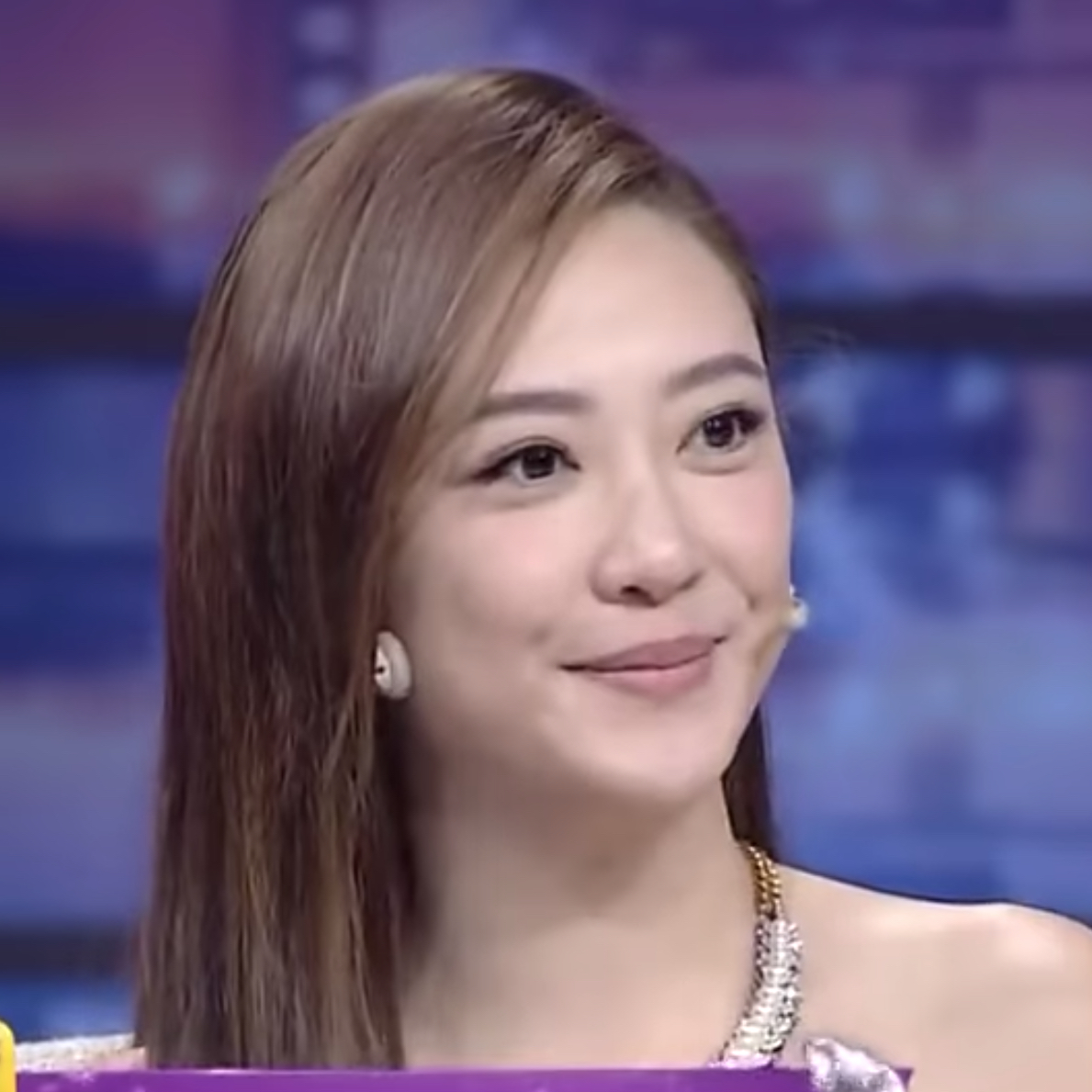
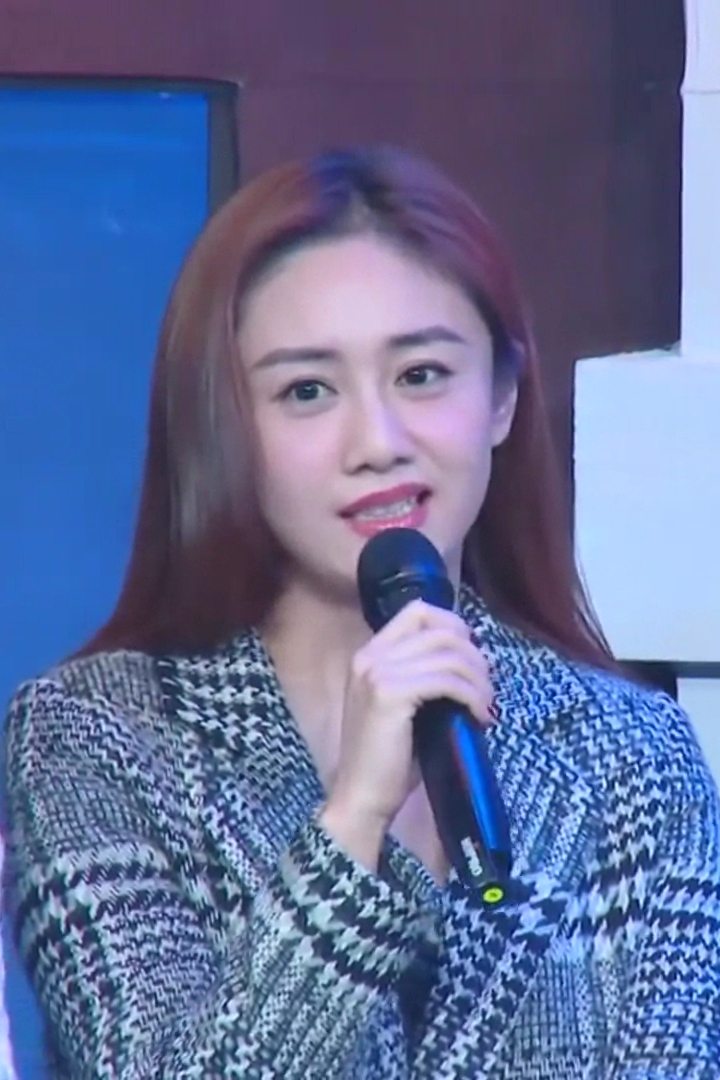
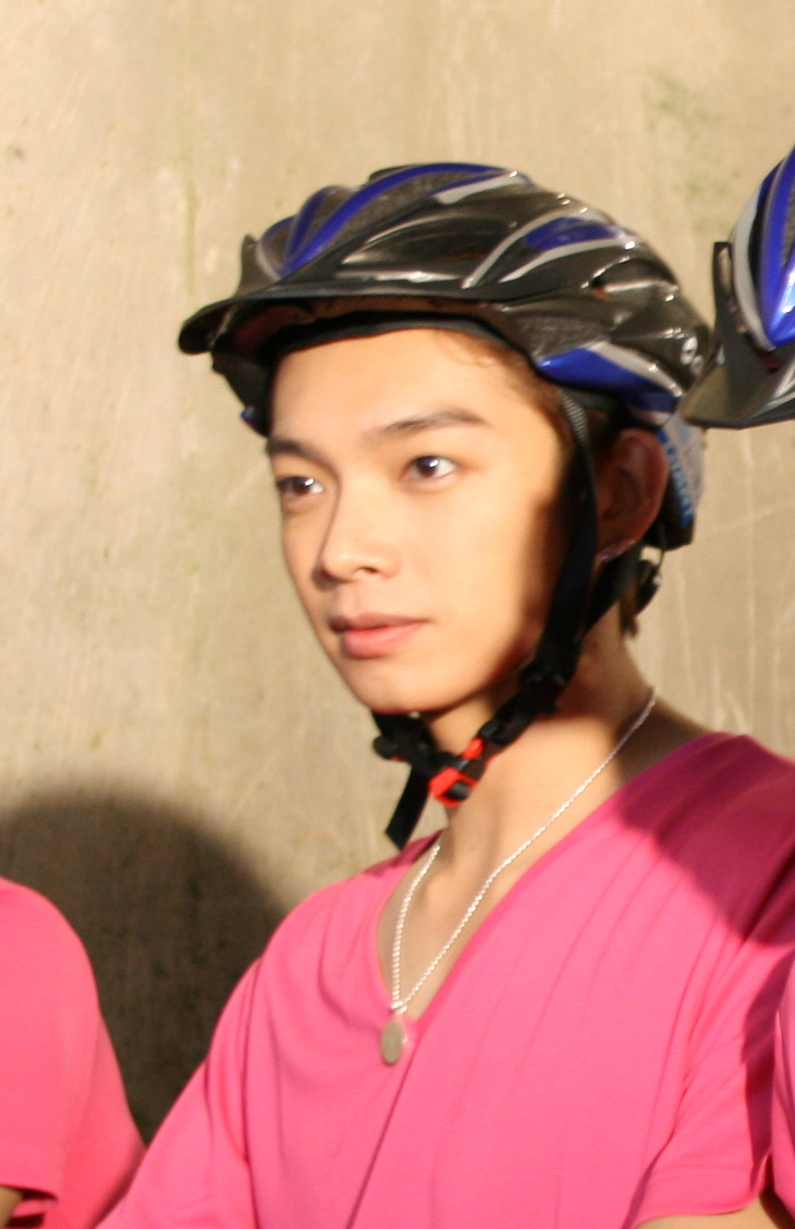
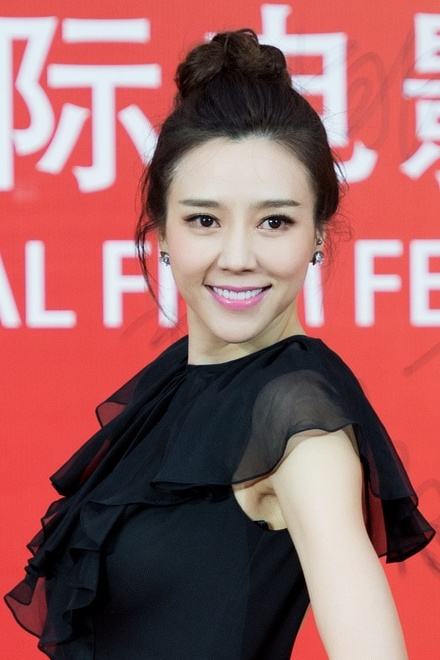
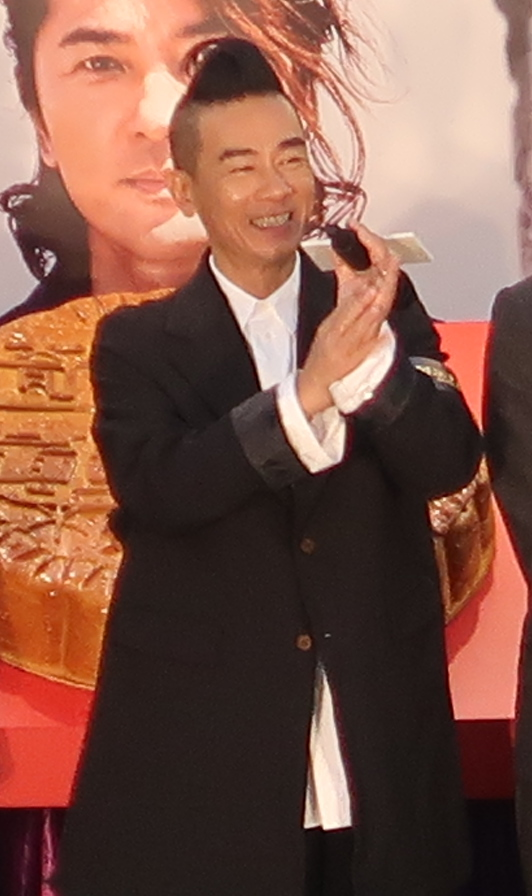
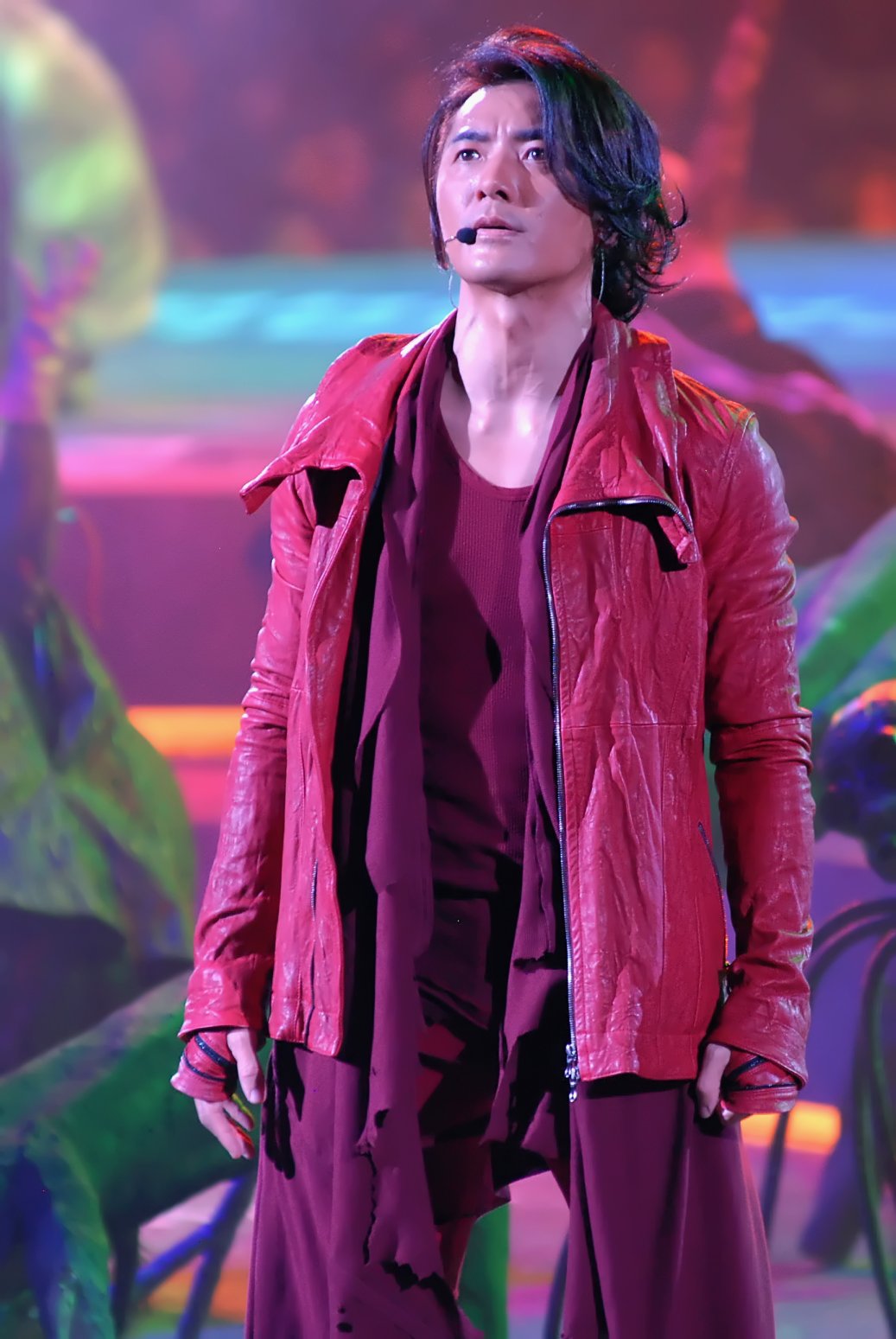
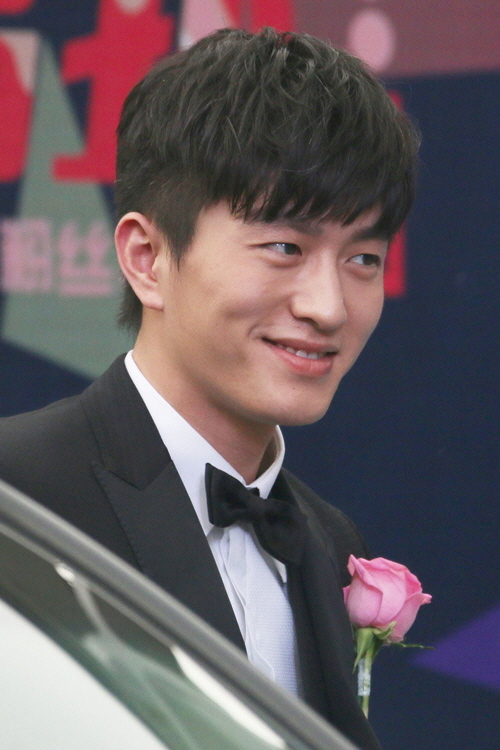
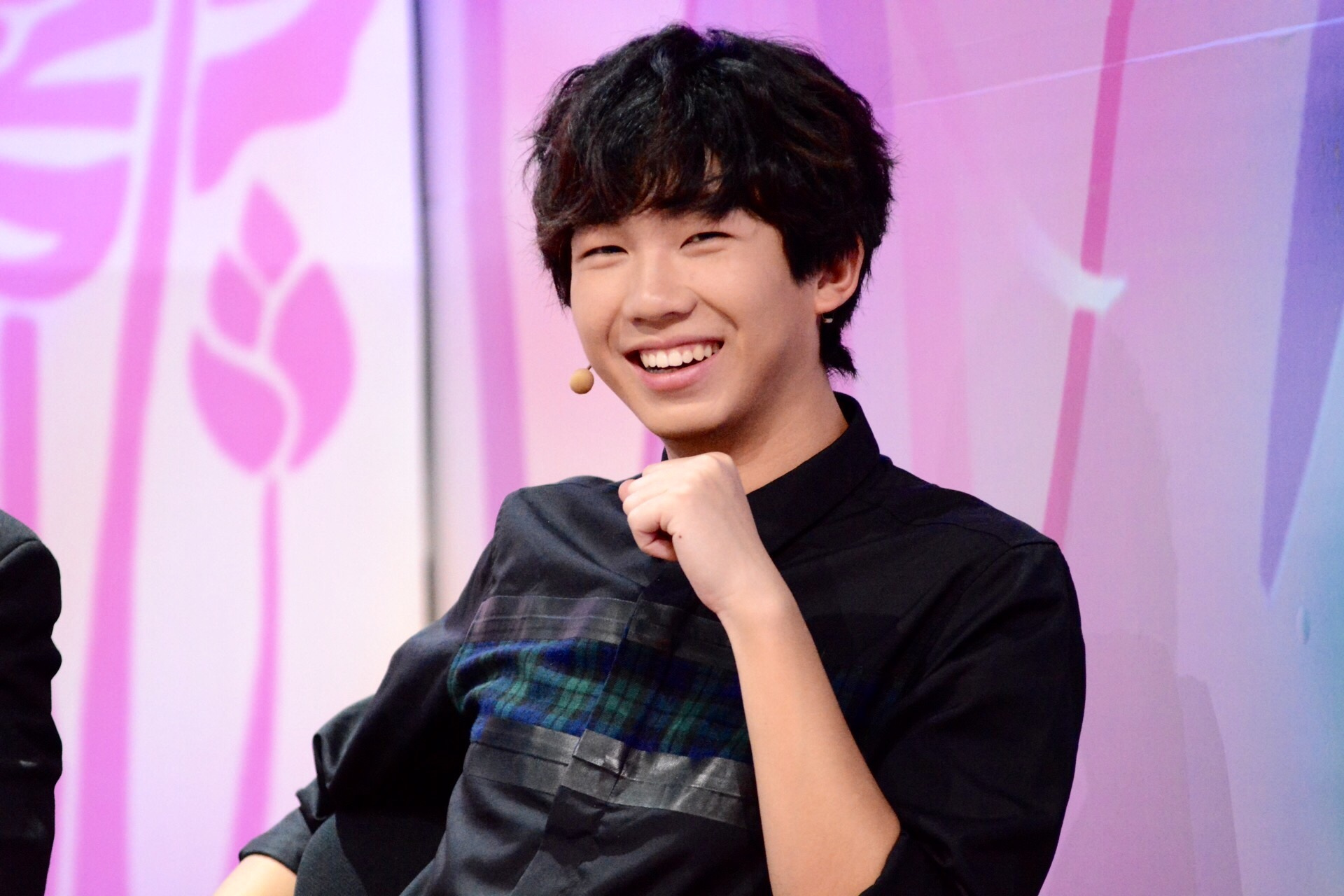
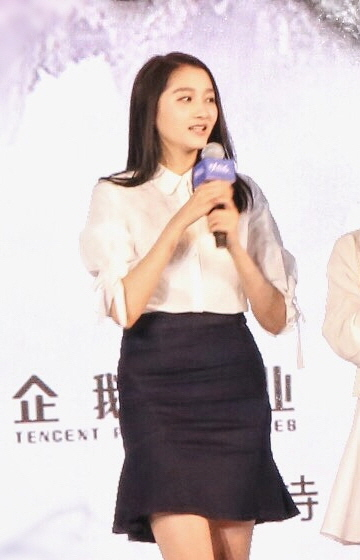
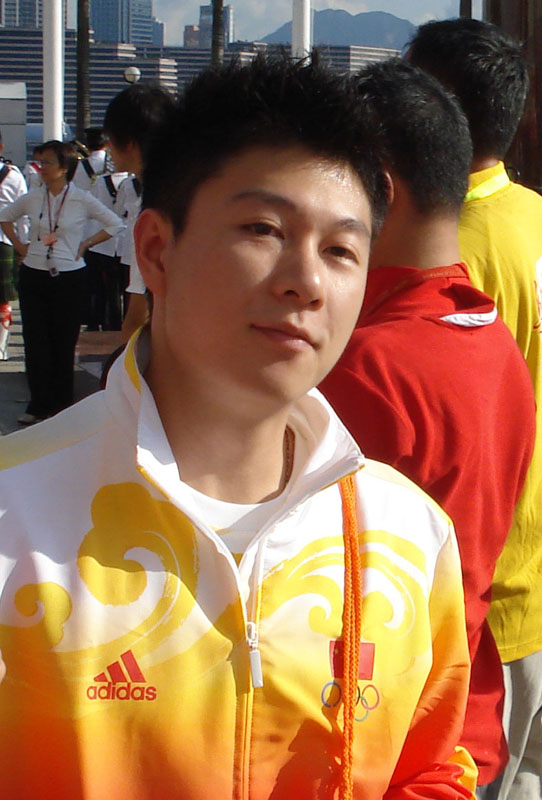
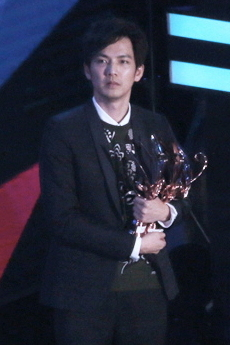
From left to right: Ying Cai'er, Liu Yun, Chen Yiru, Zhou Weitong, Chen Xiaochun, Zheng Yijian, Jin Dachuan, Bai Jugang, Guan Xiaotong, Li Xiaopeng, and Zhong Hanliang

This season was a celebrity edition featuring celebrities who were chosen to race on the show.

| Contestants | Age | Relationship | Notability | Status |
|---|---|---|---|---|
| Bai Jugang (白举纲) | (Returned to competition) | | | Eliminated 1st (in Grandview, United States) |
| Guan Xiaotong (关晓彤) | (Returned to competition) | | | Eliminated 1st (in Grandview, United States) |
| Ying Cai'er (应采儿) | 31 | Besties | Actress | Eliminated 2nd (in Delhi, India) |
| Liu Yun (刘芸) | 32 | Besties | Actress | Eliminated 2nd (in Delhi, India) |
| Zhang Tielin (张铁林) | 57 | Father & Daughter | Actor | Eliminated 3rd (in Al Ain, United Arab Emirates) |
| Zhang Yueliang (月亮) | 23 | Father & Daughter | —N/a | Eliminated 3rd (in Al Ain, United Arab Emirates) |
| Chen Yiru (辰亦儒) | 34 | Friends | Actor / Singer | Eliminated 4th (in Santorini, Greece) |
| Zhou Weitong (周韦彤) | 32 | Friends | Actress / Model | Eliminated 4th (in Santorini, Greece) |
| Chen Xiaochun (陈小春) | 47 | Bros | Actor / Musician | Eliminated 5th (in Seoul, South Korea) |
| Zheng Yijian (郑伊健) | 47 | Bros | Actor / Singer | Eliminated 5th (in Seoul, South Korea) |
| Jin Dachuan (金大川) | 21 | Buddies | Model / China Model Star contestant | Eliminated 6th (in Wan Chai, Hong Kong) |
| Liu Chang (刘畅) | 28 | Buddies | —N/a | Eliminated 6th (in Wan Chai, Hong Kong) |
| Bai Jugang (白举纲) | 21 | Classmates | Singer / Songwriter | Third Place |
| Guan Xiaotong (关晓彤) | 17 | Classmates | Actress / Singer | Third Place |
| Li Xiaopeng (李小鹏) | 33 | Married | Olympic gymnast | Second Place |
| Li Anqi (李安琪) | 27 | Married | —N/a | Second Place |
| Zhong Hanliang (钟汉良) | 40 | Siblings | Actor / Singer | Winners |
| Zhong "Jackie" Xiuping | 38 | Siblings | —N/a | Winners |

=== Future appearances ===
Liu Chang & Jin Dachuan later competed in the third season in 2016 as a replacement of another team (Huang Jingyu and Xu Weizhou) who was axed during production on the last minute.

Li Xiaopeng competed on Race the World in 2016.

== Results ==
The following teams participated in the season, each listed along with their placements in each leg and relationships as identified by the program. Note that this table is not necessarily reflective of all content broadcast on television, owing to the inclusion or exclusion of some data. Placements are listed in finishing order:

| Team | Position (by leg) | | | | | | | | | | | Roadblocks performed |
| Team | 1 | 2 | ⋐3⋑ | 4 | 5+ | 6 | 7 | 8 | 9 | 10 | | Roadblocks performed |
|---|---|---|---|---|---|---|---|---|---|---|---|---|
| Zhong Hanliang & Jackie | 5th^{1} | 5th | 3rd⊃ | 1stƒ | 2nd | 1st^ | 2nd⊃ | 1st^{11} | 1st | 2nd | 1st | Zhong Hanliang 7, Jackie 7 |
| Li Xiaopeng & Li Anqi | 2nd | 2nd | 1st | 2nd | 1st | 2nd~ | 1st⊃ | 2nd | 3rd> | 1st | 2nd | Li Xiaopeng 7, Li Anqi 7 |
| Bai Jugang & Guan Xiaotong | 8th | 8th^{2} | | | | | | | 2ndß | 3rd | 3rd | Bai Jugang 4, Guan Xiaotong 3 |
| Jin Dachuan & Liu Chang | 1st | 4th | 6th⊂ε^{4} | 4th | 3rd | 3rdθ< | 3rd⊃^{8} | 4th^{10} | 4th | 4th | | Jin Dachuan 8, Liu Chang 5 |
| Chen Xiaochun & Zheng Yijian | 4th | 1st^{2} | 2nd | 6th | 4th | 5thθ | 4th^{8} | 3rd^{9} | 5th<^{12} | | | Chen Xiaochun 5, Zheng Yijian 7 |
| Chen Yiru & Zhou Weitong | 3rd | 3rd | 5th | 5th^{5} | 5th^{6} | 4th^> | 5th⊂^{8} | 5th | | | | Chen Yiru 6, Zhou Weitong 5 |
| Zhang Tielin & Yueliang | 6th | 6th | 4thə^{3} | 3rd | 6th− | 6th~^{7} | | | | | | Zhang Tielin 3, Yueliang 5 |
| Ying Cai'er & Liu Yun | 7th | 7th | 7th | | | | | | | | | Ying Cai'er 3, Liu Yun 2 |

Key

- A red team placement means the team was eliminated.
- A green ƒ indicates that the team won a Fast Forward.
- A purple ε indicates that the team decided to use the first Express Pass on that leg. A magenta ə indicates the team had previously been given the second Express Pass and used it on that leg.
- A fuchsia ß indicates that a team was brought back into the competition by means of the Save won during the previous leg.
- An underlined blue team placement indicates that the team came in last on a non-elimination leg and had to perform a Speed Bump during the next leg.
- Matching colored symbols (pink ~, olive θ and teal ^) indicate teams who worked together during part of the leg as a result of an Intersection.
- An orange + indicates that there was a Versus on this leg, while an orange − indicates the team that lost the Versus and received a 15-minute penalty.
- A yellow > means that team chose to use the Yield; < indicates the team who received it.
- A brown ⊃ or a cyan ⋑ indicates that the team chose to use one of the two U-Turns in a Double U-Turn; ⊂ or ⋐ indicates the team who received it; ⋐⋑ around a leg number indicates that only one of the two available U-Turns was used.
- Italicized results indicate the position of the team at the midpoint of a two-part leg.

Notes

1. ^^{a} ^{b} Zhong Hanliang & Jackie were subject to various placement changes on the first leg:
  - They drove off from Luohu Stadium without their crew members, and were the 4th team to arrive at Hong Kong International Airport for the first of two flights to New York. They were given a penalty which caused them to depart last for the leg and leaving them to go on the second flight instead.
  - They were the 4th team to arrive at the Pit Stop, but were issued a 30-minute penalty for breaking traffic laws while driving to the Pit Stop. Chen Xiaochu & Zhen Yijian checked-in during their penalty time, dropping Zhong Hanliang & Jackie to 5th.
2. ^^{a} ^{b} Chen Xiaochu & Zhen Yijian initially arrived 1st, but they were issued a 30-minute penalty as Chen Xiaochun had performed both of the Roadblocks on the leg when they were instructed to alternate. This did not affect their placement. Bai Jugang & Guan Xiaotong were eligible to be penalized for the same infraction (Bai Jugang had also performed both Roadblocks for the leg), but they were the last team to arrive to the Pit Stop, resulting in their elimination.
3. Zhang Tielin & Yueliang used their Express Pass from Jin Dachuan & Liu Chang to bypass the task at the Eagle Films Studio on Leg 3.
4. Jin Dachuan & Liu Chang used their Express Pass to bypass the Detour in Leg 3. However they still had to do one side of the Detour since Zhong Hanliang & Jackie U-Turned them before they got to the board.
5. Chen Yiru & Zhou Weitong initially arrived 3rd, but were issued a 30-minute penalty as they moved more than five metres apart during the Detour, which was specifically prohibited by the rules. Zhang Tielin & Yueliang and Jin Dachuan & Liu Chang checked-in during their penalty time, dropping Chen Yiru & Zhou Weitong to 5th.
6. Chen Yiru & Zhou Weitong initially arrived 5th. However, they took a transportation vehicle to the Pit Stop when the clue instructed them to walk. They had to return to the Burj al-Arab and then walk to the Pit Stop. This did not affect their placement.
7. Zhang Tielin & Yueliang initially arrived 3rd. However, they received a 1-hour penalty for quitting the whitewater rafting challenge. The last three teams trailing them (Jin Dachuan & Liu Chang, Chen Yiru & Zhou Weitong and Chen Xiaochun & Zheng Yijian) checked-in during the penalty time, dropping them to last place and resulting in their elimination.
8. Jin Dachuan & Liu Chang, Chen Xiaochun & Zheng Yijian and Chen Yiru & Zhou Weitong were unable to complete the pottery challenge and were each issued a 15-minute penalty before they could continue racing.
9. Chen Xiaochun & Zheng Yijian exceeded the number of eggs delivered during the task, where they were supposed to deliver 120 eggs as stated in the clue, and were issued a 5-minute penalty at the site.
10. Jin Dachuan & Liu Chang broke an egg during the egg delivery challenge and were issued a 30-second penalty on the site.
11. Zhong Hanliang & Jackie delivered some eggs to help Chen Xiaochun & Zheng Yijian where it was prohibited per the clue. They also had lost eight eggs during the delivery (inclusive of two broken eggs), and were issued a 5-minute penalty at the site.
12. Chen Xiaochun & Zheng Yijian chose not to complete the octopus-eating challenge and received a 1-hour penalty before being permitted to continue.

=== Voting history ===
Similar to the Israeli, Australian and Philippine versions, teams on the seventh leg voted for who should receive the U-Turn. The team who has the most votes must complete the other option of the Detour they did not select.

| Leg #: | 7 |
|---|---|
| U-Turned: | Chen Yiru & Zhou Weitong; 3–1–1 |
| Voter | Team's vote |
| Zhong Hanliang & Jackie | Chen Yiru & Zhou Weitong |
| Li Xiaopeng & Li Anqi | Chen Yiru & Zhou Weitong |
| Jin Dachuan & Liu Chang | Chen Yiru & Zhou Weitong |
| Chen Xiaochun & Zheng Yijian | Li Xiaopeng & Li Anqi |
| Chen Yiru & Zhou Weitong | Zhong Hanliang & Jackie |

== Prizes ==
The prize for each leg is awarded to the first place team for that leg.

- Leg 1 – Two Express Passes^{1}
- Leg 3 – A year's supply of Satine Organic Milk and a personal driver and vehicle for the next leg.
- Leg 4 – An amount of local currency equivalent to CN¥2,000 for the next leg (approximately AED 1,200).
- Leg 5 – Trip to Jordan, Jerusalem, and the Dead Sea.
- Leg 7 – A year's supply of Satine Organic Milk and a GPS for use on the next leg.
- Leg 8 – A Save^{2}, a year's supply of Satine Organic Milk and a diamond ring for each team member.
- Leg 10 - One Infiniti Q50L for each racer, CN¥1,000,000 to donate for charity, and two trophies.
1. An item that can be used to skip any one task of the team's choosing. The winning team keeps one for themselves but must relinquish the second to another team before the end of the sixth leg.
2. An item that must be used to revive one of the teams that had been previously eliminated.

== Race summary ==
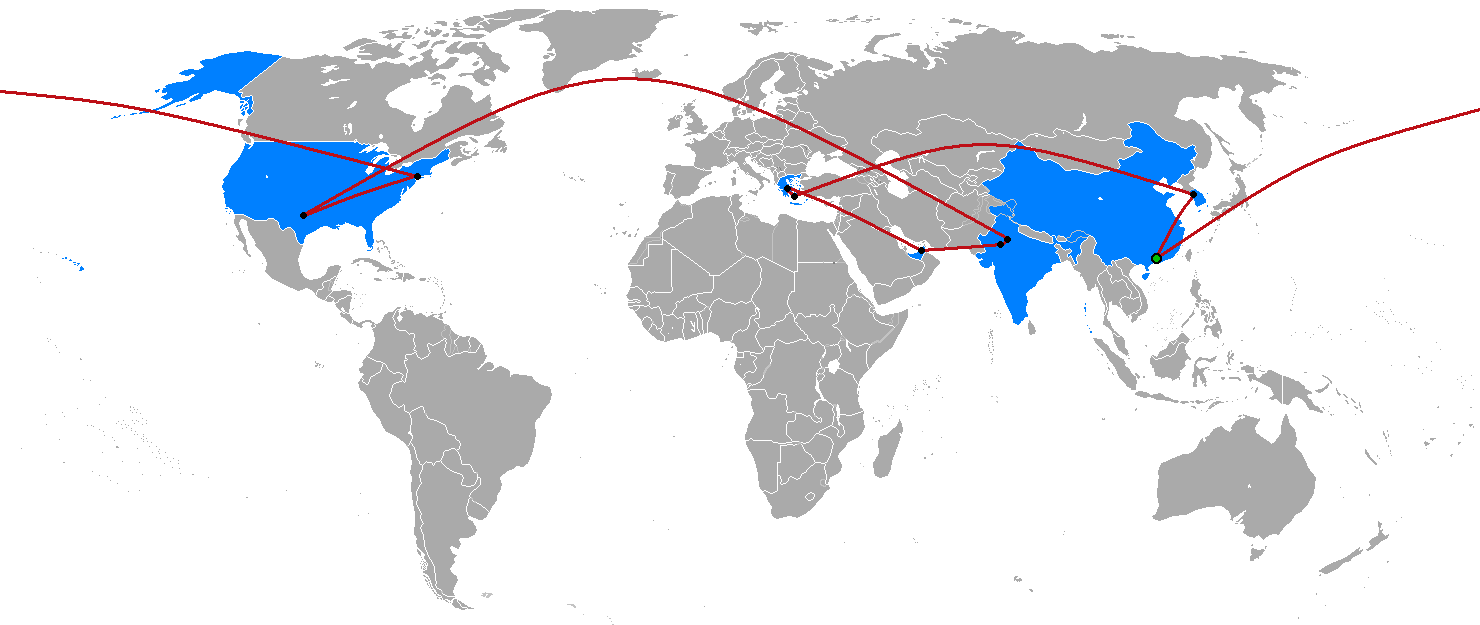
The complete route map of The Amazing Race: Jisu Qianjin. Green dot indicates the location of starting point, penultimate leg and final leg.

| Destinations | Air travel Rail travel Water travel Bus travel Helicopter travel Bicycle travel Gondola travel |
| Route Markers | 绕道 (Detour) 路障 (Roadblock) 快进 (Fast Forward) 对抗 (Versus) 让路 (Yield) 联合 (Intersection) 回转 (U-Turn) 减速带 (Speed Bump) 中继站 (Pit Stop) |

=== Leg 1 (China → Hong Kong → United States) ===
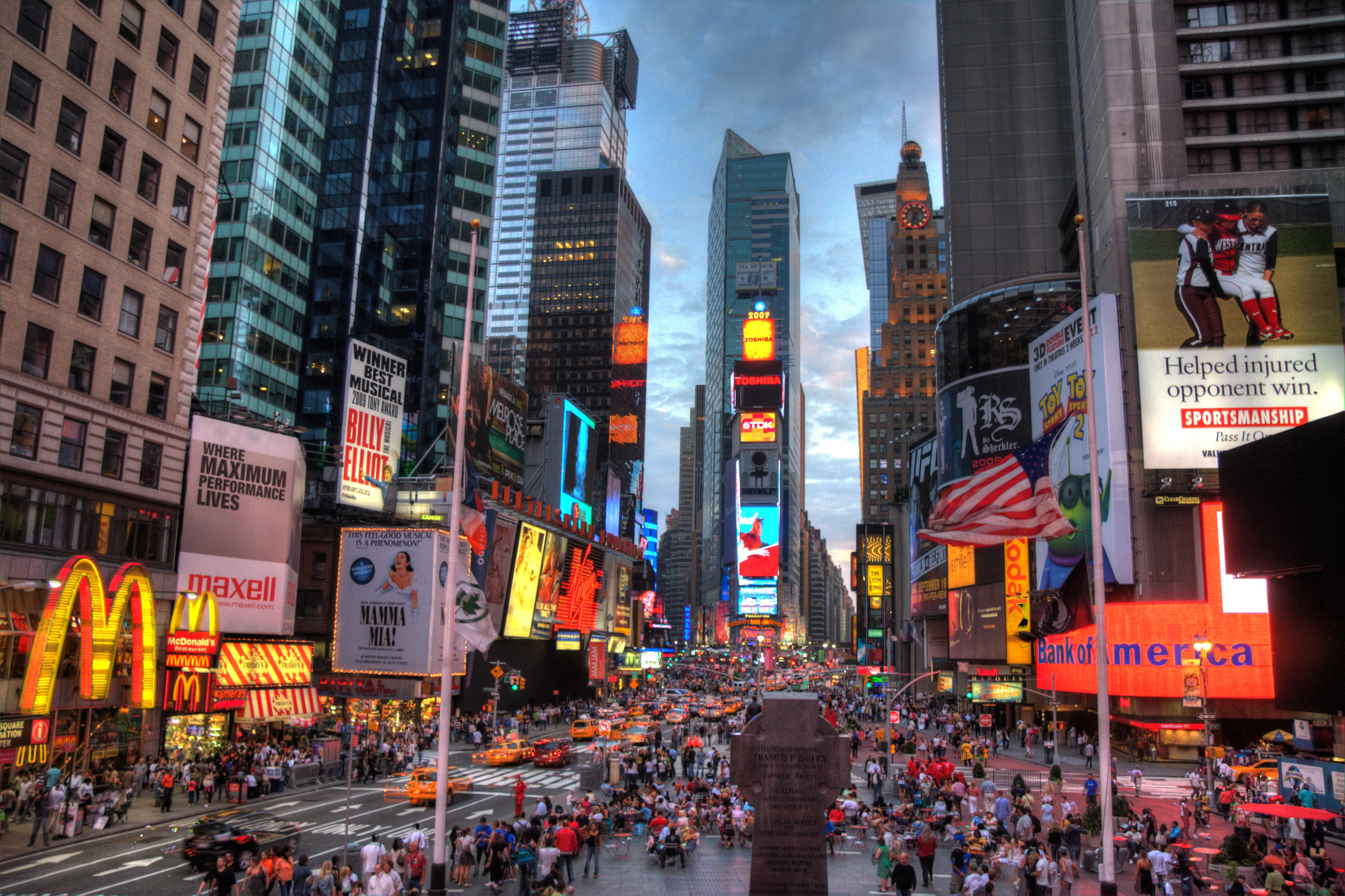
After arriving in New York City, teams searched for their next clue in Times Square.

Airdate: October 17, 2014

- Shenzhen, Guangdong (OCT East) (Starting Line)
- Shenzhen (Luohu Stadium)
- Hong Kong (Hong Kong International Airport) → New York City, United States (John F. Kennedy International Airport)
- New York City (Times Square)
- New York City (Theatre Circle)
- New York City (Grand Army Plaza)
- New York City (East River Park or Lombardi's Pizza)
- New York City (Tompkins Square Park)
- New York City (Hollywood Stunts NYC)
- New York City (Brooklyn Bridge Park)

In this series' first Roadblock, one team member had photograph themselves kissing three of the following kinds of people with a polaroid camera outside the Plaza Hotel – (1) a lady with white hair; (2) a person with a child in a stroller; (3) someone of the opposite gender wearing a wedding ring; (4) someone lying on the ground; (5) someone holding a briefcase – and exchange them with a photographer for their next clue.

This series' first Detour was a choice between 好身体 (Hǎo Shēntǐ – Good Body) or 好记性 (Hǎo Jìxìng – Good Memory). In Good Body, teams traveled to the East River Park and have to participate in American Football. Teams have to dress in football gear, then run through a series of tires without falling over, push past a gauntlet of football players, and then kick a football over a group of players. Once teams scored a goal, they could receive their next clue. In Good Memory, teams made their way to Lombardi's Pizza. Teams then chose a series of three pizza orders and had to memorise the addresses of three different locations and carry all three orders at once through the streets to deliver them in exchange for receipts. Once they got all three receipts, they could exchange those for the next clue.

In this leg's second Roadblock, one team member, regardless of who performed the previous Roadblock, was tied up into a straitjacket. After being hung upside-down at a height of four storeys, they had to free themselves before climbing to a platform and jumping onto a soft landing pad before receiving their next clue.

Additional tasks

- At OCT East, teams had to search among 50 balloons for one of a total of eight car keys attached to them. Once they got a key, teams have to pick up one of the Infiniti Q50 and would reveal their next destination played on the Infiniti's video screen: Luohu Stadium.
- At Luohu Stadium, teams have to search a taxi and a driver who would take teams to the Hong Kong airport, where teams would reserve one of two flights to New York, departing at 4:10 pm and 6:45 pm, respectively.
- At Times Square, teams have to look up through many electronic billboards for the one that would display their next location "Theatre Circle, 268 West 44th Street", flashing every three minutes.
- At Theatre Circle, teams would pick up a souvenir keychain with a number determining the order that they would enter the store starting at 9.00 am the following morning. There, teams searched the store for their next clue.
- At Tompkins Square Parks, teams had to search a red and yellow hot dog stall and eat four different kinds of hot dogs to receive their next clue from the vendor.

=== Leg 2 (United States) ===
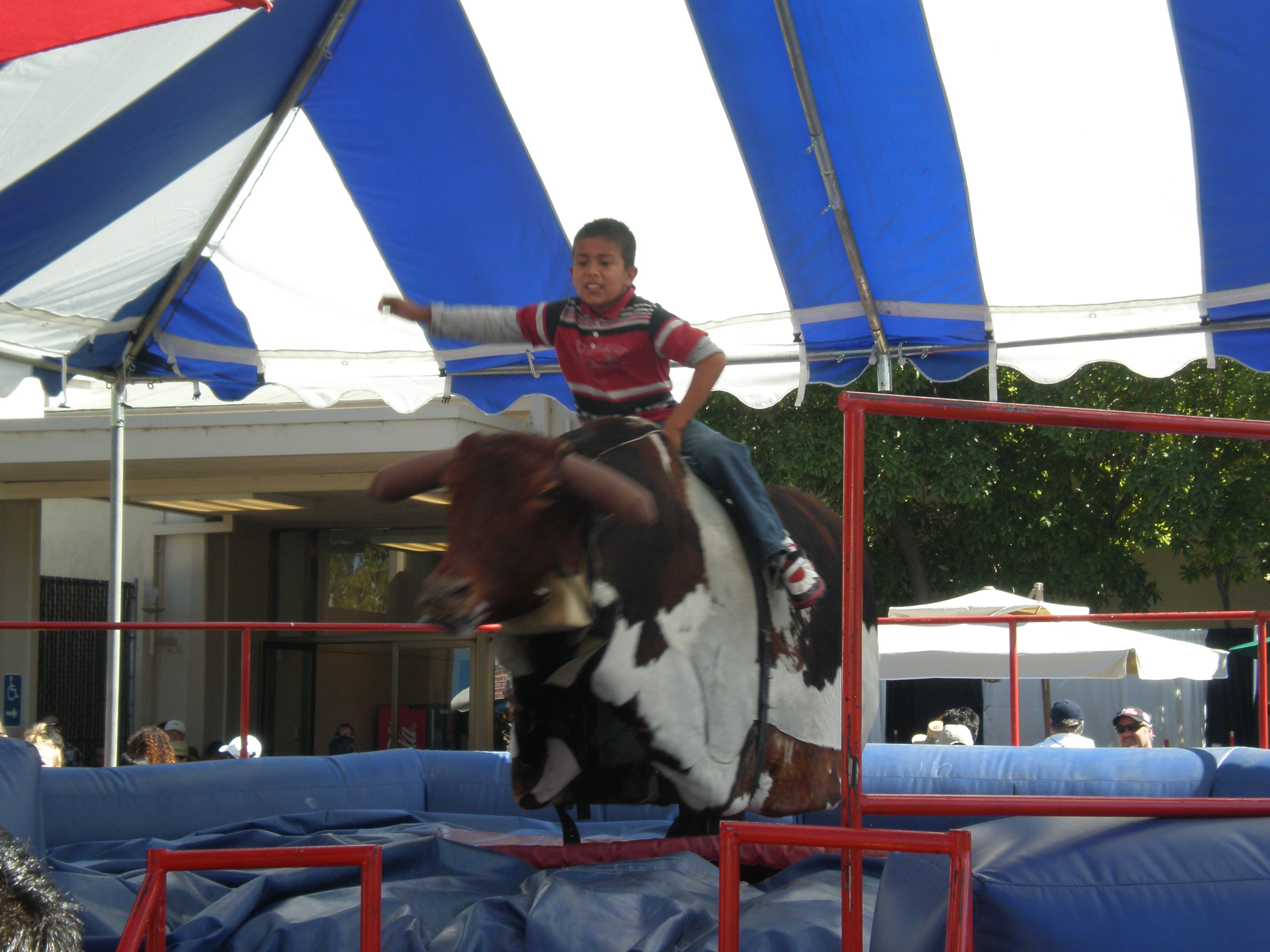
While in Texas, racers had to ride a mechanical bull in order to receive their next clue.

- Episode 2 (24 October 2014)
- Eliminated: Bai Jugang & Guan Xiaotong

Locations

- New York City (1 Lexington Avenue)
- New York City (John F. Kennedy International Airport) → Dallas (Dallas/Fort Worth International Airport)
- Fort Worth (Fort Worth Stockyards – Intersection of Exchange Avenue & Main Street)
- Fort Worth (Cross Eyed Moose Antiques or Billy Bob's Texas)
- Fort Worth (Fort Worth Stockyards – Water Tower)
  - Fort Worth (Fort Worth Stockyards – Cowtown Cattlepen Maze)
- Cleburne (Mainstay Farm)
- Grandview (Farm)
- Grandview (Beaumont Ranch)
- Grandview (Beaumont Ranch – Bell House)

Episode summary

- At the start of this leg, teams were instructed to fly to Dallas and then travel to the Fort Worth Stockyards for their next clue.
- This leg's Detour was a choice between Snap (咔嚓 – Kāchā) or Stomp (踢踏 – Tītà). In Snap, teams had to find eight antique photographs outside of Cross Eyed Moose Antiques. They had to memorize the details of one of these photographs and then dress up exactly as the subjects in the photograph before recreating the pose for a photographer. If the photograph was taken perfectly, teams would get their next clue; otherwise, teams had to completely remove their costumes before trying again. In Stomp, teams had to find Billy Bob's Texas, dress in cowboy attire and then learn and perform a line dance before receiving their next clue.
- After the Detour, teams had to find a water tower, where one team member had to ride a mechanical bull for 45 seconds without falling off before receiving their next clue.
- For their Speed Bump, Bai Jugang & Guan Xiaotong had to go into the giant maze to find the four letters that spell out "MAZE" before they could continue racing.
- In this leg's first Roadblock, one team member had to choose an armadillo, place it into the playing area of a field and then guide it towards a goal by blowing onto it or luring it with worms before receiving their next clue.
- After the first Roadblock, teams were brought to a farm in Grandview. There, teams have to roll over several hay bales until they found one that had their next clue beneath. Teams then had to travel to Beaumont Ranch.
- In this leg's second Roadblock, the team member who did not perform the previous Roadblock had to ride a zip line over the ranch and spot six pictures along the ground. They then had to choose the same pictures from a set of pictures and arrange them in chronological order (Kiss Print, Hot Dogs, Brooklyn Bridge, Mechanical Horse Rider, Armadillo and Hay Bales) before receiving their next clue.
- After the second Roadblock, teams were given a map of the ranch and a compass and had to navigate the grounds to find the Pit Stop at Bell House.

Additional note

- After this leg concluded, teams returned to China.

=== Leg 3 (India) ===
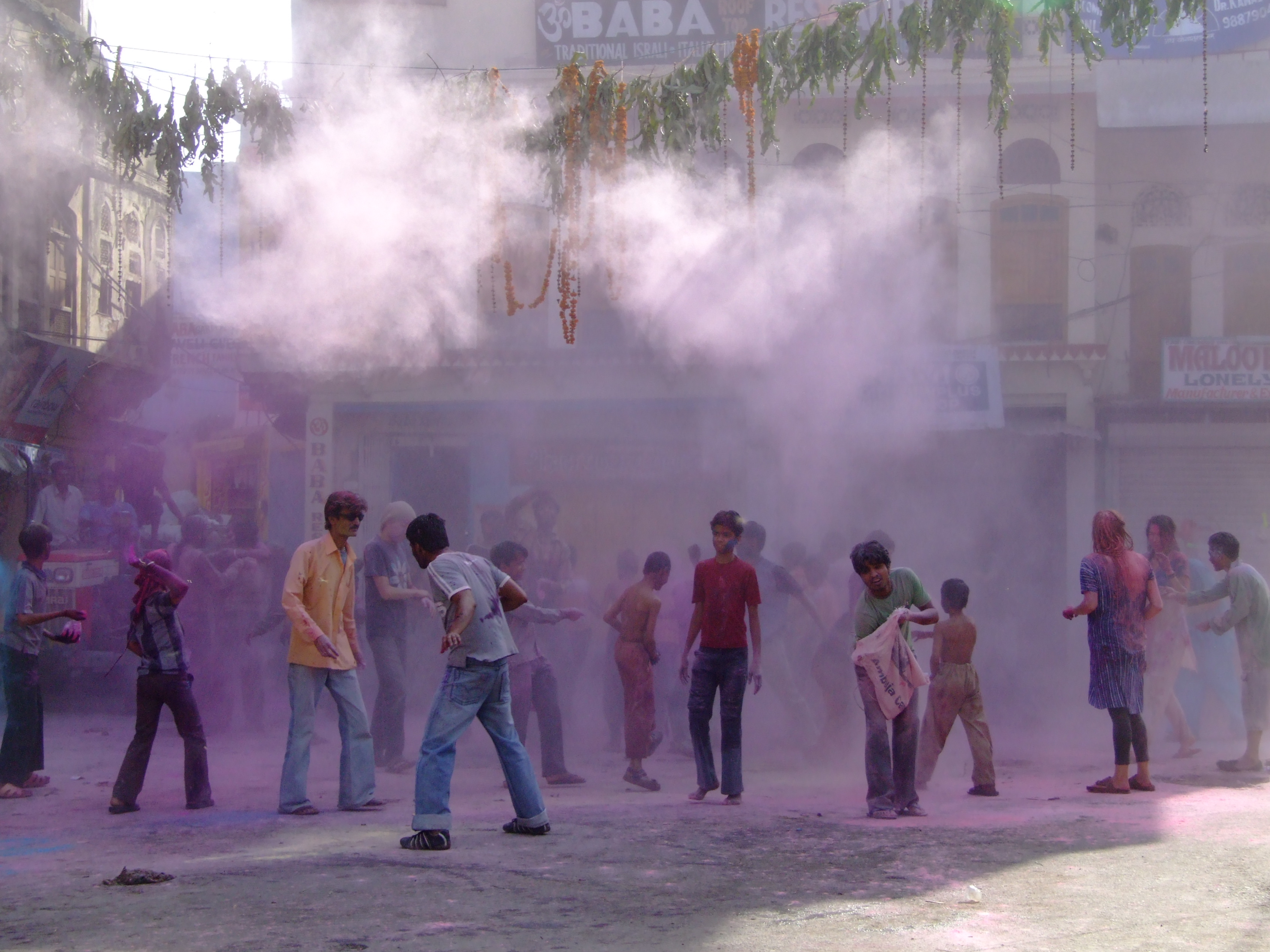
In the Roadblock in Delhi, racers had to search through a group of Holi festival goers.

Airdate: October 31, 2014

- Delhi, India (Hotel)
- Delhi (Qutb Minar)
- Delhi (Ghazipur Market)
- Noida (Eagle Films Studio)
- Delhi (New Friends Colony Community Market – Jitender Rajasthani Mehandi Wala)
- Delhi (Defence Colony Club Sport Complex)
- Delhi (Humayun's Tomb)

This leg's Detour was a choice between 鱼儿欢 (Yú Ér Huān – Happy Fish) or 花儿香 (Huā Er Xiāng – Sweet Flower). In Happy Fish, teams had to find market stall #25 and catch live fish and put them into a basket. They then had to transport this basket of fish to stall #63 while carrying it on their head. Once 25 fish were delivered, teams would receive their next clue. In Sweet Flower, teams had to recreate a traditional Indian flower garland using 178 flowers that matched an example to receive their next clue.

In this leg's Roadblock, one team member had to search a crowd of people for one of seven people that was assigned to their team, all while people were participating in a Holi celebration by throwing coloured dyes at each other and the racers, to receive their next clue.

Additional tasks

- At the start of the leg, teams were given a photograph of a green auto rickshaw and were told to travel by one to Qutb Minar. Along the way, teams had to learn the Hindi word for "hello" ("Namaste") and greet a woman there to receive their next clue.
- After finishing the Detour, teams had to search the grounds of the market to find the U-Turn board and their next clue.
- At Eagle Films Studio, teams had to learn and perform a Bollywood movie dance routine and recite dialog in Hindi to the satisfaction of the director to receive their next clue.
- At the New Friends Colony market, teams were given a henna tattoo and had to figure out that the next location was written on their hand in Sanskrit.

=== Leg 4 (India) ===
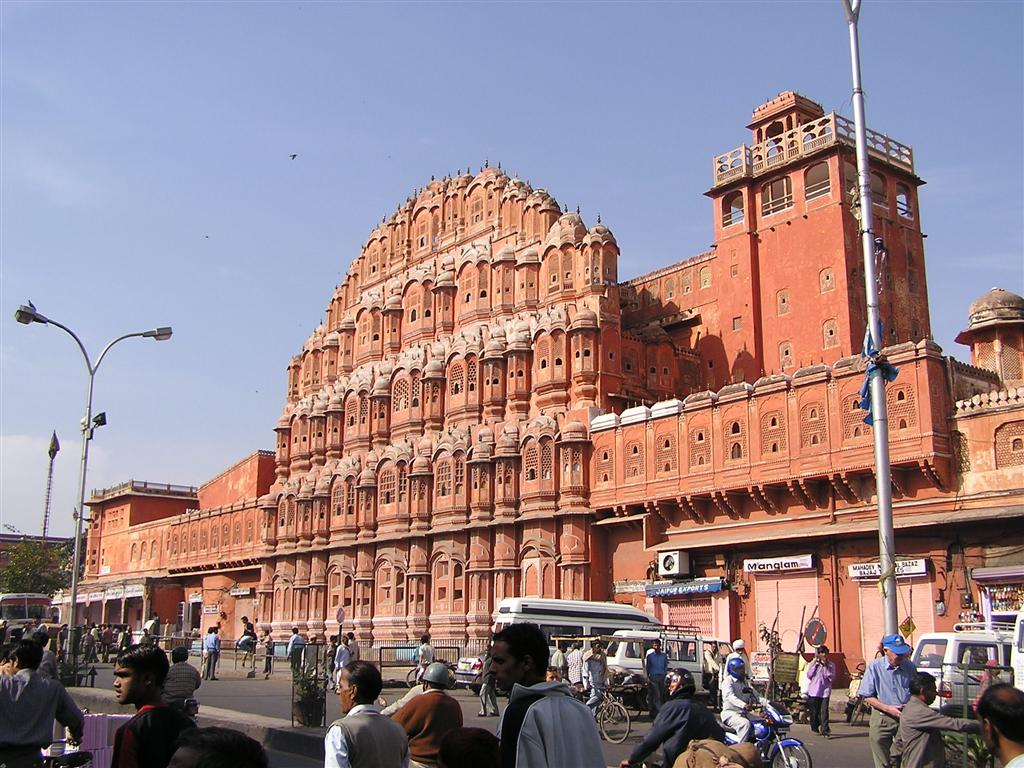
Teams visited Hawa Mahal while racing through Jaipur.

Airdate: November 7, 2014

- Delhi (Indira Gandhi International Airport) → Jaipur (Jaipur Airport)
- Jaipur (Jantar Mantar)
- Jaipur (Cricket Stadium)
  - Jaipur (Jaipur Neighbourhood)
- Jaipur (Chaugan Stadium)
- Jaipur (Jhamundas Girdhari Temple or Balaji Pottery)
- Jaipur (Hawa Mahal)
- Amber (Amber Fort)

In this leg's Roadblock, one team member had to hit at least one of six bowled cricket balls to receive their next clue. If racers were unable to hit any cricket balls, they had to relinquish their turn to other teams before they could try again.

In this season's only Fast Forward, teams traveled to a small neighbourhood where had to make 50 traditional dung cakes made of cow manure. The first team to complete the task would win the Fast Forward award.

This leg's Detour was a choice between 慢下来 (Màn Xià Lái – Slow Down) or 跑起来 (Páo Qǐ Lái – Hurry Up). In Slow Down, teams made their way to the Jhamundas Girdhari Temple and had to learn a series of five yoga poses. They then had to perform all five within two minutes, holding each one correctly for at least 10 seconds, to receive their next clue. In Run Up, teams made their way to Balaji Pottery where they would load pots onto a tricycle delivery device, and transport the pots onto only one tricycle to a specified address. Once teams managed to deliver at least 32 unbroken pots in one trip, they would receive the next clue; otherwise, they had to go back to Balaji Pottery and start over.

Additional tasks

- At Jantar Mantar, teams had to find from the 50 men wearing turbans for one of six that had their next clue hidden within their turban. If teams do not find one, teams have to rewrap the man's turban before they could continue searching.
- Teams who didn't choose the Fast Forward had to travel to the Chaugan Stadium, where they had to search for entrance for their next clue.
- At Hawa Mahal, teams had to search inside the fort for their next clue.
- At Amber Fort, teams had to search the grounds for the Pit Stop.

=== Leg 5 (United Arab Emirates) ===
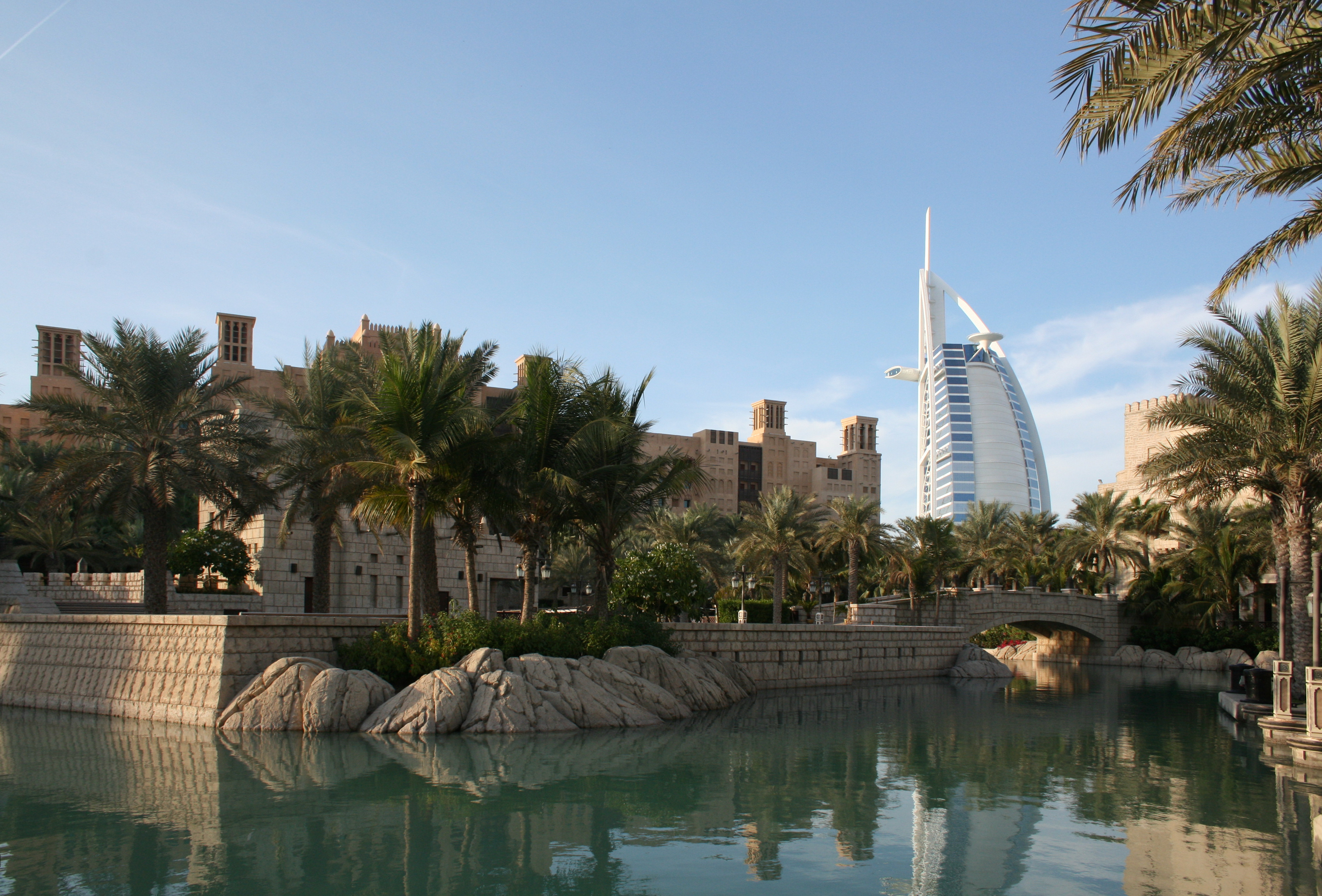
In Dubai, teams visited the Madinat Jumeirah and Burj Al Arab (background) for the last part of the leg.

Airdate: November 14, 2014

- Dubai, United Arab Emirates (Jumeirah Al Qasr)
- Dubai (Burj Khalifa)
- Dubai (Mall of the Emirates – Ski Dubai or Dubai Autodrome)
- Dubai (Dubai Polo & Equestrian Club)
- Margham (Skydive Dubai)
- Dubai (Burj Al Arab)
- Dubai (Madinat Jumeirah)

This leg's Detour choices were derived from the names of the popular films translated in Chinese, namely 冰雪奇缘 (Bīngxuě Qíyuán – Frozen) or 速度与激情 (Sùdù yǔ Jīqíng – Fast and Furious). In Frozen, teams made their way to Ski Dubai. They had to climb to the top of the ski hill, then alternating sliding a toboggan back down into a set of ten snowman-style bowling pins. Once they either score a strike, or both members scored a spare, they could receive the next clue. In Fast and Furious, teams made their way to the Dubai Autodrome and drove an Infiniti Q50 around a course. They had to drive through a slalom of cones and then park in a designated space within 48-seconds, all without hitting any obstacles, to receive their next clue.

For this series' first Versus, teams had to dress in either red or green polo attire and ride in camels to take part in camel polo. The first team to score three points would receive the next clue, while the losing team have to wait for another team before they could try again; the last team remaining had to wait for 15 minutes before they could continue racing.

For their Speed Bump, Chen Xiaochun & Zheng Yijian had to paint a traditional Arabian face painting on each other before they could continue racing.

In this leg's Roadblock, one team member had to tandem skydive with an instructor out of a plane 4,000 metres (13,000 ft) above the ground. Once they reunited with the other team member, they would receive their next clue.

Additional tasks

- At Burj Khalifa, teams had to search among four different kinds of plants on the first floor (erect prickly pear, spider lily, American aloe, bird of paradise), identify the plant which was the inspiration for the building's design, bring the pot up to the highest floor and give it to the judge. If teams gave the correct plant (spider lily), they would receive their next clue; otherwise, they had to go back down and pick another plant.
- At Burj Al Arab, teams had to clean up a hotel room, using a model room as a reference, to the hotel's standards in order to receive their next clue.

=== Leg 6 (United Arab Emirates) ===
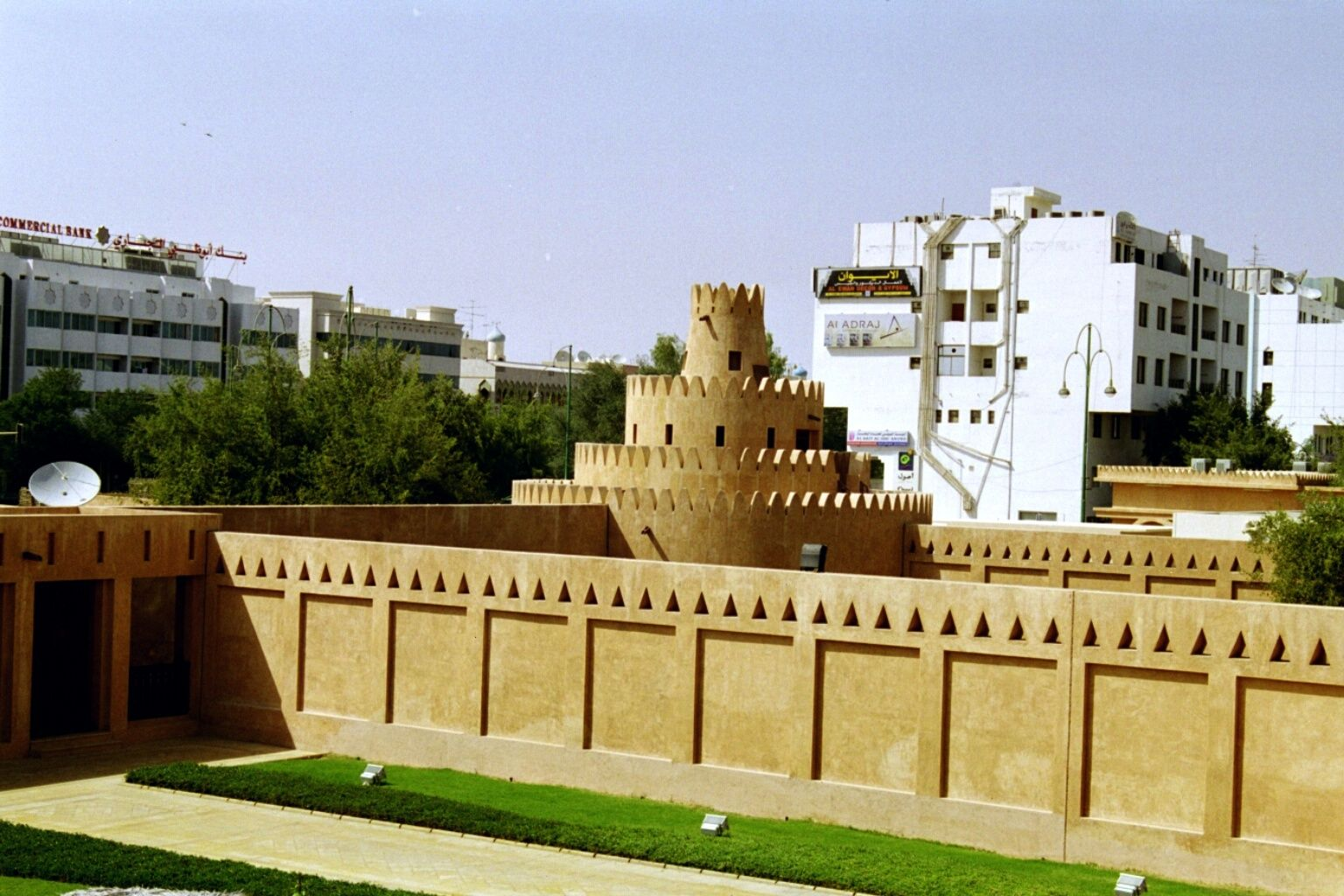
Al Ain was visited in this leg, which paid tribute to the Middle Eastern folk tale Aladdin.

Airdate: November 21, 2014

- Abu Dhabi (Sharjah Aristocratic Villa)
- Al Khatim (Arabian Nights Village)
- Al Khatim (Al Khatim Desert)
- Al Khatim (Arabian Nights Village)
- Al Ain (Wadi Adventure)
- Al Ain (Al Jahili Fort)

For their Speed Bump, Zhang Yueliang & Tielin had to go to the tiger pool and scoop all the plastic balls using the tools provided before they could continue racing.

This leg's Detour was a choice between 火眼金睛 (Huǒyǎn Jīnjīng – Sharp Eyes) or 满眼金星 (Mǎnyǎn Jīnxīng – Seeing Stars). In Sharp Eyes, teams had to choose a board which had pictures of the eyes of five different Arabian women. Then, teams would be tied together by wristbands before they were allowed to go to the villa to search among 15 women to identify the five pictured and receive their next clue. In Seeing Stars, teams had to don dancing attire and spin continuously for 30 seconds. Then, teams had to stack eight clay vases on top of one another within 30 seconds to receive their next clue; otherwise, they had to start over from the dance and try again.

In this leg's Roadblock, one team member had to use a meter detector to search a marked area in the sand for Aladdin's lamp, which they had to retain for the rest of the leg, to receive their next clue.

Additional tasks

- At the start of the leg, teams had to perform a "tiger kiss" (touching their nose to a local adolescent tiger) to receive their first clue.
- At the Arabian Nights Village, teams rode a camel into the bare sand dunes to search for their next clue.
- After completing the Roadblock, teams had to following directions to go back to the village. There, teams encountered an Intersection, where two teams had to erect a traditional Bedouin tent and prepare the interior properly to receive their next clue. After finishing the task, they were no longer Intersected.
- At Wadi Adventure, teams had to ride a raft down at the artificial rapids in the park while grabbing all three coloured flags (red, yellow and blue) hanging above to receive their next clue. Only two teams were allowed in the pool, and each team were given three attempts to complete; if they were unable to complete the task, they had to relinquish the spot to other teams before they could start over.

=== Leg 7 (Greece) ===
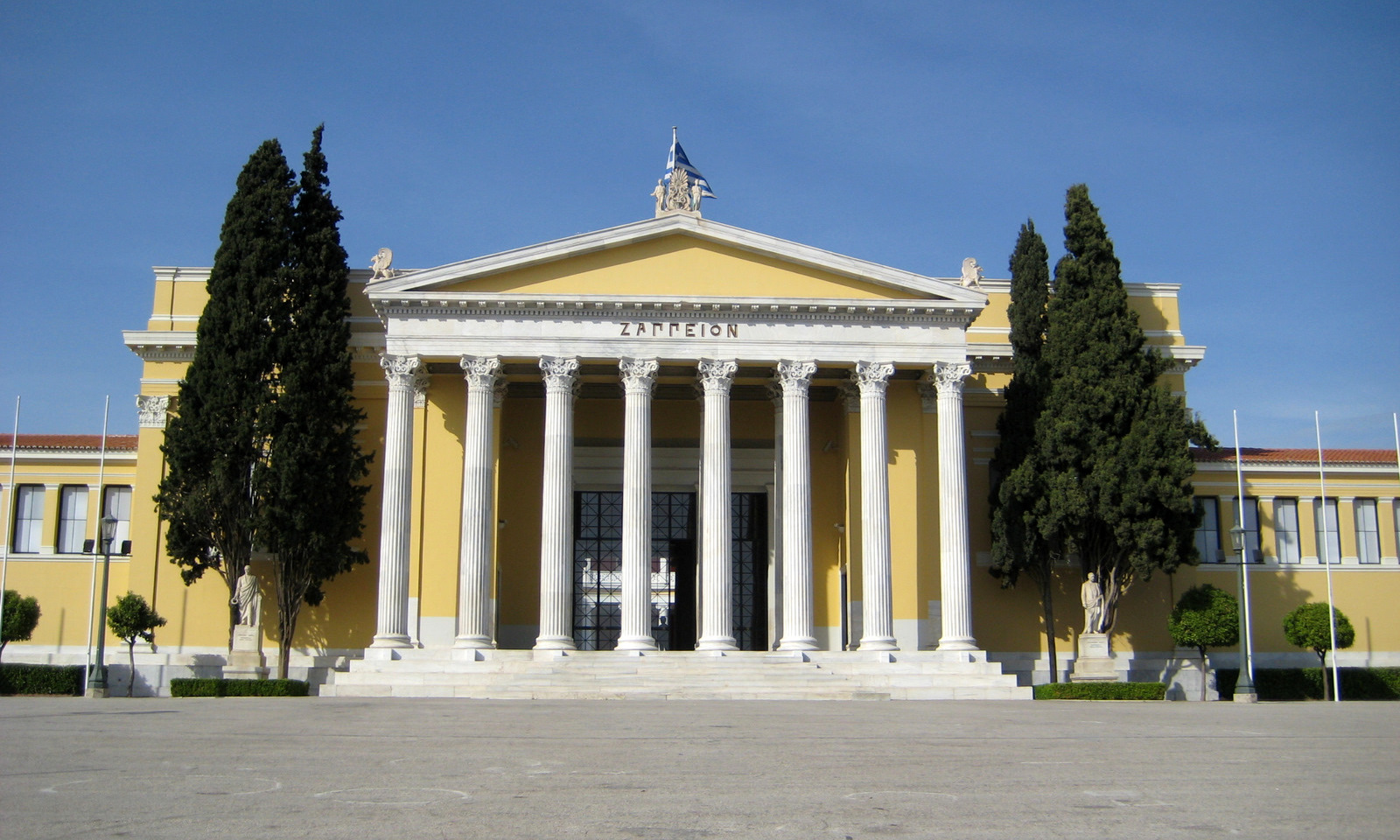
In Athens, teams visited Zappeion for this leg.

Airdate: November 28, 2014

- Athens, Greece (Athens Ledra Hotel)
- Athens (Athens Antiques Market)
- Athens (Zappeion)
- Athens (National Library of Greece or Poulaki Michail Park)
- Athens (Roman Agora)
- Athens (Archeon Gefsis)
- Athens (Panathenaic Stadium)
- Athens (Olympieion)

This leg's Detour was a choice between 智慧 (Zhìhuì – Wisdom) or 勇气 (Yǒngqì – Courage). In Wisdom, teams would have 30 seconds to memorize the Archimedes' law written in Mandarin Chinese. They then had to correctly recite the law to an Archimedes impersonator within 20 seconds to receive their next clue. In Courage, teams had to use a slingshot to launch watermelons towards a suit of armour standing 15 metres (49 ft) away. For each round, teams would launch ten watermelons and had five rounds to knock the armour over and receive the next clue. If teams were unable to knock the armour within five rounds, they would have to do the Wisdom task.

In this leg's Roadblock, one team member had to walk through an Ancient Greek dinner party. Afterwards, the racer had to correctly answer a question randomly chosen by the team member who did not participate in the Roadblock to receive their next clue.

Additional tasks

- At the Antiques Market, teams had to operate a spinning wheel to shape a clay basin to the satisfaction of the potter to receive their next clue. If teams were unable to shape the clay basin to the potter's satisfaction after six attempts, they had to serve a 15-minute penalty before they could continue racing.
- At Zappeion, teams had to observe a series of living statues representing ancient Greek gods and goddesses (Athena, Apollo, Poseidon and Zeus), put up objects from a selection of props onto the corresponding statues (Zeus: Lightning Bolt, Poseidon: Trident, Apollo: Harp, Athena: Spear and Shield), and say "Please Come to Life" in Greek. Once teams placed the objects onto the correct statues, the statues would come to life to give teams their next clue.
- At the Panathenaic Stadium, teams had to run three kilometres (1.9 mi) around the track to receive their next clue.

=== Leg 8 (Greece) ===
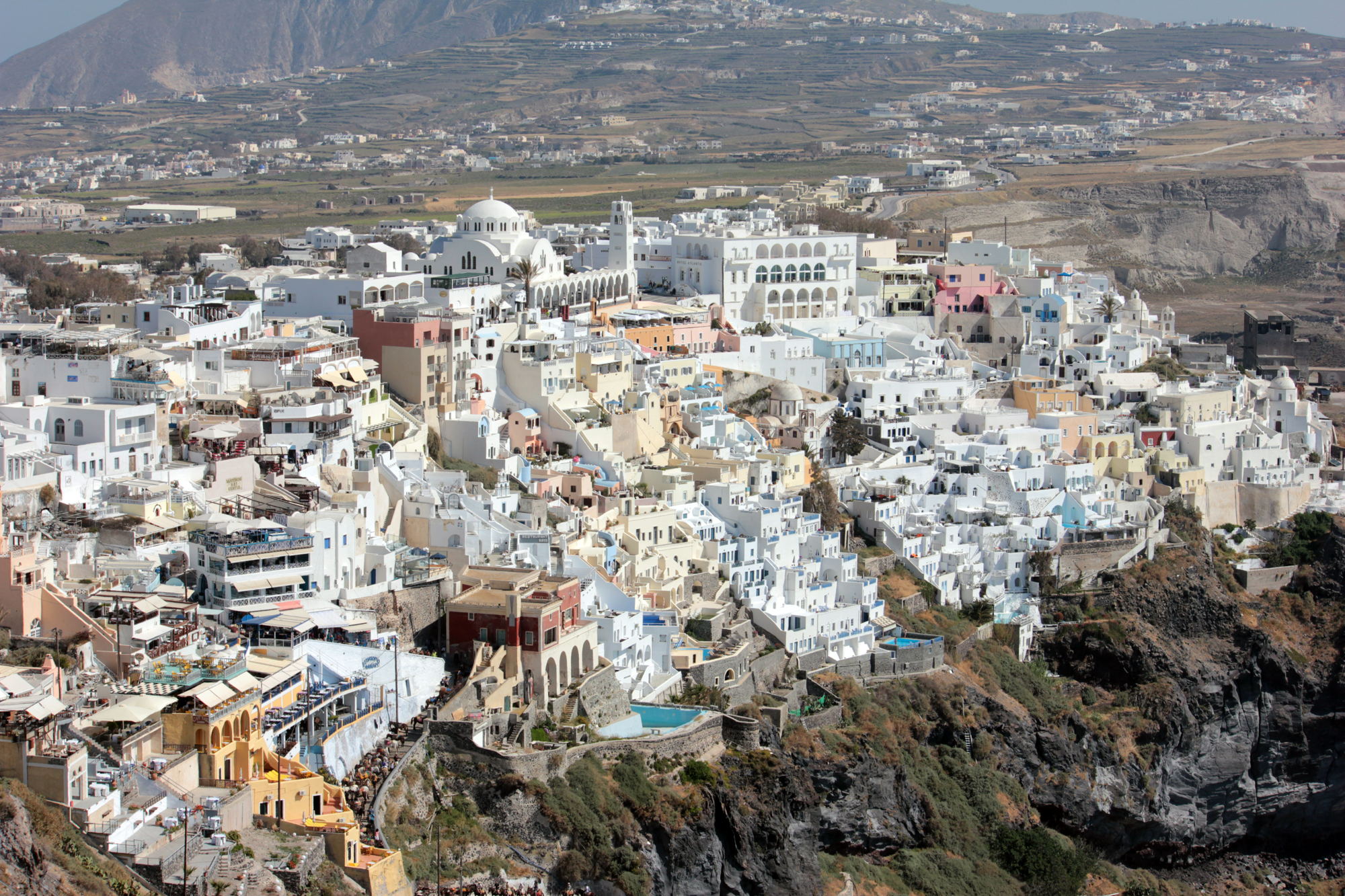
The eighth leg took place on the Greek island of Santorini, including the town of Fira.

Airdate: December 5, 2014

- Athens (Athens International Airport) → Kamari (Santorini National Airport)
- Oia (Oia Church)
- Fira (Ellis Restaurant)
- Fira (Porto Carra Cafe)
- Perissa (Perissa Beach)
- Perissa (Demilmar Restaurant)
- Akrotiri (Remezzo Tavern)
- Fira (Old Port)
- Amoudi (Amoudi Bay Dock)

For their Speed Bump, Chen Yiru & Zhou Weitong both had to chop one kilogram (2.2 lb) of onions before they could continue racing.

In this leg's first Roadblock, one team member had to rock climb up a sheer cliff face on Perissa Beach to reach an Amazing Race flag that they could trade for their next clue on the ground.

This leg's Detour was a choice between 爱情海 (Àiqíng Hǎi – Aegean Sea) or 忘情水 (Wàngqíng Shuǐ – Love Potion). In Aegean Sea, one team member had to fill a bucket with water from the Aegean Sea, stand in a designated area and toss the water to their partner, who was holding another bucket and had to pour the collected water into a container until it was full to receive their next clue. In Love Potion, teams had to stack seven cocktail glasses into a two-tier pyramid and then use a stack of mixing glasses to pour red and yellow cocktails into each glass simultaneously without mixing colors to receive their next clue.

In this leg's second Roadblock, one team member, regardless of who performed the previous Roadblock, had to retrieve a key from a net, don scuba gear and dive down eight metres (26 ft) to a shipwreck, where they had to search among several treasure chests for one that they could unlock to retrieve their next clue.

Additional tasks

- At Santorini National Airport, teams were given a photograph depicting a church roof and had to figure out that their next clue was at Oia Church.
- At Ellis Restaurant, teams had to choose a donkey, pack exactly 120 eggs into two baskets and deliver them to Porto Carra Cafe to receive their next clue. Teams would serve a 30-second penalty per every broken egg.
- At Old Port, teams had to choose an Infiniti car and a driver, who would drive them to the Pit Stop.

=== Leg 9 (South Korea) ===
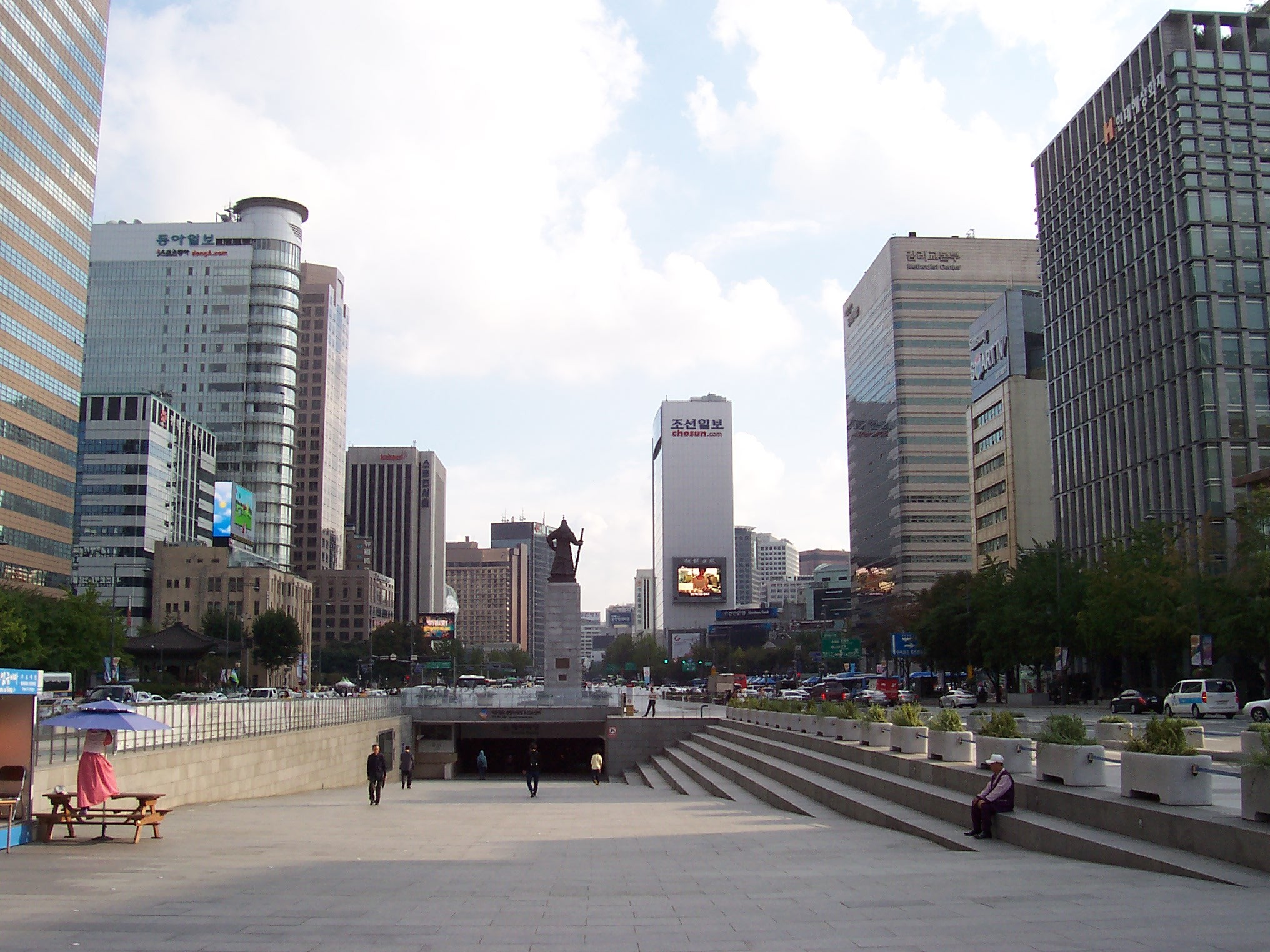
In Seoul, teams visited the famous Gwanghwamun Plaza and convince to help a giant jumprope with the locals.

Airdate: December 12, 2014

- Seoul, South Korea (Gyeonghuigung)
- Seoul (Namsan – Namsangol Hanok Village)
- Seoul (Noryangjin Fish Market)
- Seoul (Gwanghwamun Plaza)
- Seoul (Kyung Hee University)
- Seoul (World Cup Park – Haneul Park)

This season's final Detour was a choice between 出的厅堂 (Chūdetīngtáng – Outer Hall) or 下得厨房 (Xiàdéchúfáng – Inner Kitchen). In Outer Hall, teams had to learn a traditional Korean folk dance involving pots. This would involve intricate moves as well as balancing the pots on their heads. Once the dance was to the choreographer's satisfaction, they would receive their next clue. In Inner Kitchen, teams would observe and memorise a table laid out with 30 different Korean dishes. They then had to enter a different area with large pots full of the different foods and properly set a table so that it was identical to the given example. If all the 30 dishes were correctly placed, teams would receive their next clue; if not, the table would be cleared out and teams would have to start over.

In this leg's Roadblock, which took place at Kyung Hee University, one team member had to pick up to pick up a rose from the entrance, and then search the grounds of the school for Miss Korea 2014, Kim Seo-yeon, who would be pictured at the entryway. Teams had to give the rose to this woman, amongst many similarly dressed women. If they handed the rose over to the correct woman, teams would receive their next clue.

Additional tasks

- At the start of the leg at Gyeonghuigung, teams wrote a message on a scroll before they could travel to Namsangol Hanok Village for the next clue.
- At the Noryangjin Fish Market, teams have to catch five small octopuses from a tank at stall #142 and carry them by hand to the Busan Ilbeonji Shop. There, teams were given a simple instruction: "Eat Them", and teams have to each the octopuses they caught to receive the next clue.

=== Leg 10 (South Korea → Hong Kong → China) ===
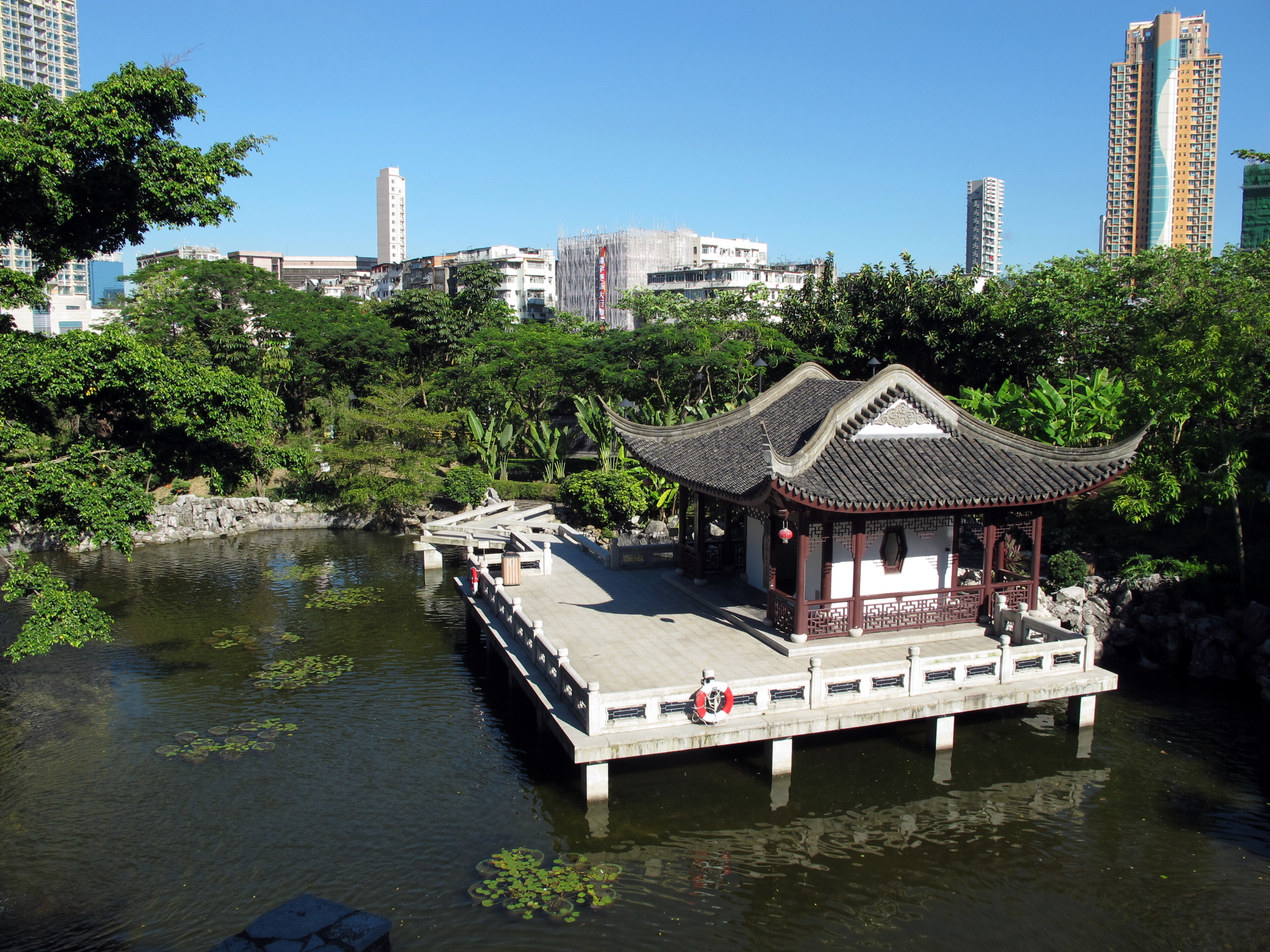
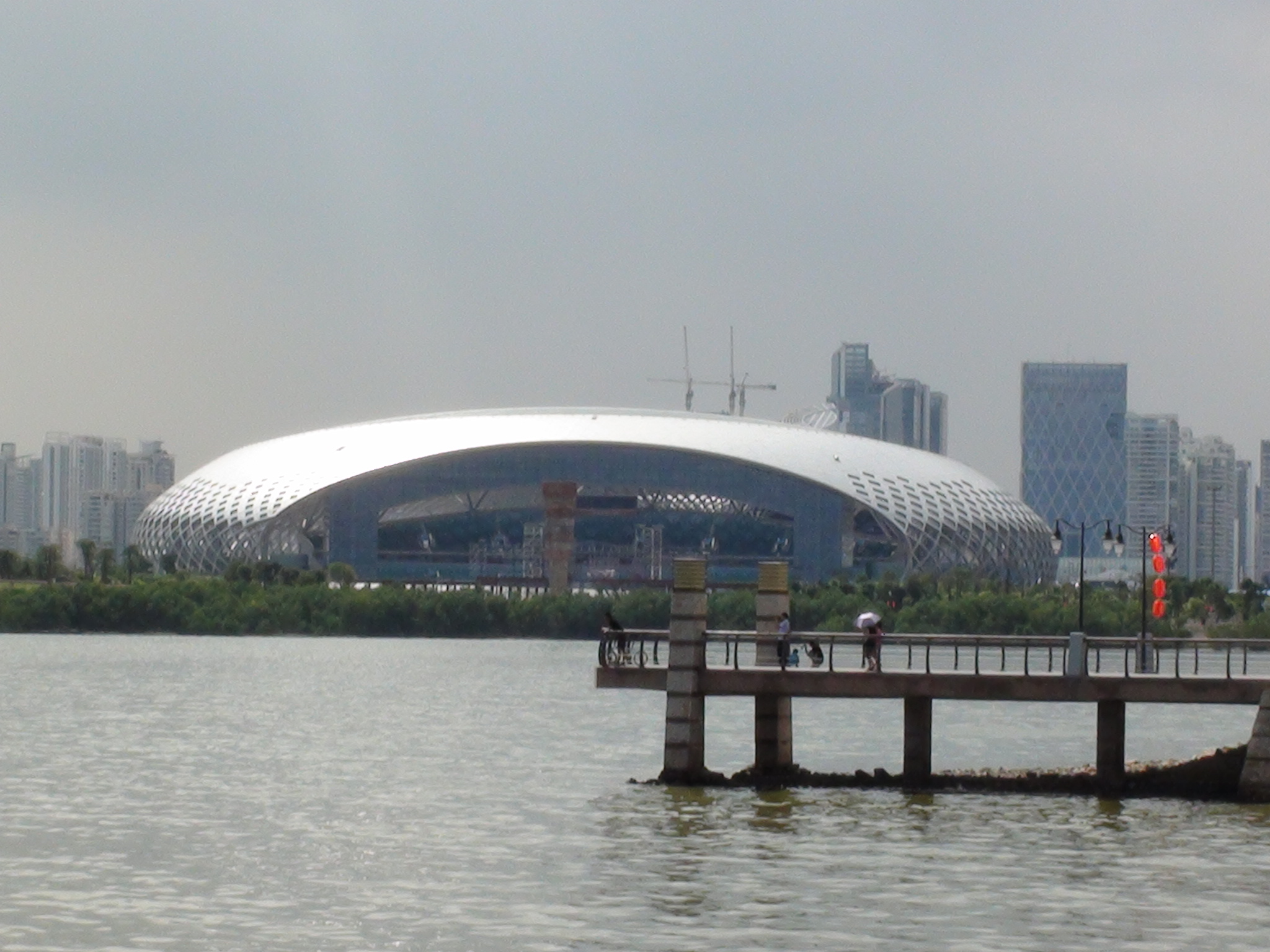
Teams visited Kowloon Walled City Park in Hong Kong where they had to find the warriors to identify with history, and Shenzhen Bay Sports Center in Shenzhen was the Finish Line of The Amazing Race.

Airdate: December 19, 2014

- Seoul (Incheon International Airport) → Hong Kong (Hong Kong International Airport)
- Hong Kong (Kowloon Walled City Park)
- Hong Kong (Aberdeen Harbour – Jumbo Floating Restaurant)
- Hong Kong (Golden Bauhinia Square) (Elimination Point)
- Shenzhen, Guangdong (University Town of Shenzhen)
- Shenzhen (Excellence Century Center)
- Shenzhen (Dashahe Park)
- Shenzhen (Shenzhen Bay Sports Center)

In this leg's first Roadblock, one team member had to don an ancient costume and walk across the square to interact with the ten figures. Afterwards, they must make their way to the throne and have to correctly identify all ten names they recalled within the given 90 seconds. Once they correctly identified the names of all the ancient figures, the Emperor (portrayed by former racer Zhang Tielin) would give teams their next clue.

In this season's final Roadblock, the team member who did not perform the previous Roadblock in Hong Kong had to rappel face-first down the exterior of the Excellence Century Centre to retrieve the next clue.

Additional tasks

- At the Jumbo Kingdom restaurant, teams had to use their eyes to search among 70 different plates of food set out on a table for one of a few fake food normally used for display to receive their next clue. Any real food picked up had to be eaten.
- From the virtual Pit Stop, teams were required to find their rest place after arriving at Shenzhen.
- At University Town of Shenzhen, teams have to move the cars forward and backwards only in order to clear a path for one of the three marked cars to exit the maze. They can use the car for means of transportation for the final leg.
- At Dashahe Park, teams had to enter a giant ball pit to find globes marked with the various countries they had visited during the Race. Only one team member was allowed in the pit at one time, and they have to pass the globes to their partner, who would place the globes into the corresponding podiums. Once all six globes were placed onto the correct podiums, a giant globe would open, where teams would get their final clue.

== Ratings ==
The data is determined by CSM.

CSM50 Rating

| Episode | Episode Date | Rating | Audience Share | National ranking (Note: Shows of CCTV were excluded from the ranking.) |
|---|---|---|---|---|
| 1 | 17 October 2014 | 0.914 | 3.07% | 5 |
| 2 | 24 October 2014 | 0.822 | 2.86% | 6 |
| 3 | 31 October 2014 | 1.054 | 3.34% | 5 |
| 4 | 7 November 2014 | 0.922 | 3.81% | 6 |
| 5 | 14 November 2014 | 1.098 | 3.51% | 4 |
| 6 | 21 November 2014 | 0.853 | 2.72% | 6 |
| 7 | 28 November 2014 | 1.042 | 3.27% | 5 |
| 8 | 5 December 2014 | 0.789 | 2.49% | 6 |
| 9 | 12 December 2014 | 1.137 | 3.54% | 3 |
| 10 | 19 December 2014 | 1.397 | 4.74% | 3 |
