= Pax Congo =

Chinese singer and songwriter

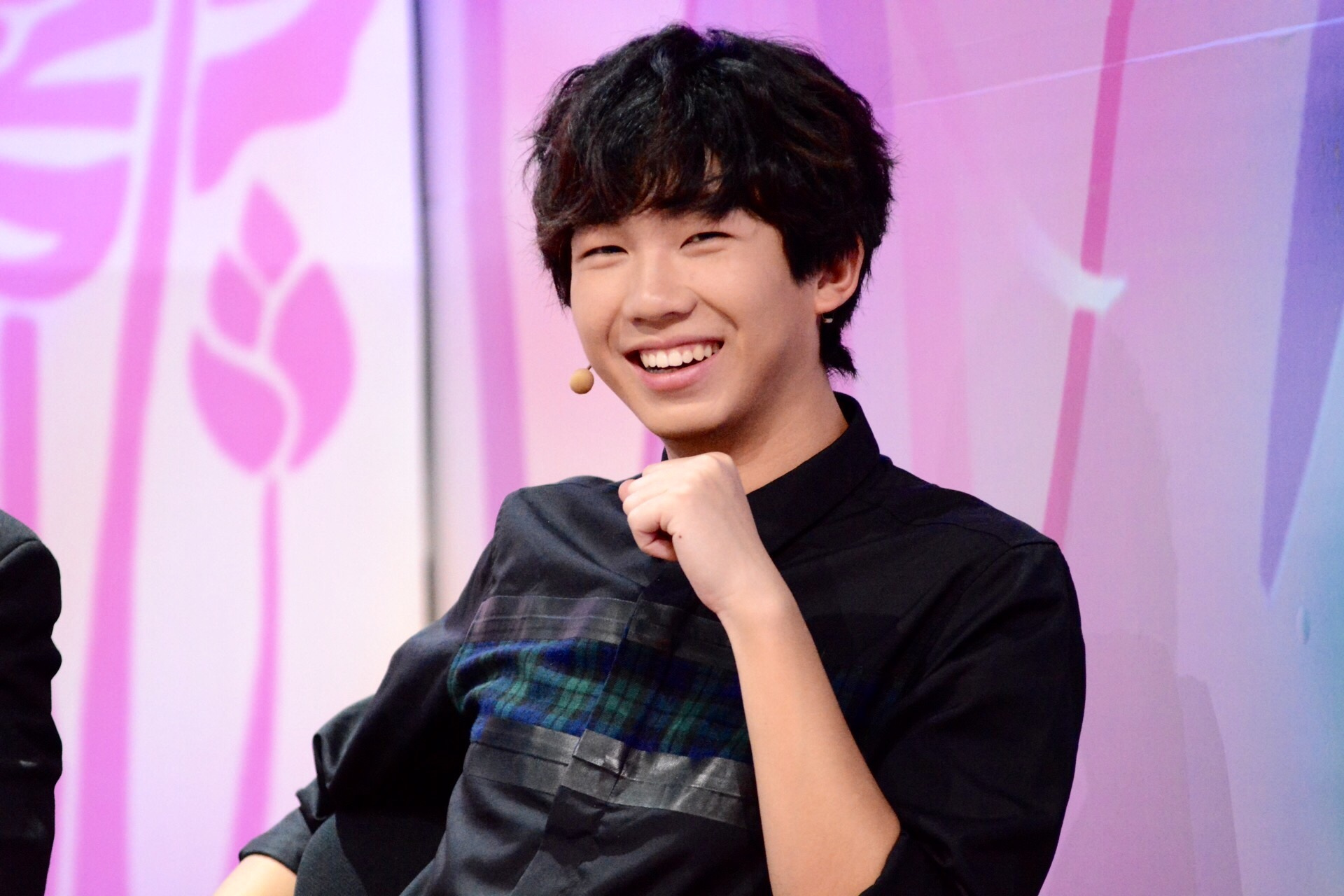
- Born: Bai Jugang; 9 November 1993 (age 33); Jiangyou, Sichuan, China
- Occupation: Singer
- Years active: 2013–present

Chinese name
- Simplified Chinese: 白举纲
- Traditional Chinese: 白舉綱
Transcriptions
Standard Mandarin
- Hanyu Pinyin: Bái Jǔgāng

Bai Jugang (Chinese: 白举纲; born 9 November 1993), also known as Pax Congo, is a Chinese singer/songwriter, known for his participation on reality television competitions.

== Career ==
In 2013, Bai was admitted to the undergraduate class of music performance in Sichuan Normal University. He then entered the entertainment industry as a contestant on Hunan Satellite TV's "Happy Boys", placing third nationally with the original song "Going Home on a Broken Ship". He signed with Tianyu media to release the song as part of a solo debut. Shortly after, he published a photo album entitled "PAX'S ATTITUDE".

In July 2015, he released his first full album "Young Bai" and hold his first solo concert.

He would continue his participation with competitive reality television by joining The Amazing Race 1 (China) in 2014.

In 2016, he released his second album "Wild Grass" and participated in Shenzhen Satellite TV's "Shiny Dad Season 2" in the same year.

In the summer of 2018, participated in the reality show "Chinese Restaurant 2", gaining notoriety from his presentation of Sichuan cuisine throughout the season. That September, he would feature in the comedy "Born to Be Wild: The Graduation Trip", playing Bo Xiong (his first starring role in a film).

After the conclusion of the show, he released "Ear Blindness", his third album under Tianyu Media. The album was recorded in Los Angeles with American Alt-Rock producer Erik Ron. He embarked on a six-city national tour to promote the 12-track album, while also participating in music festivals. From that album and tour, he would win the Q China 2018 Music Festival Best Rock Singer of the Year Award.

In 2019, he participated in the iQiyi Chinese Singer-composer Ecological Challenge Program "I am a singer-songwriter", performing a total of 7 original songs in 7 programs, and was part of the winning team.

In the spring of 2020, as a surprise singer, participate in "Singer·The Year of the Fight".

In 2021, he joined the cast of Call Me By Fire where he gained acclaim for his collaboration with Max Zhang and Kido Gao and joined the final winning team.

=== Variety shows ===
Year	Title	Chinese title	Role	Notes
2023	Natural High	现在就出发	Cast Member	

== Discography ==
Title	Chinese Title	Release Date
Young Bai	《少年白》	2015-06-18
Wild Grass	《野草》	2016-11-09
Ear blindness	《耳盲》	2018-07-18
