= Castle of Akrotiri =

Castle ruins in Santorini, Greece

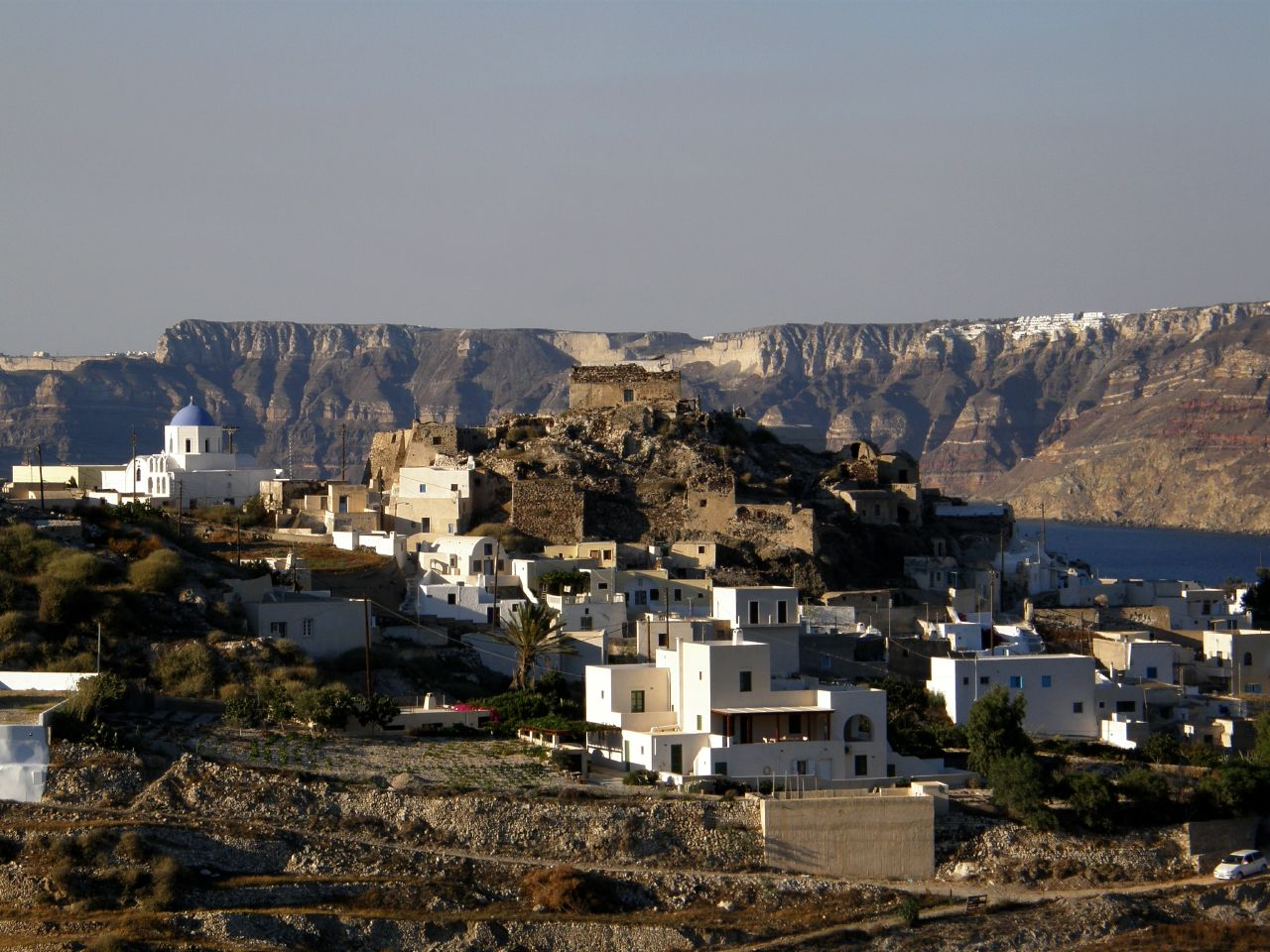
- The ruins of Akrotiri Castle dominate the modern day village of Akrotiri
- Interactive map of Castle of Akrotiri
- 36.3582°N 25.3972°E
- Type: Castle
- Cultures: Venetian
- Location: Akrotiri, Santorini, Greece
- Region: Aegean islands

The Castle of Akrotiri, also known as Castle Akrotiri, Goulas or La Ponta, is a former Venetian castle on the Greek island of Santorini. The now-ruined castle lies at the center of the village of Akrotiri.

== History ==
The castle was built in the 13th century by the Republic of Venice, which had occupied Santorini in 1207. Eager to fortify the island, the Venetians constructed a number of fortresses and watchtowers at key points around the island. Near the small hillside village of Akrotiri, Venetians engineers constructed a new castle on top of an existing Byzantine watchtower; this castle became one of the most defensible positions on the island. The fortress remained unconquered throughout the first of the Ottoman-Venetian Wars before finally surrendering to the Ottomans in 1617. The castle remained in relatively good condition until it was reduced to a ruin by an earthquake in 1956.
