= Akrotiri Lighthouse =

Lighthouse in Santorini, Greece

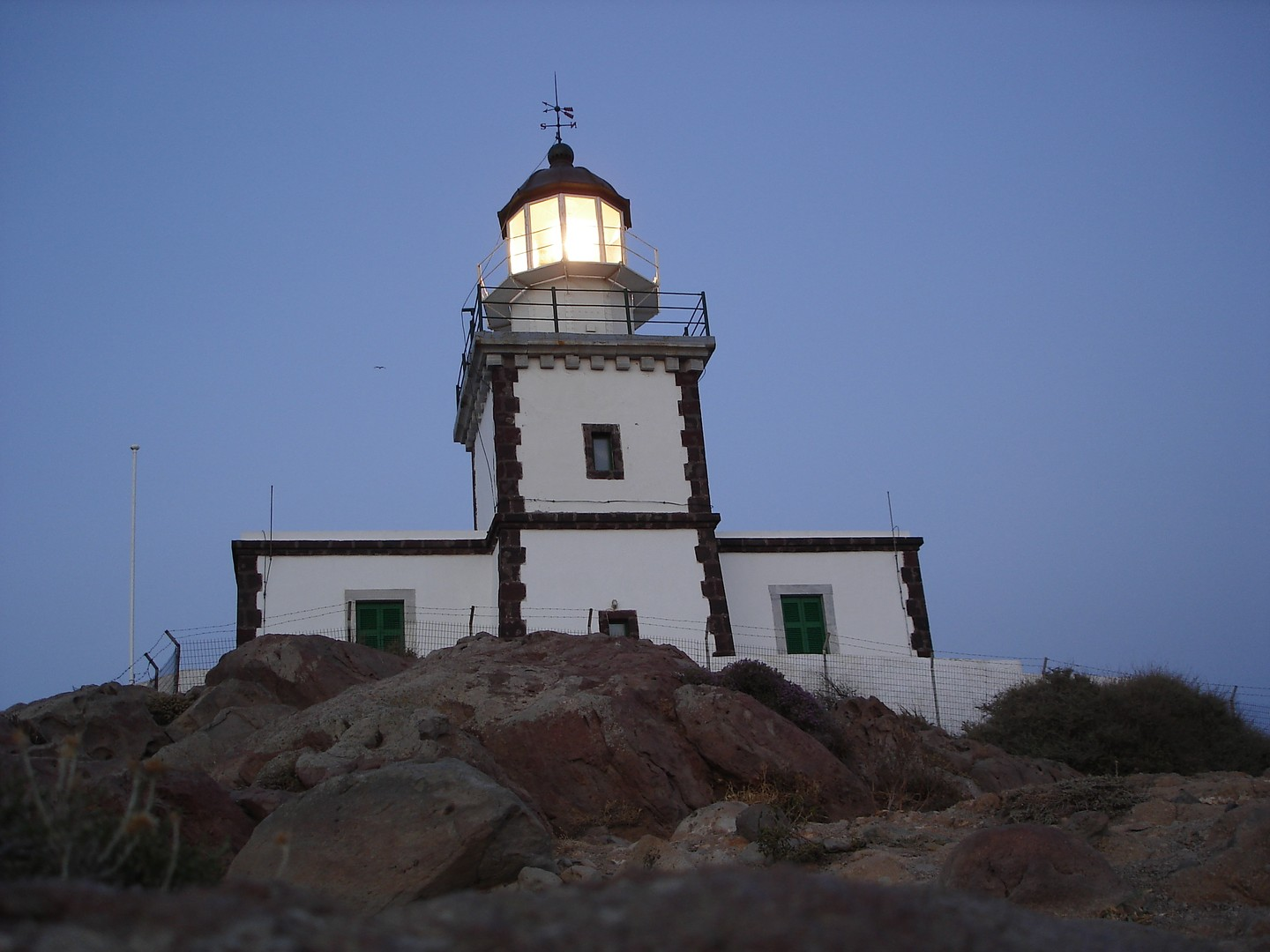
- Akroti Lighthouse
- Location: Akrotiri, Santorini, Greece
- Coordinates: 36°21′28″N 25°21′25″E

Tower
- Constructed: 1892
- Foundation: Natural emplacement
- Construction: Concrete

Light
- First lit: 1892

Akrotiri Lighthouse is a 19th-century lighthouse on the Greek island of Santorini. The lighthouse was built by a French company in 1892, making the lighthouse one of the oldest in Greece. The lighthouse ceased operating during World War II. The Greek Navy recommissioned the lighthouse in 1945. The lighthouse is famed for its sunset views.
