= Akrotiri, Santorini =

Akrotiri Ακρωτήρι
- Community
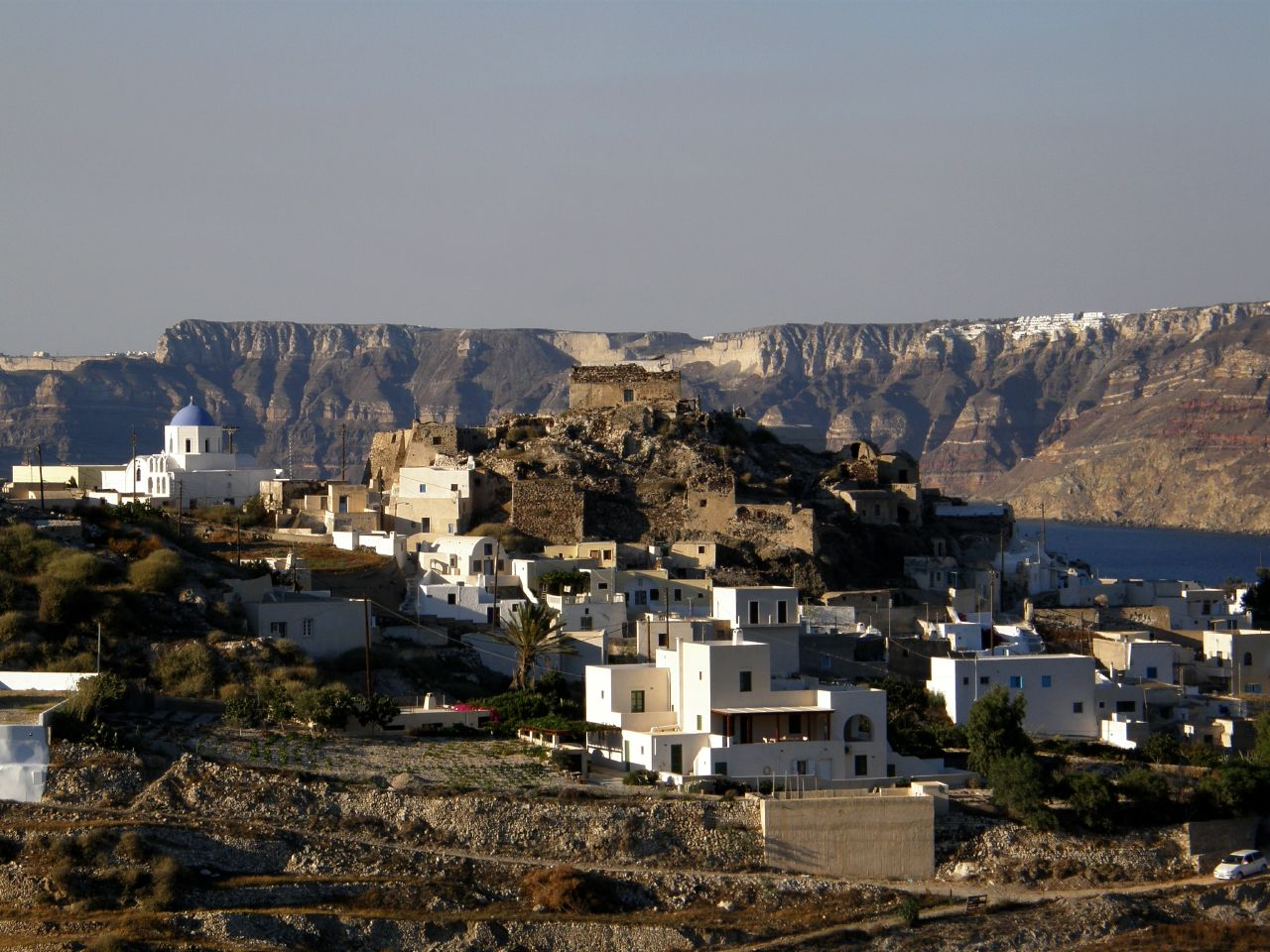
- View of Akrotiri from the south

- Location within Greece
- Coordinates: 36°21′06″N 25°24′13″E
- Country: Greece
- Administrative region: South Aegean
- Regional unit: Thira
- Municipality: Thira
- Municipal unit: Thira

Population (2021)
  - Community: 515
- Time zone: UTC+2 (EET)
  - Summer (DST): UTC+3 (EEST)

Akrotiri (Greek: Ακρωτήρι) is a village and a community on the island of Santorini in Greece. It is located 15 kilometers south of the capital Fira, built on the slopes of a hill offering staggering views of the caldera cliffs. On top of this hill, there are remains of a Venetian castle (Goulas). Akrotiri is part of the Thira region and had 515 permanent inhabitants according to the Greek census of 2021.

Approximately 2 km southeast, the Minoan Bronze Age Akrotiri archaeological site is located. This is one of the most important of its kind in the Aegean.

West of Akrotiri and on Santorini's westmost tip, there is a lighthouse dating from 1892. Much of the town is built around the ruins of a 13th-century fortress, the Castle of Akrotiri.

== Gallery ==
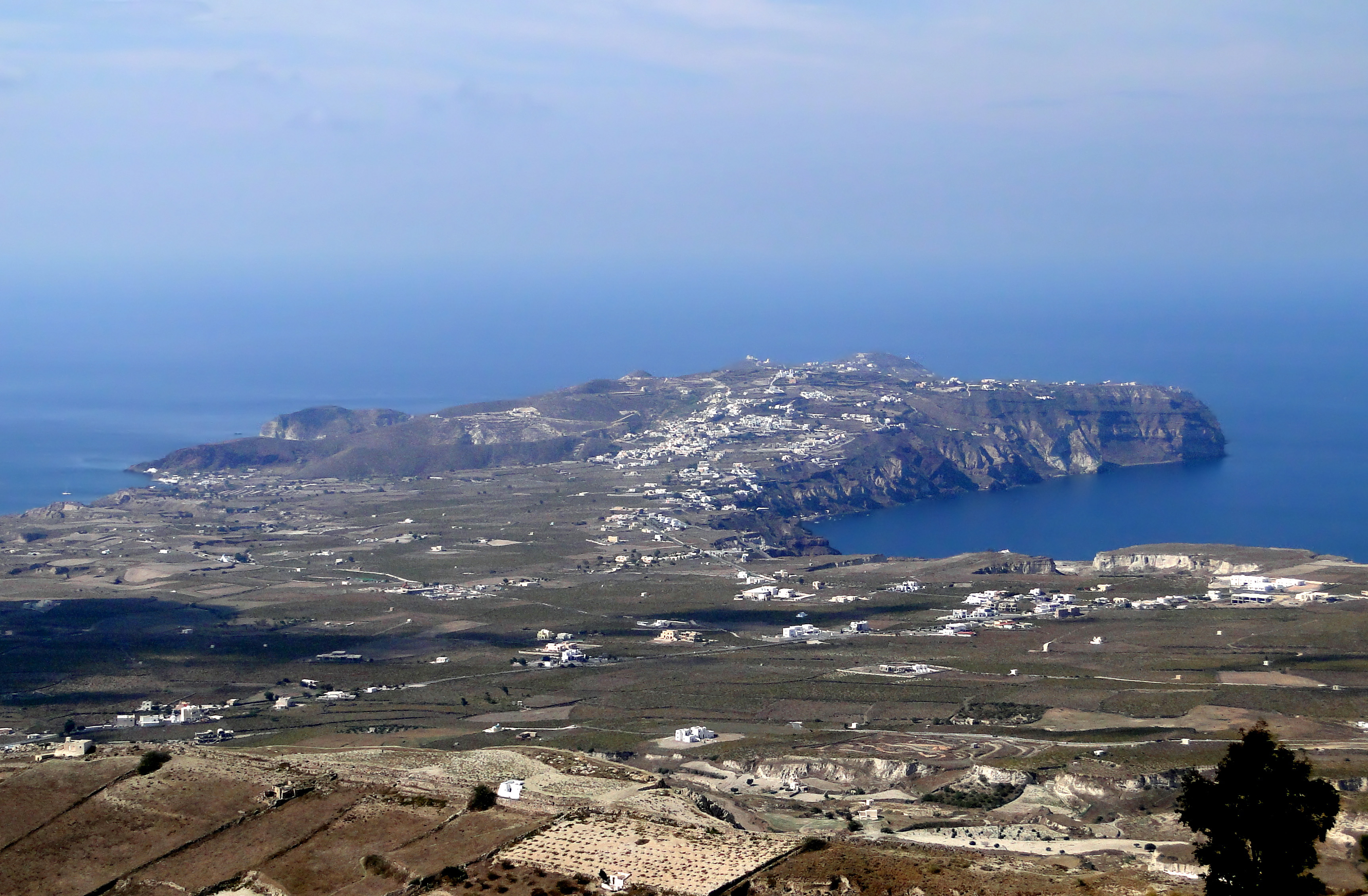
West view of Santorini and Akrotiri

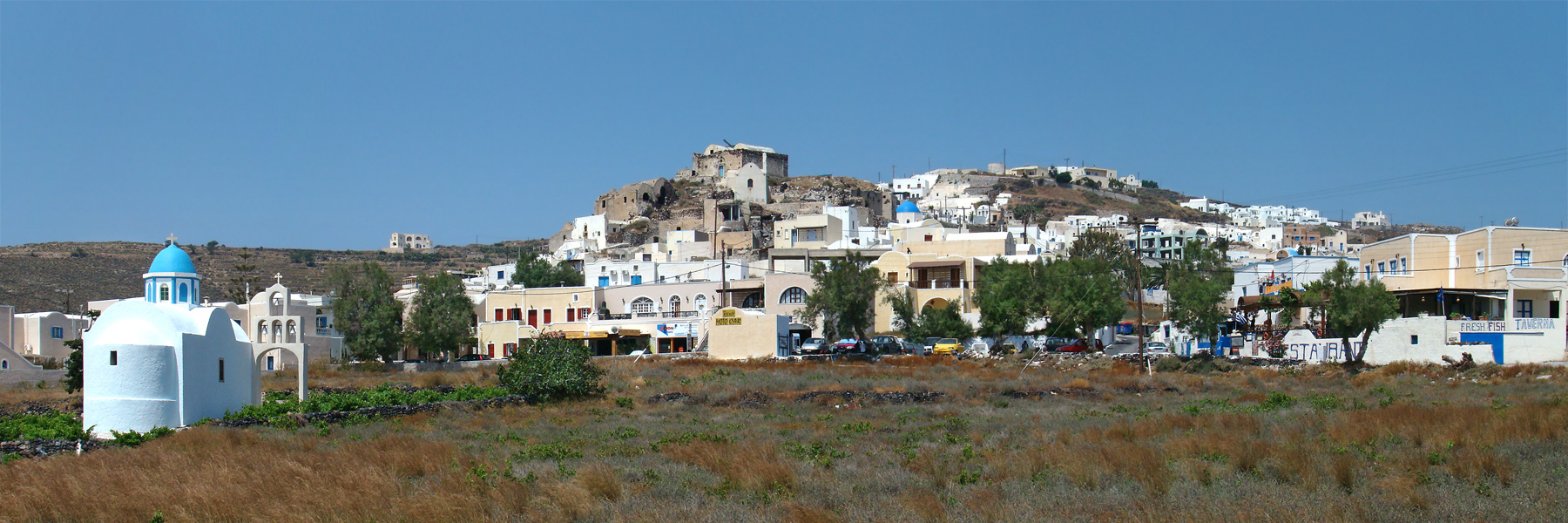
West view closeup

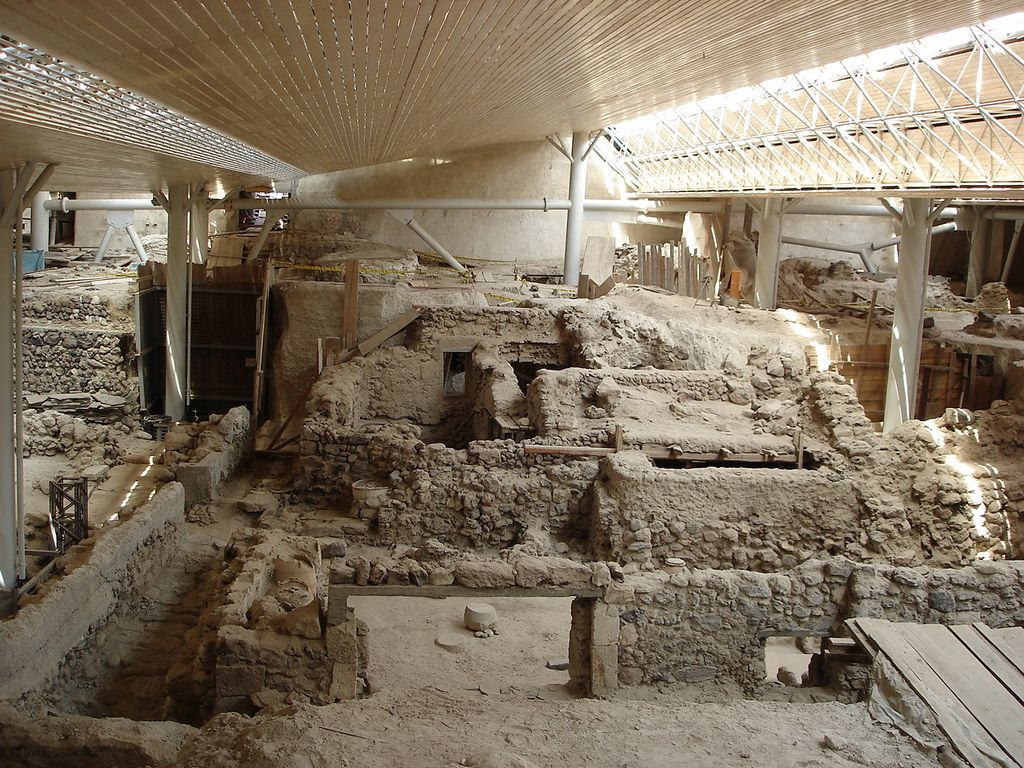
Akrotiri Minoan settlement

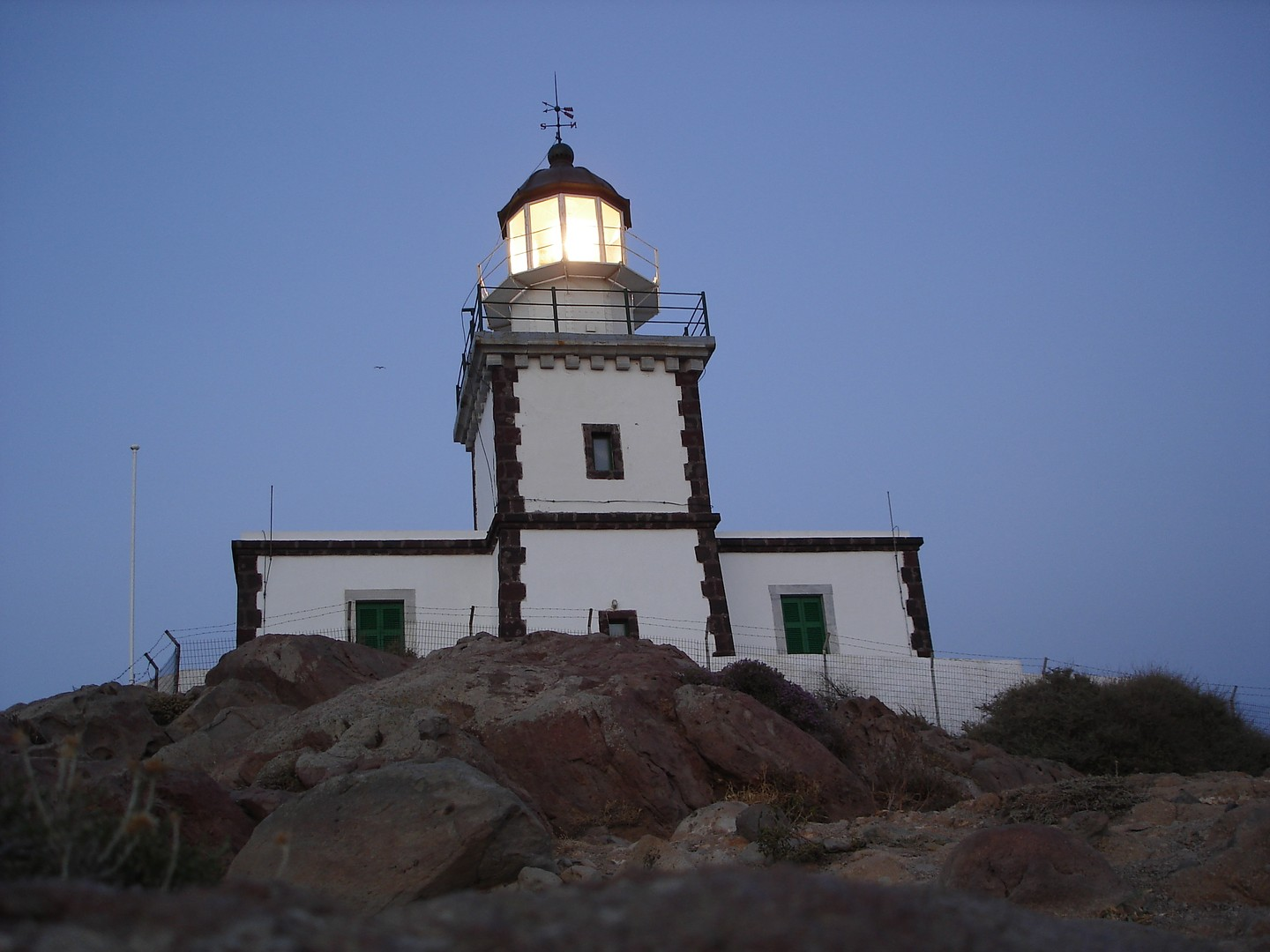
The lighthouse near Akrotiri

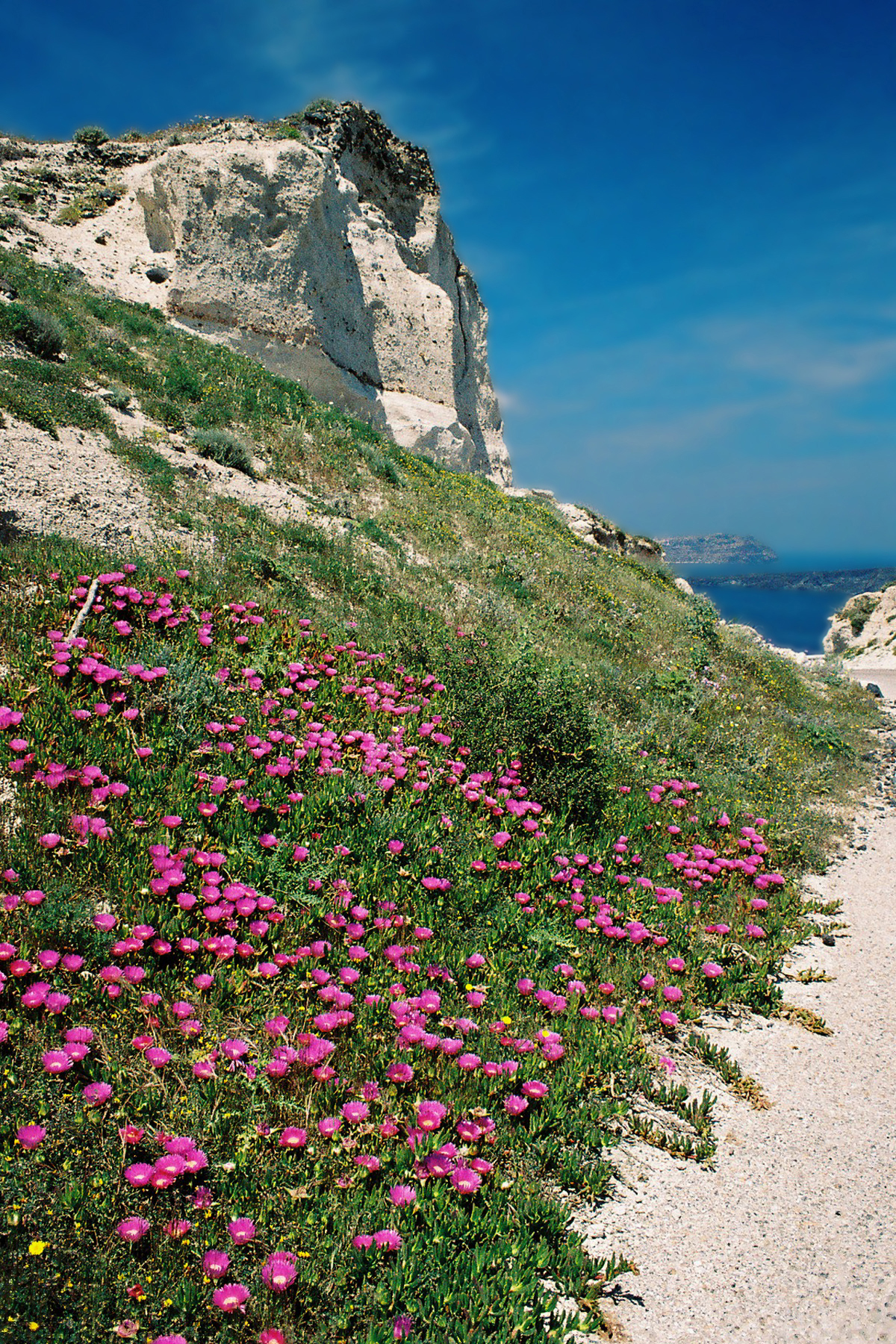
Weathered soil of pumice near "Balos Harbour", flourishing Lampranthus

== See also ==
- Akrotiri (prehistoric city)
