= List of The Amazing Race China contestants =

This is a list of contestants who have appeared on The Amazing Race China, a Chinese reality competition show based on the American series, The Amazing Race. A total of 63 contestants have appeared in the series.

== Contestants ==
Contestant participated in The Amazing Race China for a second time.

| Name | Age | Hometown | Season | Finish | Source |
|---|---|---|---|---|---|
| Ying Cai'er | 31 | Taipei, Taiwan | Season 1 | 8th | |
| Liu Yun | 32 | Changsha, Hunan | Season 1 | 8th | |
| Zhang Tielin | 57 | Tangshan, Hebei | Season 1 | 7th | |
| Zhang Yueliang | 23 | United Kingdom | Season 1 | 7th | |
| Chen Yiru | 34 | Taipei, Taiwan | Season 1 | 6th | |
| Zhou Weitong | 32 | Qiandongnanzhou, Guizhou | Season 1 | 6th | |
| Chen Xiaochun | 47 | Hong Kong | Season 1 | 5th | |
| Zheng Yijian | 47 | Hong Kong | Season 1 | 5th | |
| Jin Dachuan | 21 | Tai'an, Shandong | Season 1 | 4th | |
| Liu Chang | 28 | Dongtai, Jiangsu | Season 1 | 4th | |
| Bai Jugang | 21 | Mianyang, Sichuan | Season 1 | 3rd | |
| Guan Xiaotong | 17 | Beijing | Season 1 | 3rd | |
| Li Xiaopeng | 33 | Changsha, Hunan | Season 1 | 2nd | |
| Li Anqi | 27 | United States | Season 1 | 2nd | |
| Zhong Hanliang | 40 | Hong Kong | Season 1 | 1st | |
| Zhong "Jackie" Xiuping | 38 | Hong Kong | Season 1 | 1st | |
| Feng Zhe | 27 | Chengdu, Sichuan | Season 2 | 8th | |
| Zhu Zhu | 30 | Beijing | Season 2 | 8th | |
| Zeng Zhiwei | 62 | Hong Kong | Season 2 | 7th | |
| Zeng Baoyi | 42 | Hong Kong | Season 2 | 7th | |
| Deng Ziqi | 23 | Shanghai | Season 2 | 6th | |
| Zhang Yunjing | 31 | Taipei, Taiwan | Season 2 | 6th | |
| Yuan Zihui | 37 | Hong Kong | Season 2 | 5th | |
| Yuan Heyu | 30 | Hong Kong | Season 2 | 5th | |
| Kim Jong-kook | 39 | Seoul, South Korea | Season 2 | 4th | |
| Lee Kwang-soo | 30 | Namyangju, South Korea | Season 2 | 4th | |
| Xiao Yang | 35 | Chengde, Hebei | Season 2 | 3rd | |
| Wang Taili | 46 | Weifang, Shandong | Season 2 | 3rd | |
| Yang Qianhua | 41 | Hong Kong | Season 2 | 2nd | |
| Ding Zigao | 36 | Shanghai | Season 2 | 2nd | |
| Han Geng | 31 | Mudanjiang, Heilongjiang | Season 2 | 1st | |
| Wu Xin | 32 | Shenyang, Liaoning | Season 2 | 1st | |
| Zhang Meixi | 32 | Shenzhen, Guangzhou | Season 3 | 8th | |
| Zang Yafei | 36 | Yanbian, Jilin | Season 3 | 8th | |
| Ji Longxiang | | | Season 3 | —N/a | |
| Huang Tingting | 24 | Nanjing, Jiangsu | Season 3 | 7th | |
| Sun Rui | 24 | Harbin, Heilongjiang | Season 3 | 7th | |
| Jin Xing | 48 | Shenyang, Liaoning | Season 3 | 6th | |
| Heinz Oidtmann | 48 | Germany | Season 3 | 6th | |
| Zhang Zhehan | 25 | Xinyu, Jiangxi | Season 3 | 5th | |
| Zhang Sifan | 23 | Beijing | Season 3 | 5th | |
| Wu Jianhao | 38 | Santa Monica, California | Season 3 | 4th | |
| Yao Fengfeng | 25 | Santa Monica, California | Season 3 | 4th | |
| Liu Xiang | 33 | Shanghai | Season 3 | 3rd | |
| Xu Qifeng | 33 | Shanghai | Season 3 | 3rd | |
| Jin Dachuan | 23 | Tai'an, Shandong | Season 3 | 2nd | |
| Liu Chang | 30 | Dongtai, Jiangsu | Season 3 | 2nd | |
| Guo Jingjing | 34 | Baoding, Hebei | Season 3 | 1st | |
| Huo Qigang | 37 | Hong Kong | Season 3 | 1st | |
| Huang Tingting | 25 | Nanjing, Jiangsu | Season 4 | —N/a | |
| Deng Bin | 20 | Yongzhou, Hunan | Season 4 | 8th | |
| Wang Xinyu | 21 | Shiyan, Hubei | Season 4 | 8th | |
| Fan Bingbing | 36 | Qingdao, Shandong | Season 4 | 7th | |
| Xie Yilin | 27 | Yuli, Hualien | Season 4 | 7th | |
| Lu Ting | 24 | Shanghai | Season 4 | 6th | |
| Xuyang Yuzhuo | 22 | Yueyang, Hunan | Season 4 | 6th | |
| Zhang Jike | 29 | Qingdao, Shandong | Season 4 | 5th | |
| Zhang Chuanming | | Qingdao, Shandong | Season 4 | 5th | |
| Qiang Zi | 35 | Shanxi | Season 4 | 4th | |
| Zhang Xingyue | 25 | Zhoukou, Henan | Season 4 | 4th | |
| Wu Minxia | 31 | Shanghai | Season 4 | 3rd | |
| Zhang Xiaocheng | 31 | Shanghai | Season 4 | 3rd | |
| Zheng Yuanchang | 35 | Beitun, Taiwan | Season 4 | 2nd | |
| Wang Likun | 32 | Chifeng, Inner Mongolia | Season 4 | 2nd | |
| Jia Jingwen | 42 | Taipei, Taiwan | Season 4 | 1st | |
| Xiu Jiekai | 34 | Taipei, Taiwan | Season 4 | 1st | |

== Gallery ==
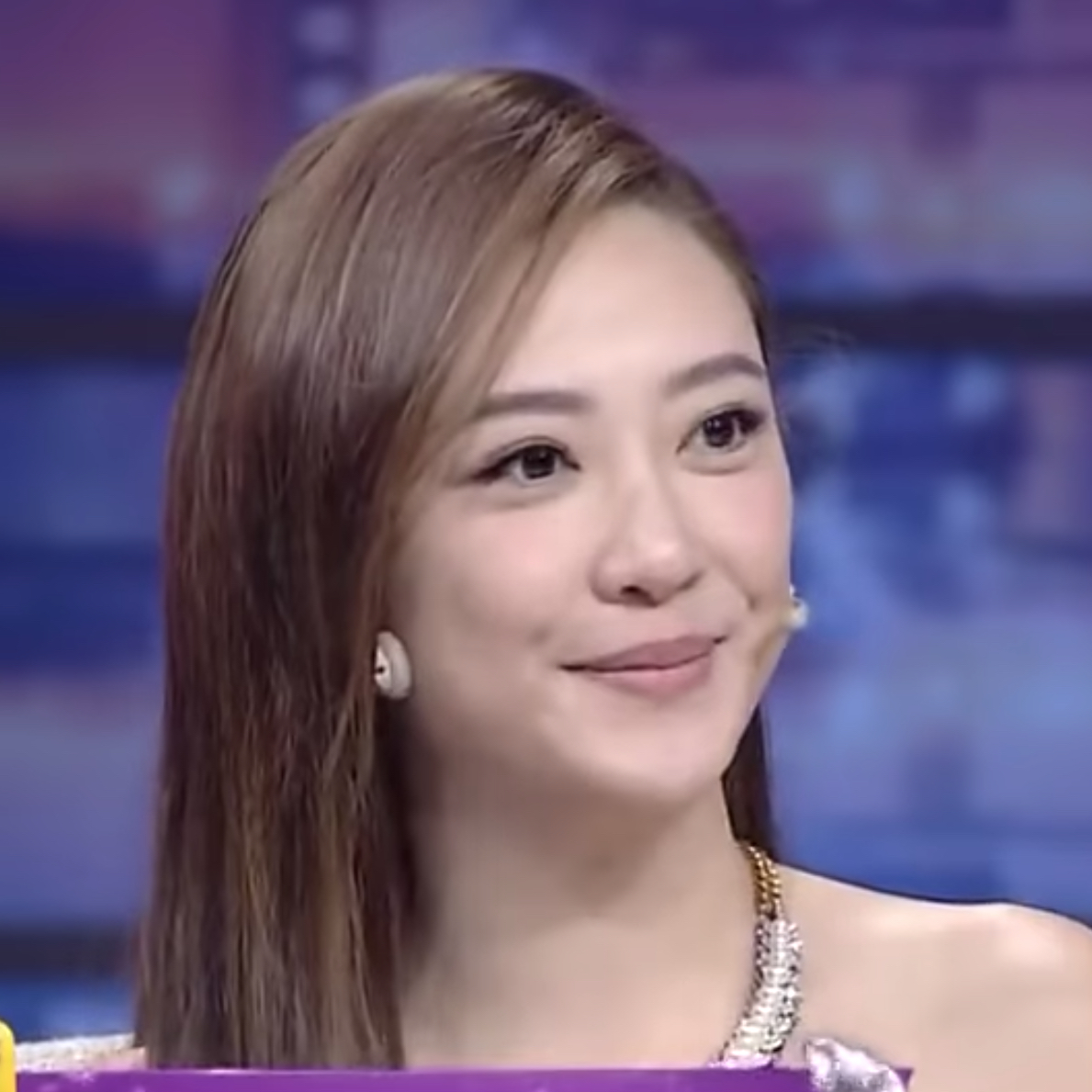
Ying Cai'er from The Amazing Race 1

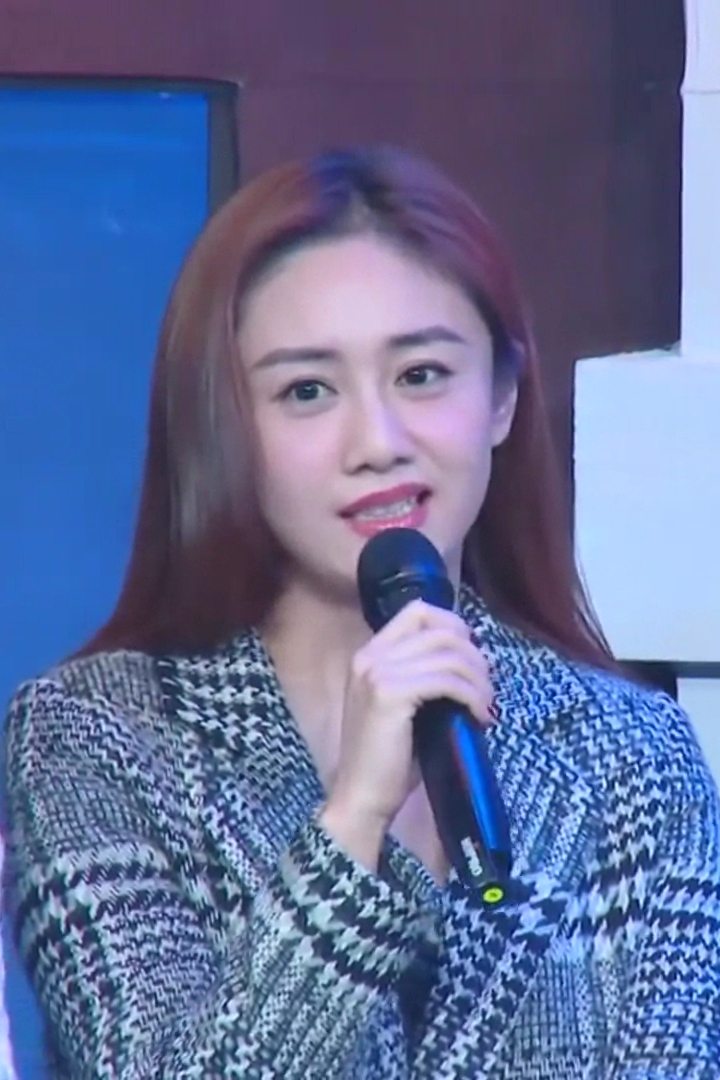
Liu Yun from The Amazing Race 1

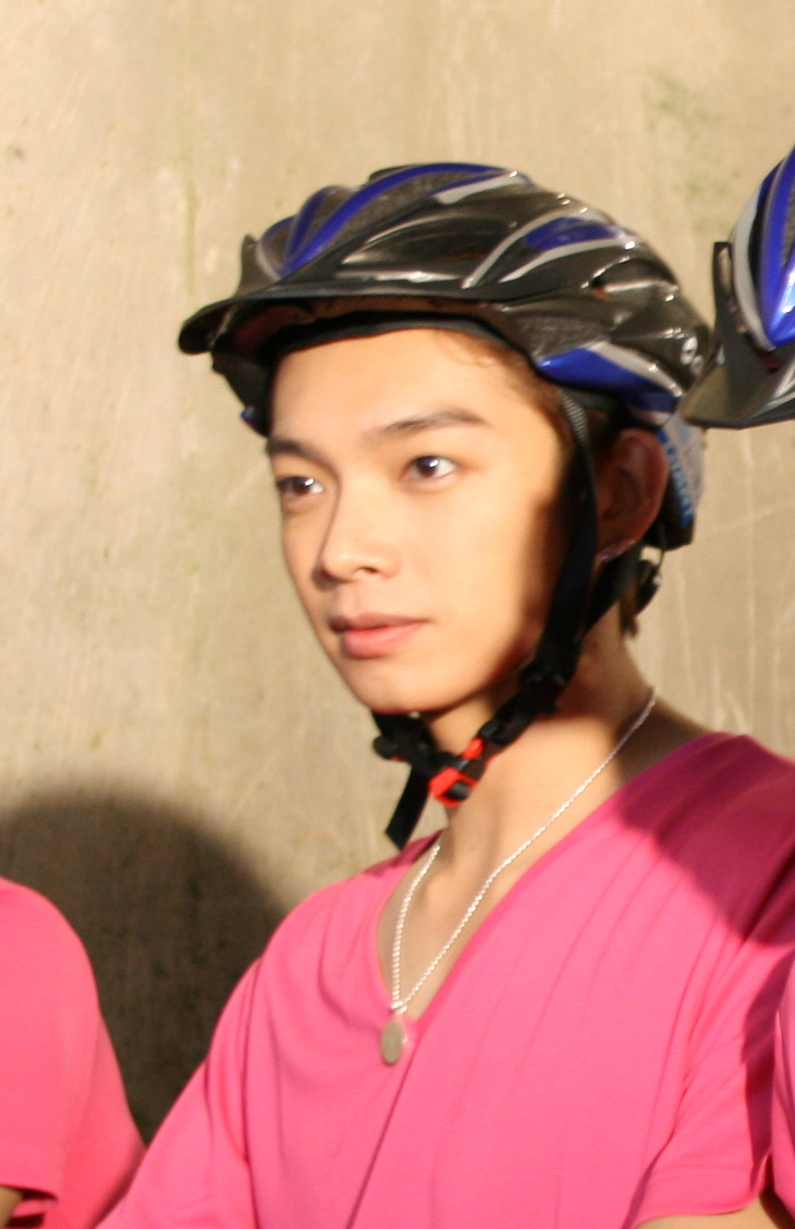
Chen Yiru from The Amazing Race 1

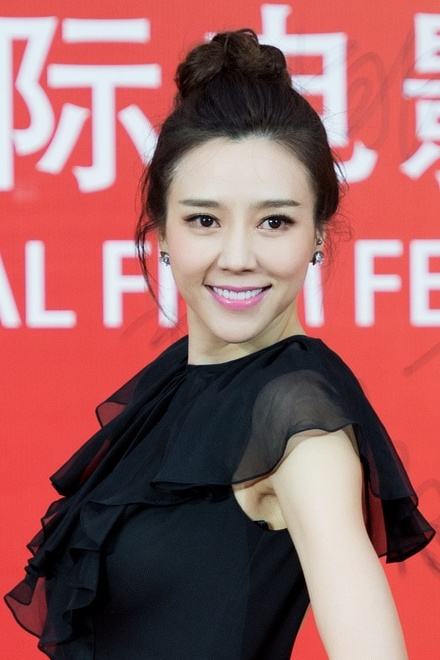
Zhou Weitong from The Amazing Race 1

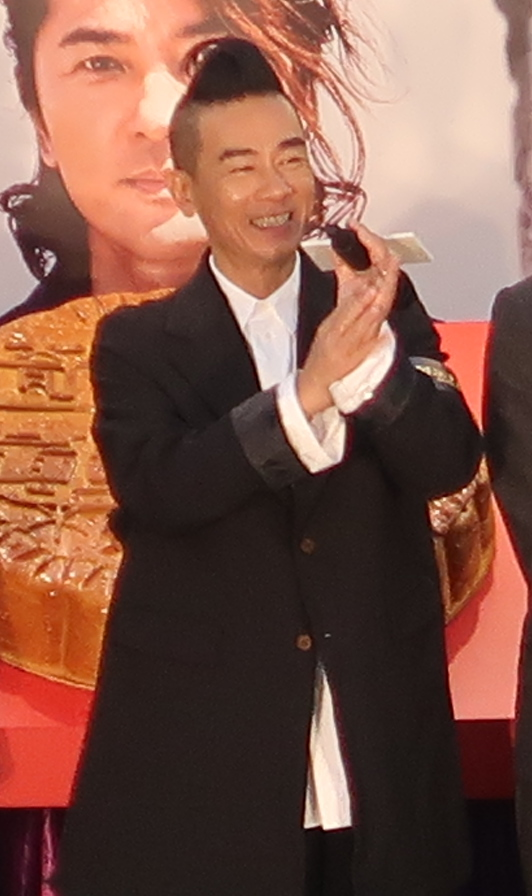
Chen Xiaochun from The Amazing Race 1

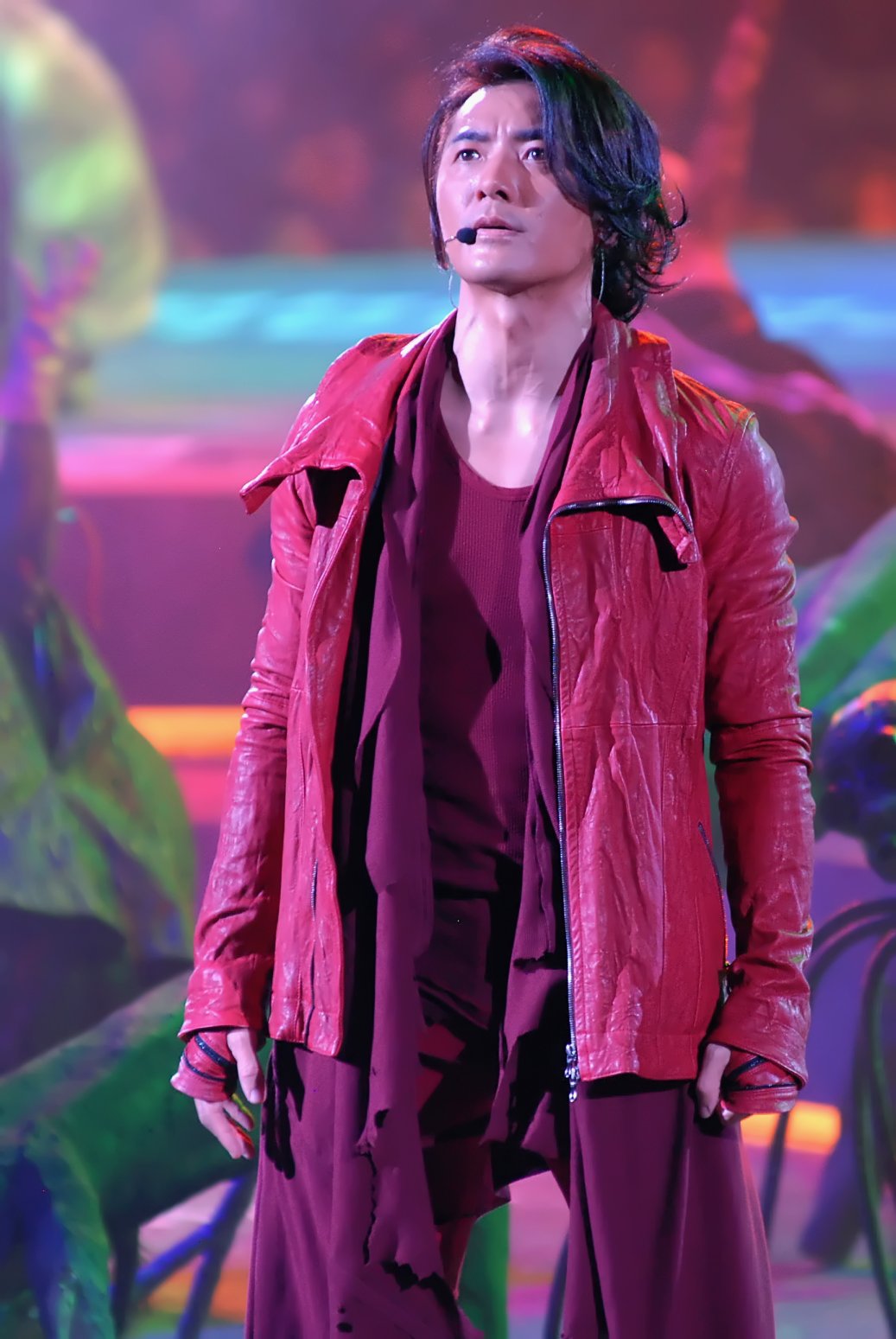
Zheng Yijian from The Amazing Race 1

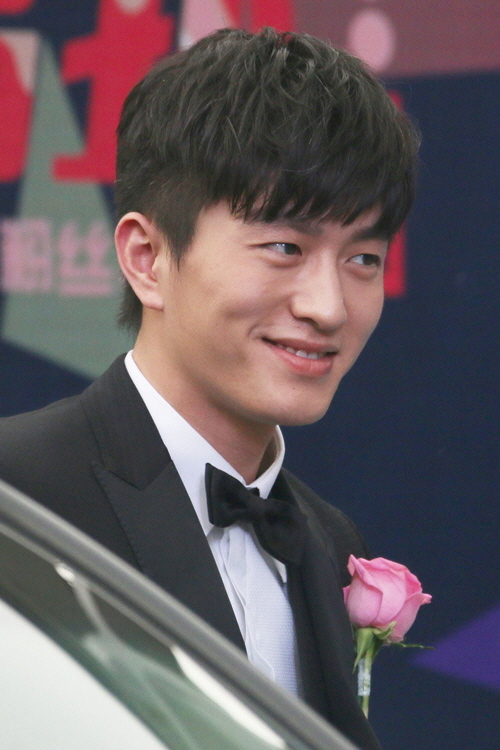
Jin Dachuan from The Amazing Race 1 and The Amazing Race China 3

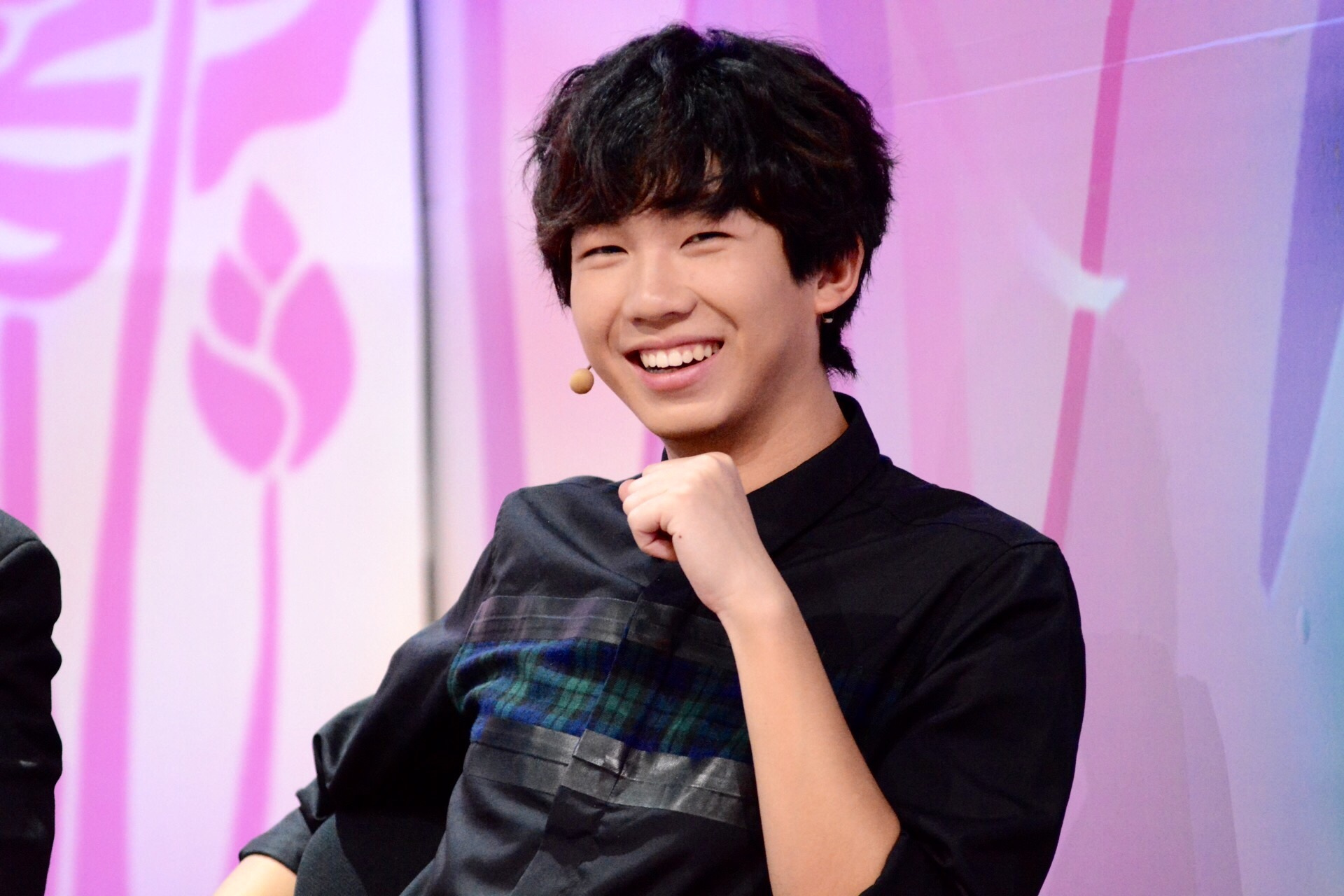
Bai Jugang from The Amazing Race 1

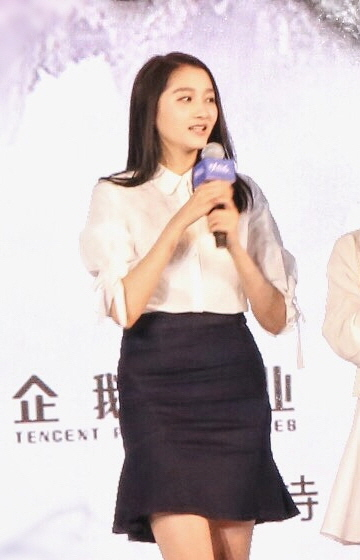
Guan Xiaotong from The Amazing Race 1

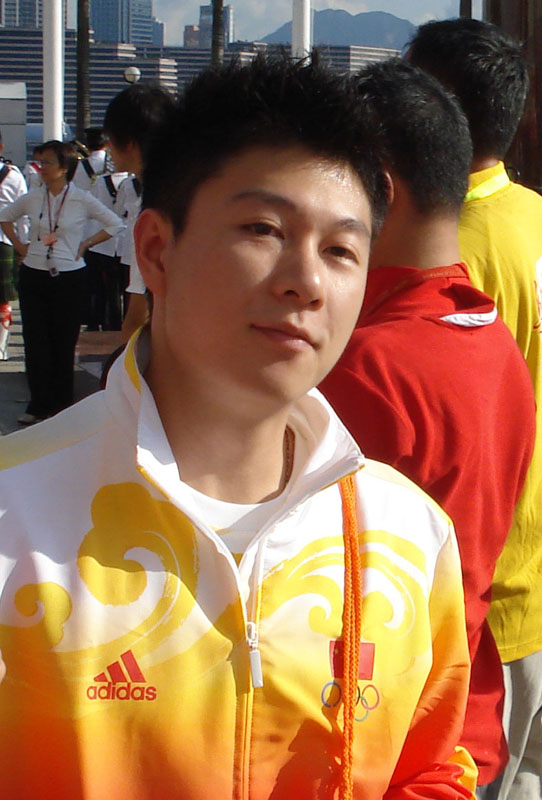
Li Xiaopeng from The Amazing Race 1

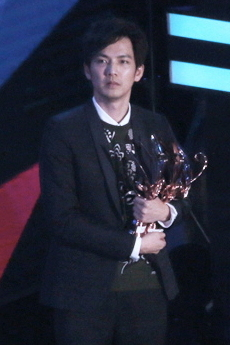
Zhong Hanliang from The Amazing Race 1

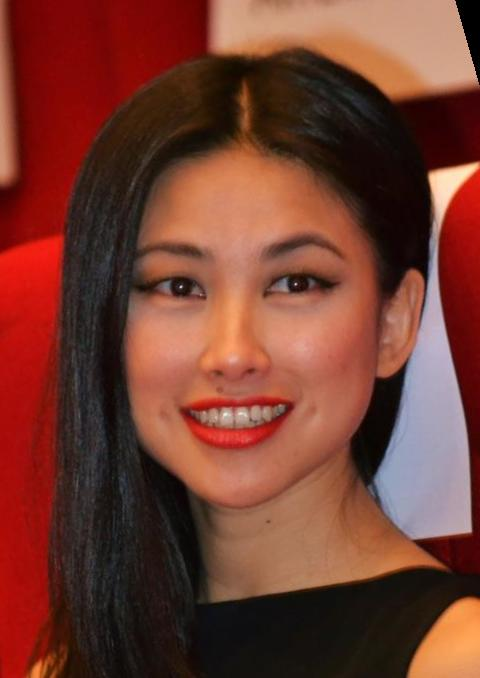
Zhu Zhu from The Amazing Race 2

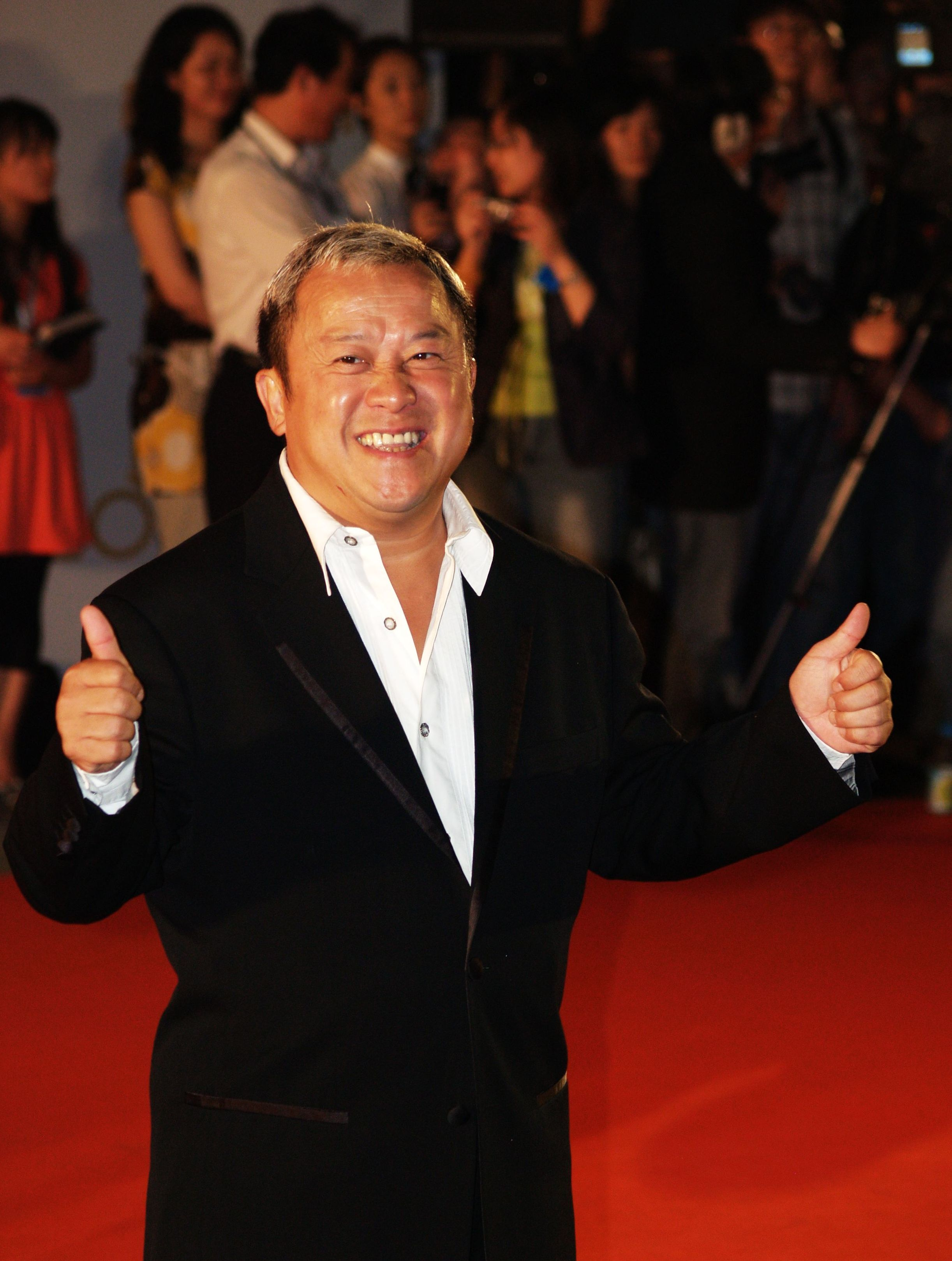
Zeng Zhiwei from The Amazing Race 2

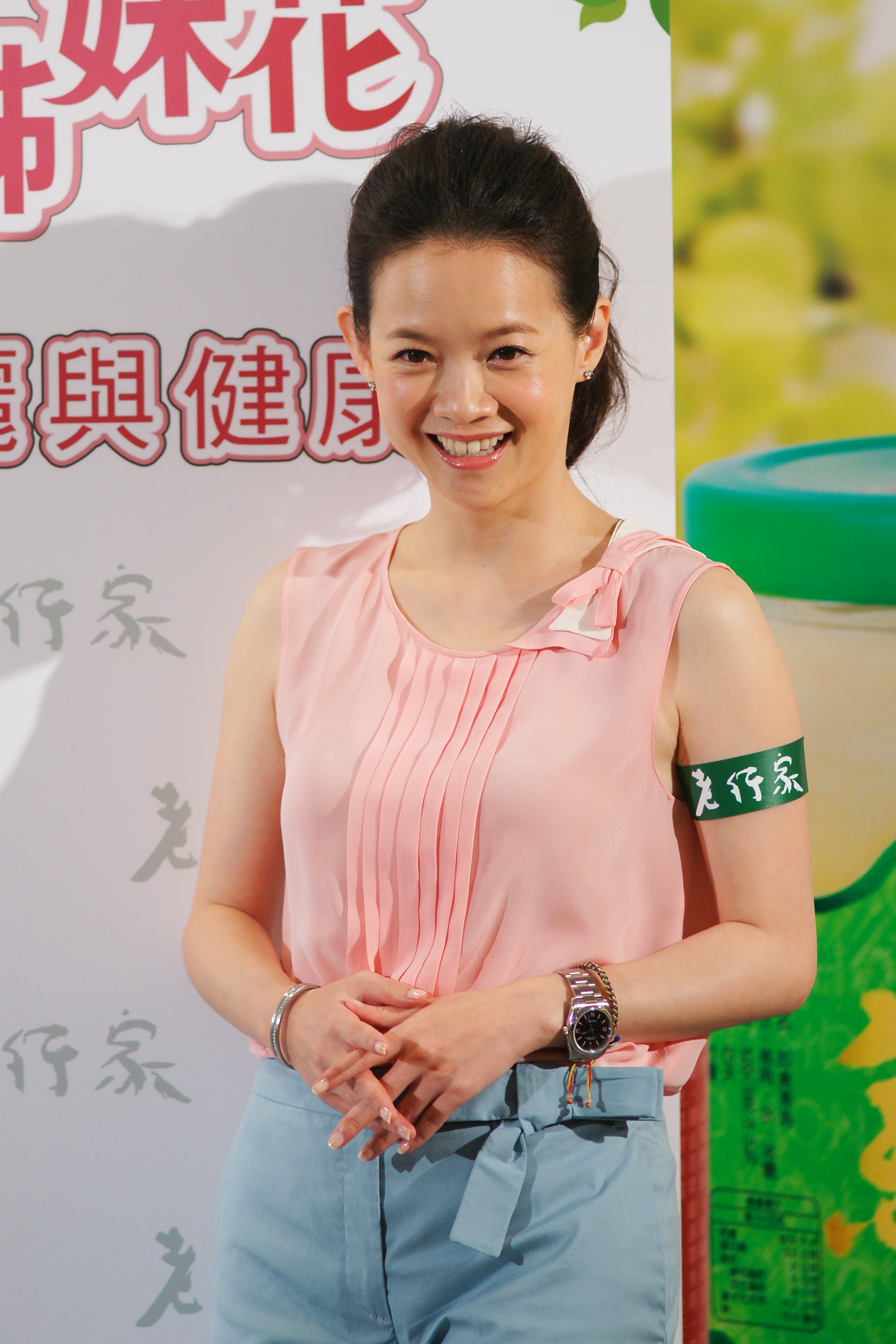
Zeng Baoyi from The Amazing Race 2

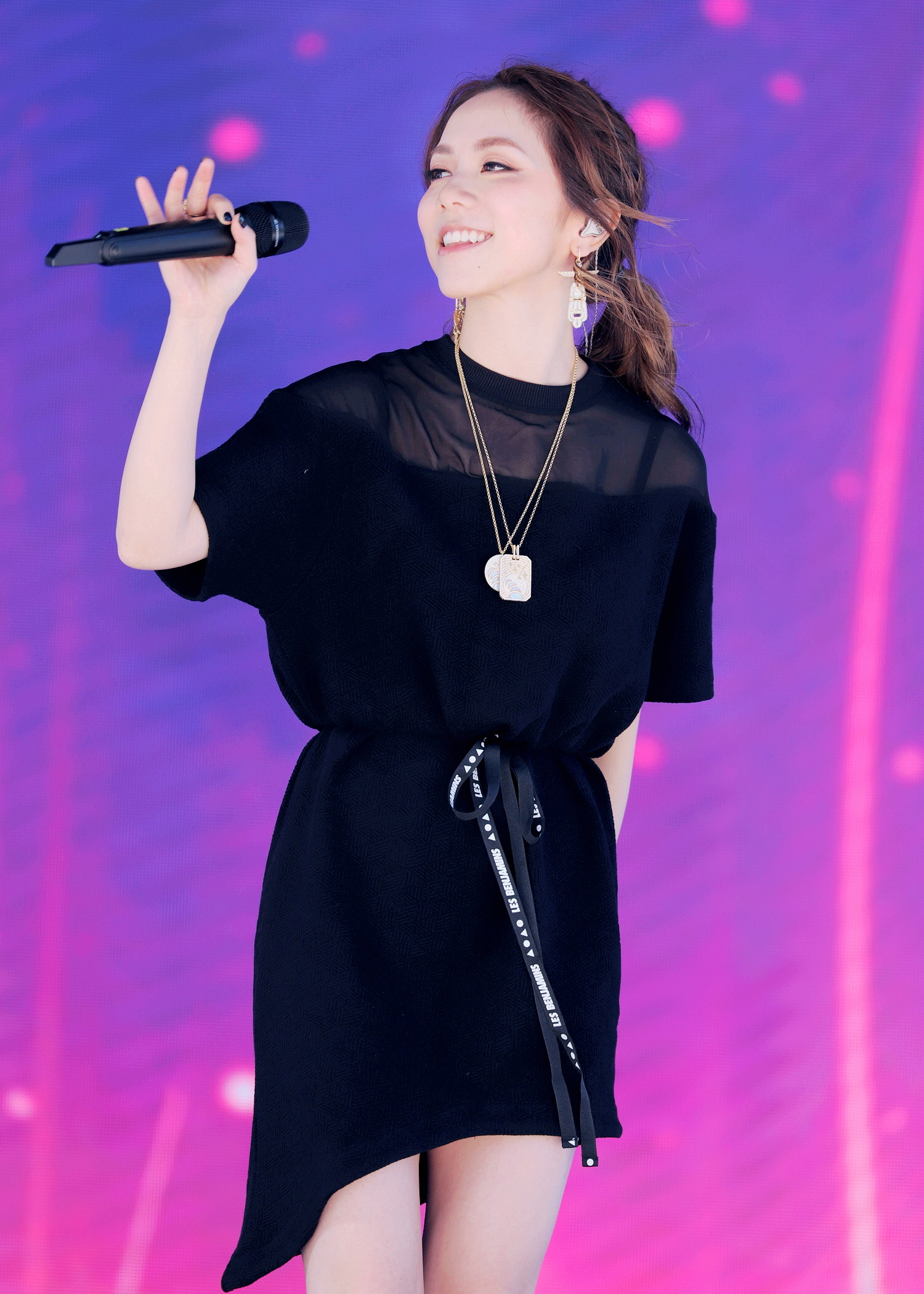
Deng Ziqi from The Amazing Race 2

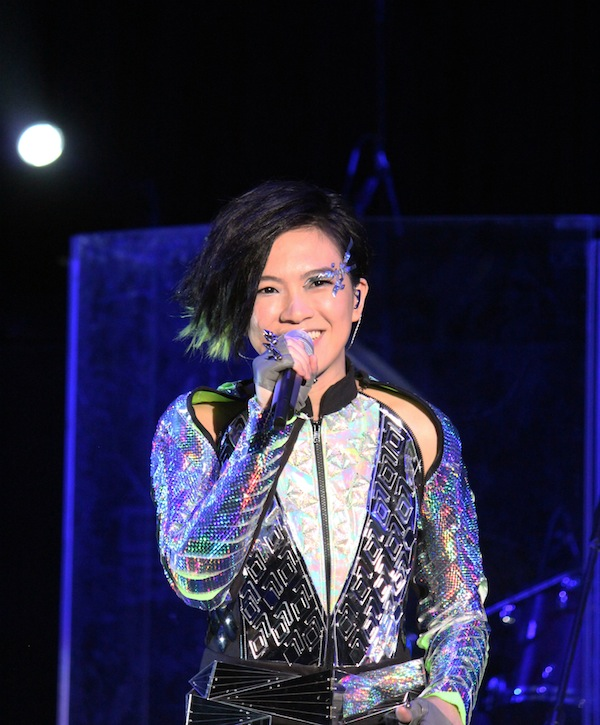
Zhang Yunjing from The Amazing Race 2

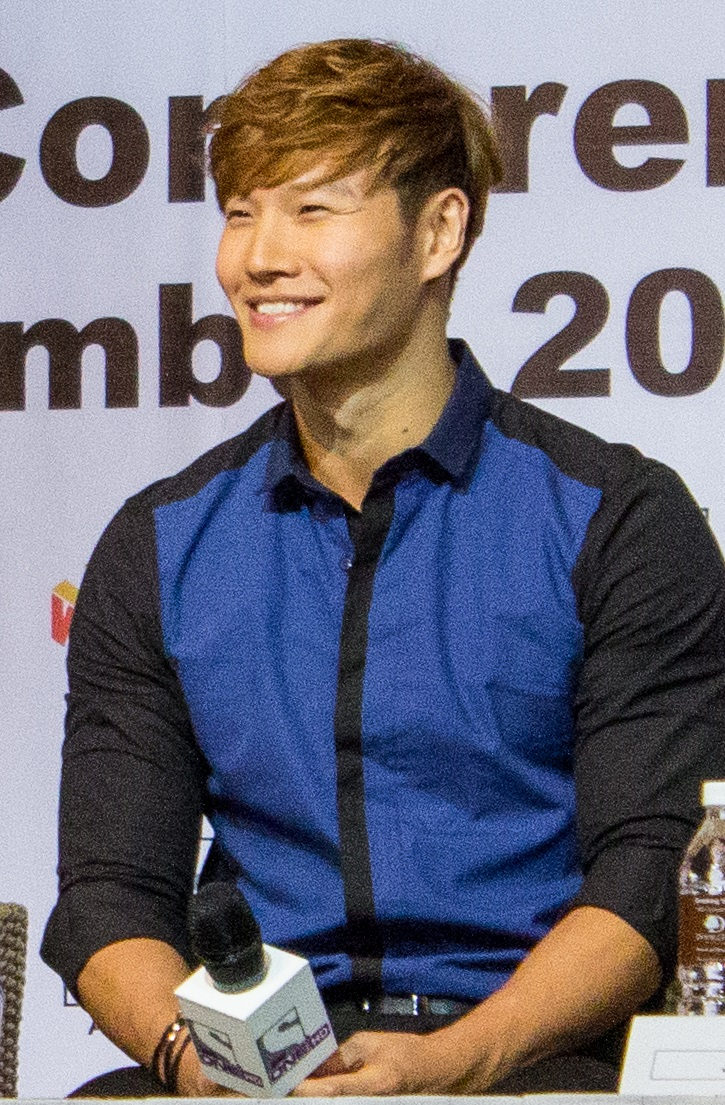
Kim Jong-kook from The Amazing Race 2

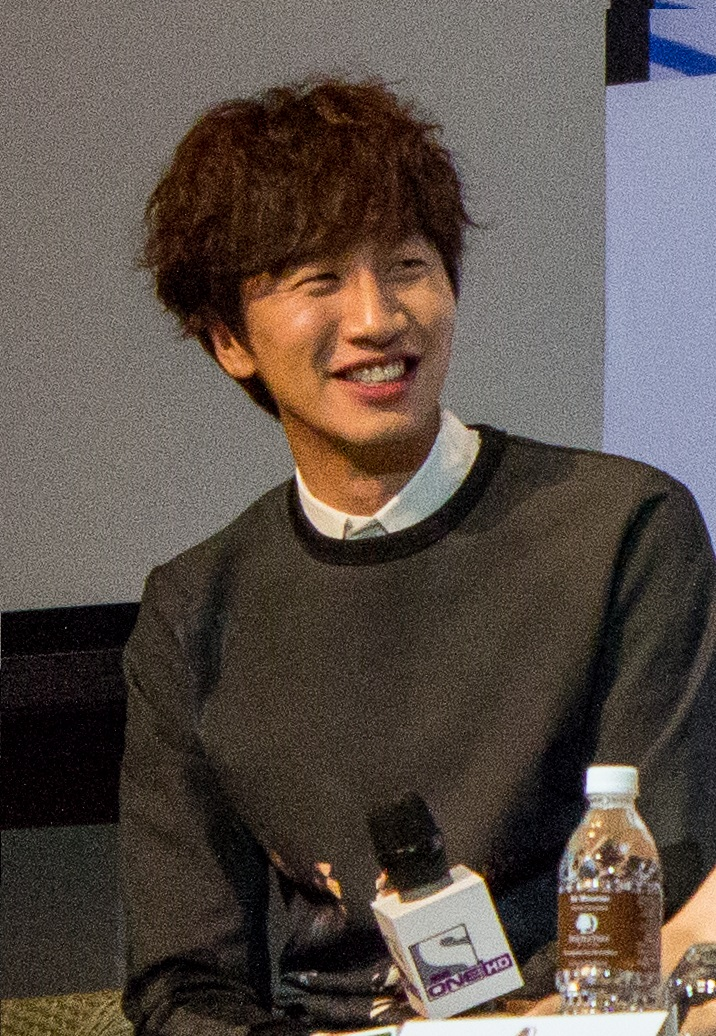
Lee Kwang-soo from The Amazing Race 2

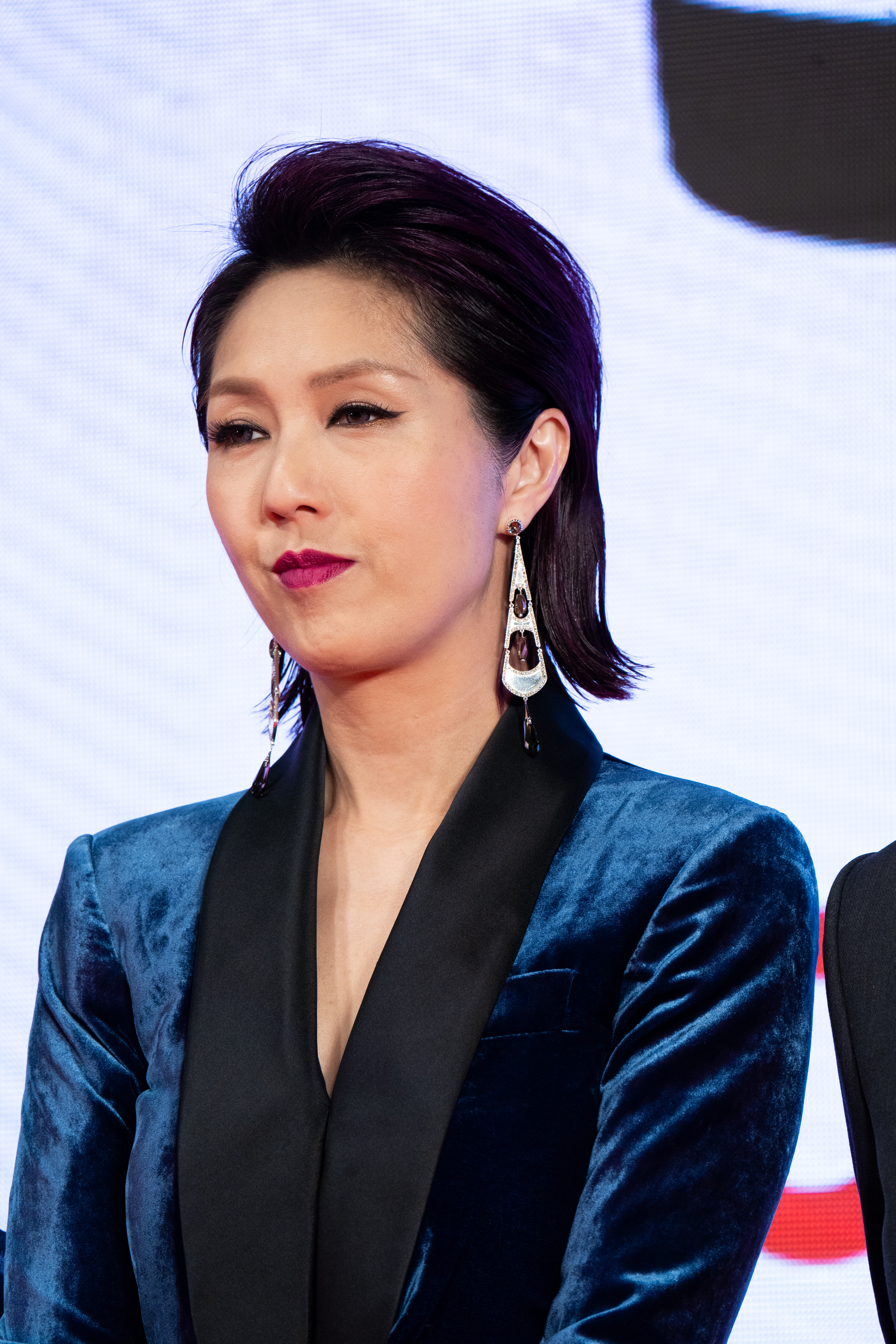
Yang Qianhua from The Amazing Race 2

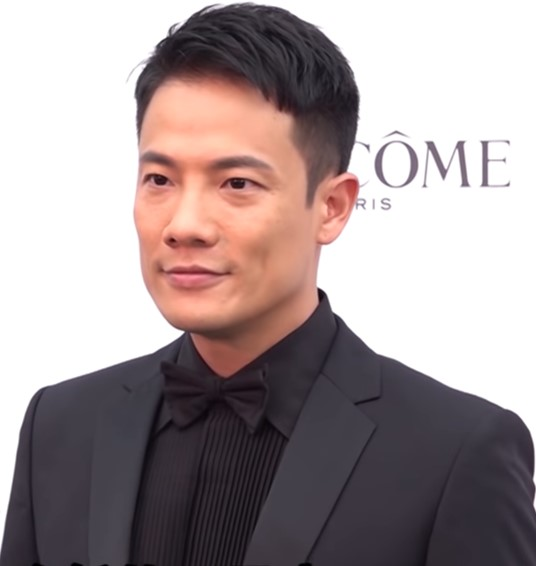
Ding Zigao from The Amazing Race 2

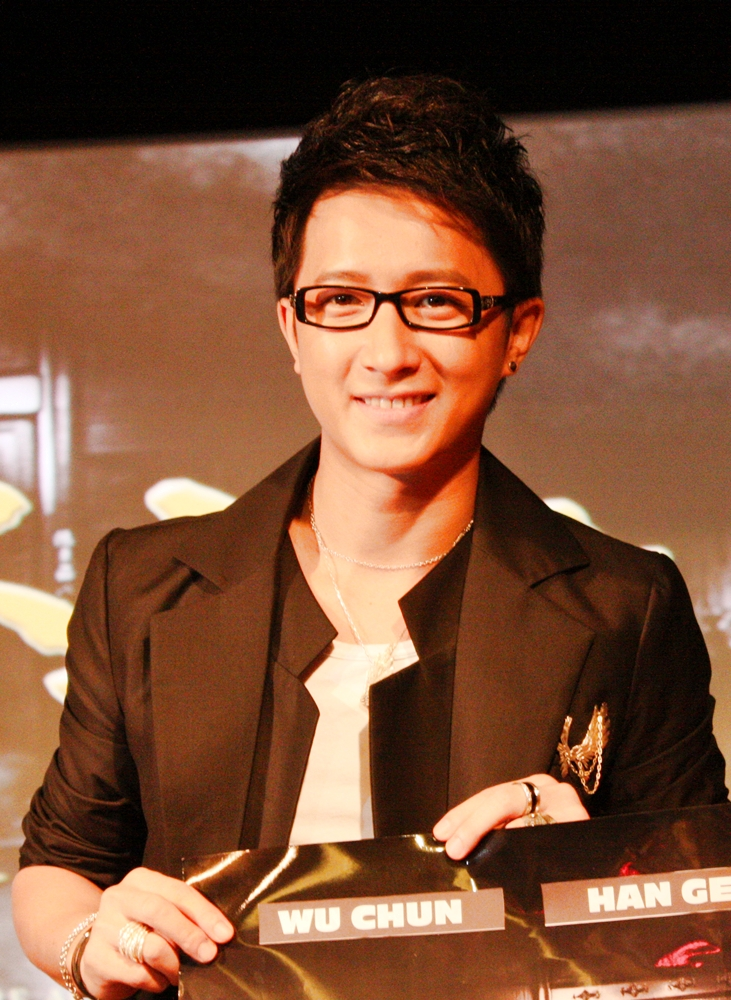
Han Geng from The Amazing Race 2

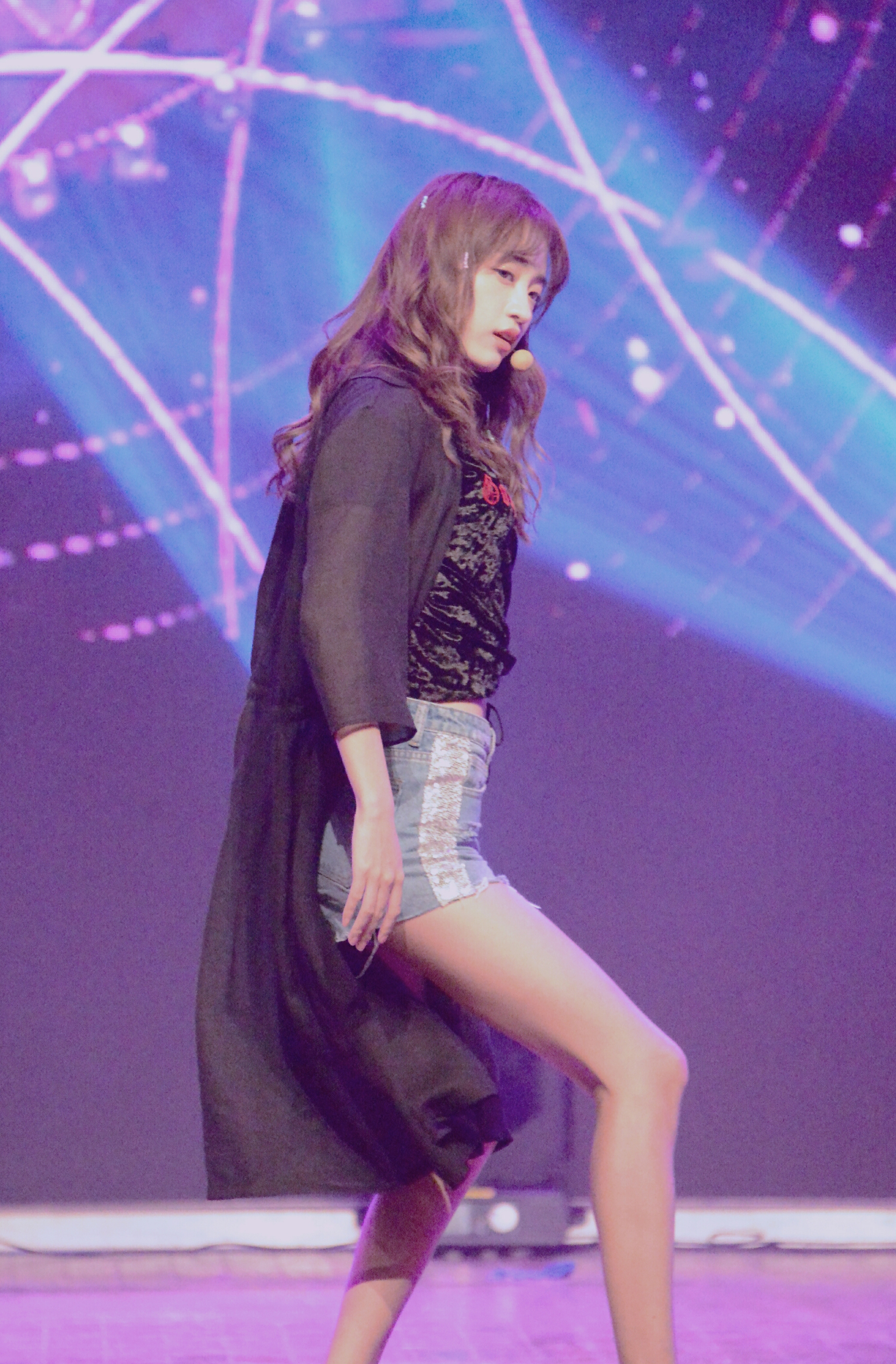
Huang Tingting from The Amazing Race China 3 and The Amazing Race China 4

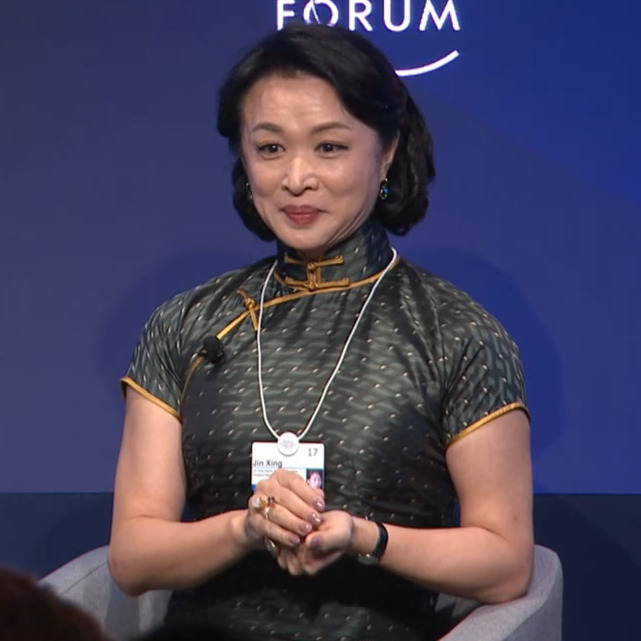
Jin Xing from The Amazing Race China 3

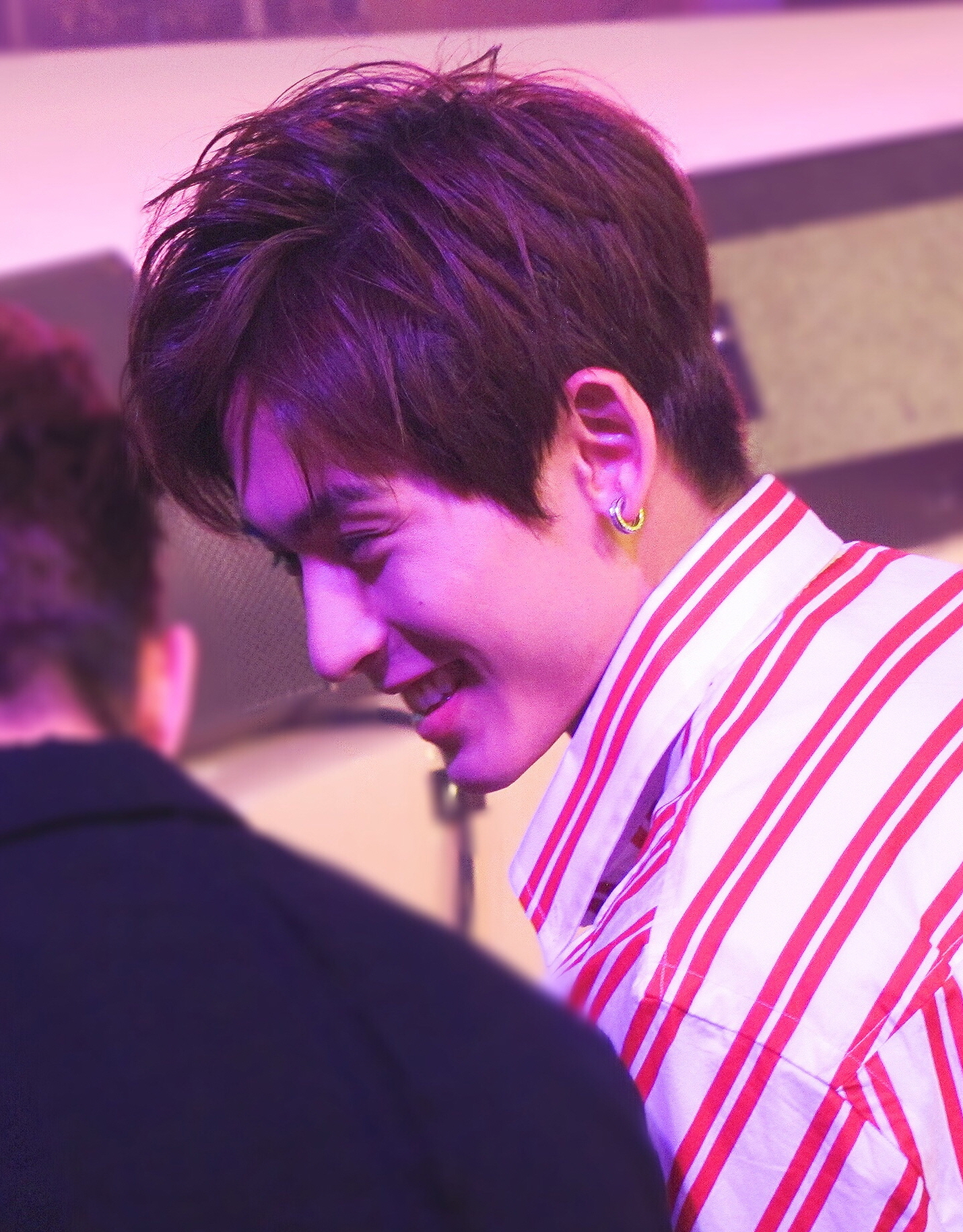
Zhang Zhehan from The Amazing Race China 3

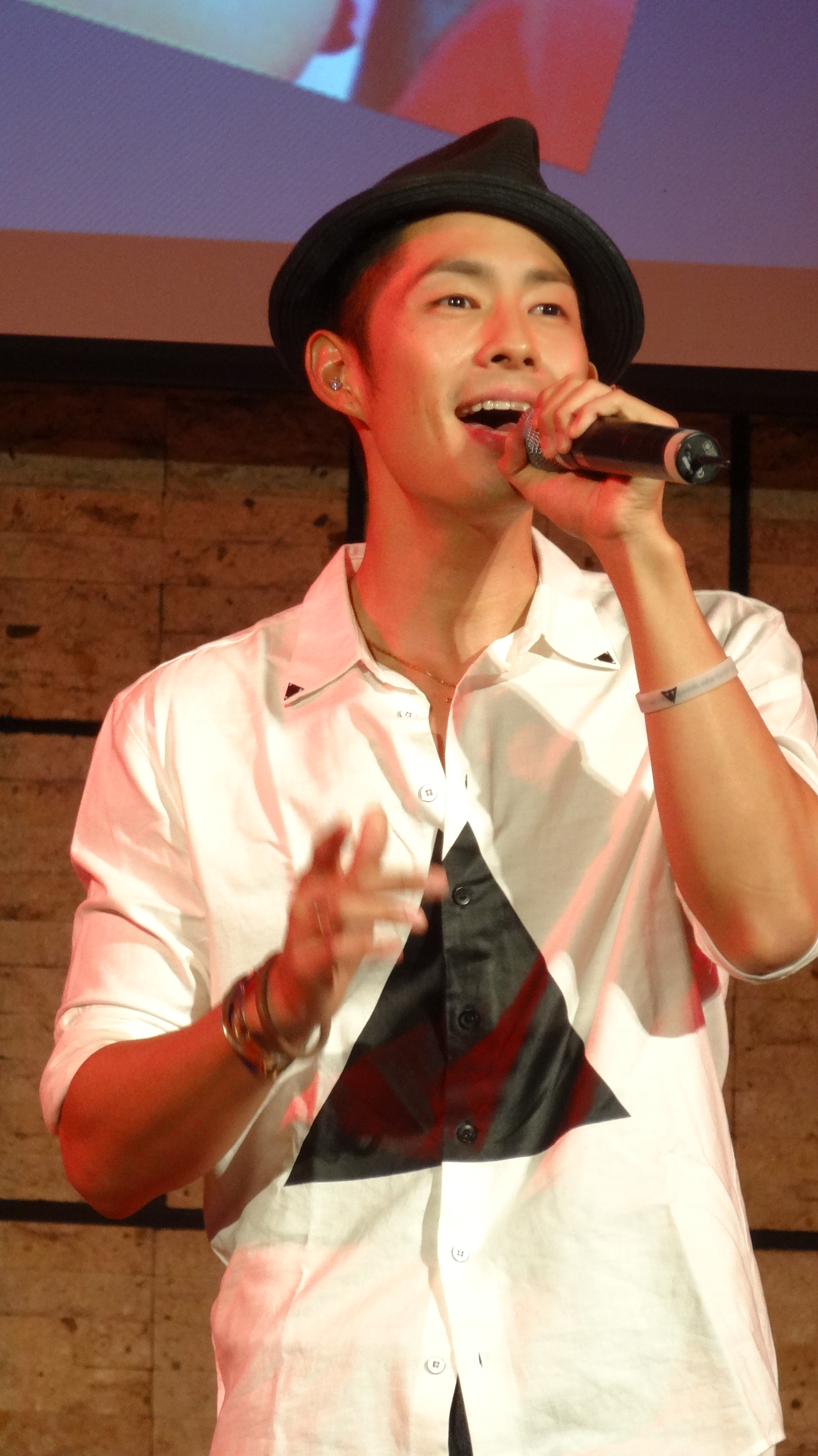
Wu Jianhao from The Amazing Race China 3

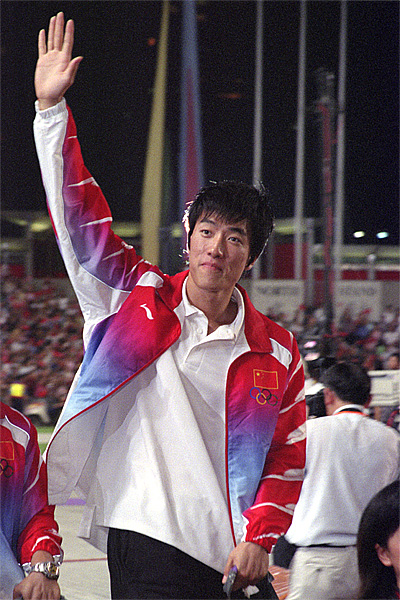
Liu Xiang from The Amazing Race China 3

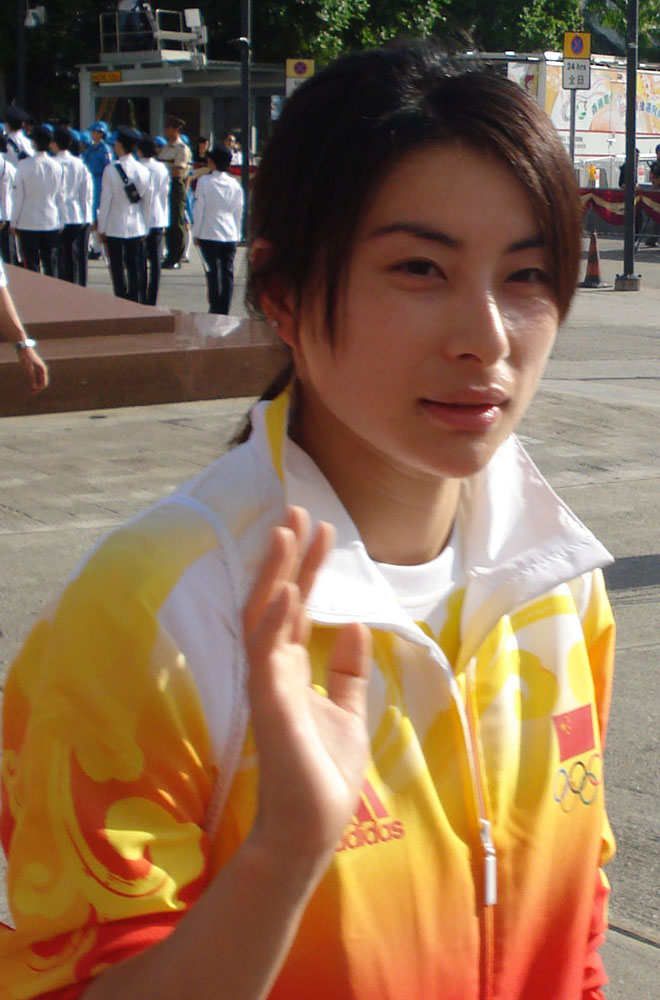
Guo Jingjing from The Amazing Race China 3

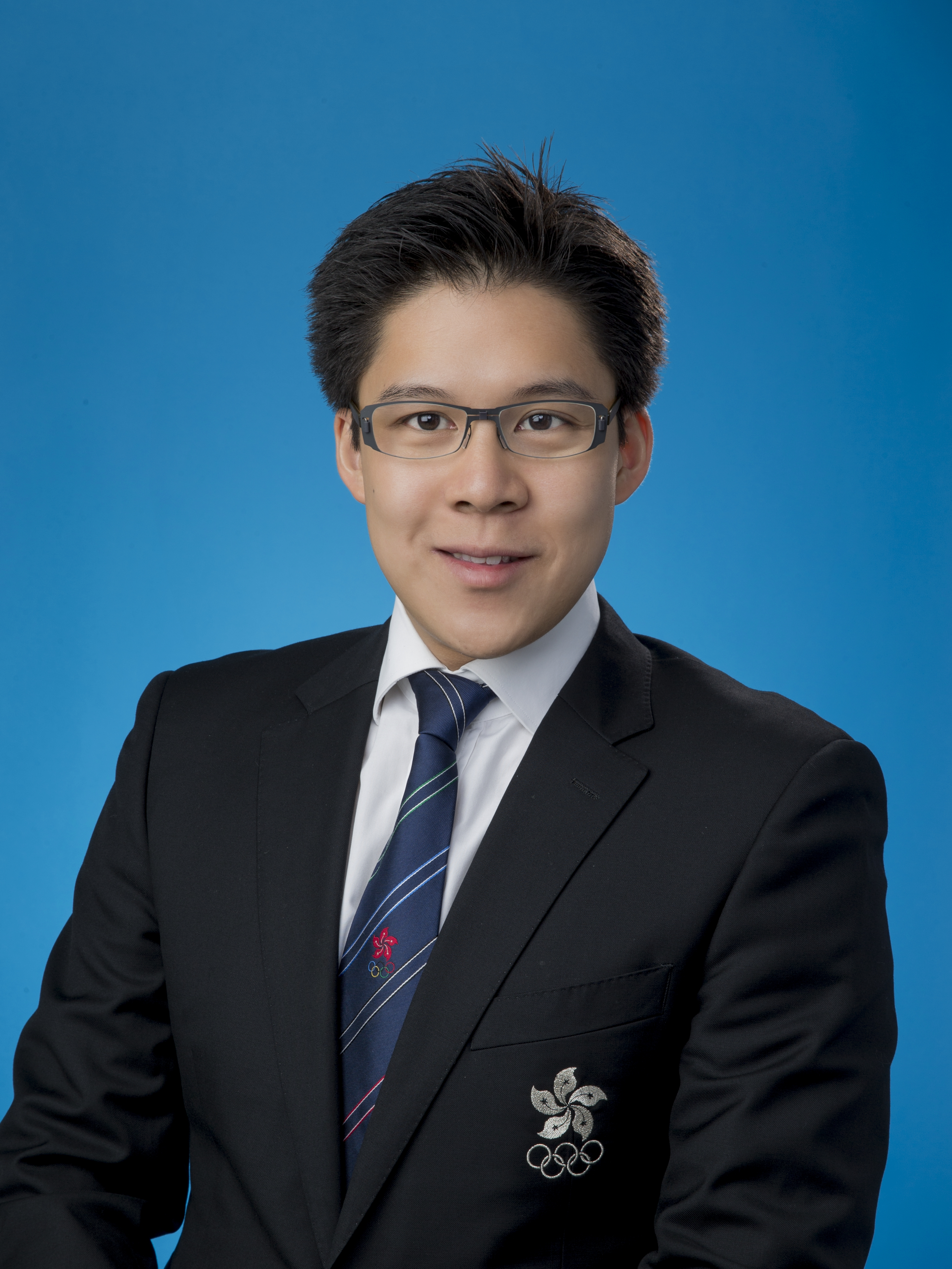
Huo Qigang from The Amazing Race China 3

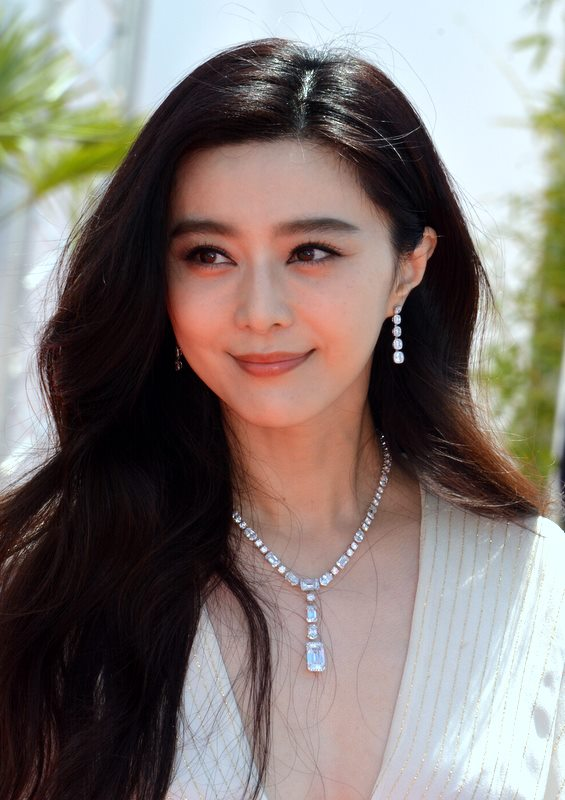
Fan Bingbing from The Amazing Race China 4

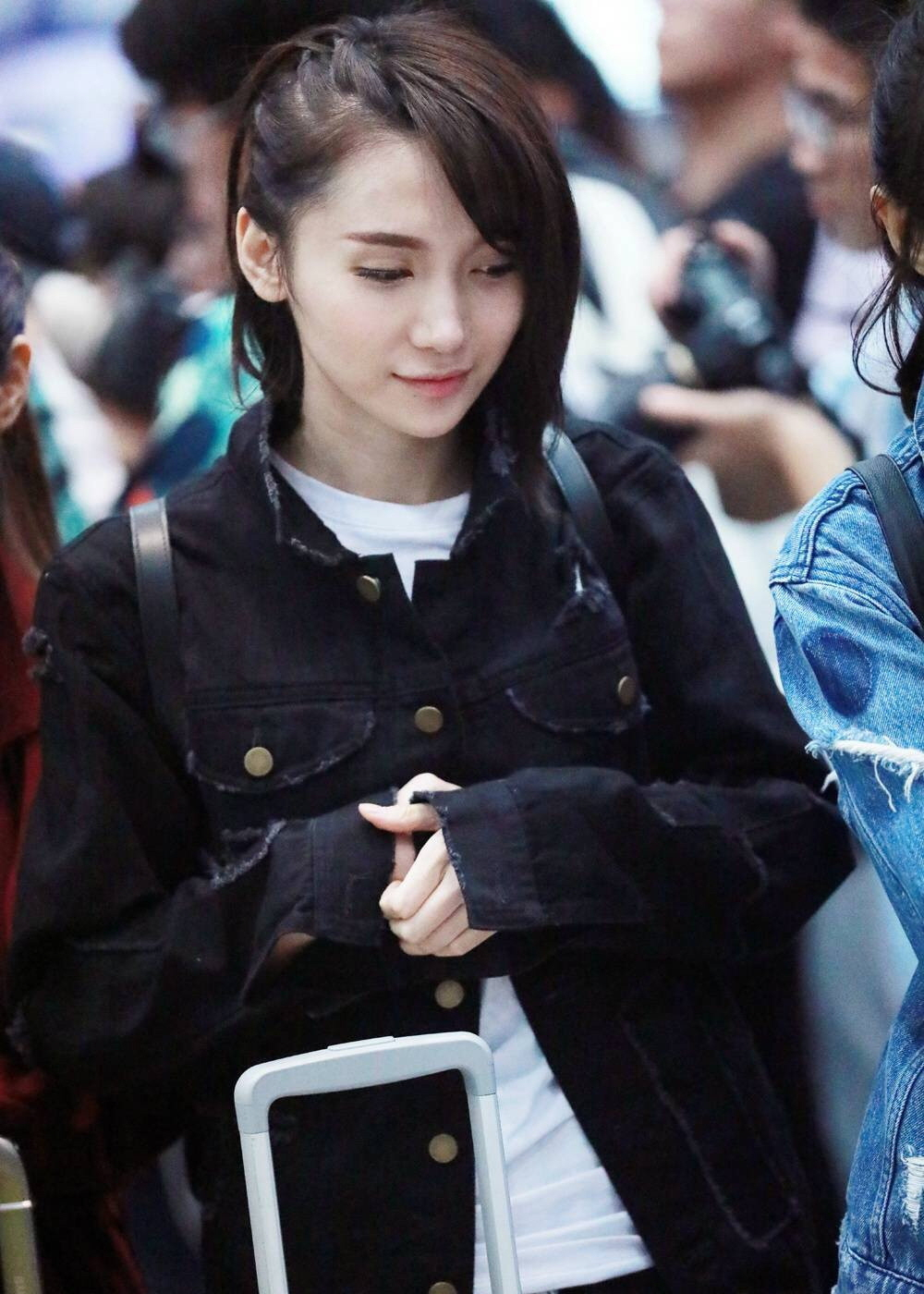
Lu Ting from The Amazing Race China 4

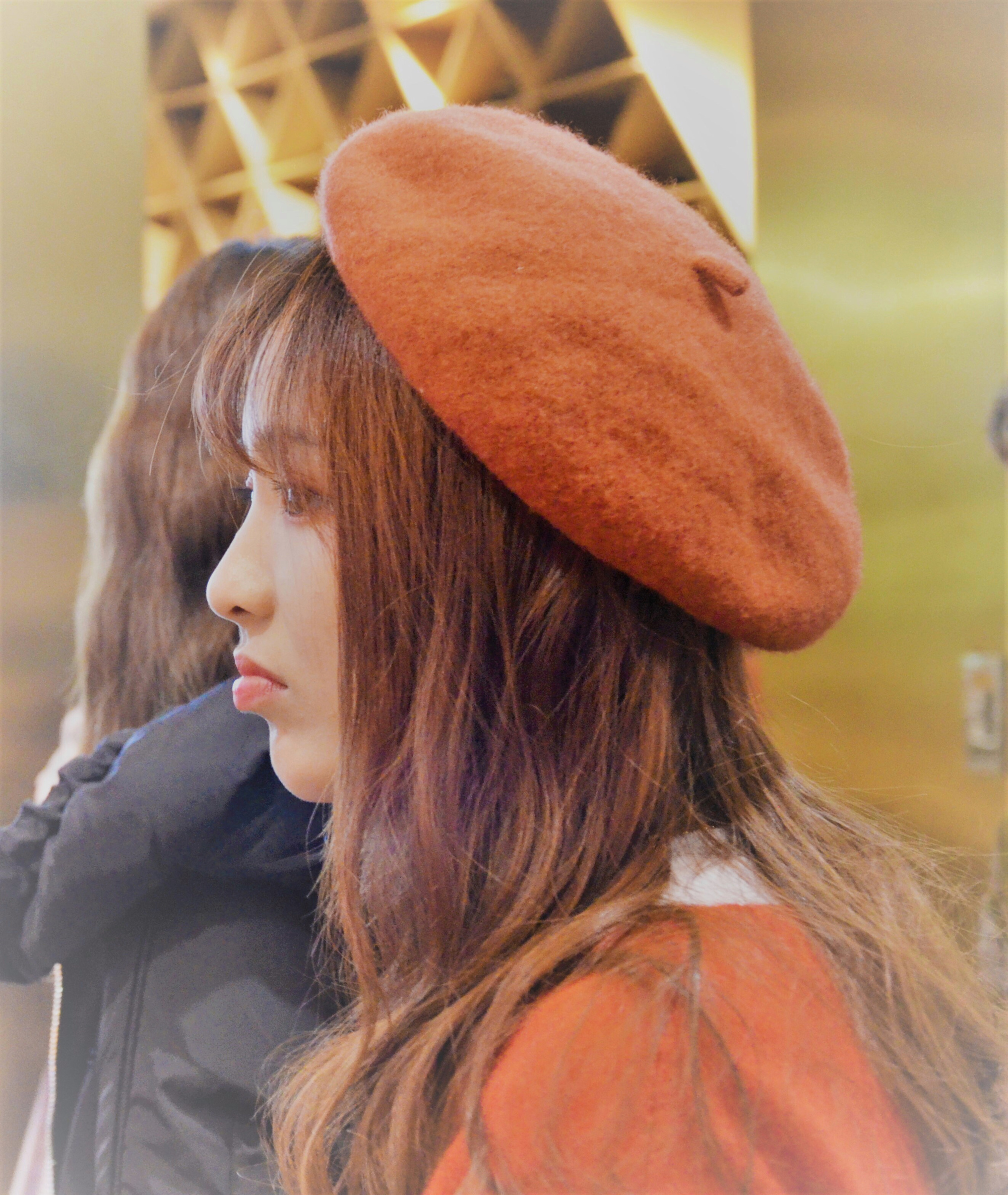
Xuyang Yuzhuo from The Amazing Race China 4

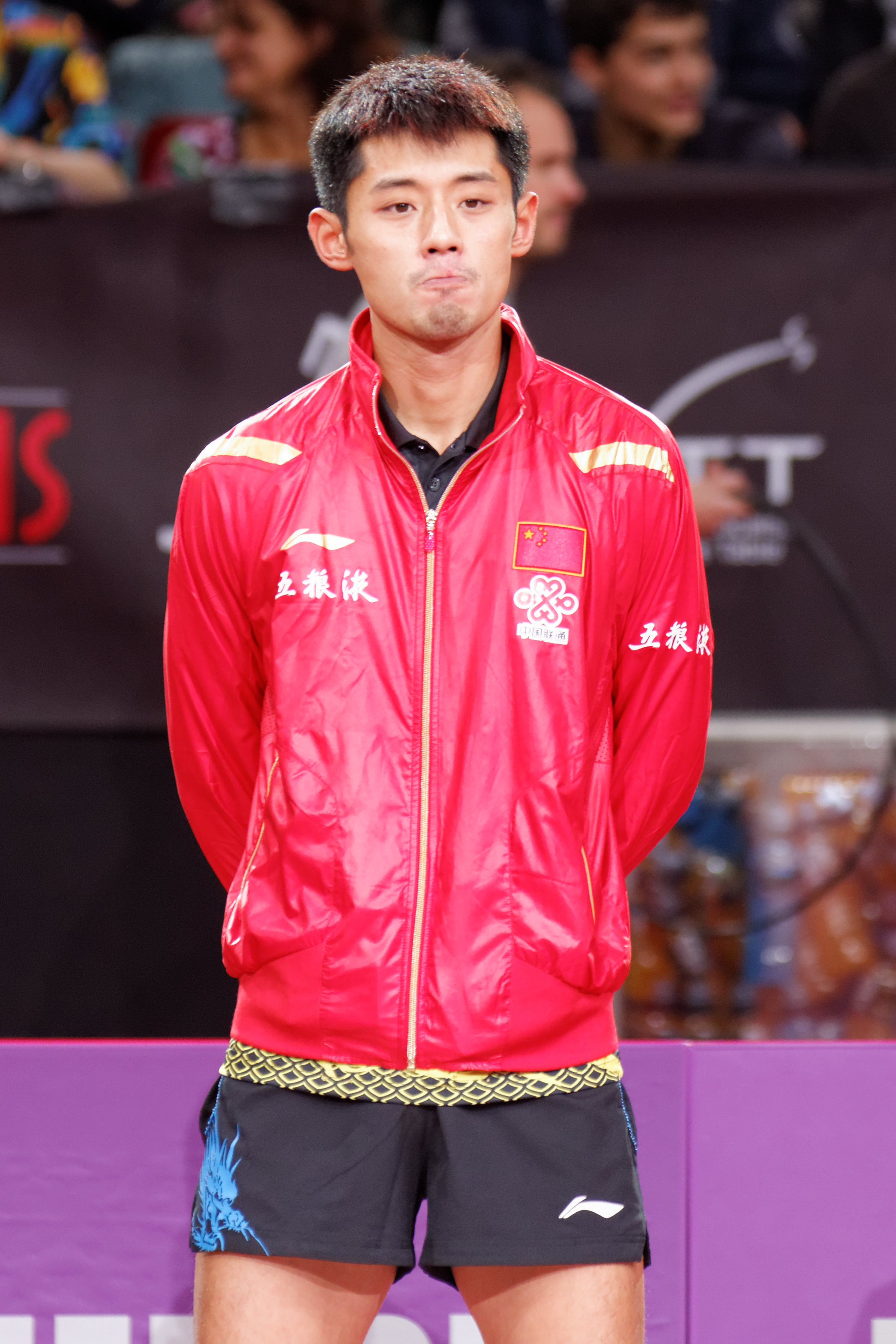
Zhang Jike from The Amazing Race China 4

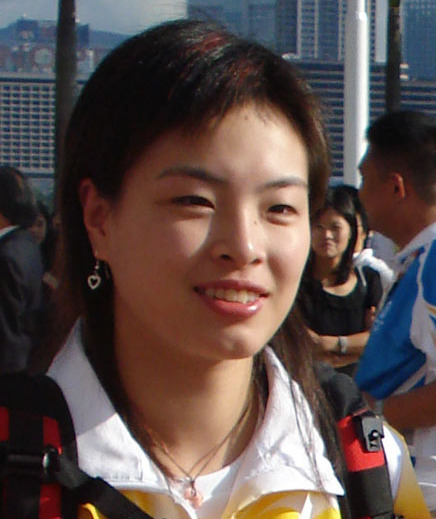
Wu Minxia from The Amazing Race China 4

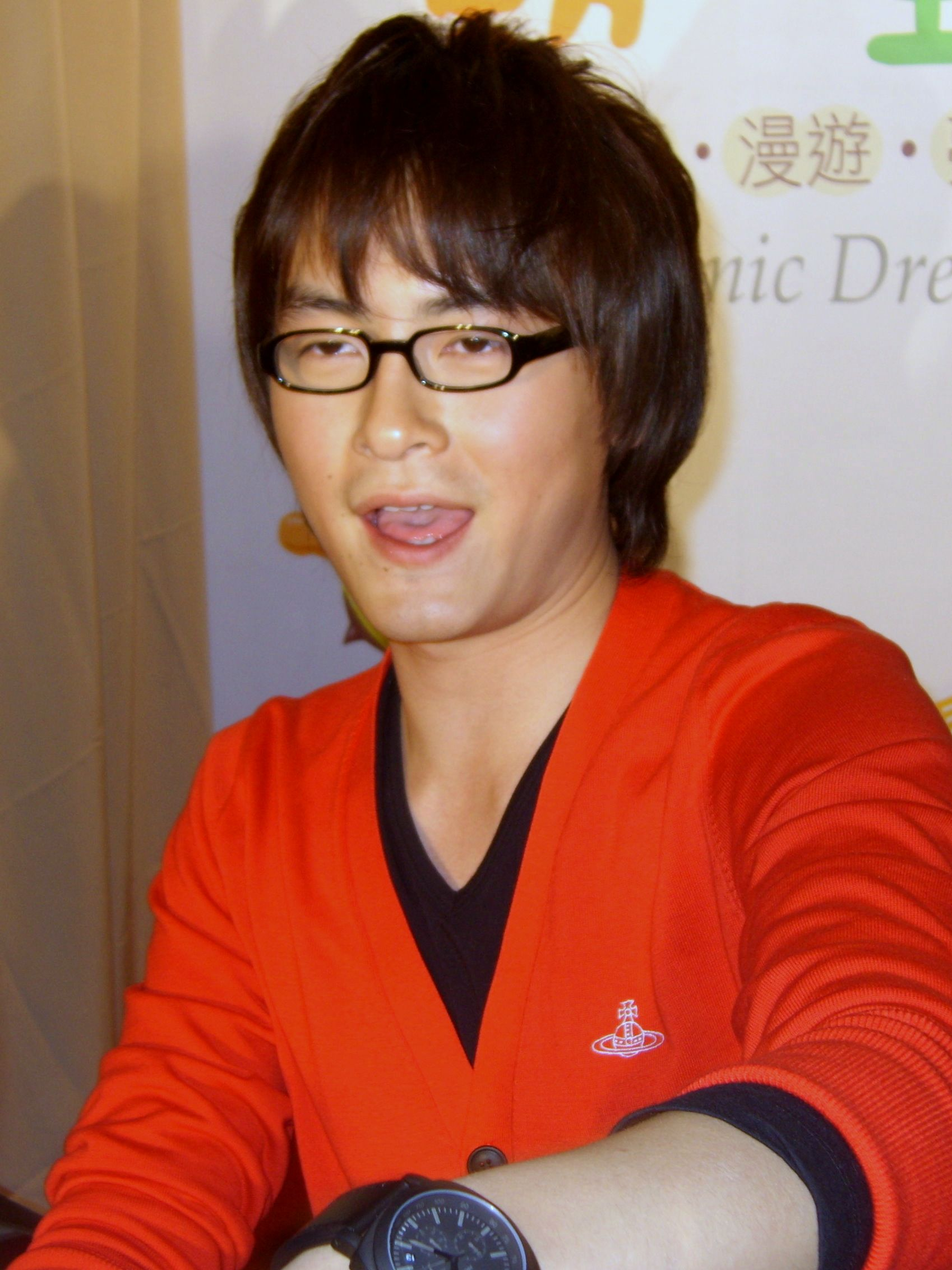
Zheng Yuanchang from The Amazing Race China 4

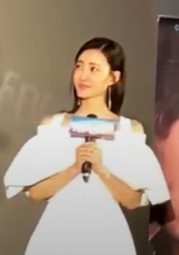
Wang Likun from The Amazing Race China 4

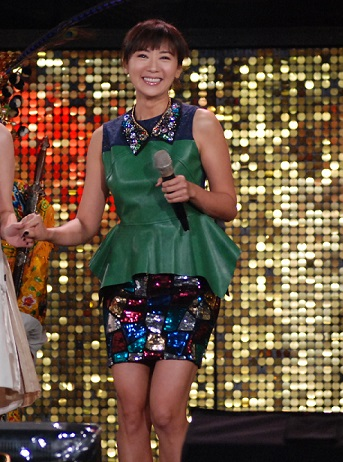
Jia Jingwen from The Amazing Race China 4

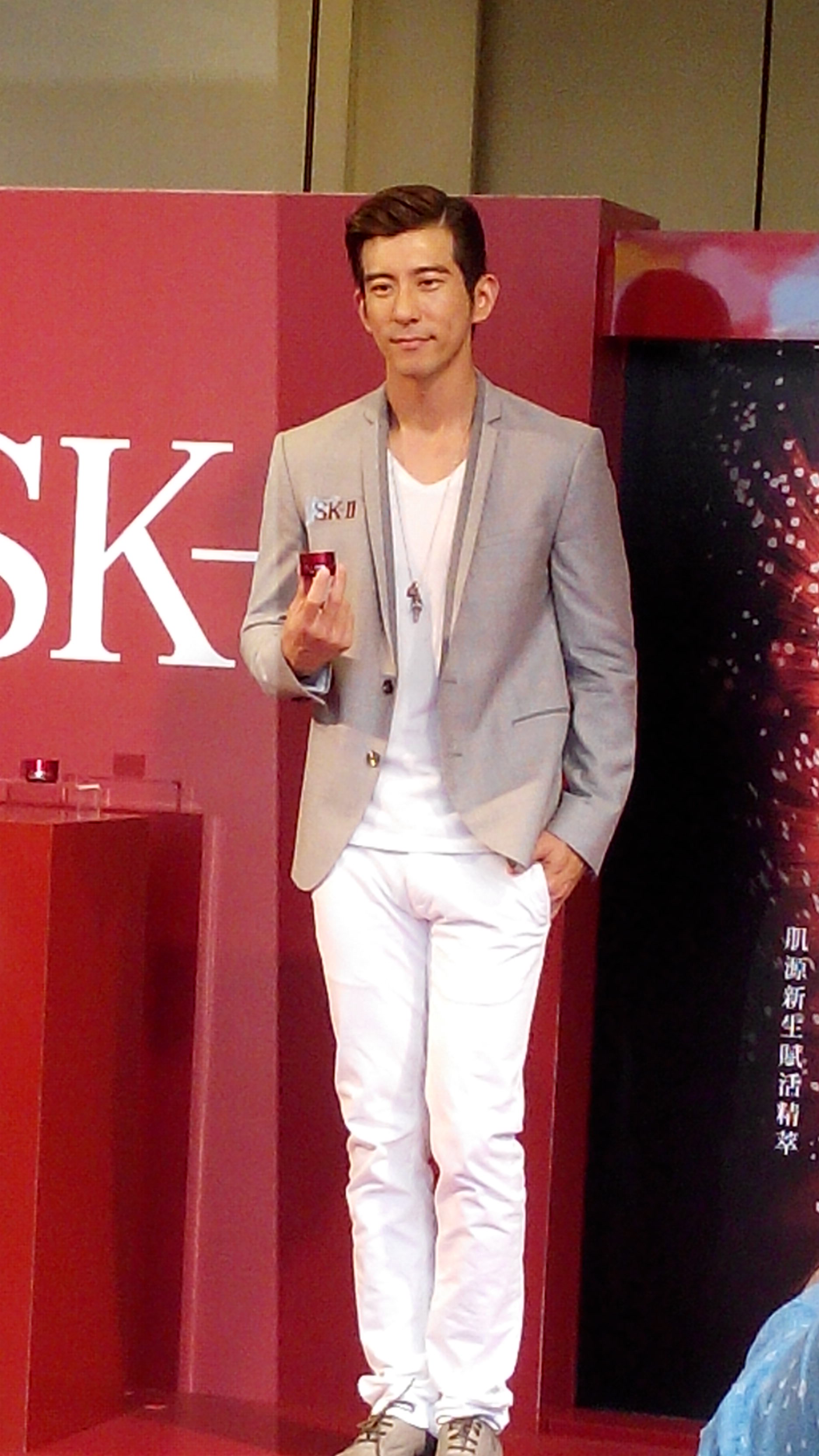
Xiu Jiekai from The Amazing Race China 4
