= The Opposite Me =

- The Opposite Me cover

Studio album 相反的我 by Jing Chang
- Released: 9 July 2010
- Genre: Mandopop
- Language: Mandarin
- Label: Gold Typhoon (Taiwan)

Jing Chang chronology
Unprecedented (2009)	The Opposite Me (2010)	Our Valentine (2011)

The Opposite Me (Chinese: 相反的我; pinyin: xiang fan de wo) is Taiwanese Mandopop artist Jing Chang's second Mandarin studio album. It was released on 9 July 2010 by Gold Typhoon (Taiwan).

It was released with two album cover versions: The Opposite Me (Good Edition) (相反的我 好了版) and The Opposite Me (Bad Edition) (相反的我 壞了版). A further edition The Opposite Me (Loyalty Commemorate Edition) (相反的我 義氣風發冠軍慶功版) was released on 6 September 2010 with bonus track "義氣" (Loyalty) and DVD with six music videos.

== Reception ==
The tracks "相反的我" (The Opposite Me) and "愛情選項" (Love's Option) are listed at number 13 and 32 respectively on Hit Fm Taiwan's Hit Fm Annual Top 100 Singles Chart (Hit-Fm年度百首單曲) for 2010.

The track "壞了" (Broken) won one of the Top 10 Gold Songs at the Hong Kong TVB8 Awards, presented by television station TVB8, in 2010. The album won one of the Hit Albums awards at the Metro Radio Hits Awards presented by Hong Kong radio station Metro Info.

The album was awarded one of the Top 10 Selling Mandarin Albums of the Year at the 2010 IFPI Hong Kong Album Sales Awards, presented by the Hong Kong branch of IFPI.

== Track listing ==
1. "壞了" (Broken)
2. "相反的我" (The Opposite Me)
3. "你是唯一" (The One)
4. "愛情選項" (Love's Option)
5. "不再聯絡" (Cease Contact)
6. "我不愛你了" (Quit Loving You)
7. "只愛你" (You Are The Sole)
8. "正不正" (Feel My Glamour)
9. "簡訊" (Message)
10. "好了" (Almost Healed)

Bonus track - The Opposite Me (Loyalty Commemorate Edition)

1. "義氣" (Always Here For You)
- Titles in quotes are English released versions, not literal translations.

== Music videos ==
1. "壞了"(Broken) MV
2. "相反的我" (The Opposite Me) MV
3. "愛情選項" (Love's Option) MV
4. "你是唯一" (The One) MV
5. "義氣" (Always Here For You) MV
6. "不再聯絡" (Cease Contact) MV
