= Jing Chang =

Taiwanese singer

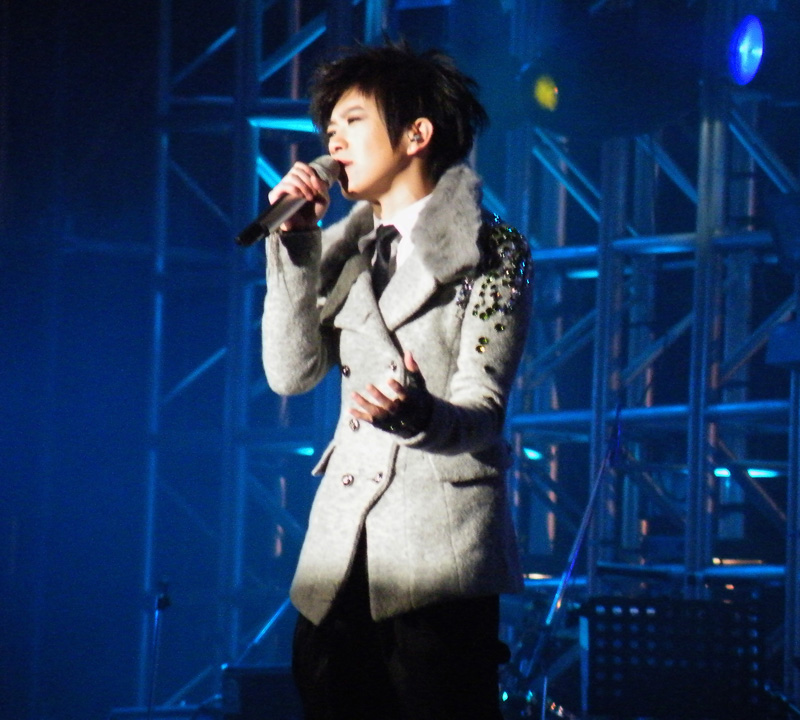
- Chang at Taipei New Year's Eve Party 2011
- Born: 張芸菁 (same pronunciation, different character); 6 September 1983 (age 42); Taipei, Taiwan, Republic of China
- Occupation: Singer-songwriter
- Years active: 2007–present
- Musical career
- Also known as: 阿京, Ah Jing
- Origin: Republic of China, (Taiwan)
- Genres: Rock
- Instruments: Vocals, guitar, drums, piano, Yueqin
- Label: Gold Typhoon
- Website: Gold Typhoon homepage

Jing Chang (Chinese: 張芸京; pinyin: Zhāng Yúnjīng) is a Taiwanese singer.

== Early life ==
Chang was born in Taipei, Taiwan on 6 September 1983. Her birth name is pronounced the same, but written with different characters (張芸菁). She studied graphic design and graduated from Song Shan High School of Commerce. Before entering Super Idol, she was a graphic design artist. She is familiar with many instruments such as guitar, drums, and yueqin (a traditional Chinese musical instrument).

Chang has been noted for her androgynous style and looks. She states that she has not had long hair since preschool. She is also known for her deep voice, quite similar to that of Shirley Owens, who was the lead singer of The Shirelles, and with likes of English pop singer, Dusty Springfield: not only can she handle deep, low notes but she is also able to hit very high notes. She has always been interested in music, and even created her own band called Pensauce (筆醬).

== Career ==
Chang made her debut in 2007 as a singer after winning the first season of Taiwanese singing competition Super Idol and signed to label Gold Typhoon.

In 2008, Chang and her band, Pensauce, released their first EP titled "The Power of Rain" (雨的力量). Later that year, Chang and other top 10 Super Idol performers participated in an album called "Dreams Come True".

Chang released her first album Unprecedented (破天荒) on May 8, 2009; in its first week, it started at #3 on local music charts, but then rose to #1. Her album grew popular very quickly resulting in her rise to fame. The album was so successful that a limited edition was made, this album not only included her 10 songs but also included 3 music videos and a thank you card written by Chang. She also participated in a group song with various artists on the 10th anniversary of the 1999 Jiji earthquake called "Let love turn the whole universe" (讓愛轉動整個宇宙).

In March 2010, Chang and Kevin Lin, one of the judges of Super Idol, sang a duet called "When Did We Start to Forget" (怎麼開始忘了). In July 2010, she released her second studio album The Opposite Me, of which the title track was composed by Chang. It and "愛情選項" are listed at number 13 and 32 respectively on Hit Fm Taiwan's Hit Fm Annual Top 100 Singles Chart (Hit-Fm年度百首單曲) for 2010.

Chang and members of the Taiwanese boy band Lollipop collaborated and released a single, "義氣", which she also composed herself. That song consists of rapping and hitting quite a number of high notes. In the music video, she had to dance, which she has never done before, and also known as one of her few weaknesses.

In 2011, Chang released a new EP for the Valentine's Day. It contains Jing's latest single, the love song "Lovers Knot" as well as two extra tracks. It was released with an organizer for February 2011-January 2012, featuring hand-drawn illustrations and photos of Chang.

== Discography ==
Studio albums
#	English Title	Chinese Title	Released	Label
1st	Unprecedented	破天荒	8 May 2009	Gold Typhoon
2nd	The Opposite Me	相反的我	9 July 2010	Gold Typhoon
3rd	Little Girl	小女孩	22 September 2012	Gold Typhoon

Extended play (EP)
#	English Title	Chinese Title	Released	Label
1st	Our Valentine	我要我們情人結	14 February 2011	Gold Typhoon

== Books ==
In 2009, Chang traveled to Japan and wrote a book called 一個人的東京,張芸京361°. It relayed her journey in Japan and articles and stories written by her, including anecdotes such as a three-year-old boy proposing marriage to her.

== Awards ==
Hong Kong TVB8 Awards
Year	Category	Nomination	Result	Ref.
2009	Best New Artist (Gold)	Jing Chang	Won	
2010	Top 10 Gold Songs	"壞了" (Broken) from The Opposite Me	Won	
2010	Most Popular Female Artist (China)	Jing Chang	Won	

Metro Radio Mandarin Music Awards
Year	Category	Nomination	Result	Ref.
2009	Outstanding Newcomer (新勢力歌手)	Jing Chang	Won	
2009	Best Improved Singer (力躍進歌手)	Jing Chang	Won	
2010	Songs of the Year	"怎麽開始忘了" (How to Forget) with Kevin Lin (林隆璇)	Won	
2010	Songs of the Year	"讓我照顧你" (Let Me Look After You)	Won	
2010	Excellent Performance Award (優秀演繹獎)	Jing Chang	Won	

Metro Radio Hits Awards
Year	Category	Nomination	Result	Ref.
2009	Mandarin Hit Songs	"黑裙子" (Black Dress)	Won	
2009	Most Popular Newcomer (by popular vote)	Jing Chang	Won	
2010	Hit Albums	The Opposite Me (相反的我)	Won	
2010	Mandarin Singer	Jing Chang	Won	

2008

- 2008 - Champion of Super Idol 1st Season
- 2008 - Yahoo! Taiwan Most Searched Keyword Chart #8

20090524 Jing Chang's album [Unprecedented] tops 8 charts

- #1 on G-Music Mandarin Chart
- #1 on G-Music Combo Chart
- #1 on Five Music Record Sales Chart (2 charts in all)
- #1 on Enome Top Ringtones Chart
- #1 on KKBOX MV Charts
- #1 on Channel [V] Music Charts
- #1 on Enome Music Channel
- #1 on Yahoo! Search (8 #1's in a row after 2 weeks album release)

2009 Chengdu Music Hits

- Newcomer with Most Potential
- Most Popular Artist Online

20091106 Singapore HIT Awards

- Outstanding Newcomer Award

2009 TPBS’ China Original Melodies Awards

- Taiwan/HK Outstanding Newcomer Gold Award

2009 Yahoo! Taiwan Asia Buzz Awards

- Most Popular Female Artiste
- Best Female Singer

2010 MY Astro Music Awards (Malaysia)

- Newcomer with Most Potential

2010 KKBOX Awards Ceremony

- Newcomer of the Year
- Top 100 Songs of the Year
- #35 - Pian Ai/Preference
- #50 - Black Dress
- Top 100 Albums of the Year
- #20 Unprecedented

Baidu Hot Point 2009 Awards Ceremony

- "Pian Ai"/Preference #7 Top 10 Golden Melodies

2010 TTV's Red vs. White Superstar Showdown

- Cpop Top 10 Artists Award

Canada's Fairchild Radio HiT Cpop Chart

- Best Female Newcomer (Mandarin)

Sprite Awards

- Best Newcomer (Taiwan/HK)
- Most Popular TV Drama Golden Melody

Guangzhou Peng Peng Music Awards 2009

- Best Newcomer/Songwriter
- Best Newcomer (Taiwan/HK)

Yahoo!搜尋人氣大獎2010

- Best International singer
- Best manderin song(壞了)
