= Singer (TV series) =

Chinese television programme

- I Am a Singer logo (Chinese)
- Also known as: I Am a Singer (我是歌手; Wǒ Shì Gēshǒu) (Season 1-4); Singer (歌手; Gēshǒu) (Season 5-7, 9-11); Singer: Year of the Hits (歌手:当打之年; Gēshǒu: Dāngdǎ zhī Nián) (Season 8)
- Presented by: He Jiong (Seasons 1-2 Finals, Season 4–8 Finals,Season 9-11); Wang Han (Seasons 1–3 Finals); Shen Mengchen (Biennial Concert); Lidia Liu (Season 6–8; backstage); Season 1 Yu Quan (Main competition); Sha Baoliang (Finals); Season 2 Phil Chang Yu (Main competition); Liao Fan (Breakouts); Season 3 Leo Ku (Main competition; Episodes 1–7); Sun Nan (Main competition; Episodes 8–11 and Breakout); Season 4 Hacken Lee (Main competition); Kim Ji-mun, Su Yunying, Chao Chuan, Shin, Daichin Tana, Guan Zhe, Elvis Wang, Wang Yang, Joey Yung, Jeff Chang (Breakouts); Season 6 Angela Chang (Main competition); Season 7 Wu Tsing-fong (Main competition); Hong Tao (Pre-challenge Face-off); Season 8 Jam Hsiao (Episodes 1–2); Eliza Liang (Episodes 3–10 and Breakout); Season 9, 10; Hu Hai Quan (Main competition); Season 11; Na Ying (Main competition)
- Judges: 500-member studio audience
- Theme music composer: Kubert Leung
- Country of origin: China
- Original language: Standard Chinese
- No. of seasons: 11
- No. of episodes: 135

Production
- Executive producer: Hong Tao
- Production location: Chang Sha
- Running time: 2 hour 10–20 minutes

Original release
- Network: HBS: Hunan Television
- Release: January 18, 2013 – present

Related
- Korea: I Am a Singer

Singer (Chinese: 歌手; pinyin: Gēshǒu), previously known as I Am a Singer (Chinese: 我是歌手; pinyin: Wǒ Shì Gēshǒu), is a Chinese singing competition show broadcast on Hunan Television. It is based on the Korean show I Am a Singer. The competition is open to well-known professional singers worldwide, and features a rotating cast of usually seven singers performing each week in front of a 500-member audience. The votes cast from the audience are the sole determinant for the results and the singer who receives the fewest votes is eliminated, with a new singer substituted in their place. The first season featured 12 contestants, but later increased to as many as 22 due to twists and competition rules added in later seasons. The inaugural series was first taped on 10 January 2013 and premiered on 18 January 2013.

After four seasons under the name of I Am a Singer, in 2017, the show was rebranded as Singer (Chinese: 歌手; pinyin: Gēshǒu), but retained the same competition format. The eighth season, entitled Singer 2020, or Singer: Year of the Hits (Chinese: 歌手:当打之年; pinyin: Gēshǒu: Dāngdǎ zhī Nián), began taping on 3 January 2020; the season was initially slated for a premiere on 10 January 2020, but was postponed twice; the season was first announced to premiere on 31 January 2020, but was again postponed to 7 February 2020 because of the COVID-19 pandemic that occurred prior to the intended premiere date. The series finale aired on 24 April 2020.

On 22 September 2020, the showrunner Hong Tao announced that Singer would cease production after eight seasons. However, in 2023, Mango TV decided to revive the series, allowing a ninth season to premiere on May 10, 2024 after a four-year hiatus.

== Competition rules ==
Each round of I Am a Singer has seven singers (or eight in some weeks) performing for a 500-member studio audience each week, who decide the results for the singers. The order that they perform is determined through ballot or based on prior performances, depending on the week. Each audience member casts a vote for the top three singers, and these votes are tabulated to determine each singer's placement for the night. Since season 7, with the implementation of Electronic voting (which was conducted thrice throughout the show), each score accounts toward 50% of the final results.

Each season of I Am a Singer is divided into four or five rounds (first 10 or 11 weeks), which consist of usually non-elimination "Qualifiers" and "Knockouts" (renamed to "Ranking" and "Revelation" rounds from Season 9, respectively). Votes are accumulative on both rounds and the singer receiving a lower count of votes at the end of the Knockout round is eliminated. Eliminated singers are entitled to a Returning Performance on the next show and a chance to return to the competition via the Breakout Round, though eliminations may also be cancelled if another singer chooses to withdraw from the competition, or if any contestant is given a bye due to health conditions. At the end of each round, a new singer takes the place of the eliminated/withdrawn singer and the competition cycle repeats until the final Knockout round was completed. At the end of the episode a table is usually shown to indicate the rankings.

As part of the "2+1" format introduced in the third season, the "Challenge" round follows each Knockout round. A new singer (dubbed a "Challenger") is substituted for an eliminated singer during the start of the round, and given a challenge in which they are required to beat a majority of the singers (finishing within top four or better) or face elimination; if the challenger succeeds, any incumbent singers are eligible for elimination, which is decided on which singers received a lower count of votes for this round alone (votes cast for the Challenge round are factored independently of combined votes from the Qualifier/Knockouts). Season 5 replaced Qualifiers with Challenge rounds immediately after the first Knockout round to accommodate two substitute singers coming to the competition (one of which was a challenger). Season 6 temporarily revised the format, where the challenger enters the competition during the Knockouts and had to avoid last place on their first week in addition to finishing in the top four on the second week (in a combination of both Knockout and Challenge rounds); failing either challenge eliminated the singer immediately. However, in Season 7, due to the season-exclusive Pre-Challenge Face-off (see twists below), the challenge round format was reverted to the season 3 to 5 format, with the challenger winning the face-off immediately facing the Challenge round. The Challenge round was absent in Season 8, instead replacing with another variant round (see Twists below).

"Breakout" round follows after the last Knockout round, which featured previously eliminated singers (except withdrawn singers) performing for a chance to return to the game and take part in the finals. During the inaugural season, Breakout rounds was called "Revival" and all remaining singers were exempt from this round, leaving eliminated singers to compete for the only place in the Semi-Finals. Beginning in the second season, the rules were modified for the remaining singers based on the entry status: initial singers (singers who entered the competition on week 1) were exempt from the Breakout rounds while other singers were required to participate the Breakout round to vie for the number of places, which was determined by how many initial singers were exempt, to complete the seven-singer lineup (with the exception of season 5 as the number of finalists briefly increased to ten). The outcome was decided on which singers received a higher count of votes, and the singers who were successful on the "Breakouts" were qualified (along with exempted singers) in the Finals. Since Season 6, additional twists were also featured where singers receiving a lower count of votes in a prior voting immediately losing the Breakout regardless of the outcome. Since Season 7, only contestants that were given full contestant status were eligible to participate in the Breakouts, making the first season not all eliminated singers (outside withdrawn singers) were eligible.

The last stage of the competition, the Finals, was usually divided into Semi-Finals and the live-broadcast Grand Finals, held on two separate nights. The finalists had to sing from two to three songs (one duet and one or two solo performances), with audience voting for their performances in-between each round. For the first two seasons, the scores were weighted in favor of the final performance (30%–30%–40%), but subsequent seasons used the sum of the votes (or since Season 6, only the final round votes) cast to determine the winner of the season.

=== Twists ===
==== Pot Luck ====
The viewing audience voted online for "Pot Luck" songs featured during episode 8 of Season 1. Meanwhile, each singer chose three songs which he or she did not want to sing, and if the audience selected their song, the contestant may choose another. Pot Luck did not return after Season 2.

==== Returning performances ====
Returning performances are exhibition performances which showcased the singers who were eliminated the previous week. Since Season 2, singers who voluntarily withdrew from the competition without performing have not been eligible for Returning performances. Returning performances did not appear on season 8 due to health and safety matters relating to the ongoing COVID-19 pandemic.

==== Biennial concert ====
Between seasons 2 and 6, a live-telecast Biennial Concert was held a week after the final. Similar to Returning performance, the Biennial concert showcase the best singers of the season plus selected singers from former seasons.

==== Tiebreakers ====
If the lowest combined scores were tied after an elimination round, eliminations were postponed to the following show; the tie is resolved based on the singer's placement in the next show, regardless of overall placement. Eliminations (if applicable) went ahead as normal. The first (and only) tiebreaker happened in Season 4, when two singers were tied for seventh place during the first elimination round.

==== Hosting Roles ====
Hosting Roles were first introduced in Season 1, where singers may be elected to be the show's host in addition to contesting at the same time, with the role managed by his or her manager or music partner. The role would be vacated once the singer was eliminated, and would be replaced by another singer. Hosting roles were absent in Season 5, as well as in the finals.

==== Singer Voting ====
Singer voting was introduced in Season 3 and removed in Season 6. Following the performances the singers could make predictions on which three singers would get the most audience votes. Guessing correctly could entitle a singer to a small advantage in the next round. These predictions were not tabulated into the final results.

==== I Am a Singer – Who Will Challenge ====
An online spin-off, I Am a Singer – Who Will Challenge, was produced during Season 4. The online viewing audience would cast votes for potential contestants of the broadcast show.

==== Pre-audience Voting ====
Pre-audience Voting was introduced in Season 6 as a twist on Singer Voting. Midway through the program, when only four singers had performed, the audience members were asked to make early predictions (one vote for electronic voting) on which three singers would receive the most votes after the remaining performances of that episode. Like Singer Voting, Pre-audience Voting does not count towards the tally and has no impact onto the outcome of the competition (with one exception). Due to the implementation of electronic voting which allowed scores to be factored, the Pre-audience Voting was removed in Season 7.

==== National's Recommended Singer ====
An online spin-off, titled National's Recommended Singer was held during Season 7. On certain time periods throughout the season, potential singers can audition and must be able to turn up for the show's arrangements set by the producers. Qualified singers will then face a public vote to select a singer who will face off against a Challenger during the Knockouts in a Pre-Challenge Face-off (not broadcast on television). Unlike regular Challengers, results were done separately from other contestants (this vote was separate from the final result); the singer who lost the face-off will be eliminated along with the ineligibility to participate in the Breakouts, similar to withdrawn singers.

==== Surprise Challenge / Revelation Round ====
Introduced as a variant of Challenge rounds in Season 8, at the start of each elimination round, three new singers (two on the final elimination round) were to compete along with the current lineup of singers, but not necessarily on the same episode. While during a performance, one Challenger may choose a current singer to compete in a face-off by simply pulling the lever, and will perform immediately after the contestant, but any current contestants who were informed on the upcoming performance was not known until the end of the previous performance. After both performances, an electronic vote will conduct which determine whether the challenger is successful in the Surprise challenge, which was announced at the end of the show. Unlike the regular Challenge round, challengers are not guaranteed as contestants regardless of outcome, but if there is at least one successful challenge, one current singer with the fewest accumulated votes will be eliminated after the current elimination round, while successful challengers are also given eligibility to participate in the Breakouts. Similar twists also apply during Breakout and Grand Finals as part of intermediate eliminations, with losing singers being eliminated from the competition.

A variant of the Surprise challenge was also used in Season 9 during the Revelation round; however, successful challengers would be given contestant status immediately, and the number of successes determine the eliminations for the singers each week, for up to two.

==== Attack Round ====
Also introduced in Season 9, occurring after the Revelation round, one new singer will also enter the competition and would challenge against one singer who believe that they could win the duel. The current lineup would secretly vote one singer to determine the lineup (if there is a tie between multiple singers, judge's votes will break the tie). Like in Surprise Challenge and Challenge Rounds, if the attacking singer won the duel, the bottom ranked singer may face elimination.

== Series overview ==
Season	Premiere Date	Finale Date	No. of contestants	No. of episodes	Winner	Runner-up	Third place	Other Finalists (Note: Singers are listed in order of finish, or alphabetically if they were not given any ranking (starting from second round finalists).)	Comments
1	18 January 2013	12 April 2013	12	13	Yu Quan	Terry Lin	Not Revealed	Huang Qishan Winnie Hsin; Julia Peng; Aska Yang; Zhou Xiao'ou	Only season to feature Pot Luck.
2	3 January 2014	11 April 2014	12	14	Han Lei	G.E.M.	Not Revealed	Phil Chang; Gary Chaw; Shila Amzah; Jason Zhang; Bibi Zhou	Introduced new Breakout round format and Biennial Concert.
3	2 January 2015	3 April 2015	13	14	Han Hong	Li Jian	The One	A-Lin; Tiger Hu; Sitar Tan; Sun Nan	Introduced Contestant Hosting roles, Challenge Rounds and Singer Voting, and replaced weighted finals percentage with combined votes.
4	15 January 2016	8 April 2016	14	14	Coco Lee	Jeff Chang	Hwang Chi Yeul	LaLa Hsu; Lao Lang; Hacken Lee; Joey Yung; Elvis Wang	First season with eight initial singers, and an online spin-off I Am a Singer – Who Will Challenge.
5	21 January 2017	22 April 2017	16 (Note: Including four returning singers from the first three seasons.)	14	Sandy Lam	Dimash Kudaibergen	Lion	Li Jian; Terry Lin; Diamond Zhang; Tia Ray; Jason Zhang	Series renamed to Singer; First season to feature returning singers from previous seasons, and increased number of finalists.
6	12 January 2018	20 April 2018	14	14	Jessie J	Hua Chenyu	Wang Feng	Tengger; Angela Chang; Henry Huo; James Li; KZ Tandingan	Only season to feature modifications of Challenge round lasting two shows, Pre-audience Voting, and first season to feature midway eliminations in Breakout round.
7	11 January 2019	12 April 2019	17 (Note: The total number of contestants include three National's Recommended Singers, and losers of Pre-Challenge Face-off (which singers were ineligible for Breakouts).) (Note: One more singer was added impromptu due to a contestant injury before the final elimination round of the competition.)	14	Liu Huan	Wu Tsing-fong	Super-Vocal finalists	Yang Kun; Chyi Yu; Polina Gagarina Gong Linna	Introduced Electronic voting feature, online spin-off National's Recommended Singer, and online voting (semi-finals only).
8	7 February 2020	24 April 2020	21 (Note: Including four returning singers from seasons four to six.) (Note: The total number of contestants include 14 contestants taking part as "Surprise Challengers" status.)	12	Hua Chenyu	Tia Ray	Jam Hsiao	Jike Junyi; LaLa Hsu; Misia; Charlie Zhou	Subtitled Singer: Year of the Hits; Second season to feature returning contestants; first season to feature variant to Challenge round (Surprise Challenge); First season without Return Performances
9	10 May 2024	2 August 2024	23	13	Na Ying	Tan Weiwei	Sun Nan	Faouzia Ouihya; Silence Wang; Chanté Moore; Hailai Ahmu	Third season to feature returning contestants; featured Revelation and Attack rounds
10	16 May 2025	8 August 2025	24	14	Chen Chusheng	Mickey Guyton	Shan Yichun	Jess Lee Beni Grace Kinstler A-Lin	Fourth season to feature returning contestants
11	22 May 2026	14 August 2026	19	12	Tiger Hu	Chyi Yu	Vinida Weng		Fifth season to feature returning contestants

=== Music Partners ===
Singer introduces music partners or managers assigned with participating singers during the course of the competition, with a role to advise singers on the songs along with their contestant's roles such as hosting. When a singer is eliminated from the competition, their music advisor is consequently eliminated.

Unless otherwise stated, the table only reflects any music partners that were assigned for the singers and its placements (the table do not reflect any partners and managers that were temporarily assigned):

Key:

Won the season
Placed second in the season
Placed third in the season
Was a finalist
Withdrew in the season
Non-Contestant

Music partner	Season										
Music partner	1	2	3	4	5	6	7	8	9	10	11
Aray Aydarhan					Dimash Kudaibergen						
Chen Ruo Tong										A-Lin	
Chen Ye Sheng								Misia (Note: Huang Tingting served as the temporary manager on Week 1)		Beni	
David							Polina Gagarina				
Du Haitao	Huang Qishan	Wei Wei									
Huang Ya Jing										Alexia Evellyn	
Jeffery G		Shila Amzah			Teresa Carpio	Jessie J	Chyi Yu	Lexie Liu (Note: G served as a manager for participating Surprise Challengers.)			
Neil Gao							Super-Vocal finalists				
Enti Jin								Charlie Zhou (Note: Jin was absent on Week 5 and Cai Chenyu filed on his absence.)			
Mandy Jin					Zhao Lei (Note: Eligible for Breakouts but did not participate)	Li Xiaodong				Terry Lin	
KK	Winnie Hsin										
Kuo Tao							Wu Tsing-fong	Huang Xiaoyun	Yellow Huang		
Leo Li				LaLa Hsu		GAI	Kristian Kostov	LaLa Hsu	Rainie Yang	GAI	
Li Haofei							ANU				
Li Jinye									Faouzia Ouhiya		
Li Rui	Chyi Chin	Han Lei	Sun Nan	Chao Chuan	Li Jian	Wang Feng	Liu Huan				
Li Weijia	Yu Quan		Jane Zhang (Note: Eligible for Breakouts but did not participate)	Hacken Lee	Jason Zhang	Hua Chenyu	Yang Kun	Hua Chenyu			
Liu Ye									Hailai Ahmu		
Belinda Eliza Liang		Power Station	Li Ronghao	Lao Lang	Terry Lin	Tengger	Chen Chusheng	Jam Hsiao (Note: Served as host starting Week 3.)			
Lidia		G.E.M.									
Low Xinran							Escape Plan				
Peng Qing							Angela Hui				
Qi Sijun						Sam Lee					
Since Seah							Faith Yang				
Ava Shen						Angela Chang			Sun Nan		
Shen Ling	Zhou Xiao'ou	Jason Zhang	A-Lin	Coco Lee	Sandy Lam			Geng Sihan			
Shen Mengchen	Terry Lin	Victor Wong	Li Jian	Jeff Chang	Lion	Yisa Yu		Summer Jike			
Aaron Sun				Kim Ji Mun	Tia Ray		Gong Linna				
Cindy Sun				Shin				Life Journey			
Ma Xuan									Silence Wang	Mars Radio	
Oscar Sun		Bibi Zhou			Diamond Zhang						
Jackie Tam			Han Hong			KZ Tandingan					
Tanas			The One								
Tan Wei										Jess Lee	
Yu Meiren						Henry Huo					
Tian Yuan	Aska Yang	Gary Chaw	Kit Chan								
Wang Qiao	Chen Ming	Luo Qi (Note: Replaced by Man Wenjun on Week 7 after Luo's withdrawal)	Leo Ku	Su Yunying	Julia Peng	James Li	Zhang Xin	Tia Ray			
Rolling Wang			Jess Lee	Joey Yung							
Wang Kaici									Huang Xiaoyun	Zhe Lai Nv	
Wu Xin	Shang Wenjie										
Wu Xing										Grace Kinstler	
Wu Yang			Tiger Hu								
Wu Ze Lin									Sitar Tan	Chen Chusheng	
Xiao Ran Xin										Christine Fan	
Xiao Yanzi	Julia Peng										
Xi Ran										Mickey Guyton	
Cindy Yen									Chanté Moore		
Yan Wei			Hsiao Huang-chi	Elvis Wang				Jeryl Lee			
Yu Shasha					Liang Bo				Xu Jun		
YOYO	Sha Baoliang	Phil Chang									
Young Yang					Michael Wong	Tien Chong			Na Ying		
Zhang Dexing					Justin Lo						
Wayne Zhang	Paul Wong		Sitar Tan	HAYA Band	Tan Jing						
Zhang Yu'an				Hwang Chi-yeul							
JZ Zhou								Mao Buyi			
Ryan Zhuo				Guan Zhe		Juno Su					
Feng Qing									Rachel Zhang		
Su Meiyue									Hanggai Band		
Zhao Yicheng									Second Hand Rose	Pax Congo	Harlem Yu
Zheng Fang Yi									Tia Ray	Shan Yichun	Leah Dou
Zhuang Yu Guang										Ma Jiaqi	Eric Chou
