= Tia Ray =

Chinese singer (born 1984)

- 袁娅维
- Born: Yuan Juan (袁娟); 12 December 1984 (age 41); Huaihua, Hunan, China
- Occupations: Singer, songwriter

Chinese name
- Traditional Chinese: 袁婭維
- Simplified Chinese: 袁娅维
Transcriptions
Standard Mandarin
- Hanyu Pinyin: Yuán Yàwéi
- Musical career
- Genres: C-pop, R&B, Neo Soul, Jazz
- Instruments: Vocals, guitar, piano
- Label: Warner Music China

Tia Ray (simplified Chinese: 袁娅维; traditional Chinese: 袁婭維; pinyin: Yuán Yàwéi; born 12 December 1984) is a Chinese singer-songwriter from Hunan, China. She rose to fame in 2012 as a contestant in The Voice of China, finishing as one of the final contenders. Ray has since released four commercially successful albums, all of which she co-wrote and co-produced. Prior to breaking into the mainstream, she has spent close to a decade performing in smaller venues, music festivals, and collaborating with musicians in Beijing, where she pursued her studies of performing arts. In 2010, she formed her jazz band The Knutz with Chinese and African-American musicians, with whom she wrote, recorded and performed mainly R&B and neo soul music.

Ray had her international breakthrough in 2018 with the hit Be Apart, which generated 1.8 billion streams and was the seventh best-selling single in the world that year. She has since collaborated with various artists from the United States, including Kehlani, Jason Derulo, Gallant and Far East Movement, blending Chinese elements with traditionally Western music styles. Domestically, she has worked with singer-rapper Jackson Wang from the K-pop group Got7 and Masiwei from Chengdu rap group Higher Brothers.

Ray's popularity in Taiwan and Chinese-speaking communities has grown over the years. In 2021, she released her fourth studio album Once Upon A Moon and received the Most Popular Female Singer of the Year award from state-broadcaster China Central Television (CCTV). In 2022, Once Upon A Moon earned her two nominations at the 33rd Golden Melody Awards in Taiwan, including Best Mandarin Female Singer and Best Vocal Recording Album. The album also won her the Best Female Vocalist Award at the 15th Freshmusic Awards in Singapore, making her the first mainland Chinese singer to win this award.

== Life and career ==
Ray was born and raised in the town of Huai Hua, in the southwest province of Hunan. Her interest in music began at a young age, after being introduced by her friend to American singer Mariah Carey. In Grade 7 of she won her first award in singing at a school competition. A few years later, she left her hometown for Beijing in pursuit of performing arts studies.

=== 2000–2010: Career beginnings ===
Inspired by neo soul artists like India Arie, Stevie Wonder, Eryka Badu and Jill Scott, Ray formed her first band Soulside with fellow young musicians in Beijing. Soulside focused on R&B and soul music, which were niche genres in the local live music scene, occupied largely by oldschool rock and jazz musicians. The band gained a following through live-house and festival performances.

In 2010, Ray started her second band The Knutz. They continued to play at emerging venues and record original music.

=== 2012 - 2014: The Voice of China; release of debut album T.I.A. ===
Ray's mainstream breakthrough came in 2012, when she joined the televised singing competition The Voice of China. Her blues-infused rendition of the Chinese folk classic The Curvy Moon (弯弯的月亮) received critical acclaim from the judges. She signed with Gold Typhoon Group, one of China's largest independent music companies before being acquired by Warner Music Group in 2014, and released her debut album T.I.A., writing or co-writing all songs, including the hits Lost In Traveling and Love Can Fly.

=== 2017 - 2018: Breakthrough hit; TIARA ===
In 2017, Ray recorded Be Apart (说散就散) for the soundtrack of the movie The Ex-File 3: The Return of the Exes, which became her biggest hit and the seventh highest-selling song on IFPI's Global Singles chart. The following year, she released her sophomore album TIARA and kicked off her first solo concert tour. She collaborated with R&B singer Kehlani on Just My Luck, Jackson Wang on Lucky Rain and Will Pan on his single Moonlight.

=== 2019: International collaborations; 1212 ===
In 2019, Ray released an EP titled 1212, written, produced and recorded mainly in Los Angeles, where she worked with local musicians including The Rascals, frequent collaborator of Ariana Grande, Kehlani and Babyface, whom she met in one of the studio sessions.

During her stay in the city, she also collaborated with hip-hop group Far East Movement on "Paint the Clouds", Gallant on "Trust Myself," and Jason Derulo on "Champion", the theme song of the 2019 FIBA Basketball World Cup.

=== 2020 - Present: Beijing Winter Olympics theme song; ONCE UPON A MOON, TRIP, and ALLURE ===
In 2020, Ray released Starfall featuring electronic group HOYO-MiX, the theme song of Chinese video game Honkai Impact 3rd.

She recorded the original version of the Beijing Winter Olympics theme song Together for a Shared Future with Hong Kong singer William Chan, which developed into a final version featuring over 200 artists.

In 2021, she released her fourth studio album Once Upon A Moon, spanning singles such as I'm Not Good, Emo Whiskey and Little Too Much. The album earned her two nominations at the 33rd Golden Melody Awards in Taiwan, including Best Mandarin Female Singer and Best Vocal Recording Album. She also recorded an hour-long performance of new and old tracks, released together with the album.

In 2022, she released her fifth studio album Trip. In 2023, she released her sixth studio album Allure, which earned her a nomination for Best Mandarin Female Singer again at the 35th Golden Melody Awards.

== Musical style ==
Ray's music is heavily influenced by urban and African American genres like R&B, Soul and Jazz. She believes in the ability of music to transcend race. Critics and peers, including singer Hua Chenyu have described her as an "innovator" injecting new elements into the Chinese music industry.

== Discography ==
=== Studio albums ===
- T.I.A. (2014)
- Tiara (2018)
- 1212 (2019)
- Once Upon A Moon (2021)
- Trip (2022)
- Allure (2023)

=== Lead Singles ===
- "You Know I Love You" (2004)
- "Because of Love" (2004)
- "Stage Sisters" (2008)
- "Love Passes Love" (2008)
- "Tacit Understanding of Love" (2008)
- "Sweet Things" (2009)
- "Blossom" (2015)
- "Uncle Long Legs" (2016)
- "Love Herby" (2016)
- "Be Apart" (2018)
- "Starfall" (2020)
- "I'm not Good" (2021)
- "TIVA000" (2021)

=== Collaborations ===
- "Just My Luck" (feat. Kehlani) (2018)
- "Lucky Rain" (feat. Jackson Wang) (2018)
- "Moonlight" (feat. Will Pan) (2018)
- "Paint the Clouds" (Far East Movement) (2019)
- "Trust Myself" (feat. Gallant) (2019)
- "Complicated" (feat. Victor Ma) (2019)
- "Champion" (feat. Jason Derulo) (2019)
- "Be The Legend" (feat. Rtruenahmean) (2020)
- "Together for a Shared Future" (feat. William Chan) (2021)
- "Dance to the Moonlight" (feat. Nigel Tay) (2021)
- "Slow Ride" (feat. Matt Lu) (2022)
- "Like Me" (feat. Ma Siwei) (2022)
- "It Isn't Me" (feat. 22Bullets and Kshmr) (2022)

== Awards and nominations ==
| Award | Year | Category | Work | Result | Ref. |
|---|---|---|---|---|---|
| Golden Melody Awards | 2022 | Best Female Mandarin Singer | Once Upon A Moon | Nominated | |
| Golden Melody Awards | 2022 | Best Vocal Recording Album | Once Upon A Moon | Nominated | |
| Golden Melody Awards | 2024 | Best Female Mandarin Singer | Allure | Nominated | |
| Freshmusic Awards | 2022 | Best Female Vocalist | Once Upon A Moon | Won | |
| Freshmusic Awards | 2024 | Best Female Vocalist | Allure | Nominated | |
| Chinese Top Ten Music Awards | 2020 | Most Popular Female Singer | —N/a | Won | |
| Chinese Top Ten Music Awards | 2020 | Top 10 Golden Songs of the Year | "Looking Out for You" | Won | |
| Migu Music Awards | 2018 | Most Popular Female Singer | —N/a | Won | |
| Migu Music Awards | 2018 | Top 10 Songs of the Year | "Be Apart" | Won | |
| Beijing Pop Music Awards | 2018 | Female Singer of the Year Recommended by All Media | —N/a | Won | |
| China Music Awards | 2015 | Jury Recommendation | T.I.A. | Nominated | |
| China Music Awards | 2017 | Media Recommended Song | "Love Herby" | Won | |

== Achievements ==
Musical Achievements
| Year | Name of Achievement | Organizer | Result |
|---|---|---|---|
| 2021 | Ranked #1 Song 《Little Too Much》 | TME Wave Chart | Won |
| 2021 | The Most Popular Female Singer | CCTV Global Chinese Music Top 10 Awards | Won |
| 2019 | Female Singer of the Year | 2019 Chinese Songs and Music Festival | Won |
| 2017 | Singer Composer Award | 17th Annual Music Awards | Won |
| 2015 | Outstanding Young Singer Award for album T.I.A | CNTV Chinese Music Awards | Won |
| 2015 | The Best Performance Award for album T.I.A | CNTV Chinese Music Awards | Won |
| 2015 | Best Soul/R&B Album of the Year for album T.I.A | Chinese Jazz General | Won |
| 2012 | Hottest Musician Award | BQ Weekly Awards | Won |

== Singer performances ==
=== Singer 2017 ===
Ray first appeared in the Singer series as one of eight "initial singers" for the Season 5. She avoided elimination for the first two shows and was declared safe due to a contestant's withdrawal from the competition, but was eliminated on the third week. Ray later advanced to the semi-finals after reinstating her in the Breakout rounds and finished in seventh place.

Singer 2017 Performance List for Tia Ray
| Episode | Round | Broadcast Date | Song Title | Original Singer | Song Introduction | Ranking | Percentages of Votes | Remarks |
| 1 | 1st Qualifying Round | January 21, 2017 | "A-Chu" (阿楚姑娘 (Mandarin) | Frankie Liang | Lyrics: Meng Ye; Composer: Frankie Liang; Arranger: Zhao Zhao | 7 | 3.74% | Singer voting in third place |
| 2 | 1st Knockout Round | January 28, 2017 | "Love On Top" (English) | Beyoncé | Lyrics／Composer: Beyoncé Knowles, Terius Youngdell Nash, Shea Taylor; Arranger: Ni Ke | 6 | 9.24% | Singer voting in second place Overall ranking is sixth (6.49% of votes) |
| 3 | 1st Challenge Round | February 4, 2017 | "Mona Lisa's Tears" (蒙娜丽莎的眼泪; Mandarin) | Terry Lin | Lyrics／Composer: Zheng Huajuan; Arranger: Kubert Leung | 8 | 8.50% | Eliminated (finished last) |
| 4 | 2nd Knockout Round | February 11, 2017 | "Golden" (English) | Jill Scott | Lyrics: Jill Scott; Composer: Anthony Bell; Arranger: Fergus Chow | Non-ranked performance (Return Performance) | | |
| 11 | Breakout Round | April 1, 2017 | "开往春天的地铁" (Mandarin) | Yu Quan | Lyrics: Wu Xiangfei; Composer: Zhang Yadong; Arranger: Michael Ning, Phil Wen | 6 | 8.22% | Breakout Success |
| 11 | Breakout Round | April 1, 2017 | "Kiss from a Rose" (English) | Seal | Lyrics／Composer: Seal; Arranger: Michael Ning, Phil Wen | 6 | 8.22% | Breakout Success |
| 12 | Semi-Finals | April 8, 2017 | "Sex Machine" (English) | James Brown | Lyrics／Composer: James Brown, Bobby Byrd, Ron Lenhoff; Arranger: Nick Pyo | 7 | 8.84% | Advanced |
| 12 | Semi-Finals | April 8, 2017 | "爱是怀疑" (Mandarin) | Eason Chan | Lyrics／Composer: Hanjin Tan; Arranger: Nick Pyo | 7 | 8.84% | Advanced |
| 13 | Finals | April 15, 2017 | "奋不顾身" (Mandarin) | Liu Huan, Summer (singer) | Lyrics／Composer: Liu Huan; Arranger: Zhao Zhao, Meng Ke | 8 | 6.39% | Overall ranking is seventh (7.61% of votes); Assisted by guest singer Liu Huan |
| 13 | Finals | April 15, 2017 | "凤凰于飞" (Mandarin) | Liu Huan | Lyrics／Composer: Liu Huan; Arranger: Zhao Zhao, Meng Ke | 8 | 6.39% | Overall ranking is seventh (7.61% of votes); Assisted by guest singer Liu Huan |
| 14 | 2017 Biennial Concert | April 22, 2017 | "Misty" (English) | Johnny Mathis | Lyrics: Johnny Burke; Composer: Erroll Garner; Arranger: Chang Shilei | Non-ranked performance Assisted by guest singer Chang Shilei | | |
| 14 | 2017 Biennial Concert | April 22, 2017 | "来日方长" (Mandarin) | Isabelle Huang and Joker Xue | Lyrics: Chang Shilei; Composer: Tia Ray, Chang Shilei; Arranger: Chang Shilei | Non-ranked performance Assisted by guest singer Chang Shilei | | |

=== Singer 2018 ===
Ray was invited as one of the four guest singers from the 2017 season during the season's biennial concert along with a guest Victor Ma. That season was currently the latest season to feature a concert airing after the finals held one week before. The 2018 season also featured runner-up Hua Chenyu, who also competed along with Ray and two other singers two years later, and Hua gone on to win the season.

Singer 2019 Performance List for Tia Ray
| Episode | Round | Broadcast Date | Song Title | Original Singer | Song Introduction | Ranking | Percentages of Votes | Remarks |
| 14 | 2018 Biennial Concert | April 20, 2018 | "下个，路口，见" (Mandarin) | Li Yuchun | Lyrics/Composer: Li Yuchun; Arrangement: Chen Hanwen; Chang Shilei | Non-ranked performance (as Guest Performer) | | |

=== Singer 2019 ===
Once again, Ray invited as a guest singer on the seventh season to accompany with Liu Huan (the eventual winner for that season) once more during the semi-finals.

Singer 2019 Performance List for Tia Ray
| Episode | Round | Broadcast Date | Song Title | Original Singer | Song Introduction | Ranking | Percentages of Votes | Remarks |
| 13 | Semi-Finals | April 5, 2019 | "City of Stars" (English) | Ryan Gosling and Emma Stone | Lyrics: Benj Pasek and Justin Paul; Composer: Justin Hurwitz | Non-ranked performance (as Guest Performer) | | |

=== Singer 2020 ===
Ray later returned for her second season in 2020, entitled Year of the Hits, as one of the four returning singers from Season 4 to 6 (including Lala Hsu, Jam Hsiao and season's winner Hua Chenyu). Ray was again eliminated after week eight, but not entitled to Returning Performances the following week due to safety concerns regarding the coronavirus outbreak at the time. However, she was reinstated upon her success in the Breakouts and went on to clinch as the season's runner-up, making her the best-performing previously eliminated singer in the series.

Singer 2020 Performance List for Tia Ray
| Episode | Round | Broadcast Date | Song Title | Original Singer | Song Introduction | Ranking | Percentages of Votes | Remarks |
| 1 | 1st Qualifier Round | February 7, 2020 | "我爱" (Mandarin) | Tia Ray | Lyrics: Malay, Trey Cambell, Tia Ray, Li Cong; Composer: Malay, Trey Cambell, Tia Ray; Arranged: Michael Ning, Julian Waterfall Pollack | 6 | 6.55% | Won "Surprise Challenge" against Jeryl Lee (247-232) |
| 2 | 1st Knockout Round | February 14, 2020 | "不亏不欠" (Mandarin) | Tia Ray | Lyrics: Cheung Cho Kiu; Composer: Khris Riddick-Tynes, Leon Thomas III, Debbie Aramide; Arranged: Huang Yun Xun, Zhang Yiyu | 3 | 14.36% | Overall placement is sixth (10.455% of votes) |
| 3 | 2nd Qualifier Round | February 21, 2020 | "有一种悲伤" (Mandarin) | A-Lin | Lyrics: Gavin Lin; Composer: Alex Chang Jien | 5 | 10.67% | |
| 4 | 2nd Knockout Round | February 28, 2020 | "Love Can Fly" (Mandarin) | Tia Ray | Lyrics: Tia Ray; Composer: Chang Shilei | 4 | 15.92% | Overall placement is fifth (13.295% of votes) |
| 5 | 3rd Qualifier Round | March 6, 2020 | "凄美地" (Mandarin) | Guo Ding | Lyrics/Composer: Guo Ding | 4 | 15.15% | Lost "Surprise Challenge" against Jike Junyi (212-274) |
| 6 | 3rd Knockout Round | March 13, 2020 | "月牙湾" (Mandarin) | F.I.R. | Lyrics: Kevin Yi, Xie Youhui; Composer: Real Huang | 2 | 17.13% | Overall placement is third (16.145% of votes) |
| 7 | 4th Qualifier Round | March 20, 2020 | "存·不存在" (Mandarin) | Tia Ray | Lyrics: Yu Hong Long, Ape Kao; Composer: Yu Hong Long | 5 | 14.23% | |
| 8 | 4th Knockout Round | March 27, 2020 | "I Love You 3000 II" (English) | Jackson Wang | Lyrics/Composer: Jackson Wang, Stephanie Poetri | 7 | 7.78% | Eliminated/Overall placement is seventh (11.005% of votes) |
| 8 | 4th Knockout Round | March 27, 2020 | "我想" (Mandarin) | Yu Jiayun | Lyrics/Composer: Yu Jiayun | 7 | 7.78% | Eliminated/Overall placement is seventh (11.005% of votes) |
| 11 | Breakout Round | April 17, 2020 | "盛夏光年" (Mandarin) | Mayday | Lyrics/Composer: Ashin | 1 | 38.04% | Breakout Success; Won Duel against Super-Vocal (328-157) |
| 12 | Grand Finals | April 24, 2020 | "2020 So Crazy" medley | | | 2 | N/A | Round 1 performance - Guest singer is Victor Ma; Won Duel against Misia (312-173) |
| 12 | Grand Finals | April 24, 2020 | "So Crazy" | Coco Lee | Lyrics: Hanjin Tan, Coco Lee; Composer: Coco Lee | 2 | N/A | Round 1 performance - Guest singer is Victor Ma; Won Duel against Misia (312-173) |
| 12 | Grand Finals | April 24, 2020 | "Lover Boy 88" | Higher Brothers; Phum Viphurit | Lyrics: Higher Brothers; Composer: Higher Brothers, Phum Viphurit | 2 | N/A | Round 1 performance - Guest singer is Victor Ma; Won Duel against Misia (312-173) |
| 12 | Grand Finals | April 24, 2020 | "Young Prince" | Victor Ma; Rainbow | Lyrics/Composer: Victor Ma | 2 | N/A | Round 1 performance - Guest singer is Victor Ma; Won Duel against Misia (312-173) |
| 12 | Grand Finals | April 24, 2020 | "Starfall" | Tia Ray | Lyrics: TetraCalyx; Composer: Zoe Tsai | 2 | 30.68% | Round 2 performance |
