= University of the Arts =

University of the Arts or University of Arts may refer to:

- University of the Arts (Philadelphia) in Philadelphia, Pennsylvania, United States
- University of the Arts London in London, England, United Kingdom

== China ==
- Jilin University of Arts in China
- Nanjing University of the Arts in China

== Germany ==
- Berlin University of the Arts
- University of the Arts Bremen
- Folkwang University of the Arts in the Ruhr Area
- Karlsruhe University of Arts and Design

== Japan ==
- Kyoto City University of Arts
- Kyoto Saga University of Arts
- Kyoto University of the Arts
- Nagoya University of Arts
- Osaka University of Arts
- Tokyo University of the Arts

== Romania ==
- Bucharest National University of Arts
- George Enescu National University of Arts

== Switzerland ==
- University of the Arts Bern
- Zurich University of the Arts

== Taiwan ==
- National Taiwan University of Arts in New Taipei
- Taipei National University of the Arts in Taipei City
- Tainan National University of the Arts

== Other countries ==
- University of Arts, Tirana (formerly Academy of Arts in Tirana) in Albania
- Universidad Nacional de las Artes in Buenos Aires, Argentina
- University of Art and Design Linz in Austria
- Alberta University of the Arts in Calgary, Alberta, Canada
- University of the Arts Helsinki in Finland
- Iceland University of the Arts in Reykjavík, Iceland
- Isfahan University of Art in Iran
- Amsterdam University of the Arts in the Netherlands
- Magdalena Abakanowicz University of the Arts Poznan in Poland
- University of Arts in Belgrade in Serbia
- University of the Arts Singapore in Singapore
- Korea National University of Arts in Seoul, South Korea
- Stockholm University of the Arts in Sweden
- Norwich University of the Arts in Norfolk, United Kingdom
