= Julia Peng =

Taiwanese singer (born 1972)

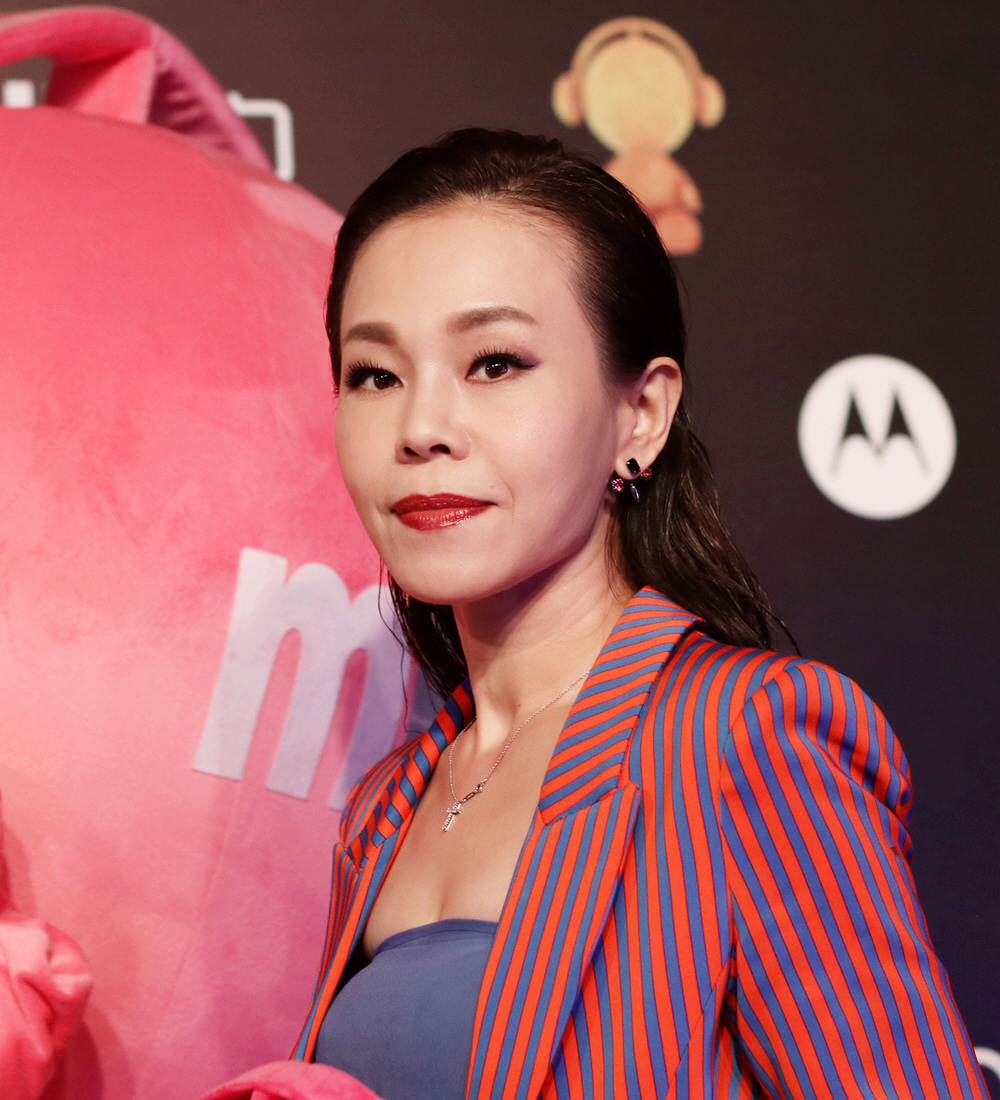
- Peng in 2015
- Born: 20 April 1972 (age 53); Linluo, Pingtung, Taiwan
- Occupation: Singer
- Years active: 1996–present
- Known for: Singer 2017
- Spouse: Steven Wang (m. 2006; div. 2018)
- Children: 3
- Musical career
- Origin: Taipei, Taiwan
- Genres: Mandopop
- Instrument: Vocals
- Labels: BMG; Sony

Chinese name
- Chinese: 彭佳慧
Transcriptions
Standard Mandarin
- Hanyu Pinyin: Péng Jiāhuì
- Wade–Giles: Peng Chia-hui

Julia Peng (Chinese: 彭佳慧; pinyin: Péng Jiāhuì; Wade–Giles: Peng Chia-hui; born 20 April 1972) is a Taiwanese singer. She won the Best Mandarin Female Singer award at the 27th Golden Melody Awards in 2016.

== Personal life ==
Peng was born in Liudui Hakka Village, Pingtung County, Taiwan. She attended Pingtung County’s National Chaochou Senior High School. She was married to Steven Wang from 2006 until 2018. They have three children.

== Career ==
Peng was discovered by Cheng Po-qiu of Elite Music Company in 1995. She released her debut in 1996 with the album "Speaking From the Heart (說真心話)". She received Best New Artist Award at the 8th Golden Melody Awards (GMA) in 1997. Her well-known songs included Love To The Point Of No Return (愛到無路可退), Regret Not Meeting Earlier (相見恨晚). and Hardhearted (死心眼). Her contract with Elite Music ended in 2002. After this she appeared in the musical "Wishing We Last Forever (但願人長久)? playing a young Teresa Teng and performing in China and around Southeast Asia.

In 2013 she joined season one of the popular singing competition show I Am a Singer, produced by Hunan Television, as a substitute contestant. She later made guest appearances in the show’s season two and returned in season five as one of several past contestants invited back to compete. Although she did not advance to the finals that season, her appearances helped introduce her music to a broader mainland Chinese audience.

I Am a Singer (season 1)

I Am a Singer Season 1 Julia Peng's Performance List
Episode	Round	Broadcast Date	Song Title	Original Singer	Song Introduction	Ranking	Percentages of Votes	Remarks
9	Qualifying Round 5	March 15, 2013	"The Day On The Red Carpet" (Mandarin)	Julia Peng	Lyrics: Preston Lee; Composer: Chen Kuo Hua; Arranger: Kubert Leung	3	15.20%	—
10	Knockout Round 5	March 22, 2013	"Cruel Gentle" (Mandarin)	Chyi Chin	Lyrics: Li Gedi; Composer: Chyi Chin; Arranger: Kubert Leung	4	12.35%	A4th place in Overall ranking
11	Revival Round	March 29, 2013	Exempted (did not perform this week)					
12	Semifinal	April 5, 2013	"One Moment in Time" (English)	Whitney Houston	Lyrics: Albert Hammond; Composer: John Bettis; Arranger: Kubert Leung	4	Unknown	—
13	1st Final Round	April 12, 2013	"Any Beer Bottles For Sale" (Mandarin)	Su Rui	Lyrics: Lo Ta Yu, Hou Dejian; Composer: Hou Dejian; Arranger: Yao Hung; Hong Xinjie	5	Unknown	Backup singer is Shunza
13	1st Final Round	April 12, 2013	"Nothing to My Name" (Mandarin)	Cui Jian	Lyrics／Composer: Cui Jian; Arranger: Yao Hung; Hong Xinjie	5	Unknown	Backup singer is Shunza
13	2nd Final Round	April 12, 2013	"Tegret Not Having Met Earlier" (Mandarin)	Julia Peng	Lyrics: Wawa; Composer: Chen Kuo Hua; Arranger: Kubert Leung	Unknown		Did not qualify for the "Ultimate Winner Candidate"
2014 Biennial Concert		April 11, 2014	"Lukang Town" (Mandarin)	Lo Ta Yu	Lyrics／Composer: Lo Ta Yu; Arranger: Kubert Leung	—		

Singer 2017

.

Singer2017 Julia Peng's Performance List
Episode	Round	Broadcast Date	Song Title	Original Singer	Song Introduction	Ranking	Percentages of Votes	Remarks
9	Challenge Round 4	March 18, 2017	"Loving One Who Doesn't Go Home" (Mandarin)	Sandy Lam	Lyrics: Ting Hsiao Wen; Composer: Chan Chi Yuen; Arranger: Again	7	10.64%	—
10	Knockout Round 5	March 25, 2017	"I Miss You So Much" (Mandarin)	Mindy Quah	Lyrics: Julia Peng, Huang Kwei Lan, Tai Wei Cheng; Composer: Julia Peng; Arranger: Nick Pyo	6	10.59%	Eliminated; Last Place in Overall ranking
11	Breakouts Round	April 1, 2017	"The Senior Lady" (Mandarin)	Julia Peng	Lyrics: Chen Hung-yu; Composer: Ricky Hsiao; Arranger: Nick Pyo	7	7.22%	Breakout success (ranked 6th out of top seven performers)
11	Breakouts Round	April 1, 2017	"The Day On The Red Carpet" (Mandarin)	Julia Peng	Lyrics: Preston Lee; Composer: Chen Kuo Hua; Arranger: Nick Pyo	7	7.22%	Breakout success (ranked 6th out of top seven performers)
12	Semi-finals	April 8, 2017	"I Wanna Dance With Somebody" (English)	Whitney Houston	Lyrics／Composer: George Merrill, Shannon Rubicam; Arranger: Nick Pyo	Unknown		Eliminated; Bottom Two Placements in ranking
13	Grand Finals	April 15, 2017	"Can't Take My Eyes Off You" (English)	Frankie Valli	Lyrics／Composer: Bob Crewe, Bob Gaudio; Arranger: John Laudon	Return Performance; Paired with Teresa Carpio; Nick Chung; Stella Chung		
13	Grand Finals	April 15, 2017	"Miss You Everyday" (Mandarin)	Chang Yu-sheng	Lyrics: Fred Chen; Composer: Chen Chih-yuan; Arranger: John Laudon	Return Performance; Paired with Teresa Carpio; Nick Chung; Stella Chung		

In March 2025 she appeared in a Hakka Affairs Council (HAC) and Kaohsiung City Government concert Home Return at the Kaohsiung Music Center, alongside Ella Chen and Joanna Wong.

== Awards ==
Peng was awarded the Golden Melody Award for Best Mandarin Female Singer in 2016 for Darling. She was nominated for the Best Mandarin Female Singer award at the 2018 Golden Melody Awards. She was named best singer in Hakka at the 2023 Golden Melody Awards.
