= Deng Zhonghan =

- Born: 5 September 1968 (age 57); Nanjing, Jiangsu, China
- Education: University of Science and Technology of China; University of California, Berkeley
- Spouse: Tan Jing
- Children: 1
- Scientific career
- Fields: Information and Electronic Engineering
- Workplaces: Vimicro

Chinese name
- Traditional Chinese: 鄧中翰
- Simplified Chinese: 邓中翰
Transcriptions
Standard Mandarin
- Hanyu Pinyin: Dèng Zhōnghàn

Deng Zhonghan (Chinese: 邓中翰; pinyin: Dèng Zhōnghàn; born 5 September 1968) is a Chinese electrical engineer and Internet entrepreneur. The co-founder of Vimicro International Corporation, Deng is currently its chairman and chief executive officer.

In 2020, Deng was elected a member of the National Academy of Engineering for the development of the world's first CMOS single-chip web camera and China's Surveillance Video and Audio Coding (SVAC) national video standard.

Deng is a member of the 10th and 11th National People's Congress and currently serves as the vice president of China Association for Science and Technology.

== Career ==
Deng received two master's degrees in Physics and Economics, then a Ph.D in Electrical Engineering and Computer Science from the University of California, Berkeley. After graduation, he worked as a research scientist at the IBM T.J. Watson Research Center before co-founding Pixim, Inc. which was acquired by Sony.

In 1999, Deng co-founded Vimicro Corporation in the Zhongguancun High-Tech district of Beijing. There he led the Vimicro engineering team to invent and develop the world's first single-chip high-performance, low-power video signal-processing VLSI CMOS chipset for PC/laptop web cameras. In 2005, Vimicro was listed on the NASDAQ stock exchange.

In 2008, Deng led the China "National Starlight Integrated-Circuit Project"as the Chief Executive at the State Key Laboratory of Digital Multimedia IC Design Technology as Chief Scientist to innovate and develop advanced algorithms, architecture, and semiconductor chipsets for the field of networked video surveillance technology.

Vimicro developed the SVAC (Surveillance Video and Audio Coding) standard, which was approved as the Chinese national standard in 2011. As of 2017, Vimicro owns more than 1600 patents, dominates the PC camera processor market with 60 percent global market share.

Deng was elected to the Chinese Academy of Engineering in 2009 at the age of 41, making him the youngest academician in the history of the CAE.

== Personal life ==
He is married to the famous singer Tan Jing, who gave birth to a child in 2014.
