= Wang Shansheng =

Chinese painter

- Born: 王善生 Wang Shansheng; 1942 (age 83–84); Liaoning, China
- Education: Jilin College of the Arts, China
- Known for: Oil Painting
- Movement: Chinese Realism, Chinese Russian School
- Awards: the Second Prize of the 5th National New Year Pictures, China; the Silver Prize of the 7th National Artwork Exhibition, China

Wang Shansheng (Chinese: 王善生; born 1942) is a Chinese painter, known predominantly for his works, depicting country life in China. Wang is a graduate of Jilin College of the Arts. As an outstanding figure of Changbai Mountain Painting School, Wang's works are prized with the Second Prize of the 5th National New Year Pictures, the Silver Prize of the 7th National Artwork Exhibition, etc. Works include Greeting the Bride, Wedding Ceremony and so on.

== Biography ==
Wang Shansheng, born in Liaoning Province in 1942, is a graduate of Jilin Institute of Art and an outstanding figure of Changbai Mountain Painting School. As a professional oil painting teachers, Wang's been on the committee of local museums and culture institutes. Since then, he's received many recognized awards from Chinese governments. His reputation is made more internationally known when he had an exhibition in Taiwan.

== Exhibitions ==
In 2001, Wang's work, Bells' Singing in Gold Autumn (金秋鈴聲), is awarded the honor prize at the 1st We Love China Art Exhibition that focuses purely on Chinese realism artists' works depicting the country side landscape from all areas in China.

Wang's famous works aim to catch a special moment or an event in people's life from the village in Lioaning, China.; His award-winning oil painting, Cow's Hammer Clinching (掛掌), depicting a live scene set up in a farm, where a farmer's clinching a cow; this tradition is still kept and executed in some areas in China. Wang's narrative approach to deal with the farmer and the cow is sophisticated and subtle, and renders a strong emotion from the scene. Wang's arts motif often is inspired by significant episodes from peoples' life, in particular those residing in less developed villages in Northern China. Wang's work, Greeting the Bride (迎新娘), is a large-size oil painting that is set up in a marriage ceremony in Liaoning, China, where bride and groom, joined by their friends and family, on traditional North-Eastern Chinese Korean color-patterned costumes, are joyfully singing and dancing with smiles, which is regarded the most significant event in the village where Wang lives since childhood.
