= Teresa Carpio =

Hong Kong singer and actress

- Born: 30 September 1956 (age 69); Ma Tau Wai, Kowloon, Hong Kong
- Occupations: Singer; actress
- Years active: 1975–present
- Partner(s): Peter Mui; Andreas Panayi
- Children: 3, including T.V. Carpio
- Awards: Golden Needle Awards; 2007 Lifetime Achievement

Chinese name
- Traditional Chinese: 杜麗莎
- Simplified Chinese: 杜丽莎
Transcriptions
Standard Mandarin
- Hanyu Pinyin: Dù Lìshā
Yue: Cantonese
- Jyutping: Dou6 Lai6 Saa1
- Musical career
- Origin: Hong Kong
- Genres: Pop, Cantopop
- Instruments: Vocals, piano

Teresa Carpio (born 30 September 1956) is a Hong Kong English- and Cantonese-language pop singer, actress, and singing teacher. Carpio was popular in Hong Kong during the 1970s and 1980s. She is the paternal cousin of actress and singer Rita Carpio, and also the mother of actress and singer T.V. Carpio. She is most well known for her Cantonese-language hits, 假如 (If), 仍然記得嗰一次 (I Still Remember That Time), 眉頭不再猛皺 (Sukiyaki), 何必放棄 (Why Give Up) and 真愛 (True Love).

== Family background ==
Carpio was born in St. Teresa's Hospital in Ma Tau Wai, to a Filipino father and a Shanghainese mother. Born into a musical family (her grandfather was a concert violinist and jazz guitarist, her father Fernando, a jazz drummer, and several uncles were also professional musicians), she began singing at age 6 when she entered and won Hong Kong's first Amateur Talent Quest. She is the eldest of five, all of whom have been active in the music business at some time. Her eldest daughter, TV Carpio, is a musician, actress, and Broadway singer.

== Career ==
Carpio began her career as a child star, winning Hong Kong's first Amateur Talent Quest in 1963 at the age of 6. At age 11, she turned down a scholarship at St Paul's Convent to work in her first job in Tahiti where her father was also working. Following that, she worked in clubs until she went to Japan for a year where she met Shintaro Katsu who sponsored her during her time there. She released her first single in Japan in 1971, entitled Ainoko Mary (混血児マリー).

Returning to Hong Kong, she worked in many nightclubs, such as Danshaku, Gessekai and the Hyatt Hotel's Chin Chin Bar, until EMI came and offered her a recording deal.

For several years from 1975 onwards Carpio had her own TV variety show in Hong Kong, on which she performed both solo and with several of her siblings. She released many albums in Hong Kong from 1976 onwards; six of her albums under EMI went gold, in which she featured cover versions in English of western hits, including an album with George Lam. She made numerous television appearances in Hong Kong, in the late 1970s.

Carpio was the first and the youngest Hong Kong singer ever to appear on national TV in Japan. She has performed in many other countries as far apart as Singapore, Malaysia, French Polynesia, Australia, Japan, Thailand, Brunei, the United States and Canada.

With the growing popularity of Cantopop, Carpio started to record in Cantonese along with English. In 1983, Carpio headlined the Hong Kong Coliseum for the first time. The concert was unsuccessful at the box office. Reception towards the concert was generally mixed: although Carpio's voice and stage presence was praised, the lack of Cantonese songs and audience interaction was criticised. According to Carpio, the concert caused her a lot of debt, partially leading to the dissolution of her first marriage.

She broadened her career into acting with appearances in a number of films, and auditioned for the lead role in Miss Saigon, though this eventually went to Lea Salonga. She was no stranger to live musical theatre, having taken the lead role in the 1979 San Jose production of the stage musical City of Broken Promises, based on the book by Austin Coates, a story set in Macau which won Best Original Musical.

Following her second marriage, Carpio moved to Canada and focused her attention on bringing up her family (she has three daughters, the eldest, T. V. Carpio, by her first marriage, also an actor, singer and songwriter).

== Discography ==
Carpio has released twenty five albums to date, including six live recordings. Her first eponymous studio album was released in 1975 and then quickly followed up with five more solo albums from EMI as well as a duet album with George Lam. In 1981 she moved to WEA and released one Cantonese-language album. In 1983 she formed her own record company, TV Records, which released three more Cantonese albums, on which – together with her WEA album – are some of her most popular songs. Since then she has released several live CDs and DVDs as well as a few studio recordings.

=== English ===
| Year | Title | Record Company |
|---|---|---|
| 1975 | Teresa Carpio | EMI |
| 1976 | Songs For You | EMI |
| 1976 | You've Got Me For Company | EMI |
| 1977 | Greatest Hits +2 | EMI |
| 1977 | Teresa Carpio | EMI |
| 1979 | Teresa Carpio | EMI |
| 1986 | Tokyo Dreaming | Warner-Pioneer |
| 1990 | If I Ever Needed Love | EMI |
| 2006 | A Family Christmas Album | Teresa Carpio International |
| 2009 | Hello | Teresa Carpio International |

=== Cantonese ===
| Year | Title | Record Company |
|---|---|---|
| 1981 | 杜麗莎 | WEA |
| 1983 | The Magic of Teresa Carpio | TV Records |
| 1985 | 何必放棄 | TV Records |
| 1986 | 杜麗莎 Teresa Carpio | Warner Pioneer |
| 1988 | 杜麗莎 Teresa Carpio | TV Records/Current Records |
| 2004 | Best of Times | Go East |
| 2010 | I Still Remember | BMA Records |

=== Duet ===
| Year | Title | Record Company | Duet Artist |
|---|---|---|---|
| 1978 | Teresa Carpio & George Lam | EMI | George Lam |
| 2012 | Time After Time | Universal | Alan Tam |

=== Live ===
| Year | Title | Record Company |
|---|---|---|
| 2001 | 麗花皇宮 | Warner |
| 2003 | HKPO & Teresa Carpio: DIVA | WSM |
| 2004 | True Love | Go East |
| 2005 | Always Lam in Concert | EEG |
| 2007 | Lam and Teresa Live | EEG |
| 2012 | Time After Time Live | Universal |

== Filmography ==
She has appeared in 13 movies in total, starting in 1984 with a lead role in Happy Ghost, where she also sang the theme song. She is more well-known for her later movies, where she often was famous such as 2003's Truth or Dare: 6th Floor Rear Flat where she sang part of "Boundless Oceans, Vast Skies", accompanying herself on keyboards.

=== Motion pictures ===
| Year | Title |
|---|---|
| 1984 | Happy Ghost |
| 1985 | Isle of Fantasy (開心樂園) |
| 1987 | No Regret (靚妹正傳) |
| 1988 | Three Wishes (黑心鬼) |
| 1988 | Bet On Fire (火舞风云) |
| 1988 | City War (義膽紅唇) |
| 1988 | 18 Times (好女十八嫁) |
| 1989 | It's A Mad Mad World 3 (富貴再三逼人) |
| 1996 | Age Of Miracles (嫲嫲帆帆) |
| 2003 | My Lucky Star |
| 2003 | Truth or Dare: 6th Floor Rear Flat |
| 2006 | Rob-B Hood |
| 2012 | All's Well, Ends Well 2012 |
| 2019 | I Love You, You're Perfect, Now Change (你咪理，我愛你！) |

== Teaching ==
Carpio began teaching in 1991, when Sandy Lam came to her and asked her to teach her in preparation for her concerts at the Hong Kong Coliseum. After that, many other singers followed, such as Sammi Cheng, Wong Cho Lam, Cecilia Cheung, Joey Yung, Gigi Leung, Alex To, Edmund Leung, Twins, and Jade Kwan.

She appeared on Hong Kong television as a judge and head vocal coach on season two of the singing competition The Voice.

== Major concerts ==
| Date | Concert | Venue | # of Performances | Solo/Joint/Guest | Special Guests |
|---|---|---|---|---|---|
| 1983 | The Magic of Teresa Carpio | HK Coliseum | 1 | Solo | None |
| 2001 | La Fa Palace (麗花皇宮) | HK Polytechnic University | 68 | Lead | N/A |
| 2002 | HKPO & Teresa Carpio: DIVA | Cultural Centre | 6 | Solo | TV Carpio |
| 2004 | True Love | HK Coliseum | 2 | Solo | Jacky Cheung, Gigi Leung |
| 2005 | Always Lam | HK Coliseum | 4 | Special Guest | N/A |
| 2007 | Lam & Teresa | HK Coliseum | 4 | With George Lam | Lowell Lo |
| 2010 | I Am A SInger | HK Coliseum | 2 | Solo | TV Carpio, Wong Cho Lam |
| 2012 | Time After Time | HK Coliseum | 9 | With Alan Tam | None |

== Singer 2017 ==
Prior to her appearance on Singer 2017, on 20 August 2016, she appeared as a guest singer on the finals of Crossover Singer 2016 for the performance of runner-up Wong Cho Lam (who sung a version of "The Prayer".)

As a result of her appearance, Carpio was selected as one of eight initial singers to compete in Hunan TV's Singer 2017. During her tenure, she told to the media that her participation was fueled by the fact that she was competing against another Hong Kong singer, Sandy Lam (who went on to win). Despite topping the singer's voting predictions (two 1st, one 2nd and one 3rd), she was eliminated on week five (2nd Knockout round) after receiving the lowest combined votes, largely due to finishing last on her prior week. Her elimination was not without controversy, with many fans questioning the elimination.

After her return performance on the week after elimination, Carpio later returned to the stage to participate the "Breakout Round", and at second place by a difference of three votes (0.15%) behind the top singer Li Jian. She was one of the few singers to be reinstated to the competition. However, she was shortly eliminated again on the semi-finals a week later as one of the bottom two singers (the other was Julia Peng), receiving a lower count of votes.

Singer2017 The Ranking of Teresa Carpio
| Episode | Broadcast date | Song title | Original singer | Ranking | Percentages of votes | Remarks |
| 1 (Qualifying Round 1) | 21 January 2017 | "Imagine" (English) | John Lennon | 3 | 16.05% | 1st Place in Singer Voting |
| 2 (Knockout Round 1) | 28 January 2017 | "卡門" "Carmen" (Mandarin) | Grace Chang | 5 | 10.79% | 1st Place in Singer Voting; 4th place in Overall Voting |
| 3 (Challenge Round 1) | 4 February 2017 | "Vincent" (English) | Don McLean | 7 | 9.91% | 3rd Place in Singer Voting |
| 4 ( Knockout Round 2) | 11 February 2017 | " 魯冰花/真的愛你" ("Lubing Flower/I Really Love You" (Mandarin/Cantonese)) | Beyond | 4 | 13.84% | 2nd Place in Singer Voting; 7th place in Overall Voting (eliminated) |
| 5 (Challenge Round 2) | 18 February 2017 | "爱是永恒" "Love is Forever" (Cantonese) | Jacky Cheung | Return performance (no ranking) | | |
| 11 (Breakouts Round) | 1 April 2017 | "Someone Like You/Rumour Has It" (English) | Adele | 2 | 19.89% | 1st Place in Singer Voting; Breakout Success (ranked 2nd out of top seven singers) |
| 12 (Semi-finals) | 8 April 2017 | "假如" (Cantonese) "是否" (Mandarin) | Teresa Carpio; Julie Su | Unknown | | Eliminated; Bottom Two Placements in ranking |
| 13 (Final) | 15 April 2017 | "Can't Take My Eyes Off Of You" (English) | Frankie Valli | — | | Return Performance (no ranking); Partnered with Julia Peng |

Awards
| Preceded by Adam Cheng | Golden Needle Award of RTHK Top Ten Chinese Gold Songs Award; 2007 | Succeeded by Albert Leung |
