= Singer season 5 =

Singer
- Season 5
- Judges: 500 public audiences
- Winner: Sandy Lam
- Runner-up: Dimash Kudaibergen
- Finals venue: Hunan Broadcasting System

Release
- Original network: Hunan Television
- Original release: January 21 – April 22, 2017

Season chronology
- ← Previous; Season 4 Next → Season 6

Singer 2017 was the fifth season of the Chinese television series of the rebranded version of I Am a Singer. Despite rebranding under a simplified title of Singer, the series retained similar competition format from the past four seasons of I Am a Singer. This is the only season in which no singers doubled their roles as the hosts, and He Jiong, who hosted the finale after a year's absence, served as the host.

The fifth season premiered on January 21, 2017, on Hunan Television, and ended on April 22, 2017. Hong Kong singer Sandy Lam was named the winner of the season, Kazakhstan's Dimash Kudaibergen and Taiwanese band Lion were named runner-up and third place, respectively.

== Competition rules ==
In spite of the renaming of the show, the format was otherwise similar from previous seasons of I Am a Singer. As seen in the last season, the competing singers performed on stage and the 500-member audience panel voted, deciding the outcome of the results. At the end of each Knockout round, the singer with the fewest votes combined from both Qualifier and Knockouts was eliminated.

The Challenge round twist first seen in the third season, also returned with a modification with two singers (one Challenger and one Returning Singer from previous seasons) entering the competition. As in the previous series, in order to be safe, challengers, but not returning singers, had to beat a majority of singers by ranking in the top four or better, while the results from the Challenge rounds were counted individually.

This is the only season to have an increased number of finalists (ten), and the first season to feature returning singers from previous seasons. This was the last season to feature Singer voting which was introduced in Season 3.

== Contestants ==
The following singers participated in Singer 2017 are listed in alphabetical order (singers without a placement for the final are listed as finalists; singers eliminated before the finals are listed as non-finalists; singers who withdrew are listed as withdrawn):

Key:

– Winner
– Runner-up
– Third place
– Other finalist
– Withdrew
– Withdrew (Initially eligible for Breakout round but did not participate)

=== New singers ===
Contestant	Country	Music Partner	Status	Week Entered	Week Exited	Result
Teresa Carpio	Hong Kong/Canada	Jeffrey G	Initial singer	Week 1 (Qualifier round 1); Week 11 (Breakout round)	Week 4 (Knockout round 2); Week 12 (Semi-finals)	Semi-finalist (9th/10th place)
Hins Cheung	Hong Kong	Since Seah	Initial singer	Week 1 (Qualifier round 1)	Week 1 (Qualifier round 1)	Withdrew
Dimash Kudaibergen	Kazakhstan	Aray Aydarhan	Initial singer	Week 1 (Qualifier round 1)	Week 13 (Finals)	Runner-up
Sandy Lam	Hong Kong /Canada	Shen Ling	Initial singer	Week 1 (Qualifier round 1)	Week 13 (Finals)	Winner
Liang Bo	China	Yu Shasha	Challenger	Week 9 (Challenge round 3)	Week 9 (Challenge round 3); Week 11 (Breakout round)	Eliminated
Lion	Taiwan	Shen Mengchen	Initial singer	Week 1 (Qualifier round 1)	Week 13 (Finals)	Third place
Justin Lo	United States	Zhang Dexing	Challenger	Week 5 (Challenge round 2)	Week 6 (Knockout round 3); Week 11 (Breakout round)	Eliminated
Tia Ray	China	Aaron Sun Pu	Initial singer	Week 1 (Qualifier round 1); Week 11 (Breakout round)	Week 3 (Challenge round 1); Week 13 (Finals)	7th place
Tan Jing	China	Wayne Zhang	Initial singer	Week 1 (Qualifier round 1)	Week 7 (Qualifier round 2)	Withdrew
Michael Wong	Malaysia	Young Yang	Initial singer	Week 1 (Qualifier round 1)	Week 2 (Knockout round 1); Week 11 (Breakout round)	Eliminated
Diamond Zhang	China	Oscar Sun	Challenger/Substitute singer (Note: Zhang was made a substitute singer following Tan Jing's withdrawal, while Week 7 which was initially planned as a Challenge round (which would have caused Zhang to be eliminated) was modified as a Qualifier round.)	Week 7 (Qualifier round 2); Week 11 (Breakout round)	Week 8 (Knockout round 3); Week 13 (Finals)	6th place
Zhao Lei	China	Mandy Jin	Challenger	Week 3 (Challenge round 1)	Week 5 (Challenge round 2)	Withdrew

=== Returning singers ===
This is the first season to feature former I Am a Singer contestants returning to the competition. All four singers were given Substitute Singer status and entered the competition on the start of their respective Challenge round.

Contestant	Country	Music Partner	Previous IAaS performance	Week Entered	Week Exited	Result
Li Jian	China	Li Rui	Season 3 - Runner-up	Week 7 (Qualifier round 2)	Week 13 (Finals)	4th place
Terry Lin	Taiwan	Eliza Liang	Season 1 - Runner-up	Week 5 (Challenge round 2)	Week 13 (Finals)	5th place
Julia Peng	Taiwan	Wang Qiao	Season 1 - Finalist	Week 9 (Challenge round 3)	Week 12 (Semi-finals)	Semi-finalist (9th/10th place)
Jason Zhang	China	Li Weijia	Season 2 - Finalist	Week 3 (Challenge round 1)	Week 13 (Finals)	8th place

=== Future appearances ===
Dimash Kudaibergen, Lion, Tia Ray and Diamond Zhang returned as guest singers for the Biennial concert on season six. Tia Ray and Kudaibergen appeared as guest assistant singers during the finals for season seven. Ray and Jam Hsiao (of the Lion band) returned as contestants on the eighth season.

Outside Singer, Kudaibergen also appeared in CBS's reality competition The World's Best in 2019 where he withdrew after the Top 12 rounds.

== Results ==
First	Safe	Bottom	Eliminated	Return Performance	Challenger	Challenge Success
Challenge Failure	Breakout Success	Breakout Failure	Winner	Runner-up	Withdrew	

	Singer	Broadcast Date (2017)													
	Singer	Jan 21	Jan 28	Feb 4	Feb 11	Feb 18	Feb 25	Mar 4	Mar 11	Mar 18	Mar 25	Apr 1	Apr 8	Apr 15	
	Singer	1st Round		2nd Round		3rd Round		4th Round		5th Round		Breakout	Semifinal	Final Round	
	Singer	Qualifying	Knockout	Challenge	Knockout	Challenge	Knockout	Qualifying	Knockout	Challenge	Knockout	Breakout	Semifinal	Finals	Overall
1	Sandy Lam	2	3	6	2	2	3	1	4	5	1	—	1	1	1
2	Dimash Kudaibergen	1	1	3	3	6	1	3	5	2	3	—	2	2	2
3	Lion	4	4	5	1	7	5	4	3	3	5	—	5	3	3
4	S3 Li Jian	—	—	—	—	—	—	2	2	4	4	1	4	4	4
5	S1 Terry Lin	—	—	—	—	4	4	5	1	1	7	3	3	5	5
6	Diamond Zhang	—	—	—	—	—	—	7	7	—	—	5	6	6	6
7	Tia Ray	7	6	8	—	—	—	—	—	—	—	6	7	8	7
8	S2 Jason Zhang	—	—	4	5	3	6	6	6	8	2	4	8	7	8
=9	Teresa Carpio	3	5	7	4	—	—	—	—	—	—	2	—	—	—
=9	S1 Julia Peng	—	—	—	—	—	—	—	—	7	6	6	—	—	—
=11	Liang Bo	—	—	—	—	—	—	—	—	6	—	8	—	—	—
=11	Michael Wong	6	7	—	—	—	—	—	—	—	—	9	—	—	—
=11	Justin Lo	—	—	—	—	4	7	—	—	—	—	10	—	—	—
=11	Zhao Lei	—	—	2	7	8	—	—	—	—	—	—	—	—	—
=11	Tan Jing	5	2	1	6	1	2	4	—	—	—	—	—	—	—
=11	Hins Cheung	7	—	—	—	—	—	—	—	—	—	—	—	—	—

== Details of competitions ==
Note: The grey colour items mean it don't appear in the broadcast version.

=== First round ===
==== Qualifying ====
- Taping Date: January 10, 2017
- Airdate: January 21, 2017

The order of performance for this episode was determined through audience voting for their anticipated songs; singers may discuss their re-arrangement of performance order, which was reflected in the table. As there were eight first-round singers, the first round featured elimination for the singer who receive the fewest votes.

Tia Ray would have been eliminated for finishing last; however, Ray was later declared safe following Hins Cheung's sudden withdrawal; Cheung was later revealed to have participated in the political Umbrella Movement in Hong Kong after the episode was taped. Cheung's appearance (with the exclusion of a shot with him and Teresa Carpio) and performance were unaired and edited out of broadcast.

Singer 2017 1st Qualifying Round January 21, 2017
Order of Performance	Singer	Music Partner	Song Title	Original Singer	Lyrics	Composer	Arranger	Ranking	Singer Voting
1	Dimash Kudaibergen	Aray Aydarhan	"SOS d'un terrien en détresse" (French)	Daniel Balavoine	Luc Plamondon	Michel Berger	Kubert Leung	1	
2	Tia Ray	Aaron Sun Pu	"阿楚姑娘"	Frankie Liang	Meng Ye	Frankie Liang	Zhao Zhao	7	3 (tie)
3	Michael Wong	Young Yang	"第一次"	Michael Wong	Zhang Tiancheng	Michael Wong	Kubert Leung	6	2
4	Hins Cheung	Since Seah	"吻得太逼真"	Hins Cheung	Chan Yiu Chuen	Chow Bing Fai	Johnny Yim	7^{[a]}	-
5	Teresa Carpio	Jeffrey G	"Imagine" (English)	John Lennon			John Laudon	3	1 (tie)
6	Lion	Shen Mengchen	"Lion"	Lion		Jam Hsiao	Lee Q Wu	4	—
7	Tan Jing	Wayne Zhang	"再见青春"	Wang Feng			Rama Liu	5	—
8	Sandy Lam	Shen Ling	"不必在乎我是谁"	Sandy Lam	Jonathan Lee		Zheng Nan	2	3 (tie)

a. Hins Cheung withdrew from Singer 2017 prior to the episode's airing. Cheung was ranked seventh, but his performance was excluded from the tally. Footage of his performance was edited out from the episode re-runs and in video-sharing websites as well.

==== Knockout ====
- Taping Date: January 20, 2017
- Airdate: January 28, 2017

Singer 2017 1st Knockout Round January 28, 2017
Order of Performance	Singer	Music Partner	Song Title	Original Singer	Lyrics	Composer	Arranger	Ranking	Singer Voting
1	Michael Wong	Young Yang	"那一段日子"	Eric Moo			Zhao Zhao	7	—
2	Tan Jing	Wayne Zhang	"九儿"	Han Hong	Roc Chen; He Qiling	Roc Chen	Yian Tianwu	2	3
3	Tia Ray	Aaron Sun Pu	"Love On Top"	Beyoncé	Beyoncé Knowles; Terius Youngdell Nash; Shea Taylor		Ni Ke	6	2
4	Dimash Kudaibergen	Aray Aydarhan	"Opera 2"	Vitas	Vitas; V. Borovsky	Vitas	Da Ridan	1	—
5	Teresa Carpio	Jeffrey G	"Carmen" (Mandarin adaptation of Habanera from the opera Carmen)	Grace Chang; Angel Lee; A-Mei	Li Junqing	Georges Bizet	John Laudon	5	1
6	Lion	Shen Mengchen	"你是我心爱的姑娘"	Wang Feng		Zhang Renjie	Lee Q Wu	4	—
7	Sandy Lam	Shen Ling	"无赖"	Penny Tai			Zheng Nan	3	—

==== Overall ranking ====
Singer 2017 1st Round overall ranking
Ranking	Singer	Match 1 Percentages of Votes (Ranking)	Match 2 Percentages of Votes (Ranking)	Total percentages of votes
1	Dimash Kudaibergen	27.00% (1)	24.36% (1)	25.68%
2	Sandy Lam	22.60% (2)	13.43% (3)	18.01%
3	Tan Jing	10.45% (5)	23.88% (2)	17.16%
4	Teresa Carpio	16.05% (3)	10.79% (5)	13.42%
5	Lion	12.74% (4)	12.95% (4)	12.84%
6	Tia Ray	3.74% (7)	9.24% (6)	6.49%
7	Michael Wong	7.41% (6)	5.33% (7)	6.37%
WD	Hins Cheung	— (7)	—	—

=== Second round ===
==== Challenge ====
- Taping Date: January 21, 2017
- Airdate: February 4, 2017

The first returning singer was Jason Zhang from Season 2, while the first challenger of the season was Zhao Lei.

Singer 2017 2nd Challenge Round February 4, 2017
Order of Performance	Singer	Music Partner	Song Title	Original Singer	Lyrics	Composer	Arranger	Ranking	Singer Voting
1	Sandy Lam	Shen Ling	"Run"	Snow Patrol			Johnny Yim	6	—
2	Tan Jing	Wayne Zhang	"欲水"	Chyi Yu	Johnny Chen		Rama Liu	1	
3	Lion	Shen Mengchen	"百年孤寂"	Faye Wong	Lin Xi	CY Kong; Adrian Chan	Tsou Chiang	5	—
4	Tia Ray	Aaron Sun Pu	"蒙娜丽莎的眼泪"	Terry Lin	Zheng Huajuan		Kubert Leung	8	—
5	Michael Wong	Young Yang	"请不要在别人的肩上哭泣"	Chao Chuan	Steve Chow	Lo Hung Wu	Zhao Zhao	Return Performance	
6	Dimash Kudaibergen	Aray Aydarhan	"The Show Must Go On"	Queen	Brian May	Queen	Erlan Bekchurin	3	—
7	Teresa Carpio	Jeffrey G	"Vincent"	Don McLean			John Laudon	7	3
8	Jason Zhang	Li Weijia	"很奇怪我愛你"	Jason Zhang	Qu Shicong		Qu Shicong; Jason Zhang	4	—
9	Zhao Lei	Mandy Jin	"成都"	Zhao Lei			Zhao Lei; Xi Zi; Liu Sen	2	

==== Knockout ====
- Taping Date: February 2, 2017
- Airdate: February 11, 2017

Singer 2017 2nd Knockout Round February 11, 2017
Order of Performance	Singer	Music Partner	Song Title	Original Singer	Lyrics	Composer	Arranger	Ranking	Singer Voting
1	Tan Jing	Wayne Zhang	"定风波"	Jacky Cheung	Chris Shum	Leon Ko	Kubert Leung	6	—
2	Tia Ray	Aaron Sun Pu	"Golden"	Jill Scott		Anthony Bell	Fergus Chow	Return Performance	
3	Zhao Lei	Mandy Jin	"理想"	Zhao Lei				7	—
4	Teresa Carpio	Jeffrey G	"真的爱你"	Beyond	Siu Mei	Wong Ka Kui	John Laudon	4	2
5	Jason Zhang	Li Weijia	"Better Man"	Robbie Williams	Robbie Williams; G.Chambers		Ni Ke	5	—
6	Dimash Kudaibergen	Aray Aydarhan	"秋意浓"	Jacky Cheung	Daryl Yao	Kōji Tamaki	Samal Ermakhanov	3	—
7	Sandy Lam	Shen Ling	"我最亲爱的"	A-mei	Lin Xi	Russell Harris	Ni Ke	2	1
8	Lion	Shen Mengchen	"你是我最深爱的人"	Shaun			Ni Ke	1	2

==== Overall ranking ====
Singer 2017 2nd Round overall ranking
Ranking	Singer	Match 1 Percentages of Votes (Ranking)	Match 2 Percentages of Votes (Ranking)	Total percentages of votes
1	Tan Jing	25.51% (1)	12.49% (6)	19.00%
2	Dimash Kudaibergen	14.82% (3)	15.56% (3)	15.19%
3	Lion	10.90% (5)	18.17% (1)	14.53%
4	Sandy Lam	10.69% (6)	17.50% (2)	14.09%
5	Zhao Lei	16.75% (2)	9.27% (7)	13.01%
6	Jason Zhang	11.40% (4)	13.16% (5)	12.28%
7	Teresa Carpio	9.91% (7)	13.84% (4)	11.87%

=== Third round ===
==== Challenge ====
- Taping Date: February 9, 2017
- Airdate: February 18, 2017

The second returning singer was Terry Lin from Season 1, while the second challenger of the season was Justin Lo.

Singer 2017 3rd Challenge Round February 18, 2017
Order of Performance	Singer	Music Partner	Song Title	Original Singer	Lyrics	Composer	Arranger	Ranking	Singer Voting
1	Dimash Kudaibergen	Aray Aydarhan	"Uptown Funk"	Mark Ronson; Bruno Mars	Devon Christopher Gallaspy; Mark Ronson; Bruno Mars; Nicholas Williams; Philip Martin Lawrence II; Jeff Bhasker		Kong Xiao Yi	6	—
2	Teresa Carpio	Jeffrey G	"爱是永恒"	Jacky Cheung	Richard Lam	Dick Lee	John Laudon	Return Performance	
3	Zhao Lei	Mandy Jin	"月亮粑粑"	Zhong Zhigang			Kubert Leung; Xizi	8	—
4	Jason Zhang	Li Weijia	"默"	Na Ying; Angeline Wong	Yi Yue	Qian Lei	Ni Ke	3	2
5	Sandy Lam	Shen Ling	"克卜勒"	Stefanie Sun	Hush		Johnny Yim	2	—
6	Lion	Shen Mengchen	"It's My Life" (English)	Bon Jovi	Jon Bon Jovi; Richie Sambora; Max Martin		Kenn C	7	3
7	Tan Jing	Wayne Zhang	"赛里木湖的月光"	Tan Jing	Tan Jing; Lin Du; Rama Liu	Rama Liu		1	
8	Terry Lin	Eliza Liang	"你永远不知道"	Terry Lin	Louise Lou	Jennifer Johan Lee	Baby Chung	4 (tie)	—
9	Justin Lo	Zhang Dexing	"命硬"	Justin Lo	Wyman Wong	Justin Lo	Edward Chan; Nick Wong	4 (tie)	—

==== Knockout ====
- Taping Date: February 16, 2017
- Airdate: February 25, 2017

Singer 2017 3rd Knockout Round February 25, 2017
Order of Performance	Singer	Music Partner	Song Title	Original Singer	Lyrics	Composer	Arranger	Ranking	Singer Voting
1	Jason Zhang	Li Weijia	"哥哥"	Chang Shilei	Wang Pingjiu	Chang Shilei	Ni Ke	6	3
2	Zhao Lei	Mandy Jin	"三十岁的女人"	Zhao Lei				Return Performance	
3	Terry Lin	Eliza Liang	"Writing's On The Wall" (English)	Sam Smith	Sam Smith; Jimmy Napes		Baby Chung	4	—
4	Justin Lo	Zhang Dexing	"很想很想说再见"	Justin Lo	Albert Leung	Justin Lo	Edward Chan	7	—
5	Dimash Kudaibergen	Aray Aydarhan	"Adagio")	Lara Fabian	Tomaso Albinoni; Rick Allison; Lara Fabian; Dave Pickell		Erlan Bekchurin	1	—
6	Tan Jing	Wayne Zhang	"怨苍天变了心"	Sophia Fang	Howard Ho	Hsu Chia Liang	Yian Tianwu	2	1
7	Sandy Lam	Shen Ling	"盛夏光年"	Mayday	Ashin		Martin Tang	3	1
8	Lion	Shen Mengchen	"用情"	Jeff Chang	Chan Ga-lai	Jamie Hsueh	James Yeo	5	—

==== Overall ranking ====
Tan withdrew from the competition after the Knockout episode aired, and results of her scores were displayed in grey text.

Singer 2017 3rd Round overall ranking
Ranking	Singer	Match 1 Percentages of Votes (Ranking)	Match 2 Percentages of Votes (Ranking)	Total percentages of votes
1	Tan Jing	21.20% (1)	18.52% (2)	19.86%
2	Dimash Kudaibergen	11.64% (6)	23.88% (1)	17.76%
3	Sandy Lam	17.12% (2)	17.30% (3)	17.21%
4	Terry Lin	11.93% (4)	14.11% (4)	13.02%
5	Jason Zhang	15.12% (3)	9.97% (6)	12.54%
6	Lion	11.05% (7)	10.78% (5)	10.91%
7	Justin Lo	11.93% (4)	5.43% (7)	8.68%

=== Fourth round ===
==== Qualifying ====
- Taping Date: February 23, 2017
- Airdate: March 4, 2017

The third returning singer was Li Jian from Season 3, while the third challenger of the season was Diamond Zhang.

Two days after the episode was taped, Tan announced her withdrawal from the competition, and footage of Tan's performances for this episode were edited out in broadcast due to privacy. Due to the sudden withdrawal, the rules of this round was changed to a Qualifying round, and consequently Diamond was declared safe after being initially eliminated for failing the challenge as she finished last this round.

Singer 2017 4th Qualifying Round March 4, 2017
Order of Performance	Singer	Music Partner	Song Title	Original Singer	Lyrics	Composer	Arranger	Ranking	Singer Voting
1	Dimash Kudaibergen	Aray Aydarhan	"Daididau"	Unknown			Erlan Bekchurin; Bakytbek Zeinelov	3	—
2	Justin Lo	Zhang Dexing	"Thinking Out Loud"	Ed Sheeran	Ed Sheeran; Amy Wadge		Nick Wong	Return Performance	
3	Terry Lin	Eliza Liang	"御龙铭千古"	Terry Lin	He Xiaotong	Gou Yin; Zhang Keke	Baby Chung	5	—
4	Lion	Shen Mengchen	"听不到"	Fish Leong	Ashin		Kenn C Orion J.	4	2
5	Sandy Lam	Shen Ling	"蓝莲花"	Xu Wei			Nick Pyo	1	
6	Tan Jing	Wayne Zhang	"达尼亚"	Pu Shu			Rama Liu	4	2
7	Jason Zhang	Li Weijia	"突然想爱你"	Valen Hsu			Nick Pyo	6	—
8	Li Jian	Li Rui	"异乡人"	Li Jian			Liu Zhuo	2	—
9	Diamond Zhang	Oscar Sun	"时间有泪"	Jacky Cheung	Chan Siu Kei	Balonz Su	Zheng Nan	7	—

==== Knockout ====
- Taping Date: March 2, 2017
- Airdate: March 11, 2017

Singer 2017 4th Knockout Round March 11, 2017
Order of Performance	Singer	Music Partner	Song Title	Original Singer	Lyrics	Composer	Arranger	Ranking	Singer Voting
1	Jason Zhang	Li Weijia	"你就不要想起我"	Hebe Tien	Derek Shih	Venk; Liu Dajiang	Nick Pyo	6	—
2	Li Jian	Li Rui	"父亲写的散文诗"	Xu Fei	Dong Yufang	Xu Fei	Liu Zhuo	2	—
3	Diamond Zhang	Oscar Sun	"红玫瑰"	Eason Chan	Francis Lee	Kubert Leung	Zheng Nan	7	—
4	Sandy Lam	Shen Ling	"崇拜"	Fish Leong	Chen Mei	Percy Phang	Zheng Nan	4	—
5	Lion	Shen Mengchen	"三天两夜"	Jacky Cheung	Hsu Chang Te	Jimmy Ye	Kenn C Christine Sham	3	1
6	Dimash Kudaibergen	Aray Aydarhan	"天亮了"	Han Hong			Erlan Bekchurin	5	—
7	Terry Lin	Eliza Liang	"卷珠帘"	Henry Huo	Li Shu; Luna	Henry Huo	Baby Chung	1	—
7	Terry Lin	Eliza Liang	"Scarborough Fair"	Tie Ming			Baby Chung	1	—

==== Overall ranking ====
Singer 2017 4th Round overall ranking
Ranking	Singer	Match 1 Percentages of Votes (Ranking)	Match 2 Percentages of Votes (Ranking)	Total percentages of votes
1	Li Jian	18.88% (2)	19.98% (2)	19.43%
2	Terry Lin	13.11% (5)	22.47% (1)	17.79%
3	Sandy Lam	19.83% (1)	13.68% (4)	16.75%
4	Lion	13.90% (4)	16.36% (3)	15.13%
5	Dimash Kudaibergen	17.30% (3)	9.79% (5)	13.55%
6	Jason Zhang	8.76% (6)	8.99% (6)	8.87%
7	Diamond Zhang	8.21% (7)	8.72% (7)	8.46%
WD	Tan Jing	— (4)	—	—

=== Fifth round ===
==== Challenge ====
- Taping Date: March 9, 2017
- Airdate: March 18, 2017

The fourth and final returning singer was Julia Peng from Season 1, while the fourth and final challenger of the season was Liang Bo. Jason Zhang would have been eliminated for finishing last, however, Bo was unsuccessful in his challenge (finished 6th) and was eliminated instead.

Singer 2017 5th Challenge Round March 18, 2017
Order of Performance	Singer	Music Partner	Song Title	Original Singer	Lyrics	Composer	Arranger	Ranking	Singer Voting
1	Li Jian	Li Rui	"十点半的地铁"	Liu Jinze	Yu Ge	Liu Jinze	Liu Zhuo	4	—
2	Diamond Zhang	Oscar Sun	"胡桃夹子"	Diamond Zhang			Zheng Nan	Return Performance	
3	Dimash Kudaibergen	Aray Aydarhan	"All by Myself"	Eric Carmen		Eric Carmen; Sergei Rachmaninoff	Erlan Bekchurin	2	—
4	Sandy Lam	Shen Ling	"多得他"	Faye Wong	Lin Xi	Babyface; L.A. Reid; Daryl Simmons	Nick Pyo	5	—
5	Terry Lin	Eliza Liang	"Feeling Good"	Cy Grant	Anthony Newley; Leslie Bricusse		Baby Chung	1	2 (tie)
6	Jason Zhang	Li Weijia	"我要你"	Lao Lang; Ren Suxi	Fan Chong		Zhao Zhao	8	—
6	Jason Zhang	Li Weijia	"天涯歌女"	Zhou Xuan	Tian Han	He Luting	Zhao Zhao	8	—
7	Lion	Shen Mengchen	"爱不爱我"	Lingdian			Kenn C Christine Sham	3	2 (tie)
8	Julia Peng	Wang Qiao	"爱上一个不回家的人"	Sandy Lam	Ting Hsiao Wen	Chan Chi Yuen	Again	7	—
9	Liang Bo	Yu Shasha	"灵魂歌手"	Liang Bo				6	1

==== Knockout ====
- Taping Date: March 16, 2017
- Airdate: March 25, 2017

Singer 2017 5th Knockout Round March 25, 2017
Order of Performance	Singer	Music Partner	Song Title	Original Singer	Lyrics	Composer	Arranger	Ranking	Singer Voting
1	Terry Lin	Eliza Liang	"裂心"	Wang Leehom			Baby Chung	7	—
1	Terry Lin	Eliza Liang	"Heaven Knows"	Rick Price	Heather Field; Rick Price		Baby Chung	7	—
2	Liang Bo	Yu Shasha	"男孩"	Liang Bo				Return Performance	
3	Sandy Lam	Shen Ling	"柿子"	Sandy Lam	Chang Shilei; Francis Lee	Chang Shilei		1	2
4	Dimash Kudaibergen	Aray Aydarhan	"Unforgettable Day"	Dimash Kudaibergen	Oral Baisengir (Kazakh)	Dimash Kudaibergen	Erlan Bekchurin	3	—
4	Dimash Kudaibergen	Aray Aydarhan	"Unforgettable Day"	Dimash Kudaibergen	Kaysha Tabarakkyzy (Mandarin)	Dimash Kudaibergen	Erlan Bekchurin	3	—
5	Li Jian	Li Rui	"红豆曲"	Ye Mao	Cao Xueqin	Wang Liping	Liu Zhuo; Jin Rui	4	—
5	Li Jian	Li Rui	"一生所爱"	Shu Qi	Wendyz Zheng	Lowell Lo	Liu Zhuo; Jin Rui	4	—
5	Li Jian	Li Rui	"May It Be" (English)	Enya	Roma Ryan	Nicky Ryan; Eith Ni Bhraonain	Liu Zhuo; Jin Rui	4	—
6	Jason Zhang	Li Weijia	"自己"	Xu Jun			Liu Zhou	2	1
7	Lion	Shen Mengchen	"最后的请求"	Lion	Jam Hsiao		Lion; Kenn C	5	—
8	Julia Peng	Wang Qiao	"想你想疯了"	Mindy Quah	Julia Peng; Huang Kwei Lan; Tai Wei Cheng	Julia Peng	Nick Pyo	6	—

==== Overall ranking ====
Singer 2017 5th Round overall ranking
Ranking	Singer	Match 1 Percentages of Votes (Ranking)	Match 2 Percentages of Votes (Ranking)	Total percentages of votes
1	Dimash Kudaibergen	17.63% (2)	16.71% (3)	17.17%
2	Sandy Lam	14.14% (5)	18.68% (1)	16.41%
3	Li Jian	15.25% (4)	16.04% (4)	15.64%
4	Lion	16.36% (3)	12.03% (5)	14.19%
5	Terry Lin	17.79% (1)	8.92% (7)	13.35%
6	Jason Zhang	8.18% (8)	17.02% (2)	12.60%
7	Julia Peng	10.64% (7)	10.59% (6)	10.61%

=== Breakout ===
- Taping Date: March 23, 2017
- Airdate: April 1, 2017

Three of the six singers who were initial singers (Lam, Lion and Kudaibergen) were exempt for this round, while the other three singers (with the exception of Cheung, Tan and Lei; Lei was however eligible but unable to take part due to scheduling conflicts on his concert) participated with eliminated singers for a chance to enter the semi-finals. The order was decided on ballot, with the exception of surviving non-initial singers (Li, Lin and Jason) who could choose their performance order for the night without ballot.

For the first time, the number of finalists was increased from seven to ten, thus seven Breakout spots were offered, and the top seven singers receiving the highest number of votes advanced to the semi-finals.

Singer 2017 Breakout April 1, 2017
Order of Performance	Singer	Music Partner	Song Title	Original Singer	Lyrics	Composer	Arranger	Ranking	Singer Voting
1	Michael Wong	Young Yang	"勇气"	Fish Leong	Ruiye	Michael Wong	Kubert Leung	9	—
2	Liang Bo	Yu Shasha	"日落大道"	Liang Bo				8	—
3	Diamond Zhang	Oscar Sun	"你给我听好"	Eason Chan	Lin Xi	JJ Lin	Zheng Nan	5	—
4	Tia Ray	Aaron Sun Pu	"开往春天的地铁"	Yu Quan	Wu Xiangfei	Zhang Yadong	Michael Ning; Phil Wen	6 (tie)	1 (tie)
4	Tia Ray	Aaron Sun Pu	"Kiss from a Rose" (English)	Seal			Michael Ning; Phil Wen	6 (tie)	1 (tie)
5	Julia Peng	Wang Qiao	"大龄女子"	Julia Peng	Chen Hung-yu	Ricky Hsiao	Nick Pyo	6 (tie)	—
5	Julia Peng	Wang Qiao	"走在红毯那一天"	Julia Peng	Preston Lee	Chen Kuo Hua	Nick Pyo	6 (tie)	—
6	Teresa Carpio	Jeffrey G	"Someone like You"	Adele	Adele; Dan Wilson		John Laudon	2	1 (tie)
6	Teresa Carpio	Jeffrey G	"Rumour Has It"	Adele	Adele; Ryan Tedder		John Laudon	2	1 (tie)
7	Justin Lo	Zhang Dexing	"停格"	Tanya Chua	Yao Chien	Tanya Chua	Edward Chan; Nick Wong	10	—
8	Li Jian	Li Rui	"逝去的愛"	Ouyang Fei Fei; Jacqueline Teo	Li Jian	Kaoru Ito	Liu Zhuo	1	—
9	Terry Lin	Eliza Liang	"你在最近的天边" (Mandarin adaptation of Le Temps des cathédrales from the opera Notre-Dame de Paris)	Bruno Pelletier	Louise Lou	Riccardo Cocciante	Baby Chung	3	—
10	Jason Zhang	Li Weijia	"别来纠缠我"	Black Panther	Dou Wei		Liu Zhou	4	—
10	Jason Zhang	Li Weijia	"Bleed It Out"	Linkin Park			Liu Zhou	4	—

==== Total percentages of votes ====
Singer 2017 Breakout Total percentages of votes
Ranking	Singer	Total percentages of votes
1	Li Jian	20.04%
2	Teresa Carpio	19.89%
3	Terry Lin	12.37%
4	Jason Zhang	9.17%
5	Diamond Zhang	8.32%
6 (Tie)	Tia Ray	8.22%
6 (Tie)	Julia Peng	8.22%
8	Liang Bo	5.66%
9	Michael Wong	4.75%
10	Justin Lo	3.36%

=== Semi-finals ===
- Taping Date: March 30, 2017
- Airdate: April 8, 2017

The semi-finals featured double elimination, and the two singers receiving the fewest votes were eliminated. For this round, singers went with a ballot with the singer who performed last going first. After the performance, the singer then choose a second singer to perform next among the remaining nine singers until only six singers remain, after which another ballot will take place and chooses the next four singers performing next in order, followed by a third ballot for the final two singers who draw first and last.

Singer 2017 Semi-Finals April 8, 2017
Order of Performance	Singer	Music Partner	Song Title	Original Singer	Lyrics	Composer	Arranger	Ranking	Singer Voting
1	Jason Zhang	Li Weijia	"We Will Rock You"	Queen	Brian May		Liu Zhou	8	—
1	Jason Zhang	Li Weijia	"我的王国"	Li Yuchun	Zhang Nan; Yee Kar Yeung	Jonas Jeberg; Anders Bagge; Kenisha Pratt	Liu Zhou	8	—
2	Li Jian	Li Rui	"一往情深的恋人"	Li Jian			Liu Zhuo	4	—
3	Julia Peng	Wang Qiao	"I Wanna Dance With Somebody" (English)	Whitney Houston	George Merrill; Shannon Rubicam		Nick Pyo	—	—
4	Tia Ray	Aaron Sun Pu	"Sex Machine"	James Brown	James Brown; Bobby Byrd; Ron Lenhoff		Nick Pyo	7	1 (Tie)
4	Tia Ray	Aaron Sun Pu	"爱是怀疑"	Eason Chan	Hanjin Tan		Nick Pyo	7	1 (Tie)
5	Diamond Zhang	Oscar Sun	"不散，不见"	Karen Mok	Francis Lee	Chang Shilei	Zheng Nan	6	—
6	Sandy Lam	Shen Ling	"Leslie Forever" medley				Jaydon Joo; Martin Tang	1	1 (Tie)
6	Sandy Lam	Shen Ling	"拒绝再玩"	Leslie Cheung	Richard Lam	Koji Tamaki	Jaydon Joo; Martin Tang	1	1 (Tie)
6	Sandy Lam	Shen Ling	"无心睡眠"	Leslie Cheung	Andrew Lam	Alvin Kwok	Jaydon Joo; Martin Tang	1	1 (Tie)
7	Teresa Carpio	Jeffrey G	"假如"	Teresa Carpio	Andrew Lam	Lo Ta-yu	John Laudon	—	—
7	Teresa Carpio	Jeffrey G	"是否"	Su Rui	Lo Ta-yu		John Laudon	—	—
8	Lion	Shen Mengchen	"Forever Love"	Wang Leehom	Wang Leehom; 10 square He Qi Hong; Yu Jingwen	Wang Leehom	Kenn C	5	—
9	Dimash Kudaibergen	Aray Aydarhan	"Confessa"	Adriano Celentano	Mogol (Italian)	Gianni Bella	Erlan Bekchurin	2	—
9	Dimash Kudaibergen	Aray Aydarhan	"Confessa"	Adriano Celentano	Tang Tian (Mandarin)	Gianni Bella	Erlan Bekchurin	2	—
9	Dimash Kudaibergen	Aray Aydarhan	"The Diva Dance"	Inva Mula Tchako	—	Éric Serra	Erlan Bekchurin	2	—
10	Terry Lin	Eliza Liang	"Somebody to Love"	Queen	Freddie Mercury		Baby Chung	3	—

=== Finals ===
- Airdate: April 15, 2017

During the finals, each singer invited a musical guest to perform with him or her on the first song. The winner was determined based on the combined number of votes accumulated during the semi-finals and the finals.

Singer 2017 Finals April 15, 2017 Host: He Jiong
Order of Performance	Singer	Music Partner	Help Singer	Song Title	Original Singer	Lyrics	Composer	Arranger	Final Results
1	Jason Zhang	Li Weijia	Cathleena Liu	"You Raise Me Up"	Secret Garden	Brendan Graham	Rolf Løvland	Yan Tianwu; Liu Zhuo	7
2	Diamond Zhang	Oscar Sun	Aska Yang	"凉凉"	Diamond Zhang; Aska Yang	Liu Chang	Tan Xuan	Nick Pyo	6
3	Lion	Shen Mengchen	Lala Hsu; Vanness Wu	"平凡之路"	Pu Shu	Han Han; Pu Shu	Pu Shu	Kenn C James Yeo	3
3	Lion	Shen Mengchen	Lala Hsu; Vanness Wu	"Faded"	Alan Walker	Alan Walker; Jesper Borgen; Mood Melodies; Gunnar Greve		Kenn C James Yeo	3
4	Tia Ray	Aaron Sun Pu	Liu Huan	"奋不顾身"	Liu Huan; Summer	Liu Huan		Zhao Zhao; Meng Ke	8
4	Tia Ray	Aaron Sun Pu	Liu Huan	"凤凰于飞"	Liu Huan			Zhao Zhao; Meng Ke	8
5	Li Jian	Li Rui	Yue Yunpeng	"Tripitaka In Daughter Country Lyrical To See Daughter king's Eyes" medley				Liu Zhuo	4
5	Li Jian	Li Rui	Yue Yunpeng	"女儿情"	Wu Jing	Yang Jie	Xu Jingqing	Liu Zhuo	4
5	Li Jian	Li Rui	Yue Yunpeng	"唐僧抒怀"	Chi Zhongrui	Yan Su	Xu Jingqing	Liu Zhuo	4
5	Li Jian	Li Rui	Yue Yunpeng	"你的眼睛"	Panda Hsiung; Valen Hsu	Adam Hsu	Panda Hsiung	Liu Zhuo	4
6	Terry Lin	Eliza Liang	Hayley Westenra	"The Prayer" (English／Italian)	Celine Dion; Andrea Bocelli	Carole Bayer Sager; Tony Renis; Alberto Testa	David Foster; Carole Bayer Sager	Baby Chung	5
7	Dimash Kudaibergen	Aray Aydarhan	Shang Wenjie	"A Tribute to MJ" medley				Erlan Bekchurin; Chen Di	2
7	Dimash Kudaibergen	Aray Aydarhan	Shang Wenjie	"The Way You Make Me Feel"	Michael Jackson			Erlan Bekchurin; Chen Di	2
7	Dimash Kudaibergen	Aray Aydarhan	Shang Wenjie	"Billie Jean"	Michael Jackson			Erlan Bekchurin; Chen Di	2
7	Dimash Kudaibergen	Aray Aydarhan	Shang Wenjie	"Dangerous"	Michael Jackson	Michael Jackson; Bill Bottrell; Teddy Riley		Erlan Bekchurin; Chen Di	2
7	Dimash Kudaibergen	Aray Aydarhan	Shang Wenjie	"Earth Song"	Michael Jackson			Erlan Bekchurin; Chen Di	2
8	Sandy Lam	Shen Ling	A-mei	"也许明天"	A-mei	Shih Li	Martin Tang	Nick Pyo	1
9	Teresa Carpio; Julia Peng	Jeffrey G Wang Qiao	Nick Chung; Stella Chung	"Can't Take My Eyes Off You"	Frankie Valli	Bob Crewe; Bob Gaudio		John Laudon	Return Performance
9	Teresa Carpio; Julia Peng	Jeffrey G Wang Qiao	Nick Chung; Stella Chung	"天天想你"	Chang Yu-sheng	Fred Chen	Chen Chih-yuan	John Laudon	Return Performance

==== Overall ranking (Winner of Battle) ====
Before the final results were announced, the host named Kudaibergen, Lion, Lam, and Li as "Ultimate Winner Candidates". Lam was declared as the winner of Singer 2017 with 22.74% of the combined votes cast.

Singer 2017 Results of Winner of Battle
Ranking	Singer	Semi-Finals^{[a]}	Finals	Total percentages of votes
1	Sandy Lam	22.60% (1)	22.89% (1)	22.74%
2	Dimash Kudaibergen	19.35% (2)	17.59% (2)	18.47%
3	Lion	9.75% (5)	16.44% (3)	13.09%
4	Li Jian	10.13% (4)	12.35% (4)	11.24%
5	Terry Lin	12.09% (3)	9.48% (5)	10.78%
6	Diamond Zhang	9.07% (6)	8.26% (6)	8.66%
7	Tia Ray	8.84% (7)	6.39% (8)	7.61%
8	Jason Zhang	8.16% (8)	6.60% (7)	7.38%

a. The percentage counting towards the total votes does not include votes cast from Carpio and Peng, who were eliminated at the semi-finals.

=== Biennial Concert ===
- Airdate: April 22, 2017

The concert featured nine singers, which include Season 3 winner Han Hong, Season 4 winner Coco Lee, as well as the top seven singers Lam, Kudaibergen, Lion, Li, Lin, Diamond and Ray.

Singer 2017 Biennial Concert April 15, 2017 Host: Wayne Zhang
Order of Group	Order of Performance	Team	Singer	Music Partner	Song Title	Original Singer	Lyrics	Composer	Arranger
1	1	Sounds of Nature Team	Li Jian	Li Rui	"三月的一整月"	Toru Takemitsu	Toru Takemitsu	Toru Takemitsu	Zhao Zhao
1	2	Golden Melody Team	Tia Ray; Chang Shilei	Aaron Sun Pu	"Misty" (English)	Johnny Mathis	Johnny Burke	Erroll Garner	Chang Shilei
1	2	Golden Melody Team	Tia Ray; Chang Shilei	Aaron Sun Pu	"来日方长"	Isabelle Huang; Joker Xue	Chang Shilei	Tia Ray; Chang Shilei	Chang Shilei
1	3	Golden Voice Team	Terry Lin	Eliza Liang	"离人"	Jacky Cheung	Li Manting	He Jiawen	Baby Chung
2	4	Sounds of Nature Team	Dimash Kudaibergen	Aray Aydarhan	"Give Me Love"	Dimash Kudaibergen	Мұнайдар Балмолда	Аigül Bajanova	Erlan Bekchurin
2	5	Golden Voice Team	Diamond Zhang	Oscar Sun	"袖手旁观"	Chyi Chin	Yao Chien	Huang Kuo Lun	Long Long
2	6	Golden Melody Team	Lion	Shen Mengchen	"一起摇摆"	Wang Feng			Lion
2	6	Golden Melody Team	Lion	Shen Mengchen	"Alive and Kickin'"	Mr. Big	Paul Gilbert; Eric Martin; André Pessis; Billy Sheehan; Pat Torpey		Lion
3	7	Sounds of Nature Team	Han Hong	Jeffrey G	"山丘"	Jonathan Lee			Qu Shicong
3	8	Golden Voice Team	Coco Lee	Young Yang	"Happy"	Pharrell Williams			Terence Teo
3	9	Golden Melody Team	Sandy Lam	Shen Ling	"小情歌"	Sodagreen	Wu Tsing-Fong		Kenn C James Yeo
