= Zhao Lei (singer) =

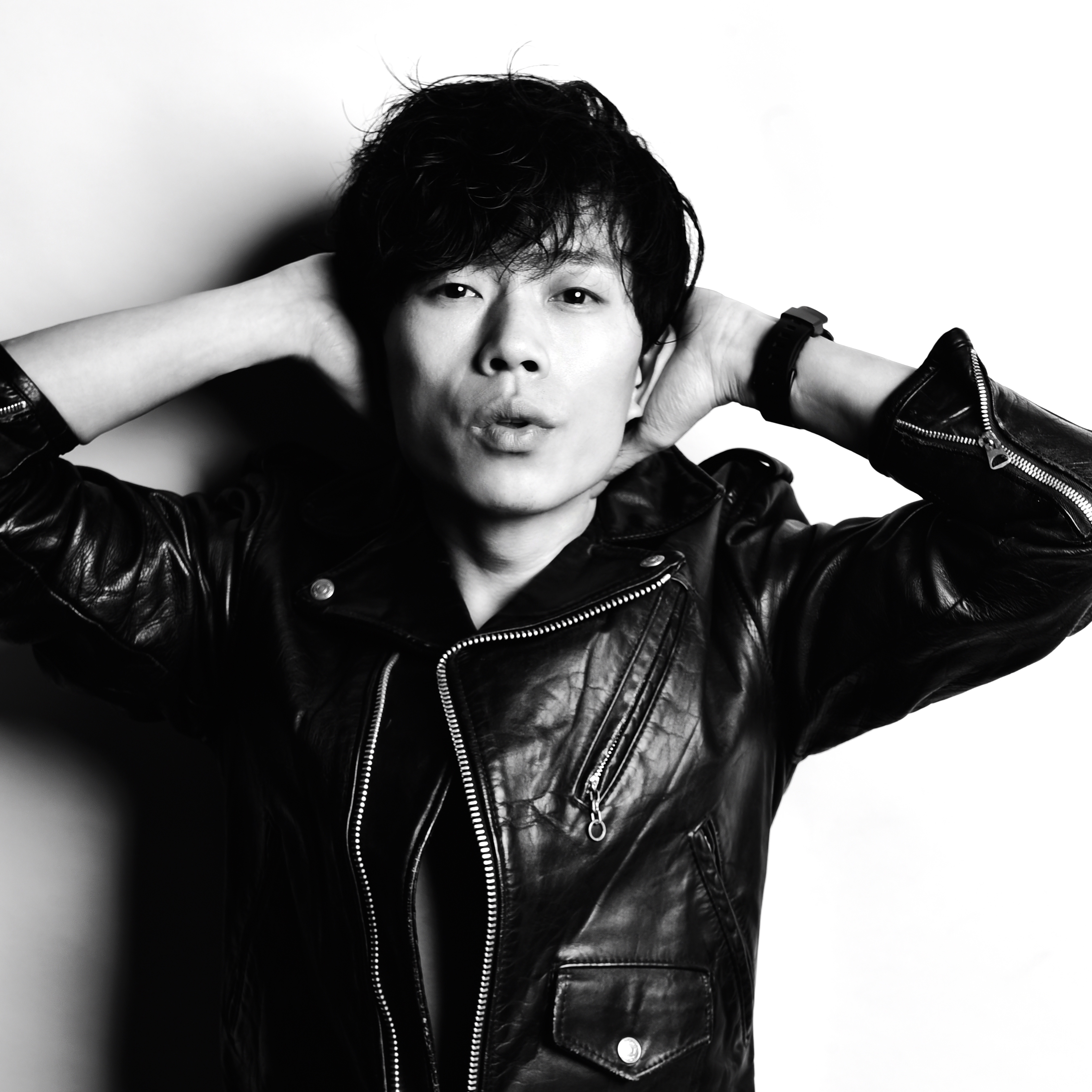
- Born: July 20, 1986 (age 40); Fangshan, Beijing, China
- Occupations: Singer, musician
- Years active: 2003–Present

Chinese name
- Traditional Chinese: 趙雷
- Simplified Chinese: 赵雷
Transcriptions
Standard Mandarin
- Hanyu Pinyin: Zhào Léi
- Musical career
- Also known as: 赵小雷, 雷子
- Genre: folk
- Instruments: Vocals, guitar

Zhao Lei (simplified Chinese: 赵雷; traditional Chinese: 趙雷; pinyin: Zhào Léi, born 20 July 1986), is a Chinese folk singer and musician. He released his first record "赵小雷" (Zhao Xiaolei) in 2011, which includes the hit song "南方姑娘" (The Southern Girl).

== Early life ==
Zhao Lei was born on July 20, 1986. He learned to play the guitar in high school.

In 2003, Zhao Lei started his "underground singer" days with his guitar. He was a wandering singer, performing in pubs. At that time, Zhao Lei sang forty or fifty songs a day at the bar, earning 80 yuan per day.

In 2007, Zhao Lei traveled through China's Sichuan, Tibet and Yunnan areas, and on the way to travel, wrote the "开往北京的火车" (Train for Beijing) and "咬春" (Biting Spring) and other works. These experiences inspired his music.

Zhao Lei songs which are based on his own life, have captivated many fans and fellow musicians, including the Chinese singer and songwriter Liu Huan.

== Career ==
In 2009, Zhao Lei participated in a national tour of music, and founded the "Anti Beat" music studio in the same year.

On May 1, 2010 ~3, Zhao Lei attended the Beijing Strawberry Music Festival, Beijing "Mi Di" Music Festival and attracted attention; in August, he participated in the singing contest "Happy Boys" in Changsha singing songs such as "塔吉汗" (Tagihan) and "画" (Painting), so as to obtain the pass card, but his pass card was cancelled due to contractual issues. Zhao Lei moved to sing in Guangzhou, and the original songs "画" (Painting), "南方姑娘" (The Southern Girl), "雪人" (The Snowman) the success of the 20 cut, stop the 12 strong; September 22 was held in Beijing Fangshan Changyang Music Festival stage for the finale of the show dandelion.

In July 2011, Zhao Lei released his first album "赵小雷" (Zhao Xiaolei) with the album's title song being "南方姑娘" (The Southern Girl); 27–29 July, Zhao Lei attended the Zhangbei grassland Music Festival; December 4, Zhao Lei held his first solo album release in candy.

On September 20, 2012, Zhao Lei helped out Zhao Zhao personally "2012 new album "糙" (Rough) Beijing first concert and national tour" performance, and teacher "Zhao Zhao" chorus a song "北京的冬天" (Winter In Beijing) . 10–11 months, Zhao Lei as the founder of "10 wheel motorcycle tour", with Haozi, Xiaomeng, Guanqi, Xudong expansion motorcycle rock tour starting from Chengdu to Guangzhou is a way of 20 city, 30 days with 11 shows. In 2013, Zhao Lei made a solo tour of the 44 national tour, and the third stop on September 10 was held in Yantai's "small lighthouse cafe", which became the first solo concert in Yantai.

In January 2014, Zhao Lei participated in the "Sing My Song" to China folk singer's identity, the original song works "画" (Painting) was chosen by Liu Huan, and included in Liu Huan's original album "The New Nine" shot in; ~5 months of April, to participate in the "Yangtze River International Music Festival"; in May, Zhao Lei attended the Hong Kong Youth Music Festival, and Kay Tse， Jane Zhang, Jike Jun Yi, Reno Wang on the same stage. In the same year, she released her second album "吉姆餐厅" (Jim's Restaurant). On October 26, Zhao Lei brought his album to the national tour Shenyang Railway Station, and told the Jim Restaurant in the heart. In November, Zhao Lei released the album's first single "MV" of "我们的时光" (Our Time).

In January 2015, MINI month time series live wood Zhao Lei concert held in Shandong, Ji'nan - Zhao Lei concert concert; in September, Zhao Lei published a single "再也不会去丽江" (Never Go To Lijiang) in November, Zhao Lei; "我们的时光" (Our Time) National Theatre tour officially started, the history of two months, November 27 and November 29 XiAn Railway Station NanJing Railway Station ended. The show has a total of thirteen city; in December, by micro-blog music network named the "Year's Golden" and "Most Popular Music" title.

In March 2016, singer Wu Bai and a host of StreetVoice in Taiwan records, "大事发声" (Big Voice) StudioLive live online show first concert guests, within a week the performance of video on demand up to 14 million times.

On January 21, 2017, Zhao Lei released the album "无法长大" (Unable To Grow Up); in February, Zhao Lei joined the Hunan TV variety show "Singer" third period, as the fill singer singing the breakout success "成都" (Chengdu); on July 20, the creation of Zhao Lei's "Chengdu" won the first Prize for singing music song of the year award CMA. Zhao Lei proceeded to tour North America in November and December. This tour includes four cities, Los Angeles, Boston, New York and Chicago.

On February 4, 2017, Zhao Lei took part in the popular reality contestants singing show Singer 2017, the fifth series of I Am a Singer. He entered the competition under the 'Challenger' status on week three with his original song, 成都 (Chengdu), and placed second. His appearance of the show lasted for only three weeks due to lower placements (ranked 7th on week four (理想 (Ideal)), and last on week five (月亮粑粑 (The Moon Baba))). He could have participated in the Breakout Round on Week 11, however, Lei declined taking part because of his concert on March 23, clashing the taping date for the Breakouts.

On August 29, 2022, 6 years since his last album, Zhao Lei released the album "署前街少年" (Teen on Shuqian Street).

== Studio albums ==
=== 2011 赵小雷 (Zhao Xiaolei) ===
- 01 咬春(Biting Spring)
- 02 人家(The Others and Me)
- 03 未给姐姐递出的信(Letters Never Delivered to My Sister)
- 04 画(Painting)
- 05 不开的唇(Lips That Do Not Open)
- 06 赵小雷(Zhao Xiaolei)
- 07 南方姑娘(Southern Girl)
- 08 Over
- 09 开往北京的火车(Train for Beijing)
- 10 背影(Figure)
- 11 妈妈(Mother)
- 12 南方姑娘（弹唱）(Southern girl (acoustic version))
- 13 民谣(Folk)

=== 2014 吉姆餐厅 (Jim Restaurant) ===
- 01 吉姆餐厅(Jim Restaurant)
- 02 少年锦时(Juvenile Jin Time)
- 03 梦中的哈德森(Hudson in Dream)
- 04 我们的时光(Our Time)
- 05 理想(Ideal)
- 06 三十岁的女人(A Thirty-year-old Lady)
- 07 家乡(Hometown)
- 08 浮游(Floating Life)
- 09 小屋(Hut)
- 10 北京的冬天(Beijing's Winter)

=== 2016 无法长大 (Unable to Grow Up) ===
- 01 朵儿(Dorr)
- 02 玛丽 (Mary)
- 03 阿刁 (Diao)
- 04 鼓楼 (The Drum Tower)
- 05 孤独 (Left Alone)
- 06 成都 (Chengdu)
- 07 窑上路 (Yao-Shang Road)
- 08 无法长大 (Unable to Grow Up)
- 09 八十年代的歌 (Songs From the 80S)
- 10 再见北京 (Goodbye! Beijing!)

=== 2022 署前街少年 (Teen on Shuqian Street) ===
- 01 阿卜杜拉 (Abdullah)
- 02 小雨中 (In the Sprinkle)
- 03 少女 (Damsel)
- 04 凌晨计程车 (Taxi Before Dawn)
- 05 我记得 (I Remember)
- 06 船长 (Captain)
- 07 程艾影 (Cheng Aiying)
- 08 小行迹 (Little Trace)
- 09 三里屯的夜 (Nights at Sanlitun)
- 10 署前街少年 (Teen on Shuqian Street)

=== Single ===
- 青春无处安放(Youth Has No Place) 2012
- 让我偷偷看你(Let Me Peek At You) 2015
- 再也不会去丽江(Never go to Lijiang again) 2015
- 静下来(Calm Down) 2017
- 十九岁(At the Age of Nineteen) 2018
- 彩虹下面(Under the Rainbow) 2018
- 小人物(Small Figure) 2019

== Teacher ==
When Zhao Lei was 17 years old, sang in Hou Hai bar, he met Zhao Zhao. Zhao Zhao is a folk music singer, too. Zhao Zhao taught Zhao Lei much about folk music, and this experience influenced Zhao Lei a lot. Zhao Lei calls Zhao Zhao teacher.
