= Tan Jing =

Chinese singer

- Born: September 11, 1977 (age 49); Houma, Shanxi, China
- Education: China Conservatory of Music; People's Liberation Army Academy of Art; Beijing Foreign Studies University
- Occupation: Singer
- Years active: 1996 – present
- Spouse: Deng Zhonghan (m. 2009)
- Children: 1
- Parent(s): Tan Xinming (father); Zhou Liping (mother)
- Awards: Gold award of the Professional Pop category of the 9th National Young Vocalist Competition

Chinese name
- Traditional Chinese: 譚晶
- Simplified Chinese: 谭晶
Transcriptions
Standard Mandarin
- Hanyu Pinyin: Tán Jīng
- Musical career
- Genres: Mandapop, bel canto, Guoyue
- Member of: CPC Central Military Commission Political Department Song and Dance Troupe

Tan Jing (Chinese: 谭晶; born September 11, 1977) is a solo Chinese singer in the CPC Central Military Commission Political Department Song and Dance Troupe and a first class national actress. Her music blends bel canto, Chinese national music (Guoyue), and popular singing styles. She has been dubbed "The Voice of Harmony" for her efforts to spread Chinese music, culture, and goodwill through her professional and philanthropic contributions.

She has earned a Master's of Popular Music Studies, is an elected member of the 10th National People's Congress, currently serves as the Deputy Director of China's Pop Music Association and has been voted one of China's Top Ten Outstanding Youths.

Tan has also starred in the original national operas Ode to Mulan and The White Haired Girl, musicals Crazy Snow, Jasmine, and In That Distant Place, and other plays. Tan was a torchbearer for the 2008 Beijing Olympic Games and her song, Sky, was used to accompany the releasing of the doves during the Opening Ceremony. She took part in Chinese reality competition, in 2016, she appeared in the series finale on Jiangsu Television's Mask Singer. In January 2017, she participated in Hunan Television's Singer 2017, as one of the 1st round competitors, until her sudden withdrawal on February 25, 2017.

== Career ==
=== Early years ===
Tan grew up in a musical family in Houma, Shanxi Province, China. She started studying piano at the age of eight and gave her debut onstage performance when she was nine years old. She started singing lessons with her mother at age 11. After graduating from the Vocal Music Department of the Chinese Conservatory of Music in 1998, she was admitted to the Song and Dance Ensemble of the People's Liberation Army.

=== Rise to prominence ===
In 1996, Tan won first prize in the National New Singer Competition and took home the "Voice of Asia" International Grand Singer Award in 1997. She began performing as a solo singer in the Song and Dance Ensemble in 1998 and gained further recognition for winning second place at the Voice of Asia Music Competition in Kazakhstan where she represented China the same year. In 2000, she won the Professional Pop category of the BuBuGao National Young Vocalist Competition sponsored by CCTV and was honored as the Most Popular Singer. This year also marked her first appearance on the annual Spring Festival Gala.

=== Professional breakthrough ===
Tan held a successful solo concert of army songs at the Beijing Workers' Stadium in 2004. Her international breakthrough came in 2006, when she performed a solo concert at the Golden Hall in Vienna, Austria. In celebration of the 60th anniversary of the founding of the People's Republic of China, Tan held a solo concert on the Great Wall of China, becoming the first performer to do so. In 2011, she collaborated with Robert Wells, Glenn Hughes, Wynne Evans, and Blake to bring a set of her most famous songs in a blend of Chinese and Western styles to a sold out audience at the Royal Albert Hall in London.

=== Spokesperson ===
Tan often contributes to cultural activities and sporting events around the world. She performed during the closing ceremonies of the 15th Asian Games in Doha 2006. and the 2007 Special Olympics World Summer Games in Shanghai. As a spokesperson for the 2008 Olympic Games in Beijing she took part in the Olympic activities from beginning to end as a singer, torchbearer, and volunteer. Her song, Sky, was played during the releasing of the doves during the opening ceremony of the Olympic Games and she gave live performances during the closing ceremony of the Olympic Games and the opening ceremony of the Paralympic Games that summer. She also released a special Olympic album, from which Sky, Fly With You, and Let Me Have You became popular.

In 2010, Tan served as a volunteer spokesperson for the Shanghai World Expo, where she recorded the Expo's theme song, The World, performed during the opening ceremony, and held a large-scale public concert for the Expo volunteers. She held another concert as spokesperson for the 2010 Asian Games in Guangzhou, China. In 2011 she was appointed spokesperson for the World Horticulture Exposition in Xi'an, China. In 2012, she will serve as the spokesperson for UEFA, promoting the UEFA Champions League in China.

=== Singer 2017 ===
In January 2017, Tan joined the Hunan Television's singing competition Singer 2017, as one of eight first round competitors. On February 25, 2017, two days after the taping of week seven (Qualifying Round 3), she announced her withdrawal from the competition on Sina Weibo.

== Personal life ==
Tan is married to Deng Zhonghan, founder of Vimicro Corporation and an academician of the Chinese Academy of Engineering. She gave birth to a child in 2014.
