= Li Jian (singer) =

Chinese singer

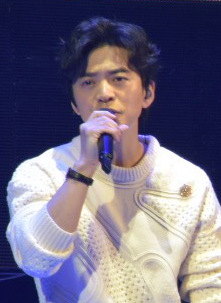
- Li in 2020
- Born: 23 September 1974 (age 51); Harbin, Heilongjiang, China
- Other names: 健哥 (Brother Jian); 音乐诗人 (The Poet of Music)
- Education: Tsinghua University (BE); Central Conservatory of Music
- Occupations: Singer; songwriter; producer
- Years active: 2001–present
- Spouse: Meng Xiao Bei
- Musical career
- Genres: Mandopop; folk
- Instruments: Vocals; piano; guitar
- Label: Wonderful Music Co. Ltd

Chinese name
- Chinese: 李健
Transcriptions
Standard Mandarin
- Hanyu Pinyin: Lǐ Jiàn

Li Jian (born 23 September 1974) is a Chinese singer best known for his poetic musical style. His career began as one of the two founding members of the band Shui Mu Nian Hua. After his departure from the band in 2002, he began his solo career. To date, he has produced nine albums. He is well known for his song "Chuan Qi" (Legend), which became a hit song after Chinese diva Faye Wong performed it on the 2010 Spring Gala.

In January 2015, Li took part in Hunan Television's I Am a Singer Season 3, as the first substitute singer, and finished as runner-up, losing to Han Hong. However, he exploded in popularity due to his personality and musical style. On 14 August 2015, Li was selected to be a team adviser for Team Na Ying on The Voice of China (season 4), along with A-mei, G.E.M., and JJ Lin. In March 2017, he returned to compete in the fifth season of I Am a Singer where he finished fourth. Between July and October 2018, Li served as a coach on the third season of Sing! China (a rebranded version of The Voice of China), where he became the winning coach on his season debut. In 2020, from August to November, he returned to Sing! China as a coach for its fifth season, ultimately winning a second time.

== Education ==
Li received a bachelor of engineering with a major in electrical engineering from Tsinghua University in 1998. While at Tsinghua, He took music courses at the Central Conservatory of Music.

== Discography ==
Album name	Release date
Si Shui Liu Nian	Sep 2003
Wei Ni Er Lai	Jan 2005
Thinking of You	Apr 2007
Ji Mo Xing Kong • Jian Ge	Oct 2008
Music of My Pride	22 December 2009
Yi Ran	10 December 2011
Shi Guang	23 September 2013
Li Jian	11 August 2015
Wu Shi Wu Ke	19 June 2021

== Accolades ==
Year	Accolades & Awards
2011	12–31 2011–2012 CCTV Over Year; 04-11 11th Music Feng Yun Award – Best Mainland China Artist, Best Producers; 03-19 18th Eastern Music Awards – Best Male Singer; 02-02 First time stepping into the Lunar New Year eve's special on China's TV station – CCTV
2012	08-21 11th CCTV-MTV Music Awards -Best Mainland China Artist of the Year
2013	02-09 Second time stepping into the Lunar New Year eve's special on China's TV station – CCTV
2014	06-01 2014 HITO Music Awards -Best Mainland China Artist, Cross-Boundary Album Awards; 05-21 25th Golden Melody Award – Nominated for the Best Album of the Year
2015	08-14 Selected to be the advisor for Team Na Ying on The Voice of China (season 4); 03-27 First Runner-up of the Chinese version of I Am a Singer
2016	04-03 Best Producer and Best Album for the album Li Jian at the Global Chinese Golden Chart Awards; 04-03 Twenty Golden Songs Award for "Beautiful as the Dawn" (美若黎明) at the Global Chinese Golden Chart Awards; 05-14 Nominated for Best Mandarin Male Singer at the 27th Golden Melody Awards.

== Variety shows ==
=== I Am a Singer Season 3 ===
In January 2015, Li took part in the third season of the Hunan Television's singing competition I Am a Singer, where he finished as the runner-up.

I Am a Singer Season 3 Li Jian's performance list
Episode	Broadcast date	Song Title	Original Singer	Ranking	Percentages of Votes	Remarks
4 (Qualifying Round 2)	23 January 2015	"貝加爾湖畔 On the Shores of Lake Baikal" (Mandarin)	Li Jian	3	19.22%	—
5 (Knockout Round 2)	30 January 2015	"在水一方 On the Water Side" (Mandarin)	Jiang Lei	4	14.01%	2nd place in Overall ranking
6 (Challenge Round 2)	6 February 2015	"袖手旁观 Stand By" (Mandarin)	Chyi Chin	3	20.11%	—
7 (Qualifying Round 3)	13 February 2015	"今天是你的生日，媽媽 It's Your Birthday Today, Mom" (Mandarin)	Zhong Lifeng	3	16.09%	—
8 (Knockout Round 3)	20 February 2015	"當你老了 When You Are Old" (Mandarin)	Zhao Zhao	1	22.20%	1st place in Overall ranking
9 (Challenge Round 3)	27 February 2015	"塵緣" (Mandarin)	Roman Tam	6	10.34%	—
10 (Qualifying Round 4)	6 March 2015	"月光 Moonlight" (Mandarin)	Yu Quan	2	17.63%	—
11 (Knockout Round)	13 March 2015	"陀螺 Gyro" (Mandarin)	Wan Xiaoli	5	9.45%	4th place in Overall ranking
12 (Breakout Round)	20 March 2015	"假如爱有天意The Classic" (Mandarin)	韓成民	1	25.44%	Breakout success (ranked 1st out of top four singers)
13 (Grand Finals- Round 1)	27 March 2015	"朋友第一" medley of "The Man Competing With Himself" (Mandarin) and "Friends" (Mandarin, Cantonese)	Jonathan Lee; Chyi Chin, Alan Tam	5	Unknown	Backup singer was Wu Xiubo
13 (Grand Finals- Round 2)	27 March 2015	"故鄉山川 Mountains and Rivers of Hometown" (Mandarin) "烏蘇裡船歌 Ussuri Boat Song" (Mandarin)	Li Jian; Hou Xu	2	33.06%	2nd place in Overall ranking (and runner-up of I Am a Singer 3)
14 (2015 Biennial Concert)	3 April 2015	"車站 Station" (Mandarin)	Akina Nakamori	—		

=== Singer 2017 ===
In March 2017, Li returned as a returning singer of the fifth season of I Am a Singer, which was renamed to Singer on that same season. He once again made it to the grand finals, this time finishing in fourth place.

Singer 2017 Li Jian's Performance list
Episode	Broadcast date	Song Title	Original Singer	Ranking	Percentages of Votes	Remarks
7 (Qualifying Round 4)	4 March 2017	"A Foreigner" (Mandarin)	Li Jian	2	18.88%	—
8 (Knockout Round 4)	11 March 2017	"A Father's Writers Poem" (Mandarin)	Xu Fei	2	19.98%	1st place in Overall ranking
9 (Challenge Round 4)	18 March 2017	"The 10:30 Train" (Mandarin)	Gary Xun	4	15.25%	—
10 (Knockout Round 5)	25 March 2017	"Red Bean" (Mandarin) "Eternal Love" (Mandarin)	Ye Mao; Shu Qi	4	16.04%	3rd place in Overall ranking
11 (Breakout)	1 April 2017	"Love Is Over" (Mandarin)	Ou Yang Fei Fei	1	20.04%	Breakout success (ranked 1st out of top seven singers)
12 (Semi-final)	8 April 2017	"一往情深的戀人" (Mandarin)	Li Jian	4	10.13%	—
13 (Finals)	15 April 2017	"Tripitaka In Daughter Country Lyrical To See Daughter king's Eyes" medley		4	12.35%	Backup singer is Yue Yunpeng; 4th place in Overall ranking Percentage of combined votes is 11.24%
13 (Finals)	15 April 2017	"The Daughter Of Love" (女儿情) (Mandarin)	Wu Jing	4	12.35%	Backup singer is Yue Yunpeng; 4th place in Overall ranking Percentage of combined votes is 11.24%
13 (Finals)	15 April 2017	"Tripitaka Lyrical" (唐僧抒怀) (Mandarin)	Chi Zhongrui	4	12.35%	Backup singer is Yue Yunpeng; 4th place in Overall ranking Percentage of combined votes is 11.24%
13 (Finals)	15 April 2017	"Your's Eyes" (你的眼睛) (Mandarin)	Panda Hsiung; Valen Hsu	4	12.35%	Backup singer is Yue Yunpeng; 4th place in Overall ranking Percentage of combined votes is 11.24%
14 (2017 Biennial Concert)	22 April 2017	"All of March" (三月的一整月) (Mandarin)	Tora Takemitsu	—		

== Personal life ==
Li wrote a song in 2005 to commemorate his father, who died due to cancer when Li was 31 years old.
