= Vimicro =

Chinese fabless chip company

Vimicro Corporation
- Type: Public (Nasdaq: VIMC)
- Industry: Semiconductor
- Founded: October 1999
- Founder: Deng Zhonghan
- Headquarters: Beijing, China
- Website: www.vimicro.com

Vimicro Corporation (Chinese: 中星微电子有限公司) is a Chinese fabless chip company which specializes in research and development and production and marketing of multimedia processors for personal computers (PCs) and mobile phones. It is headquartered in Haidian District, Beijing, China. It was founded in 1999 when the Chinese government invited a group of Chinese people who had been educated and had established careers in Silicon Valley to return to China to start a company. It was the first Chinese chip design company with proprietary technology to be listed on NASDAQ.

In 2018, Vimicro applied for an IPO with the China Securities Regulatory Commission, which was transferred in 2020 to the Shenzhen Stock Exchange ChiNext board to be reviewed. The review was then terminated in December 2020, when Vimicro withdrew the application and stated that it was for reasons of the changes to their business development plan in which chip businesses were merging. The reapplication was planned to happen when the time was right.
