= Jilin University of Arts =

- 吉林艺术学院
- Motto: 博学、求真、至善、尽美
- Type: Public
- Established: 1946
- President: Feng Boyang (冯伯阳)
- Location: Changchun, Jilin, China
- Campus: Urban
- Website: www.jlart.edu.cn

Jilin University of Arts (Chinese: 吉林艺术学院; pinyin: Jílín Yìshù Xúeyuàn) is a university in Changchun, Jilin, China.

== History ==
The Department of Music of Jilin Normal University (current Northeast Normal University) was spun off as Jilin Professional School of the Arts (吉林艺术专科学校). It was renamed to Jilin University of Arts in 1978.

== Alumni ==
- Liang Bo, winner of The Voice of China (season 1)
- Wang Shangsheng, painter
