= Liang Bo =

Liang Bo 梁博
- Born: March 25, 1991 (age 35); Jiutai, Jilin, China
- Origin: China
- Genres: Pop rock, Chinese rock
- Occupations: Singer-songwriter
- Instruments: Vocals; guitar; piano
- Years active: 2012 - present
- Website: showcitytimes.net

Liang Bo (Chinese: 梁博; pinyin: Liáng Bó; born March 25, 1991), also known as Bruce Liang, is a Chinese pop rock singer-songwriter. He was the champion of the first season of The Voice of China.

Liang was born in Jiutai, Changchun, Jilin in 1991. He completed his undergraduate study at the Popular Music School of Jilin College of the Arts from 2009 to 2013. He also holds a master's degree from Jilin College of the Arts.

Liang's self-titled debut album was released in April 2014. This album was recorded in the United States and co-produced by Michael Bearden, who is best known as Michael Jackson's final music director. Liang released his second album Mi Cang in November 2015. Recordings were done in one take.

Liang participated in the television program Singer 2017 as the final challenger of the season and was immediately eliminated for failing the challenge. In the breakout round, he was failed to qualify for the finals.

== Discography ==
=== Studio albums ===
Music/Lyrics: Liang Bo

Title	Release date	Songs
Liang Bo (梁博)	April 24, 2014	1. "Bu Zhi Qu Xiang" (不知去向); 2. "Jia Yuan" (家园); 3. "Ni De Wo De" (你的我的); 4. "Dang Wo Kao Jin Ni" (当我靠近你); 5. "Rang Hai Zi Huo Zai Meng Li" (让孩子活在梦里); 6. "Zhao Xun" (找寻); 7. "Xin De" (新的); 8. "Bruce Lee"; 9. "Yong Bu Zhi Bu" (永不止步); 10. "Mi Lu" (迷路); 11. "Xiang Ni" (想你); 12. "Wo Men" (我们)
Mi Cang (迷藏)	November 2, 2015	1. "Yong You" (拥有); 2. "Dian Dao Meng Xiang" (颠倒梦想); 3. "Rong Hua" (融化); 4. "Si Ji" (四季); 5. "Bian Le" (变了); 6. "Wei Xian" (危险); 7. "Bu Kan Yi Ji" (不堪一击); 8. "Ri Luo Da Dao" (日落大道)

=== Singles ===
Title	Year	Note
"Jian Chi" (坚持)	2011	
"Gai Fen Nu Hai Shi Wei Xiao" (该愤怒还是微笑)	2011	
"Bu Ran" (不染)	2012	
"Wan Mei Bu Wan Mei" (完美不完美)	2012	
"Yin Wei" (因为)	2012	
"Gei Wo Yi Dian Wen Du" (给我一点温度)	2016	
"Xi Ju" (喜剧)	2016	
"Gui" (鬼)	2016	
"Ling Hun Ge Shou" (灵魂歌手)	2016	
"Nan Hai" (男孩)	2017	
"Shadow" (影)	2018	Theme song of the movie "Shadow" directed by Zhang Yimou.

== Filmography ==
- In 2014, Liang starred in the documentary Rock On, 20.40.60 directed by Zuxin Hou (候祖辛).

Awards and achievements
Preceded by N/A	The Voice of China Winner; 2012	Succeeded by Li Qi
