= Terry Lin =

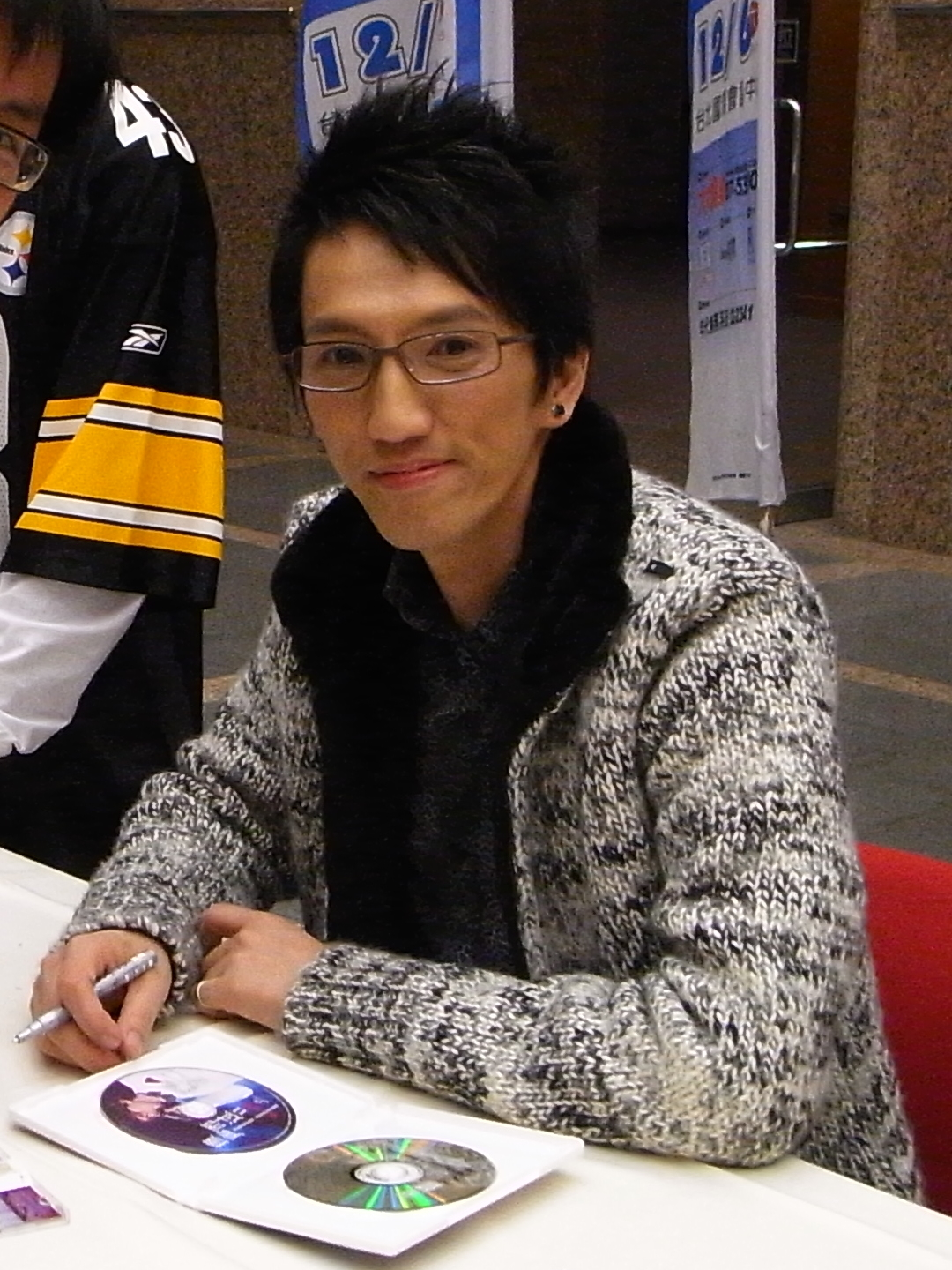
- Lin in 2008
- Born: 6 July 1966 (age 59); Keelung, Taiwan
- Years active: 1991–present
- Musical career
- Genres: Mandopop
- Instrument: Vocals
- Website: Official website

Terrance Lin (Chinese: 林志炫; pinyin: Lín Zhìxuàn; Wade–Giles: Lin^{2} Chih^{4}-hsuan^{4}; born 6 July 1966) is a Taiwanese singer. He has been nominated for the Golden Melody Awards 5 times for Best Mandarin Male Artist. He is known for his clear and elegant high voice, which utilizes different resonance in his head to 'mix' head voice and falsetto to effortlessly move to the high ranges and maintain power and volume despite his slight build. He has a combined range of 3 octaves but has spanned an additional octave while performing "Opera", a rearranged instrumental by Vitas, a song he stated he cannot practice (including perform) more than 4 times a day. He later became the first Taiwanese artist to record his album in One Take and One Take Live with no further editing.

== Life and career ==
Lin was born in Keelung, Taiwan, and is the oldest of 3 children. In 1991, as a university student, he formed the duo Ukulele with Lee Chi and gained attention in Taiwan and Hong Kong with their debut album "Confession" (認錯). The band made 4 Mandarin albums, 2 English cover albums, and a compilation album before disbanding in 1996. He was working at a power plant in a mine, but his colleague were all killed in a landslide, so he moved on to work in his father's family publishing company, for which he is still the equivalent of COO. In 1999, he was forced to leave the music industry to care for his mother. Nine months after the leave, his mother died, and the original publishing building was forced to rebuild due to a fire.

Lin went solo in 1995 and signed to Sony Music before setting up his own agency in 1997. In 2018, he sang Mo Dao Zu Shi's opening song "Drunken dreams of a past life".

== Influences ==
While Terry Lin is fluent in Taiwanese Hokkien, and his ancestry is in Hokkien, China, his father does not think it suits him as his voice and pronunciation are not compatible. Terry has covered songs from artists such as Steel Heart, Celine Dion, Queen, Air Supply, Vitas, Simon & Garfunkel, Ardian Rrusta. He cited Air Supply as one of his biggest influences.

== Philanthropy ==
Terry Lin has been the Chairman of Taiwan Cancer Hope Fund since his mother's passing in 2001, and was awarded HKMT (Hong Kong, Macau and Taiwan-wide) Top Philanthropist Award in 2013.

== Variety show ==
=== I Am a Singer Season 1 ===
In February 2013, he joined the first season of Hunan Television's I Am a Singer, where he finished runner-up.

I Am a Singer Season 1

I Am a Singer Season 1 Terry Lin's performance list
Episode	Broadcast Date	Song Title	Original Singer	Ranking	Percentages of Votes	Remarks
5 (Qualifying Round 3)	February 15, 2013	"沒離開過" (Mandarin)	Terry Lin	1	21.86%	—
6 (Knockout Round 3)	February 22, 2013	"Fade Away" (Mandarin)	Jay Chou	3	14.62%	2nd place in Overall ranking
7 (Qualifying Round 4)	March 1, 2013	"Opera"	Vitas	2	18.14%	—
8 (Knockout Round 4)	March 8, 2013	"你的眼神" (Mandarin)	Tsai Chin	1	27.25%	2nd place in Overall ranking
9 (Qualifying Round 5)	March 15, 2013	"Making Love Out of Nothing At All" (English)	Air Supply	1	27.15%	
10 (Knockout Round 5)	March 22, 2013	"夜夜夜夜" (Mandarin)	Chyi Chin	3	19.57%	5th place in Overall ranking
11 (Revival Round)	March 29, 2013	Exempted (did not perform that week)				
12 (Semi-finals)	April 5, 2013	"斷了線" (Mandarin) "Go Home" (Mandarin)	Mindy Quah; Shunza	2	17.44%	—
13 (Grand Finals- Round 1)	April 12, 2013	"Easy Lover" (English)	Phil Collins; Philip Bailey	2	15.60%	Backup singer was Jam Hsiao
13 (Grand Finals- Round 2)	April 12, 2013	"浮誇" (Mandarin)	Terry Lin	2	36.47%	2nd place in Overall ranking (and runner-up of I Am a Singer Season 1)

=== Singer 2017 ===
In February 2017, Lin returned as a returning singer of the fifth season of I Am a Singer, which was renamed to Singer on that same season. He once again made it to the grand finals, this time finishing in fifth place.

Singer 2017

Singer 2017 Terry Lin's performance list
Episode	Broadcast Date	Song Title	Original Singer	Ranking	Percentages of Votes	Remarks
5 (Challenge Round 3)	February 18, 2017	"You'd Never Know" (Mandarin)	Terry Lin	5	10.93%	—
6 (Knockout Round 3)	February 25, 2017	"Writing's On the Wall" (English)	Sam Smith	4	14.11%	4th place in Overall ranking
7 (Qualifying Round 4)	March 4, 2017	"Royal Dragon Ming Dynasty" (Mandarin)	Terry Lin	5	13.11%	—
8 (Knockout Round 4)	March 11, 2017	"Pearlised Curtains" (Mandarin) "Scarborough Fair" (English)	Henry Huo; Unknown	1	22.47%	2nd place in Overall ranking
9 (Challenge Round 5)	March 18, 2017	"Feeling Good" (English)	Cy Grant; Michael Buble	1	17.79%	—
10 (Knockout Round 5)	March 25, 2017	"Heartbreaker" (Mandarin) "Heaven Knows" (English)	Wang Leehom; Rick Price	7	8.92%	5th place in Overall ranking
11 (Breakout Round)	April 1, 2017	"You Are Just By The Corner" (Mandarin)	Bruno Pelletier	3	12.37%	Breakout Success (ranked 3rd out of top seven singers)
12 (Semi-finals)	April 8, 2017	"Somebody to Love" (English)	Queen	3	12.09%	—
13 (Finals)	April 15, 2017	"The Prayer" (English)	Andrea Bocelli; Celine Dion	5	9.48%	Backup singer was Hayley Westenra; 5th place in Overall ranking Percentage of combined votes is 10.78%
14 (2017 Biennial Concert)	April 22, 2017	"Leave" (Mandarin)	Jacky Cheung	—		

=== Call Me By Fire ===
In 2021, he joined the cast of Call Me By Fire as a contestant.
