= Singer season 9 =

Singer
- Season 9
- Hosted by: Cannon Hu（Main Rounds, Breakout Round, Final） He Jiong (Episodes 1-2, 4, 6-8, 10, Breakout Round, Final, The Ultimate Night); Shen Mengchen（Episode 2-3, The Ultimate Night） YELLOW（Episode 5 and 9） Silence Wang (Episode 5); Sun Nan (Episode 9)
- Judges: 500 on-site audience + 500 international online audience
- Winner: Na Ying
- Runner-up: Sitar Tan
- Finals venue: Hunan Broadcasting System
- No. of episodes: 13

Release
- Original network: Hunan Television
- Original release: May 10 – August 2, 2024

Season chronology
- ← Previous; Season 8 (2020) Next → Season 10 (2025)

The ninth season of Chinese television series Singer (Chinese: 歌手; previously titled I Am a Singer) was broadcast on Hunan Television and Mango TV between May and July 2024. Singer 2024 is produced by Hong Xiao, and its music director is Taiwanese senior musician George Chen Chien Chi. The season premiere was broadcast on May 10, 2024, and this was the third season to feature returning contestants, after season five and season eight. For the first time in this series, all episodes are broadcast live and follows the new rules of normal round and foreign guest challenge round. The season premiered on 10 May 2024, and ended on 2 August 2024.

Singer 2024 continues to gather famous singers of Greater China and other regions to participate. It has a total of 23 participating singers.

In the evening of 26 July 2024, Singer 2024, which lasted for more than three months, came to an end. In the end, Na Ying defeated other participating singers and is honoured as the winner of Singer 2024, Sitar Tan received the first runner-up, and Sun Nan received the second runner-up.

== Participating singers ==
=== Initial Singers ===
Participants	Country	Music Partner	Episode Joined	Episode Left	Result
Na Ying	China	Young	Episode 1 - First Opening Round	Episode 13 - The Ultimate Night	Winner
Faouzia Ouihya	Morocco-Canada	Li Jin Ye (Episode 1-4); Kandy Wong (Episode 5-13)	Episode 1 - First Opening Round	Episode 13 - The Ultimate Night	Fourth Place
Chanté Moore	United States	Cindy Yen	Episode 1 - First Opening Round	Episode 13 - The Ultimate Night	Fifth-Seventh Place
Silence Wang	China	Ma Xuan	Episode 1 - First Opening Round	Episode 12 - Final First Round	Fifth-Seventh Place
Hailai Ahmu	China	Lidia Liu (Episode 1-11); Zhang Yiyi (Episode 12)	Episode 1 - First Opening Round; Episode 11 - Breakout Round	Episode 3 - First Foreign Guest Challenge Round; Episode 12 - Final First Round	Fifth-Seventh Place
Rainie Yang	Taiwan	Leo Li (Episode 1-2) — (Episode 11)	Episode 1 - First Opening Round; Episode 11 - Breakout Round	Episode 2 - First Rising Singers Challenge Round; Episode 11 - Breakout Round	Withdrew from Breakout Round
Second Hand Rose	China	Zhao Yi Deng	Episode 1 - First Opening Round	Episode 2 - First Rising Singers Challenge Round	Withdrew from Breakout Round

=== Substitute Singers ===
Participant	Country	Music Partner	Previous Season Result	Episode Joined	Episode Left	Result
Sitar Tan	China	Zoelly Wu	Season 3 - Fourth-Sixth Place	Episode 8 - Third Opening Round (Final Opening Round)	Episode 13 - The Ultimate Night	First Runner-up
Sun Nan	China	Leo Li	Season 3 - Withdrew after Final First Round	Episode 4 - Second Opening Round	Episode 13 - The Ultimate Night	Second Runner-up

=== Rising Singers ===
Participants	Country	Music Partner	Episode Joined	Episode Left	Result
Rachel Zhang	China	Feng Qing	Episode 5 - Second Rising Singers Challenge Round; Episode 11 - Breakout Round	Episode 6 - Second Renowned Singers Challenge Round; Episode 11 - Breakout Round	Fourth Place in Breakout Round and Breakout Failure
YELLOW	Taiwan	Harry Guo	Episode 2 - First Rising Singers Challenge Round	Episode 11 - Breakout Round	Lost in Duel and Breakout Failure
Hanggai	China	Harry Guo (Episode 2); Su Mai Yue (Episode 3-5); Zhao Yi Deng (Episode 11)	Episode 2 - First Rising Singers Challenge Round; Episode 11 - Breakout Round	Episode 5 - Second Renowned Singers Challenge; Episode 11 - Breakout Round	Lost in Duel in Breakout Round and Breakout Failure
Xu Jun	China	Su Mai Yue	Episode 9 - Third Rising Singers Challenge Round (Final Rising Singers Challenge Round)	Episode 11 - Breakout Round	Lost in Duel and Breakout Failure
Fine Band	China	Feng Qing	Episode 5 - Second Rising Singers Challenge Round		Challenge Failure
C-BLOCK	China	Su Mai Yue	Episode 9 - Third Rising Singers Challenge Round (Final Rising Singers Challenge Round)		Challenge Failure

=== Renowned Singers ===
Participant	Country	Music Partner	Previous Season Result	Episode Joined	Episode Left	Result
Tia Ray	China	Aaron Zheng	Season 5-Seventh Place; Season 8-First Runner-up	Episode 6 - Second Renowned Singers Challenge Round; Episode 11 - Breakout Round	Episode 9 - Third Rising Singers Challenge Round (Final Rising Singers Challenge Round); Episode 11 - Breakout Round	Lost in Duel in Breakout Round and Breakout Failure
Laure Shang	China	Aaron Zheng	Season 1-Revival Failure in Revival Round	Episode 6 - Second Renowned Singers Challenge Round		Challenge Failure
Bird Zhang	China	Xiao Tu	—	Episode 7 - Third Renowned Singers Challenge Round		Challenge Failure
Ghost Huang	China	Xiao Tu	Season 8-Lost in Duel in Breakout Round and Breakout Failure	Episode 7 - Third Renowned Singers Challenge Round		Challenge Failure
Rukhiya Baidukinova	Kazakhstan	Aray Aydarhan	—	Episode 8 - Third Opening Round (Final Opening Round)		Challenge Failure

=== Foreign Guest ===
Participants	Country	Music Partner	Episode Joined	Episode Left	Result
Adam Lambert	United States	Lexie Liu	Episode 3 - First Foreign Guest Challenge Round		Challenge Success
Charlie Puth	United States	—			Withdrew from Second Foreign Guest Challenge Round due to schedule problems
Lenka Kripac	Australia	Lexie Liu	Episode 10 - Third Foreign Guest Challenge Round(Final Foreign Guest Challenge Round)		Challenge Failure

== Competition rules ==
=== Competition rules details ===
Singer 2024 has set up a brand new competition rules, which includes Rising Singers Challenge Round and Foreign Guest Challenge Round, overall a return to Singer 2018. There are three episodes in one round，with 500 on-site audience members and 500 online audience members voting in each episode. Each audience member selects 3 singers that they think performed the best in that round, but there are slight differences in the details.

== Results ==
Safe	First	Bottom	Eliminated	Performing Guest	Foreign Challenger	Rising Challenger; Renowned Challenger	Challenge Success	Challenge Failure	Breakout Success	Breakout Failure	Winner	Other Rank	Withdrawal

	Singer	Air Date（2024）												
	Singer	10 May	17 May	24 May	31 May	7 June	14 June	21 June	28 June	5 July	12 July	19 July	26 July	
	Singer	1st Round			2nd Round			3rd Round				Breakout Round	Final Round	
	Singer	Opening Round	Rising Singers Challenge Round	Foreign Guest Challenge Round	Opening Round	Rising Singers Challenge Round	Renowned Singers Challenge Round	Renowned Singers Challenge Round	Opening Round	Rising Singers Challenge Round	Foreign Guest Challenge Round	Breakout Round	1st Round	2nd Round
1	Na Ying	3	2	4	5	2	4	7	3	5	1	—	—	1
2	S3 Sitar Tan	—	—	—	—	—	—	—	1	2	6	2	—	2
3	S3 Sun Nan	—	—	—	2	1	1	4	5	4	3	1	—	3
4	Faouzia Ouihya	2	1	1	3	3	2	2	2	1	2	—	—	4
5	Chanté Moore	1	3	3	1	4	3	1	4	8	4	—	—	—
6	Silence Wang	4	5	6	4	6	6	5	6	6	7	—	—	—
7	Hailai Ahmu	7	4	7	—	—	—	—	—	—	—	3	—	—
8	Rachel Zhang	—	—	—	—	—	7	—	—	—	—	4	—	—
9	YELLOW	—	—	2	6	5	5	3	8	3	8	—	—	—
10	Xu Jun	—	—	—	—	—	—	—	—	—	5	—	—	—
11	S5 S8 Tia Ray	—	—	—	—	—	—	6	7	7	—	—	—	—
12	Hanggai	—	—	5	7	7	—	—	—	—	—	—	—	—
13	Rainie Yang	6	6	—	—	—	—	—	—	—	—	—	—	—
14	Second Hand Rose	5	7	—	—	—	—	—	—	—	—	—	—	—
15	C-BLOCK	—	—	—	—	—	—	—	—	—	—	—	—	—
16	Rukhiya Baidukinova	—	—	—	—	—	—	—	—	—	—	—	—	—
17	S8 Ghost Huang	—	—	—	—	—	—	—	—	—	—	—	—	—
18	Bird Zhang	—	—	—	—	—	—	—	—	—	—	—	—	—
19	S1 Laure Shang	—	—	—	—	—	—	—	—	—	—	—	—	—
20	Fine Band	—	—	—	—	—	—	—	—	—	—	—	—	—
21	Adam Lambert	—	—	check	—	—	—	—	—	—	—	—	—	—
22	Lenka Kripac	—	—	—	—	—	—	—	—	—	X mark	—	—	—
23	Charlie Puth	—	—	—	—	—	—	—	—	—	—	—	—	—

Note：
1. Results are according to the broadcast of Hunan Television and Mango TV.
2. As a result of Charlie Puth's withdrawal due to schedule problems, the Second Foreign Guest Challenge Round was replaced by Renowned Singers Challenge Round.

== Competition details ==
=== First round ===
==== Opening Round ====
Episode 1 is the first round of competition for Singer 2024, which is also the first opening round. It was broadcast live on 10 May 2024 at 20:00 CST.

Singer 2024 First Opening Round 10 May 2024 Hosts: He Jiong, Cannon Hu
Order	Singer	Music Partner	Song Title	Original Singer	Lyricist	Composer	Arranger	Rank
1	Faouzia Ouihya	Li Jin Ye	"Crazy"	Gnarls Barkley	Brian Burton; Thomas Callaway; Gian Franco Reverberi; Gian Piero Reverberi		Liv Wang; Huang Shao Yong; George Chen Chien Chi	2
2	Hailai Ahmu	Lidia Liu	"你的万水千山"	Hailai Ahmu			Blackie Wu	7
3	Rainie Yang	Leo Li	"带我走 Take Me Away"	Rainie Yang	Wu Qing-feng		Nick Pyo	6
4	Na Ying	Young	"默"	Na Ying	Yin Yue	Qian Lei		3
5	Silence Wang	Ma Xuan	"想到我们"	Silence Wang	Wan Yi	Silence Wang	GenioMao; Jin Ruo Chen	4
6	Chanté Moore	Cindy Yen	"If I Ain't Got You"	Alicia Keys			Chen Mudi	1
7	Second Hand Rose	Zhao Yi Deng	"耍猴尔"	Liang Long			Second Hand Rose	5

==== Rising Singers Challenge Round ====
Episode 2 is the second round of competition for Singer 2024, which is also the first rising singers challenge round. It was broadcast live on 17 May 2024 at 20:00 CST. Both Hanggai and YELLOW were successful in their challenge against Chanté Moore and Silence Wang respectively.

Singer 2024 First Rising Singers Challenge Round 17 May 2024 Hosts: He Jiong, Cannon Hu
Order	Singer	Music Partner	Song Title	Original Singer	Lyricist	Composer	Arranger	Rank
1	Chanté Moore	Cindy Yen	"Superwoman"	Karyn White	L.A. Reid; Babyface; Daryl Simmons		Nick Pyo	3
2	Hanggai	Harry Guo	"轮迴"	Hanggai				Challenge Success
3	Silence Wang	Ma Xuan	"血肉"^{[a]}	Chih Siou			Jason Gu	5
4	YELLOW	Harry Guo	"独上C楼"	YELLOW; Mavis Fan	Yao Chun-Min	YELLOW	YELLOW; Allen Yu	Challenge Success
5	Second Hand Rose	Zhao Yi Deng	"嫂子颂"	Li Na	Li Wenqi	Zhang Qianyi	Second Hand Rose	7
6	Hailai Ahmu	Lidia Liu	"难道"	Yu Quan	Chen Yufan		Dong Jianjian	4
7	Rainie Yang	Leo Li	"不为谁而作的歌 A Song Unwritten for Anyone"	JJ Lin	Eric Lin	JJ Lin	Chen Mudi	6
8	Na Ying	Young	"挣脱"	Trady	Wang Haitao	Trady	Ofgary Zhang	2
9	Faouzia Ouihya	Li Jin Ye	"Set Fire to the Rain"	Adele	Adele; Fraser T. Smith		Blackie Wu; Morris Pang	1

a. The lyrics of the spoken parts of the song were rearranged by Silence Wang himself.

==== Overall ranking ====
As a result of the challenge success of both rising singers, Rainie Yang and Second Hand Rose are eliminated.

Singer 2024 First Round Overall Ranking
Rank	Singer	Opening Round Percentages of Votes (Rank)	Rising Singers Challenge Round Percentages of Votes (Rank)	Overall Percentages of Votes
1	Faouzia Ouihya	20.53% (2)	27.81% (1)	24.17%
2	Chanté Moore	29.92% (1)	17.00% (3)	23.46%
3	Na Ying	19.10% (3)	26.80% (2)	22.95%
4	Silence Wang	11.44% (4)	9.70% (5)	10.57%
5	Hailai Ahmu	4.39% (7)	10.58% (4)	7.49%
6	Second Hand Rose	8.58% (5)	3.12% (7)	5.85%
7	Rainie Yang	6.05% (6)	4.98% (6)	5.52%

==== Foreign Guest Challenge Round ====
Episode 3 is the third round of competition for Singer 2024, which is also the first foreign guest challenge round. It was broadcast live on 24 May 2024 at 20:00 CST. Adam Lambert was successful in his challenge against Na Ying, which resulted in the elimination of Hailai Ahmu.

Singer 2024 First Foreign Guest Challenge Round 24 May 2024 Hosts: Cannon Hu, Shen Mengchen
Order	Singer	Music Partner	Song Title	Original Singer	Lyricist	Composer	Arranger	Rank
1	Chanté Moore	Cindy Yen	"Saving All My Love for You"	Whitney Houston	Michael Masser; Gerry Goffin		Chen Mudi	3
2	Hanggai	Su Mai Yue	"酒歌"	Mongols Folk Song			Hanggai	5
3	YELLOW	Harry Guo	"思念"	Tanya Chua			YELLOW; Allen Yu	2
4	Hailai Ahmu	Lidia Liu	"流浪"	Zhao Muyang			Huang Xiannong	7
5	Silence Wang	Ma Xuan	"蚂蚁筑起高塔"	Yang Shuyan; TIBIBI	Ma Xiaobo	M Mei	Flash Piggy; Jin Ruo Chen	6
6	Adam Lambert	Lexie Liu	"Whataya Want from Me"	Adam Lambert	Max Martin; Alecia Moore; Karl Schuster		Kyle Lu	Challenge Success
7	Na Ying	Young	"到时见"	Azora Chin	Xiaohan	Qian Lei	Guo Xiaofeng; Liu Zhuo	4
8	Faouzia Ouihya	Li Jin Ye	"Desert Rose"	Sting; Cheb Mami	Sting; Cheb Rabah		Kenn C Shuon Tsai	1

===== Percentages of votes =====
Singer 2024 First Foreign Guest Challenge Round Percentages of Votes
Rank	Singer	Percentages of Votes
1	Faouzia Ouihya	29.16%
2	YELLOW	18.23%
3	Chanté Moore	16.15%
4	Na Ying	14.74%
5	Hanggai	9.92%
6	Silence Wang	9.40%
7	Hailai Ahmu	2.40%

=== Second round ===
==== Opening round ====
Episode 4 is the fourth round of competition for Singer 2024, which is also the second opening round. It was broadcast live on 31 May 2024 at 20:00 CST. The first substitute singer Sun Nan from Singer season 3 joins the competition. It is free song choice for Silence Wang and Faouzia Ouihya and the range of song choice for the rest of the singers is popular hits.

Singer 2024 Second Opening Round 31 May 2024 Hosts: He Jiong, Cannon Hu
Order	Singer	Music Partner	Song Title	Original Singer	Lyricist	Composer	Arranger	Rank	Singer Rehearsal Vote
1	YELLOW	Harry Guo	"印地安老斑鸠 Ancient Indian Turtledove"	Jay Chou	Vincent Fang	Jay Chou	YELLOW Huang; Allen Yu; Sam Wu; Wade Hsiao	6	—
2	Hanggai	Su Mai Yue	"狼"	Chyi Chin			Hanggai; Bi Jianbo	7	—
3	Faouzia Ouihya	Li Jin Ye	"Paparazzi"	Lady Gaga	Lady Gaga; Rob Fusari		Chen Mudi; Cai Yichen	3	1 ^{[a]}
4	Silence Wang	Ma Xuan	"雨天雨天"组曲^{[b]}				Jin Ruo Chen; GenioMao	4	—
4	Silence Wang	Ma Xuan	"雨天"	Stephy Qi	Silence Wang		Jin Ruo Chen; GenioMao	4	—
4	Silence Wang	Ma Xuan	"雨天 Rainy Day"	Stefanie Sun	Xiaohan	Paul Lee Wei Shiong	Jin Ruo Chen; GenioMao	4	—
5	Na Ying	Young	"搁浅 Step Aside"	Jay Chou	Devon Song	Jay Chou	Liu Zhuo	5	3 ^{[c]}
6	Chanté Moore	Cindy Yen	"Wrecking Ball"	Miley Cyrus	Maureen McDonald; Stephan Moccio; Sacha Skarbek; David Kim; Lukasz Gottwald; Henry Russell Walter		Li Daxu	1	1 ^{[a]}
7	Sun Nan	Leo Li	"拯救"	Sun Nan	Liang Mang	Zhou Di^{[d]}	Huang Xiannong	2	2^{[e]}

a. Singer rehearsal vote tied at first place.
b. Prelude includes Clair de lune from Claude Debussy.
c. Singer rehearsal vote third place.

d. Also the on-site electric guitarist.
e. Singer rehearsal vote second place.

==== Rising Singers Challenge Round ====
Episode 5 is the fifth round of competition for Singer 2024, which is also the second rising singers challenge round. It was broadcast live on 7 June 2024 at 20:00 CST. Rachel Zhang was successful in her challenge against YELLOW while Fine Band fails in their challenge against Sun Nan. It is free song choice for Na Ying and YELLOW Huang and the range of song choice for the rest of the singers is popular hits. Chanté Moore, whose rank was Number 1 in the second normal round, can choose her own performing order.

Singer 2024 Second Rising Singers Challenge Round 7 June 2024 Hosts: Cannon Hu, Silence Wang, YELLOW Huang
Order	Singer	Music Partner	Song Title	Original Singer	Lyricist	Composer	Arranger	Rank
1	Silence Wang	Ma Xuan	"你在，不在 Are You There"^{[a]}	Amber Kuo	Daryl Yao	Jackey Rao	James Yeo	6
2	Hanggai	Su Mai Yue	"鸿雁"^{[b]}	Erguna Band	Lü Yanwei	Urad folk song	Hanggai; Bi Jianbo	7
3	Faouzia Ouihya	Kandy Wong	"I Wanna Dance With Somebody"	Whitney Houston	George Merrill; Shannon Rubicam		Kong Xiaoyi	3
4	YELLOW	Harry Guo	"手拖手 Hand in Hand"	Khalil Fong	Khalil Fong; Liang Rulan	Khalil Fong	YELLOW Huang; Allen Yu	5
4	YELLOW	Harry Guo	"Isn't She Lovely"	Stevie Wonder			YELLOW Huang; Allen Yu	5
5	Rachel Zhang	Feng Qing	"Black Sheep"	Gin Wigmore	Gin Wigmore; Butch Walker		John Laudon	Challenge Success
6	Na Ying	Young	"灿烂的你"^{[c]}	Wang Feng			Jia Yinan; Guo Xiaofeng	2
7	Sun Nan	Leo Li	"悬崖"	Chyi Chin	Adam Hsu	Tommy Ji	Huang Xiannong	1
8	Fine Band	Feng Qing	"呼吸决定"	Fine Band	Liu Guannan		Steven Lai	Challenge Failure
9	Chanté Moore	Cindy Yen	"Hello"	Adele	Adele; Greg Kurstin		Chen Mudi	4
9	Chanté Moore	Cindy Yen	"Rumour Has It"	Adele	Adele; Ryan Tedder		Chen Mudi	4

a. Silence Wang himself is the lyricist and composer for the bridge of the song.

b. Performed in Mongolian.

c. Original song choice for second normal round.

==== Overall ranking ====
As a result of the challenge success of one rising singer, Hanggai is eliminated.

Singer 2024 Second Round Overall Ranking
Rank	Singer	Opening Round Percentages of Votes (Rank)	Rising Singers Challenge Round Percentages of Votes (Rank)	Overall Percentages of Votes
1	Sun Nan	25.96% (2)	22.05% (1)	24.01%
2	Chanté Moore	27.46% (1)	16.55% (4)	22.01%
3	Faouzia Ouihya	17.15% (3)	18.40% (3)	17.78%
4	Na Ying	8.57% (5)	20.25% (2)	14.41%
5	YELLOW	7.61% (6)	9.58% (5)	8.60%
6	Silence Wang	8.96% (4)	8.11% (6)	8.54%
7	Hanggai	4.29% (7)	5.07% (7)	4.68%

==== Renowned Singers Challenge Round ====
Episode 6 is the sixth round of competition for Singer 2024, which is also the second renowned singers challenge round. It was broadcast live on 14 June 2024 at 20:00 CST. It was originally the second foreign guest challenge round, but was replaced by the renowned singers challenge round after Charlie Puth withdraw due to schedule problems. The second renowned singers challenge round follows the rules of rising singers challenge round, except that the renowned singers can only challenge the top four ranked singers in the second round overall ranking. Laure Shang fails in her challenge against Faouzia Ouihya while Tia Ray was successful in her challenge against Chanté Moore, which resulted in the elimination of Rachel Zhang. It is free song choice for Sun Nan and Rachel Zhang and the range of song choice for the rest of the singers is popular hits.

Singer 2024 Second Renowned Singers Challenge Round 14 June 2024 Hosts: He Jiong, Cannon Hu
Order	Singer	Music Partner	Song Title	Original Singer	Lyricist	Composer	Arranger	Rank
1	Na Ying	Young	"忘不了"	Angus Tung			Liu Zhuo; Rigen Mo; Zhu Mai Wen	4
2	Faouzia Ouihya	Kandy Wong	"Cry Me a River"	Justin Timberlake	Justin Timberlake; Timothy Mosley; Scott Storch		Chen Mudi	2
3	Laure Shang	Aaron Zheng	"归途有风"	Faye Wong	Tang Tian	Qian Lei	Yu Wei	Challenge Failure
4	Silence Wang	Ma Xuan	"奢香夫人"^{[a]}	Phoenix Legend	Zhang Chao		Jin Ruo Chen; Rong Zihao	6
5	YELLOW	Harry Guo	"你的甜蜜"	Mavis Fan	Michelle Chen		YELLOW Huang; Allen Yu; Sam Wu; Wade Hsiao	5
6	Rachel Zhang	Feng Qing	"是日救星 You Made My Day"	Lala Hsu		Lala Hsu; Bernard Zheng	Johnny Yim	7
7	Sun Nan	Leo Li	"人是_"	Charlie Zhou	Tang Tian	Qian Lei	Guo Xiaofeng; John Zhang	1
8	Chanté Moore	Cindy Yen	"This Love"	Maroon 5	Adam Levine; Jesse Carmichael		Kenn C	3
9	Tia Ray	Aaron Zheng	"At Last"	Glenn Miller	Mack Gordon; Harry Warren		Terence Hsieh; Derrick Sepnio	Challenge Success
9	Tia Ray	Aaron Zheng	"BORED"	Tia Ray	Khris Riddick-Tynes; Tia Ray; Jordan Powers; Kam Glasper	Khris Riddick-Tynes; Tia Ray; Jordan Powers; Ali Prawl	Terence Hsieh; Derrick Sepnio	Challenge Success
9	Tia Ray	Aaron Zheng	"Crazy in Love"	Beyoncé; Jay-Z	Beyoncé; Rich Harrison; Eugene Record; Jay-Z		Terence Hsieh; Derrick Sepnio	Challenge Success

a. The rap part of the song is composed by Silence Wang himself.

===== Percentages of votes =====
Singer 2024 Second Renowned Singers Challenge Round Percentages of Votes
Rank	Singer	Percentages of Votes
1	Sun Nan	20.95%
2	Faouzia Ouihya	20.79%
3	Chanté Moore	19.47%
4	Na Ying	14.66%
5	YELLOW	13.28%
6	Silence Wang	6.24%
7	Rachel Zhang	4.60%

=== Third round ===
==== Renowned Singers Challenge Round ====
Episode 7 is the seventh round of competition for Singer 2024, which is also the third renowned singers challenge round. It was broadcast live on 21 June 2024 at 20:00 CST. Both Bird Zhang and Ghost Huang failed in their challenge against Sun Nan and Faouzia Ouihya respectively. It is free song choice for Na Ying and Faouzia Ouihya and the range of song choice for the rest of the singers is popular hits.

Singer 2024 Third Renowned Singers Challenge Round 21 June 2024 Hosts: He Jiong, Cannon Hu
Order	Singer	Music Partner	Song Title	Original Singer	Lyricist	Composer	Arranger	Rank
1	Na Ying	Young	"突然想念"	Jin Zhiwen	Wang Yaoguang	Cuikey Cui	Cuikey Cui; Wang Zhichao; Liu Zhuo	7
2	Sun Nan	Leo Li	"有一种悲伤 A Kind of Sorrow"	A-Lin	Gavin Lin	Alex Chang Jien	John Zhang	4
3	Bird Zhang	Xiao Tu	"说谎"^{[a]}	Jeff Chang	Voter Hsu	Hsu Wei Ming	Chen Mudi	Challenge Failure
4	Tia Ray	Aaron Zheng	"Dear Friend"	Shunza	Chien Yao	Kōji Tamaki	Terence Hsieh; Prince Zione; Deng Yilun	6
5	YELLOW	Harry Guo	"Lemon Tree"	Tarcy Su	Adam Hsu	Peter Freudenthaler; Volker Hinkel	YELLOW Huang; Allen Yu; Sam Wu; Wade Hsiao	3
5	YELLOW	Harry Guo	"Lemon Tree"	Fools Garden	Peter Freudenthaler; Volker Hinkel	Peter Freudenthaler; Volker Hinkel	YELLOW Huang; Allen Yu; Sam Wu; Wade Hsiao	3
5	YELLOW	Harry Guo	"Don't Worry, Be Happy"	Bobby McFerrin			YELLOW Huang; Allen Yu; Sam Wu; Wade Hsiao	3
6	Faouzia Ouihya	Kandy Wong	"Love on the Brain"	Rihanna	Fred Ball; Joseph Angel; Rihanna		Chen Mudi	2
7	Ghost Huang	Xiao Tu	"星辰大海"^{[b]}	Ghost Huang	Wen Liang; Qu Ziqian; Liu Tao	Qu Ziqian; Liu Tao	Mark	Challenge Failure
8	Chanté Moore	Cindy Yen	"Never Enough"	Loren Allred	Benj Pasek; Justin Paul		Nick Pyo	1
9	Silence Wang	Ma Xuan	"傻瓜"	Landy Wen	Kenji Wu		Jason Gu	5

a. The humming part of the song is "白月光" from Jeff Chang.

b. Interlude includes "Honor of Kings" Doria, Heino CP Song "Mermaid Song", humming part of the song is "打开" from Ghost Huang herself.

===== Percentages of votes =====
Singer 2024 Third Renowned Singers Challenge Round Percentages of Votes
Rank	Singer	Percentages of Votes
1	Chanté Moore	21.84%
2	Faouzia Ouihya	19.36%
3	YELLOW	16.52%
4	Sun Nan	13.37%
5	Silence Wang	10.53%
6	Tia Ray	9.50%
7	Na Ying	8.89%

==== Opening Round (Final Opening Round) ====
Episode 8 is the eighth round of competition for Singer 2024, which is also the third opening round (Final Opening Round). It was broadcast live on 28 June 2024 at 20:00 CST. The final substitute singer Sitar Tan from Singer Season 3 joins the competition. The final opening round combines the rules of opening round and renowned singers challenge round, except that the number of renowned singers reduces from two to one. Rukhiya Baidukinova fails in her challenge against Sun Nan. It is free song choice for Chanté Moore and Na Ying and the range of song choice for the rest of the singers is popular hits, as Faouzia Ouihya originally draws out free song choice but volunteered to switch with Chanté Moore after she confirmed her song choice beforehand.

Singer 2024 Third Opening Round (Final Opening Round) 28 June 2024 Hosts: He Jiong, Cannon Hu
Order	Singer	Music Partner	Song Title	Original Singer	Lyricist	Composer	Arranger	Rank
1	Silence Wang	Ma Xuan	"听见下雨的声音"	Queen Wei	Vincent Fang	Jay Chou	Chen Mudi	6
2	YELLOW	Harry Guo	"Close to You"	The Carpenters	Burt Bacharach; Hal David		YELLOW Huang; Allen Yu	8
2	YELLOW	Harry Guo	"沙滩 Blue Moon"	David Tao	Wa Wa	David Tao	YELLOW Huang; Allen Yu	8
3	Sun Nan	Leo Li	"无言感激"^{[a]}	Alan Tam	Siu Mei	Hayato Kanbayashi; Shen Zede	Huang Xiannong; John Zhang	5
3	Sun Nan	Leo Li	"给所有知道我名字的人"	Chief Chao	Jonathan Lee	Liu Tianjian	Huang Xiannong; John Zhang	5
4	Rukhiya Baidukinova	Aray Aydarhan	"All by Myself"	Eric Carmen		Eric Carmen; Serge Rachmaninoff	Tang Sen	Challenge Failure
5	Faouzia Ouihya	Kandy Wong	"来自天堂的魔鬼 Away"	G.E.M			Jade Wu; GenioMao	2
6	Chanté Moore	Cindy Yen	"The Best"	Bonnie Tyler	Mike Chapman; Holly Knight		Blackie Wu	4
7	Na Ying	Young	"一颗星的夜"	Azora Chin	Jin Cancan	Qian Lei		3
8	Tia Ray	Aaron Zheng	"二十二 22"	David Tao	David Tao; Wa Wa	David Tao	Prince Zione; Deng Yilun	7
8	Tia Ray	Aaron Zheng	"Officially Missing You"	Tamia	Marcus Vest		Prince Zione; Deng Yilun	7
9	Sitar Tan	Zoelly Wu	"兰花花儿"	Sitar Tan	Dong Yufang; Rama Liu	Rama Liu		1

a. The performance alternates between Cantonese and Mandarin, Sun Nan himself is the lyricist for the Mandarin part of the song.

==== Final Rising Singers Challenge Round ====
Episode 9 is the ninth round of competition for Singer 2024, which is also the third rising singers challenge round (Final Rising Singers Challenge Round). It was broadcast live on 5 July 2024 at 20:00 CST. C-BLOCK failed in their challenge against Faouzia Ouihya while Xu Jun was successful in his challenge against Tia Ray. It is free song choice for Sun Nan and Sitar Tan and the range of song choice for the rest of the singers is popular hits, as Chanté Moore originally drew out free song choice, but switched with Sitar Tan afterwards.

Singer 2024 Third Rising Singers Challenge Round (Final Rising Singers Challenge Round) 5 July 2024 Hosts: Cannon Hu, Sun Nan, YELLOW
Order	Singer	Music Partner	Song Title	Original Singer	Lyricist	Composer	Arranger	Rank
1	Sitar Tan	Zoelly Wu	"人间道"	Liu Huan	Tang Tian	Peng Fei	Wang Jiamin; Zhou Jie; Liu Jianing	2
2	Na Ying	Young	"如果你也听说"	A-Mei	Francis Lee	Jay Chou	Liu Zhuo^{[a]}	5
3	Sun Nan	Leo Li	"地心"	Wang Feng			Huang Xiannong	4
4	Chanté Moore	Cindy Yen	"Halo"	Beyoncé	Ryan Tedder; Evan Bogart	Ryan Tedder; Evan Bogart; Beyoncé	GenioMao; Chen Mudi	8
5	Faouzia Ouihya	Kandy Wong	"Grenade"	Bruno Mars	Bruno Mars; Philip Lawrence; Ari Levine; Brody Brown; Claude Kelly; Andrew Wyatt		Shuon Tsai	1
6	C-BLOCK	Su Mai Yue	"江湖流"	C-BLOCK; GAI		Key.L; GAI	Karl Rogers	Challenge Failure
7	Silence Wang	Ma Xuan	"小小虫"	Khalil Fong	FAMA	Khalil Fong	Jin Ruo Chen; Zeng Yi	6
7	Silence Wang	Ma Xuan	"如果爱"	Khalil Fong	Khalil Fong; Vivian Hsu	Khalil Fong	Jin Ruo Chen; Zeng Yi	6
8	Tia Ray	Aaron Zheng	"Déjà Vu"	Beyoncé; Jay-Z	Rodney Jerkins; Delisha Thomas; Makeba Riddick; Keli Nicole Price; Jay-Z	Rodney Jerkins; Beyoncé	Jonathan Fields; Earl Minor	7
8	Tia Ray	Aaron Zheng	"火 Fire"	A-Mei	A-Mei; Alexander Leehom Wang	Alexander Leehom Wang	Jonathan Fields; Earl Minor	7
9	Xu Jun	Su Mai Yue	"29"	Xu Jun			Xu Jun; Hu Chen; Guo Liang; Yi Yang	Challenge Success
10	YELLOW	Harry Guo	"小镇姑娘 Small Town Girl"	David Tao			YELLOW Huang; Allen Yu; Sam Wu; Wade Hsiao	3
10	YELLOW	Harry Guo	"I Don't Need No Doctor"	Ray Charles	Jo Armstead; Nickolas Ashford; Valerie Simpson		YELLOW Huang; Allen Yu; Sam Wu; Wade Hsiao	3

a. Also the on-site pianist.

==== Overall ranking ====
As a result of the challenge success of one rising singer, Tia Ray is eliminated.

Singer 2024 Third Round Overall Ranking
Rank	Singer	Opening Round (Final Opening Round) Percentages of Votes (Rank)	Rising Singers Challenge Round (Final Rising Singers Challenge Round) Percentages of Votes (Rank)	Overall Percentages of Votes
1	Sitar Tan	19.93% (1)	16.79% (2)	18.36%
2	Faouzia Ouihya	18.69% (2)	17.97% (1)	18.33%
3	Na Ying	16.75% (3)	11.03% (5)	13.89%
4	Sun Nan	11.23% (5)	13.05% (4)	12.14%
5	YELLOW	6.06% (8)	16.25% (3)	11.16%
6	Chanté Moore	13.29% (4)	6.82% (8)	10.06%
7	Silence Wang	7.88% (6)	10.44% (6)	9.16%
8	Tia Ray	6.17% (7)	7.65% (7)	6.91%

==== Final Foreign Guest Challenge Round ====
Episode 10 is the tenth round of competition for Singer 2024, which is also the third foreign guest challenge round (Final Foreign Guest Challenge Round). It was broadcast live on 12 July 2024 at 20:00 CST. Lenka Kripac fails in her challenge against Silence Wang. It is free song choice for YELLOW and Sun Nan and the range of song choice for the rest of the singers is popular hits, as Faouzia Ouihya originally draws out free song choice, but switches with Sun Nan afterwards.

Singer 2024 Third Foreign Guest Challenge Round(Final Foreign Guest Challenge Round)12 July 2024 Hosts: He Jiong, Cannon Hu
Order	Singer	Music Partner	Song Title	Original Singer	Lyricist	Composer	Arranger	Rank
1	Sitar Tan	Zoelly Wu	"蒙古人"	Tengger	Qi Qimude	Tengger	Liu Jianing	6
2	Chanté Moore	Cindy Yen	"Because of You"	Kelly Clarkson	Kelly Clarkson; David Hodges; Ben Moody		Steven Lai	4
3	Faouzia Ouihya	Kandy Wong	"Reflection"	Lea Salonga	David Zippel	Matthew Wilder	Chen Mudi	2
3	Faouzia Ouihya	Kandy Wong	"自己"	Coco Lee	Chien Yao	Matthew Wilder	Chen Mudi	2
4	Lenka Kripac	Lexie Liu	"Trouble Is a Friend"	Lenka Kripac	Thomas Salter; Lenka Kripac		Terence Hsieh; Euywein Yong; Blackie Wu	Challenge Failure
5	Silence Wang	Ma Xuan	"氧气"	Mavis Fan	Adam Hsu	Huang Yi	Jason Gu	7
6	YELLOW	Harry Guo	"恋爱，俘虏"	Julia Peng	Chen Hongyu; YELLOW Huang	YELLOW Huang	YELLOW Huang; Allen Yu	8
7	Sun Nan	Leo Li	"给给"	Ma Tiao			Guo Junjiang; John Zhang	3
8	Xu Jun	Su Mai Yue	"克卜勒"	Stefanie Sun	Hush		Xu Jun	5
8	Xu Jun	Su Mai Yue	"垂髫"	Xu Jun			Xu Jun	5
9	Na Ying	Young	"裹着心的光 Light Of Sanctuary"	JJ Lin	Kevin Yi	JJ Lin	Liu Zhuo; Guo Xiaofeng	1

===== Percentages of votes =====
Singer 2024 Third Foreign Guest Challenge Round (Final Foreign Guest Challenge Round) Percentages of Votes
Rank	Singer	Percentages of Votes
1	Na Ying	19.09%
2	Faouzia Ouihya	17.83%
3	Sun Nan	13.80%
4	Chanté Moore	13.11%
5	Xu Jun	11.15%
6	Sitar Tan	10.59%
7	Silence Wang	8.44%
8	YELLOW	5.99%

=== Breakout round ===
Episode 11 is the eleventh round of competition for Singer 2024, which is also the breakout round for eliminated singers, substitute singers, rising and renowned singers successful in their challenge. It was broadcast live on 19 July 2024 at 20:00 CST. After going through three rounds of competition, Na Ying, Faouzia Ouihya, Chanté Moore and Silence Wang advances to the Final. Hailai Ahmu, Hanggai, Rachel Zhang, Tia Ray, Xu Jun,Sitar Tan, Sun Nan and YELLOW enters the Breakout Round and is competing for the three breakout spots in the final. Second Hand Rose member Liang Long entrust the programming team on 17 July to issue a statement on their behalf that they are no longer participating in Breakout Round due to personal schedule problems. Rainie Yang issued a statement on 18 July that she is unable to participate in the final due to schedule conflict. Her Breakout Round performance was a guest performance, not involved in audience voting and not counted in the competition to qualify for the Final. The eight singers will be split into four groups of two singers duel, each of the four safe singers form groups in a 1v1 duel relationship with eliminated singers by drawing lots, A pick one out of two voting is held immediately after both singers in every group duel have performed to determine the winning singer, the losing singer with lower percentages of votes will be eliminated immediately and will not qualify for the final (Breakout Failure) while the winning singers will have opportunity for breakout success. After the performance of all eight singers have ended, the Breakout outcome will be determined by conducting another pick three out of four voting among all the four groups of winning singers in their respective duel and the top 3 ranked singers successfully advances to the final (Breakout Success). For the competition this episode, the group appearance order depend on the duration of the safe singer, in which they are safe, in the group is determined by the order from short to long in terms of the number of episodes. The greater the number of safe episodes, the order of performance for the group will be later and the appearance order in a group is that the safe singer appear and perform later. Ultimately, Sun Nan, Sitar Tan and Hailai Ahmu successfully breakout. During this episode of the show, the programming team have provided temporary music partner again for the original singer corresponding to the music partner who returned after being eliminated (indicated in the following table in italics).

Singer 2024 Breakout Round 19 July 2024 Hosts: He Jiong, Cannon Hu
Order	Singer	Music Partner	Song Title	Original Singer	Lyricist	Composer	Arranger	Rank
1	Rainie Yang	—	"泪桥 Tear Bridge"	Wubai&China Blue	Wu Bai		Steven Lai	Guest Performance
2	Rachel Zhang	Feng Qing	"What's Up?"	4 Non Blondes	Linda Perry		Da Ri Dan^{[a]}	4
3	Xu Jun	Su Mai Yue	"白鸽 White Dove"	Wubai&China Blue	Wu Bai		Xu Jun	—
4	Tia Ray	Aaron Zheng	"夜来香Flow Like A Flower" ^{[b]}	Tia Ray		Tia Ray; Shilei Chang	Chace Zhu	—
5	Sitar Tan	Zoelly Wu	"缘分一道桥"	Alexander Leehom Wang; Sitar Tan	Vincent Fang	Alexander Leehom Wang	Zhou Di; Liu Jianing	2
6	Hanggai	Zhao Yi Deng	"四季"	Ordos City Folk Song			Hanggai	—
7	Sun Nan	Leo Li	"悟空傳"	Zhao Yingjun	Jin He Zai; Zhao Yingjun	Zhao Yingjun	Guo Xiaofeng; John Zhang	1
8	Hailai Ahmu	Lidia Liu	"长子"	JIHU			Liu Zhuo; Fu Yizheng; Jin Rui	3
8	Hailai Ahmu	Lidia Liu	"不要怕"	Waqi Yihe	Moxi Zishi		Liu Zhuo; Fu Yizheng; Jin Rui	3
9	YELLOW	Harry Guo	"我要的幸福 My Desired Happiness"	Stefanie Sun	Matthew Yen	Paul Lee Wei Shiong	YELLOW Huang; Allen Yu; Sam Wu; Wade Hsiao	—
9	YELLOW	Harry Guo	"Hey Jude"	The Beatles	Lennon–McCartney		YELLOW Huang; Allen Yu; Sam Wu; Wade Hsiao	—

a. Also the on-site pianist.

b. Original Name"Love Herby"

==== Duel outcome ====
Singer 2024 Breakout Round Duel Outcome
Order	Singer	Outcome
1	Rachel Zhang	Won in Duel
1	Xu Jun	Lost in Duel and Breakout Failure
2	Tia Ray	Lost in Duel and Breakout Failure
2	Sitar Tan	Won in Duel
3	Hanggai	Lost in Duel and Breakout Failure
3	Sun Nan	Won in Duel
4	Hailai Ahmu	Won in Duel
4	YELLOW	Lost in Duel and Breakout Failure

===== Percentages of votes =====
Singer 2024 Breakout Round Percentages of Votes
Rank	Singer	Percentages of Votes
1	Sun Nan	31.98%
2	Sitar Tan	30.38%
3	Hailai Ahmu	20.30%
4	Rachel Zhang	17.34%

=== Final ===
Episode 12 is the twelfth round of competition for Singer 2024, which is also the final. It was broadcast live on 26 July 2024 at 19:30 CST. The final is divided into two rounds and consists of the first round and the second round. The first round of the final being a duet segment and the second round being a solo performance.

==== First round ====
The first round of the final is a duet segment, with every singer inviting a guest singer for a duet together and is conducted in the way of a group battle. Seven singers will be divided into three groups: Faouzia Ouihya and Hailai Ahmu, Sun Nan and Sitar Tan, Chante Moore and Na Ying and Silence Wang, each group can consist of not less than two and not more than three singers, a voting is held within each group immediately after the performance of each group have ended, the singer who obtained the highest percentages of votes in each group advances to the second round and be the first in the group to be winner contender. After the performance of all seven singers in this round have ended, all pending singers will be going through voting again to decide the fourth singer advancing to the second round and the fourth winner contender. During the live stream of the press conference to announce the competition rules, the seven groups of singers have expressed in order their own preference of their groupings according to their personal historical results and rankings (number of times ranked first in single round) in the main round. After the groupings are completed, the three groups each have chosen a representative to draw lots to determine the appearance order of their group for the first round of the final competition, while the appearance order of first or later within each group is determined by Weibo user online voting outcome and will based on number of votes to determine the order of appearance, the appearance order of the singer with the higher number or percentages of votes is later and the singer will appear later. The situation and outcome of the final grouping is indicated and reflected as follows in the following table.

Singer 2024 Final First Round 26 July 2024 Hosts: He Jiong, Cannon Hu
Order	Singer	Music Partner	Guest Singer	Song Title	Original Singer	Lyricist	Composer	Arranger	Outcome
Group 1
1	Hailai Ahmu	Zhang Yiyi ^{[a]}	Zhang Lei	"故乡"	Xu Wei			Zhu Mai Wen; Liu Zhuo	Pending
2	Faouzia Ouihya	Kandy Wong	Jason Zhang	"Shallow"	Lady Gaga; Bradley Cooper	Lady Gaga; Andrew Wyatt; Anthony Rossomando; Mark Ronson		Nick Pyo	Advanced to the Second Round and First Winner Contender
Group 2
3	Sun Nan	Leo Li	Liu Huan	"我在"	Liu Huan			John Zhang; Guo Xiaofeng; Guo Junjiang	Advance to the second round and Second Winner Contender
3	Sun Nan	Leo Li	Liu Huan	"带着地球去流浪"	Liu Huan			John Zhang; Guo Xiaofeng; Guo Junjiang	Advance to the second round and Second Winner Contender
4	Sitar Tan	Zoelly Wu	Chen Chusheng	"瞎子"	Yao Shisan	Zaixia Biming; Dong Yufang	Renjian Xiaowo	Zhou Di; Liu Jianing	Pending
Group 3
5	Chanté Moore	Cindy Yen; Aray Aydarhan	Dimash	"Lose Control"	Teddy Swims	Teddy Swims; Joshua Coleman; Julian Bunetta; Marco Antonio Rodriguez-Diaz, Jr. John Sudduth		Terence Hsieh; Chase Jackson; Diana Lizhao Xiyue	Pending
6	Silence Wang	Ma Xuan	Leo Ku	"放·逐"	Silence Wang	Chow Yiu-fai	Silence Wang	Kiddou Guo	Pending
7	Na Ying	Young	YOUNG DAN	"鲜花"	YOUNG DAN	Liu Ximeng		YOUNG DAN; Ju Jian	Advance to the second round and Third Winner Contender

a. Due to filming of Season 6 of"Divas Hit The Road", Lidia Liu travels to Chile while leaving it for Zhang Yiyi to serve as the substitute music partner.

In this round, Faouzia Ouihya, Sun Nan, Na Ying directly advance to the second round after group performance have ended, the remaining four singers enter the pending zone. Ultimately, Sitar Tan gets the first place in the voting segment for the pending singers, and obtains the fourth advancement spot.

Singer 2024 Final First Round 26 July 2024 Hosts: He Jiong, Cannon Hu
Order	Singer	Music Partner	Guest Singer	Song Title	Original Singer	Lyricist	Composer	Arranger	Outcome
1	Hailai Ahmu	Zhang Yiyi ^{[a]}	Zhang Lei	"故乡"	Xu Wei			Zhu Mai Wen; Liu Zhuo	Did not advance to the second round
2	Sitar Tan	Zoelly Wu	Chen Chusheng	"瞎子"	Yao Shisan	Zaixia Biming; Dong Yufang	Renjian Xiaowo	Zhou Di; Liu Jianing	Advance to the second round and Fourth Winner Contender
5	Chanté Moore	Cindy Yen; Aray Aydarhan	Dimash	"Lose Control"	Teddy Swims	Teddy Swims; Joshua Coleman; Julian Bunetta; Marco Antonio Rodriguez-Diaz Jr. John Sudduth		Terence Hsieh; Chase Jackson; Diana Lizhao Xiyue	Did not advance to the second round
6	Silence Wang	Ma Xuan	Leo Ku	"放·逐"	Silence Wang	Chow Yiu-fai	Silence Wang	Kiddou Guo	Did not advance to the second round

a. Due to filming of Season 6 of"Divas Hit The Road", Lidia Liu travels to Chile while leaving it for Zhang Yiyi to serve as the substitute music partner.

==== Second round ====
The second round of the final is a solo performance. Voting is held immediately after the performance of all four singers that advance to the second round and winner contenders have ended to decide and produce the winner this season. The rehearsal version of the second round song performance of Hailai Ahmu, Silence Wang, Chanté Moore, who did not advance to the second round, was released online on Mango TV after the conclusion of the live broadcast of the final for SVIP users to watch on demand anytime.

Singer 2024 Final Second Round 26 July 2024 Hosts: He Jiong, Cannon Hu
Order	Singer	Music Partner	Song Title	Original Singer	Lyricist	Composer	Arranger	Outcome
—	Hailai Ahmu	Zhang Yiyi	"阿果吉曲"	Hailai Ahmu			—	—
—	Chanté Moore	Cindy Yen	"It's Alright"	Chanté Moore	Chanté Moore; Vassal Benford		—	—
—	Silence Wang	Ma Xuan	"流沙 Everything's Gone"	David Tao	Wa Wa	David Tao	—	—
1	Faouzia Ouihya	Kandy Wong	"RIP, Love"	Faouzia Ouihya	Jakke Erixson; Fransisca Hall; Faouzia Ouihya		Chen Mudi	4
2	Sitar Tan	Zoelly Wu	"川江号子"	Sitar Tan	Dong Yufang; Rama Liu	Rama Liu	Rama Liu; Liu Jiuyou; Monster. Z	2
3	Na Ying	Young	"像梦一样自由"	Wang Feng			Guo Xiaofeng	1
4	Sun Nan	Leo Li	"滴水一生"	Sun Nan	Tang Tian	Sun Nan	Guo Junjiang; John Zhang	3

==== The King of Singer ====
Before the overall result is obtained and told, the host announces that the Ultimate Winner Contender is Sitar Tan and Na Ying. Ultimately, Na Ying defeats Sitar Tan's 24.95% percentages of votes with a vote superiority of 39.13%, and was awarded the winner of Singer 2024.

Singer 2024 The King Of Singer Percentages Of Votes
Rank	Singer	Percentages Of Votes
1	Na Ying	39.13%
2	Sitar Tan	24.95%
3	Sun Nan	19.28%
4	Faouzia Ouihya	16.64%

=== The Ultimate Night ===
Episode 13 is the thirteenth round of competition for Singer 2024, which is also “The Ultimate Night”. It was broadcast live on 2 August 2024 at 19:30 CST. A total of ten singers participated in Singer 2024 “The Ultimate Night”, including singers representing past seasons, Susan Huang, Victor Wong, Dimash, Tengger and Chyi Yu as well as this season's Na Ying, Sitar Tan, Sun Nan, Faouzia Ouihya and Chanté Moore.

Singer 2024 The Ultimate Night 2 August 2024 Hosts: He Jiong, Shen Mengchen
Order	Singers Group	Singer	Music Partner	Song Title	Original Singer	Lyricist	Composer	Arranger	Outcome (Winning Team)
Group 1
1	Team Season 9 Singers	Sun Nan	Leo Li	"给所有朋友们的歌"	Sun Nan	Sun Nan; Dong Yufang; Liang Mang; Han Bing	Sun Nan	Huang Xiannong	Team Season 9 Singers
2	Team Past Seasons Singers	Victor Wong	—	"不是因为天气晴朗才爱你"	Bestards	Kidding Qiu		Blackie Wu	Team Season 9 Singers
Group 2									Team Season 9 Singers
3	Team Season 9 Singers	Chanté Moore	Cindy Yen	"I'm What You Need"	Chanté Moore	Donald Parks; Emanuel Officer; John Howcott		Blackie Wu; Shuon Tsai	Team Season 9 Singers
4	Team Past Seasons Singers	Susan Huang	—	"我的美丽"	Susan Huang	Mushroom Li	Mushroom Li; Sedar Chin	Sedar Chin; Shuon Tsai	Team Season 9 Singers
Group 3									Team Season 9 Singers
5	Team Past Seasons Singers	Tengger	—	"草原之夜"	Meng Guibin	Zhang Jiayi	Tian Ge	Song Yang	Team Season 9 Singers
6	Team Season 9 Singers	Faouzia Ouihya	Kandy Wong	"ICE"	Faouzia Ouihya	Faouzia Ouihya; Kristen Carpenter; Inverness		—	Team Season 9 Singers
Group 4									Team Season 9 Singers
7	Team Season 9 Singers	Sitar Tan	—	"似花似火"	Sitar Tan	Dong Yufang	Rama Liu		Team Season 9 Singers
8	Team Past Seasons Singers	Dimash	Aray Aydarhan	"Angel Love"	Dimash	Kalkaman Sarin; Lin Wei	Renat Gaissin	Erlan Bekchurin; Renat Gaissin	Team Season 9 Singers
Group 5									Team Season 9 Singers
9	Team Past Seasons Singers	Chyi Yu	—	"Vincent"	Don McLean			Tu Ying	Team Season 9 Singers
10	Team Season 9 Singers	Na Ying	Young	"生命之河"	Faye Wong; Na Ying	Song Tao; Zhang Ji	Song Tao	Zhu Mai Wen; Liu Zhuo	Team Season 9 Singers

==== "Music In Joy" Special Performance ====
Episode 13 also features the special performances of Alexia Evellyn, Bian Yinghua and Shanren Band from "Music In Joy".

Singer 2024 The Ultimate Night "Music In Joy" Special Performance 2 August 2024 Hosts: He Jiong, Shen Mengchen
Order	Singers Group	Singer	Song Title	Original Singer	Lyricist	Composer	Arranger
11	"Music In Joy" Singers	Alexia Evellyn	"Varanda"	Alessandra Leão			Alexia Evellyn; Fraser MacColl
12	"Music In Joy" Singers	Bian Yinghua	"Arirang"	Koreans Folk Song			M-Brothers
13	"Music In Joy" Singers	Shanren Band	"上山下"	Shanren Band	Qu Zihan		Shanren Band; Jason Gu

==== Outcome ====
Singer 2024 "The Ultimate Night" Percentages of Votes
Singers Group	Percentages of Votes
Team Season 9 Singers	59.81%
Team Past Seasons Singers	40.19%

== Broadcast Platforms ==
The season will begin airing on 10 May 2024, with the "Countdown to the Stage" segment airing every Friday at 19:45 CST and the show broadcast live every Friday at 20:00 CST on both Hunan TV and Mango TV. During the live broadcast, Mango TV will simultaneously provide live camera footage from the Singer's Home and live individual camera footage of each singer. Mango TV subscribers can also watch the "Advanced Show" segment on demand every Thursday at 12:00 CST. It will be broadcast exclusively through the Mango TV International APP (MangoTV) for foreign countries. The audio copyrights were acquired by Tencent Music Entertainment Group, NetEase Cloud Music and ByteDance, and jointly released through QQ Music, KuGou Music, Kuwo Music, NetEase Cloud Music and Soda Music. All the songs in this season's competition are available in both live and collection's edition versions.

Malaysia's Astro QJ and Singapore's HUB E City will broadcast this season's program live every Friday at 20:00 CST, simultaneously with Hunan TV and Mango TV, starting 10 May.

== Accolades ==
Year	Award Ceremony	Award Category	Nomination	Result	Note
Year 2025	30th Shanghai Television Festival	Best Variety Show Award	《Singer 2024》	Nominated	
Year 2025	30th Shanghai Television Festival	International Communication Award（Variety Show Category）	《Singer 2024》	Won	

== Publicity activity ==
Broadcast Time	Activity	Participating Singers
20 July 2024	Hello Saturday	Chanté Moore, Sun Nan, Kandy Wong
