= Stage Boom =

Chinese reality TV show

- Traditional Chinese: 爆裂舞台
- Simplified Chinese: 爆裂舞台
- Literal meaning: Explosive Stage
- Hanyu Pinyin: bào liè wǔ tái
- Genre: Reality
- Directed by: Zhou Qing; Li Junxian
- Presented by: Han Hong
- Starring: Lexie Liu; Shan Yichun; Song Yuqi; An Qi; Lu Keran; Vava; Wu Xuanyi; Yamy; Chen Zhuoxuan; Zhou Jieqiong
- Country of origin: China
- Original language: Mandarin
- No. of seasons: 1
- No. of episodes: 12

Production
- Executive producer: Jiang Bin
- Producers: Chen Gang; Liu Wei; Tong Tong
- Camera setup: Multi-camera
- Running time: 60 minutes
- Production company: iQiyi

Original release
- Network: iQiyi
- Release: August 5 – October 22, 2021

Stage Boom (Chinese: 爆裂舞台; pinyin: bào liè wǔ tái) is a 2021 Chinese music talent survival reality show that was broadcast on iQiyi from August 5 to October 22, 2021. The show is led by Han Hong, gathering ten talented female musicians - Lexie Liu, Shan Yichun, Song Yuqi, An Qi, Lu Keran, Vava, Wu Xuanyi, Yamy, Chen Zhuoxuan, Zhou Jieqiong - who have already debuted but lack a chance on stage. Together, they create top-notch and epic stage performances. The Boom girls will compete through battles. In the end, one “Boom Icon” will be determined and given the top resources in the industry.

== Mentors ==
Name	Role	Notes
Han Hong	Host, Mentor	
Jin Wugang	Mentor	Music Director, Music Producer
Qu Shicong	Mentor	Music Producer
Kong Xiaoyi K.I.X	Mentor	Music Producer

== Boom Girls ==
Color Key

- Eliminated in Episode 5
- Eliminated in Episode 9
- Eliminated in Episode 10
- Eliminated in Episode 12
- Final Boom Icon

Name	Date of birth	Company	Notes
Yamy	October 7, 1991 (age 34)	JC Universe Entertainment	Former Rocket Girls 101 Member; The Rap of China Contestant; Produce 101 China Contestant
Wu Xuanyi / Betty Wu	January 26, 1995 (age 31)	Yuehua Entertainment	Former WJSN Member; Former Rocket Girls 101 Member; Produce 101 China Contestant
Vava**	October 29, 1995 (age 30)	Yes Entertainment	The Rap of China Contestant; Sound of My Dream Contestant
Lu Keran	November 7, 1995 (age 30)	TOV Entertainment, Idol Youth Entertainment	Fanxy Red Member; Former THE9 Member; Youth With You (Season 2) Contestant
An Qi	May 13, 1996 (age 30)	Starmaster Entertainment, Idol Youth Entertainment	Hickey Member; Former THE9 Member; Youth With You (Season 2) Contestant
Chen Zhuoxuan	August 13, 1997 (age 28)	New Style Media Group, Wajijiwa	SuperGirl 2016 Contestant; Former BonBon Girls 303 Member; Produce Camp 2020 Contestant
Zhou Jieqiong	December 16, 1998 (age 27)	Zhou Jieqiong Studio	Former I.O.I Member; Produce 101 Contestant; Former PRISTIN Member
Lexie Liu*	December 21, 1998 (age 27)	Guangding Cultural Media	The Rap of China Contestant
Song Yuqi***	September 23, 1999 (age 26)	Cube Entertainment, Ichi Entertainment	(G)I-dle Member
Shan Yichun	December 23, 2001 (age 24)	ByMoon Entertainment	Sing! China 2020 Winner

=== Notes ===
*Resurrected in Episode 10

**Eliminated in Episode 5

***Eliminated in Episode 7

== Episodes ==
=== Episode 1 (5 August 2021) ===
==== 90 Seconds Initial Stage Performance ====
For the initial stage performance, the Boom girls will each have 90 seconds to perform a song. After every performance, the rest of the girls will rate the performances by raising their hands to signal that they liked the performance.

An Qi and Yamy, having gotten the most likes, had the opportunity of deciding the other girls' part of the song "VVS", which would be the theme song for the show.

90 Seconds Initial Stage Performance
Stage Order	Name	Song	Original Artist	Votes
Opening Stage	XXXL	《我不是你们说的AKA憨肥》	XXXL	NIL
1	Yamy	Drop it	Yamy	9
2	An Qi	Yea	An Qi	9
3	Shan Yichun	R&B All Night	KnowKnow、Higher Brothers	6
4	Song Yuqi	Lion(Chinese Ver.)	(G)I-DLE	6
5	Chen Zhuoxuan	Open	Huang Xiaoyun	7
6	Lu Keran	I Need A Bad Girl	Lil’Akin	6
7	Zhou Jieqiong	PICK ME	I.O.I, PRODUCE 101	5
8	Betty Wu	Pink Blue Sunset	Betty Wu	7
9	Lexie Liu	Quizas, Quizas, Quizas	Nat King Cole	8
10	Vava	Pose	Vava	8

=== Episode 2 (12 August 2021, 13 August 2021) ===
==== VVS Mission ====
For this mission, the Boom girls will be given 12 hours to finish practising the theme song and film a one-take music video for the song.

The final result of the mission will decide who get to perform on the stage for the first competition, which will only have a total of nine performances.

MV Parts
Name	Chosen Part(s)	Final Part	Elimination Votes
Lexie Liu	D, F	K	1
Song Yuqi	D	D	0
Lu Keran	K, H	H	0
Betty Wu	B	B	1
Chen Zhuoxuan	D, E	E	0
Shan Yichun	B, D, F, J	J	5
An Qi	A	A	0
Vava	I	I	0
Yamy	C	C	0
Zhou Jieqiong	E, F	F	2

=== Episode 3 (20 August 2021) ===
==== First Competition Stage ====
After the VVS mission, the Boom girls voted for who they thought did the worst during the mission. Shan Yichun received the most votes, and was thus unable to perform on stage for first competition. Instead, she will have to perform in the Boom Base.

For this competition, two Boom girls will battle each other. They are to choose their opponents; whoever have the most challengers will have priority in choosing their challenger. There will also be no elimination this round.

First Competition Stage
Stage Order	Name	Song	Original Artist	Mentor Votes	Audience Votes	Professional Votes	Total votes
Opening Stage	XXXL	《我的人设被吹成了小说》	XXXL	NA			
1	Betty Wu	I Want Us Together	Fan Xiaoxuan	2	89	13	104
1	An Qi	Annoyed	Lin Xiaopei	3	110	24	137
2	Lu Keran	Go Astray	G.U.T.S	2	101	11	114
2	Lexie Liu	Penrose Metropolis	Lexie Liu	3	120	28	151
3	Vava	Play	Jolin Tsai	1	92	14	107
3	Yamy	Beijing Journey	Yamy	2	97	23	122

=== Episode 4 (27 August 2021) ===
==== First Competition Stage ====
First Competition Stage
Stage Order	Name	Song	Original Artist	Mentor Votes	Audience Votes	Professional Votes	Total votes
4	Chen Zhuoxuan	Exists?	G.E.M	4	118	20	142
4	Song Yuqi	Giant	Song Yuqi	3	133	21	157
5	Shan Yichun	You'll Never Know	J.Sheon	3	126	25	154
5	Zhou Jieqiong	Obviously	Eric Chou	2	84	11	97

==== Quiz Stage ====
For this mission, the Boom girls will work in pairs. The pairs will also collaborate in the next competition. The five winners of the first competition had the benefit of choosing their partners. Zhou Jieqiong and Betty Wu, both of whom lost the competition and were the remaining girls left unpicked, were grouped together automatically.

The pairs will have four hours to prepare a short performance for the song "It's The Time". They are given three versions of the songs to choose from, which are Version A—dance version, Version B—rock version, and Version C—rap version.

After every performance, the performing pair will be assessed by the mentors based on the completeness of the performance, the cooperation between the pair and their personal breakthrough. The final result of the mission will decide which pairs get to perform on the stage for the second competition, which will only have a total of four performances.

Quiz Stage
Stage Order	Name	Song Version	Fan Signs	Results
1	Yamy & Shan Yichun	It's The Time(Version A)	1	Pass
2	Chen Zhuoxuan & Lu Keran	It's The Time(Version A)	4	Pass
3	Song Yuqi & Vava	It's The Time(Version A)	4	Fail
4	Betty Wu & Zhou Jieqiong	It's The Time(Version A)	4	Pass
5	An Qi & Lexie Liu	It's The Time(Version B)	4	Pass

=== Episode 5 (3 September 2021) ===
==== Second Competition Stage ====
After the quiz stage, it is decided that Song Yuqi and Vava's pair will be not perform on stage. Instead they will perform in the Boom Base.

This competition will be the first elimination round. After every performance, the on-site voters will be able to vote for either a single, both or none of the girls in the pair. The total individual votes of each girl will then be added up to form the total team votes. The two lowest-ranking pairs will be eliminated.

After the competition, the two lowest-ranking pairs came out to be Zhou Jieqiong and Betty Wu's pair, and Song Yuqi and Vava's pair. Thus, they are eliminated. However, it is revealed that the girl with the highest individual votes within the two lowest-ranking pairs will not be eliminated, so Song Yuqi avoided elimination.

Second Competition Stage
Stage Order	Name	Song	Original Artist	Mentor Votes	Audience Votes	Professional Votes	Total Individual Votes	Total Team Votes	Results
1	Chen Zhuoxuan	Jungle Juice	Fox Fu Kasi	4	97	23	124	257	Pass
1	Lu Keran	Jungle Juice	Fox Fu Kasi	3	107	23	133	257	Pass
2	Betty Wu	Have You Heard Lately?	A-Mei	3	89	11	103	201	Eliminated
2	Zhou Jieqiong	Have You Heard Lately?	A-Mei	3	81	14	98	201	Eliminated
3	Song Yuqi	Requiem For A Train of Life	Hedgehog	3	86	18	107	203	Pass
3	Vava	Requiem For A Train of Life	Hedgehog	4	70	22	96	203	Eliminated
4	Yamy	Mom Said	Xu Jiayun	4	85	25	114	232	Pass
4	Shan Yichun	Mom Said	Xu Jiayun	3	88	27	118	232	Pass
5	An Qi	Womxnly	Jolin Tsai	2	91	29	122	221	Pass
5	Lexie Liu	Womxnly	Jolin Tsai	4	70	25	99	221	Pass

=== Episode 6 (10 September 2021) ===
==== Mini Mission ====
For this mission, the Boom girls will have two hours to search for and record audio samples, which will be used as background audio for a short recorded story by the theme "A Departure". They will then be judged by a group of producers based on their imagination and influence.

The five highest-ranking girls had the benefit of choosing their theme for the next competition. The two remaining girls will have to work with two of the other girls. An Qi was chosen to work with Chen Zhuoxuan, while Song Yuqi was chosen to work with Lexie Liu. The selection of the theme also reveals the guests that will be collaborating with the girls. The guests are Second Hand Rose—"visual rock", Bibi Zhou—"lone wolf", IXFORM - Luo Yizhou—"national dance youth", THE9 - Snow Kong—"sexy, sweet and cool", and Cai Guoqing—"vintage modern".

Mini Mission（A Departure DEMO）
Rank	Name	Criteria	Producers							Total
Rank	Name	Criteria	Li You	Linlian Changhong	Xia Houzhe	Qu Shicong	Kong Xiaoyi	RJ	Bao Rui	Total
1	Lexie Liu	Imagination	4	5	0.5	5	4	5	5	57
1	Lexie Liu	Influence	5	5	4	5	3	3	3.5	57
2	Yamy	Imagination	5	1	2.5	4	4	3	4.5	55
2	Yamy	Influence	5	5	4	4	4	4	5	55
3	Shan Yichun	Imagination	4	5	2	5	3	3	4.5	51.5
3	Shan Yichun	Influence	4	4	4	3	3	3	4	51.5
4	Lu Keran	Imagination	5	4	2	3	3	4	4.5	49
4	Lu Keran	Influence	4	3	3	3	3	4	3.5	49
5	Chen Zhuoxuan	Imagination	3	3	1	3	4	2.5	4	48.5
5	Chen Zhuoxuan	Influence	4	5	4	3	4	4	4	48.5
6	An Qi	Imagination	3	3	1	3	3	3	3.5	44
6	An Qi	Influence	3	3	4	3	4	4	2.5	44
7	Song Yuqi	Imagination	2	2	1	4	3	2.5	4	39.5
7	Song Yuqi	Influence	3	3	4	4	3	1	3	39.5

=== Episode 7 (17 September 2021) ===
==== Third Competition (Guest Collaboration) Stage ====
This competition will be the second elimination round. The lowest-ranking group will be eliminated.

After the competition, the lowest-ranking group came out to be Lexie Liu and Song Yuqi's group. Therefore, they are both eliminated.

Third Competition Stage
Stage Order	Name	Guest	Song	Original Artist	Points	Results
1	Chen Zhuoxuan	IXFORM - Luo Yizhou	Free World	打扰一下 (EXCUSE ME)	89	Pass
1	An Qi	IXFORM - Luo Yizhou	Free World	打扰一下 (EXCUSE ME)	89	Pass
2	Yamy	Second Hand Rose	Dance Music	Second Hand Rose	67	Pass
3	Lu Keran	Cai Guoqing	Shut Up and Dance	Chris Lee	67	Pass
4	Lexie Liu	THE9 - Snow Kong	Cheongsam	《Call Me By My Name》 THE9 - Snow Kong 《佳人》Lexie Liu	66	Eliminated
4	Song Yuqi	THE9 - Snow Kong	Cheongsam	《Call Me By My Name》 THE9 - Snow Kong 《佳人》Lexie Liu	66	Eliminated
5	Shan Yichun	Bibi Zhou	Get Away	Bibi Zhou	79	Pass

=== Episode 8 (24 September 2021) ===
==== Character Mission ====
The next competition will include a musical show by the theme "Main Character", which the girls will collaborate.

For the musical show, each girl is to choose a given role. The roles available are Xiao Mai—a martial arts coach, Mi Guoguo—an amusement park clown, Ling Kongjing— a pilot, Liao Xiaobei—a paralegal, Shang Ya—an IT maniac, and Li Man—a fashion editor-in-chief. To determine who will have the main role in the musical, they will have to perform the song demo of their corresponding roles. They will then be judged by a group of producers based on their completion and performance. The girl with the highest score will have the main role. If a role is picked by multiple girls, the girl with the highest score will keep the role, while the other girl(s) will have to pick another role.

An Qi, having gotten the highest score, got the main role for the musical. Chen Zhuoxuan and Lu Keran both picked the role of Liao Xiaobei. Since Chen Zhuoxuan received a higher score, Lu Keran had to choose another role.

Character Mission
Stage Order	Name	Role	Completion	Performance	Total
1	An Qi	Mi Guoguo	55	56	111
2	Lu Keran	Liao Xiaobei	34	31	65
3	Chen Zhuoxuan	Liao Xiaobei	42	40.5	82.5
4	Shan Yichun	Li Man	44	35	79
5	Yamy	Xiao Mai	39	38	77

==== Fourth Competition Stage ====
This competition will be the third elimination round. The two lowest-ranking girls will be eliminated.

This competition is divided into two segments. The first segment is a musical show by the theme "Main Character", which the girls will collaborate. After the performance, the on-site voters will be able to vote a single girl who they think performed the best. The second segment is a solo show. The individual scores of each round will be totaled up to give the final results for the girls.

Fourth Competition Stage - Musical Show
Rank	Name	Role	Boom Babies Votes	Professional Votes	Total votes
1	An Qi	Mi Guoguo	13	11	24
2	Lu Keran	Shang Ya	4	15	19
3	Shan Yichun	Li Man	9	9	18
4	Yamy	Xiao Mai	10	5	15
5	Chen Zhuoxuan	Liao Xiaobei	4	4	8

=== Episode 9 (1 October 2021) ===
==== Fourth Competition Stage ====
For the solo show, it is revealed that a mystery guest will also perform on stage. One girl will be able to battle with the mystery guest. If the girl wins, she will automatically advance into the finals. However, if she loses, she will be eliminated. As every girl decided to battle the mystery guest, it became up to the mystery guest to choose her opponent. The mystery guest is revealed to be Meng Jia, who decided to battle Yamy.

After the competition, it is revealed that Yamy has lost to Meng Jia. Thus, she is eliminated. Chen Zhuoxuan and Lu Keran both tied for the last place. Thus, another round of voting was conducted by the mentors to reevaluate their performance. In the end, Lu Keran received a lower score, and therefore was eliminated.

Fourth Competition Stage - Solo Show
Stage Order	Name	Song	Original Artist	Mentor Votes	Boom Babies Votes	Professional Votes	Total votes
1	Meng Jia	Drip	Meng Jia	33	35	46	114
2	Yamy	We'll Meet Finally · Utopia	Yamy	36	28	26	90
3	Chen Zhuoxuan	My Words And Sentences Are All About You	高睿	37	27	21	85
4	Shan Yichun	Unworthy	Dreamz FM	31	35	24	90
5	Lu Keran	Roof On Fire	Victoria Song	30	26	18	74
6	An Qi	Run! Frantic Flowers	Waa Wei	36	40	34	110

Fourth Competition Stage
Rank	Name	Musical Show Score	Solo Show Score	Total Score	Reevaluation Score	Results
1	An Qi	24	110	134	NIL	Pass
2	Shan Yichun	18	90	108	NIL	Pass
3	Yamy	15	90	105	NIL	Eliminated
4	Chen Zhuoxuan	8	85	93	35	Pass
4	Lu Keran	19	74	93	26	Eliminated

=== Episode 10 (8 October 2021) ===
==== Fifth Competition Stage ====
This competition will be the last before the finals. Three previously eliminated girls will be resurrected for a chance to enter the finals. The resurrected girls are Vava, Lexie Liu and Song Yuqi.

This competition is divided into 3 segments. The first segment is known as the Qualifying Race. This segment will be a competition between the three girls who won the previous competition. The two highest-ranking girls will advance to the finals, while the remaining girl will move on to the last segment.

Shan Yichun received the lowest score. Therefore, she will move on to the last segment, while An Qi and Chen Zhuoxuan will advance to the finals.

Fifth Competition Stage - Qualifying Race
Stage Order	Name	Song	Original Artist	Professional Votes	Mentor Votes	Total votes	Results
1	An Qi	Magical	Stefanie Sun	33	31	64	Pass
2	Shan Yichun	Wei	Shan Yichun	25	34	59	Pending
3	Chen Zhuoxuan	Fly Away	F.I.R.	33	36	69	Pass

The second segment is known as the Breakout Round. This segment will be a competition between the three returning girls. The highest-ranking girl will move on to the last segment, while the two remaining girls will be eliminated.

Lexie Liu received the highest score. Therefore, she will compete with Shan Yichun in the last segment, while Vava and Song Yuqi are eliminated.

Fifth Competition Stage - Breakout Round
Stage Order	Name	Song	Original Artist	Professional Votes	Mentor Votes	Total votes	Results
1	Vava	IF	Vava	30	33	63	Eliminated
2	Lexie Liu	ALGTR	Lexie Liu	33	36	69	Pending
3	Song Yuqi	Big Up	Shang Wenjie	26	39	65	Eliminated

The last segment is known as the Same Song Ultimate Battle. For this segment, the lowest-ranking girl in the Qualifying Race and the highest-ranking girl in the Breakout Round will both perform the song "Wolves" separately. The winner will advance to the finals, while the loser will be eliminated.

Lexie Liu received a higher score. Therefore, she will advance to the finals, while Shan Yichun is eliminated.

Fifth Competition Stage - Same Song Ultimate Battle
Stage Order	Name	Professional Votes	Mentor Votes				Total Votes	Results
Stage Order	Name	Professional Votes	Qu Shicong	Jin Wugang	Kong Xiaoyi	Han Hong	Total Votes	Results
1	Lexie Liu	30	7	8	7	6	58	Pass
2	Shan Yichun	12	3	2	3	4	24	Eliminated

=== Episode 11 (15 October 2021) ===
After the 3 remaining Boom girls are finished with their rehearsal for the finals, they are reunited with the rest of the girls that have been eliminated (exclu. Betty Wu, Shan Yichun).

It is also announced that the Boom girls will all be performing "VVS" together for the opening stage of the finals.

== Discography ==
=== Single ===
Title	Peak chart position	Album Details
Title	CHN	Album Details
VVS	68	Released: August 12, 2021; Language: Mandarin; Track listing: 1. VVS; 2. VVS (Instrumental)
