= Tian tang =

Tian tang is a name for tong sui, a Cantonese dessert soup. It may also refer to:

- Tian Tang, Chinese-Canadian mechanical engineer
- Tang Tian (disambiguation), multiple people
