= Tang Tian =

Tang Tian may refer to:

- Tang Tian (footballer), (born 1977) Chinese footballer and coach
- Tang Tian (songwriter), (born 1983) Chinese songwriter
- Tian Tang, Chinese-Canadian mechanical engineer
