= Pamela M. Norris =

American mechanical engineer and materials scientist

Pamela Marie Norris is an American mechanical engineer and materials scientist known for her research on aerogels, and heat transfer on scales ranging from the nanoscale to macroscopic objects such as jet blast deflectors. She is Frederick Tracy Morse Professor Emeritus at the University of Virginia, vice provost for research at George Washington University, and editor-in-chief of the journal Nanoscale and Microscale Thermophysical Engineering.

== Education and career ==
Norris graduated from Old Dominion University in 1987, with a bachelor's degree in mechanical engineering and mechanics. She went to the Georgia Institute of Technology for graduate study in mechanical engineering, earning a master's degree in 1989 and completing her Ph.D. in 1992.

After postdoctoral research at the University of California, Berkeley, working there with Chang-Lin Tien, she joined the University of Virginia faculty in 1994. There, she founded the Nanoscale Energy Transfer Lab and Aerogel Research Lab, and became executive dean of the University of Virginia School of Engineering and Applied Science.

In 2021, she became editor-in-chief of the journal Nanoscale and Microscale Thermophysical Engineering, and retired from the University of Virginia to become vice provost for research at George Washington University.

== Recognition ==
Norris was named a Fellow of the American Society of Mechanical Engineers (ASME) in 2005, and an honorary member of the society in 2021, "for international leadership in nano, micro and macroscale thermal science and engineering research; for tireless efforts to advance diversity in STEM fields; and for demonstrating engineering excellence as an outstanding mentor for students and faculty".

The Society of Women Engineers named her as a Distinguished Engineering Educator in 2016.
