= Vava (rapper) =

Chinese rapper and singer

Mao Yanqi
- 毛衍七
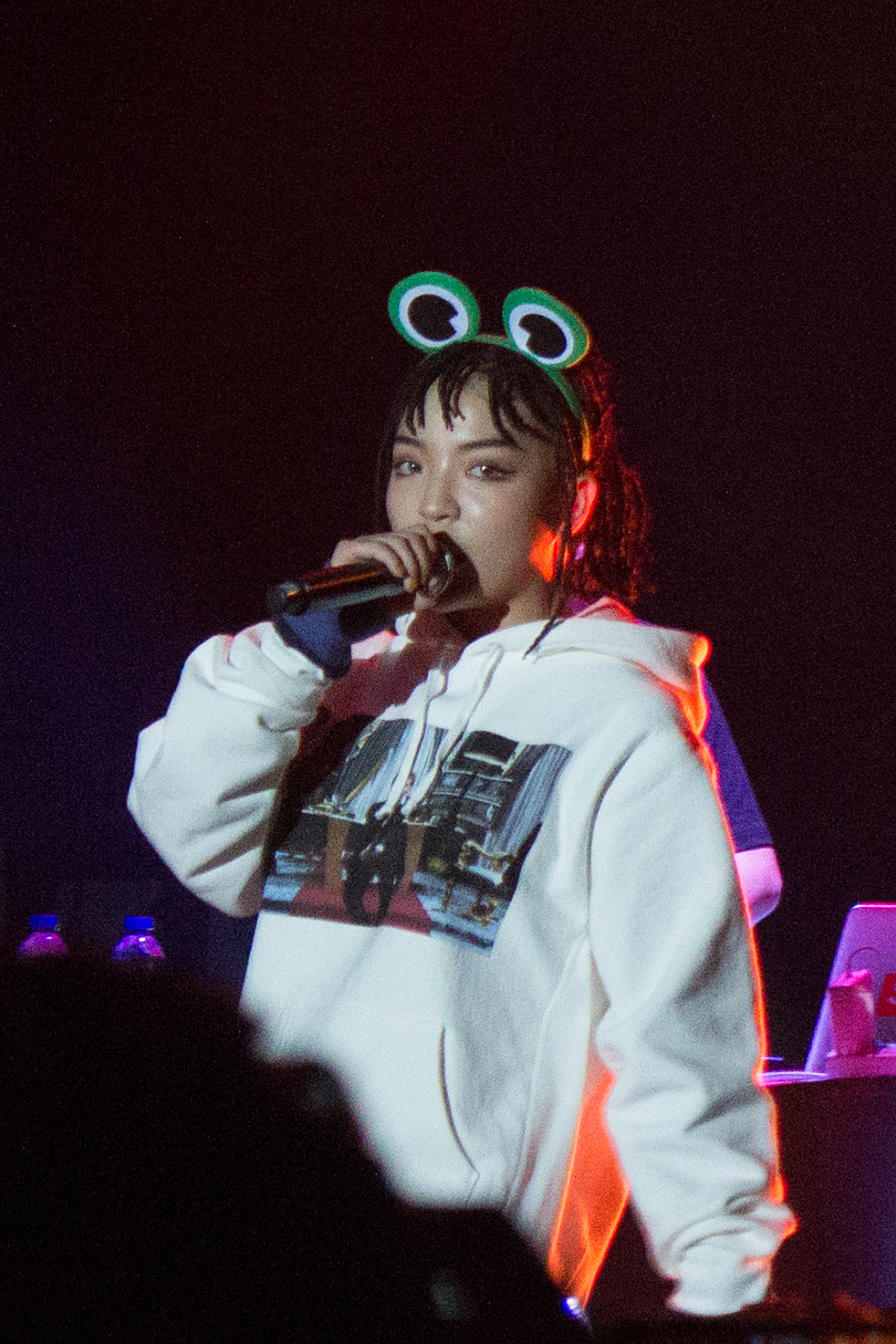
- Mao at a performance in 2019
- Born: 29 October 1995 (age 30); Ya'an, Sichuan, China
- Occupations: Rapper, singer
- Years active: 2014–present
- Musical career
- Labels: 种梦音乐 D.M.G.(Dream Music Group) & Warner Music China

Mao Yanqi (Chinese: 毛衍七; born 29 October 1995), professionally known as Vava, is a Chinese rapper and singer from Ya'an, Sichuan. Her English stage name Vava is a synonym for "doll" in Chinese (Chinese: 娃娃; pinyin: Wawa), chosen as she had a "baby face" when she was little.

== Childhood and early career ==
Mao Yanqi was raised in a single parent household after the death of her father. While her mother worked far away from home, her grandmother helped to care for her. At the age of 16 she chose to leave school and focus on developing her talents as a performer. She traveled around performing in local bars near her home in Chengdu. Later, she began to travel around China performing. She met hip-hop producer Double G in Shenzhen city, and joined his team based in Shanghai.

== Rise to fame ==
Vava rose to fame from her performance on the first season of the iQiyi television show The Rap of China. This show helped to bring underground rappers into the spotlight. During the season she rapped in both Mandarin and Sichuan dialects. In the second round, she performed “Life’s a Struggle” but changed the lyrics to match her own childhood experiences. She was the only female to reach the top four.

She released her first album “21” on 6 October 2017. One song from the album, "My New Swag" (我的新衣) was featured in the 2018 film Crazy Rich Asians. Vava was also featured in "New World" by Krewella. She had a modeling contract with American designer Alexander Wang and the sportswear brand Kappa.

In 2018, the Chinese government blocked hip-hop culture and actors with tattoos from appearing on television. As a result, VaVa was removed from a television show named Happy Camp. She said being off TV gave her time to focus on making music.

Her second album, "毛衍七", was released on 6 November 2019. VaVa signed with Warner Music China in August 2019. She was signed to 种梦音乐 D.M.G., which is also known as Dream Music Group, in 2021 and she and GAI became the mentor of The New Generation Project Of Hip-Hop. In 2021, she caused controversy by dressing as Nicki Minaj and wearing blackface on the 白变大咖秀 television show. She became a member of The Father Of Success of The Rap Of China 2022.

She released V-Mystery in 2022.

== Artistry and influences ==
While Vava was influenced by Rihanna and Little Simz, her biggest musical influence as a child was Jay Chou. VaVa is a strong advocate for incorporating more Chinese influences in Chinese hip-hop and rap. In her popular song “My New Swag” she used several traditional Chinese instruments: pipa (琵琶), erhu (二胡), suona (唢呐), guban (鼓板), and pitched cymbals xiaoluo (小锣) and daluo (大锣). She also incorporated an aria from the Peking opera, Selling Water (卖水), during the bridge, sung by opera singer Wang Qianqian.

== Politics ==
Along with other Mainland pop culture figures, VaVa has publicly taken a pro-Mainland government stance regarding Hong Kong, stating on her social media pages that she feels that Hong Kong will always be a part of China. After the Fu Guohao incident, in which Hong Kong protestors tied up and beat a mainland-based Global Times journalist, VaVa shared on social media Fu's quote, "I support the Hong Kong police; you can beat me now" which became a viral expression of pro-establishment support.

== Discography ==
=== 21 (2017) ===
No.	Title	Translated title	Length
1.	"U Should Know My Name (Intro)"	U Should Know My Name (Intro)	1:14
2.	"Ego (feat. Blow Fever & Lexie)"	Ego (feat. Blow Fever & Lexie)	3:16
3.	"我的新衣 (feat. Ty. & 王倩倩)"	My New Swag (feat. Ty. & Nina Wang)	4:05
4.	"網紅"	Internet Celebrity	3:52
5.	"Get It On The Floor"	Get It On The Floor	3:08
6.	"Happy Everyday"	Happy Everyday	3:16
7.	"Life's a Struggle"	Life's a Struggle	3:50
8.	"讓 (feat. Evis Wy)"	U Make Me (feat. Evis Wy)	3:33
9.	"Rap Star"	Rap Star	3:58
10.	"Back In My Zone"	Back In My Zone	3:29
11.	"On My Way (Outro)"	On My Way (Outro)	1:26
Total length:			35:05

=== 21 Part II (2018) ===
No.	Title	Translated title	Length
1.	"找朋友"	Find Friends	3:04
2.	"One (feat. Lexie Liu)"	One (feat. Lexie Liu)	3:08
3.	"Jump out of the window (feat. Evis Wy)"	Jump out of the window (feat. Evis Wy)	3:19
4.	"说唱大帝 (feat. Kozay)"	Rap Emperor	3:31
5.	"玻尿酸"	Hyaluronic	4:00
Total length:			17:03

=== 毛衍七 (2019) ===
No.	Title	Translated title	Length
1.	"Intro"		1:23
2.	"D.I.W.D"		3:19
3.	"Rainbow"		3:17
4.	"所以说 (feat. 李大奔 & 王子)"	So...? (feat. Benzo & Zi)	3:36
5.	"Friends"		3:58
6.	"Lie"		3:05
7.	"Higher Than You"		3:10
8.	"梦中情人 (feat. 满舒克)"	Dream Lover (feat. Young Jack)	3:48
9.	"QUEEN IS BACK"		2:58
10.	"4"		3:25
Total length:			31:59

=== Vow (2020) ===
No.	Title	Length
1.	"23:40 (Can't Commit)"	2:52
2.	"Never Mind"	1:43
3.	"The Weekend"	2:46
4.	"Paper Passion"	2:25
5.	"Man in a Ghost Town"	2:47
Total length:		12:35

=== V-Dynasty, Pt. 1 (2020) ===
No.	Title	Translated title	Length
1.	"Face 2 Face"		2:07
2.	"安逸"	Eazy Life	3:48
3.	"Let's Go (feat. 周延)"	Let's Go (feat. GAI)	2:53
4.	"咋個嘞喃"	Wussup Wit That	2:57
5.	"Calm Down"		2:33
Total length:			14:18
