= Rap for Youth =

- 说唱新世代
- Genre: Reality competition
- Judges: Huang Zitao; MC HotDog; Higher Brothers; Rich Brian; Li Yuchun
- Country of origin: China
- Original language: Chinese
- No. of seasons: 1
- No. of episodes: 11

Original release
- Network: Bilibili
- Release: August 22 – November 1, 2020

Rap for Youth (说唱新世代) is a Chinese rap streaming competition television series that airs on the digital and streaming service Bilibili. The show features regular judges Huang Zitao, MC HotDog, Higher Brothers and Indonesian rapper Rich Brian, and special guest judge Li Yuchun. The show, which began airing in the summer of 2020, puts it in direct competition with other major Chinese rap competition shows such as The Rap of China, which airs on iQIYI, and Rap Star, which airs on Mango TV.

Rap for Youth was acclaimed by critics and audiences, and received a 9.2 out of 10 rating on Douban, which is among the highest ever ratings for any music programs on Douban.

The first season of Rap for Youth began airing on August 22, 2020, and concluded on November 1, 2020. It has accumulated 550 million streaming views on Bilibili. The top 8 contestants, including Ingrita Yu Zhen (于贞), Subs Zhang Yichen (张毅成), Sha Yiting EL (沙一汀EL), Sundae (圣代), Landuo (懒惰), Chen Jinnan (陈近南), MCSWEET (斯威特), and Straight Fire Gang Feezy (直火帮Feezy), along with additional contestants Adawa (阿达娃) and AK Liu Zhang (AK刘彰), joined the rap music label "W8VES," which was created by Bilibili and 88rising.

== See also ==
- The Rap of China, rap competition show on iQIYI
- Rap Star, rap competition show on Mango TV
