= University of Virginia School of Engineering and Applied Science =

School of Engineering and Applied Science
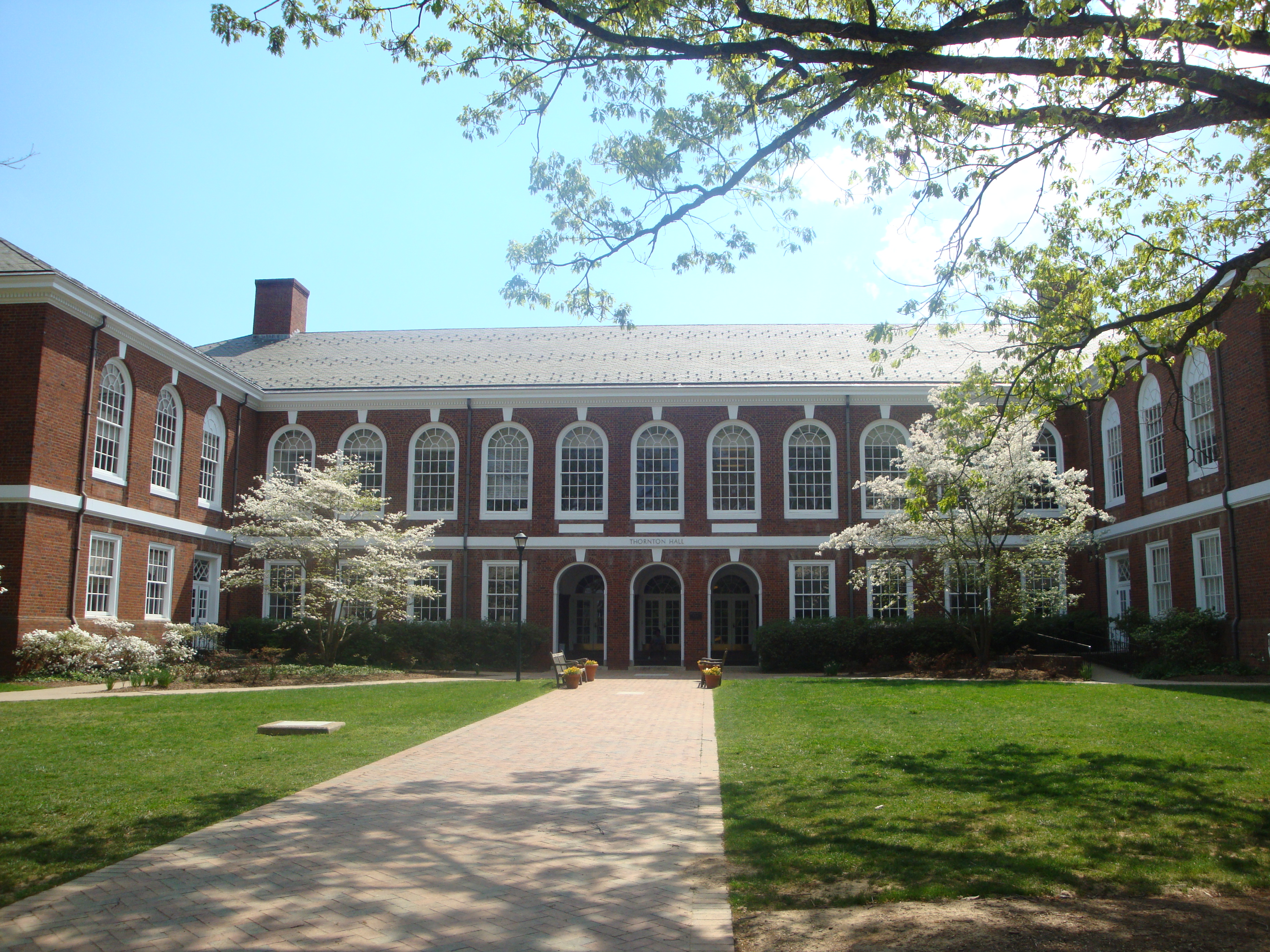
- Thornton Hall, the long-time home of the SEAS
- Type: Public Engineering school
- Established: 1836; 190 years ago
- Affiliations: University of Virginia
- Dean: Jennifer L. West
- Location: Charlottesville, Virginia, U.S.
- Website: engineering.virginia.edu

The University of Virginia School of Engineering and Applied Science is the undergraduate and graduate engineering school of the University of Virginia. Established in 1836, the School is the oldest university-affiliated engineering school in United States, and oldest engineering school in the Southern United States.

One of 12 schools and colleges at the University of Virginia, the School offers eleven undergraduate majors along with graduate programs for each of its nine departments.

== History ==
In 1836, the Board of Visitors made civil engineering a formal course of study at the University of Virginia. Initially named the School of Civil Engineering, it was first led by Charles Bonnycastle and William Barton Rogers, who would later go on to become the founding president of MIT in 1864. At the time, only three institutions of higher learning in the U.S. were wholly devoted to engineering instruction, and with its 1836 resolution, the University of Virginia became the first enduring engineering program established in the South and the first in the nation at a comprehensive university.

Under Dean Thornton (1905-1925), mechanical, electrical, and chemical engineering became new programs of the School.

Under Dean Lawrence R. Quarles (1955-1973), the School added graduate degree programs in biomedical engineering, nuclear engineering, materials science, applied mathematics and systems engineering. Programs in studies of policy and information management were added by Quarles' successor, John E. Gibson (1973-1983).

In 1998, the School ended its nuclear engineering program.

In 2012, the Engineering School established the Department of Engineering and Society (E&S). Along with providing many of the foundational courses in the School's curriculum, E&S is responsible for the following programs for undergraduates: the undergraduate thesis, the Washington, D.C. Science and Technology Policy Internship, Rodman Scholars, international studies, online courses, and hands-on activities such as the electric vehicle project.

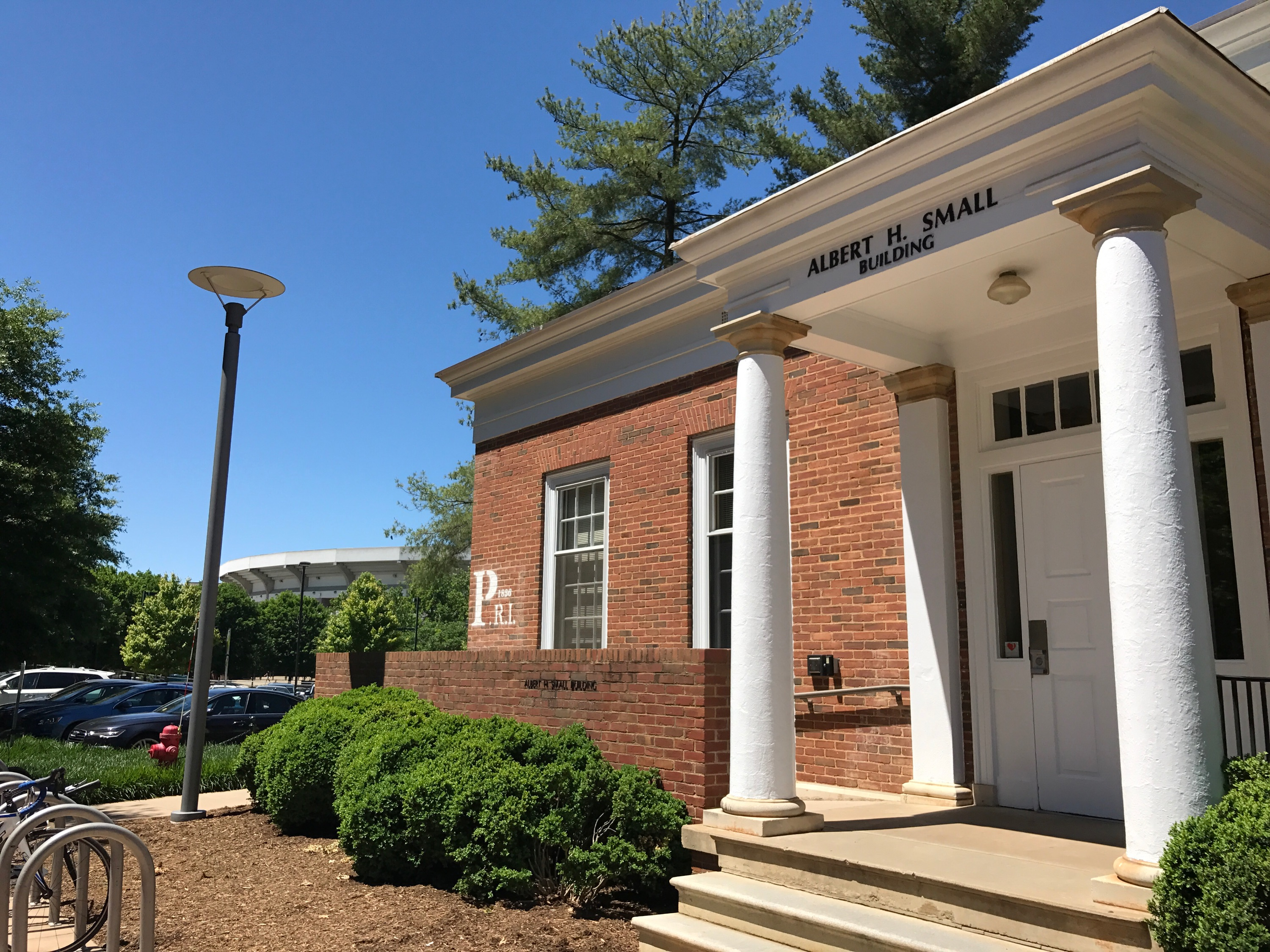
Markings along Engineer's Way

Starting in 2015, a team led by mechanical engineering professor Eric Loth began research into a UVA design of offshore wind turbines that would potentially dwarf the size and scope of any being produced or researched anywhere else. The innovative design inspired by palm trees led to Roth being named to a Popular Science list of “The Brilliant Minds Behind The New Energy Revolution” in June of that year.

In 2018 and 2019, teams consisting of computer science undergraduates twice won the Alamo Cup and repeat national championships at the National Collegiate Cyber Defense Competition. This is the best known collegiate information security competition in the United States, and the University of Virginia won the 2019 competition over 235 competing universities.

== Academics ==
The School enrolls approximately 4,000 undergraduate students and 1,200 graduate students.

=== Clark Scholars Program ===
The A. James Clark Scholars Program was established in 2018 as the result of a $15 million gift from the A. James and Alice B. Clark Foundation in 2017. Clark Scholars are selected from underserved demographics for their academic excellence, track record of leadership, and commitment to community service. The inaugural cohort of 16, led in the 2018-2019 school year by Stephanie Gernentz, Joshua Arul, and Rachel Zhang, entered in June 2018.

=== Rodman Scholars Program ===
The Rodman Scholars Program, founded in 1979, consists of the top 5 percent of each class of engineering students. Qualifying students are automatically selected as Rodman Scholars. First-year students may also apply to join the program as Midyear Scholars. Rodman Scholars are enrolled in an exclusive first-year engineering course and have access to student-led seminars not available to other students.

=== Departments ===
There are nine departments part of the School of Engineering:

- Biomedical engineering
- Chemical engineering
- Civil and Environmental engineering
- Computer science
- Electrical and Computer engineering
- Engineering and Society
- Materials science and Engineering
- Mechanical and Aerospace engineering
- Systems and Information engineering

These departments are home to eleven degree programs:

- Aerospace Engineering
- Biomedical Engineering
- Chemical Engineering
- Civil Engineering
- Computer Engineering
- Computer Science
- Electrical Engineering
- Engineering Science
- Materials Science and Engineering
- Mechanical Engineering
- Systems Engineering

There are also fourteen available minors provided by the School. The above programs, except for aerospace engineering, computer engineering, engineering science, and mechanical engineering, all have a corresponding minor. In addition to them are:

- Applied mathematics
- Engineering Business
- History of Science and Technology
- Science and Technology Policy
- Science, Technology, and Society
- Technology Ethics
- Technology and the Environment

=== Research ===
Founded in 2009 and first issue published in April 2010, The Spectra: The Virginia Engineering and Science Research Journal, is a peer reviewed undergraduate research journal published by the UVA. School of Engineering and Applied Sciences.

=== Other Programs ===
The School offers options aside from the typical programs, including the Accelerated master's degree in Systems Engineering, Cardinal Education, and the MBA/ME Program.

== The Society of P.R.I. ==
One of the many secret societies at U.Va., The Society of P.R.I. is exclusive to the engineering community. It is known for honoring faculty, staff, and students for exceptional service to their respective communities.

== Centers and Institutes ==
Listed are the Centers and Institutes associated with the School of Engineering and Applied Science:

- Center for Advanced Biomanufacturing
- Center for Applied Biomechanics
- Center for Automata Processing
- Center for Electrochemical Science and Engineering
- Center for Research in Intelligent Storage and Processing in Memory
- Center for Risk Management of Engineering Systems
- Center for Transportation Studies
- Center for Visual and Decision Informatics
- Commonwealth Center for Advanced Logistics Systems (CCALS)
- Commonwealth Center for Advanced Manufacturing (CCAM)
- Coulter Center for Translational Research
- Environmental Resilience Institute
- Global Infectious Diseases Institute
- nanoSTAR Institute
- NSF I/UCRC Center for Laser & Plasma For Advanced Manufacturing (LAM)
- Mid-Atlantic Transportation Sustainability University Transportation Center (MATS UTC)
- Multi-Functional Integrated System Technology (MIST) Center
- NSF Nanosystems Engineering Research Center for Advanced Self-Powered Systems of Integrated Sensors and Technologies (ASSIST)
- Rolls-Royce University Technology Center
- Virginia Center for Grid Research
- UVA Center for Wireless Health
