= Rap Star (TV series) =

- 说唱听我的
- Genre: Reality competition
- Judges: Wang Linkai (Xiao Gui); Tia Ray; Danko; Yang Changqing; Air; Mc Guang Guang; Fa Lao; Pact
- Narrated by: Du Haitao
- Country of origin: China
- Original language: Chinese
- No. of seasons: 2
- No. of episodes: 13

Original release
- Network: Mango TV
- Release: June 7, 2020 – present

Rap Star (simplified Chinese: 说唱听我的; traditional Chinese: 說唱聽我的) is a Chinese rap competition television series that airs on the streaming service platform Mango TV. The show, which is hosted by Du Haitao, features judges including Wang Linkai (Xiao Gui), Tia Ray, Danko, Yang Changqing, Air, Mc Guang Guang, Fa Lao, and Pact. The show is the second major Chinese rap competition show after The Rap of China, which airs on iQIYI since 2017.

The first season of Rap Star began airing on June 7, 2020 and concluded on August 30, 2020.

The second season of Rap Star began airing on July 18, 2021.

== See also ==
- The Rap of China, rap competition show on iQIYI
- Rap for Youth, rap competition show on Bilibili
