= Hailai Ahmu =

Chinese singer (born 1993)

- 海来阿木
- Born: 4 April 1993 (age 33); Ganluo County, Sichuan, China
- Education: Middle school
- Occupation: Singer
- Years active: 2018–present
- Spouse: Chen Lin (m. 2014)

Chinese name
- Simplified Chinese: 海来阿木
- Traditional Chinese: 海來阿木
Transcriptions
Standard Mandarin
- Hanyu Pinyin: Hǎilái Āhmù

Hailai Ahmu (Yi: ꉌꆽꀈꃆꐙꁮ; Chinese: 海来阿木; born 4 April 1993) is a Chinese singer of Yi ethnicity.

== Biography ==
Hailai Ahmu was born in Ganluo County, Sichuan, on 4 April 1993. He has two younger sisters and two younger brothers. After graduating from middle school, he dropped out. At the age of 18, he went to Chengdu alone, rented a basement, worked part-time at a snack shop during the day, and worked as a resident singer at a bar at night. Later, he became a truck driver in his home-county, and got married.

Hailai Ahmu first came to public attention in 2013, when he participated in the Oriental TV talent show Season 1 of Chinese Idol competition.

In 2020, his songs "The Person Who Demands Songs" and "Your Myriad of Rivers and thousands of Hills" became popular on the internet, and he subsequently became active in various large-scale evening parties and music variety shows. In 2021, he embarked on his first national concert tour. In 2024, for the first time, he was invited to perform the song "Why Not Meet Up" with Shan Yichun at the CCTV Spring Festival Gala. In May 2024, he joined the Hunan Television's Singer 2024.

On April 23, 2025, he was supplementarily elected as a vice chairperson of the presidium of the Fifth Committee of the Chengdu City Federation of Literary and Art Circles.

In March 2026, the Sichuan Provincial Department of Human Resources and Social Security granted him the professional title of "Second-Class Actor" (an associate senior-level title), following expert panel review and a favorable determination by the Sichuan Provincial Evaluation Committee for Associate Senior Professional Titles in the Arts Series for New Literary and Art Groups.

== Personal life ==
In 2013, Hailai Ahmu divorced with his wife and his newborn daughter Agojiqu died prematurely due to congenital intestinal obstruction. In 2014, he met his second wife Chen Lin while forming the "Reverse Time" band in his hometown. Chen is a bassist.

== Discography ==
=== Songs ===
- Aguojiqu (阿果吉曲)
- Xilou Ernü (西楼儿女)
- "The Person Who Demands Songs" (点歌的人)
- "Your Myriad of Rivers and thousands of Hills" (你的万水千山)
- Three Lives and Three Lucks (三声三幸)
- Farewell to My Close Friend (别知己)
- After the 50-year Period (五十年以后)
- Life is like a Song (人生如歌)
- The Human World (烟雨人间)
- Come Dancing (来跳舞)
- "The Wind Passing By on The Way Home(过路的晚风)

== Variety shows ==
Year	English title	Chinese title	Notes
2013	Season 1 of Chinese Idol	中国梦之声	
2022	Season 3 of The Treasured Voice	天赐的声音	
2024	Singer 2024	歌手2024	
