= C-Block (Chinese group) =

Chinese hip-hop group

- Origin: Changsha, Hunan, China
- Genres: Hip-hop; rap
- Years active: 2007–present
- Member of: Sup Music
- Members: Damnshine; Kungfu-Pen; Key.L

C-Block is a Chinese hip-hop group from Changsha City (or CSC as it is also known), formed in 2007 and currently consisting of Damnshine (Yu Sheng), Kungfu-Pen (Yifan Shi) and Key.L (Cong Liu). They have been in the hip-hop music scene since their high school days and have experimented with songwriting. In their early years, they mainly wrote humorous and reflective songs in Changsha dialect, and became a popular group among local youths, with "Changsha Ce Changsha" being the most famous song among them. The group insisted to write, releasing classic albums such as "Spit Out" and "Power to the people". After gradually gaining national fame, they also made a name for themselves in Chinese showbiz after 2018 by taking part in talent shows including The Rap of China. With a unique "Flow of Jiang-hu" style, C-Block's music is independent and powerful. C-Block is a highly influential and iconic rap group, and is considered to be the longest-running hip-hop group in mainland China.
