= The Rap of China =

Chinese television series

- 中国新说唱
- Genre: Reality competition
- Judges: Kris Wu, Will Pan, Jane Zhang, GAI, MC HotDog, Chang Chen-yue, G.E.M., Jay Park, Keyng(Yang hesu), Tablo, Mc Pharaoh, Wowkie Da, Boss X(Xie Di), Fan Cheng Cheng
- Country of origin: China
- Original language: Chinese
- No. of seasons: 6
- No. of episodes: 65

Production
- Producers: Chen Wei, Che Che, Liu Zhou, Wang Tiantian, Yue Wang
- Production company: iQiyi

Original release
- Network: iQiyi
- Release: June 24, 2017 – present

The Rap of China (simplified Chinese: 中国新说唱; traditional Chinese: 中國新說唱; pinyin: Zhōngguó xīn shuōchàng), formerly known as (simplified Chinese: 中国有嘻哈; traditional Chinese: 中國有嘻哈; pinyin: Zhōngguó yǒu xīhā), is a Chinese rap competition show produced by iQiyi. The show was carried out in the form of three groups of producers Kris Wu, Will Pan, MC HotDog and Chang Chen-yue judging the performance of the participating students, and received great attention. In the end, after fierce competition among players and difficult choices of producers, China's hip-hop first season produced two annual championships, GAI (musician) and PG ONE.

On April 9, 2018, the official Weibo of "The Rap of China 2" (simplified Chinese: 中国新说唱; traditional Chinese: 中國新說唱; pinyin: Zhōngguó xīn shuōchàng) was launched. On May 17, the instructor of the second season confirmed that in addition to the original Kris Wu, Will Pan, MC HotDog and Chang Chen-yue in the first season, there would also be the newly added G.E.M., which was broadcast on July 14, 2018.

== Episodes ==
=== Series overview ===
Season	Episodes	Originally aired	
Season	Episodes	First aired	Last aired
Season 1	12	June 24, 2017	September 9, 2017
Season 2	13	July 14, 2018	October 6, 2018
Season 3	12	June 14, 2019	August 30, 2019
Season 4	12	August 14, 2020	October 30, 2020
All-Star Season 1	12	06/24 2022	09/11 2022
All-Star Season 2	12	05/06 2023	07/23 2023
Season 5	12	May 4, 2024	July 21, 2024

== Season 1 (2017) ==
The first episode of season one of The Rap of China aired on 24 June 2017. The producers were Canadian rapper Kris Wu, Taiwanese-American singer Will Pan, Taiwanese rapper MC HotDog and Taiwanese rock musician Chang Chen-yue. Notable rappers such as HipHopMan, Tizzy T, PG One, BrAnTB, Jony J, After Journey, VAVA, GAI, Bridge, Ty. and others participated in this season. The finals were competed between the top three contestants PG One, GAI and After Journey as well as Jony J, who was resurrected from his earlier elimination. PG One and GAI were announced joint winners after the final round of voting ended up in a draw.

=== Rounds ===
Round One (Open Auditions): Open auditions were held in Beijing. Rappers would rap without music and if the producers liked it, they would hand the rapper a chain that indicates that they move on to the next round.

Round Two (60 Second Rap): Contestants that passed would be given 60 seconds each to present their prepared rap to the producers. They only need one producer to pass for them to move on; however, if all the producers fail them, they would be eliminated.

Round Three (Team Cypher): Contestants draw a name from a hat to pick their temporary team. Each team takes a turn to freestyle to a beat on a topic that their producer chose. If they don’t get the microphone in the time permitted or their rap is deemed not good enough, they are chosen for elimination.

Round Four (1 vs 1 Battle): Based on their assessment in the previous round, the contestants chose an opponent to battle against. They choose a beat and create a song together that is performed. When they battle, producers vote on who was better and the loser is eliminated. The 20 contestants who were eliminated in the 1 vs 1 battles return and each producer team chooses one rapper to return.

Round Five (Team Selection): Each producer team performs in front of the contestants and an audience who votes for their favorite. From the votes, the judges earn chances to select rappers to form teams. The producers sit on one side of the doors and contestants enter from the opposite room. If both the producer and contestant stand at the door, the contestant makes it into that producer's team. If not, they will still have a chance at being chosen later on. Each team can have up to 5 members.

Round Six (Team Performance Part I): Each team has a short amount of time after selection to create a team song to a chosen beat. They perform in front of an audience that votes for the member that they think did the worst. That member is then eliminated.

Round Seven (Team Performance Part II): Once again, each team creates a team song; however, they perform for just the producers this time around. The producer of each team chooses a member to eliminate from their team.

Round Eight (Demon Challenge and Team Performance): A mainstream artist is invited on the show and assesses a member from each team. Both separately perform a prepared song. Representatives from media companies vote on their performances. If the contestant wins, they immediately advance to the top 6. The producers and their teams create a song together and perform it for the audience. The team with the most votes can save a member while the second team is up for elimination. The last team is forced to immediately eliminate one member.

Round Nine (Semi-finals Part I): The top 6 are drawn against one another to each perform a song. Renowned music producers then vote on which contestant was better in each battle. The 3 losing contestants battle against each other and 2 are eliminated.

Round Ten (Semi-finals Part II): The 4 contestants team up with a guest singer for a performance. The 2 rappers with the lowest votes compete against each other and one is eliminated.

Round Eleven (Finals): The remaining 3 rappers as well as one resurrected rapper perform to a live audience. Votes decides who moves on until there are only 2 rappers left. The final 2 contestants each perform a song and the winner is decided by a combination of votes from invited peers and the producers.

Notable Rappers
Rapper	Round 1	Round 2	Round 3	Round 4	Round 5	Round 6	Round 7	Round 8	Round 9	Round 10	Finale
PG One	PASS	PASS	PASS	PASS	PASS	PASS	PASS	PASS	PASS	PASS	CO-WINNER
GAI	PASS	PASS	PASS	PASS	PASS	PASS	PASS	PASS	PASS	PASS	CO-WINNER
After Journey	PASS	PASS	PASS	PASS	PASS	PASS	PASS	PASS	PASS	PASS	ELIMINATED
Jony J	PASS	PASS	PASS	ELIMINATED						REVIVED	ELIMINATED
VAVA	PASS	PASS	PASS	PASS	PASS	PASS	PASS	PASS	PASS	ELIMINATED	
Tizzy T	PASS	PASS	PASS	PASS	PASS	PASS	PASS	PASS	ELIMINATED		
Huang Xu (BooM)	PASS	PASS	PASS	PASS	PASS	PASS	PASS	PASS	ELIMINATED		
BrAnTB	PASS	PASS	PASS	PASS	PASS	PASS	PASS	ELIMINATED			
Bridge	PASS	PASS	PASS	PASS	PASS	PASS	PASS	ELIMINATED			
HipHopMan (MC Jin)	PASS	PASS	PASS	PASS	PASS	PASS	ELIMINATED				
Gui Bian (Splirit)	PASS	PASS	PASS	PASS	PASS	PASS	ELIMINATED				
OBi & M03 (OB03)	PASS	PASS	PASS	PASS	PASS	ELIMINATED					
Sun Bayi	PASS	PASS	PASS	PASS	PASS	ELIMINATED					
BCW	PASS	PASS	PASS	PASS	ELIMINATED						
Ty.	PASS	ELIMINATED									

Teams (Top 15)
Producer Team	Rapper
Team Kris Wu	PG One
Team Kris Wu	Tizzy T
Team Kris Wu	BrAntB
Team Kris Wu	HipHopMan
Team Kris Wu	OB03 (OBi & M03)
Team Will Pan	VAVA
Team Will Pan	Bridge
Team Will Pan	Li Daben (Benzo)
Team Will Pan	Gui Bian (Splirit)
Team Will Pan	Hu Xu (Hugh)
Team MC HotDog & Chang Chen-yue	GAI
Team MC HotDog & Chang Chen-yue	After Journey
Team MC HotDog & Chang Chen-yue	Huang Xu (BooM)
Team MC HotDog & Chang Chen-yue	Sena
Team MC HotDog & Chang Chen-yue	Sun Bayi

=== Annual Ranking ===
Annual Ranking
champion	runner up	Third place
GAI (musician), PG ONE	After Journey	Jony J

- GAI (musician) and PG ONE tied for the championship.
- Jony J entered the finals as a non-card and won the third runner-up in the year
- VAVA is the top four player of the year produced by the main game system, but unfortunately, she lost to Jony J in the wild card game.

=== Promotion ===
Members of The Rap of China appeared on Happy Camp on September 2, 2017.

== Season 2 (2018) ==
The first episode of season two of The Rap of China aired on 14 July 2018. The producers were Canadian rapper Kris Wu, Taiwanese-American singer Will Pan, Hong Kong singer G.E.M., Taiwanese rapper MC HotDog and Taiwanese rock musician Chang Chen-yue. Open auditions were held outside of mainland China for the first time in Los Angeles, Melbourne and Kuala Lumpur. Notable rappers such as Manshuke (Young Jack), Wang Yitai (3HO), KungFu-Pen, Lexie Liu, Vinida, Nick Chou, Li Jialong (JelloRio), Al Rocco, Nawukere (Lil-Em), ICE and others participated in this season. The finals were competed between the top three contestants Nawukere (Lil-Em), ICE and Lexie Liu as well as Aire (AIR), who was resurrected from his earlier elimination. Aire (AIR) defeated Nawukere (Lil-Em) in the final round of voting and was named champion.

Teams (Top 15)
Producer Team	Rapper
Team Kris Wu	Nawukere (Lil-Em)
Team Kris Wu	Wang Yitai (3HO)
Team Kris Wu	Blow Fever
Team Kris Wu	Al Rocco
Team Kris Wu	Manshuke (Young Jack)
Team Will Pan & G.E.M.	Aire (AIR)
Team Will Pan & G.E.M.	ICE
Team Will Pan & G.E.M.	Nick Chou
Team Will Pan & G.E.M.	Wang Qiming (WatchMe)
Team Will Pan & G.E.M.	Yang Hesu (KeyNG)
Team MC HotDog & Chang Chen-yue	Lexie Liu
Team MC HotDog & Chang Chen-yue	KungFu-Pen
Team MC HotDog & Chang Chen-yue	PACT
Team MC HotDog & Chang Chen-yue	Ma Jun (Max)
Team MC HotDog & Chang Chen-yue	Jason

== Season 3 (2019) ==
The first episode of season three of The Rap of China aired on 14 June 2019. The producers were Canadian rapper Kris Wu, Taiwanese-American singer Will Pan, Hong Kong singer G.E.M., Taiwanese rapper MC HotDog and Taiwanese rock musician Chang Chen-yue. Notable rappers such as Huang Xu (BooM), Damnshine, Liu Cong (Key.L), KungFu-Pen, L4WUDU, Yang Hesu (KeyNG), Xiao En'en (Sean T), NINEONE, OBi, SIO and others participated in this season. The finals were competed between the top three contestants Huang Xu (BooM), Damnshine and Xinxiu as well as Yang Hesu (KeyNG), who was resurrected from his earlier elimination. Yang Hesu (KeyNG) defeated Huang Xu (BooM) in the final round of voting by just a single vote and was named champion.

Teams (Top 20)
Producer Team	Rapper
Team Kris Wu	Damnshine
Team Kris Wu	L4WUDU
Team Kris Wu	Fukesi (FOX)
Team Kris Wu	DOOOBOI
Team Kris Wu	Li Kui
Team Will Pan	Yang Hesu (KeyNG)
Team Will Pan	Huang Xu (BooM)
Team Will Pan	Xiao En'en (Sean T)
Team Will Pan	TURBO
Team Will Pan	OBi
Team MC HotDog & Chang Chen-yue	Xinxiu
Team MC HotDog & Chang Chen-yue	Capper
Team MC HotDog & Chang Chen-yue	Cream D
Team MC HotDog & Chang Chen-yue	Miko
Team MC HotDog & Chang Chen-yue	SIO
Team G.E.M.	Liu Cong (Key.L)
Team G.E.M.	Liu Xuanting (LastKingLX)
Team G.E.M.	Vex
Team G.E.M.	Wang Dazhi (BigTattoo)
Team G.E.M.	Lil Boo

== Season 4 (2020) ==
The first episode of season four of The Rap of China aired on 14 August 2020. The label supervisors were Canadian rapper Kris Wu, Taiwanese-American singer Will Pan, Chinese singer Jane Zhang and Chinese rapper GAI. American rapper Jay Park participated in the season as a guest judge. Notable rappers such Li Jialong (JelloRio), BrAnTB, Li Daben (Benzo), AnsrJ, Lil Shin, Wang Qiming (WatchMe), Vinida, GALI, Xiaoqinglong (Dragon), Kafe. Hu and others participated in this season. The finals were competed between the top four contestants Li Jialong (JelloRio), Wang Qiming (WatchMe), GALI and KAFE. HU as well as Li Daben (Benzo), who was resurrected from his earlier elimination. Li Jialong (JelloRio) defeated Wang Qiming (WatchMe) in the final round of voting and was named champion.

Labels (Top 22)
Producer Team	Rapper
Kris Wu Label	Li Jialong (JelloRio)
Kris Wu Label	BrAnTB
Kris Wu Label	Mac Ova Seas
Kris Wu Label	Ugly Z
Kris Wu Label	REGI
Will Pan Label	Li Daben (Benzo)
Will Pan Label	KAFE.HU
Will Pan Label	AnsrJ
Will Pan Label	Meng Xu (MX)
Will Pan Label	Pan Pan (YoungPaine)
Jane Zhang Label	GALI
Jane Zhang Label	Vinida
Jane Zhang Label	Chen Sijian (ODD)
Jane Zhang Label	Liang Weijia (Saber)
Jane Zhang Label	Shashou Hao (KilleR)
Jane Zhang Label	IceProud
GAI Label	Wang Qiming (WatchMe)
GAI Label	Wei'er (Will.T)
GAI Label	Liang Laoshi (Tsong)
GAI Label	Xiaoqinglong (Dragon)
GAI Label	VOB & Double C
GAI Label	CJ

== All-Star Season 1 (2022) ==
This season brought many famous rappers from the show and overall back. Many Where eliminated until the quarter finals where 4 teams battled it out to see who was champion. Some Notable Rappers who participated are Gai, bridge, Kungfu Pen, Keyng (Yang Hesu), Zhao An, Aire(Air), Wang Yitai (3HO), MC HotDog, Capper, Tizzy T, Gali, Liu Xuanting (LastKingLX), Damnshine (Sheng Yu), Liu Cong (Key.L), VaVa, Vinida, Gem (Lao Jiu), PACT, NineOne, ICE, Li JiaLong (JelloRio), Psy.P, Zhan Yian Qing, Huang Xu (BooM), L4WuDu, JinxZhou.

== All-Star Season 2 (2023) ==
Similar Format to 2022 All star Season but with even more rappers this time.

== Season 7 (2024) ==
The Judges this season where KeyNG (Yang He Su) and Tablo, MC HotDog and Chang Chen-Yue, Boss X (Xie Di) and Fan Cheng Cheng, MC Pharaoh and Wowkie Da. The MC this season was NineOne. Notable contestants included duo C2C from NOUS UNDERGROUND along with Free Out members Ice Paper and Round 2's Er Wan. The finals were competed between the top four contestants JinJibewater (Sun), Xin Xiu, AThree, and Hui Zi. Ultimately, JinJibewater was crowned champion, with Xin Xiu as the runner-up and AThree third.

Labels (Top 22)
Producer Team	Rapper
Keyng and Tablo Label	JinJiBeWater (Sun)
Keyng and Tablo Label	Shark
Keyng and Tablo Label	Jessie
Keyng and Tablo Label	Lil Wine
Keyng and Tablo Label	Oliver Jiang
Keyng and Tablo Label	Ice Paper
Mc HotDog and Chang Chen-YueLabel	Xin Xiu
Mc HotDog and Chang Chen-YueLabel	Hui Zi
Mc HotDog and Chang Chen-YueLabel	Fu Lai
Mc HotDog and Chang Chen-YueLabel	Berry Chan
Mc HotDog and Chang Chen-YueLabel	Mc Zang Zang
Mc HotDog and Chang Chen-YueLabel	Wu lian nan hu lu
Boss X (Xie Di) and Fan Cheng Cheng	Athree
Boss X (Xie Di) and Fan Cheng Cheng	Roll Flash (Luo Yian)
Boss X (Xie Di) and Fan Cheng Cheng	Kito
Boss X (Xie Di) and Fan Cheng Cheng	Er Wan
Boss X (Xie Di) and Fan Cheng Cheng	Nxmad(Luo Man De)
Boss X (Xie Di) and Fan Cheng Cheng	JarStick
Mc Pharaoh and Wowkie Da Label	AA
Mc Pharaoh and Wowkie Da Label	Zhao San
Mc Pharaoh and Wowkie Da Label	C2C (KIlla4nia and Kigga)
Mc Pharaoh and Wowkie Da Label	A La Mei
Mc Pharaoh and Wowkie Da Label	Danny K
Mc Pharaoh and Wowkie Da Label	Xuan Ke Xiong Die

== Season 8 (2025) ==
Judges this season were Huang Zi Tao, Vinida Weng and Yan Hao Xiang of TNT, TizzyT and Capper. Notable participants included CreamD from NOUS UNDERGROUND. Ultimately, Shark was crowned champion, with DDG (Deng Dian Guo) as the runner-up, Top Barry in third, and Rapeter in fourth. Notably, Shark and Rapeter were both participants of the last season.

== All-Star Season 3 (2026) ==
As the 10th year anniversary since Rap of China Season 1 aired in 2017, this season brought many accomplished rappers back to compete for a top 5 seat in the "Hall of Fame". This season aired from June 27, 2026 to September 12, 2026, with the MC for this season being Du Haitao, and judges Yan Hao Xiang of TNT and Boss X (Xie Di). The lineup for this season included Bridge, VAVA, Huang Xu (BooM), BrAnTB, Li Daben (BENZO), Aire (AIR), KungFu-Pen, ICE, PACT, D-Shine (Shen Yu), Xin Xiu, Zao An, Li Erxin, Er Wan, A Three, Shark, Rapeter, Hui Zi, Top Barry, Vinz-T, Winjay, Yamy, Naqi Wofu, Li Si Dan Ni, Ranzer, KKECHO, Melo, and Danko.

Each round, participants competed with individual stage performances to determine those who could battle or challenge for a seat in the "Hall of Fame" in the next round, with unsuccessful participants facing a subsequent elimination round. Participants also competed in 2 vs 2 group battles, along with group guest performances. Guests invited for a group stage include SKAIISYOURGOD, Nicky Lee, Lars, James, Yan Hao Xiang of TNT, and Miss Ko. From an adjacent show, six rappers; Nick Chou (NICKTHEREAL), Kyra Zilver, KAFE-HU, Clear, TRE, and SAYNO, competed with the remaining rappers to enter the All-Star season in episode 10. From these challengers, only Nick Chou (NICKTHEREAL) successfully made it into the show.

In the livestreamed finale on September 12, 2026, the top 5 rappers crowned into the "Hall of Fame" included Danko, Rapeter, KUNGFU-PEN, D-Shine (Shen Yu), and Yamy.

== Impact ==
The show quickly grew in popularity and reached 100 million views in four hours when its first episode aired. It accumulated 1.3 billion views in a little over a month. The show is credited for making hip hop mainstream in China, as several contestants rose to stardom and were signed to record deals.

=== Awards and nominations ===
The first season of The Rap of China received various awards:

- 2017 Weibo TV Influential ceremony, annual excellent online variety shows.
- 2018 iQiyi Screaming Night, annual producer and annual variety shows.
- The 2017 Sohu Fashion Festival, the hottest online variety show of the year.
- "New Weekly" "2017 China Video List", "Annual Program", "Annual Draft" two awards.
- 2017 China Variety Show Ingenuity Ceremony", seven awards including annual ingenuity editing, annual ingenuity visual effects, annual ingenuity brand marketing, annual ingenuity screenwriting, annual ingenuity Director, and gala work.
- The first Golden Mackerel Award, the 2017 Top Ten Network Comprehensive Awards.

== Controversies ==
The show has been accused of plagiarizing South Korean rap competition show Show Me the Money. There were rumors that iQiyi already bought the rights for the show from CJ E&M; however, Mnet stated "Show Me the Money is not the content which CJ E&M sold the rights."

In addition, since the release of "China Has Hip Hop", many rappers have released diss tracks about the show. NetEase Music has included a considerable number of diss songs on The Rap of China. Some rappers stated in their diss tracks that they and other rappers spent a lot of money and went to Beijing to compete in the show, but only appeared on screen for a few second, or not all. Producers of the show were accused of overlooking talented artists, and others critiqued the mentors invited by the show for being less talented than the participants. Other controversies included the inclusion of hanmai participants, as there is debate as to whether hanmai, a style of Chinese party rap, is considered hiphop. Many people emphatically blamed Kris Wu and Che Che, and affirmed their respect for some of the well-known rappers. Some netizens commented: "There is hip-hop in China, but not in iQiyi".

After the government cracked down on some of the participants in the first season, the second season and further were accused of being overly sanitized: contestants had to adhere strictly to Chinese nationalism and omit most references to sex, drugs, or cops.

== See also ==
- Rap Star, rap competition show on Mango TV
- Rap for Youth, rap competition show on Bilibili
