= Zhang Yuqi (singer) =

Chinese singer and songwriter

- 张钰琪
- Born: May 8, 2002 (age 24); Huangshi, Hubei, China
- Other name: Rachel Zed
- Education: Berklee College of Music
- Occupation: Singer-songwriter
- Years active: 2013–present
- Website: Sina Weibo

Zhang Yuqi (Chinese: 张钰琪; pinyin: Zhāng Yùqí; born May 8, 2002), also known as Rachel Zhang, is a Chinese singer-songwriter. In 2013, she participated in the Children's Singing Program of Hunan Television "Let's Sing Kids" and received attention. In 2019, she won the championship in the Tencent Video music talent show "The Coming One Girls" (also known as "The Coming One 3").

== Life and career ==
On May 8, 2001, Yuqi was born in Huangshi, Hubei, China. She learned singing, composing and dancing at an early age. In 2009, she moved to Wuhan, studied at Wuhan Experimental Foreign Language School and joined the school chorus. In 2011, she got the first place in the city's campus personal performance of red song singing. In October 2012, she participated in the "Rolling Stone 30" concert in Wuhan Station with the school chorus, and sang the opening song "Happy Paradise". Since then, Zhang Yuqi began to accept regular vocal training.

In 2013, she participated in the Children's Singing Program of Hunan Television "Let's Sing Kids" (first season), and joined the Hu Haiquan (Chinese singer) class, won the name of "a musical nuclear weapon". After the program, her performance received a lot of attention. Her video was posted on Sina Weibo and was once ranked fourth in the platform. On August 18 of the same year, she participated in the 2013 Daweishan (Hunan Province) summer festival camping music season "Cartoon Night" with another student of "Let's Sing Kids". In 2014, Zhang Yuqi and some of the participants of the season formed a "Let's Sing Kids (first season)" combination, and released on August 8 of that year—the first EP "New Sound Class one". In the same year, she participated in the "Let's Sing Kids" (Second Season), and joined the Shang Wenjie class. On September 20, Zhang Yuqi, Pan Yunqi and Lv Xingyang of " Let's Sing Kids 2" participated in the closing ceremony of the Golden Eagle Cartoon Maiji Children's Art Festival. On November 14, 2015, together with Pan Yunqi and Golden Eagle Cartoon "Flying Family", she participated in the Hunan Southern Special Joy World "Fangte Night • Mango FAN" Carnival Carnival.

On January 22, 2016, Zhang joined the 2016 "Chinese Culture Paradise" Excellent Talent Student Exchange Group hosted by Overseas Chinese Affairs Office and went to Australia in mid-February. On May 1, she participated in the "To Sing for Love" Super Children's Star Charity Concert National Tour Changsha Station; on the 28th, participated in the "Children's Dreams" Super Children's Charity Concert National Tour Foshan Station. On June 18, part of the "Let's Sing Kids" participants participated in Ningxiang Lushan Maisheng Music Carnival. On July 17, she participated in the Hunan IPTV parent-child singing program "The whole family sang children's songs" finals. On October 1, participants of the "Let's Sing Kids " participated in the 2016 Maiji Music Festival.

On January 2, 2017, she participated in the "Singing for Love" Super Child Singer Public Welfare Concert National Tour Wuhan Station. In the same year, she graduated from Yingge Middle School in Wuhan. And studied in an international school in Beijing and received the qualification of Berklee College of Music in the following year. In June 2019 She joined in the Tencent Video music talent show "The Coming One Girls" (also named "The Coming One 3") as a "Restart" track entrant. And finally on August 24, with 4.07 million points of support to win the title of "the strongest label" for the season (i.e., the champion). On October 31, 2019, Yuqi won the Future Shock Award of Freshasia Music Festival. She attended the 2020 Breakthrough Prize ceremony at NASA's Ames Research Center on November 3, 2019, in Mountain View, California, and sang her own song "Outside" for the ceremony.

== Discography ==
=== Let's Sing Kids (first season) ===
Studio album

No.	Class	Date	Title	Notes
1	Class 1 of Let's Sing Kids	August 8, 2014	1. Sunny Sky (太阳天空照); 2. Wish (心愿); 3. The End (终结) (Solo); 4. Never (绝不) (Solo); 5. The Leading Role (Mr.主角) (Solo); 6. Guardian angel (守护天使); 7. Galaxy on Summer Night (夏夜的银河); 8. Happy New Year	

Singles

Date	Title	Notes
January 15, 2014	Happy New Year	
March 31, 2014	Let's Adventure Together (我们去探险吧)	Theme song for "Crazy Maiji"

=== The Coming One Girls (The Coming One 3) ===
Singles

Date	Title	Notes
June 29, 2019	Baby Don't Cry	
July 13, 2019	Outside	
July 27, 2019	Answer (回答)	
August 17, 2019	Light of Heaven	
August 24, 2019	Another	
August 24, 2019	We Will Have a Clue (也许明天不再忧愁)	

== Television shows ==
=== Let's Sing Kids ===
No.	Date	Songs covered by Yuqi	Notes
1st season EP11	June 15, 2013	I'm a Little Bird (我是一只小小鸟)	
1st season EP15	July 7, 2013	Free as a Dream (像梦一样自由)	
1st season EP15	July 7, 2013	Dreamer on Air (空中的梦想家)	
1st season EP18	July 28, 2013	Initial Belief (最初的信仰)	
Special issue	November 1, 2013	Brave Heart (勇敢的心)	
2nd season EP2	June 7, 2014	For All Who Know My Name (给所有知道我名字的人)	
2nd season EP3	June 14, 2014	Guardian Dream (守护梦想)	
2nd season EP5	June 28, 2014	See You Again(再相见)	
2nd season EP7	July 12, 2014	Our Dream (我们的梦)	
2nd season EP10	August 2, 2014	Garrin Tribe (加林赛部落)	Received special mission award
2nd season EP11	August 9, 2014	Wish (心愿)	With Ruizhuo Wang
2nd season EP12	August 16, 2014	Journey (旅程)	
2nd season EP13	August 23, 2014	Back to Lhasa (回到拉萨)	With Xiangru Wang

=== The Coming One Girls (The Coming One 3) ===
No.	Date	Songs	Notes
EP2	June 29, 2019	Baby Don't Cry / Yuqi Zhang	Got six stars
EP2	June 29, 2019	The Moon Represents My Heart (月亮代表我的心) / Covered by Yuqi Zhang	Battled with other six-star participants and got five stars
EP3	July 6, 2019	Our Love (我们的爱) / Covered by Yuqi Zhang	Got three stars
EP4	July 13, 2019	Outside / Yuqi Zhang	Ranked eighth
EP5	July 20, 2019	Wave Rash (冲一波) / Covered by Yuqi Zhang	Got five stars
EP6	July 27, 2019	Answer (回答) / Yuqi Zhang	Ranked second
EP7	August 3, 2019	Don't Break My Heart / Covered by Yuqi Zhang	Got six stars, advanced to the top 14
EP8	August 10, 2019	Ivory boat (象牙舟) / Cooperated with Eric Tsai (or Weize Cai, from band "Fool and Idiot")	Ranked first, advanced to the top 8
EP9	August 17, 2019	Light of Heaven / Yuqi Zhang	Advanced to the top 4
EP10	August 24, 2019	I Don't Care (我管你) / Cooperated with Hua Chenyu	1st round
EP10	August 24, 2019	Another / Yuqi Zhang	2nd round, advanced to the top 3
EP10	August 24, 2019	Blue Lotus (蓝莲花) /Covered by Yuqi Zhang	3rd round, candidates for "the Strongest Label”
EP10	August 24, 2019	We Will Have a Clue (也许明天不再忧愁) / Yuqi Zhang	4th round, won "the Strongest Label" (champion)

=== Other shows ===
Date	Program	Platform	Notes
July 24, 2013	Happy Baby Go (快乐宝贝GO)	Golden Eagle Cartoon TV	
August 10, 2013	More Talk More Happy (越策越开心)	Hunan TV Finance Channel	
February 15, 2014	Crazy Maiji (疯狂的麦咭)	Golden Eagle Cartoon TV	
September 12, 2014	My Family Has a Star (我家有明星)	China BeijingTV Entertainment Channel	
February 6, 2016	Children Welcomes the New Year (宝贝迎新春)	Hunan TV Entertainment Channel	
September 8, 2018	Let's Sing Kids (fifth season) (中国新声代, 第五季)	Golden Eagle Cartoon TV	
October 27, 2019	Happy Camp (快乐大本营)	Hunan TV Entertainment Channel	
