= Second Hand Rose (band) =

Chinese rock band

Second Hand Rose (Chinese: 二手玫瑰; pinyin: èrshǒu méiguī) is a Chinese rock band from Beijing, formed in 1999 by musician Liang Long. It released the debut album in 2004. The band is known for blending traditional Chinese instruments with Western rock 'n' roll, as well as for its striking visual effects and whimsical lyrics.

== History ==
The band features exaggerated stage shapes and performances, and simple banter lyrics. Some media call it "China's most glamorous rock band" because of vocalist Liang Longnan dressing as a woman. The band is known for its combination of traditional Chinese instruments with rock and roll fundamentals, as evident in their use of traditional Chinese instruments in both their recordings and live performances. Their debut album, Second Hand Rose Band, was released in 2004 and received critical acclaim in China and positive reviews on specialist music websites in the U.S.

Long liked rock and roll when he was young, but he came from a Chinese state-owned enterprise family, and at that time, they did not accept the rural culture of the Northeast, and felt that such things were backward and rustic. Because his hometown was lagging behind, he wanted to leave. At the time, he preferred big-city pop culture and was even more eager after meeting the rock band Black Panther from Beijing. While learning guitar, Liang Long met Sun Baoqi. In order to become a rock musician, Liang Long gave up the advantage of distributing jobs to the children of Chinese state-owned enterprises and went to Harbin where he worked as a security guard to save money to study music. In Harbin he met Wen Heng, Ma Chunyu, Ma Jinbing and brought Sun Baoqi on board, forming "black lens band". The Black Lens disbanded soon after forming because their members couldn't afford the stress of life. Each of the members went to find jobs. Liang long went to Beijing to continue to look for opportunities, but because his work was not favored by the record companies, his (retired) parents lost money. He had to return to Harbin penniless. He travelled to Beijing and submitted his own songs to various record companies in the hope of being appreciated, but he did not receive a response.

The group was formed in August 2000. Before the release of their second album, the band was known as "Second Hand Rose Band". The word "Band" was dropped with the release of their second album, and they are now merely known as "Second Hand Rose". Over the years, the lineup of the band has changed frequently. Lead singer Liang Long and Chinese traditional instrument player Wu Zekun are the only two band members who have been with the band since it was formed, although guitar player Yao Lan has been with the band for several years.

Liang Long has been known to dress as a woman on stage; in recent years, he has worn more conventional clothes during performances and shaved off his long hair. Hailing from the Heilongjiang province in the N-E China, he has earned the band controversy in their native country, China, with his stage antics and flamboyant look.

In 2002, Second Hand Rose became the only foreign band to be invited to play at the Swiss Snow Mountain Music Festival, an annual event attracting some of Switzerland's established musical names. They were also one of the few Chinese rock bands invited to perform in Shanghai at the 2003 China-Japan Pop Music Exchange Concerts, an event organized by Japan's public broadcaster, NHK. When the Amsterdam China Festival was held in the Netherlands in 2004, Second Hand Rose was also one of the bands invited.

The band (Liang Long with a new line-up) released their second album in late 2006. Critics and online media in mainland China have praised the ten new studio recordings featured in the album "Yu Le Jiang Hu" (娱乐江湖).

In 2009, the band released their music EP "Lover".

In 2012, the band released their third music album, "Out of the Cage And Sing".

In 2013, the album "Stealing The Show" was released in Hong Kong, Macao and Taiwan, and the second-hand Rose World Tour was held at the same time.

In March 2014, they won the Best Group and Band award on the 14th Music Chart.

In January 2016, the multi-media interactive exhibition "Allow some artists to get rich first".

In 2017, the 54th Taiwan Film Golden Horse Award for "Best Original Film Song" was nominated for the song "Lullaby".

The video clip for the first single, 狼心狗肺, was also included on the release. The band mainly performs in Beijing, but they tour to other Chinese cities to perform as well. Although they are one of China's most popular rock bands, they remain an alternative act with a non-mainstream following.

In 2021, joined the original female musician competition reality show "Burst Stage" as a collaborative guest.

On June 25, 2022, the variety show "Praise for Songs Season 2" was scheduled to be broadcast on TikTok and Zhejiang Satellite TV.

In 2023, they participated in the third season of "The Big Band “

Nowadays, Second Hand Rose are more involved in cross-border collaborations, initiating rock exhibitions, art collaborations, and other projects, becoming a cultural symbol.

== Line-up ==
- Liang Long (梁龙), vocals, guitar
- Yao Lan (姚澜), lead guitar
- Li Ziqiang (李自强), bass
- Wu Zekun (吴泽琨), Chinese traditional instruments
- Sun Quan (孙权), drums

== Discography ==
- 2004 – Second Hand Rose Band (二手玫瑰)
- 2005 – 玫开二度
- 2006 – The World of Entertainment (娱乐江湖) (CD + VCD)
- 2009 – Lover (情儿) (CD+DVD)
- 2010 – Everyone Wants To Be The Leader Singer (人人有颗主唱的心)
- 2013 – Stealing The Show (一枝独秀)
