= GAI (musician) =

Chinese rapper and singer

GAI 周延
- Born: March 22, 1987 (age 38); Yibin, Sichuan, China
- Occupation(s): Rapper, singer, songwriter
- Spouse: Wang Siran
- Children: 1

Chinese name
- Simplified Chinese: 周延
Transcriptions
Standard Mandarin
- Hanyu Pinyin: Zhōu Yán
- Website: https://www.instagram.com/gai_zhou/?hl=en

Zhou Yan (born March 22, 1987), more commonly known by his stage name GAI, is a Chinese rapper, singer and songwriter. GAI was the co-champion of the first season of The Rap of China and is one of the more prominent hip hop musicians from Chongqing.

== Early life ==
GAI was born in Weiyuan County, Neijiang City, Sichuan Province. He relocated to Chongqing and joined the Chongqing hip-hop rap label GO$H, spending time in the city's underground clubs. His stage name GAI is a childhood nickname meaning "lid" (gài) (盖) that he was given because of his bowl cut.

== Career ==
On September 15, 2015, GAI released his personal hip-hop rap single "Daydreamer". On November 11, a personal hip-hop rap single titled "Cute Girl" was released.

GAI became more widely known in China after joining hip hop competition The Rap of China in 2017, which is often seen as the mainstream debut of Chinese hip hop on mainland television. The iQiyi reality competition garnered 2.5 billion online views within China. GAI was the co-winner of the first season, and has maintained his relevance in the hip hop scene with various digital tracks, usually mixing Chongqing and other Southwest Chinese dialects with Mandarin in his tracks. He was among the first prominent rappers from Chongqing, which has now become a notable hub for hip hop in China.

He has since appeared on multiple reality TV programs, including Call Me By Fire, and I Am a Singer.

GAI has faced censorship issues from the regulatory authorities in China, notably being removed from Hunan Television's reality show I Am a Singer mid-season in 2018, during a government crackdown on hip hop. He was presumably targeted due to his early works that glorified crime. However, he has responded by integrating traditional Chinese poetry, music, and literature, particularly historical martial arts tales, into his music, and added patriotic themes celebrating China's illustrious history in his works. This nationalist approach has kept his work acceptable to both the public and the government. He returned as a judge for the fourth season of The Rap of China in 2020.

== Other activities ==
On November 7, 2017, GAI attended the DOOR&KEY brand press conference and donated the 1 million prize money earned from participating in The Rap of China to Hope Project, establishing a happy music classroom for children in mountainous areas.
