= Tang Tian (songwriter) =

Chinese songwriter

Tang Tian (born 1983; Chinese: 唐恬; pinyin: Táng Tián) is a Chinese lyricist. Her notable works include: As Wished (如愿), A Lifelong Journey (人世间), theme song for TV series A Lifelong Journey, The Lonely Warrior (孤勇者), Hua kai wang you (花开忘忧), Gui tu you feng (归途有风). She frequently collaborates with composer Qian Lei (钱雷), and singers including Faye Wong, Eason Chan, and Zhou Shen.

In 2012, she was diagnosed with third stage of nasopharynx cancer, of which she recovered from in 2013.

In November 2021, Eason Chan released a song, The Lonely Warrior (孤勇者), as the Chinese soundtrack to the television series, Arcane: League of Legends. The song was written by Tang, who drew on her experience overcoming the cancer prognosis. It would become one of the most popular songs in China in the remaining months of 2021 through to 2022, when it was being nominated as one of the songs to be played during the semi-finals of 2022 FIFA World Cup in December 2022.

In 2022, she won the Best Lyrics award at Chinese Top Ten Music Awards. In January 2023, she was awarded the Lyricist Award at the 2022 Weibo Music Festival.
