= Tian Tang =

Chinese-Canadian mechanical engineer

Tian Tang (born 1980) is a mechanical engineer whose research studies the interfaces of soft matter, and the ways that organic and inorganic material can combine at the nanoscale, including emulsification by asphaltenes and the biomimetic applications of fibrillar interfaces. Educated in China and the US, she works in Canada as a professor in the Mechanical Engineering Department of the University of Alberta, where she holds a tier 1 Canada Research Chair in Multiscale Modeling of Soft Materials and Interfaces.

== Education and career ==
Tang was born in 1980 in Pingjiang County, and educated in Yueyang. She received a bachelor's degree in engineering mechanics in 2001 from Tsinghua University. She came to the US for doctoral study in theoretical and applied mathematics at Cornell University, where she completed her Ph.D. in 2005. Her dissertation, Mechanics of adhesion from micron to nano scales, was supervised by Chung Yuen (Herbert) Hui.

After postdoctoral research as a visiting research scientist at Lehigh University, she moved to Canada as an assistant professor of mechanical engineering at the University of Alberta in 2007. She was promoted to associate professor in 2011 and full professor in 2015. Initially, she had a tier 2 Canada Research Chair in Nano-biomolecular Hybrid Materials, renewed in 2013. In 2021 she was given a tier 1 Canada Research Chair in Multiscale Modeling of Soft Materials and Interfaces.

== Recognition ==
The University of Alberta has awarded Tang a Killam Annual Professorship, their Martha Cook Piper Research Prize, their Rutherford Award for Excellence in Undergraduate Teaching, and their University Cup. She was elected to the Canadian Academy of Engineering in 2025.
