= Singer season 2 =

Singer
- Season 2
- Hosted by: Chang Yu (Episode 1–10, Breakout); Hu Haiquan (Semifinal, 2014 Biennial Concert); Wang Han, He Jiong (Final Round)
- Judges: 500 public audiences
- Winner: Han Lei
- Runner-up: G.E.M.
- Finals venue: Hunan Broadcasting System

Release
- Original network: Hunan Television
- Original release: January 3 – April 11, 2014

Season chronology
- ← Previous; Season 1 Next → Season 3

I Am a Singer (season 2), is the second season of the Chinese TV series I Am a Singer produced by Hunan TV, produced by Hong Tao, and the show's music director is Kubert Leung.

The season premiered on January 3, 2014, and concluded on April 4, 2014, with a live Biennial concert aired on April 11, 2014. Chinese Singer Han Lei was the winner of the season, with Hong Kong singer G.E.M. finishing as runner-up.

== Competition format ==
Most of the competition format were retained from the first season, with seven singers each week singing for a 500-member audience; they then cast their ballots for the top three singers of their preference after all the singers had performed. Both the Qualifying and Knockout round scores are combined and decide which singer with a fewer vote share was eliminated.

This season introduced format changes to the Revival round, which renamed to Breakouts; any first-round singers who survived every elimination rounds were automatically exempt and thus guaranteeing one of seven places in the finals; remaining singers compete along with eliminated singers to vie for the remaining places in the finals, where the number is seven minus the number of exempted singers. Another change made is to the withdrawn singers, singers who voluntarily withdrew from the competition without performing have not been eligible for return performances, in addition to being ineligible to participate in the Breakout rounds. In the previous season, Chyi Chin (who withdrew from the competition on week 7) was given return performance on week 10, but Chin was not eligible from participating the Revival round.

This is also the first season to feature Biennial Concert, aired one week after the finals. Unlike other weeks, Biennial concert is a live-telecast exhibition performance with no voting featuring the best singers of the season plus selected singers from former seasons, similar to Graduation in the original Korean franchise.

== Contestants ==
The following singers participated in the second season listed in alphabetical order (singers without a placement for the final is listed as finalist and singers withdrew were listed as withdrawn):

Key:

– Winner
– Runner-up
– Other finalist
– Withdrew

Contestant	Country	Manager	Status	Week Entered	Week Exited	Result
Phil Chang	Taiwan	YOYO	Initial singer	Week 1 (Qualifying round 1)	Week 13 (Finals)	Finalist (6th-7th place)
Gary Chaw	Malaysia	Tian Yuan	Initial singer	Week 1 (Qualifying round 1); Week 11 (Breakout round)	Week 2 (Knockout round 1); Week 13 (Finals)	Finalist (4th-5th place)
G.E.M.	Hong Kong	Lidia	Initial singer	Week 1 (Qualifying round 1)	Week 13 (Finals)	Runner-up
Han Lei	China	Li Rui	Initial singer	Week 1 (Qualifying round 1)	Week 13 (Finals)	Winner
Luo Qi	China	Wang Qiao	Initial singer	Week 1 (Qualifying round 1)	Week 6 (Knockout round 3)	Withdrew
Man Wenjun	China	Wang Qiao	Substitute singer	Week 7 (Qualifying round 4)	Week 8 (Knockout round 4); Week 11 (Breakout round)	Eliminated
Power Station	Taiwan	Eliza Liang	Substitute singer	Week 9 (Qualifying round 5)	Week 11 (Breakout round)	Eliminated
Shila Amzah	Malaysia	Jeffrey G	Substitute singer	Week 7 (Qualifying round 4)	Week 13 (Finals)	2nd Runner-up
Wei Wei	China	Du Haitao	Initial singer	Week 1 (Qualifying round 1)	Week 4 (Knockout round 2); Week 11 (Breakout round)	Eliminated
Victor Wong	Malaysia	Shen Mengchen	Substitute singer	Week 5 (Qualifying round 3)	Week 6 (Knockout round 3); Week 11 (Breakout round)	Eliminated
Jason Zhang	China	Shen Ling	Substitute singer	Week 3 (Qualifying round 2)	Week 13 (Finals)	Finalist (4th-5th place)
Bibi Zhou	China	Oscar Sun	Initial singer	Week 1 (Qualifying round 1)	Week 13 (Finals)	Finalist (6th-7th place)

=== Future appearances ===
Han Lei, Gary Chaw, Jason Zhang and Bibi Zhou returned as guest performers for the Biennial concert on the third season the following year. Han again returned as a guest performer in the finale of the fourth season for an all-winners exhibition performance.

Zhang returned as a contestant on the fifth season. Shang Wenjie, G.E.M., and Zhang returned again as a guest assistant singers on the finale of the fifth, sixth, and seventh seasons, respectively.

== Results ==
First	Safe	Bottom	Eliminated	Return Performance	Breakout Success	Breakout Failure	Winner	Runner-up	Withdrew

	Singer	Broadcast Date (2014)														
	Singer	3 Jan	10 Jan	17 Jan	24 Jan	31 Jan	7 Feb	21 Feb	28 Feb	7 Mar	14 Mar	21 Mar	28 Mar	4 Apr		
	Singer	1st Round		2nd Round		3rd Round		4th Round		5th Round		Breakout	Semifinal	Final Round		
	Singer	Qualifying	Knockout	Qualifying	Knockout	Qualifying	Knockout	Qualifying	Knockout	Qualifying	Knockout	Breakout	Semifinal	1st Round	2nd Round	Overall
1	Han Lei	1	4	4	3	6	2	1	2	1	5	—	1	1	1	1
2	G.E.M.	5	2	1	1	2	1	4	5	2	1	—	2	2	2	2
=3	Shila Amzah	—	—	—	—	—	—	2	4	3	3	1	6	3	—	—
=3	Gary Chaw	4	7	—	—	—	—	—	—	—	—	3	4	4	—	—
=3	Jason Zhang	—	—	3	6	3	3	3	1	4	4	2	3	5	—	—
=6	Bibi Zhou	7	3	5	2	5	5	7	3	5	2	—	5	—	—	—
=6	Phil Chang	6	5	6	4	4	6	5	6	7	6	—	7	—	—	—
=8	Power Station	—	—	—	—	—	—	—	—	6	7	4	—	—	—	—
=8	Man Wenjun	—	—	—	—	—	—	6	7	—	—	5	—	—	—	—
=8	Wei Wei	2	1	7	7	—	—	—	—	—	—	6	—	—	—	—
=8	Victor Wong	—	—	—	—	7	7	—	—	—	—	7	—	—	—	—
=8	Luo Qi	3	6	2	5	1	4	—	—	—	—	—	—	—	—	—

== Details of competitions ==
=== 1st round ===
==== Qualifying ====
- Taping Date: December 19, 2013
- Airdate: January 3, 2014

This episode featured the winning duo from the last season, Yu Quan; however, a majority of their performance was edited out of broadcast due to time constraints.

I Am a Singer Season 2 1st Qualifying Round January 3, 2014 Host: Phil Chang
Order of Performance	Singer	Comedian Manager	Song Title	Original Singer	Lyrics	Composer	Arranger	Ranking
1	Phil Chang	YOYO	"月亮惹的禍"	Phil Chang	Tracy	Phil Chang	陳傑漢	6 ^{[a]}
2	G.E.M.	Lidia	"泡沫"	G.E.M.			Lupo Groinig	5 ^{[b]}
3	Bibi Zhou	Oscar Sun	"別愛我，像愛個朋友"	Bibi Zhou	娃娃	David Tao	Kubert Leung	7 ^{[c]}
3	Bibi Zhou	Oscar Sun	"解脫"	A-mei	Daryl Yao	許華強	Kubert Leung	7 ^{[c]}
4	Han Lei	Li Rui	"等待"	Han Lei	葛根塔娜	張宏光	Kubert Leung	1 ^{[d]}
5	Luo Qi	Wang Qiao	"隨心所欲"	Luo Qi	洛兵	獨草	史小鵬 張彧	3 ^{[e]}
6	Gary Chaw	Tian Yuan	"背叛"	Gary Chaw	阿丹 鄔裕康	Gary Chaw	Kubert Leung	4
7	Wei Wei	Du Haitao	"戀尋"	Wei Wei	郭峰		劉岳	2
8	Yu Quan	—	"回家鄉"	Yu Quan	Yu Quan 邊疆	Gordon Davis; Flood	Chokkaku	Guest Performance

A. Voted 4th in the 40s and 50s age group
B. Voted 1st in the 10s age group
C. Voted 6th in the 20s and 50s age group
D. Voted 1st in the 20s, 30s and 50s age group
E. Voted 3rd in the 40s and 50s age group

==== Knockout ====
- Taping Date: December 26, 2013
- Airdate: January 10, 2014

I Am a Singer Season 2 1st Knockout Round January 10, 2014 Host: Phil Chang
Order of Performance	Singer	Comedian Manager	Song Title	Original Singer	Lyrics	Composer	Arranger	Ranking
1	Han Lei	Li Rui	"嫂子頌"	Li Na	裘逸	張千一		4 ^{[a]}
2	Bibi Zhou	Oscar Sun	"煩"	Shino Lin	Sandee Chan		Pyo Keun Soo	3 ^{[b]}
3	Gary Chaw	Tian Yuan	"我很丑可是我很温柔"	Chao Chuan	李格弟	Kay Huang	Kubert Leung; Kay Huang; Cao Ge	7
4	Phil Chang	YOYO	"我是真的爱你"	Jeff Chang	Jonathan Lee		屠穎	5 ^{[d]}
5	Luo Qi	Wang Qiao	"我期待"	Chang Yu Sheng			史小鵬 劉銳	6 ^{[f]}
6	G.E.M.	Lidia	"存在"	Wang Feng			John Laudon; G.E.M. Lupo Groinig	2 ^{[e]}
7	Wei Wei	Du Haitao	"在水一方"	江蕾; Irene Tam	Chiung Yao	Lin Chia Ching	劉岳	1 ^{[f]}

A. Voted 2nd in the 50s age group
B. Voted 1st in the 30s age group
C. Voted 4th in the 40s age group
D. Voted 4th in the 10s and 30 age group
E. Voted 1st in the 10s, 20s and 40s age group
F. Voted 1st in the 30s and 50s age group

==== Overall ranking ====
I Am a Singer Season 2 1st Round Overall Ranking
Ranking	Singer	Match 1 Percentages of Votes (Ranking)	Match 2 Percentages of Votes (Ranking)	Total Percentages of Votes
1	Wei Wei	17.06% (2)	20.25% (1)	18.66%
2	G.E.M.	13.57% (5) ^{[a]}	19.85% (2)	16.71%
3	Han Lei	20.63% (1)	11.46% (4)	16.04%
4	Luo Qi	15.25% (3)	11.26% (6)	13.25%
5	Bibi Zhou	7.66% (7)	18.77% (3)	13.22%
6	Phil Chang	12.16% (6)	11.33% (5)	11.74%
7	Gary Chaw	13.64% (4)	7.04% (7)	10.33%

A. Has one vote less with 4th place singer

=== 2nd round ===
==== Qualifying ====
- Taping Date: January 9, 2014
- Airdate: January 17, 2014

The first substitute singer of the season was Jason Zhang.

I Am a Singer Season 2 2nd Qualifying Round January 17, 2014 Host: Phil Chang
Order of Performance	Singer	Comedian Manager	Song Title	Original Singer	Lyrics	Composer	Arranger	Ranking
1	Phil Chang	YOYO	"袖手旁观"	Chyi Chin	Yao Chien	Huang Kuo Lun	Kubert Leung	6 ^{[a]}
2	Luo Qi	Wang Qiao	"Knockin' On Heaven's Door" (English)	Bob Dylan			史小鵬	2 ^{[b]}
3	Wei Wei	Du Haitao	"女人花"	Mui Yim Fong	Preston Lee	Chan Yiu Chuen	Kubert Leung	7 ^{[c]}
4	Han Lei	Li Rui	"可愛的一朵玫瑰花"	Kazakhs folk song	Wang Luobin		羅寧	4
5	G.E.M.	Lidia	"你把我灌醉"	David Wong	Daryl Yao	David Wong	Lupo Groinig	1 ^{[d]}
6	Bibi Zhou	Oscar Sun	"Cry-哭了"	Mavis Fan	James Li		Pyo Keun Soo	5 ^{[e]}
7	Jason Zhang	Shen Ling	"勿忘心安"	Jason Zhang	裴育	曲世聰		3 ^{[f]}
8	Gary Chaw	Tian Yuan	"Greatest Love Of All" (English)	George Benson; Whitney Houston	Michael Masser; Linda Creed		Pyo Keun Soo	Return Performance

A. Voted 4th in the 20s age group
B. Voted 2nd in the 20s and 30s age group
C. Voted 5th in the 50s age group
D. Voted 1st in the 10s, 20s and 30s age group
E. Voted 4th in the 10s and 30s age group
F. Voted 2nd in the 10s and 50s age group

==== Knockout ====
- Taping Date: January 16, 2014
- Airdate: January 23, 2014

Chang and G.E.M. were originally going to perform 1st and 3rd, respectively, but swapped after a mutual agreement with both singers. Luo also requested to swap their performance order with Wei, but refused.

I Am a Singer Season 2 2nd Knockout Round January 24, 2014 Host: Phil Chang
Order of Performance	Singer	Comedian Manager	Song Title	Original Singer	Lyrics	Composer	Arranger	Ranking
1	G.E.M.	Lidia	"我要我們在一起"	Mavis Fan	James Li		Lupo Groinig; G.E.M. Doug Petty	1 ^{[a]}
2	Wei Wei	Du Haitao	"太陽最紅毛主席最親"	卞小貞	付林	王錫仁	Kubert Leung	7
3	Phil Chang	YOYO	"Harder To Breathe"	Maroon 5	Jesse Carmichael; Adam Levine		Again	4 ^{[b]}
4	Luo Qi	Wang Qiao	"我相信"	Yang Pei-An	Liu Yu Rui	陳國華	史小鵬 張彧	5 ^{[c]}
5	Jason Zhang	Shen Ling	"聽你聽我"	A-mei	光禹	陳志遠	劉迦寧	6 ^{[d]}
6	Han Lei	Li Rui	"暗香"	Sha Baoliang	陳濤	三寶	Kim Ji Mun; Kubert Leung	3 ^{[e]}
7	Bibi Zhou	Oscar Sun	"青蘋果樂園"	Xiao Hu Dui	丁曉雯	Jimmy Johnson	Pyo Keun Soo	2 ^{[f]}

A. Voted 1st in the 20s, 30s and 40s age group
B. Voted 3rd in the 10s and 40s age group
C. Voted 4th in the 40s age group
D. Voted 4th in the 10s age group
E. Voted 2nd in the 50s age group
F. Voted 1st in the 10s age group

==== Overall ranking ====
I Am a Singer Season 2 2nd Round Overall Ranking
Ranking	Singer	Match 1 Percentages of Votes (Ranking)	Match 2 Percentages of Votes (Ranking)	Total Percentages of Votes
1	G.E.M.	28.29% (1)	24.64% (1)	26.47%
2	Bibi Zhou	10.36% (5)	20.70% (2)	15.53%
3	Luo Qi	18.60% (2)	11.35% (5)	14.98%
4	Jason Zhang	18.00% (3)	10.08% (6)	14.04%
5	Han Lei	10.66% (4)	14.29% (3)	12.48%
6	Phil Chang	8.85% (6)	13.76% (4)	11.31%
7	Wei Wei	5.21% (7)	5.14% (7)	5.18%

=== 3rd round ===
==== Qualifying ====
- Taping Date: January 23, 2014
- Airdate: January 31, 2014

The second substitute singer of the season was Victor Wong.

I Am a Singer Season 2 3rd Qualifying Round January 31, 2014 Host: Phil Chang
Order of Performance	Singer	Comedian Manager	Song Title	Original Singer	Lyrics	Composer	Arranger	Ranking
1	G.E.M.	Lidia	"If I Were a Boy" (English)	Beyoncé	Alexander Lee; Hopkins J.C	Beyoncé	Lupo Groinig	2 ^{[a]}
2	Bibi Zhou	Oscar Sun	"慢慢"	Jacky Cheung	白進法	Kevin Lin	Pyo Keun Soo	5 ^{[b]}
3	Luo Qi	Wang Qiao	"我是一隻小小鳥"	Chao Chuan; Ding Dang	Jonathan Lee		史小鵬 張 彧	1 ^{[c]}
4	Han Lei	Li Rui	"千言萬語"	Teresa Teng; Evon Low	Charles Tso		Kubert Leung	6 ^{[d]}
5	Phil Chang	YOYO	"迷迭香"	Jay Chou	Vincent Fang	Jay Chou	Kubert Leung	4 ^{[e]}
6	Jason Zhang	Shen Ling	"Black or White" (English)	Michael Jackson			Pyo Keun Soo	3 ^{[f]}
7	Victor Wong	Shen Mengchen	"掌心"	Michael & Victor	王欲宗	Michael Wong	Kubert Leung	7 ^{[g]}
8	Wei Wei	Du Haitao	"好人一生平安"	Li Na	易茗	雷雷	Kubert Leung	Return Performance

A. Voted 1st in the 10s and 20s age group
B. Voted 4th in the 30s age group
C. Voted 1st in the 30s, 40s and 50s age group
D. Voted 5th in the 30s and 40s age group
E. Voted 4th in the 10s, 20s and 40s age group
F. Voted 2nd in the 50s age group
G. Voted 5th in the 50s age group

==== Knockout ====
- Taping Date: January 30, 2014
- Airdate: February 7, 2014

Wong and Zhang were originally going to perform 1st and 4th, respectively, but were later changed when Zhang Jie requested to reorder his performance along Wong Pin Kuan, as well as G.E.M. having to retake her performance due to a headphone malfunction. Luo withdrew from the competition prior to the results due to her pregnancy (she was seven-months pregnant at time of taping and that her expected delivery is near), but cited that she will return. The eliminations for the Knockout round went ahead as normal.

I Am a Singer Season 2 3rd Knockout Round February 7, 2014 Host: Phil Chang
Order of Performance	Singer	Comedian Manager	Song Title	Original Singer	Lyrics	Composer	Arranger	Ranking
1	Jason Zhang	Shen Ling	"我的未来不是梦"	Chang Yu-sheng; Sha Jia Wei; Sodagreen	陳家麗	翁孝良	Pyo Keun Soo	3
2	Han Lei	Li Rui	"天邊"	Buren Bayaer	吉爾格楞	烏蘭托嘎	那日森; Kubert Leung	2
3	Bibi Zhou	Oscar Sun	"愛火花" (Cantonese)	Jacky Cheung	Gene Lau	Telsuro Oda; Kang Jin-hwa	Pyo Keun Soo	5
4	Victor Wong	Shen Mengchen	"我不難過"	Stefanie Sun	楊明學	Lee Shih Shiong	DONSPIKE	7
5	G.E.M.	Lidia	"喜欢你" (Cantonese)	Beyond	Wong Ka Kui		Lupo Groinig	1
6	Phil Chang	YOYO	"離愛不遠"	David Wong			袁芬達	6
7	Luo Qi	Wang Qiao	"给所有知道我名字的人"	Chao Chuan	Jonathan Lee	Liu Tianjian	史小鵬 張彧	4

==== Overall ranking ====
I Am a Singer Season 2 3rd Round Overall Ranking
Ranking	Singer	Match 1 Percentages of Votes (Ranking)	Match 2 Percentages of Votes (Ranking)	Total Percentages of Votes
1	G.E.M.	21.01% (2)	22.89% (1)	21.96%
2	Luo Qi	21.70% (1)	16.86% (4)	19.25%
3	Jason Zhang	18.20% (3)	16.93% (3)	17.55%
4	Han Lei	8.44% (6)	17.60% (2)	13.08%
5	Bibi Zhou	10.57% (5)	12.04% (5)	11.32%
6	Phil Chang	12.01% (4)	9.57% (6)	10.77%
7	Victor Wong	8.03% (7)	4.08% (7)	6.03%

=== 4th round ===
==== Qualifying ====
- Taping Date: February 13, 2014
- Airdate: February 21, 2014

Due to Luo's withdrawal, one more singer for a total of two singers substituted the singers; they were Man Wenjun and Shila Amzah. During this week, Zhou forget to bring the headphone when performing.

I Am a Singer Season 2 4th Qualifying Round February 21, 2014 Host: Phil Chang
Order of Performance	Singer	Comedian Manager	Song Title	Original Singer	Lyrics	Composer	Arranger	Ranking
1	Man Wenjun	Wang Qiao	"我需要你"	Man Wenjun	劉沁		撈仔	6
2	Phil Chang	YOYO	"不要來找我"	Faith Yang	Chang Chen Yue		Again	5
3	Jason Zhang	Shen Ling	"无情的情书"	Power Station	李素珍 許常德	Liu Tianjian	黎明鑫	3
4	Bibi Zhou	Oscar Sun	"黑色柳丁"	David Tao	David Tao 陳玉貞	David Tao	Pyo Keun Soo	7
5	G.E.M.	Lidia	"如果没有你"	Karen Mok; Vincy Chan	左安安; Francis Lee	左安安	Doug Petty; Lupo Groinig	4
6	Han Lei	Li Rui	"愛的箴言"	Teresa Teng	Lo Ta Yu		羅寧	1
7	Shila Amzah	Jeffrey G	"想你的夜"	Guan Zhe			Kubert Leung	2
8	Victor Wong	Shen Mengchen	"我不愿让你一个人"	Mayday	Ashin	Ming; Chen Hsin Hung	Kubert Leung	Return Performance

==== Knockout ====
- Taping Date: February 20, 2014
- Airdate: February 28, 2014

Zhou and Shila were originally going to perform 4th and 7th respectively, but were changed when Chang and Man also requested to reorder the performance as well.

I Am a Singer Season 2 4th Knockout Round February 28, 2014 Host: Phil Chang
Order of Performance	Singer	Comedian Manager	Song Title	Original Singer	Lyrics	Composer	Arranger	Ranking
1	G.E.M.	Lidia	"Lady Marmalade" (English)	Labelle; Sabrina Salerno; All Saints; Christina Aguilera, Lil' Kim, Mýa and Pink	Kenny Nolan		Lupo Groinig	5
2	Phil Chang	YOYO	"祝我幸福"	Faith Yang	施立	陳小霞	Kubert Leung	6
3	Jason Zhang	Shen Ling	"夜空中最亮的星"	Escape Plan			劉迦寧	1
4	Shila Amzah	Jeffrey G	"最長的電影"	Jay Chou			Kubert Leung	4
5	Han Lei	Li Rui	"送別"	學堂樂歌	Hong Yi	John P. Ordway	那日森	2
6	Man Wenjun	Wang Qiao	"不願一個人"	Wakin Chau			撈仔	7
7	Bibi Zhou	Oscar Sun	"時間都去哪兒了"	Reno Wang	董鼕鼕	Chen Xi	Pyo Keun Soo	3

==== Overall ranking ====
I Am a Singer Season 2 4th Round Overall Ranking
Ranking	Singer	Match 1 Percentages of Votes (Ranking)	Match 2 Percentages of Votes (Ranking)	Total Percentages of Votes
1	Jason Zhang	18.37% (3) ^{[a]}	23.00% (1)	20.68%
2	Han Lei	20.25% (1) ^{[b]}	18.89% (2)	19.57%
3	Shila Amzah	19.98% (2) ^{[c]}	14.41% (4)	17.22%
4	G.E.M.	12.40% (4) ^{[d]}	13.36% (5)	12.88%
5	Bibi Zhou	7.84% (7) ^{[e]}	15.58% (3)	11.70%
6	Phil Chang	11.60% (5) ^{[f]}	7.69% (6)	9.65%
7	Man Wenjun	9.52% (6) ^{[g]}	7.01% (7)	8.27%

A. Zhang garnered 274 votes in the first round.
B. Han garnered 302 votes in the first round.
C. Shila garnered 298 votes in the first round.
D. G.E.M. garnered 185 votes in the first round.
E. Zhou garnered 117 votes in the first round.
F. Chang garnered 173 votes in the first round.
G. Man garnered 142 votes in the first round.

=== 5th round ===
==== Qualifying (Ultimate Qualifying Round) ====
- Taping Date: February 27, 2014
- Airdate: March 7, 2014

The season's last substitute singer was Power Station. G.E.M. and Chang were originally going to perform 2nd and 5th respectively, but later swapped when both singers mutually agreed their request.

I Am a Singer Season 2 5th Qualifying Round March 7, 2014 Host: Phil Chang
Order of Performance	Singer	Comedian Manager	Song Title	Original Singer	Lyrics	Composer	Arranger	Ranking
1	Jason Zhang	Shen Ling	"Angel" (English)	Sarah McLachlan; Jackie Evancho	Sarah McLachlan		劉迦寧	4
2	Phil Chang	YOYO	"浪人情歌"	Wu Bai			華正群	7
3	Han Lei	Li Rui	"花房姑娘"	Cui Jian			那日森	1
4	Shila Amzah	Jeffrey G	"Listen" (English)	Beyoncé	Henry Krieger; Scott Cutler; Anne Preven; Beyoncé Knowles		Kubert Leung	3
5	G.E.M.	Lidia	"龍捲風"	Jay Chou	Vivian Hsu	Jay Chou	Lupo Groinig	2
6	Bibi Zhou	Oscar Sun	"趁早"	A-mei; Andy Law; Angeline Wong; Phil Chang	十一郎	Bibi Zhou	Pyo Keun Soo	5
7	Power Station	Eliza Liang	"當"	Power Station	Chiung Yao	莊立帆 郭文宗	溫亦哲	6
8	Man Wenjun	Wang Qiao	"靠近"	Harlem Yu	Yao chien	Harlem Yu	Kubert Leung 撈仔	Return Performance

==== Knockout (Ultimate Knockout Round) ====
- Taping Date: March 6, 2014
- Airdate: March 14, 2014

I Am a Singer Season 2 5th Knockout Round March 14, 2014 Host: Phil Chang
Order of Performance	Singer	Comedian Manager	Song Title	Original Singer	Lyrics	Composer	Arranger	Ranking
1	G.E.M.	Lidia	"Fallin'" (English)	Alicia Keys			G.E.M. Lupo Groinig; Kubert Leung	1
2	Han Lei	Li Rui	"北京北京"	Wang Feng			那日森	5
3	Jason Zhang	Shen Ling	"愛什麼稀罕"	A-mei	David Tao 範中芬		鐮田俊哉	4
4	Phil Chang	YOYO	"假行僧"	Cui Jian			Again	6
5	Shila Amzah	Jeffrey G	"Forever Love" (English)	Wang Leehom	Wang Leehom 十方 何啟宏 於景雯	Wang Leehom	Kubert Leung	3
6	Power Station	Eliza Liang	"酒矸倘賣無"	Su Rui	Lo Ta Yu; Hou Dejian	Hou Dejian	Kubert Leung	7
7	Bibi Zhou	Oscar Sun	"管他什麼音樂"	Mavis Fan	何啟弘	金木義則	Pyo Keun Soo	2
7	Bibi Zhou	Oscar Sun	"Thank You For The Music" (English)	ABBA	B.Andersson; B.Ulvaus		Pyo Keun Soo	2

==== Overall ranking ====
I Am a Singer Season 2 5th Round Overall Ranking
Ranking	Singer	Match 1 Percentages of Votes (Ranking)	Match 2 Percentages of Votes (Ranking)	Total Percentages of Votes
1	G.E.M.	20.36% (2)	19.21% (1)	19.79%
2	Han Lei	27.06% (1)	11.37% (5)	19.22%
3	Shila Amzah	15.08% (3)	16.33% (3)	15.71%
4	Jason Zhang	13.53% (4)	15.59% (4)	14.56%
5	Bibi Zhou	9.23% (5)	19.14% (2) ^{[a]}	14.19%
6	Phil Chang	6.90% (7)	10.30% (6)	8.60%
7	Power Station	7.82% (6)	8.03% (7)	7.93%

A. Has one vote less with 1st place singer

=== Breakout ===
- Taping Date: March 13, 2014
- Airdate: March 21, 2014

The Repechage round was renamed to Breakout rounds, and unlike the first season, where only one Breakout finalist was offered, the number of Breakout finalists was seven minus the number of remaining initial singers, who were automatically exempted from the Breakouts; four singers (Chang, Han, G.E.M. and Zhou) were the initial singers, thus three Breakout finalists were offered.

The other two singers (Shila and Zhang) will participate along previously eliminated singers (with the exception of Luo) for a chance to enter the semi-finals. The singers sang one song, with the three singers having the most votes will qualified for the Semifinals. Shila, Zhang and Chaw were the top three singers (who 30.35%, 22.01% and 19.51% of the votes, respectively) garnered were the top three singers who received the highest number of votes, and advanced to the finals. During the vote count, eight votes were rejected, and it also revealed Shila and Zhang garnered 448 and 325 votes, respectively.

I Am a Singer Season 2 Breakout March 21, 2014 Host: Liao Fan
Order of Performance	Singer	Comedian Manager	Song Title	Original Singer	Lyrics	Composer	Arranger	Ranking
1	Wei Wei	Du Haitao	"重整山河待後生"	駱玉笙	林汝為	雷振邦 溫中甲; Lei Lei	劉嶽	6
2	Gary Chaw	Tian Yuan	"海闊天空"	Beyond	Wong Ka Kui		塗惠源	3
3	Victor Wong	Shen Mengchen	"我最親愛的"	A-mei	Lin Xi	Russell Harris	Kubert Leung	7
4	Power Station	Eliza Liang	"天空"	Faye Wong	黃桂蘭	楊明煌	JerryC	4
5	Jason Zhang	Shen Ling	"你快回來"	Sun Nan	劉沁		Chang Shilei 王之一 趙博	2
6	Man Wenjun	Wang Qiao	"特別的愛給特別的你"	Sky Wu	陳家麗	伍思凱	撈仔	5
6	Man Wenjun	Wang Qiao	"懂你"	Man Wenjun	黃小茂	薛瑞光	撈仔	5
7	Shila Amzah	Jeffrey G	"Rolling In The Deep" (English)	Adele	Adele; Paul Epworth		Kubert Leung	1 ^{[d]}

=== Semifinal ===
- Taping Date: March 20, 2014
- Airdate: March 28, 2014

The semifinals carries a 30% weightage in the final round. Unlike the finals from the last season, the audience could still cast three votes instead of one.

I Am a Singer Season 2 Semifinal March 28, 2014 Host: Hu Haiquan
Order of Performance	Singer	Comedian Manager	Song Title	Original Singer	Lyrics	Composer	Arranger	Ranking
1	Shila Amzah	Jeffrey G	"洋蔥"	Aska Yang; Ding Dang	Ashin		Kubert Leung	6
2	G.E.M.	Lidia	"你不是真正的快樂"	Mayday	Ashin		Lupo Groinig	2
3	Jason Zhang	Shen Ling	"Just the Way You Are" (English)	Bruno Mars			Chang Shilei 王之一	3
4	Han Lei	Li Rui	"在那遙遠的地方"	Kazakhs folk song Karen Mok	Wang Luobin		小外	1
5	Bibi Zhou	Oscar Sun	"光之翼"	Faye Wong	Jozev	Kubert Leung	Pyo Keun Soo	5
6	Gary Chaw	Tian Yuan	"Saving All My Love for You" (English)	Whitney Houston	Michael Masser; Gerry Goffin		塗惠源	4
7	Phil Chang	YOYO	"20歲的眼淚"	Bobby Chen			Kubert Leung	7

=== Finals ===
- Airdate: April 4, 2013

The finals was divided into two rounds, with the first song being a duet with a guest singer, and the second song being a solo encore performance. The weightages for both rounds were 30% and 40%, respectively; the singer accumulating the highest total combining from the three rounds was the winner.

==== 1st round ====
The first round of the finals was a guest singer's duet, which carries a 30% weightage of the final round scores. The order of performance of this round is determined by the singer who place first in the Semifinals. This round features double elimination; the two singers who received the two lowest votes combined from this round were eliminated.

I Am a Singer Season 2 Grand Finals Round 1 April 4, 2014 Host: He Jiong, Wang Han
Order of Performance	Singer	Comedian Manager	Help Singer	Song Title	Original Singer	Lyrics	Composer	Arranger	Ranking
1	Gary Chaw	Tian Yuan	Sitar Tan	"What's Up" (English)	4 Non Blondes	Linda Perry		塗惠源	4
2	Bibi Zhou	Oscar Sun	Shin	"一樣的月光"	Su Rui; Angel Lee	Wu Nien Jen; Lo Ta Yu	Lee Shou-chuan	陳磊	—
3	Jason Zhang	Shen Ling	JJ Lin	"最美的太陽"	Jason Zhang	劉迦寧		曲世聰	5
3	Jason Zhang	Shen Ling	JJ Lin	"翅膀"	JJ Lin	張思爾	JJ Lin	曲世聰	5
4	Han Lei	Li Rui	Zhang Jia Yi; Hu Yanbin	"掀起你的蓋頭來"	Xinjiang folk song	Wang Luobin		張朝	1
5	Phil Chang	YOYO	Julian Chen	"傷心的人別聽慢歌"	Mayday	Ashin		呂紹淳	—
5	Phil Chang	YOYO	Julian Chen	"舞孃"	Jolin Tsai	陳鎮川	Miriam Nervo; Liv Nervo; Grag Kursten	呂紹淳	—
6	Shila Amzah	Jeffrey G	Huang Qishan	"When You Believe" (English)	Whitney Houston; Mariah Carey	Tephen Schwartz		Kubert Leung	3
7	G.E.M.	Lidia	Khalil Fong	"春天裡"	Wang Feng			Lupo Groinig; Doug Petty	2

Had Bibi Zhou and Phil Chang advanced to the next round, they would've performed "The Offering to Love" (爱的供养) and "Four Hundred Dollars" (四百龙银) as their encore songs, respectively.

==== 2nd round ====
The second round of the finals is an encore song, which carries a 40% weightage of the final round scores. The order of performance of this round is determined by the singer who place first in the first song.

I Am a Singer Season 2 Grand Finals Round 2 April 4, 2014 Host: He Jiong, Wang Han
Order of Performance	Singer	Comedian Manager	Song Title	Original Singer	Lyrics	Composer	Arranger	Ranking
1	Jason Zhang	Shen Ling	"回到拉薩"	Zheng Jun			Chang Shilei 王之一	—
2	Gary Chaw	Tian Yuan	"寂寞先生"	Gary Chaw	Xiaohan	Cao Ge	塗惠源	—
3	Shila Amzah	Jeffrey G	"MAMA"	EXO-M	王雅君	Yoo/Young Jin	Kubert Leung	—
4	G.E.M.	Lidia	"We Will Rock You" (English)	Queen	Brian May		Lupo Groinig	2
4	G.E.M.	Lidia	"一無所有"	Cui Jian			Lupo Groinig	2
4	G.E.M.	Lidia	"We Are The Champions" (English)	Queen	Freddie Mercury		Lupo Groinig	2
5	Han Lei	Li Rui	"鴻雁"	呼斯楞	呂燕衛	張宏光	張朝	1
5	Han Lei	Li Rui	"走四方"	Han Lei	李海鷹		張朝	1
5	Han Lei	Li Rui	"向天再借五百年"	Han Lei	樊孝斌	張宏光	張朝	1

==== Winner of Battle ====
Before the final results are announced, the host named G.E.M. and Han Lei as "Ultimate Winner Candidates". Han was declared the winner with 28.31% of the combined total, beating G.E.M.'s combined total of 24.95%.

I Am a Singer Season 2 Winner of Battle
Ranking	Singer	Semi Finals Percentages of Votes (30%)	Grand Finals Round 1 Percentages of Votes (30%)	Grand Finals Round 2 Percentages of Votes (40%)	Total Percentages of Votes
1	Han Lei	25.71%	19.37%	36.96%	28.31%
2	G.E.M.	19.43%	18.77%	33.73%	24.95%

=== Biennial concert ===
- Airdate: April 11, 2014

The concert consisted of ten singers from the first two series, which included the top five finalists, as well season 1's singers Yu Quan, Terry Lin, Aska Yang, Julia Peng and Shang Wenjie.

I Am a Singer Season 2 Biennial Concert April 11, 2014 Host: Hu Haiquan
Group of Performance	Order of Performance	Singer	Song Title	Original Singer	Lyrics	Composer	Arranger
I	1	Han Lei	"味道"	Winnie Hsin	Yao Chien	Huang Kuo Lun	屠穎
I	2	Terry Lin	"瞬間永恆"	Terry Lin	樓南蔚	李王若涵	薛位山 陳依婷; Cosine
I	2	Terry Lin	"I Can Wait Forever" (English)	Air Supply	Graham Russell; David Foster; Jay Graydon		薛位山 陳依婷; Cosine
II	3	Julia Peng	"鹿港小镇"	Lo Ta Yu			Kubert Leung
II	4	Gary Chaw	"剪愛"	A-mei	Eric Lin	塗惠源	
II	4	Gary Chaw	"听海"	A-mei	Eric Lin	塗惠源	
III	5	Shila Amzah	"唯一"	Wang Leehom			Kubert Leung
III	6	Aska Yang	"底細"	Aska Yang	Jonathan Lee	李劍青	Mac Chew
IV	7	Shang Wenjie	"Empire State Of Mind" (English)	Alicia Keys	Jay Z	Angela Hunte; Jane't"Jnay"Sewell Ulepic	孔瀟一
IV	8	Jason Zhang	"他不懂"	Jason Zhang	代嶽東 周振霆	唐湘智	謳歌
V	9	G.E.M.	"Imagine" (English)	John Lennon			Lupo Groinig
V	10	Yu Quan	"走四方"	Han Lei	李海鷹		Yu Quan 劉卓
