= Wei Wei (singer) =

Chinese female singer

Professor Wei Wei
- 韦唯
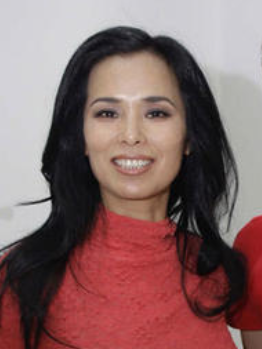
- Wei in 2011

Standing Committee Member of the All-China Youth Federation
- In office 2005–2010
- President: Zhao Yong
- Vice President: Peng Liyuan

Ambassador of the Chinese Football Association
- In office 2008–2009
- President: Yuan Weimin

Ambassador of Forestry of the National Forestry and Grassland Administration
- In office 2009–2010
- Minister: Jia Zhibang

Personal details
- Born: 28 September 1963 (age 63) Hohhot, Inner Mongolia, China
- Spouse: Michael Joseph Smith (1995–2004)
- Children: Symington W. Smith, Remington W. Smith, Vinson W. Smith
- Education: Central Conservatory of Music
- Occupation: Singer; mezzo-soprano; professor
- Awards: 24th Sopot International Song Festival Winner & Miss Photo Category Winner (1987); Honorary Doctorate, East China University of Political Science and Law (2009); Golden Phoenix Award (2008); 1st Level National Professional Qualification Certificate (1986)

Wei Wei (simplified Chinese: 韦唯; traditional Chinese: 韋唯; pinyin: Wéi Wéi; born 28 September 1963) is a Chinese singer, actress, philanthropist and professor. Nicknamed "The Empress of Pop", she has been widely recognized for her artistry and vocal performances. She has been regarded as one of the greatest Chinese entertainers of her generation, and her contributions to music and visual media have made her a prominent and influential Chinese pop culture figure during the 1990s and early 2000s.

Wei started performing in various state-sponsored singing and dancing competitions as a child, singing state-sanctioned revolutionary music. Her breakthrough came alongside the reform and opening up in 1986 when she won both the National Young Singers contest in China, and the 24th Sopot International Song Festival in Poland. Four years later, she performed a duet with Spanish singer Julio Iglesias at the 1993 East Asian Games in Shanghai.

Largely associated with sports culture and the Olympics, Wei has been an Olympic Cultural Ambassador for China since 1993, a role she assumed when the Chinese Olympic Committee submitted its initial application to host the Olympic Games. Wei was the sole cultural representative for Asia at the 1996 Summer Olympics, and has performed at several major events, including the opening ceremony of Expo 2010, the closing ceremony of the 2008 Summer Olympics, and the opening and closing ceremonies of the 11th National Games of China.

Wei's songs have been used as the official theme songs for many major sporting events in China. Her single "I Want to Fly" was chosen by the Chinese Olympic Committee as the official theme song for the 2008 Olympic Sailing events. In 2007, The All-China Women's Federation recognized Wei's contributions to Chinese sports culture by designating her the "Queen of Sports".

Having sold an estimated 100-200 million records worldwide, Wei is one of Asia's best-selling recording artists. Considered a "national treasure" in China, Wei is the first Mainland Chinese pop singer to have competed abroad representing the People's Republic of China, the first Zhuang ethnic minority artist to represent China internationally, the first woman to be selected as China's Olympic Cultural Ambassador, and one of China's earliest artists to use the internet for the digital release of music. The haute-couture dress designed for Wei by Lars Wallin for the '08 Olympics is on permanent display at the Nordic Museum in Sweden.

== Early life ==
Wei was born to a Zhuang family in Hohhot, Inner Mongolia to Zhang Yu, a People's Liberation Army veteran and railway official, and Wei Xiuqun. While in kindergarten, she began practicing the performing arts. When she was 7 years old, her family moved to Liuzhou in Guangxi, and at the age of 14, she moved to Beijing and started to work for the China National Song & Dance Ensemble. As a young unit member her education included dancing, singing, playing instruments, choreography, stage design, and lighting. The unit traveled throughout China, often doing several live performances in one day. She finished her education at the Central Conservatory of Music in Beijing, China.

== Career ==
=== 1986–1987: Breakthrough and National Qualification ===
In 1986, Wei won the National Young Singers contest on Chinese television with the song Wanna Take One More Chance to Look at You. In 1987, she won the 24th Sopot International Music Festival in Poland as China's first representative to an international pop competition. In 1986 at the age of 20 she was awarded a "2nd Level National Performer Professional Qualification Certificate" by the Ministry of Culture of the People's Republic of China. A year after, the ministry awarded her with a "1st Level National Performer Professional Qualification Certificate", the highest professional qualification of her field in China, equal to a Professional Doctorate, and which enabled her to teach at professor level in music academies in China.

=== 1988–1992: Dedication of Love and Rise to Stardom ===
In 1988, Wei sang the theme song for China Central Television's New Year's Gala, Gathering of the Year of the Dragon. In 1989, her rendition of the Chinese song Dedication of Love - a performance credited with truly starting her career– became a national hit in China, and she became a symbol for charity and fund-raising activities as her performance had raised enough funds to help a rural migrant worker from Anhui to recover from spinal surgery. In the same year, her song Today is Your Birthday won the gold medal at the Jian Brand Cup and Beijing Radio Song Competition, and has since been used as a theme song to celebrate China's National Day. In 1990, her new single Asian Mighty Winds was selected as the theme of the 1990 Asian Games, and she performed it alongside Chinese singer Liu Huan. The song quickly became another national hit, and Wei was dubbed the "Queen of Sports" by the Provincial Government of Guangxi, Liuzhou. That same year, she starred in the film The Story of A Songstress alongside Chinese actor Zhang Guoli and Jiang Lili; and performed at the Miss Asia Pageant show in Hong Kong in 1992, also becoming the lead singer in the first concert tour in American major cities arranged by the China Central Song and Dance Group.

=== 1993–2000: Carnegie Hall and International Recognition ===
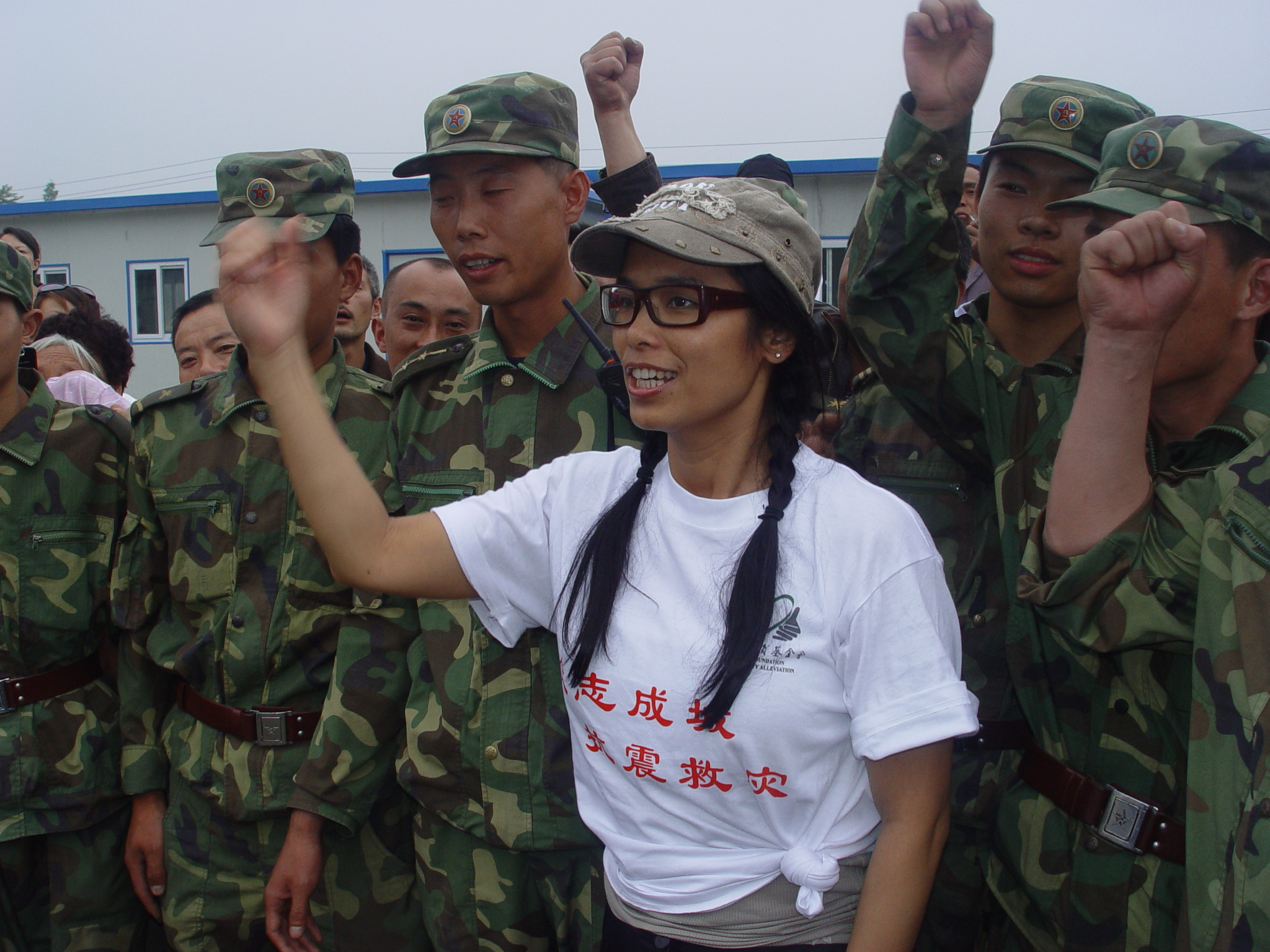
Wei with first-responders of the People's Liberation Army during the 2008 Sichuan Earthquake

In 1993, Wei was the lead singer at the 1993 East Asian Games opening and closing ceremonies together with Spanish singer Julio Iglesias. She then performed her single Asian Mighty Winds again at the 1994 Asian Games opening show in Hiroshima, Japan, and the lyrics of her songs became the subject of academic discourse and analysis in Japan. Later that year, Wei was one of only two singers chosen to join a 200-member Olympic delegation visiting Monaco to campaign for the Beijing Summer Olympic Games bid. A year after, in 1994, she was named Star of the Night after her performance of her hit single Dedication of Love at the CCTV New Year's Gala in Carnegie Hall, New York. In the same year, the song Wind Coming From the East became a hit at a show in Shanghai Oriental TV, and subsequently became the TV station's theme song. Her first English album was released, titled The Twilight.

After her performance at Carnegie Hall, she started her concert tour "Wei Wei and the World", which included visits and performances in the major cities in mainland China, including Beijing, Shanghai, Guangzhou, and Kunming.

Billy Payne, president and CEO of the Atlanta Committee for the Olympic Games confirmed Wei as Asia's sole cultural representative to the Olympics after meeting in 1996. Wei performed in front a 60,000 crowd alongside James Brown, Willie Nelson, Travis Tritt, Trisha Yearwood as a Cultural Olympiad performer at Centennial Olympic Park in Atlanta in 1996. For being Asia's sole cultural representative to the games, Wei was interviewed in a CNN fifteen-minute special. The year after in 1997, Wei entered into a one-year endorsement agreement with American hair care company Nioxin, becoming its product ambassador in China, Taiwan and Hong Kong. In 1999, Wei's compilation album Wei Wei's Devotion was the most popular pop music album in China, and she held a concert at Caesar's Palace in Paris, France to further promote the album. In 2000, she joined the Chinese Olympic Committee and represented the People's Republic of China in campaigning for the Beijing 2008 Summer Olympics, and performing with the Sydney Opera and Shanghai Opera. Her rendition of The Same Song won her a Golden Phoenix Prize at the 6th China Music Television Competition.

=== 2000–2014: Go, Girl Go!, The 2008 Beijing Olympics & I Am A Singer ===
In 2003, Wei was invited as a special guest at galas arranged in Beijing in the honor of healthcare staff after the SARS epidemic, and initiated an international management company, Wei Wei International Management, in Stockholm for the purpose of further developing her international career. In 2004, she continued her performances for Olympic and sports related events, and inaugurated the construction start of the new Beijing National Stadium. During this time, she was also the main performer at the opening ceremony show for the Formula 1 Racetrack in Shanghai. At a show for the international unveiling of China's Olympic slogan "One World, One Dream", she performed Andrew Lloyd Webber's song Love Changes Everything. In a 2004 online survey about who should sing the theme song for the Chinese Olympics, Wei emerged as the most voted candidate.

From 2005 to 2010, Wei served as a Standing Committee Member of the All-China Youth Federation.

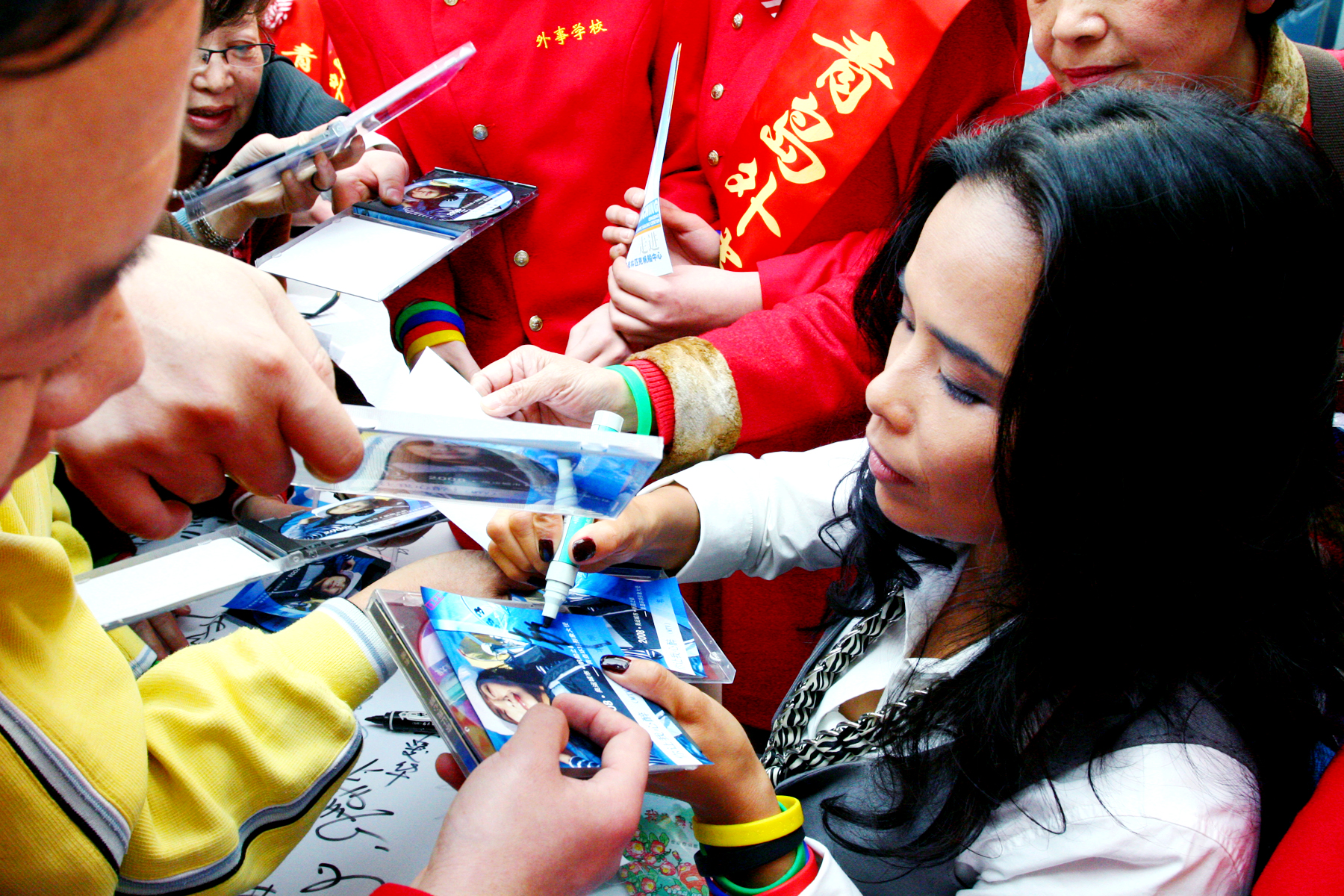
Wei signing autographs after accepting her appointment as Ambassador of Qingdao Olympic Sailing in 2007

In 2006, she celebrated twenty years on stage with the publication of her biography The New Wei, My New Way, written by Swedish author Catarina Lilliehöök. She also released twenty new recordings of her 20 greatest hits. The first one, a medley that consists of parts of her five greatest hits, was launched on 8 May: the 20X20 Dance Loop. She also released worldwide on digital download distributor iTunes Music Store, and commenced an international tour for the celebration of the Chinese New Year, which included performances in Los Angeles, Vienna, Barcelona, and Roger's Center in Toronto, where she was welcomed by China's Ambassador to Canada, Lu Shumin and Consulate General of Toronto Chen Xiaoling. During this time, she also served as a judge on China's largest singing competition, The National Young Singers Grand Awards, and performed the Olympic theme song One World, One Dream at an Olympic Show at the Great Wall together with Olympic athletes.

In 2007, she was appointed Ambassador for the Chinese Football Association, and her single Go, Girl Go! was appointed the official theme song of the 2007 FIFA Women's World Cup. FC Barcelona players Carles Puyol, Lionel Messi, Deco and others joined Wei in the Go, Girl Go! music video as a salute to women's football players.

Throughout 2008, she performed as part of the Fairchild Media Group, and Shanghai Media Group's Chinese New Year All Star Show '08. The show was filmed in Vancouver, British Columbia, Canada, on 18 January, and included a duet from Wei and classical-crossover soprano Giorgia Fumanti. Wei also performed at Swedish show Allsång på Skansen with host Anders Lundin. As the year drew to a close, she was appointed a Musical Ambassador for the Beijing 2008 Olympics, and was a panelist at the "Champions of Change" hosted London Development Agency and moderated by Jaime FlorCruz, speaking alongside then Mayor of London Boris Johnson, Sebastian Coe, and others at the London House's Shi Cha Hai Club in Beijing. She collaborated with BoA, Ruth Sahanaya, Despina Vandi, Sonu, Daniela Mercury and others to remix her original hit song Dedication of Love in English.

At closing ceremony of the 2008 Summer Olympics, Wei performed Surpass alongside Chinese singer Sun Nan, and then assumed her position as China's Forestry Ambassador to the United Nations of the National Forestry and Grassland Administration from 2009 to 2010.

In 2014, Wei competed in I Am a Singer (Chinese season 2) alongside Phil Chang, Gary Chaw, G.E.M., Han Lei and others.

=== The 2022 Winter Olympics & The 2022 Asian Games ===
In 2022, Wei reappeared after an 8-year hiatus as one of the lead singers for the 2022 Winter Olympics' theme song "Together for the Future". On 18 February 2022, Wei's online encouragement of her eldest son Symington to "learn from" Olympic skier Eileen Gu became a trending topic on Weibo and made headlines in the Chinese press. The same year, she was appointed visiting professor of music and a doctoral advisor specializing in vocal music at Shinawatra University, a private international university in Thailand established by former Prime Minister of Thailand, Thaksin Shinawatra.

=== 2023–2024: Return to China - Theatre, Fashion & Entrepreneurship ===
Wei returned to China in 2023 and made her first debut into musical theatre, performing as a lead actress in musical Ghetto, created and directed by Israeli artist Joshua Sober and premiering in Harbin city. On 24 November 2023, Wei walked the red carpet at Elle China's 35th Anniversary Gala, and received the 2023 Elle Style Award. In 2024, Wei chaired the 2024 Yale Sinovation Forum at the Yale Center Beijing, promoting and discussing the role of women in entrepreneurship, and performed at China's Strawberry Music Festival, with a lineup including American indie pop band The Drums and Chinese singers Zhao Lei and Wowkie Zhang.

== Charity work ==
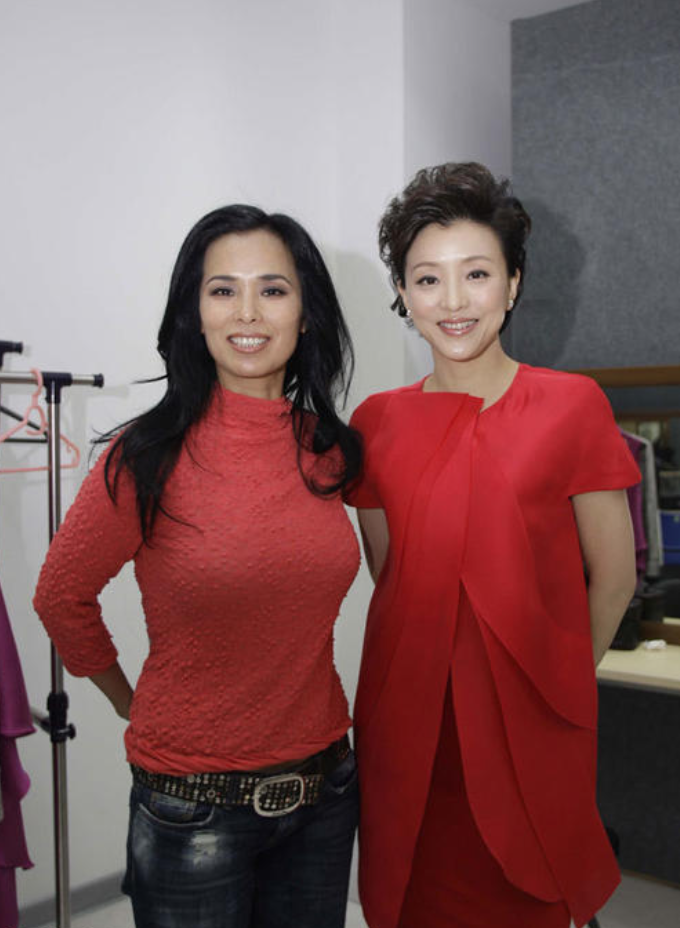
Wei with Yang Lan, 2011

Throughout her career, Wei has performed at a variety of charity shows. In 1991, she performed her song Dedication of Love at a charity fundraising show in China for victims of the 1998 China floods at the Great Hall of the People in Beijing. In 2004 she performed Dedication of Love together with Yang Haito, a blind Chinese artist, at a charity ball for the handicapped hosted by Deng Pufang, son of the former Chinese leader Deng Xiaoping. In 2005 she performed at the charity show "The Happiness Project" for mothers in Shenzhen, China.

In 2012, she attended a charity auction in Beijing alongside her three children to auction a dress she wore during her performance at the 2008 Beijing Olympics. It sold for a record CNY ¥300,000 (US$42,800), and all proceeds were donated to charity. In the same year, she was also appointed China's Oceanic Goodwill Ambassador by the China's Ministry of Natural Resources.

In 2013, to raise funds for cancer research and to spread awareness for cancer patients, she performed Dedication of Love at the 15th Beijing Hope Run & Dash held in Chaoyang Park, Beijing to an audience of over 5585 people, for which she was awarded a world record for "the most number of people who sang Dedication of Love using sign language at the same time in the world" by the World Record Association of Hong Kong.

== Personal life ==
Wei married American composer Michael Joseph Smith in 1995, and the couple had three children, Symington W. Smith, Remington W. Smith & Vinson W. Smith. They divorced in 2005, and she moved with her children from Stockholm, Sweden to Beijing, China.

Wei has been a long-time friend of Hong Kong actor Jackie Chan, who appeared with her and her children at a charity event in Beijing, and Chinese-Singaporean actress Gong Li, who in pictures released by Xinhua News Agency in 2014 showed Gong embracing Wei's eldest son, Symington, at Wei's home in Beijing.

In December 2009, Swedish tax authorities accused Wei of owing an estimated SEK 80–104 million Swedish kronor (approximately US$10 million) in taxes to the Swedish government for incomes earned in China during the years 2003–2008. In response, she released a public letter addressed to then-Prime Minister of Sweden, Fredrik Reinfeld, asking for help and arguing that the tax authorities had illegally confiscated her assets because the tax authorities had proceeded with confiscation without a warrant or court order. The Swedish tax authority's accusations were ultimately rejected by Swedish courts due to a lack of concrete facts.

== Legacy ==
Wei is largely considered a national treasure in China, and one of its most iconic singers. Wei is the first Mainland Chinese pop singer after the reform and opening up period initiated under Deng Xiaoping to have competed abroad officially representing the People's Republic of China, the first Zhuang ethnic minority artist to represent China internationally, the first woman to be selected as China's Olympic Ambassador, and one of China's earliest artists to use the internet for the digital release of music. Winne Chung wrote for the South China Morning Post, "Wei Wei is China's biggest pop star and its most attractive ambassador." Kristoger Stenneberg wrote for DiEgo, a Swedish magazine that " Wei has a dark, almost masculine voice when speaking which suddenly becomes absent when singing. Her voice is a blend between Kylie Minogue and Ann Sofie von Otter", also remarking that "In China, the military stands double file to hold back her screaming fans."

Writing for Open Magazine, Hong Kong journalist Huang Baolian remarked that "This unpretentious woman is China's radiant superstar, and everyone in China knows it. She's rightly regarded by her government as a national treasure." Commenting on Wei's duet with Julio Iglesias at the East Asian Games, Swedish journalist Per Nillson wrote in Expressen "The high point for the jubilant masses was when Iglesias tried to sing in Chinese - a language he learnt from Wei, who also credits him with being a great student." Interviewing Wei for Svenska Dagbladet, journalist Adam Svanell described her as an "unwilling superstar who never dreamed of being a popstar" and a "most secret world artist". Maria Roswall of Svensk Damtidning wrote Wei is "...an immensely large star in China".

In the Swedish media, Wei has been routinely referred to as "China's Madonna". Musically, not so much but career-wise, yes. Both broke through in the 80s, have managed to maintain their popularity and sold a total of over 200 million full-length records. When she compares herself to Michael Jackson during our interview, I laugh a little, until it strikes me that it's a perfectly reasonable parallel. — Adam Svanell, Motvillig Stjärna, Svenska Dagbladet

In 2015, she was awarded an honorary doctorate from the East China University of Political Science and Law and appointed Honorary Dean, and she holds a world record for the largest number of people to perform a sing-along using sign language. She has sold an estimated 100-200 million records, making her one of the best-selling Mainland Chinese artist during the 1990s, and leading her to be referred to as "China's Whitney Houston", and "China's Madonna".

== Discography ==
- The Album (1986)
- Bright Eyes (1987)
- The Four Points of Love (1988)
- Endless Love 无限的爱 (1989)
- I Love My Motherland 我爱我的祖国 (1990)
- Famous Songs (1992)
- The Twilight (1994)
- Wei Wei 韦唯 (1998)
- Wei Wei's Devotion (1999)
- Dedication of Love 爱的奉献 (2001)
- Myths of China 中国的神话 (2005)
- Yang Chin (2006)
- 20x20 (2008)

== Filmography ==
- The Story of a Star 女歌星的故事 (1991)
