= Compass (band) =

Chinese musical group

Cover of Xuanze jianqiang showing singer Luo Qi in the centre of the original band members

Zhinanzhen (指南针乐队 The Compass) are a Chinese rock band formed in Sichuan in 1990, coming to Beijing in 1991. The band's original lineup was singer Luo Qi, with guitarist Zhou Di, Keyboardist Guo Liang, drummer Zheng Chaozhen, and saxophonist Yuan Ding. Luo Qi parted ways with the band, going solo then leaving China for Germany for six years.

For the album Wufa taotuo the six-man line up was singer Liu Zhēngróng, bass Yue Haokun, and the four original members: guitarist Zhou Di, Keyboardist Guo Liang, drummer Zheng Chaozhen, and saxophonist Yuan Ding.

== Albums ==
- 1993 Xuanze jianqiang 选择坚强 with Luo Qi
- 1997 Wufa taotuo (无法逃脱)
