= Lin Chia Ching =

Lin Chia Ching 林家慶
- Born: April 17, 1934 (age 92); Taiwan
- Occupations: Musician, television music program producer

Lin Chia Ching (Mandarin: 林家慶)(born April 17, 1934) is a Taiwanese musician, television music program producer, retired employee of China Television Company (CTV), lyricist, composer, arranger, conductor, former conductor and leader of the CTV Orchestra.

== Biography ==
Lin Chia Ching graduated from the Department of Mechanical Engineering of Taipei Technical College (now the Department of Mechanical Engineering of National Taipei University of Technology). While studying at TIT, Lin Chia Ching became passionate about music, initially studying saxophone, and most interested in arranging and composing music, so he used his spare time to buy some music books to study arranging and composing music. Before graduating from the Taipei Technical College, Lin Chia Ching used his spare time to perform in western restaurants in Taipei City, where he also made guest appearances as an arranger. After graduating from TIT, he was sent to Taiwan Power Company (TEPCO) to work as an engineer at the Shenao Thermal Power Plant, where he also worked as an arranger for some record labels, and in 1953, Lin Chia Ching was invited by musician Hsieh Teng Hui (Mandarin: 謝騰輝) to join the Drum Bass Band (Mandarin: 鼓霸大樂隊), At that time, he spent 90 minutes walking from the Shenao Thermal Power Plant to Batouzi every day, catching a bus to Keelung City Center, then transferring to Taipei City to join the band's performance, and then hurrying to the Shenao Thermal Power Plant in the early morning to go to work the next day. As the number of arrangements increased, Lin Chia Ching resigned from TEPCO to concentrate on arranging and composing, and also worked as a bandleader at the National Hotel Night Club. In 1969, he was recruited to organize the CTV Big Band for the newly launched CTV. In April 1970, the CTV Big Band was officially formed, with Lin Chia-ching as the conductor and leader of the CTV Big Band.

In addition to being the conductor and leader of the CTV Big Band, Lin Chia-ching has produced a number of CTV music programs such as "The Five-Line Spectrum"(Mandarin: 五線譜), "The Golden Five-Line Spectrum"(Mandarin: 黃金五線譜), "Flying Notes"(Mandarin: 飛揚的音符), and "Music from the Heart"(Mandarin: 樂自心中來), and has also composed pop songs, and has been involved in record production and arranging, and was well known for her refreshingly simple and elegant style of arranging between the 1960s and 1970s. In 1975, the theme song for the Taiwan film On the Waterfront (Mandarin: 在水一方) – "On the Waterfront", sung by Jiang Lei (Mandarin: 江蕾), with lyrics by Chiung Yao, and composed by Lin Chia-ching – was released. Many people covered the song in the years to come, including Teresa Teng and Lee Pik Wah (Mandarin: 李碧華).

In January 1980, Lin Chia-ching mentioned his reasons for focusing on writing pop songs: "On the one hand, I love music; on the other hand, I thought it was bad enough, and if no one else was doing it, it would be even more hopeless," he said," in an industrial and commercial society, most people's mental stimulation comes from television, and the entertainment provided by variety and singing programs accounts for a large proportion of the entertainment, so songs sung on television have an absolute impact on the public, and the promotion of popular, healthy and elegant songs is necessary, "We have to let the audience feel that there is still some significance in the viewing experience. He also disagrees with the view that "we already have a lot of songs now, so we don't need to create new ones" or "we need to create songs for the audience a hundred years from now", he says: "The old school and the idealist are both wrong. The former is conservative and retains only the past; the latter is dreamy and sees only a distant future; both are unsound thinking. He is proud to say that he has never composed vulgar songs, and that the characteristics of "elegant, living, popular but not vulgar" emphasized by CTV in composing the songs this time are his self-requirements.

In May 1981, Lin Chia-ching mentioned his journey of composing children's songs: "The Adventures of Little Gua-du" (Mandarin: 小瓜呆歷險記), the Theme Song of "Little Gua-du"(Mandarin: 小瓜呆), the naive and pitiful muppet in CCTV's children's program "Pei Pei Theater" (Mandarin: 貝貝劇場), was the first children's song he composed, and also one of his favorites. He said that when creating a cartoon song, he would first understand the background of the story, the personality of the protagonist and then create: for example, science fiction cartoons such as "Gatchaman" and "Triton of the Sea" are more suitable for elementary school audiences, so the theme song has a higher pitch, fast melody and the flavor of a pop song; "Nobody's Boy: Remi" is an ethical cartoon, which is more suitable for elementary school audiences, so the theme song has a slow tempo with a strong humanistic flavor. The theme song has a slow tempo and contains a strong human flavor.

In December 1982, Lin Chia-ching said about members of the TTV Big Band, CTV Big Band, and CTV Big Band playing at major restaurants on a part-time basis every night, "The bands work an average of ten hours a day at the TV station, and in addition to playing on Variety shows, they also have to do a lot of work such as recording, and discussing musical performances with the producers; on a part-time basis in the evenings, they only need to work for three hours, With such a ratio, of course, many people will be able to make an income of 40,000 to 50,000 RMB a month. With this kind of ratio, of course many people will take part-time jobs outside." On the subject of lip-synching, Lin Chia-ching said, "TV bands are different from record label bands. Record bands have winds, strings, and in some cases violins, so even if you lip-synch on TV, it's not realistic – the picture doesn't match the sound, and the flavor is completely different. So we hope that singers will sing live if they want to sing, and that production units should focus on musicality and not just entertainment."

On March 22, 1986, the 21st Golden Bell Awards ceremony, the presenters of the TV Golden Bell Awards for Variety Show Hosts were Li-Sheng Hsieh (Mandarin: 謝荔生), conductor of the TTV Big Band, Lin Chia-ching, conductor of the CTV Big Band, Zhan Sen-Xiong (Mandarin: 詹森雄), conductor of the CCTV Big Band, and Gu Feng-Yu (Mandarin: 顧豐毓), conductor of the CVB Orchestra.

On March 5, 1994, Lin Chia-ching sang the Japanese song "Love You to the Bone" (Mandarin: 愛你入骨)and was interviewed by the host of the CCTV variety show "Banana New Paradise"(Mandarin: 香蕉新樂園) in the oldies segment "Banana Ballads" (Mandarin: 香蕉歌謠), the first time Lin Chia-ching had sung on television. In June 1997, Lin Chia-ching was a judge on the CTV variety show Champion Family TV Show.

In 1998, Lin Chia-ching retired and CTV demobilized the CTV Big Band with a severance package of NT$24 million. In 2002, Lin Chia-ching emigrated to Canada. On June 10, 2006, Lin Chia-ching received the Special Contribution Award at the 17th Golden Melody Awards. When receiving the award, he said, "I'm glad that everyone hasn't forgotten me", thanked his family for their support, and also said, "I'd like to thank the CTV orchestra that I used to work with, at least our efforts have left a brilliant record in Taiwan's television history" Lin Chia-ching still continues to create music. ching continues to create music, volunteering to compose children's music for the Taipei Music Education Association.

In March 2007, Lin Chia-ching brought back her old bandmates from the CTV Big Band to form the Lin Chia-ching Big Band to play Taiwanese folk music with jazz music. On December 19, 2007, Lin Chia-ching reorganized the Lin Chia-ching Orchestra into the Ai Yuet Orchestra (Mandarin: 愛悅大樂團) by adding young musicians to the orchestra. On May 23, 2010, the 63rd episode of the Taiwan Public Television 's music program "Music for All Ages" (Mandarin: 音樂萬萬歲) featured Lin Chia-ching for the first time after his retirement from the music industry

== Works ==
Production

- CTV's "Five Line Spectrum" (started on December 10, 1974, stopped on April 27, 1975)
- CTV's "Golden Spectrum" (hosted by Zhang Hongyi, started on November 8, 1986, stopped on August 9, 1987)
- CTV's "Flying Notes" (produced by Lin Chia Ching and Bai Guojia, hosted by Li Fengyi)
- CTV's "Fragrance of the Night" (produced by Lin Chia Ching and Paik Guojia, hosted by Zhao Ning, launched on October 17, 1990, discontinued on December 26, 1990)
- CTV's "Music from the Heart" (started on April 2, 1991, stopped on October 2, 1997)

== See also ==
- Lin Chia-ching Big Band
- Lin Chia-ching Big Band on Facebook
- Lin Chia-ching at IMDb
- Lin Chia-ching at the Hong Kong Movie Database
