= Jason Zhang =

- 张杰
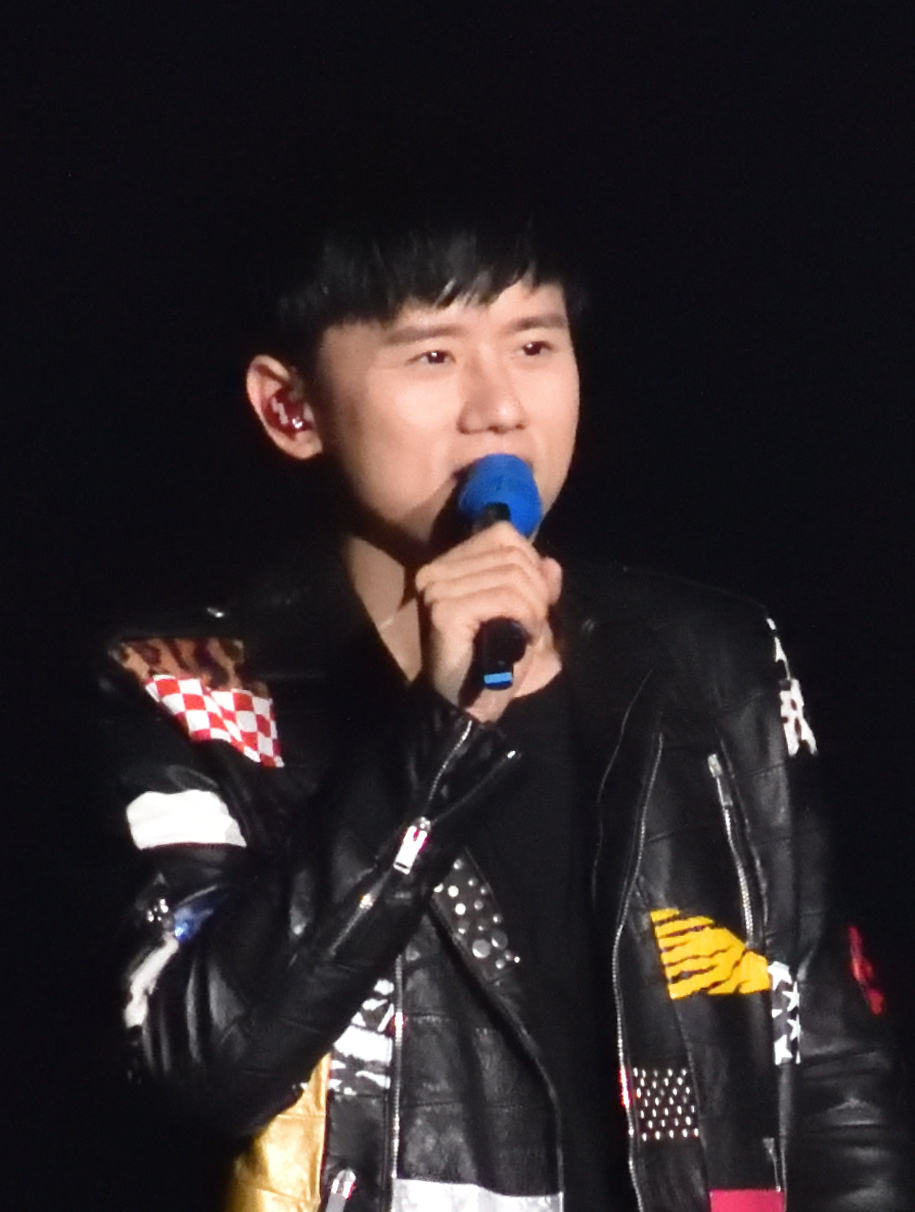
- Zhang in November 2016, Sound of My Heart Concert in Wuhan
- Born: Zhang Jie; 20 December 1982 (age 43); Chengdu, Sichuan, China
- Education: Sichuan Normal University
- Occupations: Singer, Producer, Songwriter
- Years active: 2004–present
- Height: 1.80 m (5 ft 11 in)
- Spouse: Xie Na (m. 2011)
- Children: 3
- Awards: MAMA Best Asian Artist (2010); AMA Best International Artist (2014)

Chinese name
- Traditional Chinese: 張杰
- Simplified Chinese: 张杰
Transcriptions
Standard Mandarin
- Hanyu Pinyin: Zhāng Jié
- Musical career
- Origin: Chengdu, China
- Genre: Mandopop
- Labels: Universal Music; EE-Media; Planet Culture

Zhang Jie (Chinese: 张杰; pinyin: Zhāng Jié; born 20 December 1982), also known as Jason Zhang, is a Chinese singer, producer, and songwriter. He gained national recognition through two television singing competitions, winning My Style and My Show in 2004 and ranking 4th on Super Boy in 2007. In 2016, he founded his own music label, Planet Culture.

== Biography ==
=== 1982–2003: Early life ===
Zhang was born on 20 December 1982, in Chengdu, Sichuan. He enrolled at Sichuan Normal University in 2000, where he studied Hospitality and Tourism while performing as a resident singer at local venues to support himself financially. In 2003, he took part in the MTV-Samsung Anycall National Singing Competition and won second place.

=== 2004–2006: Debut and Sum Entertainment (Universal Music China) ===
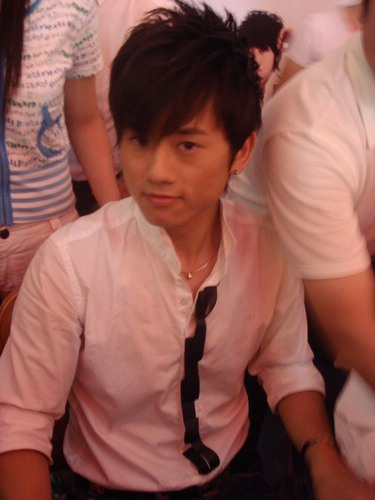
Zhang in 2007

In 2004, Zhang gained national recognition after winning the first season of the television singing competition My Style and My Show (我型我秀), where he performed the original song Love of the Big Dipper (北斗星的爱) in the final. Following the competition, he signed a six-year contract with Sum Entertainment.

In 2005, he released his debut studio album The First Album (第一张) and received several honors including the Most Popular Newcomer Award at the Global Chinese Music Chart and the Best New Male Singer Gold Award at the TVB8 Awards. His second album, Love Me Again (再爱我一回), followed in 2006. Changes in management at his record label affected the continuity of his early career, leading Zhang to issue an unilateral letter of termination to Sum Entertainment.

=== 2007–2015: EE-Media ===
In May 2007, Zhang entered another singing competition show, Super Boy, and finished in fourth place. However, his action triggered a contractual conflict with Sum Entertainment, whose contract with Zhang was still active. Sum Entertainment then filed a lawsuit against Zhang for breach of contract. The court ruled that Zhang violated his contract with Sum Entertainment and ordered him to pay a fine of 500,000 yuan. Following the lawsuit, Zhang reached an agreement with Sum Entertainment to pay a terminate fee of 1,250,000 yuan to end his contract, bringing his total payment to Sum Entertainment to 1,750,000 yuan. Of the 1,750,000 yuan, Zhang paid 350,000 yuan and the remaining 1,400,000 yuan was raised by his fans. Zhang promised to hold two free concerts in return.

After, Zhang signed with EE-Media, marking a turning point in his career. Zhang participated in the Super Boy national tour, winning the City Star award in Chengdu, Nanjing, Hangzhou, and Chongqing, and gained significant popularity. In December 2007, Zhang released the EP The Most Beautiful Sun (最美的太阳), which reached multiple year-end sales milestones on Amazon China.

In 2008, Zhang held his first solo concert at the Beijing Exhibition Center. Due to high demand, additional standing tickets were released. The success led to a second concert held at Hangzhou Gymnasium. In October, he released the album The Day After Tomorrow (明天过后), which received the Album of the Year award at the 4th BQ Celebrity Score Awards, Mainland Most Popular Male Singer Award at the 6th Southeast Music Chart Awards.

In April 2009, Zhang won the Most Popular Male Singer Award in Mainland China at the MusicRadio China TOP Chart Awards. In November, Zhang released Through Trilogy (穿越三部曲). In 2010, he received the Best Asian Artist award at the Mnet Asian Music Awards, becoming the first Chinese-language singer to receive the award. He released his It’s Love (这，就是爱) on November 13. He also attended the TVB8 Awards in Hong Kong as the only invited male singer from mainland China and received the Mainland Audience’s Favorite Male Singer Award and a Top Ten Golden Songs Award.

In 2011, Zhang released Stand Up (最接近天堂的地方) and received the Most Popular Album award at the China TOP Rankings.. In April 2012, Zhang launched his first concert tour, beginning at the Great Hall of the People in Beijing. In May, Zhang issued a public apology for not fulfilling his promise of holding two free concerts for the fans who raised the funds to pay off the breach of contract fine and termination fee to Sum Entertainment in 2007. He promised to donate 200,000,000 yuan to charity and to hold one free concert soon. In December, Zhang received the Most Popular Idol of the Decade Award at Baidu Music’s 10th anniversary ceremony and the Mainland Most Popular Male Singer Award at the China POP Chart in Taipei.

In 2013, Zhang made his debut appearance at the CCTV Spring Festival Gala, in a duet with Yoga Lin. In 2014, Zhang participated in the television competition I Am a Singer finishing third and launched the Fight Back For Love (为爱逆战) tour. In November, he was presented with the International Artist Award at the American Music Awards, becoming the first Chinese singer to receive the award. He served as a mentor for the first time on The Most Beautiful Harmony Season 3 (最美和声第三季) in 2015 and collaborated with Xiaomi to release the album 10 (拾).

=== 2016–present: Planet Culture ===
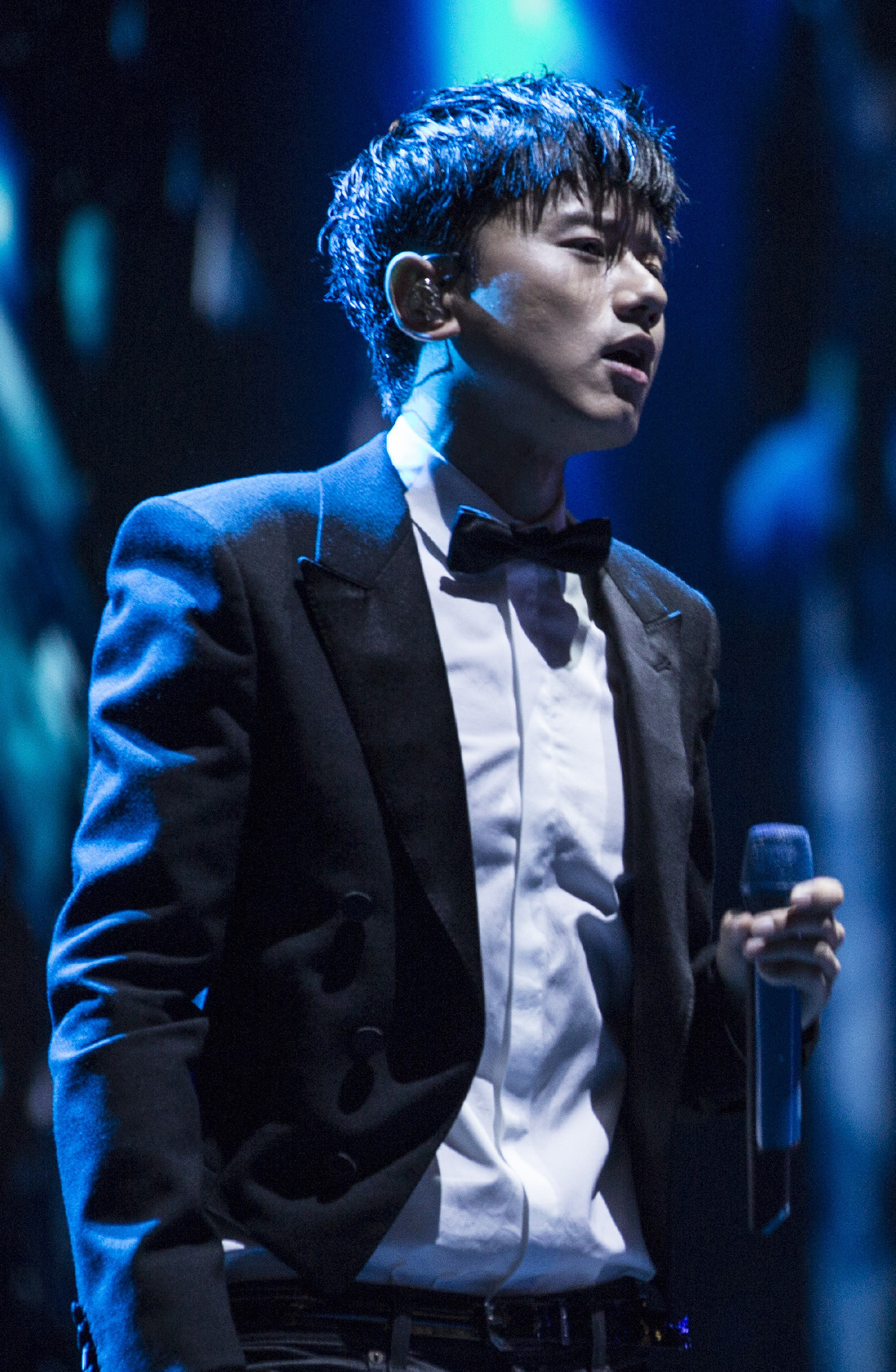
Zhang in 2017, Kuala Lumpur

In February 2016, Zhang held the “Just For Star” concert in Los Angeles, featuring guest performers David Foster and Lindsey Stirling. In April, he established his music label Planet Culture. In May, Zhang launched his first world tour The Sound of My Heart (我想). Throughout the year, Zhang recorded songs connected with international film releases, including "Lost in the Stars" for Star Trek Beyond and "Give You My World" for Allied, and collaborated with X Ambassadors on "Torches" for Transformers: The Last Knight.

In 2017, he rejoined the singing competition I Am a Singer and expanded his world tour both domestically and internationally, covering cities including New York, Vancouver, Kuala Lumpur, London, and Milan, and became the first mainland Chinese singer to perform at the Dolby Theatre in Los Angeles. In December, he received the Best Pop Singer Award at the China Golden Record Awards.

In 2018, he released his 12th studio album FUTURE·LIVE (未·LIVE), introducing a “Mix-Pop” approach that blends electronic, rock, and traditional Chinese elements, including the integration of operatic vocal techniques, rap, and electronic production. The album achieved Gold, Platinum, and Double Platinum certifications from the International Federation of the Phonographic Industry (IFPI) in mainland China. On August 11, the FUTURE·LIVE (未·LIVE) tour debuted at Beijing National Stadium, where more than 80,000 tickets sold out in 2 minutes and 38 seconds, setting a single-show box office record at the venue.

In 2019, he continued the FUTURE·LIVE (未·LIVE) tour across 17 cities before concluding it at Beijing National Stadium, where he again set new box office records. He also crossed into theater, starring in the stage play Ago (曾经如是) directed and written by Stan Lai, in which he played the male lead Dorje. In 2020, he released his first English studio album Risk It All and the reinterpretation album Listen! Our Song (听！我们的歌), followed by an online concert (due to COVID-19) on July 30, which attracted nearly 15 million viewers.

In 2021, he released album Deserve Better (值得更好的) and began the Future Live: Brilliance concert tour in December. In 2023, he released his sixteenth studio album Wainan Street 1982 (外南街1982) on January 11 and released EP The Seventh Day of Winter on December 27. He held his year-end concert series Future, Hello (未·你好吗), from December 29-31 in Chengdu. Its stage design later received the MUSE Award, the iF Design Award, and the French Design Gold Award.

In December 2024, the concert film, Jason Zhang Brilliance Tour, was released in China and ranked first at the daily box office with approximately 28 million yuan. In addition, the 45-minute music film associated with his album Not Bad (要得) was also released online in December 2024. In 2025, the film received six international awards, including Best Music Video, Best Foreign Language Short Film, and Best Actor at the Los Angeles Independent Shorts Awards.

In 2026, from March 27 to April 19, Zhang held 16 consecutive concerts at the Beijing National Stadium over a 24-day period, marking it the longest consecutive concert run at a single stadium. The performances formed the final domestic leg of his FUTURE·LIVE: Leave for 1982 (未·LIVE开往1982) world tour, which began in 2024 and had reached 141 shows to date, with international dates yet to be announced.

== Discography ==
=== Studio albums ===
1. The First Album 第一张 (2005-03-15)
2. Love Me Again 再爱我一回 (2006-09-20)
3. Most Beautiful Sun 最美的太阳 (2007-12-17)
4. The Day After Tomorrow 明天过后 (2008-09-15)
5. Through Trilogy 穿越三部曲 (2009-11-02)
6. It's Love 这，就是爱 (2010-11-21)
7. Stand Up 最接近天堂的地方 (2011-11-16)
8. One Chance 新歌+精选 (2012-09-29)
9. The Love Songs We Once Encountered 那些和我们打过招呼的爱情 (2012-11-26)
10. Just Love 爱，不解释(2013-12-18)
11. Ten 拾 (2015-04-15)
12. Future Live 未·LIVE (2018-10-12)
13. Risk It All 声来无畏 (2020-06-24)
14. Songs of Youth (2020-07-23)
15. You Deserve Better 值得更好的 (2021-10-26)
16. Wainan Street 1982 外南街1982 (2022-12-20)
17. Not Bad 要得 (2024-03-22)

=== EP ===
1. Love, and Courage 越爱越强 (2016-08-20)
2. Lover 爱人啊 (2020-04-28)
3. The Seventh Day of Winter 冬月初七 (2023-12-27)

== Concerts ==
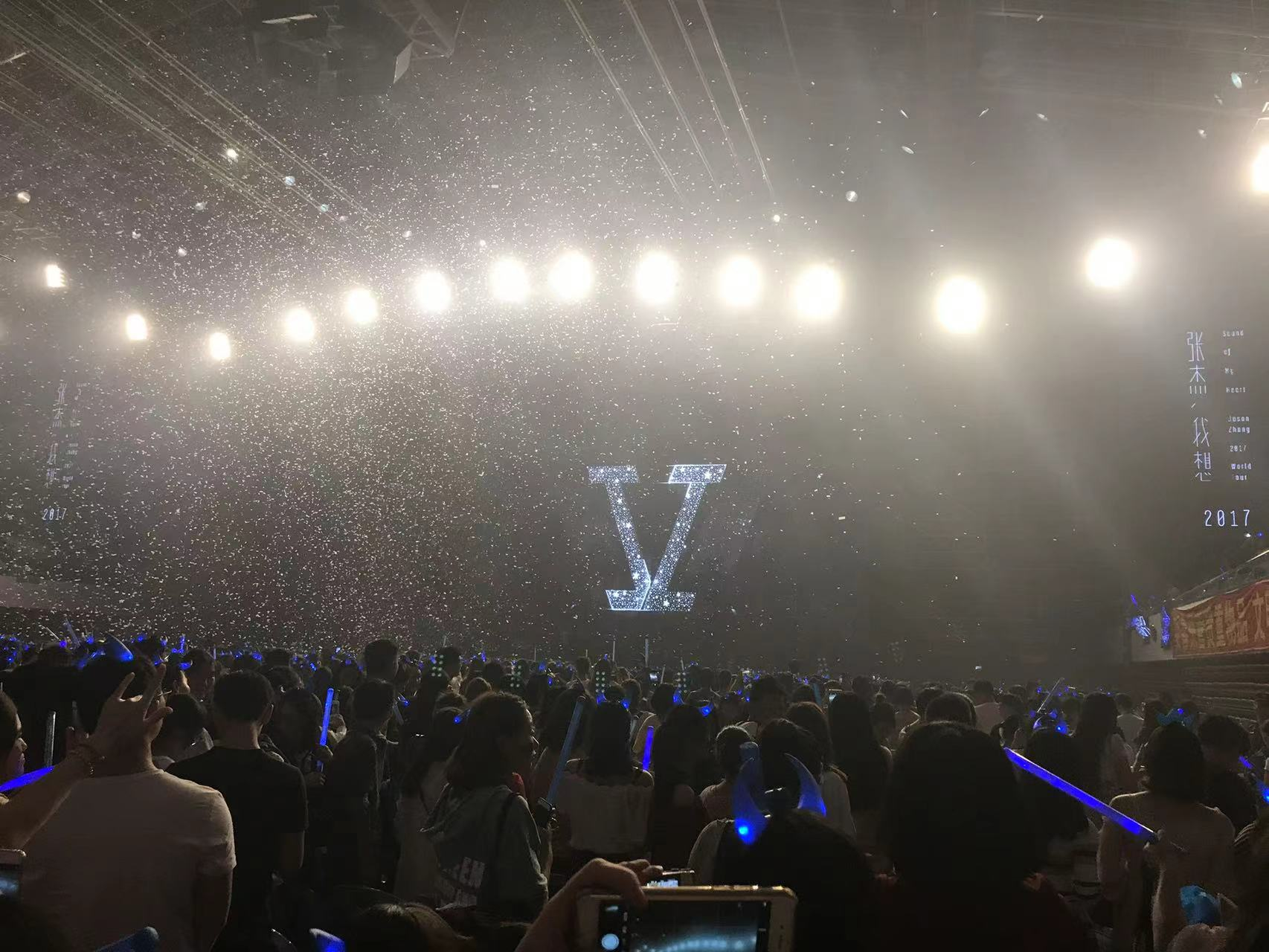
Sound of My Heart Concert in 2017

=== Tour ===
- Begin With Star 闪耀星空、从星开始 (2008, 2 shows)
- Love · Uniquely Jie 爱·杰然不同 (2012, 2 shows)
- Fight Back The Love 为爱逆战 (2014, 8 shows)
- Sound Of My Heart 我想 (2016–2017, 25 shows)
- FUTURE·LIVE 未·LIVE (2018–2019, 17 shows)
- FUTURE·LIVE: Brilliance 曜·北斗 (2021-2023, 23 shows)
- FUTURE·LIVE: Leave For 1982 开往1982 (2024-2026, 141 shows)

=== Single concerts ===
- Through the Crowd 穿越人海 (2009, 1 show)
- It's Love 这，就是爱 (2010, 1 show)
- It's Love 这，就是爱 (2011, 1 show)
- It's Love 这，就是爱 (2012, 1 show)
- It's Love 这，就是爱 (2013, 1 show)
- Looking Up at the Starry Sky free concert 仰望星空 (2012, 1 show)
- Just For Star (2016, 1 show)
- FUTURE, Hello New Year concert 未·你好吗 (2023, 3 shows)
- FUTURE, Hello New Year concert 未·你好吗 (2024, 3 shows)
- FUTURE, Hello New Year concert 未·你好吗 (2025, 3 shows)

== Variety shows ==
Year	Title	Channel	Role
2004	My Style and My Show	Dragon TV	Contestant
2007	Super Boy	Hunan TV	Contestant
2014	I Am A Singer Season Two	Hunan TV	Contestant
2015	The Most Beautiful Harmony Season Three	Beijing TV	Mentor
2017	Singer 2017	Hunan TV	Contestant
2017	The Next Season Two	Dragon TV	Mentor
2018	Produce 101 China	Tencent Video	Mentor
2021	Time Concert Season One	Hunan TV	Host
2023	Infinity and Beyond 2023	Hunan TV	Host
2023	Time Concert Season Three	Hunan TV	Host

== Personal life ==
=== Philanthropy ===
The “Jason Zhang Music Dream Classrooms” is a charitable initiative founded by Zhang under the Beidou Stars Love Fund (北斗星空爱心基金), which operates within the China Population Welfare Foundation. Zhang personally contributed RMB 2 million as initial funding for the project, which was launched in October 2012. As of August 2025, a total of 107 Music Dream Classrooms had been established across various regions in China. The project focuses on improving access to music education for young people. In December 2015, it received the Top Ten Fashion Role Models Award at the Global Fashion Ceremony, and in November 2019, it was selected as one of the S20 Celebrity Charity Classic Cases (2018) by the China Foundation for Poverty Alleviation.

=== Education and academic activities ===
From June to September 2013, Zhang undertook further studies in music at the Berklee College of Music. On 4 December 2019, he was appointed as a specially appointed vocal instructor and associate researcher at the Film and Television Arts Department of Shanghai University. On 3 September 2021, he appeared at the university’s freshman opening ceremony, where his “Jason Zhang Music LIVE” public course was officially launched.

=== Family ===
On 6 August 2011, Zhang and Chinese television host Xie Na, who holds the Guinness World Records as the first person to accumulate 100 million followers on Weibo, announced their engagement via social media. On 5 May 2011, they registered their marriage in Chengdu, China. On 26 September 2011, they married in Shangri-La, Diqing Prefecture, China. On 1 February 2018, their twin daughters were born. In May 2021, their third daughter was born in May 2021.

== Awards and achievements ==
Year	Date	Awards	Category	Works	Ref.
2003	April	Samsung-MTV National Singing Competition	2nd		
2004	7 August	My Show	Champion		
2005	4 September	5th Global Chinese Music Awards	Best New Artist		
2005	3 December	Hong Kong TVB8 Awards	Golden		
2006	11 January	第12届全球华语音乐榜中榜	内地传媒大奖		
2006	5 March	第10届无锡七彩华语歌曲排行榜	Most Popular New Artist		
2006	11 March	9+2 Guangzhou Music Pioneer	Most Popular New Artist		
2006	25 March	第13届东方风云榜	Top 10 Golden Songs	The Love of Plough 北斗星的爱	
2007	6 July	Super Boy	4th		
2008	April	Chinese Music Alliance	Golden Songs in the 1st season	The Most Beautiful Sun 最美的太阳	
2008	15 November	6th SETV Hit Music Awards	Most Popular Male Singer (Mainland)		
2008	December	Chinese Music Alliance	Golden Songs in the 4th season	The Day After Tomorrow 明天过后	
2008	22 December	4th BQ Awards	Best Album	The Day After Tomorrow 明天过后	
2009	12 January	2008 Chinese Music Alliance	Annual Golden Songs	The Day After Tomorrow 明天过后	
2009	12 February	2008 Baidu Entertainment Boiling Point	Annual Top 10 Golden Songs	The Day After Tomorrow 明天过后	
2009	26 April	2008 Music Radio China TOP ranking	Most Popular Male Singer (Mainland)		
2009	26 April	2008 Music Radio China TOP ranking	Annual Golden Songs	天下	
2009	19 June	6th Hit Song Awards	Most Popular Male Singer (Mainland)		
2009	19 June	6th Hit Song Awards	内地杰出青年男歌手		
2009	19 June	6th Hit Song Awards	年度金曲奖	The Day After Tomorrow 明天过后	
2009	21 September	Chinese Music Alliance	第一季度金曲奖	We are the same 我们都一样	
2009	21 September	Chinese Music Alliance	第二季度金曲奖	Stars and Shooting Stars 恒星流星	
2009	6 November	7th SETV Hit Music Awards	Most Popular Male Singer (Mainland)		
2009	6 November	7th SETV Hit Music Awards	Annual Top 10 Golden Songs	勿忘心安	
2010		Chinese Music Alliance	Golden Songs in the 3rd season	勿忘心安	
2010		Chinese Music Alliance	Golden Songs in the 4th season	看月亮爬上来	
2010		2009 Baidu Entertainment Boiling Point	Most Popular Idol		
2010		2009 Chinese Music Alliance	Most Popular Male Singer (Mainland)		
2010		2009 Chinese Music Alliance	Annual Golden Songs	看月亮爬上来	
2010		Music Pioneer Awards	Most Popular Male Singer (Mainland)		
2010		Music Pioneer Awards	Most Popular Male Singer		
2010		Music Pioneer Awards	Annual Golden Songs	看月亮爬上来	
2010		第三届城市之音至尊金榜	Top 20 Songs	看月亮爬上来	
2010		第三届城市之音至尊金榜	2009年度冠军王	Through Trilogy 穿越三部曲	
2010		2009 Music Radio China TOP ranking	Most Popular Male Singer (Mainland)		
2010		2009 Music Radio China TOP ranking	年度点播冠军		
2010		2009 Music Radio China TOP ranking	Annual Golden Songs	穿越人海	
2010	28 November	Mnet Asian Music Awards (MAMA)	Best Asian Artist		
2010		8th SETV Hit Music Awards	Most Popular Male Singer (Mainland)		
2010		8th SETV Hit Music Awards	Top 10 Golden Songs	穿越人海	
2010		Hong Kong TVB8 Awards	Most Popular Male Singer (Mainland)		
2010		Hong Kong TVB8 Awards	Top 10 Golden Songs	看月亮爬上来	
2011		2010 Baidu Entertainment Boiling Point	Most Popular Male Singer (Mainland)		
2011		2010 Baidu Entertainment Boiling Point	Top 10 Golden Songs (Mainland)	It's Love 这,就是爱	
2011		2010 Chinese Music Alliance	Most Popular Male Singer (Mainland)		
2011		2010 Chinese Music Alliance	Annual Golden Songs	It's Love 这,就是爱	
2011		2010 Spirite Original Music Awards	Most Popular Male Singer (Mainland)		
2011		2010 Spirite Original Music Awards	Annual Golden Songs		
2011		第四届城市之音至尊金榜	年度至尊金榜冠军王		
2011		第四届城市之音至尊金榜	年度空中热播单曲	It's Love 这,就是爱	
2011		全球流行音乐金榜	年度点播冠军		
2011		全球流行音乐金榜	Annual Golden Songs	It's Love 这,就是爱	
2011		2010 Music Radio China TOP ranking	Most Popular Male Singer (Mainland)		
2011		2010 Music Radio China TOP ranking	年度点播冠军		
2011		2010 Music Radio China TOP ranking	Annual Golden Songs	It's Love 这,就是爱	
2011		8th Sony Awards	大型综合节目类一等奖	《这，就是爱》创意秀	
2011		第八届劲歌王金曲金榜	Most Popular Male Singer (Mainland)		
2011		第八届劲歌王金曲金榜	Outstanding Young Singer		
2011		第八届劲歌王金曲金榜	Most Popular Album (Mandarin)	It's Love 这,就是爱	
2012		2011 Chinese Music Alliance	Most Popular Male Singer (Mainland)		
2012		2011 Chinese Music Alliance	Annual Golden Songs	The First Lady 第一夫人	
2012		2011 Spirite Original Music Awards	Most Popular Male Singer (Mainland)		
2012		2011 Spirite Original Music Awards	Annual Golden Songs (Mainland)		
2012		2011 Spirite Original Music Awards	IN Ringtone	火鸟	
2012		第五届城市之音至尊金榜	年度至尊金榜冠军王		
2012		第五届城市之音至尊金榜	Annual Top 20 Golden Songs	Stand Up 最接近天堂的地方	
2012		第16届全球华语榜中榜	Most Popular Male Singer (Mainland)		
2012		第16届全球华语榜中榜	Annual Top 10 Golden Songs	Stand Up 最接近天堂的地方	
2012		2011 Music Radio China TOP ranking	Most Popular Male Singer (Mainland)		
2012		2011 Music Radio China TOP ranking	Most Popular Album (Mainland)	Stand Up 最接近天堂的地方	
2012		2011 Music Radio China TOP ranking	Annual Golden Songs	Stand Up 最接近天堂的地方	
2012		第2届全球流行音乐金榜	CITY FM 城市之音年度推崇大奖		
2012		第2届全球流行音乐金榜	Annual Top 20 Golden Songs	Stand Up 最接近天堂的地方	
2012		2012 MIGU Inspirational Music Awards	Best Inspirational Male Singer		
2012		2012 MIGU Inspirational Music Awards	Most Popular Inspirational Song	高飞	
2012		2012 Baidu Entertainment Boiling Point	Supreme Popular Idol in the past 10 years		
2012		第六届中国移动无线音乐盛典	Most Popular Lyrical Song	秋天的童话	
2012		第六届中国移动无线音乐盛典	Most Popular Album	Stand Up 最接近天堂的地方	
2012		2012 Chinese Music Alliance	Most Popular Male Singer (Mainland)		
2012		2012 Chinese Music Alliance	Annual Golden Songs		
2013		第17届《全球华语榜中榜》	Most Popular Male Singer (Mainland)		
2013		第17届《全球华语榜中榜》	Channel[V] 劲爆歌手奖		
2013		第17届《全球华语榜中榜》	最佳翻唱金曲奖	The Sky 天空	
2013		2012 Music Radio China TOP ranking	Best Male Singer (Mainland)		
2013		2012 Music Radio China TOP ranking	最佳舞台演绎		
2013		2012 Music Radio China TOP ranking	Annual Golden Songs	The Sky 天空	
2013		第六届城市至尊音乐盛典	Most Popular Male Singer (Mainland)		
2013		第六届城市至尊音乐盛典	Top 20 Golden Songs	The Sky 天空	
2013		Public Music Awards	Best Male Singer		
2013		2013 Youth Choice Awards	Most Popular Male Singer (Mainland)		
2013		第七届无线音乐盛典	Most Popular Male Singer (Mainland)		
2014	February	2013 Malaysia Hit 30 Awards	Annual Top 30 Golden Songs	突然想爱你	
2014	February	2013 Malaysia Hit 30 Awards	Annual Top 10 Album	那些和我们打过招呼的爱情	
2014	31 March	第21届东方风云榜颁奖盛典	Most Popular Male Singer (Mainland)		
2014	31 March	第21届东方风云榜颁奖盛典	Annual Top 10 Golden Songs	他不懂	
2014	6 April	第四届全球流行音乐金榜	MusicRadio 音乐之声年度点播冠军	Just Love 爱，不解释	
2014	13 April	第14届音乐风云榜年度盛典	Most Popular Male Singer (Mainland)		
2014	13 April	第14届音乐风云榜年度盛典	飞跃大奖		
2014	23 April	第十八届全球华语榜中榜颁奖盛典	Most Popular Male Singer (Mainland)		
2014	23 April	第十八届全球华语榜中榜颁奖盛典	Best Music Video	Just Love 爱，不解释	
2014		2013 Music Radio China TOP ranking	Best Male Singer (Mainland)		
2014		2013 Music Radio China TOP ranking	Annual Best Golden Songs(Mainland)	Just Love 爱，不解释	
2014		2013 Music Radio China TOP ranking	Annual Most Popular Album	Just Love 爱，不解释	
2014	22 May	KUGOU Music Awards	Annual Best Male Singer (Mainland)		
2014	22 May	KUGOU Music Awards	Top 10 Songs in the past 10 years	It's Love 这，就是爱	
2014	22 May	KUGOU Music Awards	Annual Best Album	Just Love 爱，不解释	
2014	22 May	第七届城市至尊音乐榜音乐盛典	Most Popular Male Singer (Mainland)		
2014	22 May	第七届城市至尊音乐榜音乐盛典	Most Popular Songs		
2014	22 May	第七届城市至尊音乐榜音乐盛典	Annual Top 20 Golden Songs	Just Love 爱，不解释	
2014	September	Malaysia ONE FM Hit 30 ranking	第二季劲爆王		
2014	23 November	American Music Awards (AMA)	Best International Artist		
2014	13 December	第八届无线音乐盛典	Most Popular Male Singer (Mainland)		
2014	13 December	第八届无线音乐盛典	Annual Most Popular Album	Just Love 爱，不解释	
2014	17 December	2014 Chinese Teleplay Awards	Most Popular Soundtracks	剑心	
2015	8 February	2014 中国校园文艺榜中榜	年度最受青少年喜爱的男歌手奖		
2015	8 February	2014 中国校园文艺榜中榜	Annual Best Artist		
2015	15 February	2014 Weibo Music Awards	杰出歌王		
2015	15 February	2014 Weibo Music Awards	Annual Popular Songs	Ten Years Ago 时光十年	
2015	15 February	2014 Weibo Music Awards	年度人气翻唱歌曲	爱的供养	
2015	25 March	2015 QQ Music Awards	Most Popular Male Singer (Mainland)		
2015	25 March	2015 QQ Music Awards	Annual Most Influential Concert	为爱逆战	
2015	30 March	第22届东方风云榜音乐盛典	Best Male Singer (Mainland)		
2015	30 March	第22届东方风云榜音乐盛典	Asian Popular Singer		
2015	30 March	第22届东方风云榜音乐盛典	Annual Top 10 Golden Songs	剑心	
2015	16 April	第19届全球华语榜中榜亚洲影响力大典	Most Popular Male Singer (Mainland)		
2015	16 April	第19届全球华语榜中榜亚洲影响力大典	Most Popular Concert	为爱逆战	
2015	23 April	2015 KU Music Awards	Most Popular Live Singer		
2015	23 April	2015 KU Music Awards	Annual Best Singer		
2015	23 April	2015 KU Music Awards	Best Concert	为爱逆战	
2015	6 November	第十五届全球华语歌曲排行榜颁奖礼	Best Male Singer (Mainland)		
2015	6 November	第十五届全球华语歌曲排行榜颁奖礼	Most Popular Male Singer (Mainland)		
2015	6 November	第十五届全球华语歌曲排行榜颁奖礼	Golden Songs	剑心	
2015	6 November	第十五届全球华语歌曲排行榜颁奖礼	最受欢迎对唱金曲	燕归巢	
2016	28 March	23rd 东方风云榜	Best Male Singer		
2016	28 March	23rd 东方风云榜	Top 20 Songs		
2016	28 March	23rd 东方风云榜	最受欢迎对唱金曲	燕归巢	
2016	29 March	Ku Music Awards			
2016	15 April	China Macau Awards			
2016	28 July	Tecent/MTV Asia Music Gala	Best Male Singer (Mainland)		

== Published works ==
Title	Date published	Type
The Fleeting Time (杰出的流年)	11 April 2008	Biography
Be Yourself (张杰的假日时光)	1 January 2009	Photo book
