= Shen'ao Fishing Port =

Fishing port in Ruifang, New Taipei, Taiwan

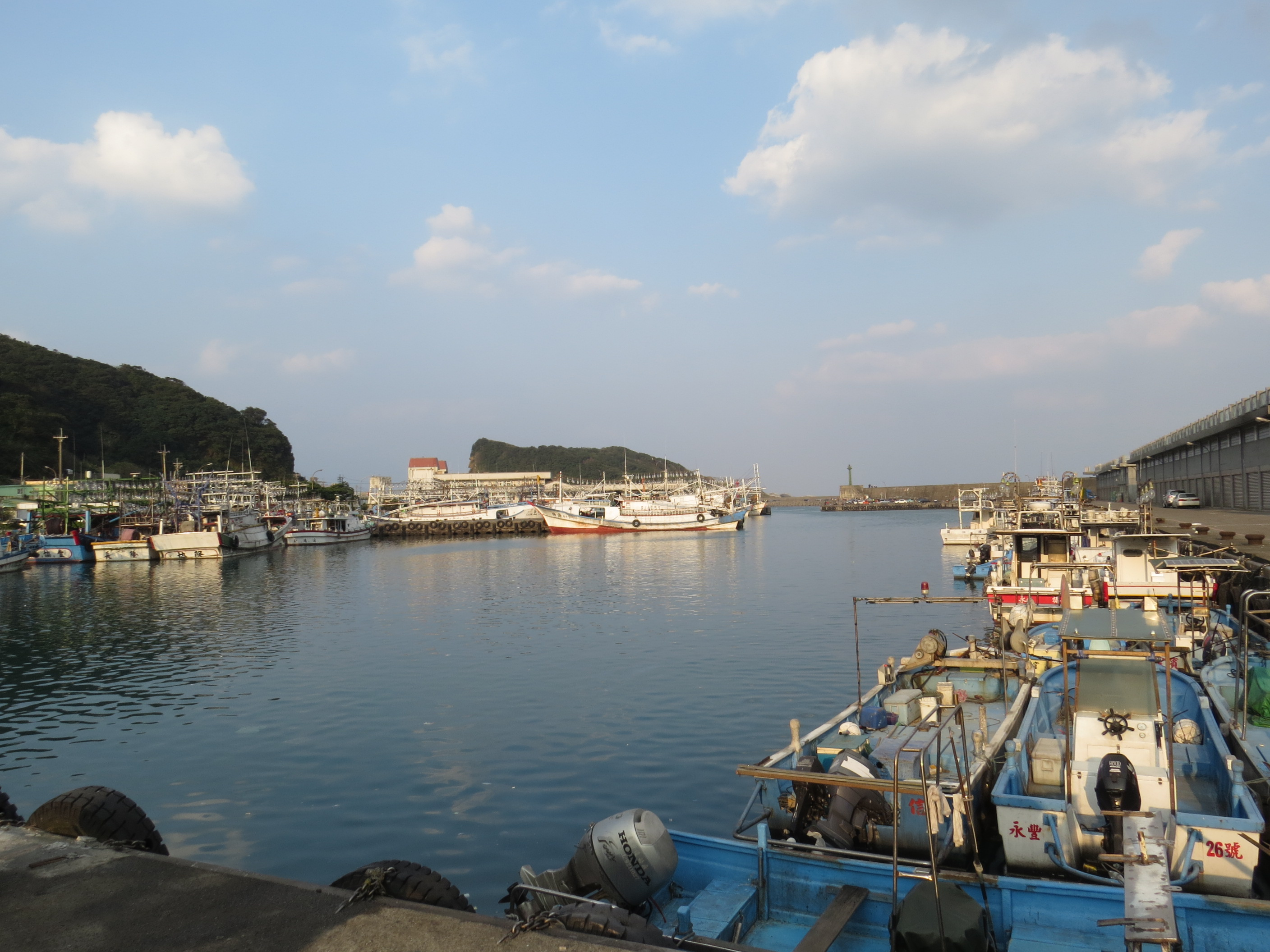
- Interactive map of Shen'ao Fishing Port
- Location within Taiwan
- Native name: 深澳漁港

Location
- Location: Ruifang, New Taipei, Taiwan
- Coordinates: 25°08′08.4″N 121°49′28.5″E

Details
- Type of Harbor: fishing port

The Shen'ao Fishing Port (traditional Chinese: 深澳漁港; simplified Chinese: 深澳渔港; pinyin: Shēn'ào Yúgǎng) is a fishing harbor in Ruifang District, New Taipei, Taiwan.

== Name ==
The port has been nicknamed Fan Zi Ao due to its shape representing the look of tribal leader.

== History ==
The port used to have more than 20 fishing vessels which were used for fish catching and recreational purpose. However, a new regulation enacted in 2012 mandated the fishing vessels used for recreational purpose pass the inspection for passenger vessels standards. Therefore, the port failed to renew the license for recreational vessels. In 2018, the 310-meter long Haitian Walkway viewing platform was constructed next to the port.

== Features ==
The port has a footpath designed for people to have a lookout of Jinguashi and Jiufen.

== See also ==
- New Taipei
