= Han Lei =

Han Lei 韩磊
- Also known as: Uncle Han (韩大叔), Uncle Meng (萌大叔), Senbor
- Born: February 23, 1968 (age 58); Hohhot, Inner Mongolia, China
- Genres: Mandopop, Chinese folk
- Occupation: Singer
- Instruments: Vocals
- Years active: 1991–present
- Labels: China Vision Golden Tripod (Beijing) Culture Media Co., Ltd. (中视金鼎文化传媒有限责任公司)

Han Lei (simplified Chinese: 韩磊; traditional Chinese: 韓磊; born February 23, 1968), also known in Mongolian as Senbor, is a Chinese folk and pop singer-songwriter of Mongolian ethnicity. Renowned for his powerful, resonant voice, Han has been a prominent figure in the Chinese music industry for over three decades. He is best known for his fusion of traditional ethnic elements with contemporary pop and his extensive work on theme songs for TV dramas and films. Han has performed on multiple CCTV Spring Festival Galas and won the inaugural season of the singing competition I Am a Singer in 2014. In 2025, he received the Weibo Music Awards - Annual Industry Achievement Award for his enduring contributions to Chinese music.

== Early life and education ==
Han Lei was born on 23 February 1968 in Hohhot, Inner Mongolia, to a family with artistic inclinations. His father was of Han Chinese descent and a veteran of the Chinese Civil War, while his mother was Mongolian and worked as a kindergarten teacher; Han registered under his mother's ethnicity. Growing up in a culturally rich environment, he developed an early interest in music. In 1982, at the age of 14, Han enrolled at the Affiliated Middle School of the Central Conservatory of Music in Beijing, where he studied the trombone. In 1988, he toured western Europe with the Central Conservatory Youth Symphony Orchestra. From 1989 to around 1991, he served as a trombonist in the Inner Mongolia Opera House Symphony Orchestra, a career he did not foresee much promise. He quit this job around 1991 and set off to Beijing to pursue a career as a singer.

== Career ==
Han Lei made his debut in July 1991 at the "New Voice" show (新人新声), his performance was well received by industry experts and audience. In 1992, he gained recognition by singing the theme song "Blue Sky, Blue Sea" (天蓝蓝海蓝蓝) for TV drama series Tides Rise and Fall (潮起潮落), followed by "Roam the Four Corners" (走四方, zou sifang) for TV drama series All the Way to Dusk (一路黄昏), which earned him the 1993 Cross-Year Golden Song Award and the 1994 China Music Television Bronze Award.

Han rose to prominence in 1997 on the CCTV New Year's Gala, performing a song called "1997, A.D." (公元一九九七); in 1998 he returned to the Gala to perform "Zou Sifang" (走四方), one of the most memorable performances in the song and dance category of the Gala that year, which became his signature hit and propelled him to national stardom. He has since appeared on the Gala eight more times, the most recent performance in the 2017 show.

Han has recorded over 700 theme songs for various Chinese TV Series, including the introductory theme to Kangxi Dynasty, "Borrow Another Five Hundred Years from Heaven" (向天在借五百年). He also performed the main theme "I'll Go with you to the Ends of the Earth" (跟着你到天边) in film Coming Home directed by Zhang Yimou.

Han also participated in the second season of Hunan Television show I Am a Singer (now Singer) in 2014 and won; he was the first solo singer to win (the precedent, Yu Quan, was a duet performer), and Han remained as the only male solo winning singer until Liu Huan five seasons later.

== Personal life ==
Han was born February 23, 1968, and raised in Hohhot, Inner Mongolia. He is of Mongol descent through his mother, and Han Chinese descent through his father. Han was currently a member of the Honorary Chairperson of the "Inner Mongol's Youth League" (内蒙古青联). Han married Wang Yan (王燕), a fellow Inner Mongolian, in 2007. Together they had a son and a daughter.
