= Li Na (singer) =

Chinese folk singer

- Born: 牛志红; Niú Zhìhóng; July 25, 1963 (age 61); Zhengzhou, Henan, China
- Musical career
- Also known as: Shi Changsheng (Dharma name)

Niu Zhihong (born July 25, 1963), better known by her stage name Li Na, is a Chinese folk singer that gained particular popularity in the late 1980s and the 1990s China for singing many theme songs of highly-popular TV series, such as Kewang (1990). Earlier in her career she was a singer in Yu operas.

Her signature song is "Qingzang Gaoyuan" (青藏高原, "Tibetan Plateau"), theme song of the 1994 TV series Heaven Road (天路).

In 1997 she became a Buddhist nun at Mount Wutai with the Dharma name Shi Changsheng (释昌圣; "Master Changsheng"). Since then she has released several albums on Buddhist music. She currently resides in the United States.
