= Luo Qi (singer) =

Chinese singer

Luo Qi (Chinese: 罗琦; born 6 June 1975 in Nanchang) is a Chinese rock singer. She was singer with the first lineup of Zhinanzhen (Compass), but then went solo. In 1998 she left China for Berlin for six years where she also married her husband, Jan who played a part in helping her kick her drug addiction. In 2004, recalling her own struggles as a teen with drugs, she came forward as an anti drug spokesperson.

== Career ==
- debut and start singing when she was 13.
- 1991, Luo Qi was fascinated by "rock and roll" by listening to Bon Jovi's music. Then became the lead vocal of 指南针乐队(Compass).
- 1993, Luo Qi conflicted with others in her friend's birthday party, the one pierced her left eye with a beer bottle. At the same year, her band published their first album-选择坚强.
- 1994, Luo Qi became a solo singer.
- 1995, Luo Qi became host in a Chinese program of ChannelV. And the same time, she started taking drugs.
- 1996, first solo album-快乐机器(Happy Machine).
- 1998, Her entertainment helped her make a record of 3 singles: 新天,让我自己来,昨夜有梦. Went to Germany after her drug treatment.
- 2004, Luo Qi went back to China with her husband. Publish a single named 永恒的一天 in the end of May.
- 2011, establish a band named 冷空气乐队(Cold Air).

== Albums ==
| Name | Publish Time | Language |
|---|---|---|
| 把你唱醉 | 1994 | Mandarin |
| 快乐机器 | 1996 | Mandarin |

== Concert ==
| Time | Holding Name | Holding Times |
|---|---|---|
| 2006-06-06 | 今天是我生日 | 1 |
| 2009-10-31 | “梁祝之夜把爱唱响”中国摇滚情歌演唱会 | 1 |
