= Phil Chang =

- 張宇
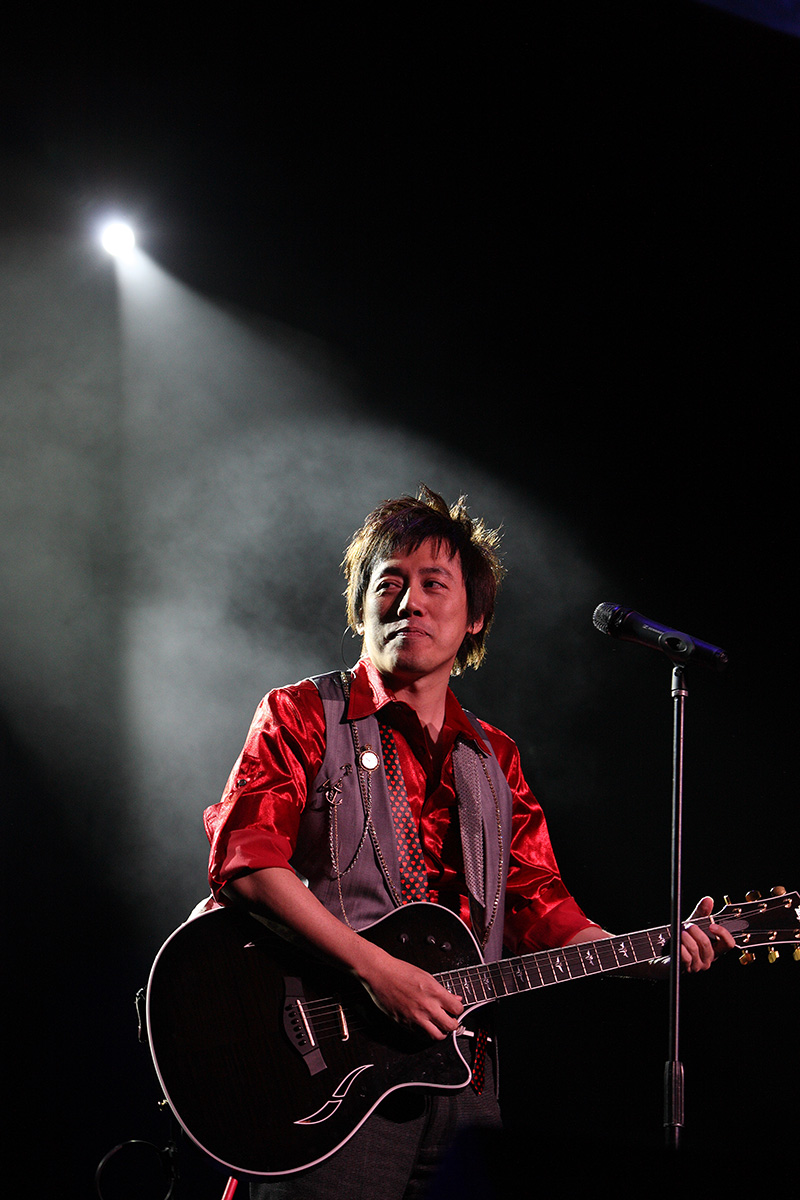
- Born: Chang Po-hsiang (張博翔(Pe̍h-ōe-jī: Tiuⁿ Phok-siông)); 30 April 1967 (age 59); Taipei, Taiwan
- Education: Feng Chia University
- Occupations: Singer, songwriter, television presenter, actor
- Years active: 1992–2018, 2020-present
- Spouse: Hsiao Hui-wen (Shi Yi-lang) (m. 1997)
- Children: 2

Chinese name
- Traditional Chinese: 張宇
- Simplified Chinese: 张宇
Transcriptions
Standard Mandarin
- Hanyu Pinyin: zhang1 yu3
Hakka
- Pha̍k-fa-sṳ: Chong Yí
Yue: Cantonese
- Jyutping: Zoeng1 Jyu5
Southern Min
- Hokkien POJ: Tiuⁿ Ú
- Musical career
- Also known as: Chang Yu
- Genres: Mandopop, ballad, soft rock
- Instruments: Piano, guitar, vocals
- Label: EMI Music

Phil Chang (Chinese: 張宇; pinyin: Zhāng Yǔ; Pe̍h-ōe-jī: Tiuⁿ Ú; Pha̍k-fa-sṳ: Chong Yí, born 30 April 1967) is a Taiwanese singer-songwriter, television presenter and actor.

== Education and career ==
By the time he graduated from Feng Chia University in financial services, he was already known as an accomplished folk singer, pianist and guitar-player. He issued his first album, Walking the Wind, in 1992, and achieved success with his second, Well-intentioned, in 1993. In 1997 he married long-term partner, lyricist Hsiao Hui-wen (蕭慧文), who uses the pen name Shi Yi-lang (十一郎). His 1999 album Sun and Moon was another big hit.

In 2004, he joined Chang Hsiao-yen to co-host Happy Sunday, replacing Taiwanese girl group S.H.E.

On 30 April 2007 he began presenting his own show on satellite channel TVBS-G, Why Men Do wrong.

In 2008, he was one of the stars of the Taiwanese television series "歡喜來逗陣" (MOE Taiwanese Hokkien recommended characters: 歡喜來鬥陣; Pe̍h-ōe-jī: Hoaⁿ-hí lâi tàu-tīn).

In 2014 he took part in I Am a Singer (season 2) as a contestant and host. He made it to the 2nd part of the finals and was placed 6th overall.

In 2020, he revealed on YouTube interview that he had been on hiatus since 2018 to self-study about Chinese medicine and acupuncture.

== Discography ==
=== Studio albums ===
- 1993: Walking the wind (走路有風)
- 1993: Well-intentioned (用心良苦)
- 1994 溫故知心, Intimate insights
- 1995 一言難盡, It's hard to say
- 1996 消息, News.
- 1997 整個八月, The whole of August
- 1997 溫古知新.一個人的天荒地老 (Warm new knowledge. A person's old days old)
- 1998 EP 單戀, Unrequited love
- 1998 月亮太陽, Sun and Moon
- 1999 雨一直下, Rain Keeps Falling
- 1999 鑽石金選集, Diamond Gold Collection
- 2000 First compilation: 奇蹟·創世紀精選, Miracle. Genesis Featured
- 2001 替身, Substitute
- 2003 大丈夫, If a man
- 2004 不甘寂寞, The Limelight
- 2005 Second compilation: 男人的好, A Good Man
- 2009 Back to 張宇, Back to Zhang Yu
- 2012 心術, Intention
- 2016 好男人的情歌, Good man's love song
- 2017 勇敢說再見, Brave say goodbye

== Filmography ==
=== Film ===
| Year | English title | Original title | Role | Notes |
|---|---|---|---|---|
| 2011 | The Killer Who Never Kills | 殺手‧歐陽盆栽 | Phil Chang | |
| 2017 | The Dreaming Man | 假如王子睡著了 | Uncle | |
| 2018 | Golden Job | 黄金兄弟 | Joe Chen | |

=== Television ===
| Year | English title | Original title | Role | Notes |
|---|---|---|---|---|
| 2001 | Tomorrow | 愛情白皮書 | Chang | Cameo |
| 2009 | Magic 18 | 魔女18號 | Feng Peilun | Cameo |
| 2009 | Calling For Love | 呼叫大明星 | Jack | Cameo |
