= Singer season 7 =

Seventh season of Chinese television series Singer

Singer
- Season 7
- Hosted by: Wu Qing-feng (main show); Hong Tao (Pre-challenge Face-off); He Jiong (Grand Finals)
- Judges: 500 public audiences
- Winner: Liu Huan
- Runner-up: Wu Qing-feng
- Finals venue: Hunan Broadcasting System

Release
- Original network: Hunan Television
- Original release: January 11 – April 12, 2019

Season chronology
- ← Previous; Season 6 Next → Season 8

The seventh season of the Chinese television series Singer (Chinese: 歌手; previously titled I Am a Singer) was broadcast on Hunan Television between January and April 2019. Singer 2019 was produced by Hong Tao, and its music director was Hong Kong senior musician Kubert Leung. The first episode was recorded on January 4, 2019, and first premiered in Mango TV on January 11, 2019. YouTube also broadcast the episodes with the results replaced by commercial snippets.

The season ended on April 12, 2019, and Chinese singer Liu Huan named as the winner. Liu was the first mainland Chinese singer to win since Han Hong in season three, as well as the first male winner since Han Lei in season two. Taiwanese Sodagreen lead singer Wu Qing-feng and Chinese four-member band Super-Vocal (Frank Ju, Ayanga, Cai Chengyu, and ex-member Zheng Yunlong) finished runner-up and third place, respectively. For the first time, the top four singers were all male. This is also the first season since the inaugural season the season ended without the biennial concert held after the final.

== Competition rules ==
Like the previous seasons of I Am a Singer and Singer, Singer 2019 was divided into four rounds of three stages, with seven singers performing for a 500-member audience each week. The electronic voting feature, first appeared as a pre-voting twist in the previous season, were introduced; the electronic voting (up to three votes) was conducted throughout the performance and accounted for 50% of the final score. Similar to the previous seasons, the accumulated votes from both Qualifiers and Knockouts determined which singer would be eliminated from the competition. The Challenge round, first introduced in season three, also returned. It featured a rule for contestants to beat at least four out of the seven remaining singers to stay in the competition.

The announcement of results was also changed: fourteen envelopes displaying the contestants' placements for the current round were placed on the table, among which seven envelopes were named envelopes that had the names of the contestants, and the other seven were numbered envelopes containing placement numbers. One by one, singers were tasked to select one envelope from each category and could view the result alone without the other singers. Singers were given the ability to disclose the results they had viewed—either by bluffing or revealing the actual results—to other contestants as they see fit. While the top four performers were able to receive their information on the placements for the round, the bottom three instead received blank envelopes, similar to season six where the placements were not announced until the Knockouts. The managers also had the option to reveal the electronic voting results.

In terms of song selections, each contestant could only pick their own songs for their first appearance. After each round, if a contestant finished first, the singer may select their own song for next week's show. Additionally, managers or contestants may also survey other performers under isolation, without influencing or impeding other potential contestants.

Beginning from the second round, singers, usually those with higher placements, were given WeChat messages to usher their way to the stage to check envelopes for the bottom three placements. Afterwards, Hong Tao would notify these singers about the safe results for the performance (and in the case of Knockouts, the singers' overall placements) and would sometimes discuss which singer would be eliminated. The remaining singers who did not receive messages would enter the room later, after which Hong Tao would announce the placements for the remaining placements (and in case of overall or challenge placement, the eliminated singer). The electronic voting results, which were also revealed at the end of the show, were announced privately to each singer's respective manager after each performance ended under isolation to other managers with the audio muted.

=== National's Recommended Singer ===
Organised by Sina Weibo, an online spin-off called National's Recommended Singer (踢馆赛全民举荐歌手) premiered on December 27, 2018. Similar to I Am a Singer- Who Will Challenge, singers and online viewers can recommend a potential singer. The requirements are to produce one musical composition, be at least 18 years of age, and be available at the scheduled time arranged by producers. During certain periods—usually a week between the recording and airing dates of the Qualifier Round, viewers are polled online to choose their top eligible singer, and the singer with the most votes is chosen as the National's Recommended Singer, who will then join the panel in the Knockouts where they will separately face a challenge against a Professional Challenger (专业踢馆歌手) in a Pre-Challenge Face-off (踢馆预选赛).

Hosted by Hong Tao, the face-off was streamed exclusively online concurrently with the current Knockout Round; it was not broadcast on television. The votes cast for the face-off were separate from those of the Knockout round, and the outcome (which would not be revealed until the Challenge round) depended on which singer received the majority of the votes. The winner of the face-off was given the Challenger status (and his or her manager) and the right to participate in the competition. However, a loss will result in his or her elimination and ineligibility to participate in the Breakouts, although the singer was still allowed to perform Return performances during the recording of the Challenge round (which was broadcast after the episode's end); due to the change, this is the first season not all previously eliminated singers (outside withdrawn singers) were eligible.

The first round's eligible contestants were Zheng Yiming, Bii, Eric Chou, and Liu Yuning. Voting ended on January 5, 2019, and Liu was voted the first National's Recommended Singer with 1,467,482 votes cast. On January 28, 2019, Jefferson Qian was chosen as the second National's Recommended Singer and faced Super-Vocal finalists for the second Pre-challenge face-off. On the third and final round, Angela Hui was chosen as the third and final National's Recommended Singer and faced Bii.

Although he did not participate in the Pre-Challenge Face-off, Chen Chusheng was also chosen by professionals and immediately became a challenger during the Ultimate Knockout or Challenge Round, due to one singer who did not perform that week because of an injury (see below).

== Contestants ==
The following Singer 2019 contestants are listed in alphabetical order. Singers without a placement for the final are listed as finalists and singers who withdrew are listed as withdrawn.

Key:

– Winner
– Runner-up
– Third place
– Other finalist
– Eliminated/Non-contestant (not eligible for Breakouts)
– National's Recommended Singer

Contestant	Country	Music Partner	Status	Week Entered	Week Exited	Result
ANU	China	Li Haofei	Challenger	Week 2 (Pre-Challenge Face-off)	Week 5 (Knockout round 2); Week 12 (Breakout round)	Eliminated
Bii	Taiwan	—	Challenger	Week 8 (Pre-Challenge Face-off)	Week 9 (Challenge round 3)	Eliminated/Non-contestant
Chen Chusheng	China	Eliza Liang	Challenger	Week 11 (Knockout/Challenge round 4) (Note: Week 11 was a combination of both the Knockout and Challenge round due to a contestant's injury during that week's rehearsal.)	Week 12 (Breakout round) (Note: Chen also appeared on Week 13 (Finals Rush Hour) episode as a guest performer.)	Eliminated
Chyi Yu	Taiwan	Jeffery G	Initial singer	Week 1 (Qualifier round 1)	Week 14 (Finals)	Finalist (Fifth-seventh place)
Escape Plan	China	Low Xinran	Initial singer	Week 1 (Qualifier round 1)	Week 2 (Knockout round 1); Week 12 (Breakout round)	Eliminated
Polina Gagarina	Russia	David	Substitute singer	Week 4 (Qualifier round 2)	Week 14 (Finals)	Finalist (Fifth-seventh place)
Gong Linna	China	Sun Pu	Substitute singer	Week 10 (Qualifier round 4)	Week 14 (Finals)	Finalist (Fifth-seventh place)
Angela Hui	Hong Kong	Peng Qing	Challenger	Week 8 (Pre-Challenge Face-off)	Week 9 (Challenge round 3); Week 12 (Breakout round)	Eliminated
Kristian Kostov	Russia/Bulgaria	Leo Li	Initial singer	Week 1 (Qualifier round 1)	Week 6 (Challenge round 2); Week 12 (Breakout round)	Eliminated
Liu Huan	China	Li Rui	Initial singer	Week 1 (Qualifier round 1)	Week 14 (Finals)	Winner
Liu Yuning	China	—	Challenger	Week 2 (Pre-Challenge Face-off)	Week 3 (Challenge round 1)	Eliminated/Non-contestant
Jefferson Qian	China	—	Challenger	Week 5 (Pre-Challenge Face-off)	Week 6 (Challenge round 2)	Eliminated/Non-contestant
Super-vocal Finalists	China	Neil Gao	Challenger	Week 5 (Pre-Challenge Face-off)	Week 14 (Finals)	Third place
Wu Qing-feng	Taiwan	Guo Tao	Initial singer	Week 1 (Qualifier round 1)	Week 14 (Finals)	Runner-up
Yang Kun	China	Li Weijia	Initial singer	Week 1 (Qualifier round 1)	Week 14 (Finals)	Fourth place
Faith Yang	Taiwan/Australia	Since Seah	Substitute singer	Week 7 (Qualifier round 3)	Week 8 (Knockout round 3); Week 12 (Breakout round)	Eliminated
Melanie Zhang	China	Wang Qiao	Initial singer	Week 1 (Qualifier round 1)	Week 3 (Challenge round 1); Week 12 (Breakout round)	Eliminated

=== Future appearances ===
Cai Chengyu of Super-Vocal returned in season eight to serve as a temporary music partner for Charlie Zhou in episode five due to his original music partner being unavailable. Second season finalists from the same show entered the competition on episode eight as Surprise Challengers.

== Results ==
First	Safe	Bottom	Eliminated	Return Performance	Professional Challenger
Challenge Success	Challenge Failure	Breakout Success	Breakout Failure	Winner	Runner-up
Absent	National's Recommended Singer	Won Pre-Challenge Face-off	Lost Pre-Challenge Face-off		

	Singer	Broadcast date (2019)													
	Singer	Jan 11	Jan 18	Jan 25	Feb 1	Feb 8	Feb 15	Feb 22	Mar 1	Mar 8	Mar 15	Mar 22	Mar 29	Apr 12	
	Singer	1st round			2nd round			3rd round			4th round		Breakout	Final Round	
	Singer	Qualifying	Knockout	Challenge	Qualifying	Knockout	Challenge	Qualifying	Knockout	Challenge	Qualifying	Challenge	Breakout	1st round	2nd round
1	Liu Huan	1	3	3	5	1	5	5	3	5	2	3	—	—	1
2	Wu Qing-feng	2	2	2	3	4	2	1	5	4	4	5	—	—	2
3	Super–Vocal finalists	—	—	—	—	Win	3	2	6	3	5	6	1	—	3
4	Yang Kun	6	1	1	2	7	6	3	4	1	7	1	—	—	4
=5	Chyi Yu	3	6	5	6	3	4	4	2	2	6	2	—	—	—
=5	Polina Gagarina	—	—	—	1	2	1	6	1	7	3	—	2	—	—
=5	Gong Linna	—	—	—	—	—	—	—	—	—	1	7	3	—	—
=8	Faith Yang	—	—	—	—	—	—	7	7	—	—	—	4	—	—
=8	Chen Chusheng	—	—	—	—	—	—	—	—	—	—	4	5	—	—
=8	Escape Plan	7	7	—	—	—	—	—	—	—	—	—	6	—	—
=8	Kristian Kostov	4	5	6	4	5	7	—	—	—	—	—	7	—	—
=8	ANU	—	Win	4	7	6	—	—	—	—	—	—	8	—	—
=8	Melanie Zhang	5	4	7	—	—	—	—	—	—	—	—	—	—	—
=8	Angela Hui	—	—	—	—	—	—	—	Win	6	—	—	—	—	—
–	Bii	—	—	—	—	—	—	—	Lose	—	—	—	—	—	—
–	Jefferson Qian	—	—	—	—	Lose	—	—	—	—	—	—	—	—	—
–	Liu Yuning	—	Lose	—	—	—	—	—	—	—	—	—	—	—	—

== Competition details ==
=== First round ===
==== Qualifying ====
- Recording Date: January 4, 2019
- Airing date: January 11, 2019

This round's performance order was determined through each contestant's preferred style.

Singer 2019 1st Qualifying Round January 11, 2018 Host: Wu Qing-feng
Order	Singer	Music Partner	Song Title	Original Singer	Lyricist	Composer	Arranger	Ranking
1	Wu Qing-feng	Guo Tao	"燕窩"	Sodagreen	Wu Qing-feng		Liu Huyi; Gong Duo Jie	2
2	Melanie Zhang	Wang Qiao	"可汗山"	Melanie Zhang	Hou Qiang		Nick Pyo	5
3	Escape Plan	Liu Xinran	"一萬次悲傷"	Escape Plan	Mao Zhou; Li Ci	Escape Plan		7
4	Kristian Kostov	Leo Li	"Beautiful Mess"	Kristian Kostov	Borislav Milanov; Sebastian Arman; Joacim Bo Persson; Alex Omar; Alexander V. Blay		Borislav Milanov; Sebastian Arman; Kristian Kostov; David Bronner; Daniel Kostov	4
5	Yang Kun	Li Weijia	"我比從前更寂寞"	Yang Kun	Yang Kun; Liang Mang	Yang Kun	Xue Feng	6
6	Chyi Yu	Jeffery G	"最愛"	Michelle Pan	Zhong Xiaoyang	Jonathan Lee	Baby Chung	3
7	Liu Huan	Li Rui	"夜"	Liu Huan			Gu Su; Liu Huan; Lao Zi	1

==== Knockouts ====
- Recording Date: January 10, 2019
- Airing date: January 18, 2019

Singer 2019 1st Knockout Round January 18, 2018 Host: Wu Qing-feng
Order	Singer	Music Partner	Song Title	Original Singer	Lyricist	Composer	Arranger	Ranking
1	Wu Qing-feng	Guo Tao	"我們"	Eason Chan	Ge Da Wei	Chen Chien Chi	Liu Huyi	2
2	Escape Plan	Liu Xinran	"你的愛情"	Escape Plan	Mao Zhou		Escape Plan	7
3	Melanie Zhang	Wang Qiao	"天下無雙"	Jane Zhang	Fan Xinman; Shi Yong	Chen Tong	Nick Pyo	4
4	Kristian Kostov	Leo Li	"Hello"	Adele	Adele; Greg Kurstin		Nick Pyo	5
5	Chyi Yu	Jeffery G	"是否"	Su Rui; Sharon Au	Lo Ta-yu		Tu Ying; Liu Qi	6
6	Liu Huan	Li Rui	"Une vie d'amour"	Charles Aznavour		Georges Garvarentz	Zhao Zhao	3
7	Yang Kun	Li Weijia	"要死就一定要死在你手裏"	Mo Xizi Shi	Yu Xinyu	Mo Xizi Shi	Qu Shicong	1

==== Overall ranking ====
During the announcement of the results, the placement for some singers (Yang Kun, Escape Plan and Melanie Zhang) were blanked and were later revealed by Hong Tao after all the singers had opened their envelopes.

Singer 2019 1st Round overall ranking
Ranking	Singer	Match 1 Percentages of votes (ranking)	Match 2 Percentages of votes (ranking)	Total percentages of votes
1	Liu Huan	28.37% (1)	18.89% (3)	23.630%
2	Wu Qing-feng	17.84% (2)	19.84% (2)	18.840%
3	Yang Kun	9.01% (6)	22.90% (1)	15.950%
4	Chyi Yu	15.72% (3)	9.32% (6)	12.520%
5	Kristian Kostov	14.34% (4)	10.50% (5)	12.420%
6	Melanie Zhang	10.60% (5)	12.78% (4)	11.690%
7	Escape Plan	4.11% (7)	5.77% (7)	4.940%

==== Challenge ====
===== Pre-Challenge Face-off =====
- Recording Date: January 10, 2019
- Airing date: January 18, 2019

The first National's Recommended Singer is Liu Yuning, and the first Professional Challenger is ANU.

Singer 2019 1st Challenge Round (Pre-Challenge Face-off) January 18, 2018 Host: Hong Tao
Order	Singer	Song Title	Original Singer	Lyricist	Composer	Arranger	Result
1	Liu Yuning	"像我這樣的人"	Mao Buyi			Zhao Zhao	Eliminated
2	ANU	"Fly" (Tibetan)	ANU			Dan Dan; Xu Lin	Advanced

===== Main Show =====
- Recording Date: January 17, 2019
- Airing date: January 25, 2019

During the episode, Yang Kun's manager, Li Weijia, left in the middle of the taping due to participate the Chinese New Year Worldwide Celebration 2019.

Singer 2019 1st Challenge Round (Main Show) January 25, 2018 Host: Wu Qing-feng
Order	Singer	Music Partner	Song Title	Original Singer	Lyricist	Composer	Arranger	Ranking
1	Wu Qing-feng	Guo Tao	"起風了"	Feng Yiyuan	Mi Guo	Yu Takahashi	Liu Huyi; Gong Duo Jie	2
2	Escape Plan	Liu Xinran	"When I Was Your Man"	Bruno Mars	Bruno Mars; Philip Lawrence; Ari Levine; Andrew Wyatt		Escape Plan	Return Performance
3	Melanie Zhang	Wang Qiao	"駿馬謠"	Wang Wei Ma Band	Wang Wei Ma	Wang Wei Ma; Wang Tian Yi	Kim Ji-mun; Wen Dou	7
3	Melanie Zhang	Wang Qiao	"駿馬奔馳保邊疆"	Jiang Da Wei			Kim Ji-mun; Wen Dou	7
4	Yang Kun	Li Weijia	"下個，路口，見"	Li Yuchun			Song Rui; Qu Shicong	1
5	Kristian Kostov	Leo Li	"Crazy"	Gnarls Barkley	Brian Burton; Thomas Callaway; Gian Franco Reverberi; Gian Piero Reverberi		Nick Pyo	6
5	Kristian Kostov	Leo Li	"Don't"	Ed Sheeran	Ed Sheeran; Benjamin Levin		Nick Pyo	6
6	Liu Huan	Li Rui	"帶着地球去流浪"	Liu Huan			Zhao Zhao	3
7	Chyi Yu	Jeffery G	"飛鳥與魚"	Chyi Yu		Chyi Chin	Tu Ying; Li Qi; Huang Xiuzheng	5
8	ANU	Li Haofei	"Apologize"	OneRepublic	Ryan Tedder		Dan Dan; Xu Lin	4
9	Liu Yuning	—	"動物世界"	Joker Xue		Guo Ding	Zhao Zhao	Return Performance

===== Total percentages of votes =====
The results are announced in a traditional format similar to the past seasons- the seven singers are seated on one row and Hong Tao announces a certain placement, one-by-one.

Singer 2019 1st Challenge Round Total percentages of votes
Ranking	Singer	Total percentages of votes
1	Yang Kun	20.50%
2	Wu Qing-feng	18.47%
3	Liu Huan	17.64%
4	ANU	12.18%
5	Chyi Yu	11.88%
6	Kristian Kostov	10.69%
7	Melanie Zhang	8.64%

=== Second round ===
==== Qualifying ====
- Recording Date: January 24, 2019
- Airing date: February 1, 2019

The first substitute singer for the season was Polina Gagarina. Starting from this round, results were revealed in batches, starting with singers with a higher ranking receiving WeChat messages and being informed on placements in private. Also on the same episodes, separate scores for paper and electronic votes were also revealed.

During the announcement of the results, the top four singers received envelopes for the round, but placements for the top three singers had information in it. A fourth empty envelope had no placement (for Kostov), Yang read the fourth-place envelope which had the name inside.

Singer 2019 2nd Qualifying Round February 1, 2019 Host: Wu Qing-feng
Order	Singer	Music Partner	Song Title	Original Singer	Lyricist	Composer	Arranger	Ranking
1	Liu Huan	Li Rui	"Far Away"	Liu Huan			Liu Huan; Chen Di	5
2	Chyi Yu	Jeffery G	"今世"	Chyi Yu	San Mao	Li Tai-hsiang	Tu Ying; Li Qi; Huang Xiuzheng	6
3	Yang Kun	Li Weijia	"逝去的愛"	Ouyang Fei Fei; Jacqueline Teo	Jiang Rongyi	Ito Kaoru	Song Tao	2
4	Kristian Kostov	Leo Li	"記得"	A-Mei; Khalil Fong	Kevin Yi	JJ Lin	Zheng Nan	4
5	Melanie Zhang	Wang Qiao	"母親的草原"	Hou Qiang			Ma Xi Ba Tu	Return Performance
6	ANU	Li Haofei	"路彎彎"	Eric Moo	Heng Cheng Hwa	Eric Moo	Xu Lin; Cao Xingyu	7
7	Wu Qing-feng	Guo Tao	"未了"	Sodagreen	Wu Qing-feng		Liu Huyi; Yang Yingbiao	3
8	Polina Gagarina	David	"Кукушка"	Kino	Viktor Tsoi		Konstantin Meladze	1

==== Knockouts ====
- Recording Date: January 31, 2019
- Airing date: February 8, 2019

Three singers were chosen at random, not knowing that they were safe. They were given messages to enter the room to view the results for the bottom three singers for the Knockout round. A fourth singer (Yang Kun) later received a separate message to view the results for the top four placements. The last three singers (ANU, Chyi Yu and Kristian Kostov) entered the room last, after which Hong Tao announced the results in full.

Singer 2019 2nd Knockout Round February 8, 2019 Host: Wu Qing-feng
Order	Singer	Music Partner	Song Title	Original Singer	Lyricist	Composer	Arranger	Ranking
1	Yang Kun	Li Weijia	"I Love You"	Yutaka Ozaki	Wang Haitao	Yutaka Ozaki	Terence Teo	7
2	Polina Gagarina	David	"Katyusha"	Soviet Song	Mikhail Isakovsky	Matvey Blanter	Nick Pyo	2
3	Chyi Yu	Jeffery G	"女人花"	Anita Mui; Sharon Wong	Preston Lee	Tan Yew-Jin	Tu Ying; Li Qi; Huang Xiuzheng	3
4	Wu Qing-feng	Guo Tao	"窗外的天氣"	Elva Hsiao	Chien Yao	Sky Wu	Liu Huyi	4
5	ANU	Li Haofei	"Ga.Ga" (Tibetian)	ANU			Dan Dan	6
6	Kristian Kostov	Leo Li	"In My Blood"	Shawn Mendes	Shawn Mendes; Geoff Warburton; Teddy Geiger; Scott Harris		Sasha Xuman; Kristian Kostov; Daniel Kostov	5
6	Kristian Kostov	Leo Li	"Stitches"	Shawn Mendes	Danny Parker; Teddy Geiger; Daniel Kyriakides		Sasha Xuman; Kristian Kostov; Daniel Kostov	5
7	Liu Huan	Li Rui	"滄海一聲笑"	Lo Ta-yu; James Wong Jim; Tsui Hark	James Wong Jim		Jason Gu	1
7	Liu Huan	Li Rui	"好漢歌"	Liu Huan	Yi Ming	Zhao Jiping	Jason Gu	1

==== Overall ranking ====
Singer 2019 2nd Round overall ranking
Ranking	Singer	Match 1 Percentages of votes			Match 2 Percentages of votes			Total percentages of votes
Ranking	Singer	Electronic votes (ranking)	Paper votes (ranking)	Total percentages of votes (ranking)	Electronic votes (ranking)	Paper votes (ranking)	Total percentages of votes (ranking)	Total percentages of votes
1	Liu Huan	13.54% (5)	13.90% (4)	13.720% (5)	27.36% (1)	26.57% (1)	26.965% (1)	20.34%
2	Polina Gagarina	17.67% (3)	23.12% (1)	20.395% (1)	17.97% (2)	13.65% (4)	15.810% (2)	18.10%
3	Wu Qing-feng	19.12% (2)	18.16% (2)	18.640% (3)	13.21% (4)	14.99% (2)	14.100% (4)	16.37%
4	Kristian Kostov	13.90% (4)	13.69% (5)	13.795% (4)	11.87% (5)	12.38% (5)	12.125% (5)	12.96%
5	Chyi Yu	13.11% (6)	10.21% (6)	11.660% (6)	14.55% (3)	13.92% (3)	14.235% (3)	12.95%
6	Yang Kun	20.20% (1)	17.37% (3)	18.785% (2)	7.24% (7)	6.83% (7)	7.035% (7)	12.91%
7	ANU	2.46% (7)	3.55% (7)	3.005% (7)	7.78% (6)	11.65% (6)	9.715% (6)	6.36%

==== Challenge ====
===== Pre-Challenge Face-off =====
- Recording Date: January 31, 2019
- Airing date: February 15, 2019

The second National's Recommended Singer is Jefferson Qian, and the second Professional Challenger consisted of Super-Vocal finalist members Frank Ju, Ayanga, Zheng Yunlong, and Cai Chengyu; their music manager Neil Gao was also a Super-Vocal finalist.

Singer 2019 2nd Challenge Round (Pre-Challenge Face-off) February 8, 2019 Host: Hong Tao
Order	Singer	Song Title	Original Singer	Lyricist	Composer	Arranger	Result
1	Jefferson Qian	"Feeling Good"	Cy Grant	Anthony Newley; Leslie Bricusse		Terence Teo	Eliminated
2	Super-Vocal finalists	"鹿 Be Free"	Shang Wenjie	Shang Wenjie; Tang Yue	Shang Wenjie	Baby Chung; Zhang Youzhen	Advanced

===== Main Show =====
- Recording Date: February 1, 2019
- Airing date: February 15, 2019

Singer 2019 2nd Challenge Round (Main Show) February 15, 2019 Host: Wu Qing-feng
Order	Singer	Music Partner	Song Title	Original Singer	Lyricist	Composer	Arranger	Ranking
1	Kristian Kostov	Leo Li	"天真有邪"	Yoga Lin	Wyman Wong	Yoga Lin	Zheng Nan	7
2	Wu Qing-feng	Guo Tao	"Silence"	Faith Yang	Will Lin		Liu Huyi; Yang Yingbiao	2
3	ANU	Li Haofei	"天涯歌女"	Zhou Xuan	Tian Han	He Luting	Dan Dan; Xu Lin	Return Performance
4	Liu Huan	Li Rui	"秋語"	Ma Tiao	Ma Tiao; Tsi-Qing	Ma Tiao	Peng Fei	5
5	Yang Kun	Li Weijia	"娛樂天空"	Eason Chan	Radio Mars		Song Rui	6
6	Chyi Yu	Jeffery G	"不要告別"	Lee Jin Ling	San Mao	Li Tai-hsiang	Tu Ying; Li Qi; Huang Xiuzheng	4
6	Chyi Yu	Jeffery G	"告別"	Li Tai-hsiang; Tong Siao-chi	Katie Lee	Li Tai-hsiang	Tu Ying; Li Qi; Huang Xiuzheng	4
7	Polina Gagarina	David	"A Million Voices"	Polina Gagarina	Gabriel Alares; Joakim Björnberg; Katrina Noorbergen; Leonid Gutkin; Vladimir Matetsky		—	1
8	Super-Vocal finalists	Neil Gao	"Never Enough"	Kelly Clarkson; Loren Allred	Benj Pasek; Justin Paul		Baby Chung	3
9	Jefferson Qian	—	"由我"	Jefferson Qian		Kairos-MG	Kong Sayi	Return Performance

===== Total percentages of votes =====
The results for the Knockout were announced in batches. Five singers, including the Challenger Super-Vocal finalists, were selected at random through WeChat messages. The results for the first four safe singers were announced, while the audio from the backstage was switched off. The last two singers (Yang and Kostov) later entered the room after Gagarina's announcement, and the other placements for this round were revealed.

Singer 2019 2nd Challenge Round Total percentages of votes
Ranking	Singer	Electronic votes (ranking)	Paper votes (ranking)	Total percentages of votes
1	Polina Gagarina	19.25% (2)	19.54% (1)	19.395%
2	Wu Qing-feng	19.60% (1)	18.28% (3)	18.940%
3	Super Vocal finalists	17.28% (3)	19.33% (2)	18.305%
4	Chyi Yu	13.19% (4)	12.91% (4)	13.050%
5	Liu Huan	13.05% (5)	11.93% (5)	12.490%
6	Yang Kun	11.99% (6)	11.24% (6)	11.615%
7	Kristian Kostov	5.64% (7)	6.77% (7)	6.205%

=== Third round ===
==== Qualifying ====
- Recording Date: February 14, 2019
- Airing date: February 22, 2019

The second substitute singer for the season was Faith Yang.

During the announcement of the results, the top four singers received envelopes for the round, while Gagarina was given an empty envelope. Hong Tao later announced that she finished first for the round.

Singer 2019 3rd Qualifying Round February 22, 2019 Host: Wu Qing-feng
Order	Singer	Music Partner	Song Title	Original Singer	Lyricist	Composer	Arranger	Ranking
1	Polina Gagarina	David	"Hurt"	Christina Aguilera	Christina Aguilera; Linda Perry; Mark Ronson		Nick Pyo	6
2	Chyi Yu	Jeffery G	"一條日光大道"	Lee Jin Ling	San Mao	Li Tai-hsiang	Johnny Yim	4
3	Liu Huan	Li Rui	"Sous le ciel de Paris"	Jean Bretonnière	Jean Dréjac	Hubert Giraud	Chen Di	5
3	Liu Huan	Li Rui	"Norwegian Wood"	The Beatles	Lennon–McCartney		Chen Di	5
4	Wu Qing-feng	Guo Tao	"逃亡"	Stephanie Sun	Efen Lin	Lee Shih Shiong	Liu Huyi; Yang Yingbiao	1
5	Kristian Kostov	Leo Li	"I See Fire"	Ed Sheeran			Sasha Xuman; Daniel Kostov; Petio Kostadinov	Return Performance
6	Yang Kun	Li Weijia	"拒絕再玩"	Leslie Cheung	Wawa	Kōji Tamaki	Song Rui; Qu Shicong	3
6	Yang Kun	Li Weijia	"Adventure of a Lifetime"	Coldplay	Guy Berryman; Jonny Buckland; Will Champion; Mikkel S. Eriksen; Tor Erik Hermansen; Chris Martin		Song Rui; Qu Shicong	3
7	Super Vocal Finalists	Neil Gao	"心臟"	Liu Yan; Lin Jing	Kwan San	San Bao	Nick Pyo	2
8	Faith Yang	Since Seah	"女爵"	Faith Yang	Wu Qing-feng		Nick Pyo	7

==== Knockout ====
- Recording Date: February 21, 2019
- Airing date: March 1, 2019

The results for the Knockout were announced via envelopes. The envelope with the identities of the first and last place singers were concealed; the latter had "I'm Won't Tell You" written on it. The identities were later revealed as Polina Gagarina and Faith Yang, respectively. After the envelopes were viewed, Hong Tao revealed the outcome for the round.

Singer 2019 3rd Knockout Round March 1, 2019 Host: Wu Qing-feng
Order	Singer	Music Partner	Song Title	Original Singer	Lyricist	Composer	Arranger	Ranking
1	Super Vocal Finalists	Neil Gao	"Loudly Say I Love You"	Jason Zhang; Gen Sihan	Gan Shi-Jia	Yoshio Tatano	Nick Pyo	6
2	Wu Qing-feng	Guo Tao	"地心"	Wang Feng			Liu Huyi; Yang Yingbiao	5
3	Liu Huan	Li Rui	"去者"	Liu Huan			Jason Gu	3
3	Liu Huan	Li Rui	"情怨"	Liu Huan			Jason Gu	3
4	Chyi Yu	Jeffery G	"歡顏"	Chyi Yu	Lvbai Shen	Li Tai-hsiang	Kubert Leung; Da Ridan	2
5	Polina Gagarina	David	"Спектакль окончен"	Polina Gagarina	Konstantin Meladze		Nick Pyo	1
6	Faith Yang	Since Seah	"浪裏游"	Liu Xijun	Kuo Ding	Kuo Yifei; Kuo Ding	Zheng Nan	7
7	Yang Kun	Li Weijia	"真的很在乎"	Yang Kun	Cui Nu	Yang Kun	Terence Teo	4

==== Overall ranking ====
Singer 2019 3rd Round overall ranking
Ranking	Singer	Match 1 Percentages of votes			Match 2 Percentages of votes			Total percentages of votes
Ranking	Singer	Electronic votes (ranking)	Paper votes (ranking)	Total percentages of votes (ranking)	Electronic votes (ranking)	Paper votes (ranking)	Total percentages of votes (ranking)	Total percentages of votes
1	Wu Qing-feng	19.93% (1)	19.34% (1)	19.635% (1)	15.71% (3)	11.29% (6)	13.500% (5)	16.568%
2	Chyi Yu	15.82% (3)	12.20% (5)	14.010% (4)	18.78% (2)	17.90% (2)	18.340% (2)	16.175%
3	Polina Gagarina	10.97% (6)	10.42% (7)	10.695% (6)	20.90% (1)	20.64% (1)	20.770% (1)	15.732%
4	Super Vocal Finalists	15.97% (2)	18.82% (2)	17.395% (2)	12.70% (5)	11.69% (5)	12.195% (6)	14.795%
5	Yang Kun	15.07% (5)	16.00% (3)	15.535% (3)	12.36% (6)	14.83% (3)	13.595% (4)	14.565%
6	Liu Huan	15.37% (4)	12.35% (4)	13.860% (5)	13.11% (4)	14.70% (4)	13.905% (3)	13.883%
7	Faith Yang	6.87% (7)	10.86% (6)	8.865% (7)	6.42% (7)	8.95% (7)	7.685% (7)	8.275%

==== Challenge ====
===== Pre-Challenge Face-off =====
- Recording Date: February 21, 2019
- Airing date: March 1, 2019

The third and final National's Recommended Singer is Angela Hui, and the third and final Professional Challenger is Bii.

Singer 2019 3rd Challenge Round (Pre-Challenge Face-off) March 1, 2019 Host: Wu Qing-feng
Order	Singer	Song Title	Original Singer	Lyricist	Composer	Arranger	Result
1	Bii	"Nothing at All"	Bii	Chen Youqi	Bii; Chen Youqi	Li Jinwei; Xie Da Xiao	Eliminated
2	Angela Hui	"獻世"	Jordan Chan	Albert Leung	Jay Chou	Johnny Yim	Advanced

===== Main Show =====
- Recording Date: February 27, 2019
- Airing date: March 8, 2019

Singer 2019 3rd Challenge Round (Main Show) March 8, 2019 Host: Wu Qing-feng
Order	Singer	Music Partner	Song Title	Original Singer	Lyricist	Composer	Arranger	Ranking
1	Chyi Yu	Jeffery G	"Memory"	Elaine Paige	Andrew Lloyd Webber; Trevor Nunn		Kubert Leung; Da Ridan	2
2	Super Vocal finalists	Neil Gao	"Melodramma"	Andrea Bocelli	Tang Yue; Frank Ju	Pierpaolo Guerrini; Paolo Luciani	Nick Pyo	3
3	Faith Yang	Since Seah	"推開世界的門"	Faith Yang	Huang Shao-feng		Han Likang; Tian YaHsin; Howe Chen	Return Performance
4	Polina Gagarina	David	"貝加爾湖畔"	Li Jian			Nick Pyo	7
5	Liu Huan	Li Rui	"璐璐"	Liu Huan			Chen Di	5
6	Yang Kun	Li Weijia	"長子"	JIHU			Xue Feng	1
7	Wu Qing-feng	Guo Tao	"那些花兒"	Pu Shu	Pu Shu; Hong Fan	Pu Shu	Liu Huyi; Yang Yingbiao	4
7	Wu Qing-feng	Guo Tao	"望春風" (Fujian)	Sun-sun	Lee Lim-chhiu	Teng Yu-hsien	Liu Huyi; Yang Yingbiao	4
8	Angela Hui	Peng Qing	"夢伴"	Anita Mui	Andrew Lam	Kisaburō Suzuki	Johnny Yim	6
9	Bii	—	"你"	Jam Hsiao		Hanjin Tan	Phebe Chou	Return Performance

===== Total percentages of votes =====
The results for the Challenge was the same from last week, except that the producers randomly selected five singers to reveal the envelopes first. Hong Tao announced the rankings for the aforementioned five singers; the last two singers (Hui and Wu) then entered the room with the same procedure. Polina Gagarina would have been eliminated for finishing last; however, Hui, who finished 6th, was unsuccessful in her challenge and was eliminated instead.

Singer 2019 3rd Challenge Round Total percentages of votes
Ranking	Singer	Electronic votes (ranking)	Paper votes (ranking)	Total percentages of votes
1	Yang Kun	17.74% (2)	18.32% (1)	18.030%
2	Chyi Yu	17.36% (3)	17.00% (2)	17.180%
3	Super-Vocal finalists	18.11% (1)	15.75% (4)	16.930%
4	Wu Qing-feng	16.91% (4)	16.92% (3)	16.915%
5	Liu Huan	13.28% (5)	10.52% (6)	11.900%
6	Angela Hui	8.30% (6)	12.29% (5)	10.295%
7	Polina Gagarina	8.30% (6)	9.20% (7)	8.750%

=== Fourth round ===
==== Qualifying ====
- Recording Date: March 7, 2019
- Airing date: March 15, 2019

The third and final substitute singer for the season was Gong Linna. For this week, the results for this round were void due to Gagarina's injury during this week. On March 12, Zheng Yunlong, one of the band members from the Super-vocal finalists, withdrew due to scheduling conflicts, hence reducing the team members down to three. A footage of Liu mentioning on his involvement of a coronary stent placement was unaired in this episode, but was shown on the following episode after his performance.

Singer 2019 4th Qualifying Round March 15, 2019 Host: Wu Qing-feng
Order	Singer	Music Partner	Song Title	Original Singer	Lyricist	Composer	Arranger	Ranking
1	Chyi Yu	Jeffery G	"隱形的翅膀"	Angela Chang	Wang Yajun		Ye Lin; Lin Meiman; Guo Yanan	6
1	Chyi Yu	Jeffery G	"You Raise Me Up"	Secret Garden	Brendan Graham	Rolf Løvland	Ye Lin; Lin Meiman; Guo Yanan	6
2	Wu Qing-feng	Guo Tao	"蜂鳥"	Wu Qing-feng			Wu Qing-feng; Liu Huyi; Yang Yingbiao	4
3	Angela Hui	Peng Qing	"說好的幸福呢"	Jay Chou	Vincent Fang	Jay Chou	Johnny Yim	Return Performance
3	Angela Hui	Peng Qing	"算什麼男人"	Jay Chou	Jay Chou		Johnny Yim	Return Performance
4	Super-Vocal Finalists	Neil Gao	"她"	William Wong			Nick Pyo	5
5	Liu Huan	Li Rui	"彎彎的月亮"	Liu Huan	Li Haiying		Kubert Leung; Li Haiying	2
6	Polina Gagarina	David	"Forbidden Love"	Polina Gagarina			Nick Pyo	3
7	Yang Kun	Li Weijia	"被馴服的象"	Tanya Chua	Dee Hsu	Tanya Chua	Wen Yiding; Song Tao; Xue Feng	7
8	Gong Linna	Aaron Sun Pu	"小河淌水"	Yunnan Folk Song	Yi Yigong		Robert Zollitsch	1

===== Total percentages of votes =====
While announcing the results, the top four singers received envelopes for the round while Gong was given an empty envelope. Hong Tao later announced that she finished first for the round. The second to fourth place singers entered the room first, and Hong Tao announced the results for two of the three placements. The last four singers entered the room next to reveal the first-place envelope, after which Hong Tao announced the result for the first-place singer. Due to Gagarina's bye in the following week, which caused this week's result to be void, all of the placements are immediately shown instead of just only the four.

Singer 2019 4th Qualifying Round Total percentages of votes
Ranking	Singer	Electronic votes (ranking)	Paper votes (ranking)	Total percentages of votes
1	Gong Linna	18.98% (1)	21.70% (1)	20.340%
2	Liu Huan	16.86% (3)	15.49% (3)	16.175%
3	Polina Gagarina	12.04% (6)	18.43% (2)	15.235%
4	Wu Qing-feng	17.49% (2)	12.56% (4)	15.025%
5	Super-Vocal Finalists	16.15% (4)	11.47% (5)	13.810%
6	Chyi Yu	12.11% (5)	10.10% (7)	11.105%
7	Yang Kun	6.37% (7)	11.24% (6)	8.305%

==== Knockout/Challenge ====
- Recording Date: March 14, 2019
- Airing date: March 22, 2019

During this, Gagarina was absent due to a back injury sustained during rehearsal; the round became a Challenge round while Gagarina was temporarily eliminated and then was substituted by Chen Chusheng, who then became the final challenger. During the performance, Wu and Liu were initially revealed to perform 6th and 1st, respectively, before their order was swapped. Season four contestant Kim Ji-Mun appeared as an assisting singer for Yang's performance.

Singer 2019 4th Challenge Round March 22, 2019 Host: Wu Qing-feng
Order	Singer	Music Partner	Song Title	Original Singer	Lyricist	Composer	Arranger	Ranking
1	Wu Qing-feng	Guo Tao	"花田錯"	Wang Leehom	Isaac Chen	Wang Leehom	Liu Huyi; Gong Duo Jie	5
2	Super-Vocal Finalists	Neil Gao	"大船"	Frank Ju	Sun Hai Yu		Nick Pyo	6
3	Gong Linna	Aaron Sun Pu	"庭院深深"	Gong Linna	Ouyang Xiu	Robert Zollitsch		7
4	Chyi Yu	Jeffery G	"祝我幸福"	Faith Yang	Li Shih	Salsa Chen	Johnny Yim	2
4	Chyi Yu	Jeffery G	"雪落下的聲音"	Rover Lu	Yu Zheng	Rover Lu	Johnny Yim	2
5	Yang Kun	Li Weijia	"浪子回頭"	EggPlantEgg	Ng Ki-pin		—	1
6	Liu Huan	Li Rui	"從前慢"	Liu Huyi; Winnie Goh; Ye Xuanqing	Moo Xin	Liu Huyi	Liu Huyi; Peng Fei	3
7	Chen Chusheng	Eliza Liang	"思念一個荒廢的名字"	Chen Chusheng			Jason Bi	4

===== Total percentages of votes =====
The results for the Challenge were announced in batches; four singers (Liu, Super-Vocal, Yang and Chyi) were selected at random to reveal the safe placements for the aforementioned four; the last three singers then entered the room next during the revealing of the other placements for this round.

Singer 2019 4th Challenge Round Total percentages of votes
Ranking	Singer	Electronic votes (ranking)	Paper votes (ranking)	Total percentages of votes
1	Yang Kun	19.02% (1)	17.60% (3)	18.310%
2	Chyi Yu	17.98% (2)	15.53% (4)	16.755%
3	Liu Huan	14.18% (4)	17.67% (2)	15.925%
4	Chen Chusheng	11.96% (5)	19.27% (1)	15.615%
5	Wu Qing-feng	17.84% (3)	13.19% (5)	15.515%
6	Super-Vocal finalists	8.99% (7)	9.04% (6)	9.015%
7	Gong Linna	10.03% (6)	7.70% (7)	8.865%

=== Breakout ===
- Recording Date: March 22, 2019
- Airing date: March 29, 2019

Four of the seven singers who were initial singers—Chyi Yu, Liu Huan, Wu Qing-feng, and Yang Kun—were exempt for this round. The other three singers would participate along with the ousted singers (including Polina Gagarina, but not the three losing singers from the Pre-Challenge Face-off, namely Liu Yuning, Jefferson Qian and Bii) for a chance to enter the finals. The order for this round was determined through each contestant's status quo and their duration on the stage. Three singers have their performances fixed (Chen Chusheng and Super-Vocal respectively chose 9th and 10th as their choice, while Angela Hui was defaulted to perform 1st as a result of her unsuccessful Challenge); after each performance the singer randomly chose one envelope from a particular group of five singers and the singer that was chosen will perform after.

Similar to the last season's breakout, there were eliminations midway during the performance. Ten singers were grouped into two groups of five, with the first five singers grouped in group one, and the other five in group two. Electronic voting was conducted after each group's performance, and the lowest ranked singer from each group was immediately eliminated with their paper votes rendered void (Breakout failure). Angela Hui and Melanie Zhang were ranked lowest in the electronic voting for their respective groups.

The singers sang one song, and three of the remaining eight singers who had the most paper votes qualified for the finals. The Super-Vocal Finalists, Polina Gagarina, and Gong Linna placed in the top three and qualified for the Finals (Breakout success).

Singer 2019 Breakout March 29, 2019 Host: Wu Qing-feng
Order	Singer	Music Partner	Song Title	Original Singer	Lyricist	Composer	Arranger	Ranking
1	Angela Hui	Peng Qing	"我恨我痴心"	Andy Lau	Lo Wing-Keung	Joan Jett; Desmond Child	Goro Wong	—
1	Angela Hui	Peng Qing	"I Hate Myself for Loving You"	Joan, Jett & The Blackhearts	Joan Jett; Desmond Child		Goro Wong	—
2	Escape Plan	Low Xinran	"Gravity"	John Mayer			Escape Plan; John Mayer	6
2	Escape Plan	Low Xinran	"給自己的歌"	Jonathan Lee			Escape Plan; John Mayer	6
3	Faith Yang	Since Seah	"證據"	Faith Yang	Will Lin	Cheer Chen	Zheng Nan	4
4	Gong Linna	Aaron Sun Pu	"青藏高原"	Li Na	Zhang Qianyi		Robert Zollitsch	3
5	ANU	Li Haofei	"觀心閣"	Tifa Chen	Ming Rui	Q.luv	Xu Lin	8
6	Kristian Kostov	Leo Li	"Get It"	Kristian Kostov	Kristian Kostov; Daniel Kostov; Maria Erke; Sasha Xuman		Sasha Xuman; Daniel Kostov; Borislav Milanov	7
6	Kristian Kostov	Leo Li	"Rift"	Kristian Kostov	Kristian Kostov; Daniel Kostov; Maria Erke; Sasha Xuman		Sasha Xuman; Daniel Kostov; Borislav Milanov	7
7	Melanie Zhang	Wang Qiao	"回家"	Shunza	Shunza; Jeff C	Shunza	Nick Pyo	—
8	Polina Gagarina	David	"Cтороною дождь"	Russian Folk Song	Unknown		Nick Pyo	2
8	Polina Gagarina	David	"Колыбельная"	Polina Gagarina			Nick Pyo	2
9	Chen Chusheng	Eliza Liang	"魚"	Cheer Chen			Jason Bi	5
10	Super-Vocal Finalists	Neil Gao	"總有一天"	Sha Baoliang	San Kwan	San Bao	Nick Pyo	1

==== Total percentages of votes ====
The results are announced in a traditional format similar to the past seasons; during the results, Hong revealed that Chen, Kostov, Gagarina and Super-Vocal were the singers receiving a preliminary higher vote from Escape Plan, ANU, Yang and Gong respectively.

Singer 2019 Breakout Total percentages of votes
Ranking	Singer	Percentage of Paper votes
1	Super-Vocal Finalists	23.23%
2	Polina Gagarina	21.93%
3	Gong Linna	16.81%
4	Faith Yang	10.89%
5	Chen Chusheng	8.51%
6	Escape Plan	7.65%
7	Kristian Kostov	6.28%
8	ANU	4.20%

=== Finals Rush Hour ===
- Recording Date: March 29, 2019
- Airing date: April 5, 2019

The round before the finals was dubbed as "Santine Finals Rush Hour" (金典歌王冲刺夜). Its performance was a guest singer's duet. For this week, there is no voting and thus no results after the performance; for the first time in the show's history, public viewers instead cast their votes to decide the outcome for the round. These performances were recorded and shortly uploaded onto Mango TV; the voting period remained opened for seven days until the airing date on April 5. The top three singers who received the most votes from both the 500-member audience and public viewers were entitled to an advantage—a bonus 10, 20, and 30 votes for 3rd, 2nd, and 1st place singers, respectively—in the first round of the grand finals. The results, however, were not publicly revealed until the start of the finals.

The performance order for this round was first decided by the singer who received the most votes in a prior online fan voting- Super-Vocal finalists won the most votes and was fixed to perform last and decide the next performing singer to perform second-to-last and vice versa (i.e. the 6th performer selects the 5th performing singer, then the 5th singer decides the 4th singer, and so on). The exception was Chen Chusheng, despite being unsuccessful in the breakout round, was temporarily brought back as a guest singer by-virtue of never being eliminated in the competition and being added on impromptu; it was later revealed to have performed 7th in-between Liu and Super-Vocal finalists. Polina Gagarina performance was pre-recorded as she was on Russia due to a scheduling conflict with her concert performance at the time of filming; her music partner David served as a representative.

The episode generated controversy after one of the public audience members, Sakura Zou (邹小樱), made a post on Weibo accusing Super-Vocal Finalists for allegedly using unauthorized music after the show was aired. However, Souya Music replied on the day after the show that licenses to the program group were never issued and that no copyright violations occurred.

Singer 2019 Finals Rush Hour April 5, 2019 Host: Wu Qing-feng
Order	Singer	Music Partner	Guest Singer	Song Title	Original Singer	Lyricist	Composer	Arranger
1	Wu Qing-feng	Guo Tao	Chen Li	"望穿"	Chen Li	Xu Ling	Chen Li	Ari Calangi; Arai Soichiro; Derrick Sepnio; Liu Huyi; Yang Yingbiao
2	Gong Linna	Aaron Sun Pu	Zeng Yiming	"一千個傷心的理由"	Jacky Cheung; Sharon Wong	Jo Heng	Lee Shih Shiong	Robert Zollitsch
3	Yang Kun	Li Weijia	A-Lin	"畫心"	Jane Zhang	Keith Chan Siu-kei	Ikurō Fujiwara	Song Tao
4	Polina Gagarina	David	Geng Sihan	"Shallow"	Bradley Cooper; Lady Gaga	Lady Gaga; Andrew Wyatt; Anthony Rossomando; Mark Ronson		Nick Pyo
5	Chyi Yu	Jeffery G	Mao Buyi	"因為愛情"	Eason Chan; Faye Wong	Xiao Ke		Kubert Leung; Da Ridan
6	Liu Huan	Li Rui	Tia Ray	"City of Stars"	Ryan Gosling; Emma Stone	Benj Pasek; Justin Paul	Justin Hurwitz	Chen Di
7	Chen Chusheng	Eliza Liang	Dylan Wang	"旅途"	Pu Shu			Guo Yifan; Jason Bi
8	Super-Vocal Finalists	Neil Gao	Dimash Kudaibergen	"Forever Queen" Medley				Nick Pyo
8	Super-Vocal Finalists	Neil Gao	Dimash Kudaibergen	"Love of My Life"	Queen	Freddie Mercury		Nick Pyo
8	Super-Vocal Finalists	Neil Gao	Dimash Kudaibergen	"We Will Rock You"	Queen	Brian May		Nick Pyo
8	Super-Vocal Finalists	Neil Gao	Dimash Kudaibergen	"Bohemian Rhapsody"	Queen	Freddie Mercury		Nick Pyo
8	Super-Vocal Finalists	Neil Gao	Dimash Kudaibergen	"We Are the Champions"	Queen	Freddie Mercury		Nick Pyo

=== Finals ===
The finals were divided into two rounds, with the first song in the semi-finals being a duet with a guest singer and the second song in the grand finals being a solo encore performance. Similar to the previous season, votes cast were the sole determinant of the season's winner.

- Airing date: April 12, 2019

==== Round 1 ====
The first round of the finals was a guest singer's duet. The grouping was decided by the singers starting with the most wins prior to the Breakouts (if there is a tie in terms of wins, a prior online vote serves as a tiebreak); each group can consist of either two or three members, meaning that two groups will be head-to-head and one being a three-way. After the groups are decided, one member drew lots to decide the order of performance for this round. The result of the grouping are reflected in the table below.

The singer with the most votes on each group directly advanced to Round 2, leaving the other four singers eligible for a "save" or second chance through a re-vote; the singer who received the most votes cast would be saved and would also advance to the second round.

Legend	Group 1	Group 2	Group 3

Singer 2019 Finals Round 1 April 12, 2019 Host: He Jiong
Order	Singer	Music Partner	Guest Singer	Song Title	Original Singer	Lyricist	Composer	Arranger	Result
1	Gong Linna	Aaron Sun Pu	Shi Yijie; Wang Peiyu	"武魂"	Gong Linna	Xiang Yu; He Zhu	Robert Zollitsch		Eliminated
2	Polina Gagarina	David	Ai Re; Darren Espanto; Daneliya Tuleshova	"We Are the World"	USA for Africa	Michael Jackson; Lionel Richie		Nick Pyo	Eliminated
3	Super-Vocal finalists	Neil Gao	Wang Leehom	"You Raise Me Up"	Secret Garden	Brendan Graham	Rolf Løvland	Nick Pyo	Advanced
4	Yang Kun	Li Weijia	Jason Zhang	"直到世界盡頭"	Jason Zhang	Chen Xiang	Tetsurō Oda	Song Rui; Qu Shicong; Song Tao	Saved
5	Wu Qing-feng	Guo Tao	Jolin Tsai	"怪美的"	Jolin Tsai	Wu Qing-feng	Rhys Fletcher; Stan Dubb; Richard Craker; Jolin Tsai; Starr Chen	Liu Huyi; Yang Yingbiao	Advanced
6	Chyi Yu	Jeffery G	Hu Xia	"知否知否"	Yisa Yu; Hu Xia	Li Qingzhao; Mary Zhang	Liew Xun Dou	Kubert Leung; Da Ridan	Eliminated
7	Liu Huan	Li Rui	Sitar Tan	"我要去哪裏"	Mavis Fan	Barbie Hsu	Mavis Fan	Gu Su	Advanced

Had Chyi Yu, Gong Linna and Polina Gagarina advanced to the next round, they would have performed, "掌声响起", "走西口", and "Those Were the Days" as their encore songs, respectively.

==== Round 2 ====
The second round of the finals featured an encore song, and the singer who received the most votes (separate from the previous round's votes) was crowned the winner. The order for this round was determined by each singer's previous performance order from the first round, except for Yang Kun, who was defaulted to perform first after being the last contestant to advance. During the performance, Liu performed a medley of Empress Xiaoshengxian dedicated in memory of Yao Beina, a singer from The Voice of China (another show Liu was part of, as a coach), who died on January 16, 2015.

Singer 2019 Finals Round 2 April 12, 2019 Host: He Jiong
Order	Singer	Music Partner	Song Title	Original Singer	Lyricist	Composer	Arranger	Result
1	Yang Kun	Li Weijia	"Rivers of Babylon"	Boney M The Melodians	Qu Shicong	Trevor McNaughton; Brent Dowe	Song Tao; Song Rui	4
2	Super-Vocal finalists	Neil Gao	"就在這瞬間"	Liam Low	Zhou Xiaowei	Frank Wildhorn	Nick Pyo	3
3	Wu Qing-feng	Guo Tao	"歌頌者"	Wu Qing-feng			Liu Huyi; Yang Yingbiao	2
4	Liu Huan	Li Rui	Zhen Huan medley				Chen Di	1
4	Liu Huan	Li Rui	"金縷衣"	Yao Beina	Unknown	Liu Huan	Chen Di	1
4	Liu Huan	Li Rui	"菩薩蠻"	Yao Beina	Wen Tingyun	Liu Huan	Chen Di	1
4	Liu Huan	Li Rui	"鳳凰于飛"	Liu Huan			Chen Di	1

==== Winner of Battle ====
Liu Huan was declared the winner of Singer 2019 with 62.22% of the votes cast, leading by a 37.37% margin ahead of runner-up Wu Qing-feng. 62.22% was the highest vote percentage attained in the history of the show.

Singer 2019 Results of Winner of Battle
Ranking	Singer	Total percentages of votes
1	Liu Huan	62.22%
2	Wu Qing-feng	24.85%
3	Super-vocal Finalists	16.95%
4	Yang Kun	11.30%
