= Tantan (song) =

"Tanten"

Song by Gong Linna（龚琳娜）

from the album Thoughts on a Silent Night《静夜思》
- Genre: Humming a song without lyrics
- Length: 3:50
- Label: China Record Corporation | China Record

Tantan is a lyric humming song included in Gong Linna's 2006 album "Thoughts on a Silent Night". The entire song has no lyrics. There are only "um, oh, alas, yo..." . In October 2010, a video of this song at the 2010 Beijing Spring Festival Concert was uploaded online by netizens. The unlyricized babbling singing and the exaggerated expressions of Gong Linna during her performance in the video made it spread rapidly on the Internet and was hailed as a "divine song" by netizens.

== Song Introduction ==
The singer Gong Linna is from Guiyang, Guizhou Province. She has been learning vocal music since childhood. In 1999, Gong Linna was once awarded the title of "Folk Song Champion". In 2000, she won the silver award in the National Youth Singer TV Grand Prix for the ethnic singing style and the "National Audience's Most Favorite Singer Award". Later, Gong Linna married a German composer named Lao Luo, and this piece "Tantan" was composed by Lao Luo.

The first performance of this song was in 2009. Gong Linna sang two songs at a concert of her vocal teacher, the renowned professor of vocal music at the China Conservatory of Music, Zou Wenqin. One was the theme song of "Blood and Romance", and the other was "Tantan".

According to Gong Linna, since the entire song has no lyrics, each performance is different and all are improvised. The title of the song "Tantan" is also based on her own feelings of "up and down" when singing this song. The accompaniment of the song includes traditional Chinese instruments such as the sheng, flute, violin and yangqin. It uses the lyrics of the gong and drum classic from Chinese opera and integrates various timbres from Peking Opera, such as the old Dan, old sheng, black head and flower Dan, with endless variations in an extremely fast rhythm.

This song won the "Listen to World Music" performance Award held in Europe in 2009 .

== Network dissemination ==
In October 2010, a video of this song at the 2010 Beijing Spring Festival Concert was uploaded online by netizens. The lyriceless Yiya singing and the exaggerated and funny expressions of Gong Linna during her performance in the video have been highly praised by netizens. Many netizens tried to imitate them but failed easily, and they were called "unable to learn even after listening ten thousand times". "Tantan" originally had no lyrics. Some netizens made a transliterated video with subtitles based on the homophonic sound.

In the video of the Spring Festival concert, the exaggerated and funny actions and expressions of Gong Linna and the actors playing the sheng and the flute were described by netizens as "very impressive". Hong Kong actor Louis Chapman To imitated Gong Linna's actions in this Spring Festival concert in a rather comical way on the show .

On October 17, singer Faye Wong stated on Sina Weibo that this song had aroused her "desire to cover it". On October 18, it was said again, "I'm so nervous that I lost my eyes but couldn't find them. Let's just pass by them."

At the 2011 Beijing Television Online Spring Festival Gala, Gong Linna sang "Tantan" together with 100 fellow singers, proving that the song had gained recognition beyond netizens.

Even some netizens have created a Hatsune Miku version of "Tantan"

== Basketball association ban ==
On January 26, 2011, the Chinese Basketball Association issued a notice, clearly requiring the DJS of the home teams in each competition area to stop using "Tantan" as background music, and stated that if such violations are found again in the future, strict penalties will be imposed. In its notice, the Chinese Basketball Association defined "Tantan" as "harsh music". Since "Tantan" became popular on the Internet, many CBA teams have played it in the stadium, using its strange rhythm to influence the visiting teams' shooting.

In response, Gong Linna stated that "Tantan" is a "very attractive good song".

My understanding of this statement from the Chinese Basketball Association is as follows: Every popular song has a certain degree of familiarity. If these players are listening to this song for the first time, they might be attracted by the rhythm of the music, which could lead to their attention not being fully focused on the court. This precisely indicates that "Tantan" is a very attractive and good song.

— Gong Linna, Southern Daily
