= Chyi Yu =

Taiwanese singer

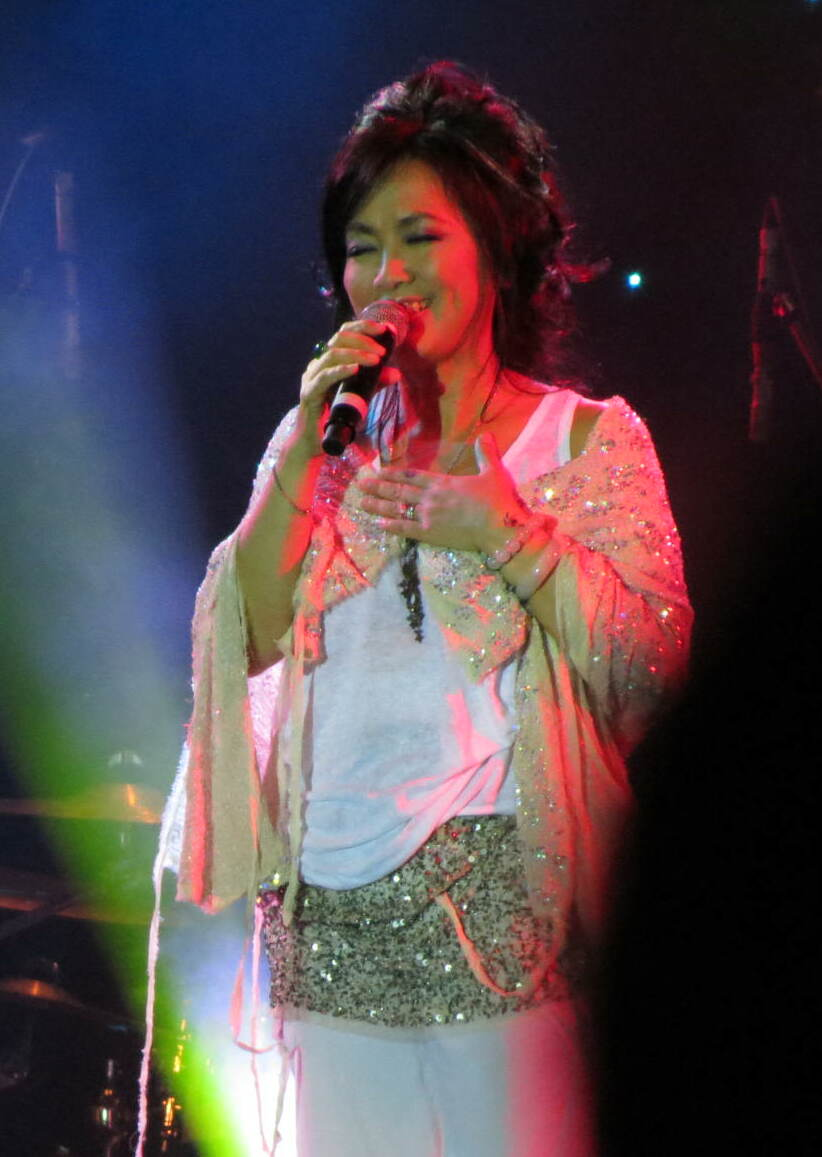
- Chyi in 2012

Background information
- Born: 17 October 1957 (age 68); Taichung, Taiwan
- Genres: Mandopop, Folk, Buddhist music
- Years active: 1978–present
- Labels: Rock Records, Sony Music, EMI

Chinese name
- Traditional Chinese: 齊豫
- Simplified Chinese: 齐豫
Transcriptions
Standard Mandarin
- Hanyu Pinyin: Qí Yù
Southern Min
- Hokkien POJ: Chê Ū / Chôe Ū

Chyi Yu or Qi Yu (Chinese: 齊豫; Pe̍h-ōe-jī: Chê Ū / Chôe Ū; born 17 October 1957) is a Taiwanese singer best known for her 1979 hit "The Olive Tree" (橄欖樹). She won the 9th Golden Melody Award for Best Female Vocalist Mandarin. She is the elder sister of singer-songwriter Chyi Chin. She is a religious Buddhist and a vegetarian.

Chyi is a protege of the late Taiwanese composer and songwriter Li Tai-hsiang. Li wrote the evergreen masterpiece "The Olive Tree", which was released in 1979. Chyi later married Li's younger brother.

Chyi also collaborated with Li Tai-hsiang on a number of her other songs, including "Daylight Avenue" (一條日光大道) "Walking In The Rain" (走在雨中) and "Your Smiling Face" (歡顏). She is also known for tracks such as "Boat Song" (船歌) and covers of folk songs such as "Geordie", "Tears - Donde Voy", and "Whoever Finds This, I Love You". Her last Mandopop album Camel-Flying Bird-Fish (駱駝飛鳥魚) was released in 1997 and she has recently been releasing Buddhist music compilations.

Chyi has worked with international artists such as Dave Matthews (Plaisir D'amour, 1993) and Suzanne Ciani (Turning, 1999); their cooperation album including the title track "Turning" was nominated for Best New Age Album at the 42nd Grammy Awards.

== Discography ==
=== The Olive Tree (橄欖樹, 1979) ===
"The Olive Tree" (Chinese: 橄欖樹), which was based on an English-language poem by Sanmao, was originally written about a small donkey which Sanmao had encountered on a plain in Spain. Li Tai-hsiang had the poem translated to Mandarin by folk singer T.C. Yang, with Sanmao's permission, and wrote the song for Chyi Yu. Yang omitted the donkey, which he felt would not easily connect with Taiwanese music fans. Chyi Yu has stated in an interview that "Every time I sing this song [The Olive Tree], I'm nervous."

Song title in Chinese	Lyrics	Music	Copyright
橄欖樹	Sanmao	Li Tai-hsiang	TWA457901201
青夢湖	蓉子	Li Tai-hsiang	TWA457901202
愛之死 (演奏)	NONE (Instrumental)	Li Tai-hsiang	TWA457901203
答案	羅青	Li Tai-hsiang	TWA457901204
我在夢中哭泣了	Li Tai-hsiang	Li Tai-hsiang	TWA457901205
搖籃曲	Traditional	Traditional	TWA457901206
歡顏	沈呂柏	Li Tai-hsiang	TWA457901207
走在雨中	Li Tai-hsiang	Li Tai-hsiang	TWA457901208
愛的世界	Li Tai-hsiang	Li Tai-hsiang	TWA457901209
預感	Li Tai-hsiang	Li Tai-hsiang	TWA457901210
追逐與重逢 (演奏)	NONE (Instrumental)	Li Tai-hsiang	TWA457901211
歡顏 (演奏)	NONE (Instrumental)	Li Tai-hsiang	TWA457901212

=== Zhufu (祝福, 1982) ===
Song title in Chinese	Lyrics	Music
祝福	王小虎	Li Tai-hsiang
一條日光大道	Sanmao	Li Tai-hsiang
風	Sanmao	Li Tai-hsiang
傳說	余光中	Li Tai-hsiang
雁	白萩	Li Tai-hsiang
牧羊女	鄭愁予	Li Tai-hsiang
春天的浮雕	羅門	Li Tai-hsiang
海棠紋身	余光中	Li Tai-hsiang
都市旋律	羅門	Li Tai-hsiang
星	羅青	Li Tai-hsiang

=== Ni Shi Wo Suoyou De Huiyi (你是我所有的回憶, 1973) ===
Song title in Chinese	Lyrics	Music	Term
你是我所有的回憶 (影子)	Li Tai-hsiang (But the actual lyricist is 侯德健, whose name was not used for political reasons)	Li Tai-hsiang	審154
三月的風	王玉萍	Li Tai-hsiang	審59
浮雲歌	王玉萍	Li Tai-hsiang	審59
他的眸子	王玉萍	Li Tai-hsiang	審59
今年的湖畔會很冷	沈呂百	Li Tai-hsiang	審153
一朶青蓮	蓉子	Li Tai-hsiang	審153
鷺鷥	高上秦	Li Tai-hsiang	審153
菊嘆	向陽	Li Tai-hsiang	審59
彈琴的女孩	醉雲	Li Tai-hsiang	審153
輕輕的走來你的身邊	林綠	Li Tai-hsiang	審153

=== Only You (有一個人, 1984) ===
Song	Song title in Chinese	Lyrics	Year	Music	Instrument
Let It Go	去罷	徐志摩	1983	Li Tai-hsiang	Piano: 城振銘, 吳麗暉
Mountain Travelling	山之旅	林綠	1983	Li Tai-hsiang	Electronic synthesizer: Li Tai-hsiang
Chant of the Sky and the Sea	水天吟	羅門	1982	Li Tai-hsiang	Piano: 城振銘, 吳麗暉
Roam Among the Mountains and Cloud	山雲遊	羅門	1982	Li Tai-hsiang	Electronic synthesizer: Li Tai-hsiang
Infinitesimal	渺小	徐志摩	1984	Li Tai-hsiang	Piano: 城振銘, 吳麗暉
Don't Squeeze Me, It's Hurt	別寧我, 疼	徐志摩	1984	Li Tai-hsiang	Piano: Li Tai-hsiang
Only You	有一個人	李敏勇 (Translated)	1984	Li Tai-hsiang	Electronic synthesizer: Li Tai-hsiang Bass: 侯樂禮
The Actress	戲子	席慕容	1983	Li Tai-hsiang	Piano: Li Tai-hsiang
Songs	雨絲	鄭愁予	1983	Li Tai-hsiang	Piano: 城振銘, 吳麗暉
Raindrops	歌	瘂弦	1984	Li Tai-hsiang	Electronic synthesizer: Li Tai-hsiang Tang drum and Snare drum: 池映傑 Guitar: 倪芳來 Bass: 董榮富

=== Huisheng (回聲, 1985) ===
Collaboration with writer, Sanmao (author) and singer Michelle Pan

Song title in Chinese	Voiceover	Music	Arrangement	Vocal
軌外	Sanmao	李泰銘	Chen Chih-yuan	Michelle Pan (潘越雲) and Chyi Yu
謎	NONE	翁孝良	Chen Chih-yuan	Michelle Pan and Chyi Yu
七點鐘(今生)	NONE	李宗盛	Chen Chih-yuan	Chyi Yu
飛	NONE	李宗盛	Chen Chih-yuan	Michelle Pan
曉夢蝴蝶	NONE	Chen Chih-yuan	Chen Chih-yuan	Michelle Pan
沙漠	Sanmao	Li Tai-hsiang	Li Tai-hsiang	Chyi Yu
今世	NONE	Li Tai-hsiang	Li Tai-hsiang	Chyi Yu
孀	Sanmao	陳揚	陳揚	Chyi Yu
說給自己聽	NONE	李泰銘	Chen Chih-yuan	Michelle Pan and Chyi Yu
遠方	Sanmao	王新蓮	Chen Chih-yuan	Michelle Pan
夢田	NONE	翁孝良	Chen Chih-yuan	Michelle Pan and Chyi Yu

=== Stories (1987) ===
English debut, Producer: Reggie Verghes, ex-producer of Tracy Huang's English album

Number	Song	Origin	Original Year
1	Stories	Viktor Lazlo	1986
2	Memory	Elain Paige	1983
3	Light a Light	Janis Ian	1975
4	Castles in the Air	Don McLean	1970
5	Windmills of Your Mind	Dusty Springfield	1966
6	Love's In Disguise	Amii Steward	1987
7	Unknown Musician	Blast	1978
8	If You Say My Eyes Are Beautiful (Duet With Steven Francis)	Whitney Houston & Jermaine Jackson	1986
9	Diamonds and Rust	Joan Baez	1975
10	Like a Hero	Modern Talking	1987
11	Requiem	Karthago	1983

=== Whoever Finds This I Love You (誰撿到這張紙條 我愛你, 1988) ===
MTV shot in Singapore, Malaysia & Thailand

Song	Song title in Chinese	Original
You Got a Nerve	你竟敢…	Rod Stewart, 1978
Waiting for the Morning	期待黎明	Bobbysocks, 1986
Make No Mistake, He's Mine (Duet With Michelle Pan)	別搞錯！他是我的	Barbra Streisand & Kim Carnes, 1985
He's So Beautiful to Me	他如此美好	Anita Mayer, 1986
Angels, Roses, and Rain	天使, 玫瑰, 雨	Dickey Lee, 1977
Lady On the Other Side of Town	城那一端的女人	Unmentioned
Whoever Finds This, I Love You	誰撿到這張紙條 我愛你	Mac Davis, 1972
Vincent	文生·梵谷	Don McLean, 1972
Yesterday When I Was Young	昨日當我年輕時	Roy Clark, 1969

=== Paradise Bird (1988) ===
Song	Original
Only Love	Nana Mouskouri, 1985
Paradise Bird	Amii Stewart, 1979
Gypsy	Suzanne Vega, 1987
Graveyard Angel	Louise Tucker, 1982
Tonight	Unknown
It Was Love	Frank Duval, 1985
Islands	Mike Oldfield, 1987
Joan of Arc (duet with Reggie Verghese)	Jennifer Warnes, duet with Leonard Cohen, 1987
Broken Heroes	Chris Norman, 1988

=== You Meiyou Zhe Zhong Shuofa (有沒有這種說法, 1988) ===
Song	Song title in Chinese	Lyrics	Music
High Heel In September	九月的高跟鞋	陳克華	虹
If You Really Don't Want	如果真的不要	王新蓮	虹
Fail to Count the Sheep	忘了數羊	羅圣爾	羅圣爾
The Lily In Snow	雪中蓮	陳桂芬	虹
The Man Named Old	那個叫老的人	詹德茂	虹
Any Words Like This	有沒有這種說法	Chyi Yu	虹
Chilly Heart	冷冷的心	虹	林隆旋
Telling from Beginning	細說從頭	李宗盛	李宗盛
A Piece of Lake	一面湖水 (男聲: 羅紘武)	王新蓮	虹
Twelve Nights	十二個夜晚	Chyi Yu	虹
A Room With a View	窗外有藍天	梁弘志	梁弘志
Rouge of the North	怨女	呂思志	張弘毅

=== Where Have All The Flowers Gone (1990) ===
Song	Song title in Chinese	Music and Lyrics by
Find the Cost of Freedom	找到自由的代價	Stephen Stills, 1974
Borderline	邊界	Chris de Burgh, 1982
Senses In Flight	感官飛翔	Words by Chyi Yu & Mark Hansell, Music by Clannad, 1982
Unborn Heart	尚未誕生的心	Dan Hill, 1989
Wind Beneath My Wings	讓我能振翅高飛的風	Larry Henley & Jeff Silbar, 1982
Children of the 80's	八〇年代的孩子	Joan Baez, 1983
Where Have All the Flowers Gone	花兒都到哪兒去了？	Pete Seeger & Joe Hickerson (Arrangement: Tai-ming Lee)
The End of the Innocence	純真不再	Don Henley & Bruce Hornsby, 1989
Longer	天長地久	Dan Fogelberg, 1982
Light In the Darkness	黑暗中的一盞燈	Mark Spiro & Ed Arkin, 1987

=== Love of My Life (藏愛的女人, 1993) ===
5th English album

Song	Song title in Chinese	Lyrics	Music
The Music of the Night	夜的樂章	Charles Hart	Andrew Lloyd Webber
Vino de Amor	愛情釀的酒	Tony Hiller & Nicky Graham	Traditional
A Twist of Fate	命運之轉折	Tony Hiller & Nicky Graham	Based On Serenade By Schubert
Brave New World	美麗新世界	Tony Hiller & Nicky Graham	Based On The Pathetique Sanata By Beethoven
Love of My Life	我一生的愛	Freddie Mercury, Queen	Freddie Mercury, Queen
Glitter and Dust	絢麗與塵埃	NONE	Based On Swan Lake By Tchaikovsky
Plaisir D'amour (dueting with Dave Matthews)	愛的喜悅	NONE	Jean Paul Egide Martimi
Forever Bound	一世情節	NONE	Based On Adagio Cantabill from Symphony No. 5 By Tchaikovsky
The Vision	幻影	Tony Hiller & Nicky Graham	Based On The Swan from The Carnival of the Animals By Saint Saëns
Recuerdos de la Alhambra	NONE	NONE	Based On Recuerdos de la Alhambra By Tarrega
Careless Love	淺愛	NONE	Based On Etude Op 10 No. 3 By Chopin
She'll Never Know	她永遠不會知曉	Tony Hiller & Nicky Graham	Based On Für Elise By Beethoven

=== Chyi's Voice Biography (齊豫中文個人聲音自傳——敢愛, 1994) ===
Song title in Chinese	Lyrics	Music	Original Album	Producer	Published	Arrangement
春天的故事	Li Tai-hsiang	Li Tai-hsiang	金韻獎合輯	Li Tai-hsiang	1979	Li Tai-hsiang
The Olive Tree	Sanmao	Li Tai-hsiang	The Olive Tree	Li Tai-hsiang	1979	Li Tai-hsiang
歡顏	沈呂百	Li Tai-hsiang	The Olive Tree	Li Tai-hsiang	1979	Li Tai-hsiang
走在雨中	Li Tai-hsiang	Li Tai-hsiang	The Olive Tree	Li Tai-hsiang	1979	Li Tai-hsiang
答案	羅青	Li Tai-hsiang	The Olive Tree	Li Tai-hsiang	1979	Li Tai-hsiang
Only You	李敏勇	Li Tai-hsiang	Only You	Li Tai-hsiang	1984	Li Tai-hsiang
雨絲	鄭愁予	Li Tai-hsiang	Only You	Li Tai-hsiang	1984	Li Tai-hsiang
七點鐘（今生)	Sanmao	李宗盛	Huisheng	Chyi Yu &王新蓮	1985	Chen Chih-yuan
九月的高跟鞋	Chyi Yu	虹	You Meiyou Zhe Zhong Shuofa	Chyi Chin	1988	塗惠源
有沒有這種說法	陳克華	虹	You Meiyou Zhe Zhong Shuofa	Chyi Chin	1988	塗惠源
如果真的不要	王新蓮	虹	You Meiyou Zhe Zhong Shuofa	Chyi Chin	1988	塗惠源
船歌	羅大佑	羅大佑	衣錦還鄉 (The Motion Picture Soundtrack)	魯世傑	1989	羅大佑

Song	Song title in Chinese	Lyrics	Music
Danny's Song	丹尼的歌	Kenny Loggins	Kenny Loggins
Sad Lisa	憂傷麗莎	Cat Stevens	Cat Stevens
Stories	故事	J. Walravens	B. Bergman
Borderline	邊界	Chris de Burgh	Chris de Burgh
Unborn Heart	尚未誕生的心	Dan Hill	Dan Hill
Whoever Finds This, I Love You	誰撿到這張紙條, 我愛你	Mac Davis	Mac Davis
Paradise Bird	天堂鳥	NONE	NONE
Diamonds and Rust	鑽石與陳銹	Joan Baez	Joan Baez
Angels, Roses, and Rain	天使, 玫瑰, 雨	NONE	NONE
Vincent	文生·梵谷	Don McLean	Don McLean
Like a Hero	宛如英雄	Dieter Bohlen	Dieter Bohlen
Wind Beneath My Wings	讓我能振翅高飛的風	Larry Henley & Jeff Silbar	Larry Henley & Jeff Silbar

=== Chyi's Tears (1996) ===
Song	OT	Term	Copyright
Tears - Donde Voy	Donde Voy ("Where I Go" in Spanish)	English Lyric: Chyi Yu	TWA45960498A
All Souls Night	All Souls Night	OC: Loreena McKennitt	TWA45960498B
Babie In the Wood	Babies In the Wood	OC: N.Brazil; OP: Little Rox Ms; SP: C.A.S.H.HK	TWA45960498C
Cry	Cry	OC: Elena Rostropovich; SP: C.A.S.H.HK	TWA45960498D
You Can't Say	You Can't Say	OC: John Jarvis/Bill Lamb; OP: Sobvious Ms/Tree Publ Co Inc; SP: C.A.S.H.HK (25%)/Copyright Control (75%)	TWA45960498E
Concrete Sea	Concrete Sea	OC: Terry Jacks; OP: Edward B.Marks Ms Co; SP: Sony Ms Publ	TWA45960498F
Prologue / Winter Song	Prologue, Winter Song	OC: Chris Simpson	TWA45960498G
Knife	Knife	OC: Norma Helms/Mitch Bottler/Rockwell; DP: Jobete Ms Co., Inc; SP: EMI Ms Publ (S.E.Asia) Ltd	TWA45960498H
You Are the Reason	You Are the Reason	OC: Chris de Burgh; OP: Rondor Ms (London) Ltd	TWA45960498I
Send In the Clowns	Send In the Clowns	OC: Sondheim Stephen; OP: Warner/Chappell Ms Int'l Ltd; SP: Warner/Chappell Ms, HK Ltd	TWA45960498J
Big Dream	Big Dream	NONE	TWA45960498K

=== Camel. Flying Bird. Fish (駱駝‧飛鳥‧魚, 1997) ===
Song	Song title in Chinese	Words	Music	Arrangement	Copyright
Fish & Bird	飛鳥與魚	Chyi Yu	Chyi Chin	涂惠元	TWA459757301
To Jueh With Love	覺 (遙寄林覺民)	許常德 & Chyi Yu	郭子	陳愛珍 & 周國儀	TWA459757302
To Have & Have Not	有·沒有	Chyi Yu	Chyi Chin	涂惠元	TWA459757303
Since You Ask	既然你問起	李格弟	Li Tai-hsiang	Li Tai-hsiang & 李奕青	TWA459757304
Woman $ the Child I	女人與小孩I	李格弟	吳俊霖	江建民	TWA459757305
Lover's Silence	話題	黃舒駿	黃舒駿	陳愛珍 & 周國儀	TWA459757306
Tearless Weeping	哭泣的駱駝	許常德	郭子	涂惠元	TWA459757307
Blissfulness	幸福	Chyi Yu	薛忠銘	江建民	TWA459757308
Lazy Love	懶洋洋	林夕	陳偉	陳偉	TWA459757309
Forty Lone Years	四十個無親無故的年頭	Chyi Yu	李泰銘	李泰銘	TWA459757310
Bottle of Sighs	歎息瓶	李格弟	Li Tai-hsiang	Li Tai-hsiang & 李奕青	TWA459757311
Woman & the Child II	女人與小孩II	李格弟	吳俊霖	江建民	TWA459757312

=== Whispering Steppes - Desirous Water (天浴 - 慾水, 1988 Movie soundtrack album) ===
Song	Song title in Chinese	Term
Windflower	風之花	OC: Seals, Jimmy/Crofts, Dan OP: Sotjujo Music/Faizilu Music/Pink Pig Music SP: Warner/Chappell Music Taiwan Ltd.
Whispering Steppes	細雨咽咽的的草原	Words by Chyi Yu Composed & Arranged by Johnny Chen OC: Johnny Chen/Chyi Yu OP: Rock Music Publishing (Twn) Co., Ltd. TWA459848801
Turning	流轉	OC: Suzanne Ciani
The Rose	玫瑰	Duet: Chyi /Sandy 林憶蓮 OC: Amanda McBroon OP: Carlin Music Crop. SP: Warner/Chappell Music, HD Ltd. TWA459753104
I Swear	我發誓	合唱: Chyi /Sandy 林憶蓮/Teresa 杜麗莎/Prudence 劉美君 OT: I Swear OC: Frank Myers/Gary Baker OP: Morganactive Songs, Inc/Rick Hall/ MS (MAC MS Australia Pty); SP: Warner/Chappell Music Taiwan Ltd. EMI music Publ (S, E, Asia) Ltd. Twn Branch TWA459650102

=== C'est La Vie (1999) ===
7th English album

Song	Song title in Chinese	Lyrics & Music
C'est la Vie	這就是人生	Lake, G/Sinfiel, P.
Forever	無限	Timo Tolkki
At Seventeen	十七歲	Janis Ian
Twist In My Sobriety	失常	Tanita Tikaram
Songs and Silhouettes	歌與翦影	Kate St John
Edge of a Dream	夢的邊緣	Tish Hinojosa
Geordie	喬第	Traditional
Time	時光	Dee Carstensen/Glen Burtm
And I Love You So	而我是如此愛你	Don Mc Lean
Wishful Milenio	千禧願	Rene Kupere/Chyi Yu

=== The unheard of Chyi (2003 Live concert album) ===
==== CD 1 ====
Song	Song title in Chinese	Lyrics	Music	Copyright
Intro	序			
Forever		Timo Tolkki	Timo Tolkki	OP: Dark Wings Musikverlag / Maldoror Musikverlag; SP: EMI Music Publishing (S.E.Asia) Ltd., Taiwan; TW-191-03-011-01
Walking In the Rain	走在雨中	Li Tai-hsiang	Li Tai-hsiang	OP: 新格文化事業股份有限公司; TW-191-03-011-02
The Olive Tree	橄欖樹	Sanmao	Li Tai-hsiang	OP: 新格文化事業股份有限公司; TW-191-03-011-03
Any Words Like This?	有沒有這種說法	Chyi Yu	虹	OP: Color Ms Artist Management Co., Ltd.; OP: Chyi Yu: SP: Universal Ms Publ Ltd. Taiwan; TW-191-03-011-04
	不要問我為什麼			
Whoever Finds This, I Love You		Mac Davis	Mac Davis	OP: Screen Gems - EMI Music Inc.; SP: EMI Music Publishing (S.E.Asia) Ltd. Taiwan; TW-191-03-011-05
High Heels In September	九月的高跟鞋	陳克華	虹	OP: 陳克華; OP: Color Ms Artist Management Co., Ltd.; SP: Universal Ms Publ Ltd. Taiwan; TW-191-03-011-06
Stories		J.Walravens / V.Lazlo / G.Waddy	J.Walravens / V.Lazlo / G.Waddy	OP: Buy My Record Publishing; SP: BMG Publishing Taiwan; TW-191-03-011-07
Blessing	祝福	王小虎	Li Tai-hsiang	OP: 王小虎; OP: Li Tai-hsiang; TW-191-03-011-08
	關於愛情的……			
Lee Hsiang-Lang	李香蘭	Matsui Goro (改編詞: 周禮茂)	Tamaki Koji	OP: Fujipacific Music Inc; SP: Fujipacific Music (S.E.Asia) Ltd.; Admin By: 風華音樂經紀股份有限公司
	錯過			
Best Beloved	最愛	鐘曉陽/張艾嘉	李宗盛	OP: Rock Music Publishing (Twn) Co., Ltd.; OP: Promise Productions & Studios Co., Ltd.; Admin By: Musset Publications Pte Ltd.; TW-191-03-011-10
Seven O'clock	七點鐘	Sanmao	李宗盛	OP: Rock Music Publishing (Twn) Co., Ltd; TW-191-03-011-11

==== CD 2 ====
Song	Song title in Chinese	Lyrics	Music	Copyright
Song of the Boat	船歌	羅大佑	羅大佑	OP: MusicFactoryPublishingLtd.; SP: RockMusicPublishing(Twn)Co., Ltd; TW-191-03-011-12
All Soul Night		Cornford Frances	Vores Andrew Mark	OP: Quinlan Road Music Ltd.; SP: BMG Music Publishing Taiwan; TW-191-03-011-13
Moonlight Flower		Michael Cretu & Dylan Cross	Michael Cretu & Dylan Cross	OP: Edition Dataalfa; SP: Sony /ATV Music Publishing Taiwan; TW-191-03-011-14
	星星			
The Answer	答案	羅青	Li Tai-hsiang	OP: 新格文化事業股份有限公司; TW-191-03-011-15
	另一種星星	Example	Example	Example
Vincent		Don McLean	Don McLean	OP: Music Corp. of America, Inc. / Benny Bird Co., Inc; SP: Universal Ms Publ Ltd; TW-191-03-011-16
	一切都從這四個合弦開始			
Where Have All the Flowers Gone?		Pete Seeger	Pete Seeger	OP: Sanga Music; SP: BMG Music Taiwan; TW-191-03-011-17
	給我的祝福			
Story of Spring (Chyi v.s Daughter)	春天的故事	Li Tai-hsiang	Li Tai-hsiang	OP: 新格文化事業股份有限公司; TW-191-03-011-18
Windflower (duet with Wakin Chau)		Jimmy Seals & Dan Crofts	Jimmy Seals & Dan Crofts	OP: Sutjujo Music / Faizilu Publishing; SP: Warner / Chappell Music Taiwan Ltd.; TW-191-03-011-19
Fish and Bird	飛鳥與魚	Chyi Yu	Chyi Chin	OP: Color Ms Artist Management Co., Ltd.; OP: Chyi Yu; SP: Universal Ms Publ Ltd. Taiwan; TW-191-03-011-20
C'est la Vie		G. Lake & P. Sinfield	G. Lake & P. Sinfield	OP: Leadchoice Ltd.; SP: BMG Music Publishing Taiwan; TW-191-03-011-21
You Are My All Memory	你是我所有的回憶	侯建德	Li Tai-hsiang	OP: 常夏音樂經紀有限公司; OP: Li Tai-hsiang; TW-191-03-011-22
Your Smiling Face	歡顏	沈呂白	Li Tai-hsiang	OP: 新格文化事業股份有限公司; TW-191-03-011-23
Memory (NG)				
Memory		Andrew Lloyd Webber, Trevor Nunn & T.S.Eliot	Andrew Lloyd Webber, Trevor Nunn & T.S. Eliot	OP: Really Useful Group Ltd., The Faber & Faber Ltd.; SP: Universal Ms Publ Ltd.; TW-191-03-011-24
	加強記憶			
The Olive Tree (A Cappela Version)	橄欖樹(清唱版)	Sanmao	Li Tai-hsiang	OP: 新格文化事業股份有限公司; TW-191-03-011-25
Outro	跋			

==== BONUS CD ====
Song	Song title in Chinese	Lyrics and Music
Indescribable Night	無以名狀的夜	Kate St. John

=== Beauty Unveiled (唱經給你聽[壹] -- 順心: 因此更美麗, 2004 Buddhism album - Part 1) ===
Song title in Chinese	Music	Arrangement	Lyrics Origin	Term	OP.
懺悔文	梵曲	項仲為	大方廣佛華嚴經入不思議解脫境界普賢行願品	TW-191-03-19001	Copyright Control
大吉祥天女咒	黃慧音	項仲為	金光明經	TW-191-03-19002	OP.黃慧音
般若波羅蜜多心經	黃慧音	項仲為	唐三藏法師玄奘譯	TW-191-03-19003	OP.黃慧音

=== Courage Uncovered (唱經給你聽[贰] -- 安心: 發現了勇氣, 2004 Buddhism album - Part 2) ===
Song title in Chinese	Writer/Vocal	Arrangement	Term	OP.
大慈大悲觀世音	詞·曲 胡海基	黃韻玲 Copyright Control	TW-191-03-21001	胡海基
大悲咒	曲 項仲為（參考海潮音版本)	項仲為	TW-191-03-21002	Great Music Publishing Ltd.
六字大明咒	合音 張淑蓉	項仲為	TW-191-03-21003	none

=== Blissfully Happy (唱經給你聽[叁] -- 快樂行: 所以變快樂, 2004 Buddhism album - Part 3) ===
Song title in Chinese	Music	Arrangement	Term	OP.
般若波羅蜜多心經*	黃慧音	項仲為	TW-191-03-22004	黃慧音
大悲咒*	項仲為（參考海潮音版本)	項仲為	TW-191-03-22005	Great Music Publishing Ltd.
六字大明咒* (合音 張淑蓉)	none	項仲為	TW-191-03-22006	none
懺悔文*	梵曲	項仲為	TW-191-03-22007	none
望江南·歸依三寶贊（古詞 王安石)	陳楊	陳楊	TW-191-03-22001	風華音樂經紀股份有限公司
夢（偈 王安石)	黃韻玲	黃韻玲	TW-191-03-22002	Warner/Chappell Music Taiwan Ltd.
蓮花處處開（偈 龐蘊)	黃韻玲	黃韻玲	TW-191-03-22003	Warner/Chappell Music Taiwan Ltd.
大吉祥天女咒*	黃慧音	項仲為	TW-191-03-22008	黃慧音

(The songs marked with * are the short versions included in the same series of album I & II)

=== Heart (唱經給你聽之四·佛心, 2006 Buddhism album - Part 4) ===
Song title in Chinese	Arrangement	Performer	Copyright	Term
觀音菩薩偈	黃韻玲	Chyi Yu·張淑蓉	O.P.果核有限公司 (Admin. By EMI MPT)	TW-191-06-01001
清淨法身佛	項仲為	張家祥·Chyi Yu·張淑蓉	Public Domain	TW-191-06-01002
梵音大悲咒	項仲為	Chyi Yu·張淑蓉	Public Domain	TW-191-06-01003
觀音菩薩發願偈·大悲咒	項仲為	Chyi Yu·張淑蓉	Public Domain	TW-191-06-01004
普門頌	項仲為	演唱 Chyi Yu/念誦 張淑蓉	Public Domain	TW-191-06-01005

=== The Voice (2010) ===
8th English album - Christianity, Pop & Oldies

Song title in Chinese	Lyrics	Music	Arrangement	Chorus	Term	OP./SP.
Ave Maria De Lourdes/路德聖母頌	Public Domain	Public Domain	項仲為	K.T. Chang, Chyi Yu	TW1910901001	none
Annie's Song/安妮的歌	John Denver	John Denver	項仲為	none	TW1910901002	OP. Cherry Lane Music Publishing Company, Inc / First State Media Group (Ireland) Ltd. SP. Fujipacific Music (S.E.Asia) Ltd. Admin by 風華音樂經紀股份有限公司 / Peermusic Taiwan Ltd.
Amazing Grace/奇異恩寵	Public Domain	Public Domain	黃韻玲	Chyi Yu	TW1910901003	none
Sailing/乘風破浪	Gavin Sutherland	Gavin Sutherland	項仲為	K.T. Chang, Chun-er Chang, Jin-er Chang, Sophie Chang and Chyi Yu	TW1910901004	OP. Island Music Ltd. SP. Universal Music Publishing Ltd.
Silent Night/平安夜	Public Domain	Public Domain	屠穎	none	TW1910901005	none
When a Child Is Born/希望之子誕生時	Seymandi, Maurizio / Specchia, Francesco / Salerno, Alberto	Dammicco Ciro (Zacar) / Benbo, Dario Baldan	屠穎	none	TW1910901006	OP. Belriver Edizioni Musical Srl. SP. EMI Music Publishing (S.E.Asia) Ltd., Taiwan
It Came Upon the Midnight Clear/天使歌聲	Public Domain	Public Domain	屠穎	none	TW1910901007	none
We Shall Overcome/我們將超越自己	Seeger, Pete / Hamilton / Horton / Carawan, Guy Hughes Jr	Seeger, Pete / Hamilton / Horton / Carawan, Guy Hughes Jr	屠穎	Chyi Yu	TW1910901008	OP. Ludlow Music / Essex Music Inc. SP. EMI Music Publishing (S.E.Asia) Ltd., Taiwan
You Light Up My Life/你照亮我的生命	Joe Brooks	Joe Brooks	項仲為	none	TW1910901009	OP. A. & N. Music Corp. / Curb Songs SP. Universal Music Publishing Ltd. / Warner/chappell Music Taiwan Ltd.
Joy to the World/普世歡騰	Public Domain	Public Domain	塗惠源	Chyi Yu	TW1910901010	none
Morning Has Broken/破曉	Lorenz, Gordon / Farjein Eleanor	Lorenz, Gordon / Farjein Eleanor	項仲為	none	TW1910901011	OP. EMI Music Publishing Ltd. (UK) SP. EMI Music Publishing (S.E.Asia) Ltd., Taiwan

=== Over the Cloud (雲端, 2011) ===
Song	Lyrics	Music	Arrangement	OP/SP	Term
I Saw the Light	Hank Williams Sr.	Hank Williams Sr.	項仲為	OP: Sony/Atv Acuff Rose Music SP: Sony Music Publishing (Pte) Ltd. Taiwan Branch	TW-191-11-01001
How Great Thou Art	Stuart K Hine	Stuart K Hine	項仲為	OP: 1953 The Stuart Hine Trust/All rights worldwide adm. by Kingsway Communications Ltd. tym@kingsway.co.uk (except USA admin. by EMI CMG Publishing and pringt rights adm. by Hope Publishing Company. All other rights in North, Central & S. America adm by Manna Music Inc)	TW-191-11-01002
Angel	Sarah Mclachlan	Sarah Mclachlan	屠穎	OP: Tyde Music/Sony/Atv Song Llc SP: Sony Music Publishing (Pte) Ltd. Taiwan Branch	TW-191-11-01003
Santa Claus Is Comin' to Town	Gillespie, Haven	Coots, J Fred	項仲為	OP: EMI Feist Catalog Inc SP: EMI Music Publishing (S.E.Asia) Ltd., Taiwan	TW-191-11-01004
In the Sweet By and By	Traditional	Traditional	項仲為	OP: Public Domain	TW-191-11-01005
The Wayfaring Stranger	Traditional	Traditional	項仲為	OP: Public Domain	TW-191-11-01006
White Christmas	Irving Berlin	Irving Berlin	屠穎	OP: Irving Berlin Music Corp (Warner/Chappell Music Ltd.) SP: Warner/Chappell Music Taiwan Ltd.	TW-191-11-01007
Crying in the Chapel	Artie Glenn	Artie Glenn	屠穎	OP: Mijac Music (Warner-Tamerlane Publishing Corp.) SP: Warner/Chappell Music Taiwan Ltd.	TW-191-11-01008
Jingle Bells	Traditional	Traditional	項仲為	OP: Public Domain	TW-191-11-01009
Will the Circle Be Unknown	Traditional	Traditional	項仲為	OP: Public Domain	TW-191-11-01010

=== The 37 Teachings of Buddha (佛子行————三十七誦, 2011) ===
Terms	Names
Production	SOHO Music
Producers	Chyi Yu & Sophie Chang
Recital and Calligraphy	Sophie Chang
Music Composed and Arranged by	Jon Wei Hsiang
Recorded by	Jimi Wei (at Asia Wind International Music)
Mixed by	Shih Heng Wang (at Asia Wind International Music)
Mastered by	Ben Wang (at Seaside Mastering)
佛子行三十七頌(一)	TW-191-11-02001
佛子行三十七頌(二)	TW-191-11-02002
OP	Great Music Publishing Ltd.
Distribution	Water Music
Marketing	知兩文化科技(台灣)有限公司
Graphic Designer	Jonah Lee Workshop
Release date	2011/12/27

=== Morning Bell Gatha, Evening Bell Gatha, Cundhi Bodhisattva Mantra (叩钟偈/准提神咒, 2014) ===
Terms	Names
Production	SOHO Music
Producers	Chyi Yu & Sophie Chang
Recital and Calligraphy	Sophie Chang
Music Composed and Arranged by	Jon Wei Hsiang
Recorded by	Jimi Wei (at Asia Wind International Music)
Mixed by	Shih Heng Wang (at Asia Wind International Music)
Mastered by	Chung Shu Sun
晨钟偈	TW-191-14-01001
暮钟偈	TW-191-14-01002
准提神咒	TW-191-14-01003
OP	Great Music Publishing Ltd.
Distribution	Rock Records
Graphic Designer	Rou Weng
Release date	2014/12/30

=== The Verses of the Eight Noble Auspicious Ones (八圣吉祥祈請文, 2015) ===
Terms	Names
Production	苏活工作室SOHO Music
Producers	Chyi Yu & 张淑蓉Sophie Chang
八圣吉祥祈请文	TW-191-15-01001
Music Composed	陈玮伦Otis Chen
Arranged by	屠颖 Ying Tu
经文	米滂仁波切
Mixed by	Shih Heng Wang (at Asia Wind International Music)
Mastered by	王秉皇Ben Wang
OP	陈玮伦Otis Chen
Distribution	Rock Records
Graphic Designer	李仲强Jonah Lee Workshop
Release Date	2015/07/01

=== Praise For Ksitigarbha Bodhisattva The Bodhisattva of the Great Vow (地藏贊, 2017) ===
Terms	Names
地藏赞	TW-191-17-01001
演唱	Chyi Yu & 张淑蓉Sophie Chang
Music Composed	陈玮伦Otis Chen
Arranged By	邓易万 Yi WanDeng
Production	苏活工作室SOHO Music
Release date	2017/06/09

== See also ==
- Manchu people in Taiwan
