= ANU (band) =

Tibetan rap duo

ANU Ranglug
- Origin: Nangqên County, Qinghai, China
- Genres: Mandopop; Tibetan pop; Tibetan rap; rap
- Years active: 2016–present
- Members: Bāyǎ (巴雅) Tibetan: Payag; Gōng Bā (宫巴) Tibetan: Gonpa

ANU (Tibetan: ཨ་ནུ་, Wylie: a nu) is a Tibetan rap duo. They were founded in 2016 by Gonpa and Payag. They are from Nangqên County, northwest China's Qinghai province.

== Name ==
"ANU" means "teenagers". Their full name in Tibetan ཨ་ནུ་རིང་ལུགས། (anu ringlug) translates to the doctrine/philosophy of ANU, or ANUism.

== History ==
In July 2016, ANU released their first EP ANU, which included two songs, ANU and Living Hometown. On December 27, they released their single, Joke / It's All A Game.

On May 20, 2017, they released their second single, Fly.

In 2018, their third single GA·GA and fourth single 1376 were released on February 14 and July 31, respectively. The video by ANU features both established and new singers and rappers from all over Tibet, TMJ, Dekyi Tsering, Tashi Phuntsok, Uncle Buddhist and Young13DBaby.

In January 2019, they participated in China's long-running singing competition Singer 2019 as the first professional challenger of the season and won Pre-Challenge-Face-Off, defeated Liu Yuning.

== Discography ==
=== Studio album ===
No.	English title	Released	Notes
1	ANU	2016	

=== Singles ===
No.	Title	Released	Notes
1	ANU	6 July 2016	
2	离乡	6 July 2016	
3	Joke ༼རྩེད་མོ་ཡིན་ཡག༽	27 December 2016	
4	FLY ༼འཕུར༽	20 May 2017	
5	1376	31 July 2018	
6	Just to find you	2018	
7	一闪一闪亮晶晶	2019	
8	路弯弯	2019	
9	观心阁	2019	
10	Apologise	2019	
11	GA·GA	13 February 2019	
12	SARDUBA	19 February 2019	
13	扎西德勒 Tashi Delek	22 October 2019	
14	不要了	25 October 2019	
15	Pham nyong Ngu ma nyong (ཕམ་མྱོང་། ངུ་མ་མྱོང་།)	29 December 2019	
16	ཁྱོད་ལས་མི་འདུག (nothing other than you)	31 March 2020	
17	ཆང་གཞས།	12 December 2020	
18	phyir log yong (ཕྱིར་ལོག་ཡོང་།)	1 July 2021	
19	"Come back to find you"	2021	
20	ཨ་ཁུ་སྟོན་པ	2021	
21	Leave 离开 ཁ་བྲལ་བ།	16 November 2021	
22	སྲུང་།	7 March 2022	
23	ང་ཁྱོད་རང་གི་གམ་ལ་ཡོད། I am in front you	2022	
