= Jefferson Qian =

Qian Zhenghao
- Born: January 5, 2001 (age 25); Shanghai, China
- Other names: Jefferson Qian; Q Bao; Xiao Qian; Haohao
- Occupations: Singer; Composer; Dancer; Songwriter
- Years active: 2014–present
- Musical career
- Genres: C-pop; R&B
- Instruments: Vocals, guitars, piano and drums
- Label: Younger Culture

Chinese name
- Traditional Chinese: 錢正昊
- Simplified Chinese: 钱正昊
Transcriptions
Standard Mandarin
- Hanyu Pinyin: Qián Zhènghào

Qian Zhenghao (Chinese: 钱正昊, born January 5, 2001), also known as Jefferson Qian, is a Chinese singer, dancer, rapper, songwriter, and composer. He is best known for participating in the survival show Idol Producer, where he ranked 11th, as well as his participation in Singer 2019. As of 2019, Qian is a solo artist.

== Early life ==
Qian Zhenghao was raised in Shanghai, China by his parents and attended a private school. At age 13, Qian participated in a children's singing show called China's New Voice Generation Season 2. Qian went to a studio to record an album every year to preserve his voice. At age 14, he participated in a dog-training competition with his dog, Rocky.

== Career ==
=== 2014: Singing debut ===
After participating in China's New Voice Generation Season 2, Qian became a student of singer Shang Wenjie, marking his official entrance into the entertainment industry. In the show, Qian performed "The Monster" with Shang and "Angel" with Shila Amzah.

=== 2015–2017: Becoming a trainee ===
In 2015, Qian became a trainee under the record label Younger Culture. He went to South Korea to further his training, often participating in live performances with his fellow trainees.

=== 2018: Idol Producer and debuting as an artist ===
In January 2018, he participated in reality show Idol Producer as a contestant. His first performance was a cover of "City of Stars", receiving a "B" in ranking evaluation and impressing the judges with his vocal skills. However, he received an "F" in the second ranking evaluation when he failed to memorize the dance moves and lyrics of the theme song, also receiving criticism from vocal mentor Li Ronghao. Later, a limited number of trainees who received "F" grades were allowed to participate in making a music video of the theme song. Qian succeeded in joining the performance. He finished the show in 11th place, two spots shy of joining the final group.

In August 2018, Qian released his first EP, My Art 0.5. He also participated in fellow Idol Producer contestant Zhou Rui's album Unsolvable Problem (无解题), where he was featured on the song "I'll Never".

In December 2018, he was admitted to the Berklee College of Music.

=== 2019–present: Joining Singer 2019 ===
In January 2019, Qian was chosen as the second "National's Recommended Singer", later facing Super-Vocal finalists in the second Pre-Challenge Face-Off in the music show Singer 2019. He was eliminated in the knockoff challenge, but he returned for a final performance.

In April 2019, Qian joined a show called I am a Singer created by IQiyi and won the show along with his teammates.

== Discography ==
=== Album ===
Title	Album details
Yellow Beatles (黃色甲殼蟲)	Released: November 18, 2019; Language: Mandarin; Track listing: 1. "A Fish and a Man" (美鱼人); 2. "Prometheus" (普罗米修斯); 3. "NoNo"; 4. "Melantonin"; 5. "Monologue 2019" (自言自语2019); 6. "Rocket"; 7. "Still Don't Know" (还不知道); 8. "Sorry It's Not on Purpose" (不是故意); 9. "Truman" (楚门); 10. "Inferior Beings" (低级动物)

=== Extended plays ===
Title	Album details	Sales
MY ART 0.5	Released: August 18, 2018; Language: Mandarin; Track listing: 1. "Alive"; 2. "Rise" (触摸未来); 3. "Tonight" (独特存在); 4. "Tonight (English version)"	90,562+

=== Singles ===
Title	Year
"Come" (來)	2019
"Beautiful Love"	2020

=== As featured artist ===
Title	Year
"I'll Never" (Zhou Rui feat. Jefferson Qian)	2018

=== Soundtracks ===
Title	Year	Album
"Whenever I think of you" (每当想起你)	2018	The Adventures of Moto OST
"Mystery Guest" (神秘嘉賓)	2019	Over the Sea I Come to You OST
