= Li Tai-hsiang =

Li Tai-hsiang 李泰祥
- Born: 20 February 1941; Taitung County, Taiwan
- Died: 2 January 2014 (aged 72); Taipei Tzu Chi General Hospital, Xindian, New Taipei, Taiwan
- Genres: Pop; folk
- Occupation(s): Composer, songwriter

Li Tai-hsiang (Chinese: 李泰祥; pinyin: Li Taixiang; Pe̍h-ōe-jī: Lí Thài-siông; 20 February 1941 – 2 January 2014) was a Taiwanese Amis composer and folk songwriter. He was best known for penning a series of popular Mandarin-language pop and folk songs throughout the 1960s and 1970s at the height of the genres' popularity. He also composed many classical works.
