= Robert Zollitsch (composer) =

- Born: 1966 (age 59–60); Munich, West Germany
- Other names: Lao Luo
- Education: Hochschule für Musik "Hanns Eisler"
- Occupations: Composer, musician, producer, ethnomusicologist
- Spouse: Gong Linna (m. 2004)
- Children: 2
- Website: zollitsch.com

Robert Zollitsch (German pronunciation: [ˈʁoːbɛʁt ˈtsɔlɪtʃ]; born 1966) is a composer and producer of new Chinese music. He is known as Lao Luo (simplified Chinese: 老锣; traditional Chinese: 老鑼; pinyin: Lǎo Luó, literally "Old Ro/Gong") in China, and established himself as an expert of traditional Asian music and a very important composer of contemporary Chinese art music.

== Early life and education ==
Zollitsch was born in Munich, Germany in 1966. Zollitsch grew up with the Folk music of his home region, learning early in his childhood a classical Bavarian folk music instrument, the Bavarian zither.

From 1986 to 1990 he studied music theory and graduated from the Hochschule für Musik "Hanns Eisler" in Berlin. In 1993, he was awarded a scholarship to study Chinese traditional music and the Chinese zither Guqin in Shanghai.

== Musical career ==
Zollitsch is known as an expert in Chinese, Mongolian and Tibetan art music. He has been producing and working with Chinese musicians or singers as Gong Linna, Urna, Du Cong, Qiu Ji, Luo Yan, by composing pieces for traditional Chinese instruments that make extensive use of harmonies, fusing together elements of different cultures, which leads to music that seems to be of traditional Chinese art music style with a western influence, sometimes sounding like music of Wolfgang Amadeus Mozart or Antonio Vivaldi or like pop music. The result is a style that is uniquely "Robert Zollitsch".

He has written and produced, under his own label, KuKu Music, over a dozen recordings of contemporary Chinese art music, all of which have caused a sensation in Europe, Taiwan and Southeast Asia. His Chinese audience describes his music as "very Chinese, but with an exceptionally novel touch". Zollitsch studied the "timbre and performing techniques of the chime bells" firsthand, according to the Taipei Times.

In February 2011, during the celebration of the Chinese Lunar New Year, his new experimental work Tan Te (Perturbed) sung by Gong Linna was popular around China, especially among netizens. According to Shanghai Daily, the popularity of Tan Te turned him and Gong into "household names" in China.

== Personal life ==
In April 2002, Robert Zollitsch met his future wife, Chinese singer Gong Linna, in Beijing. The two have composed and produced music in albums like Jing Ye Si (2006) and Ye Xue (a.k.a. Night Snows, 2010). Since 2003 Robert Zollitsch has lived in Beijing.

The Jing Ye Si album contains a piece of the same name that uses as lyrics one of the most famous poems by Tang dynasty poet Li Bai, "Quiet Night Thoughts". They married in Guiyang, Guizhou in 2004. The couple has two sons. In 2024, the couple announced divorce through a performance video on Weibo through Gong Linna the Chinese singer's account that published the video with a description of it and an indication of divorce.
