= Gong Linna =

Chinese fusion singer (born 1975)

- 龚琳娜
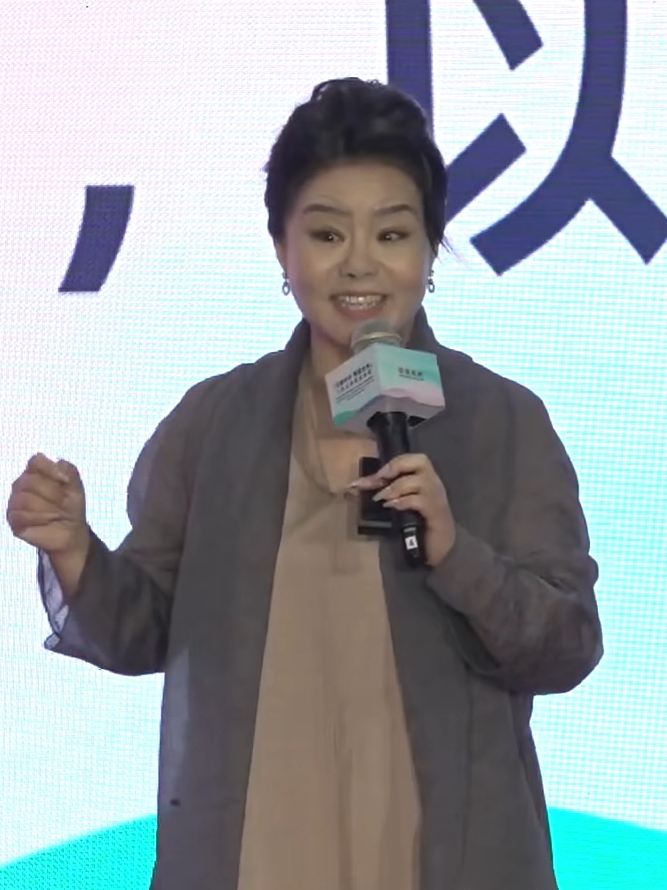
- Gong in 2026
- Born: August 1, 1975 (age 50); Guiyang, Guizhou
- Education: China Conservatory of Music
- Occupation: Singer
- Years active: 1980–present
- Notable work: Tante
- Spouse: Robert Zollitsch (m. 2004; div. 2024)
- Children: 2

Chinese name
- Simplified Chinese: 龚琳娜
- Traditional Chinese: 龔琳娜
Transcriptions
Standard Mandarin
- Hanyu Pinyin: Gōng Línnà

Gong Linna (Chinese: 龚琳娜; born 1 August 1975) is a Chinese fusion singer. Her style is one which combines the traditional "lightness" and "ch'i" of centuries-old melodies with new lyrics. She is also known for her collaboration with her ex-husband, German composer Robert Zollitsch, as well as Portuguese fado musician António Chainho.

== Early life ==
Gong was born in Guiyang, Guizhou, on August 1, 1975. In 1992 she enrolled at the Secondary School Affiliated to China Conservatory of Music, where she studied national vocal music under Zou Wenqin. After high school, she was accepted to the China Conservatory of Music.

== Career ==
Gong rose to prominence after performing her song Tante (Chinese: 忐忑; pinyin: tǎntè; lit. 'Uneasy') in Hunan Television's 2010 New Year concert. The fast-paced wordless fusion song, using various standard voices from Chinese opera along with imitations of traditional Chinese instruments, quickly spread in China as a viral video, gaining the nickname "Divine Comedy". The song was also a viral among southern India Tamil population as Ayyo in Tamil is the name of Lord of Death, Yama or primarily disappointment.

In 2013 she participated in the Jiangsu Television singing masterclass series All-Star Wars (全能星战). Her husband Robert Zollitsch also participated as her sponsor. Her first performance was a rock version of a classic pop ballad based on an ancient poem, "Wishing We Last Forever", but this interpretation was considered insufficiently reverent and received the lowest score. However, her subsequent performances were very well received, including a Yunnan folk song "Rippling Brook" and an opera medley version of "Tante".

== Personal life ==
In April 2002, Gong met German composer Robert Zollitsch in Beijing. They married in Guiyang, Guizhou in 2004. The couple has two sons. They announced their divorce in 2024. Since 2002 Gong and Zollitsch have been making field trips to provinces including Guizhou, Shaanxi and Fujian, seeking to understand and preserve local folk music.
